= List of accolades received by United 93 (film) =

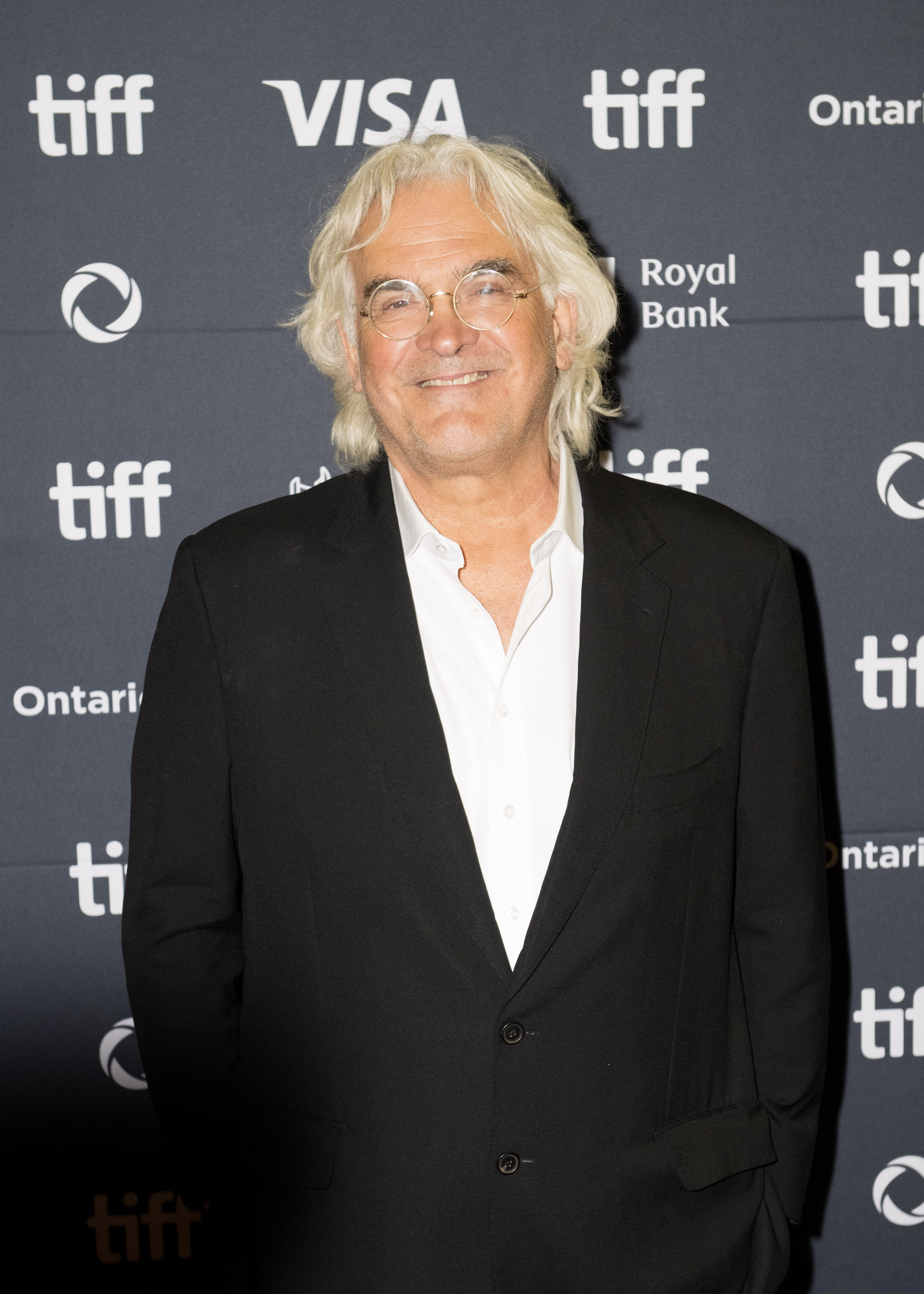
- Paul Greengrass received many accolades for his direction and writing of United 93.
Awards and nominations
Award	Wins	Nominations
AARP Movies for Grownups Awards	1	2
Academy Awards	0	2
American Film Institute Awards	1	1
American Cinema Editors Eddie Awards	0	1
Austin Film Critics Association	2	2
Bodil Awards	0	1
Boston Society of Film Critics	3	3
British Academy Film Awards	2	6
Chicago Film Critics Association	0	3
Critics' Choice Awards	0	2
Dallas–Fort Worth Film Critics Association	2	2
Empire Awards	1	2
Evening Standard British Film Awards	1	1
Golden Reel Awards	0	1
Irish Film & Television Awards	0	1
London Film Critics' Circle	3	3
Los Angeles Film Critics Association	1	1
National Society of Film Critics	1	1
New York Film Critics Online	1	1
Online Film Critics Society	2	4
San Diego Film Critics Society	1	1
St. Louis Film Critics Association	2	4
Toronto Film Critics Association	2	2
Washington D.C. Area Film Critics Association	1	1
Writers Guild of America Awards	0	1

Totals (Note: Certain award groups do not simply award one winner. They acknowledge several different recipients, have runners-up, and have third place. Since this is a specific recognition and is different from losing an award, runner-up mentions are considered wins in this award tally. For simplification and to avoid errors, each award in this list has been presumed to have had a prior nomination.)
- Wins: 27
- Nominations: 49

United 93 is a 2006 British docudrama and action film (Note: Primary genres attributed to the following sources:) written and directed by Paul Greengrass, who co-produced it with Tim Bevan, Eric Fellner, and Lloyd Levin. The film largely chronicles the events aboard the United Airlines Flight 93, one of the four hijacked flights during the September 11 attacks; It is said that Flight 93 was the only plane to not hit its intended target, due to the intervention of its passengers and crew. The film also covers the experiences of government officials and air traffic controllers, many of whom are played by themselves, as they witness the other events of the attacks unfold that day. The film made its world premiere at the Tribeca Film Festival on 25 April 2006, and Universal Pictures released it theatrically on 28 April. The film grossed $76.7 million on a $15 million budget. Rotten Tomatoes, a review aggregator, surveyed 209 reviews and judged 90% to be positive.

United 93 garnered awards and nominations with recognition for its direction, screenplay, cinematography, and film editing. The film garnered two nominations at the 79th Academy Awards for Best Director (Greengrass) and Best Film Editing (Clare Douglas, Christopher Rouse, and Richard Pearson). At the 60th British Academy Film Awards, it received six nominations and won two awards for Best Direction and Outstanding British Film. Several critics groups including the London Film Critics' Circle, National Society of Film Critics, and New York Film Critics Circle awarded it Best Film. The American Film Institute named United 93 one of the Top Ten Films of 2006.

== Accolades ==
United 93 accolades
Award	Date of ceremony	Category	Nominee(s)	Result	Ref.
AARP Movies for Grownups Awards	6 February 2007	Best Director	Paul Greengrass	Nominated	
Academy Awards	25 February 2007	Best Director	Paul Greengrass	Nominated	
Academy Awards	25 February 2007	Best Film Editing	Clare Douglas, Christopher Rouse, and Richard Pearson	Nominated	
American Cinema Editors Awards	18 February 2007	Best Edited Feature Film – Dramatic	Clare Douglas, Christopher Rouse, and Richard Pearson	Nominated	
American Film Institute Awards	12 January 2007	Top 10 Films of the Year	United 93	Won (Note: This award does not have a single winner, but recognizes multiple films.)	
Austin Film Critics Association	3 January 2007	Best Picture	United 93	Won	
Austin Film Critics Association	3 January 2007	Best Original Screenplay	Paul Greengrass	Won	
Boston Society of Film Critics	11 December 2006	Best Film	United 93	2nd place	
Boston Society of Film Critics	11 December 2006	Best Director	Paul Greengrass	2nd place	
Boston Society of Film Critics	11 December 2006	Best Cast	United 93	Won	
British Academy Film Awards	11 February 2007	Best Direction	Paul Greengrass	Won	
British Academy Film Awards	11 February 2007	Outstanding British Film	Tim Bevan, Lloyd Levin, and Paul Greengrass	Nominated	
British Academy Film Awards	11 February 2007	Best Original Screenplay	Paul Greengrass	Nominated	
British Academy Film Awards	11 February 2007	Best Cinematography	Barry Ackroyd	Nominated	
British Academy Film Awards	11 February 2007	Best Editing	Clare Douglas, Christopher Rouse, and Richard Pearson	Won	
British Academy Film Awards	11 February 2007	Best Sound	Chris Munro, Mike Prestwood Smith, Douglas Cooper, Oliver Tarney, and Eddy Joseph	Nominated	
Bodil Awards	25 February 2007	Best American Film	Paul Greengrass	Nominated	
Chicago Film Critics Association	28 December 2006	Best Film	United 93	Nominated	
Chicago Film Critics Association	28 December 2006	Best Director	Paul Greengrass	Nominated	
Chicago Film Critics Association	28 December 2006	Best Original Screenplay	Paul Greengrass	Nominated	
Critics' Choice Awards	14 January 2007	Best Picture	United 93	Nominated	
Critics' Choice Awards	14 January 2007	Best Director	Paul Greengrass	Nominated	
Dallas–Fort Worth Film Critics Association	19 December 2006	Best Film	United 93	Won	
Dallas–Fort Worth Film Critics Association	19 December 2006	Best Director	Paul Greengrass	2nd place	
Empire Awards	27 March 2007	Best Film	United 93	Nominated	
Empire Awards	27 March 2007	Best British Film	United 93	Won	
Evening Standard British Film Awards	4 February 2007	Best Film	United 93	Won	
Golden Reel Awards	24 January 2007	Best Sound Editing for Sound Effects and Foley in a Foreign Film	Oliver Tarney, Eddy Joseph, Harry Barnes, Richard Fordham, Paul Conway , Jack Whittaker, Martin Cantwell, Tony Currie, Simon Chase, Stuart Morton, and Alex Joseph	Nominated	
Irish Film & Television Awards	10 February 2007	Best International Film	United 93	Nominated	
London Film Critics' Circle	24 February 2007	Film of the Year	United 93	Won	
London Film Critics' Circle	24 February 2007	Director of the Year	Paul Greengrass	Won	
London Film Critics' Circle	24 February 2007	British Producer of the Year	Tim Bevan, Lloyd Levin, and Paul Greengrass	Won	
Los Angeles Film Critics Association	10 December 2006	Best Director	Paul Greengrass	Won	
National Society of Film Critics	6 January 2007	Best Director	Paul Greengrass	Won	
New York Film Critics Circle	11 December 2006	Best Film	United 93	Won	
Online Film Critics Society	7 January 2007	Best Picture	United 93	Won	
Online Film Critics Society	7 January 2007	Best Director	Paul Greengrass	Nominated	
Online Film Critics Society	7 January 2007	Best Original Screenplay	Paul Greengrass	Nominated	
Online Film Critics Society	7 January 2007	Best Editing	Clare Douglas, Christopher Rouse, and Richard Pearson	Won	
St. Louis Film Critics Association	7 January 2007	Best Film	United 93	Nominated	
St. Louis Film Critics Association	7 January 2007	Best Director	Paul Greengrass	Nominated	
St. Louis Film Critics Association	7 January 2007	Top 10 Films	United 93	Won	
St. Louis Film Critics Association	7 January 2007	Most Original, Innovative or Creative Film	United 93	Won	
San Diego Film Critics Society	19 December 2006	Best Editing	Clare Douglas, Christopher Rouse, and Richard Pearson	Won	
Toronto Film Critics Association	19 December 2006	Best Film	United 93	Runner-up (Note: Tied with The Departed)	
Toronto Film Critics Association	19 December 2006	Best Director	Paul Greengrass	Runner-up (Note: Tied with Martin Scorsese for The Departed)	
Washington D.C. Area Film Critics Association	11 December 2006	Best Film	United 93	Won	
Writers Guild of America Awards	11 February 2007	Best Original Screenplay	Paul Greengrass	Nominated	
