= List of accolades received by The Departed =

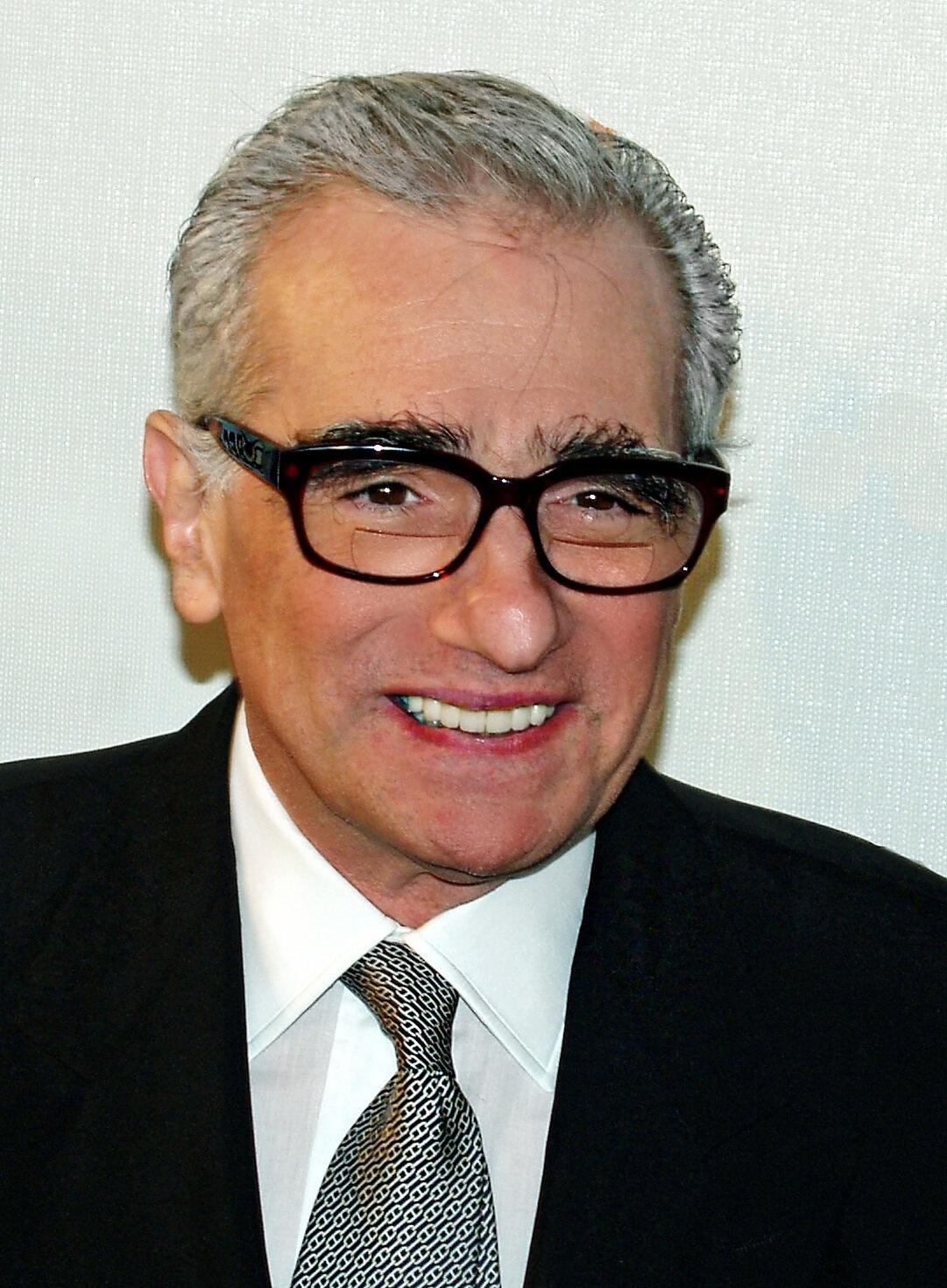
- Martin Scorsese received several accolades for his direction, including the Academy Award for Best Director.
Awards and nominations
Award	Wins	Nominations
AARP Movies for Grownups Awards	0	2
Academy Awards	4	5
African-American Film Critics Association	1	1
American Cinema Editors Eddie Awards	1	1
Argentine Film Critics Association	0	1
Art Directors Guild Awards	0	1
Austin Film Critics Association	4	4
Boston Society of Film Critics	6	6
British Academy Film Awards	0	6
Camerimage	0	1
Chicago Film Critics Association	3	6
Critics Choice Awards	2	7
Dallas–Fort Worth Film Critics Association	4	4
Directors Guild of America Awards	1	1
Edgar Awards	1	1
Empire Awards	1	6
Florida Film Critics Circle	4	4
Golden Globe Awards	1	6
Gotham Awards	0	1
Grammy Awards	0	1
Guys Choice Awards	1	1
International Cinephile Society	4	4
Irish Film & Television Awards	1	2
Kansas City Film Critics Circle	1	1
London Film Critics' Circle	0	3
MTV Movie Awards	1	1
National Board of Review	3	3
National Society of Film Critics	3	3
New York Film Critics Circle	3	3
Online Film Critics Society	1	7
Producers Guild of America Awards	0	1
Satellite Awards	3	6
Saturn Awards	0	1
Screen Actors Guild Awards	0	2
Southeastern Film Critics Association	3	3
St. Louis Film Critics Association	2	6
Toronto Film Critics Association	0	4
Washington D.C. Area Film Critics Association	1	1
Writers Guild of America Awards	1	1

Totals (Note: Certain award groups do not simply award one winner. They acknowledge several different recipients, have runners-up, and have third place. Since this is a specific recognition and is different from losing an award, runner-up mentions are considered wins in this award tally. For simplification and to avoid errors, each award in this list has been presumed to have had a prior nomination.)
- Wins: 61
- Nominations: 118

The Departed is a 2006 crime thriller film directed by Martin Scorsese and written by William Monahan. It is a remake of the 2002 Hong Kong film Infernal Affairs and takes place in South Boston. The film follows an undercover Massachusetts State Police officer who infiltrates the Irish mob, while the mob has another police officer secretly spying for them within the police. The film stars Leonardo DiCaprio, Matt Damon, Jack Nicholson, and Mark Wahlberg, with Martin Sheen, Ray Winstone, Vera Farmiga, Alec Baldwin, Anthony Anderson and James Badge Dale featuring in supporting roles.

The Departed received accolades in several categories, with recognition for its direction, screenplay, performances (particularly those of DiCaprio, Nicholson and Wahlberg), and Thelma Schoonmaker's editing. At the 79th Academy Awards, The Departed received five nominations and won a leading four: Best Picture, Best Director (Scorsese), Best Adapted Screenplay (Monahan) and Best Film Editing (Schoonmaker). The film received six nominations at the 60th British Academy Film Awards, including Best Film, but didn't win any. The Departed received six nominations at the 64th Golden Globe Awards, including Best Motion Picture – Drama, with Scorsese winning Best Director. At the 12th Critics' Choice Awards, the film won two awards from seven nominations: Best Picture and Best Director for Scorsese.

== Accolades ==
Accolades received by The Departed
Award	Date of ceremony	Category	Recipient(s)	Result	Ref(s).
AARP Movies for Grownups Awards	February 6, 2007	Best Director	Martin Scorsese	Nominated	
AARP Movies for Grownups Awards	February 6, 2007	Best Actor	Jack Nicholson	Nominated	
Academy Awards	February 25, 2007	Best Picture	Graham King	Won	
Academy Awards	February 25, 2007	Best Director	Martin Scorsese	Won	
Academy Awards	February 25, 2007	Best Supporting Actor	Mark Wahlberg	Nominated	
Academy Awards	February 25, 2007	Best Adapted Screenplay	William Monahan	Won	
Academy Awards	February 25, 2007	Best Film Editing	Thelma Schoonmaker	Won	
African-American Film Critics Association	December 22, 2006	Best Film	The Departed	3rd place	
American Cinema Editors Eddie Awards	February 18, 2007	Best Edited Feature Film – Dramatic	Thelma Schoonmaker	Won (Note: Tied with Douglas Crise and Stephen Mirrione for Babel)	
Argentine Film Critics Association	July 2, 2007	Silver Condor Award for Best Foreign Film	Martin Scorsese	Nominated	
Art Directors Guild Awards	February 17, 2007	Excellence in Production Design for a Contemporary Film	Kristi Zea	Nominated	
Austin Film Critics Association	January 2, 2007	Best Film	The Departed	3rd place	
Austin Film Critics Association	January 2, 2007	Best Actor	Leonardo DiCaprio	Won	
Austin Film Critics Association	January 2, 2007	Best Supporting Actor	Jack Nicholson	Won	
Austin Film Critics Association	December 15, 2009	Top 10 Films of the Decade	The Departed	10th place (Note: Tied with Memento)	
Boston Society of Film Critics	December 22, 2006	Best Film	The Departed	Won	
Boston Society of Film Critics	December 22, 2006	Best Director	Martin Scorsese	Won	
Boston Society of Film Critics	December 22, 2006	Best Screenplay	William Monahan	Won	
Boston Society of Film Critics	December 22, 2006	Best Supporting Actor	Alec Baldwin	2nd place (Note: Tied with Michael Sheen for The Queen)	
Boston Society of Film Critics	December 22, 2006	Best Supporting Actor	Mark Wahlberg	Won	
Boston Society of Film Critics	December 22, 2006	Best Ensemble Cast	The Departed	2nd place	
British Academy Film Awards	February 11, 2007	Best Film	Brad Pitt, Brad Grey and Graham King	Nominated	
British Academy Film Awards	February 11, 2007	Best Direction	Martin Scorsese	Nominated	
British Academy Film Awards	February 11, 2007	Best Actor in a Leading Role	Leonardo DiCaprio	Nominated	
British Academy Film Awards	February 11, 2007	Best Actor in a Supporting Role	Jack Nicholson	Nominated	
British Academy Film Awards	February 11, 2007	Best Adapted Screenplay	William Monahan	Nominated	
British Academy Film Awards	February 11, 2007	Best Editing	Thelma Schoonmaker	Nominated	
Camerimage	December 3, 2006	Golden Frog	Michael Ballhaus	Nominated	
Chicago Film Critics Association	December 28, 2006	Best Picture	The Departed	Won	
Chicago Film Critics Association	December 28, 2006	Best Director	Martin Scorsese	Won	
Chicago Film Critics Association	December 28, 2006	Best Adapted Screenplay	William Monahan	Won	
Chicago Film Critics Association	December 28, 2006	Best Actor	Leonardo DiCaprio	Nominated	
Chicago Film Critics Association	December 28, 2006	Best Supporting Actor	Jack Nicholson	Nominated	
Chicago Film Critics Association	December 28, 2006	Best Cinematography	Michael Ballhaus	Nominated	
Critics Choice Awards	January 14, 2007	Best Picture	The Departed	Won	
Critics Choice Awards	January 14, 2007	Best Director	Martin Scorsese	Won	
Critics Choice Awards	January 14, 2007	Best Actor	Leonardo DiCaprio	Nominated	
Critics Choice Awards	January 14, 2007	Best Supporting Actor	Jack Nicholson	Nominated	
Critics Choice Awards	January 14, 2007	Best Acting Ensemble	The Departed	Nominated	
Critics Choice Awards	January 14, 2007	Best Writer	William Monahan	Nominated	
Critics Choice Awards	January 14, 2007	Best Composer	Howard Shore	Nominated	
Dallas–Fort Worth Film Critics Association	December 19, 2006	Top 10 Films	The Departed	2nd place	
Dallas–Fort Worth Film Critics Association	December 19, 2006	Best Director	Martin Scorsese	Won	
Dallas–Fort Worth Film Critics Association	December 19, 2006	Best Actor	Leonardo DiCaprio	2nd place	
Dallas–Fort Worth Film Critics Association	December 19, 2006	Best Supporting Actor	Jack Nicholson	2nd place	
Directors Guild of America Awards	February 3, 2007	Outstanding Directorial Achievement in Feature Film	Martin Scorsese	Won	
Edgar Awards	April 26, 2007	Best Motion Picture Screenplay	William Monahan	Won	
Empire Awards	March 27, 2007	Best Film	The Departed	Nominated	
Empire Awards	March 27, 2007	Best Director	Martin Scorsese	Nominated	
Empire Awards	March 27, 2007	Best Actor	Leonardo DiCaprio	Nominated	
Empire Awards	March 27, 2007	Best Female Newcomer	Vera Farmiga	Nominated	
Empire Awards	March 27, 2007	Best Thriller	The Departed	Won	
Empire Awards	March 27, 2007	Scene of the Year	Frank and Mr. French interrogate Costigan	Nominated	
Florida Film Critics Circle	December 22, 2006	Best Film	The Departed	Won	
Florida Film Critics Circle	December 22, 2006	Best Director	Martin Scorsese	Won	
Florida Film Critics Circle	December 22, 2006	Best Supporting Actor	Jack Nicholson	Won	
Florida Film Critics Circle	December 22, 2006	Best Screenplay	William Monahan	Won	
Golden Globe Awards	January 15, 2007	Best Motion Picture – Drama	The Departed	Nominated	
Golden Globe Awards	January 15, 2007	Best Director	Martin Scorsese	Won	
Golden Globe Awards	January 15, 2007	Best Actor in a Motion Picture – Drama	Leonardo DiCaprio	Nominated	
Golden Globe Awards	January 15, 2007	Best Supporting Actor – Motion Picture	Jack Nicholson	Nominated	
Golden Globe Awards	January 15, 2007	Best Supporting Actor – Motion Picture	Mark Wahlberg	Nominated	
Golden Globe Awards	January 15, 2007	Best Screenplay	William Monahan	Nominated	
Gotham Awards	November 29, 2006	Best Feature	The Departed	Nominated	
Grammy Awards	February 10, 2008	Best Score Soundtrack for Visual Media	Howard Shore	Nominated	
Guys Choice Awards	June 9, 2007	Best Gangstertainment	The Departed	Won	
International Cinephile Society	2007	Best Picture	The Departed	2nd place	
International Cinephile Society	2007	Best Actor	Leonardo DiCaprio	Won	
International Cinephile Society	2007	Best Adapted Screenplay	William Monahan	Won	
International Cinephile Society	2007	Best Ensemble	The Departed	Won	
Irish Film & Television Awards	February 10, 2007	Best International Film	The Departed	Nominated	
Irish Film & Television Awards	February 10, 2007	Best International Actor	Leonardo DiCaprio	Won	
Kansas City Film Critics Circle	January 2, 2007	Best Adapted Screenplay	William Monahan	Won	
London Film Critics' Circle	February 8, 2007	Film of the Year	The Departed	Nominated	
London Film Critics' Circle	February 8, 2007	Director of the Year	Martin Scorsese	Nominated	
London Film Critics' Circle	February 8, 2007	British Producer of the Year	Graham King	Nominated	
MTV Movie Awards	June 3, 2007	Best Villain	Jack Nicholson	Won	
National Board of Review	January 9, 2007	Top 10 Films	The Departed	Won (Note: This award does not have a single winner, but recognizes multiple films.)	
National Board of Review	January 9, 2007	Best Director	Martin Scorsese	Won	
National Board of Review	January 9, 2007	Best Acting by an Ensemble	The Departed	Won	
National Society of Film Critics	January 6, 2007	Best Director	Martin Scorsese	2nd place (Note: Tied with Guillermo del Toro for Pan's Labyrinth)	
National Society of Film Critics	January 6, 2007	Best Supporting Actor	Mark Wahlberg	Won	
National Society of Film Critics	January 6, 2007	Best Screenplay	William Monahan	2nd place	
New York Film Critics Circle	January 7, 2007	Best Film	The Departed	3rd place	
New York Film Critics Circle	January 7, 2007	Best Director	Martin Scorsese	Won	
New York Film Critics Circle	January 7, 2007	Best Screenplay	William Monahan	2nd place	
Online Film Critics Society	January 8, 2007	Best Picture	The Departed	Nominated	
Online Film Critics Society	January 8, 2007	Best Director	Martin Scorsese	Won	
Online Film Critics Society	January 8, 2007	Best Actor	Leonardo DiCaprio	Nominated	
Online Film Critics Society	January 8, 2007	Best Supporting Actor	Jack Nicholson	Nominated	
Online Film Critics Society	January 8, 2007	Best Supporting Actor	Mark Wahlberg	Nominated	
Online Film Critics Society	January 8, 2007	Best Adapted Screenplay	William Monahan	Nominated	
Online Film Critics Society	January 8, 2007	Best Editing	Thelma Schoonmaker	Nominated	
Producers Guild of America Awards	January 20, 2007	Outstanding Producer of Theatrical Motion Pictures	Graham King	Nominated	
Satellite Awards	December 18, 2006	Best Motion Picture, Drama	The Departed	Nominated	
Satellite Awards	December 18, 2006	Best Director	Martin Scorsese	Nominated	
Satellite Awards	December 18, 2006	Best Actor in a Supporting Role	Leonardo DiCaprio	Won	
Satellite Awards	December 18, 2006	Best Actor in a Supporting Role	Jack Nicholson	Nominated	
Satellite Awards	December 18, 2006	Best Screenplay: Adapted	William Monahan	Won	
Satellite Awards	December 18, 2006	Best Ensemble	The Departed	Won	
Saturn Awards	May 10, 2007	Best Action/Adventure/Thriller Film	The Departed	Nominated	
Screen Actors Guild Awards	January 28, 2007	Outstanding Cast in a Motion Picture	Anthony Anderson, Alec Baldwin, Matt Damon, Leonardo DiCaprio, Vera Farmiga, Jack Nicholson, Martin Sheen, Mark Wahlberg, and Ray Winstone	Nominated	
Screen Actors Guild Awards	January 28, 2007	Outstanding Male Actor in a Supporting Role	Leonardo DiCaprio	Nominated	
Southeastern Film Critics Association	December 17, 2006	Best Film	The Departed	Won	
Southeastern Film Critics Association	December 17, 2006	Best Director	Martin Scorsese	Won	
Southeastern Film Critics Association	December 17, 2006	Best Adapted Screenplay	William Monahan	Won	
St. Louis Film Critics Association	January 7, 2007	Best Film	The Departed	Won	
St. Louis Film Critics Association	January 7, 2007	Best Director	Martin Scorsese	Won	
St. Louis Film Critics Association	January 7, 2007	Best Actor	Leonardo DiCaprio	Nominated	
St. Louis Film Critics Association	January 7, 2007	Best Supporting Actor	Jack Nicholson	Nominated	
St. Louis Film Critics Association	January 7, 2007	Best Screenplay	William Monahan	Nominated	
St. Louis Film Critics Association	January 7, 2007	Best Cinematography	Michael Ballhaus	Nominated	
Toronto Film Critics Association	December 19, 2006	Best Film	The Departed	Nominated	
Toronto Film Critics Association	December 19, 2006	Best Director	Martin Scorsese	Nominated	
Toronto Film Critics Association	December 19, 2006	Best Supporting Actor	Mark Wahlberg	Nominated	
Toronto Film Critics Association	December 19, 2006	Best Screenplay	William Monahan	Nominated	
Washington D.C. Area Film Critics Association	December 11, 2006	Best Director	Martin Scorsese	Won	
Writers Guild of America Awards	February 11, 2007	Best Adapted Screenplay	William Monahan	Won	
