= San Diego Film Critics Society Award for Best Editing =

Annual US film award

The San Diego Film Critics Society Award for Best (Film) Editing is an award given by the San Diego Film Critics Society to honor the finest directing achievements in filmmaking.

== Winners ==
=== 2000s ===
Year	Winner	Editor(s)
2002	Thirteen Conversations About One Thing	Stephen Mirrione
2003	Kill Bill: Volume 1	Sally Menke
2004	Eternal Sunshine of the Spotless Mind	Valdís Óskarsdóttir
2005	A History of Violence	Ronald Sanders
2006	United 93	Clare Douglas, Richard Pearson, and Christopher Rouse
2007	Atonement	Paul Tothill
2008	Slumdog Millionaire	Chris Dickens
2009	(500) Days of Summer	Alan Edward Bell

=== 2010s ===
Year	Winner	Editor(s)
2010	Scott Pilgrim vs. the World	Paul Machliss and Jonathan Amos
2011	Beginners	Olivier Bugge Coutté
2012	Argo	William Goldenberg
2013	Captain Phillips	Christopher Rouse
2014	Edge of Tomorrow	James Herbert and Laura Jennings
2015	Mad Max: Fury Road	Margaret Sixel and Jason Ballantine
2016	Sully	Blu Murray
2017	Baby Driver	Paul Machliss and Jonathan Amos
2018	Game Night	Jamie Gross and David Egan
2019	Ford v Ferrari	Andrew Buckland, Michael McCusker & Dirk Westervelt

=== 2020s ===
Year	Winner	Editor(s)
2020	The Invisible Man	Andy Canny
2021	In the Heights	Myron Kerstein
2022	Everything Everywhere All at Once	Paul Rogers
2023	Anatomy of a Fall	Laurent Sénéchal
2024	September 5	Hansjörg Weißbrich
2025	Marty Supreme	Ronald Bronstein and Josh Safdie
