= List of accolades received by V for Vendetta (film) =

Awards & Nominations
Award	Won	Nominated
Art Directors Guild	0	1
Brothers Manaki International Film Festival	1	1
Chicago Film Critics Association Award	0	1
Costume Designers Guild Award	0	1
GLAAD Media Award	0	1
Golden Trailer Award	0	1
Hugo Award	0	1
International Film Music Critics Award	0	1
Internet Movie Poster Award	0	1
San Diego Film Critics Society Award	1	1
Satellite Award	0	3
Saturn Award	1	4
St. Louis Gateway Film Critics Association Award	0	1
Teen Choice Award	0	2
Visual Effects Society Awards	0	1
- Total number of wins and nominations
Totals	3	21
- References

V for Vendetta is a 2006 dystopian thriller film directed by first-time filmmaker James McTeigue with a screenplay written by the Wachowski sisters. The film was produced by the latter and Joel Silver. It is based on the comic book series of the same name by Alan Moore and David Lloyd. It starred Natalie Portman, Hugo Weaving, Stephen Rea, and John Hurt. The film had its world premiere at the Berlin International Film Festival on February 12, 2006. It was released March 17, 2006 in the United States, United Kingdom, and six other countries; it topped that week's US box office. Its worldwide gross was $132,511,035.

V for Vendetta garnered various awards and nominations following its release, with most nominations recognizing the film overall. In addition, V for Vendetta was included in a number of best film lists for 2006, including a list authored by director Kevin Smith. Fandomania named the character V the 96th greatest fictional character of all time.

== Awards and nominations ==
Award	Date of ceremony	Category	Recipients	Result
Art Directors Guild	February 17, 2007	Excellence In Production Design For A Fantasy Feature Film	Owen Paterson	Nominated
Brothers Manaki International Film Festival	2006	Special Award	V for Vendetta	Won
Chicago Film Critics Association Awards	December 28, 2006	Most Promising Director	James McTeigue	Nominated
Costume Designers Guild Awards	February 17, 2007	Excellence in Fantasy Film	Sammy Sheldon	Nominated
GLAAD Media Awards	April 14, 2007	Outstanding Film - Wide Release	V for Vendetta	Nominated
Golden Trailer Awards	June 1, 2006	Best Action	V for Vendetta	Nominated
Hugo Awards	2007	Best Dramatic Presentation, Long Form	V for Vendetta	Nominated
International Film Music Critics Awards	2006	Best Single Cue of 2006	Dario Marianelli - "Evey Reborn"	Nominated
Internet Movie Poster Awards	January 2007	Best Serious Tagline	People should not be afraid of their governments. Governments should be afraid of their people. - V for Vendetta	Nominated
San Diego Film Critics Society Awards	2006	Best Production Design	Owen Paterson	Won
Satellite Awards	December 18, 2006	Best Art Direction and Production Design	Owen Paterson, Marco Bittner Rosser, Sarah Horton, Sebastian T. Krawinkel, Stephan O. Gessler	Nominated
Satellite Awards	December 18, 2006	Best Visual Effects	Dan Glass	Nominated
Satellite Awards	December 18, 2006	Best Overall DVD	V for Vendetta	Nominated
Saturn Award	March 10, 2007	Best Science Fiction Film	V for Vendetta	Nominated
Saturn Award	March 10, 2007	Best Actress	Natalie Portman	Won
Saturn Award	March 10, 2007	Best Writing	The Wachowski sisters	Nominated
Saturn Award	March 10, 2007	Best Costume	Sammy Sheldon	Nominated
St. Louis Gateway Film Critics Association Awards	January 7, 2007	Best Visual/Special Effects	V for Vendetta	Nominated
Teen Choice Awards	August 20, 2006	Movies - Choice Action Adventure	V for Vendetta	Nominated
Teen Choice Awards	August 20, 2006	Movies - Choice Actress: Drama/Action Adventure	Natalie Portman	Nominated
Visual Effects Society Awards	February 12, 2007	Outstanding Models and Miniatures in a Motion Picture	José Granell, Nigel Stone	Nominated

== See also ==
- 2006 in film
