= Online Film Critics Society Awards 2006 =

10th Online Film Critics Society Awards

10th Online Film Critics Society Awards

January 8, 2007

Best Picture:
United 93

The 10th Online Film Critics Society Awards, honoring the best in film for 2006, were given on 8 January 2007.

== Winners and nominees ==
=== Best Picture ===
United 93

- Babel
- Children of Men
- The Departed
- Pan's Labyrinth

=== Best Director ===
Martin Scorsese – The Departed

- Alfonso Cuarón – Children of Men
- Guillermo del Toro – Pan's Labyrinth
- Alejandro González Iñárritu – Babel
- Paul Greengrass – United 93

=== Best Actor ===
Forest Whitaker – The Last King of Scotland

- Sacha Baron Cohen – Borat
- Leonardo DiCaprio – The Departed
- Ryan Gosling – Half Nelson
- Peter O'Toole – Venus

=== Best Actress ===
Helen Mirren – The Queen

- Penélope Cruz – Volver
- Judi Dench – Notes on a Scandal
- Meryl Streep – The Devil Wears Prada
- Kate Winslet – Little Children

=== Best Supporting Actor ===
Jackie Earle Haley – Little Children

- Alan Arkin – Little Miss Sunshine
- Eddie Murphy – Dreamgirls
- Jack Nicholson – The Departed
- Mark Wahlberg – The Departed

=== Best Supporting Actress ===
Abigail Breslin – Little Miss Sunshine

- Adriana Barraza – Babel
- Cate Blanchett – Notes on a Scandal
- Jennifer Hudson – Dreamgirls
- Rinko Kikuchi – Babel

=== Best Original Screenplay ===
Pan's Labyrinth – Guillermo del Toro

- Babel – Guillermo Arriaga
- Little Miss Sunshine – Michael Arndt
- The Queen – Peter Morgan
- United 93 – Paul Greengrass

=== Best Adapted Screenplay ===
Children of Men – David Arata, Alfonso Cuarón, Mark Fergus, Hawk Ostby and Timothy J. Sexton

- The Departed – William Monahan
- Little Children – Todd Field and Tom Perrotta
- The Prestige – Jonathan Nolan and Christopher Nolan
- Thank You for Smoking – Jason Reitman

=== Best Foreign Language Film ===
Pan's Labyrinth

- The Death of Mr. Lazarescu
- L'Enfant
- Volver
- Water

=== Best Documentary ===
An Inconvenient Truth

- Dave Chappelle's Block Party
- Jesus Camp
- Neil Young: Heart of Gold
- Shut Up & Sing

=== Best Animated Feature ===
A Scanner Darkly

- Cars
- Happy Feet
- Monster House
- Over the Hedge

=== Best Cinematography ===
Children of Men – Emmanuel Lubezki

- Apocalypto – Dean Semler
- Babel – Rodrigo Prieto
- The Fountain – Matthew Libatique
- Pan's Labyrinth – Guillermo Navarro

=== Best Editing ===
United 93 – Clare Douglas, Richard Pearson and Christopher Rouse

- Babel – Douglas Crise and Stephen Mirrione
- Children of Men – Alfonso Cuarón and Alex Rodríguez
- The Departed – Thelma Schoonmaker
- The Fountain – Jay Rabinowitz

=== Best Original Score ===
The Fountain – Clint Mansell

- Babel – Gustavo Santaolalla
- The Illusionist – Philip Glass
- Notes on a Scandal – Philip Glass
- Pan's Labyrinth – Javier Navarrete

=== Breakthrough Filmmaker ===
Jonathan Dayton and Valerie Faris – Little Miss Sunshine

- Ryan Fleck – Half Nelson
- Rian Johnson – Brick
- Neil Marshall – The Descent
- Jason Reitman – Thank You for Smoking

=== Breakthrough Performer ===
Sacha Baron Cohen – Borat

- Shareeka Epps – Half Nelson
- Jennifer Hudson – Dreamgirls
- Rinko Kikuchi – Babel
- Elliot Page (Note: Credited as Ellen Page; Hard Candy was released before Page came out as transgender.) – Hard Candy
