= American Cinema Editors Awards 2007 =

57th ACE Eddie Awards
- Presented by: American Cinema Editors
- Date: February 18, 2007
- Site: The Beverly Hilton, Beverly Hills, California

Highlights
- Best Film: Drama: Babel and The Departed
- Best Film: Musical or Comedy: Dreamgirls

The 57th ACE Eddie Awards of the American Cinema Editors were given on 18 February 2007 in the International Ballroom at the Beverly Hilton Hotel, Los Angeles, California, USA.

== Winners and nominees ==
=== Film ===
- Best Edited Feature Film - Drama (tie):
  - Babel - Douglas Crise and Stephen Mirrione
  - The Departed - Thelma Schoonmaker
- Best Edited Feature Film - Musical or Comedy:
  - Dreamgirls - Virginia Katz
- Best Edited Documentary Film:
  - An Inconvenient Truth - Jay Cassidy and Dan Swietlik

=== TV ===
- Best Edited Miniseries or Motion Picture for Commercial Television
  - The Path to 9/11

== Nominees ==
=== Film ===
- Best Edited Feature Film - Drama:
  - Casino Royale - Stuart Baird
  - The Queen - Lucia Zucchetti
  - United 93 - Clare Douglas, Christopher Rouse and Richard Pearson
- Best Edited Feature Film - Musical or Comedy:
  - The Devil Wears Prada - Mark Livolsi
  - Little Miss Sunshine - Pamela Martin
  - Pirates of the Caribbean: Dead Man's Chest - Craig Wood and Stephen E. Rivkin
  - Thank You for Smoking - Dana E. Glauberman
- Best Edited Documentary Film
  - When the Levees Broke: A Requiem in Four Acts (Part One) - Samuel D. Pollard
  - Baghdad ER - Patrick McMahon and Carrie Goldman

== Sources ==
- ACE Award 2007 at the Internet Movie Database
