= Christopher Rouse =

Christopher Rouse may refer to:

- Christopher Rouse (composer) (1949–2019), music composer
- Christopher Rouse (film editor) (born 1958), American film editor
