= San Diego Film Critics Society Awards 2006 =

Annual US film awards ceremony

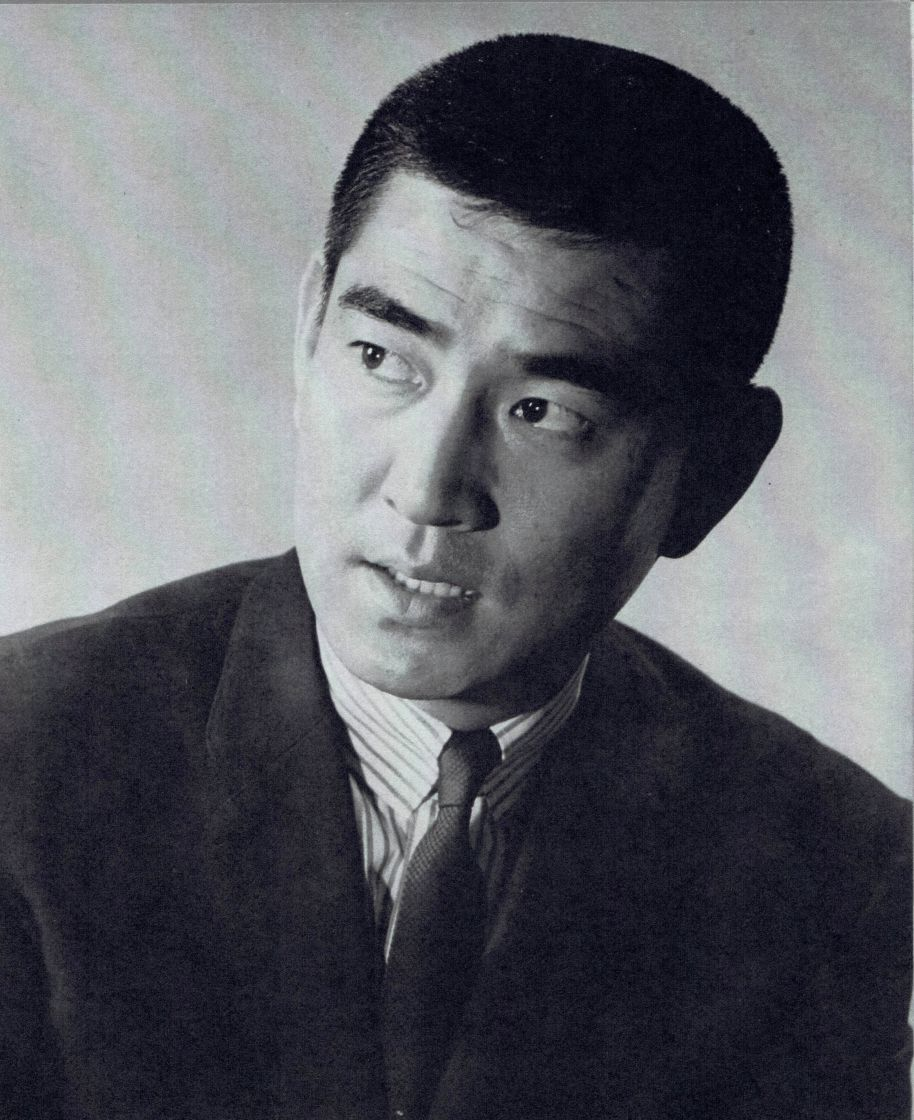
Ken Takakura, winner of "Best Actor"

11th SDFCS Awards

2006

Best Film:
Letters from Iwo Jima

The 11th San Diego Film Critics Awards, honoring the best in film for 2006, were given in 2006 by the San Diego Film Critics Society.

Clint Eastwood's war drama Letters from Iwo Jima won the awards for Best Film and Best Director. Japanese actor Ken Takakura won the award for Best Actor for his role in Riding Alone for Thousands of Miles. The film also won the awards for Best Foreign Language Film. Helen Mirren won for her role as Queen Elizabeth II in The Queen.

== Winners ==
- Best Actor:
  - Ken Takakura – Riding Alone for Thousands of Miles (Qian li zou dan qi)
- Best Actress:
  - Helen Mirren – The Queen
- Best Cast:
  - Babel
- Best Cinematography:
  - The Illusionist – Dick Pope
- Best Director:
  - Clint Eastwood – Letters from Iwo Jima
- Best Editing:
  - United 93 – Clare Douglas, Richard Pearson, and Christopher Rouse
- Best Film:
  - Letters from Iwo Jima
- Best Foreign Language Film:
  - Riding Alone for Thousands of Miles (Qian li zou dan qi) • Hong Kong/China/Japan
- Best Non-Fiction Film:
  - Shut Up & Sing
- Best Production Design:
  - V for Vendetta – Owen Paterson
- Best Score:
  - "Babel" – Gustavo Santaolalla
- Best Screenplay – Adapted:
  - Thank You for Smoking – Jason Reitman
- Best Screenplay – Original:
  - The Dead Girl – Karen Moncrieff
- Best Supporting Actor:
  - Ray Winstone – The Proposition
- Best Supporting Actress:
  - Lili Taylor – Factotum
