= Online Film Critics Society Award for Best Editing =

Annual film award

The Online Film Critics Society Award for Best Editing is an annual film award given by the Online Film Critics Society to honor the best editing of the year. These awards are noted in the established print media such as Variety and The Hollywood Reporter.

== Winners ==
This list of the annual winners is extracted from the annual lists of nominees and winners posted by the Online Film Critics Society. The nominees and awards are also posted at the Internet Movie Database.

=== 1990s ===
Year	Winner	Editor(s)
1998	Saving Private Ryan	Michael Kahn
1999	Run Lola Run (Lola rennt)	Mathilde Bonnefoy

=== 2000s ===
Year	Winner	Editor(s)
2000	Requiem for a Dream	Jay Rabinowitz
2001	no award	—
2002	The Lord of the Rings: The Two Towers	Michael J. Horton and Jabez Olssen
2003	no award	—
2004	Eternal Sunshine of the Spotless Mind	Valdís Óskarsdóttir
2005	Sin City	Robert Rodriguez
2006	United 93	Clare Douglas, Richard Pearson, and Christopher Rouse
2007	No Country for Old Men	Roderick Jaynes
2008	Slumdog Millionaire	Chris Dickens
2009	The Hurt Locker	Chris Innis and Bob Murawski

=== 2010s ===
Year	Winner	Editor(s)
2010	Inception	Lee Smith
2011	The Tree of Life	Hank Corwin, Jay Rabinowitz, Daniel Rezende, Billy Weber, and Mark Yoshikawa
2012	Cloud Atlas	Alexander Berner
2013	Gravity	Alfonso Cuarón and Mark Sanger
2014	Birdman	Douglas Crise and Stephen Mirrione
2015	Mad Max: Fury Road	Margaret Sixel
2016	La La Land	Tom Cross
2017	Dunkirk	Lee Smith
2018	Mission: Impossible – Fallout	Eddie Hamilton
2019	Parasite	Yang Jin-mo

=== 2020s ===
Year	Winner	Editor(s)
2020	Nomadland	Chloé Zhao
2021	The Power of the Dog	Peter Sciberras
2022	Everything Everywhere All at Once	Paul Rogers
2023	Oppenheimer	Jennifer Lame
2024	Challengers	Marco Costa
