= Lewis Alsamari =

Iraqi actor (born 1976)

- Born: 1976 (age 49–50); Iraq

Lewis Alsamari (born 1976) is an Iraqi actor based in the United Kingdom.

== Career ==
Alsamari has appeared in episodes of television series such as Spooks and Crossroads. In 2006 he starred in the Universal Pictures film United 93 as the terrorist Saeed al-Ghamdi.

Alsamari was reported to have been denied a visa by American immigration authorities when he applied to visit New York City to attend the premiere of United 93. The reason reportedly given was that he had once been a conscripted member of the Iraqi Army – although this was also the grounds for his refugee status after his desertion in 1993. Other sources say that he applied late for his visa and that it was not denied.

Alsamari was featured in the Edinburgh Festival Fringe production of "What I Heard About Iraq", based on the Eliot Weinberger article of the same name that originally appeared in the London Review of Books in 2005.

== Filmography ==
Year	Title	Role	Notes
2006	United 93	Saeed Al Ghamdi	

== Bibliography ==
- Alsamari, Lewis (July 2007). Out of Iraq. United Kingdom: Bantam Press. ISBN 978-0593058237.
