= Letters from Iwo Jima =

2006 American film by Clint Eastwood

- Theatrical release poster
- Directed by: Clint Eastwood
- Screenplay by: Iris Yamashita
- Story by: Iris Yamashita; Paul Haggis
- Based on: Picture Letters from Commander in Chief by Tadamichi Kuribayashi (author); Tsuyuko Yoshida (editor)
- Produced by: Clint Eastwood; Robert Lorenz; Steven Spielberg
- Starring: Ken Watanabe; Kazunari Ninomiya; Tsuyoshi Ihara; Ryō Kase; Shidō Nakamura
- Cinematography: Tom Stern
- Edited by: Joel Cox; Gary D. Roach
- Music by: Kyle Eastwood; Michael Stevens
- Production companies: DreamWorks Pictures; Malpaso Productions; Amblin Entertainment
- Distributed by: Warner Bros. Pictures
- Release dates: December 9, 2006 (Japan); December 20, 2006 (United States)
- Running time: 140 minutes
- Country: United States
- Languages: Japanese; English
- Budget: $19 million
- Box office: $68.7 million

Letters from Iwo Jima (Japanese: 硫黄島からの手紙, Hepburn: Iōjima Kara no Tegami) is a 2006 American Japanese-language war film directed and co-produced by Clint Eastwood, starring Ken Watanabe and Kazunari Ninomiya. The film portrays the Battle of Iwo Jima from the perspective of the Japanese soldiers and is a companion piece to Eastwood's Flags of Our Fathers, which depicts the same battle from the American viewpoint; the two films were shot back to back. Letters from Iwo Jima is almost entirely in Japanese with a few English sequences, despite being co-produced by American companies DreamWorks Pictures, Malpaso Productions and Amblin Entertainment.

Letters from Iwo Jima was released in Japan on December 9, 2006, and received a limited release in the United States on December 20, by Warner Bros. Pictures, in order to be eligible for consideration for the 79th Academy Awards, for which it received four nominations, including Best Picture and winning Best Sound Editing. It was subsequently released in more areas of the United States on January 12, 2007, and was released in most states on January 19. An English-dubbed version of the film premiered on April 7, 2008. Upon release, Letters from Iwo Jima received critical acclaim and grossed $68.7 million at the box office from a $19 million production budget.

== Plot ==
In 2005, Japanese archaeologists find something buried during an exploration of tunnels on Iwo Jima.

In 1944 Iwo Jima, Private First Class Saigo, a conscripted baker who misses his family, is digging beach defence trenches with his platoon when Lieutenant General Tadamichi Kuribayashi arrives to take command of the garrison. He saves Saigo from a beating by Captain Tanida for being "unpatriotic", and orders the garrison to tunnel underground defenses throughout the island.

Kuribayashi and Lieutenant Colonel Baron Takeichi Nishi, an Olympic gold medalist show jumper, clash with the other officers, who disagree with Kuribayashi's defense in depth strategy. Japan cannot send reinforcements and Kuribayashi believes tunnels and mountain bunkers stand a better chance of holding out than relying entirely on beach defenses. Poor nutrition and unsanitary conditions lead to many fatal dysentery cases. Superior Private Shimizu, whom Saigo suspects is a spy from the Kempeitai sent to report on disloyal soldiers, arrives with new replacements.

U.S. Marines land on the island after several days of bombardment by American aircraft and warships. Despite heavy casualties, the Marines secure a beachhead and attack Mount Suribachi. While delivering a message from Captain Tanida to Colonel Adachi, Saigo overhears Kuribayashi's retreat orders over the radio. Adachi orders his unit to commit honorable suicide. Saigo convinces Shimizu to disobey, retreat, and fight on.

Saigo and Shimizu flee Mount Suribachi, and survive a Marine ambush that kills many others. On reaching safety, Lieutenant Ito accuses them of cowardice. They are about to be summarily executed when Kuribayashi arrives and confirms his order to retreat. Against Kuribayashi's orders, Ito leads a failed attack on US positions. Lt. Col. Nishi reprimands Ito for his insubordination, prompting Ito to carry several land mines into the American lines and throw himself under a US tank.

Shimizu confesses to Saigo he was dishonorably discharged from the Kempeitai after disobeying an order to kill a family's barking dog. Nishi befriends a dying Marine and reads a letter from the Marine's mother after he dies, garnering sympathy from the Japanese soldiers. When Nishi is blinded by shrapnel he orders his men to withdraw and commits suicide.

Saigo and Shimizu decide to surrender. Shimizu is spotted by an officer leaving Japanese lines, and escapes before Saigo can join him. Shimizu is captured, then executed by the Marines. Saigo flees with others to Kuribayashi's headquarters. Kuribayashi orders a counter-attack and tells Saigo to stay behind and destroy any vital documents, saving his life for a third time.

Kuribayashi leads a final night attack on a Marine encampment. Most of his men are killed, and Kuribayashi is critically wounded and dragged away by his aide, Lt. Fujita. Ito, unable to complete his suicidal mission, is captured. Kuribayashi orders Fujita to behead him with his Guntō, but Fujita is killed by a Marine sniper. Saigo arrives, having buried a bag of letters before leaving headquarters. Kuribayashi asks Saigo to bury him where he will not be found, then draws his pistol — a M1911 gifted to him in the US before the war — and commits suicide. Saigo dutifully buries him.

Later, a Marine platoon finds Fujita's body. Saigo reappears and attacks them, infuriated to see an American has taken Kuribayashi's pistol. Saigo is subdued and taken to the beach to recover alongside wounded Marines. Awakening on a stretcher, he glimpses the setting sun and smiles.

Back in the present, the archaeologists complete their dig and reveal the letters Saigo had buried. As the letters spill out from an opened bag, the voices of the Japanese soldiers who wrote them are heard.

== Cast ==
- Ken Watanabe as General Tadamichi Kuribayashi
- Kazunari Ninomiya as Private First Class Saigo
- Tsuyoshi Ihara as Lieutenant Colonel Baron Takeichi Nishi
- Ryō Kase as Superior Private Shimizu
- Shidō Nakamura as Lieutenant Ito
- Hiroshi Watanabe as Lieutenant Fujita
- Takumi Bando as Captain Tanida
- Yuki Matsuzaki as Private First Class Nozaki
- Takashi Yamaguchi as Private First Class Kashiwara
- Eijiro Ozaki as Lieutenant Okubo
- Alan Sato as Sergeant Ondo
- Nae Yuuki as Hanako, Saigo's wife (in a flashback)
- Nobumasa Sakagami as Admiral Ohsugi
- Masashi Nagadoi as Admiral Ichimaru
- Akiko Shima as lead woman (in a flashback)
- Luke Eberl as Sam, wounded U.S. Marine (credited as Lucas Elliot)
- Jeremy Glazer as U.S. Marine Lieutenant
- Ikuma Ando as Ozawa
- Mark Moses as U.S. Army officer (in a flashback)
- Roxanne Hart as U.S. Army officer's wife
- Evan Ellingson as Kid Marine
- Nori Bunasawa as Japanese journalist

== Production ==
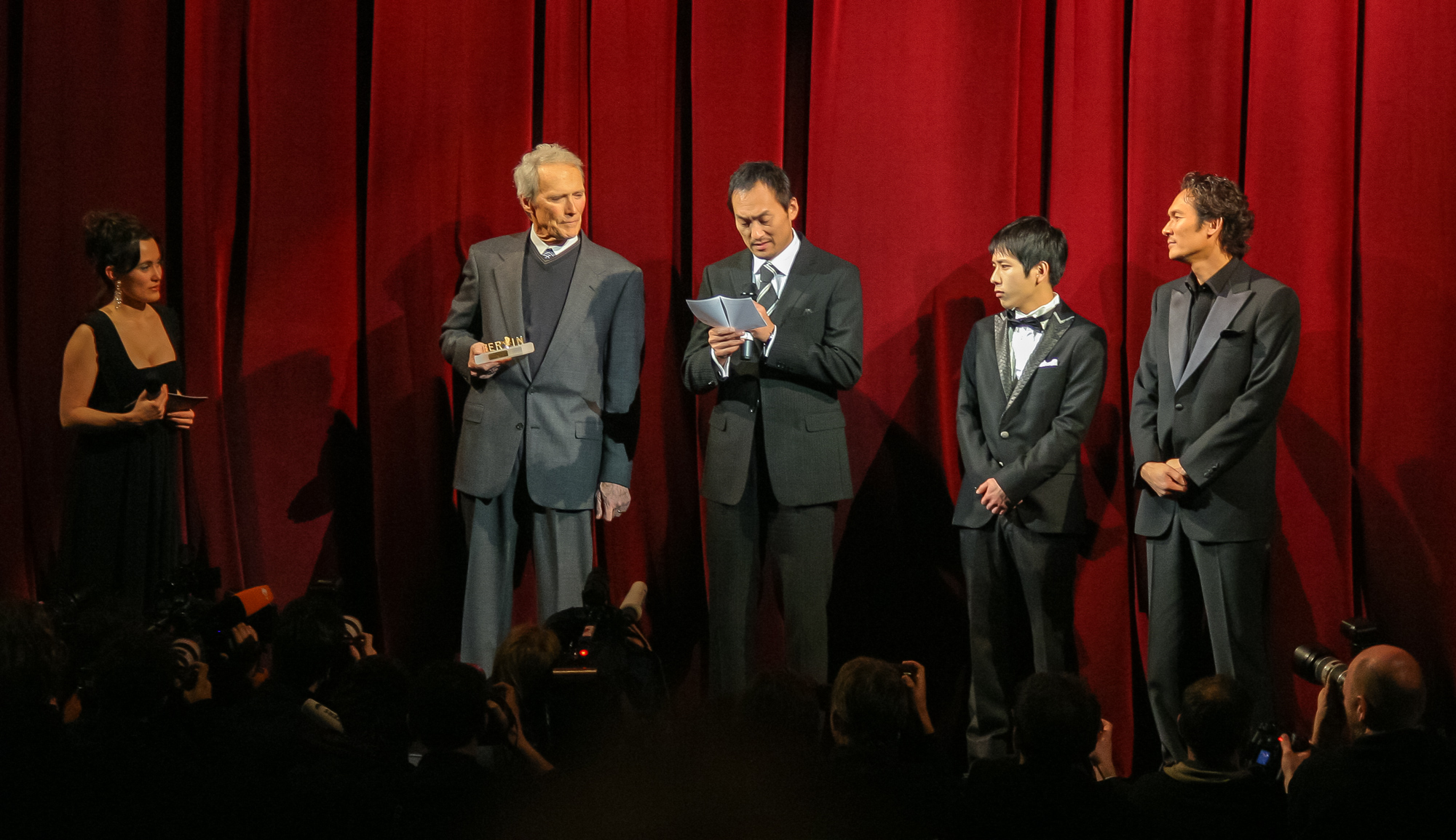
Clint Eastwood, Ken Watanabe, Kazunari Ninomiya and Tsuyoshi Ihara after a screening at the Berlinale 2007

Although the film is set in Japan, it was filmed primarily in Barstow and Bakersfield in California. All Japanese cast except for Ken Watanabe were selected through auditions. Filming in California wrapped on April 8, and the cast and crew then headed back to the studio in Los Angeles for more scenes.

Ken Watanabe filmed a portion of his scenes on location on Iwo Jima. Locations on Iwo Jima which were used for filming included beaches, towns, and Mount Suribachi. Because the crew were only allowed to film minor scenes on Iwo Jima, most of the battle scenes were filmed in Iceland. Filming in Los Angeles lasted for approximately two months, and other locations across the US including Virginia, Chicago, and Houston.

The filmmakers had to be given special permission from the Tokyo Metropolitan Government to film on Iwo Jima, because the remains of more than 10,000 missing Japanese soldiers are there. The Japan Maritime Self-Defense Force (JMSDF) operates a naval air base on Iwo Jima, which is used by the United States Navy for operations such as nighttime carrier landing practice. Civilian access to the island is restricted to those attending memorial services for American Marines and Japanese soldiers.

The battleship USS Texas (BB-35), which was used in closeup shots of the fleet (for both movies), also participated in the actual attack on Iwo Jima for five days. The only character to appear in both Flags of Our Fathers and Letters From Iwo Jima is Charles W. Lindberg, played by Alessandro Mastrobuono.

=== Sources ===
The film is based on the non-fiction books "Gyokusai sōshikikan" no etegami ("Picture letters from the Commander in Chief") by General Tadamichi Kuribayashi (portrayed on screen by Ken Watanabe) and So Sad To Fall In Battle: An Account of War by Kumiko Kakehashi about the Battle of Iwo Jima. While some characters such as Saigo are fictional, the overall battle as well as several of the commanders are based upon actual people and events.

== Reception ==
=== Critical response ===
==== In the United States ====
Letters from Iwo Jima was critically acclaimed, and well noted for its portrayal of good and evil on both sides of the battle. The critics heavily praised the writing, direction, cinematography and acting. The review tallying website Rotten Tomatoes reported that 184 out of the 202 reviews they tallied were positive for a score of 91%, and an average rating of 8.20/10, and a certification of "fresh". The site's consensus states: "A powerfully humanistic portrayal of the perils of war, this companion piece to Flags of Our Fathers is potent and thought-provoking, and it demonstrates Clint Eastwood's maturity as a director." Metacritic gave the movie a score of 89 based on 37 reviews, indicating "universal acclaim". Lisa Schwarzbaum of Entertainment Weekly, Kenneth Turan of the Los Angeles Times, and Richard Schickel of Time were among many critics to name it the best picture of the year. In addition, Peter Travers of Rolling Stone and Michael Phillips of the Chicago Tribune both gave it four stars, and Todd McCarthy of Variety praised the film, assigning it a rare 'A' rating.

On December 6, 2006, the National Board of Review of Motion Pictures named Letters from Iwo Jima the best film of 2006. On December 10, 2006, the Los Angeles Film Critics Association named Letters from Iwo Jima Best Picture of 2006. Furthermore, Clint Eastwood was runner-up for directing honors. In addition, the American Film Institute named it one of the 10 best films of 2006. It was also named Best Film in a Foreign Language on January 15 during the 64th Annual Golden Globe Awards, while Clint Eastwood held a nomination for Best Director.

CNN's Tom Charity in his review described Letters from Iwo Jima as "the only American movie of the year I won't hesitate to call a masterpiece." On the "Best Films of the Year 2006" broadcast (December 31, 2006) of the television show Ebert & Roeper, Richard Roeper listed the film at #3 and guest critic A. O. Scott listed it at number one, claiming that the film was "close to perfect". James Berardinelli awarded a three out of four-star review, concluding that although both 'Letters' and 'Flags' were imperfect but interesting, 'Letters from Iwo Jima' was more focused, strong and straightforward than its companion piece.

On January 23, 2007, the film received four Academy Award nominations. Eastwood was nominated for his directing, as well as Best Picture along with producers Steven Spielberg and Robert Lorenz. It was also nominated for Best Original Screenplay. The film took home one award, Best Sound Editing.

The film appeared on many critics' top ten lists of the best films of 2006, including 157 top ten lists in North America with 25 number one spots.

The February 2020 issue of New York Magazine lists Letters from Iwo Jima as among "The Best Movies That Lost Best Picture at the Oscars."

==== In Japan ====
The film was far more commercially successful in Japan than in the U.S., ranking number 1 for five weeks, and receiving a warm reception from both Japanese audiences and critics. The Japanese critics noted that Clint Eastwood presented Kuribayashi as a "caring, erudite commander of Japan's Iwo Jima garrison, along with Japanese soldiers in general, in a sensitive, respectful way." Also, the Japanese newspaper Asahi Shimbun noted that the movie is clearly "distinguishable" from previous Hollywood movies, which tended to portray Japanese characters with non-Japanese actors (e.g., Chinese-Americans, and other Asian-Americans). Consequently, incorrect Japanese grammar and non-native accents were conspicuous in those former films, jarring their realism for the Japanese audience. In contrast, most Japanese roles in Letters from Iwo Jima are played by native Japanese actors. Also, the article praised the film's new approach, as it is scripted with excellent research into Japanese society at that time. According to the article, previous Hollywood movies describing Japan were based on the stereotypical images of Japanese society, which looked "weird" to native Japanese audiences. Letters from Iwo Jima is remarkable as the movie that tries to escape from the stereotypes. Owing to the lack of stereotypes, Letters from Iwo Jima was appreciated by Japanese critics and audiences.

Since the film was successful in Japan, a tourist boom has been reported on the Ogasawara islands, of which Iwo Jima is part.

Despite favorable reviews, the film only grossed $13.7 million in the United States. Foreign sales of $54.9 million helped to boost revenue over production costs of $19 million.

=== Awards and honors ===
Award	Category	Recipient	Result
Academy Awards	Best Picture	Clint Eastwood, Steven Spielberg and Robert Lorenz	Nominated
Academy Awards	Best Director	Clint Eastwood	Nominated
Academy Awards	Best Original Screenplay	Iris Yamashita and Paul Haggis	Nominated
Academy Awards	Best Sound Editing	Alan Robert Murray and Bub Asman	Won
Golden Globe Awards	Best Foreign Language Film		Won
Golden Globe Awards	Best Director	Clint Eastwood	Nominated
Berlin Film Festival	Cinema for Peace	Clint Eastwood	Won
Critics' Choice Awards	Best Foreign Language Film		Won
Critics' Choice Awards	Best Picture		Nominated
Critics' Choice Awards	Best Director	Clint Eastwood	Nominated
Chicago Film Critics Association	Best Foreign Language Film		Won
Chicago Film Critics Association	Best Film		Nominated
Chicago Film Critics Association	Best Director	Clint Eastwood	Nominated
Chicago Film Critics Association	Best Original Screenplay	Iris Yamashita	Nominated
Chicago Film Critics Association	Best Original Score	Kyle Eastwood and Michael Stevens	Nominated
Dallas-Fort Worth Film Critics Association	Best Foreign Language Film		Won
Los Angeles Film Critics Association	Best Film		Won
National Board of Review	Best Film		Won
San Diego Film Critics Society:	Best Film		Won
San Diego Film Critics Society:	Best Director	Clint Eastwood	Won
Japan Academy Film Prize	Outstanding Foreign Language Film		Won

==== Top ten lists ====
- 1st – A.O. Scott, The New York Times
- 1st – Claudia Puig, USA Today
- 1st – Kenneth Turan, Los Angeles Times (tied with Flags of our Fathers)
- 1st – Lisa Schwarzbaum, Entertainment Weekly
- 1st – Richard Schickel, TIME
- 1st – Mike McStay, Socius
- 2nd – Frank Scheck, The Hollywood Reporter
- 2nd – Kirk Honeycutt, The Hollywood Reporter
- 2nd – Manohla Dargis, The New York Times
- 2nd – Michael Wilmington, Chicago Tribune
- 2nd – Scott Foundas, LA Weekly (tied with Flags of our Fathers)
- 3rd – Jack Mathews, New York Daily News (tied with 'Flags of our Fathers)
- 3rd – Nathan Rabin, The A.V. Club
- 3rd – Peter Travers, Rolling Stone (tied with Flags of our Fathers)
- 3rd – Shawn Levy, The Oregonian (tied with Flags of our Fathers)
- 3rd – Richard Roeper, Chicago Sun-Times (tied with Flags of our Fathers)
- 4th – David Ansen, Newsweek
- 4th – Marjorie Baumgarten, The Austin Chronicle
- 5th – Michael Phillips, Chicago Tribune
- 5th – Michael Rechtshaffen, The Hollywood Reporter
- 5th – Stephen Holden, The New York Times
- 5th – Ty Burr, The Boston Globe
- 6th – Keith Phipps, The A.V. Club
- 9th – Rene Rodriguez, The Miami Herald

General top ten

- Carrie Rickey, The Philadelphia Inquirer
- Joe Morgenstern, The Wall Street Journal
- Peter Rainer, The Christian Science Monitor
- Steven Rea, The Philadelphia Inquirer

==== Other honors ====
The film is recognized by American Film Institute in these lists:

- 2008: AFI's 10 Top 10:
  - Nominated Epic Film

== Home media ==
Letters from Iwo Jima was released on DVD by Warner Home Video on May 22, 2007. It was also released on HD DVD and Blu-ray Disc. Furthermore, it was made available for instant viewing with Netflix's "Watch Instantly" feature where available. The film was re-released in 2010 as part of Clint Eastwood's tribute collection Clint Eastwood: 35 Films 35 Years at Warner Bros. The Two-Disc Special Collector's Edition DVD is also available in a Five-Disc Commemorative Set, which also includes the Two-Disc Special Collector's Edition of Flags of Our Fathers and a bonus fifth disc containing History Channel's "Heroes of Iwo Jima" documentary and To the Shores of Iwo Jima, a documentary produced by the U.S. Navy and Marine Corps.

The English-dubbed version of DVD was released on June 1, 2010. This version was first aired on cable channel AMC on April 26, 2008.

== Bibliography ==
- Eliot, Marc (2009). American Rebel: The Life of Clint Eastwood. Harmony Books. ISBN 978-0-307-33688-0.
