= Rinosuke Ichimaru =

Imperial Japanese Navy vice admiral (1891–1945)

- 市丸 利之助
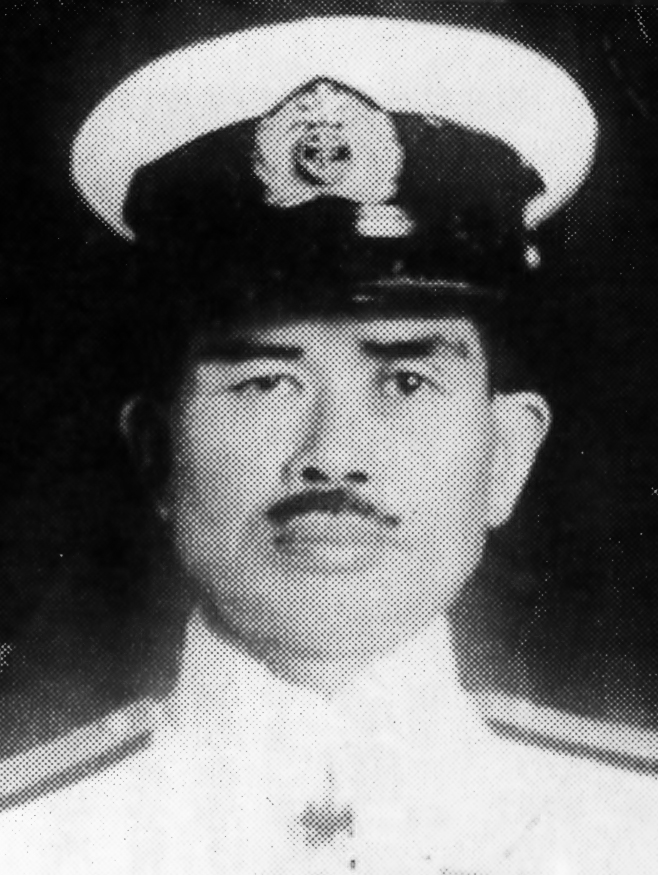
- Born: 20 September 1891; Karatsu, Saga, Japan
- Died: 26 March 1945 (aged 53); Iwo Jima, Japan
- Other name: Toshinosuke Ichimaru
- Education: Etajima Naval Academy; Naval Artillery School
- Spouse: Sueko Ichimaru
- Children: Haruko Ichimaru
- Military career
- Allegiance: Empire of Japan
- Branch: Imperial Japanese Navy
- Service years: 1913–1945
- Rank: Vice admiral (posthumous)
- Units: Azuma, Kongō, Izumo, Yokosuka Air Group, Hōshō, Kasumigaura Air Group, Sasebo Air Group, 1st Aircraft Division, Kaga, Chinkai Guard District, 1st Naval District, Suzuka Air Group, 3rd Air Fleet
- Commands: Ōmura Air Group, Chinkai Air Group, Yokohama Air Group, Chichijima Air Group, 13th Air Group, 1st Attack Force, 21st Air Flotilla, 13th Airborne Group, 27th Air Flotilla, Iwo Jima
- Conflicts: World War I; Second Sino-Japanese War; Battle of Wuhan; World War II; Pacific War; Guadalcanal campaign; Battle of the Eastern Solomons; Battle of Iwo Jima †
- Other work: Aviator, poet

Rinosuke Ichimaru (市丸 利之助, Ichimaru Rinosuke; 20 September 1891 – 26 March 1945), also known as Toshinosuke Ichimaru, was an officer, aviator and vice admiral in the Imperial Japanese Navy during World War II.

He was an early pioneer, then a fighter pilot, with the Imperial Japanese Navy Air Service. During World War II, he commanded numerous air units, and participated in the Guadalcanal campaign. In August 1944, he assumed command of the Imperial Naval forces present on Iwo Jima, and was killed in action during the Battle of Iwo Jima on 26 March 1945.

== Biography ==
Rinosuke Ichimaru was born in Karatsu, Saga Prefecture, on 20 September 1891. He graduated high school on 31 March 1910, and entered the Etajima Naval Academy that same year. He finished his studies on 19 December 1913, ranking 46th out of 118 cadets, and earning the rank of Ensign. He then embarked on the armored cruiser Azuma. On 11 August 1914, he started serving on the battle cruiser Kongō. On 24 October, he was transferred to the armored cruiser Izumo.

Ichimaru was promoted to the rank of sub-lieutenant on 1 December 1914. On 26 May 1915, he was assigned again to the armored cruiser Azuma, remaining on board until 1 September 1916, when he was switched back to the Kongō. On 1 December 1916, he began to attend basic course at the Naval Artillery School. On 1 June 1917, he started to study torpedoes. Passionate about the world of aviation, Rinosuke attended the course for pilots students of the Imperial Japanese Navy on 1 December 1917. On 1 January 1918, he was assigned as a military fighter pilot to the Yokosuka Air Group. On 25 September 1919, Rinosuke was transferred to the boarded air group, operating from the new aircraft carrier Hōshō. On 1 December, he was promoted to lieutenant and became an instructor at the Yokosuka Air Group. Four years later, on 1 December 1923, he was placed in charge of the Ōmura Air Group. He was later transferred to the Kasumigaura Air Group on 7 January 1925. On 1 December of the same year he was appointed to the rank of lieutenant commander.

=== Flight instructor ===
In July 1926, he was involved in an accident during a test flight on a fighter that caused him serious fractures to the femur and other injuries to both the skull and the face. He took a long time to recover; according to the testimony of his daughter, Haruko Ichimaru, he spent three years recovering from his surgery and rehabilitation. However, he kept a limp all his life from this incident. During his recovery, he read many books, painted pictures and wrote poetry in Japanese and Chinese classic style, and became famous in poetry. On 1 December 1927, he returned to active service as an instructor at the Kasumigaura Flight School. He then returned to Yokosuka in November 1929, where on 1 December 1930 he was promoted to commander and became an official instructor. Three years later, on 1 December 1933, he became an executive officer at the Sasebo Air Group and on 1 November 1934, he was assigned to the General Staff of the 1st Aircraft Division. On 25 May 1935, still as an executive officer, he boarded the aircraft carrier Kaga.

=== Second Sino-Japanese War and World War II ===
On 15 October 1935, Ichimaru was assigned to the Chinkai Guard District in Korea, where he later took command of the Air Group on 1 October 1936. Exactly two months later, he was elevated to the rank of captain. The Second Sino-Japanese War broke out in July 1937, and four months later on 15 November, he became commander of the Yokohama Air Group. He held this position for only one month, and was then transferred on 15 December to the 1st Naval District where he took command. On 1 April 1939, he was transferred to take command of the Chichijima Air Group. On 6 November he changed units again and was placed in command of the 13th Air Group. He then participated in the war on the Asian continent, coordinating the bombing of the city of Wuhan. On 15 November 1940, he moved to the Suzuka Air Group and on 1 May 1942 he was promoted to the rank of rear admiral.

He was then sent to the South Pacific theater, where he took part in the Battle of the Eastern Solomons and the subsequent fighting in the long and exhausting Guadalcanal campaign, in command of the 1st Attack Force. The force suffered heavy losses. On 1 September 1942, he assumed command of the 21st Air Flotilla, but in 1943 he was recalled to Japan, where on 15 November he became commander of the 13th Airborne Group. On 5 August 1944, he was transferred to the General Staff of the 3rd Air Fleet and on the 10th he took command of the 27th Air Flotilla based on the island of Iwo Jima, south of the metropolitan archipelago.

=== Battle of Iwo Jima ===
Admiral Ichimaru landed on Iwo Jima on 10 August and replaced vice admiral Sadaichi Matsunaga, who was in disagreement with the garrison commander, Tadamichi Kuribayashi, about the defensive strategy to be adopted. In the days that followed, 2,126 sailors, aviators, and marines were placed under his orders. When all the planes of his flotilla were lost in the preliminary US bombing, he decided to place his troops under the command of Kuribayashi. Ichimaru did not share the defensive strategy of Kuribayashi, which included a defense in depth. The admiral would have preferred to immediately counter the landings, fighting on the beaches and defending the airfield of Minamiburaku. Despite the differences of opinion with the commander in chief, the men of Ichimaru actively collaborated in the defense and built 135 casemates.

When the US landings began on 19 February, Ichimaru led 7,347 Imperial Naval men. On 17 March, towards the end of the battle, he was believed to have been killed, and was promoted to the posthumous rank of vice admiral. However, he was still alive and the following day he led a desperate attack at the head of the last sixty Marines and still survived. Admiral Ichimaru is believed to have been killed by a barrage of machine gun fire on 26 March, while trying to abandon the cave in which he had taken refuge.

In the final days of the battle, Ichimaru wrote a letter addressed to US President Franklin D. Roosevelt, in which Ichimaru charged Roosevelt with vilifying pre-war Japan, and justified the decision of the Japanese government to enter the war as a reaction to the policy put in place by the United States that forced Japan on the offensive. The letter was placed in the stomach band of his communications officer, and an English version entrusted to Lieutenant Commander Kunio Akada. The letter was published in the New York Herald Tribune on 11 July, one week before the Potsdam Conference, and is today kept at the U.S. Naval Academy in Annapolis, Maryland.

Ichimaru's letter to President Roosevelt:

Rear Admiral R. Ichimaru of the Japanese Navy sends this note to Roosevelt. I have one word to give you upon the termination of this battle.

Approximately a century has elapsed since Nippon, after Commodore Perry's entry to Shimoda, became widely affiliated with the countries of the world. During this period of intercourse Nippon has met with many national crises as well as the undesired Sino-Japanese War, Russo-Japanese War, the World War, the Manchurian Incident, and the China Incident. Nippon is now, unfortunately, in a state of open conflict with your country. Judging Nippon from just this side of the screen you may slander our nation as a yellow peril, or a blood thirsty nation or maybe a protoplasm of military clique. Though you may use the surprise attack on Pearl Harbour as your primary material for propaganda, I believe you, of all persons, know best that you left Nippon no other method in order to save herself from self-destruction.

His Imperial Highness, as clearly shown in the "Rescript of the Founder of the Empire" "Yosei"(Justice), "Choki"(Sagacity) and "Sekkei"(Benevolence), contained in the above three fold doctrine, rules in the realization of "Hakko-ichiu"(the universe under His Sacred Rule) in His Gracious mind.

The realization of which means the habitation of their respective fatherlands under their own customs and traditions, thus insuring the everlasting peace of the world.

Emperor Meiji's "The four seas of the world that are united in brotherhood will know no high waves nor wind" (composed during the Russo-Japanese War) won the appraisal of your uncle, Theodore Roosevelt as you yourself know.

We, the Nippon-jin, though may follow all lines of trade, it is through our each walk of life that we support the Imperial doctrine. We, the soldiers of the Imperial Fighting Force take up arms to further the above stated "doctrine".

Though we, at the time, are externally taken by your air raids and shelling backed by your material superiority, spiritually we are burning with delight and enjoying the peace of mind.

This peacefulness of mind, the common universal stigma of the Nippon-jin, burning with fervour in the upholding of the Imperial Doctrine may be impossible for you and Churchill to understand. I hereupon pitying your spiritual feebleness pen a word or two.

Judging from your actions, white races especially you Anglo-Saxons at the sacrifice of the coloured races are monopolizing the fruits of the world.

In order to attain this end, countless machinations were used to cajole the yellow races, and to finally deprive them of any strength. Nippon in retaliation to your imperialism tried to free the oriental nations from your punitive bonds, only to be faced by your dogged opposition. You now consider your once friendly Nippon an harmful existence to your luscious plan, a bunch of barbarians that must be exterminated. The completion of this Greater East Asia War will bring about the birth of the East Asia Co-Prosperity Area, this in turn will in the near future result in the everlasting peace of the world, if, of course, is not hampered upon by your unending imperialism.

Why is it that you, an already flourishing nation, nip in bud the movement for the freedom of the suppressed nations of the East. It is no other than to return to the East that which belongs to the East.

It is beyond our contemplation when we try to understand your stinted narrowness. The existence of the East Asia Co-Prosperity sphere does not in any way encroach upon your safety as a nation, on the contrary, will sit as a pillar of world peace ensuring the happiness of the world. His Imperial Majesty's true aim is no other than the attainment of this everlasting peace.

Studying the condition of the never ending racial struggle resulting from mutual misunderstanding of the European countries, it is not difficult to feel the need of the everlasting universal peace.

Present Hitler's crusade of "His Fatherland" is brought about by no other than the stupidity of holding only Germany, the loser of the World War, solely responsible for the 1914-1918 calamity and the deprivation of Germany's re-establishment.

It is beyond my imagination of how you can slander Hitler's program and at the same time cooperate with Stalin's "Soviet Russia" which has as its principal aim the "socialization" of the World at large.

If only the brute force decides the ruler of the world, fighting will everlastingly be repeated, and never will the world know peace nor happiness.

Upon the attainment of your barbaric world monopoly never forget to retain in your mind the failure of your predecessor President Wilson at his heights.

=== Ichimaru's katana ===
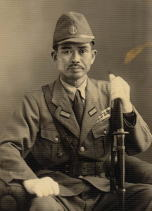
Photograph of Ichimaru and his sword

During the battle, the admiral wore his family sword, a blade from the Edo period. According to the testimony of his daughter Haruko, the sword had saved his life three times in the past. The first was when he was on board a plane, and got hit by a bullet that bounced off the bottom of the sword, therefore saving him. The blade was broken but Ichimaru had it repaired by a specialized blacksmith. During the fighting at Iwo Jima, he always kept his sword with him, but when his body was identified at the end of the attack, it had been taken. There was no news about the katana and in the agitation of the battle, the body of the admiral was lost, as was that of General Kuribayashi.

Twenty years after the battle, many books on Iwo Jima were published in the United States. One of these, Iwo Jima by Richard F. Newcomb, published in New York in 1965, included an annotation on the sword of Ichimaru. A history professor who had participated in the battle of Iwo Jima read the book and suspected that the sword he had bought for $25 as a war souvenir in New Jersey many years earlier was the admiral's sword. He carried out further research to identify the sword, and discovered that it was indeed the sword of Ichimaru. It was taken back to Japan by a Japanese war veteran who was visiting New York. The television network NHK TV organized a meeting in which the sword was presented to the admiral's widow, Sueko. She donated the sword to Karatsu Castle museum for public exhibition. However, the museum was robbed and the sword was stolen along with other objects on display. Sueko died shortly after the robbery. About three years later a doctor bought a sword at an antique shop and, noticing its uniqueness, had it examined. The weapon was identified as the sword of Ichimaru and was returned to the family, who still have custody of it today.

== In popular culture ==
Ichimaru is portrayed in Clint Eastwood's film Letters From Iwo Jima (2006). He is played by actor Masashi Nagadoi.
