= Chicago Film Critics Association Awards 2006 =

Annual US film awards ceremony

19th CFCA Awards

December 28, 2006

Best Film:
The Departed

The 19th Chicago Film Critics Association Awards, given by the CFCA on December 28, 2006 honored the best in film for 2006.

== Winners and nominees ==
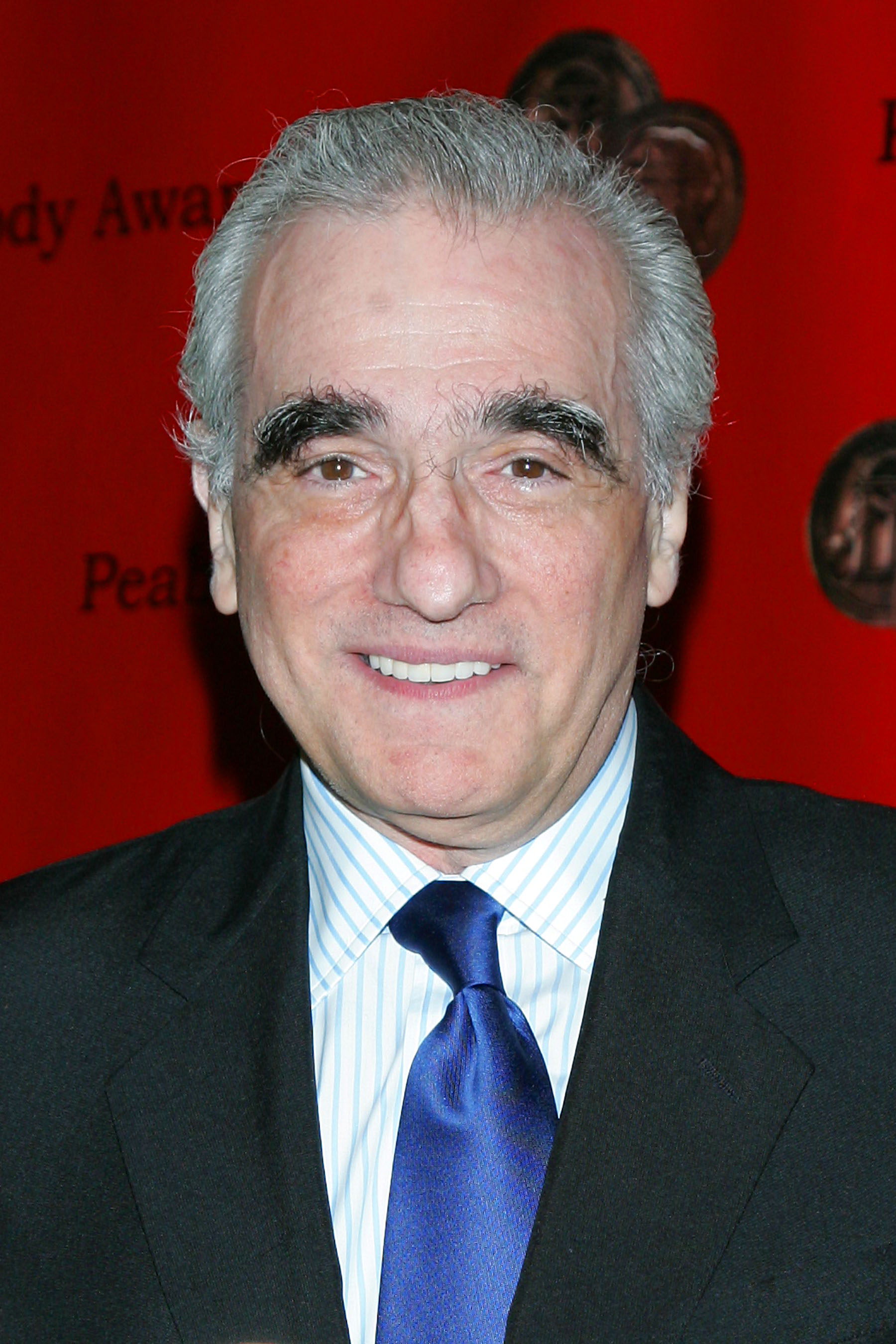
Martin Scorsese, Best Director winner

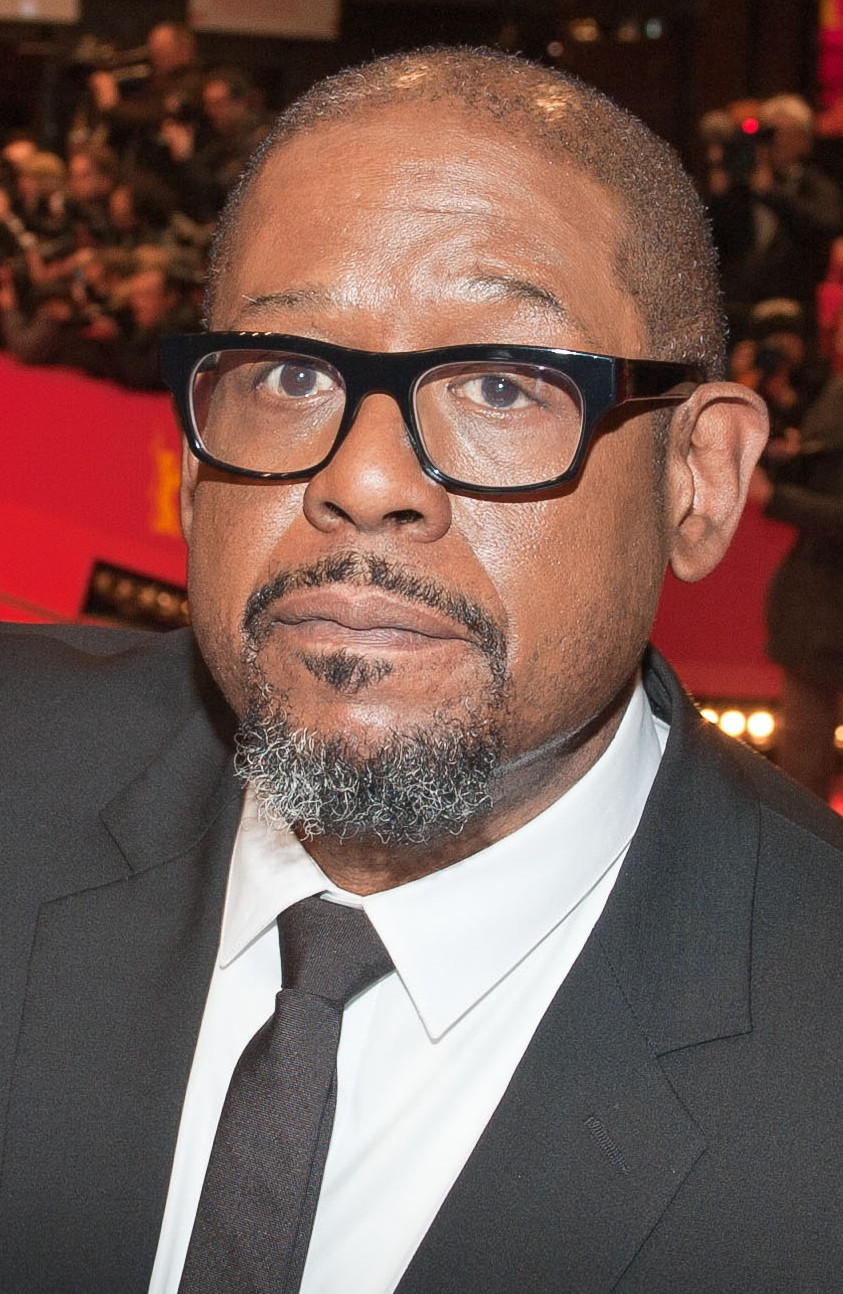
Forest Whitaker, Best Actor winner

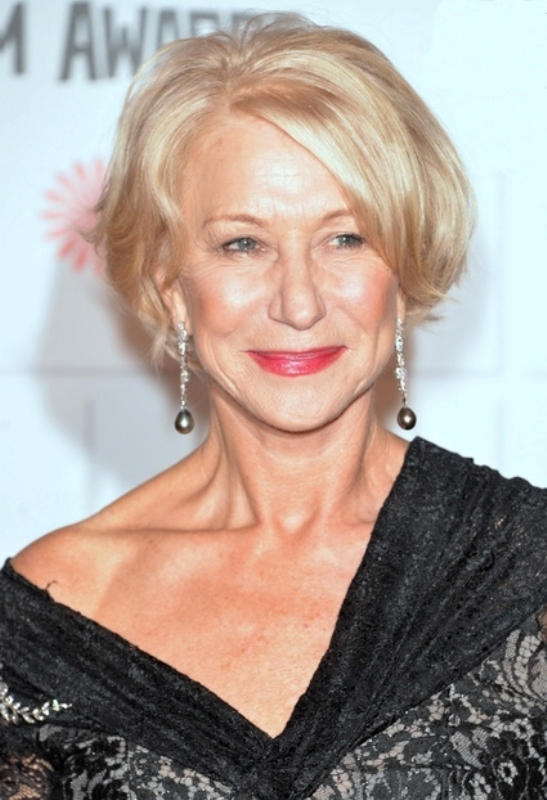
Helen Mirren, Best Actress winner

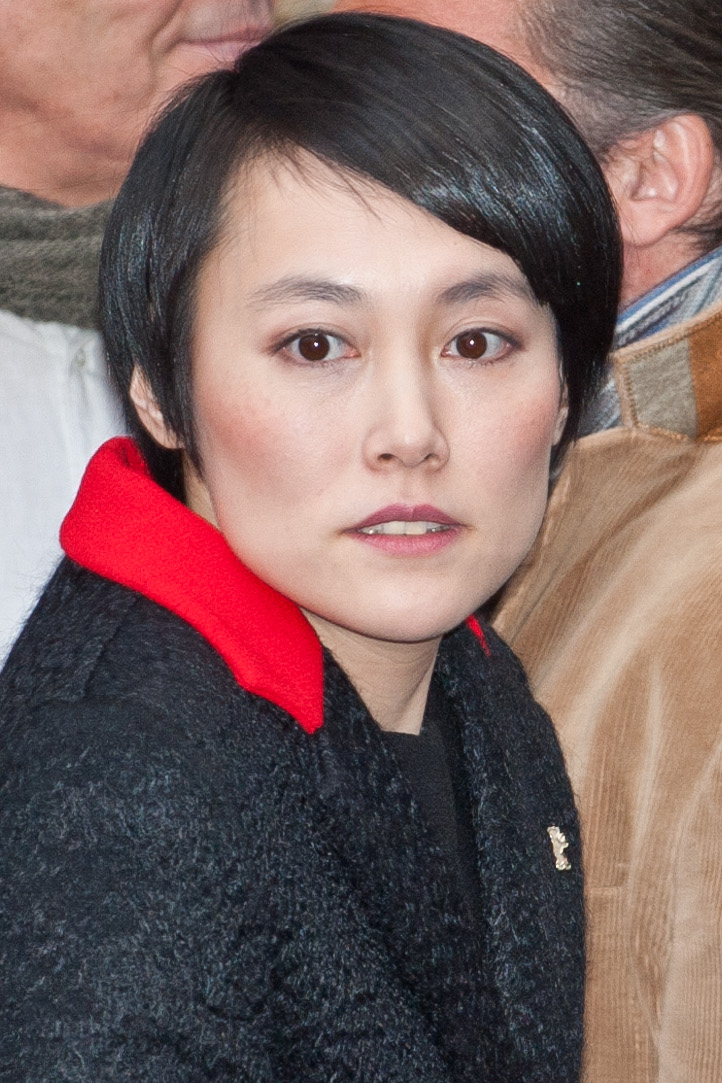
Rinko Kikuchi, Best Supporting Actress winner

=== Best Actor ===
Forest Whitaker – The Last King of Scotland

- Leonardo DiCaprio – The Departed
- Ryan Gosling – Half Nelson
- Peter O'Toole – Venus
- Will Smith – The Pursuit of Happyness

=== Best Actress ===
Helen Mirren – The Queen

- Penélope Cruz – Volver
- Judi Dench – Notes on a Scandal
- Maggie Gyllenhaal – Sherrybaby
- Meryl Streep – The Devil Wears Prada
- Kate Winslet – Little Children

=== Best Cinematography ===
Children of Men – Emmanuel Lubezki

- Babel – Rodrigo Prieto
- The Departed – Michael Ballhaus
- The Fountain – Matthew Libatique
- Letters from Iwo Jima – Tom Stern

=== Best Director ===
Martin Scorsese – The Departed

- Clint Eastwood – Letters from Iwo Jima
- Stephen Frears – The Queen
- Alejandro González Iñárritu – Babel
- Paul Greengrass – United 93

=== Best Documentary Film ===
An Inconvenient Truth

- Deliver Us from Evil
- Jesus Camp
- Shut Up & Sing
- Wordplay

=== Best Film ===
The Departed

- Babel
- Little Miss Sunshine
- The Queen
- United 93

=== Best Foreign Language Film ===
Letters from Iwo Jima, United States

- Apocalypto, United States
- Pan's Labyrinth (El laberinto del fauno), Mexico/Spain/United States
- Tsotsi, South Africa
- Volver, Spain

=== Best Original Score ===
The Fountain – Clint Mansell

- Babel – Gustavo Santaolalla
- Letters from Iwo Jima – Kyle Eastwood and Michael Stevens
- Notes on a Scandal – Philip Glass
- The Queen – Alexandre Desplat

=== Best Screenplay – Adapted ===
The Departed – William Monahan

- Little Children – Todd Field and Tom Perrotta
- Notes on a Scandal – Patrick Marber
- A Prairie Home Companion – Garrison Keillor
- Thank You for Smoking – Jason Reitman

=== Best Screenplay – Original ===
The Queen – Peter Morgan

- Babel – Guillermo Arriaga
- Letters from Iwo Jima – Iris Yamashita
- Little Miss Sunshine – Michael Arndt
- United 93 – Paul Greengrass

=== Best Supporting Actor ===
Jackie Earle Haley – Little Children

- Ben Affleck – Hollywoodland
- Eddie Murphy – Dreamgirls
- Jack Nicholson – The Departed
- Brad Pitt – Babel
- Michael Sheen – The Queen

=== Best Supporting Actress ===
Rinko Kikuchi – Babel

- Adriana Barraza – Babel
- Cate Blanchett – Notes on a Scandal
- Abigail Breslin – Little Miss Sunshine
- Toni Collette – Little Miss Sunshine
- Jennifer Hudson – Dreamgirls

=== Most Promising Performer ===
Sacha Baron Cohen – Borat: Cultural Learnings of America for Make Benefit Glorious Nation of Kazakhstan and Talladega Nights: The Ballad of Ricky Bobby

- Ivana Baquero – Pan's Labyrinth (El laberinto del fauno)
- Shareeka Epps – Half Nelson
- Rinko Kikuchi – Babel
- Keke Palmer – Akeelah and the Bee

=== Most Promising Filmmaker ===
Rian Johnson – Brick

- Jonathan Dayton and Valerie Faris – Little Miss Sunshine
- Gil Kenan – Monster House
- James McTeigue – V for Vendetta
- Jason Reitman – Thank You for Smoking
