= Iris Yamashita =

Japanese-American writer

- Born: Missouri, United States
- Education: University of California, University of Tokyo
- Occupation: Novelist
- Known for: Letters From Iwo Jima

Iris Yamashita is a Japanese American screenwriter and novelist. She was born in Missouri and studied engineering at UC Berkeley and UC San Diego as well as virtual reality at University of Tokyo while pursuing fiction writing as a hobby.

She is most well known for being hired by Clint Eastwood to write the screenplay for the companion piece to his 2006 war film Flags of Our Fathers telling the Japanese side of the story of the Battle of Iwo Jima. At first rumored to be titled Lamps Before the Wind, then called Red Sun, Black Sand, the film was released in Japan on December 9, 2006 and in the United States on December 20, 2006 as Letters from Iwo Jima. For her role as screenwriter she was nominated alongside Paul Haggis for the 2007 Academy Award for Best Original Screenplay.

Her first novel, City Under One Roof, a murder mystery set in a small town in Alaska was published on January 10, 2023. A second novel, Village in the Dark, about a detective’s search for her missing husband and son was published on February 13, 2024.

== Nominations ==
Year	Award	Category	Work	Result
2007	Academy Awards	Best Original Screenplay	Letters From Iwo Jima	Nominated
