= Dallas–Fort Worth Film Critics Association Awards 2006 =

Annual US film awards ceremony

12th Dallas-Fort Worth Film Critics Association Awards
- Date: December 19, 2006
- Location: Dallas, Texas
- Country: United States
- Presented by: Dallas-Fort Worth Film Critics Association
- Website: dfwfilmcritics.net

The 12th Dallas–Fort Worth Film Critics Association Awards, given by the Dallas-Fort Worth Film Critics Association on December 19, 2006, honored the best in film for 2006. The organization, founded in 1990, includes 35 film critics for print, radio, television, and internet publications based in north Texas.

== Top 10 films ==
1. United 93
2. The Departed (Academy Award for Best Picture)
3. Little Miss Sunshine
4. The Queen
5. Babel
6. Letters from Iwo Jima
7. Dreamgirls
8. Blood Diamond
9. Little Children
10. Flags of Our Fathers

== Winners ==
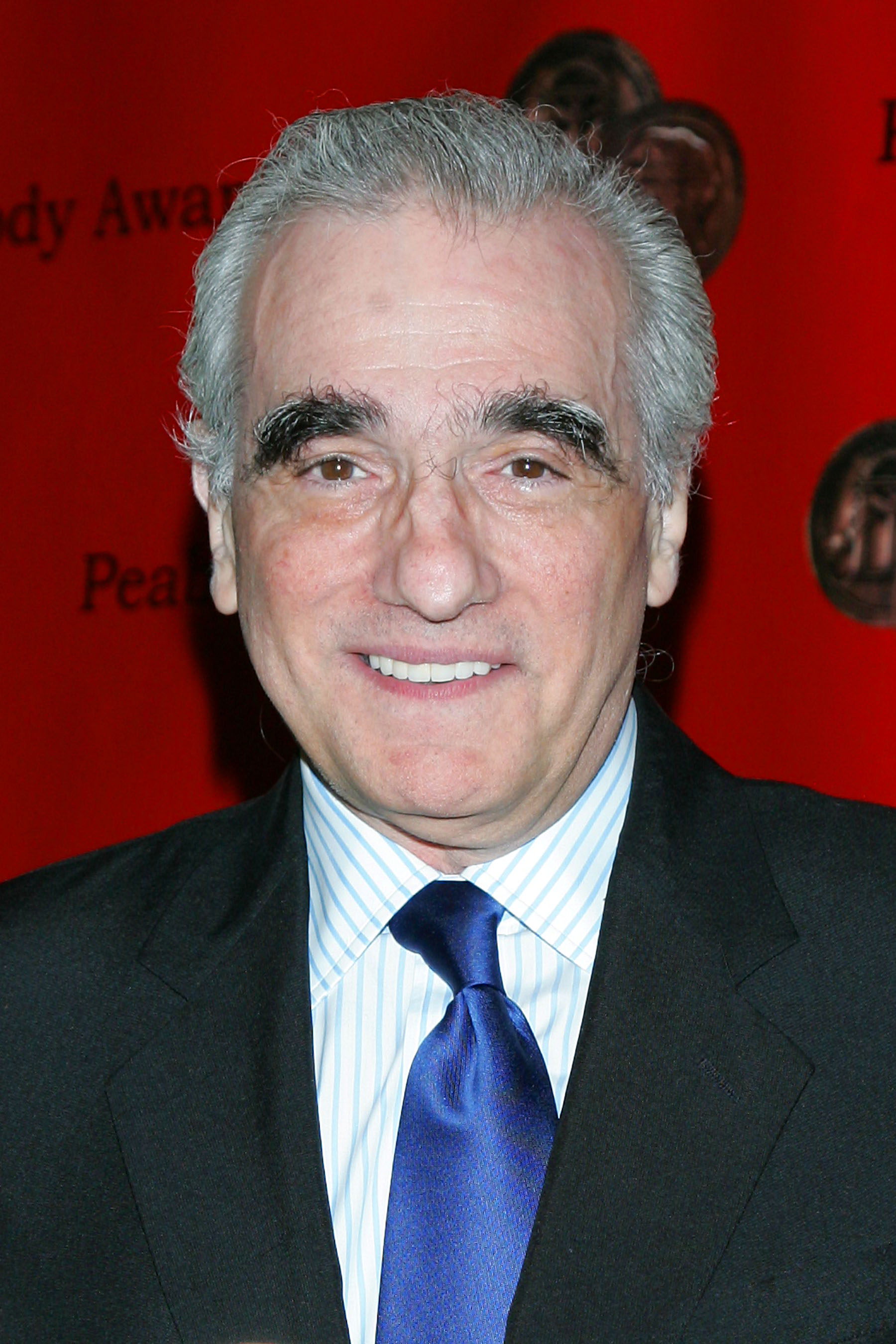
Martin Scorsese, Best Director winner

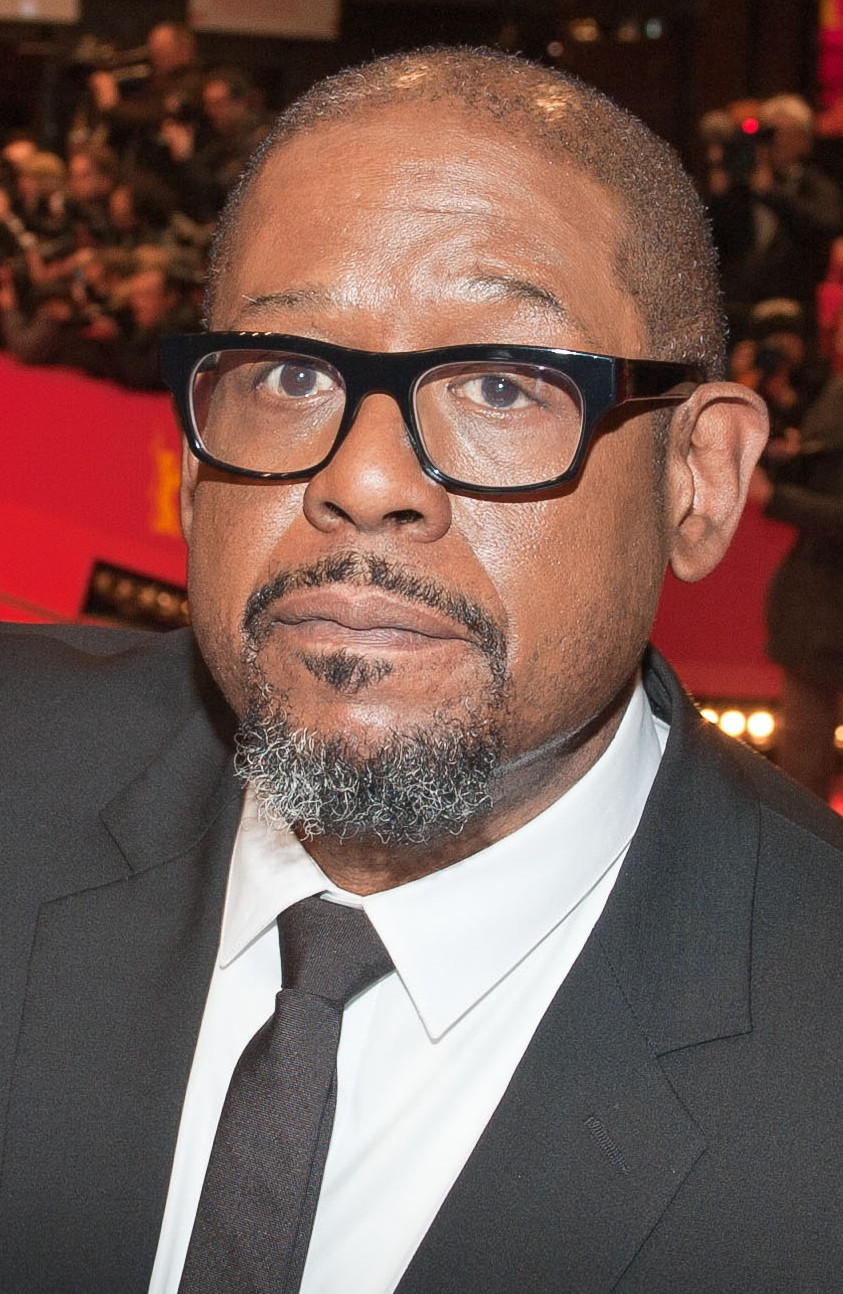
Forest Whitaker, Best Actor winner

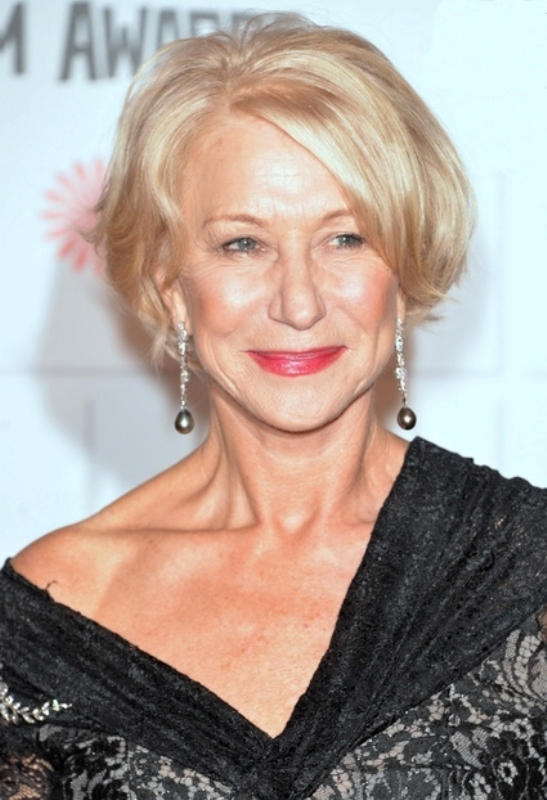
Helen Mirren, Best Actress winner

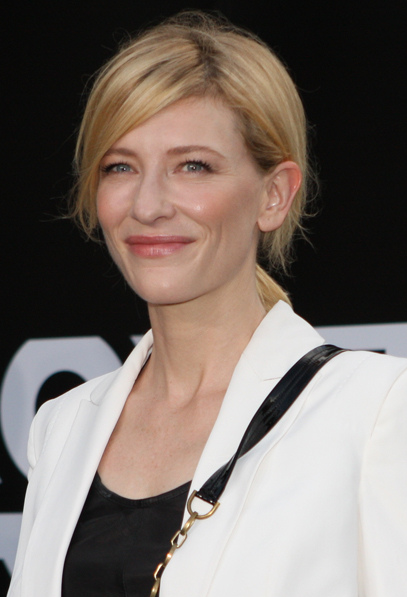
Cate Blanchett, Best Supporting Actress winner

- Best Actor:
  - Forest Whitaker – The Last King of Scotland
- Best Actress:
  - Helen Mirren – The Queen
- Best Animated Film:
  - Happy Feet
- Best Cinematography:
  - Apocalypto – Dean Semler
- Best Director:
  - Martin Scorsese – The Departed
- Best Documentary Film:
  - An Inconvenient Truth
- Best Film:
  - United 93
- Best Foreign Language Film:
  - Letters from Iwo Jima, United States/Japan
- Best Supporting Actor:
  - Jackie Earle Haley – Little Children
- Best Supporting Actress:
  - Cate Blanchett – Notes on a Scandal
