= Richard Pearson (film editor) =

American film editor

- Born: 1961 (age 63–64); Minneapolis, Minnesota, United States
- Occupation: Film editor

Richard Pearson (born 1961) is an American film editor who is mainly associated with action films. Pearson, with Clare Douglas and Christopher Rouse, received the BAFTA Award for Best Editing for the film United 93 (2006).

== Life and career ==
Pearson was born in Minneapolis, Minnesota, and raised in New Hope, Minnesota. As a college student in the early 1980s, Pearson was an intern at the television station WCCO-TV in Minneapolis. He moved to Hollywood in 1985 to pursue a career in the entertainment industry. His first editing credit was for the television miniseries From the Earth to the Moon (1998). The "1968" episode of From the Earth to the Moon was nominated for an American Cinema Editors "Eddie" award (Best Edited Episode from a Television Mini-Series) and for an Emmy Award (Outstanding Single Camera Picture Editing for a Miniseries or a Movie). Christopher Rouse, Pearson's co-editor on The Bourne Supremacy and United 93, also worked on this miniseries.

Following an editing credit for the film Muppets from Space (1999), Pearson edited two films (Bowfinger and The Score) that were directed by Frank Oz, who was Jim Henson's early collaborator in developing The Muppets.

United 93 was directed by Paul Greengrass, who is particularly noted for films that are "shot verité style as a detailed mass of hectic vignettes—jagged jump cuts, sudden blackouts, overlapping everything." The use of three editors (Douglas, Pearson, and Rouse) on United 93 was dictated by its short post-production period; less than six months passed between the start of filming and release of the film. Greengrass and Douglas had worked together quite successfully on the film Bloody Sunday (2002); Greengrass, Pearson, and Rouse had recently finished The Bourne Supremacy (2004). Despite the accelerated post-production schedule for United 93, the editing was very successful. Ellen Feldman has written an analysis of the film's editing; she notes that, "United 93 represents a complex editing feat, with a structure based on parallel cutting combined with an edgy, hyper-cranked "Cinema Verité” style, a style that disorients us but doesn't prevent us from grasping lots of necessary exposition and identifying with many characters." In addition to the BAFTA Award, the editors were also nominated for an Academy Award for Film Editing and for an ACE Eddie Award.

Pearson has been elected to membership in the American Cinema Editors.

Pearson was an editor of the James Bond film, Quantum of Solace (2008), along with Matt Chessé. He worked on Safe House (2012). He resides in California.

== Editing credits ==
Editor
Year	Film	Director	Notes
1999	Muppets from Space	Tim Hill	
1999	Bowfinger	Frank Oz	First collaboration with Frank Oz
2000	Drowning Mona	Nick Gomez	
2001	Scary Movie 2	Keenen Ivory Wayans	
2001	The Score	Frank Oz	Second collaboration with Frank Oz
2002	Men in Black II	Barry Sonnenfeld	
2003	The Rundown	Peter Berg	
2004	The Bourne Supremacy	Paul Greengrass	First collaboration with Paul Greengrass
2005	A Little Trip to Heaven	Baltasar Kormákur	
2005	Rent	Chris Columbus	
2006	United 93	Paul Greengrass	Second collaboration with Paul Greengrass
2007	Blades of Glory	Josh Gordon; Will Speck	First collaboration with Josh Gordon and Will Speck
2008	Get Smart	Peter Segal	
2008	Quantum of Solace	Marc Forster	
2010	Iron Man 2	Jon Favreau	
2012	Safe House	Daniel Espinosa	
2012	Red Dawn	Dan Bradley	
2014	Maleficent	Robert Stromberg	
2014	Dracula Untold	Gary Shore	
2016	The Accountant	Gavin O'Connor	First collaboration with Gavin O'Connor
2017	Kong: Skull Island	Jordan Vogt-Roberts	
2017	Justice League	Zack Snyder	
2019	Godzilla: King of the Monsters	Michael Dougherty	
2020	Wonder Woman 1984	Patty Jenkins	
2022	Uncharted	Ruben Fleischer	
2022	Lyle, Lyle, Crocodile	Josh Gordon; Will Speck	Second collaboration with Josh Gordon and Will Speck
2025	The Accountant 2	Gavin O'Connor	Second collaboration with Gavin O'Connor

Editorial department
Year	Film	Director	Role
2000	Bait	Antoine Fuqua	Additional editor
2021	Godzilla vs. Kong	Adam Wingard	Additional editor
2024	Lift	F. Gary Gray	Additional editor

Actor
Year	Film	Director	Role	Notes
2002	Men in Black II	Barry Sonnenfeld	Gordy	Voice role

TV series

Editor
Year	Title	Notes
1993	South Beach	1 episode
1994−97	New York Undercover	22 episodes
1998	From the Earth to the Moon	4 episodes
2013	The Power Inside	3 episodes

Editorial department
Year	Title	Role	Notes
1990	American Chronicles	Assistant editor; On-line editor	6 episodes

Additional crew
Year	Title	Role	Notes
1998	From the Earth to the Moon	Title designer: Main titles	12 episodes
2015	Blood and Gold: The Making of Spain with Simon Sebag Montefiore	Production assistant	1 episode
