= Clare Douglas =

English film editor (1944–2017)

- Undated photograph of Ms. Douglas
- Born: Elizabeth Clare Douglas; 21 February 1944; Ipswich, England
- Died: 9 July 2017 (aged 73); France
- Occupation: Film Editor
- Spouse: Michael Barnes (1992–2017)

Elizabeth Clare Douglas (21 February 1944 – 9 July 2017) was an English film editor who received a BAFTA Award for Best Editing for the 2006 film United 93. Douglas worked extensively for British television, and had been nominated four times for BAFTA Television Editing Awards.

== Biography ==
Following a degree in English and drama at Bristol University, Douglas entered a film program at Hornsey College of Art. She was a trainee at the BBC and worked as an editor there on a range of documentaries and dramas. Her freelance career began when Dennis Potter asked her to leave and edit for his company.

== Bloody Sunday ==
Douglas was nominated for a BAFTA Television Craft Award for the editing of Bloody Sunday (2002), which was directed by Paul Greengrass. Bloody Sunday was honored by the Golden Bear award as best film at the Berlin International Film Festival. The editing of Bloody Sunday was noted in J. Hoberman's review of the film:

...cuts back and forth between the spirited Irish Catholics preparing to march through their republican neighborhood and the grim, gray-faced British command making plans to stop them. The nominal protagonist is Protestant MP and pacifist civil rights leader Ivan Cooper (James Nesbitt), who cheerfully orchestrates the march and then is overwhelmed by the unfolding catastrophe. All characters are encountered on the run. The movie is shot verité style as a detailed mass of hectic vignettes—jagged jump cuts, sudden blackouts, overlapping everything. The "you are there" faux combat photography, a sequence that runs nearly three-quarters of an hour, is as remarkable in its staging as Black Hawk Down's, except that Bloody Sunday was shot largely on 16mm, Greengrass is frequently closer to the action, and here, for the most part, the victims are unarmed civilians.

The editing of Black Hawk Down (2001) had just won Pietro Scalia an Academy Award when Hoberman was writing his review. In a similar vein, Tor Thorsen wrote:

Using innovative editing and ultra-verité camerawork, Greengrass also ratchets up the tension to almost unbearable levels. Few films have captured the chaos of an urban conflagration with such fury, and audience members will leave feeling as shaken as Nesbitt's Cooper looks when the bullets stop flying. With his hangdog features looking more sullen than should be humanly possible, he prophetically tells reporters that, "The British army couldn't have handed the IRA a bigger victory than they did here today." Sadly, the next 25 years of bloodshed proved him right.

== United 93 ==
United 93 was directed by Paul Greengrass, and was edited by Douglas, Christopher Rouse, and Richard Pearson. The use of three editors for the film was dictated by its short production period, which was less than six months between the start of filming and release of the film. Greengrass and Douglas had worked together quite successfully on the film Bloody Sunday (2002); Greengrass, Rouse, and Pearson had just edited The Bourne Supremacy (2004). Despite the accelerated production schedule for United 93, the editing was very successful. In addition to the BAFTA award, the editors were also nominated for an Academy Award for Film Editing and for an ACE Eddie award. Ellen Feldman wrote an analysis of the film's editing.

== The Lost Prince and the le Carré Miniseries ==
Douglas' later BAFTA television nomination was for editing The Lost Prince (2003), which was written and directed by Stephen Poliakoff; The Lost Prince won a Primetime Emmy Award for Outstanding Miniseries.

Much earlier, Douglas had been nominated twice as best editor for two miniseries based on John le Carré's espionage novels Tinker, Tailor, Soldier, Spy (directed by John Irvin-1979) and Smiley's People (1982), which was directed by Simon Langton. Douglas also edited a third miniseries based on le Carré's novel A Perfect Spy (1987). Douglas died on 9 July 2017, aged 73.

== Selected filmography ==
Director indicated in parentheses.

- Capturing Mary (Stephen Poliakoff-2007)
- Joe's Palace (Stephen Poliakoff-2007)
- United 93 (Paul Greengrass-2006)
- Gideon's Daughter (Stephen Poliakoff-2005)
- Friends and Crocodiles (Stephen Poliakoff-2005)
- A Way of Life (Amma Asante-2004)
- The Lost Prince (Stephen Poliakoff-2003)
- Bloody Sunday (Paul Greengrass-2002)
- The Murder of Stephen Lawrence (Paul Greengrass-1999)
- The Misadventures of Margaret (Brian Skeet-1998)
- Karaoke (Renny Rye-1996)
- Cold Lazarus (Renny Rye-1996)
- Midnight Movie (Renny Rye-1994)
- Lipstick on Your Collar (Renny Rye-1993)
- Secret Friends (Dennis Potter-1991)
- Blackeyes (Dennis Potter-1989)
- A Perfect Spy (Peter Smith - 1987)
- The McGuffin (Colin Bucksey - 1986)
- The Aerodrome (Giles Foster - 1983)
- Smiley's People (Simon Langton - 1982)
- Tinker, Tailor, Soldier, Spy (John Irvin - 1979)
- Emma (John Glenister - 1972)
