= Christopher Rouse (film editor) =

American film editor

- Born: Christopher Russell Rouse; November 28, 1958 (age 67); Los Angeles, California
- Occupations: film and television editor, screenwriter

Christopher Russell Rouse (born November 28, 1958) is an American film and television editor and screenwriter who has about a dozen feature-film credits and numerous television credits. Rouse won the Academy Award for Best Film Editing, the BAFTA Award for Best Editing, and the ACE Eddie Award for the film The Bourne Ultimatum (2007).

== Life and career ==
Rouse was born in Los Angeles, California. His father, Russell Rouse, was a writer, director and producer. His mother was actress Beverly Michaels.

In the 1980s, he worked as an assistant editor on numerous films, commencing with All Summer in a Day (1982). His first editing credit was for Desperate Hours (1990), which was directed by Michael Cimino. Much of Rouse's work in the 1990s was in television. He edited the mini-series Anne Frank: The Whole Story (2002) for which he was nominated for an Emmy Award.

Rouse has worked on six films with director Paul Greengrass. The Bourne Supremacy (2004) was their first collaboration. Rouse had previously been an "additional editor" on the initial film in the Bourne series, The Bourne Identity (2002), that had been directed by Doug Liman. Frank Marshall, who co-produced the Bourne series, recommended Rouse to Greengrass.

The editing of their second feature together, United 93 (2006), received the BAFTA Award as well as nominations for the Academy Award and the ACE Eddie Award. Rouse won the Academy Award, the BAFTA Award, and the ACE Eddie for his third collaboration The Bourne Ultimatum (2007). He edited Greengrass' 2010 film Green Zone.

Several interviews of Rouse have been published where he discusses the editing of Greengrass's films. Greengrass is noted for a "cinéma vérité" style of filmmaking that uses several handheld cameras, and that creates opportunities for innovative editing. Ellen Feldman has written a detailed analysis of the editing of United 93. David Bordwell has discussed this aspect of the films as a further extension of "intensified continuity", which is a perspective on filmmaking that Bordwell has been developing for some years.

Rouse has been elected as a member of the American Cinema Editors.

== Filmography ==
Editor
Year	Film	Director	Notes
1990	Desperate Hours	Michael Cimino	
1991	Past Midnight	Jan Eliasberg	
1994	Dangerous Touch	Lou Diamond Phillips	First collaboration with Lou Diamond Phillips
1994	Teresa's Tattoo	Julie Cypher	
1995	Nothing Personal	Thaddeus O'Sullivan	
1997	Dead Men Can't Dance	Stephen Milburn Anderson; Hubert de La Bouillerie	
2003	The Italian Job	F. Gary Gray	First collaboration with F. Gary Gray
2003	Paycheck	John Woo	
2004	The Bourne Supremacy	Paul Greengrass	First collaboration with Paul Greengrass
2006	Eight Below	Frank Marshall	
2006	United 93	Paul Greengrass	Second collaboration with Paul Greengrass
2007	The Bourne Ultimatum	Paul Greengrass	Third collaboration with Paul Greengrass
2010	Green Zone	Paul Greengrass	Fourth collaboration with Paul Greengrass
2013	Captain Phillips	Paul Greengrass	Fifth collaboration with Paul Greengrass
2016	Jason Bourne	Paul Greengrass	Sixth collaboration with Paul Greengrass
2019	Hobbs & Shaw	David Leitch	
2024	IF	John Krasinski	Second collaboration with John Krasinski
2026	Animals	Ben Affleck	Second collaboration with Ben Affleck

Editorial department
Year	Film	Director	Role	Notes
1979	A Force of One	Paul Aaron	Apprentice editor	
1982	Lookin' to Get Out	Hal Ashby	Assistant editor	
1984	Windy City	Armyan Bernstein	Additional film editor	
1986	The Golden Child	Michael Ritchie	Assistant film editor	
1988	Above the Law	Andrew Davis	Assistant editor	
1988	Shag	Zelda Barron	Location assistant editor	
1989	She's Out of Control	Stan Dragoti	First assistant editor	
1990	Desperate Hours	Michael Cimino	Assistant editor	
1994	Sioux City	Lou Diamond Phillips	Supervising editor	Second collaboration with Lou Diamond Phillips
1997	Hacks	Gary Rosen	Editorial consultant	
2002	Manito	Eric Eason	Additional editor	
2002	The Bourne Identity	Doug Liman	Additional editor	
2005	Be Cool	F. Gary Gray	Additional editor	Second collaboration with F. Gary Gray
2010	The Town	Ben Affleck	Additional editor	First collaboration with Ben Affleck
2011	Green Lantern	Martin Campbell	Additional editor	
2018	Solo: A Star Wars Story	Ron Howard	Additional editor	
2020	A Quiet Place Part II	John Krasinski	Additional editor	First collaboration with John Krasinski

Producer
Year	Film	Director	Credit
2010	Green Zone	Paul Greengrass	Co-producer
2013	Captain Phillips	Paul Greengrass	Co-producer
2016	Jason Bourne	Paul Greengrass	Executive producer

Thanks
Year	Film	Director	Role
2010	Burlesque	Steve Antin	Special thanks
2012	Safe House	Daniel Espinosa	Special thanks
2014	Kill the Messenger	Michael Cuesta	Special thanks
2018	Bird Box	Susanne Bier	Special thanks
2021	Dune	Denis Villeneuve	Denis Villeneuve wishes to thank
2024	Heretic	Scott Beck; Bryan Woods	Special thanks

Writer
Year	Film	Director
2016	Jason Bourne	Paul Greengrass

Documentaries

Editor
Year	Film	Director
1999	Olympic Glory	Kieth Merrill

Producer
Year	Film	Director	Credit
2022	Jennifer Lopez: Halftime	Amanda Micheli	Executive producer

Thanks
Year	Film	Director	Role
2023	Kiss the Future	Nenad Cicin-Sain	Special thanks

TV movies

Editor
Year	Film	Director
1994	Breach of Conduct	Tim Matheson
1995	The Wharf Rat	Jimmy Huston
1995	Tails You Live, Heads You're Dead	Tim Matheson
1999	Aftershock: Earthquake in New York	Mikael Salomon
2000	Sole Survivor	Mikael Salomon
2001	A Girl Thing	Lee Rose
2001	Anne Frank: The Whole Story	Robert Dornhelm
2002	The Pennsylvania Miners' Story	David Frankel

Actor
Year	Film	Director	Role
1994	Madonna: Innocence Lost	Bradford May	Doo-wop Singer
2001	Ruby's Bucket of Blood	Peter Werner	Sugar Kings

TV series

Editor
Year	Title	Notes
1998	From the Earth to the Moon	4 episodes
1999	Aftershock: Earthquake in New York	2 episodes
2001	A Girl Thing	4 episodes
2001	Anne Frank: The Whole Story	2 episodes
2002	Boomtown	2 episodes

Music department
Year	Title	Role	Notes
2003	The Saddle Club	Composer: Additional song Performer: Additional song	1 episode

TV shorts

Editorial department
Year	Film	Director	Role
1982	All Summer in a Day	Ed Kaplan	Assistant editor

== Awards and nominations ==
- 2008
  - Won: Academy Award for Best Film Editing - The Bourne Ultimatum
  - Won: BAFTA Film Awards Best Edited Feature Film - The Bourne Ultimatum
  - Won: ACE Eddie Best Edited Film - Drama - The Bourne Ultimatum
- 2007
  - Nominated: Academy Award for Film Editing - United 93
  - Won: BAFTA Award for Best Editing - United 93
  - Nominated: ACE Eddie Best Edited Film - Drama - United 93
  - Won: Online Film Critics Society Award for Best Editing - United 93
- 2006
  - Won: San Diego Film Critics Society Award for Best Editing - United 93
- 2001
  - Nominated: Emmy Award - Anne Frank: The Whole Story

== See also ==
- List of film director and editor collaborations
