= United 93 (film) =

2006 film by Paul Greengrass

- Theatrical release poster
- Directed by: Paul Greengrass
- Written by: Paul Greengrass
- Produced by: Tim Bevan; Eric Fellner; Lloyd Levin; Paul Greengrass
- Starring: See below
- Cinematography: Barry Ackroyd
- Edited by: Clare Douglas; Christopher Rouse; Richard Pearson
- Music by: John Powell
- Production companies: Working Title Films; Sidney Kimmel Entertainment
- Distributed by: Universal Pictures (North America); United International Pictures (International)
- Release dates: 25 April 2006 (Tribeca); 28 April 2006 (United States)
- Running time: 111 minutes
- Countries: United Kingdom; United States
- Languages: English; Arabic (diegetic)
- Budget: $15–18 million
- Box office: $77.6 million

United 93 is a 2006 docudrama action film produced, written, and directed by Paul Greengrass, that depicts the events around United Airlines Flight 93, one of four hijacked flights of the September 11 attacks. Flight 93 was the only plane not to hit a target when its passengers began an uprising. The film also covers the experiences of government officials and air traffic controllers as they witness the attacks unfold.

The film recounts the hijacking and subsequent events during the flight using a real time perspective, where the film takes place over the same amount of time as the real-life events, beginning from takeoff. There is, however, a disclaimer that some imagination was used to tell the story. United 93 was made with the support and cooperation of many passengers' families, who attended the premiere, although there were a few who did not participate in any of the film's activities. Some of the on-the-ground personnel, most notably Federal Aviation Administration head Ben Sliney, portray themselves.

United 93 premiered on April 25, 2006, at the Tribeca Film Festival in New York City, and later opened in theaters nationwide in America on April 28, 2006. The film was a box-office success, grossing $78 million worldwide. Ten percent of the gross income from the three-day opening weekend was promised as a donation to create a memorial for the flight's victims.

The film is often listed as one of best films of the 2000s and received accolades including two BAFTAS, an Empire Award and prizes at multiple international film festivals in addition to two Academy Award nominations: Best Director for Greengrass and Best Film Editing for Clare Douglas, Richard Pearson, and Christopher Rouse.

== Plot ==
At a Newark hotel the morning of September 11, 2001, al-Qaeda members Ziad Jarrah, Saeed al-Ghamdi, Ahmed al-Nami, and Ahmed al-Haznawi pray before boarding United Airlines Flight 93. Among the passengers are Tom Burnett, Todd Beamer, Jeremy Glick, Lauren Grandcolas, Louise Nacke, Richard Guadagno and Alan Beaven. Narrowly missing the final boarding call, Mark Bingham rushes to become the last passenger to board. Meanwhile, air traffic controllers (ATC) lose contact with American Airlines Flight 11 which diverts toward New York City (NYC) while United 93 is delayed. ATCs realize Flight 11 has been hijacked after hearing Mohamed Atta transmitting. Shortly after United 93 takes off, Flight 11 crashes into the World Trade Center's North Tower and United Airlines Flight 175, also hijacked, crashes into the South Tower.

As United 93 reaches its cruising altitude, Jarrah hesitates to give the sign. An ACARS message warns of the WTC attacks and potential cockpit intrusion. After Nami unsuccessfully urges Jarrah to attack, an impatient Haznawi prepares a fake bomb in the lavatory. Ghamdi grabs flight attendant Deborah Welsh at knifepoint as passenger Mark Rothenberg is stabbed by Haznawi. As Haznawi and Nami force the passengers to the back of the plane, Ghamdi fatally stabs pilots Jason Dahl and LeRoy Homer, but not before they transmit a mayday call. As Jarrah stabilizes and pilots the plane, Ghamdi slits Welsh's throat. The hijackers celebrate news of the WTC attack and Jarrah redirects the plane towards Washington, D.C., intending to crash into the United States Capitol. Grandcolas (an emergency medical technician) tends to the dying Rothenberg before being angrily sent back by Nami. Attendants Sandra Bradshaw and CeeCee Lyles find that Rothenberg has died as Bradshaw witnesses the hijackers moving the pilots' bodies. The passengers overhear the attendants discuss the pilots' deaths and realize that it is not a routine hijacking.

American Airlines Flight 77, also hijacked, crashes into the Pentagon. Federal Aviation Administration National Operations Manager Ben Sliney decides to shut down all U.S. air space and grounds all flights. On United 93, passengers learn of the terrorist attacks from family members via airphone. Realizing the hijackers are on a suicide mission with no intention of landing, Burnett gathers the male able bodied passengers to the plane's tail to form a plan to retake the plane with assistance from the flight crew. They start gathering weapons just as they learn from Beaven that passenger Donald Greene is a licensed pilot and that passenger Andrew Garcia is a former ATC. The four hijackers anxiously realize that they are losing control of the situation, just as passenger Edward Felt retreats to the rear lavatory and dials 911. Attempting to counsel appeasement, passenger Christian Adams is restrained by passenger Toshiya Kuge. The passengers start to pray, comfort each other and make final calls to loved ones.

Beamer states, "Let's roll", and the passengers charge Haznawi and subdue him. Nami alerts Jarrah and Ghamdi to the counter attack; Bingham kills Haznawi by bludgeoning his head with a fire extinguisher and Nacke declares the bomb a fake. Jarrah rocks the plane to disrupt the revolt as Nami tries to keep the passengers at bay with a serving cart, pepper spray, knife and a fire extinguisher but the passengers persist and overpower him: Glick (a national judo champion) kills Nami by grabbing him in a chokehold and snapping his neck. The male able bodied passengers converge at the cockpit door while Grandcolas, Beaven, William Cashman, Patrick Driscoll, Bradshaw and Lyles struggle to get Greene and Garcia through first class; Jarrah and Ghamdi are disheartened by the realization they will not reach their target as the passengers batter the cockpit door with the cart and debate crashing the plane rather than ceding control; Ghamdi holds an axe to the peephole but the door weakens, and Jarrah puts the aircraft into a steep dive. Burnett, Bingham, Beamer and Guadagno breach the cockpit and wrestle the remaining two hijackers over the controls; Guadango, Beamer and Bingham grasp Ghamdi for the left yoke as Burnett and Jarrah’s hands are grabbing the right yoke. United 93 inverts and crashes into a Pennsylvania field, killing all still alive aboard.

Title cards state that authorities were only given the order to shoot down hijacked planes after United 93 had crashed. The final card reads, "Dedicated to the memory of all those who lost their lives on September 11, 2001".

== Cast ==
=== Crew ===
- J. J. Johnson as Captain Jason Dahl
- Gary Commock as First Officer LeRoy Homer Jr.
- Polly Adams as Deborah Welsh
- Trish Gates as Sandra Bradshaw
- Opal Alladin as CeeCee Lyles
- Nancy McDoniel as Lorraine G. Bay
- Starla Benford as Wanda Anita Green

=== Passengers ===
- Christian Clemenson as Tom Burnett
- Cheyenne Jackson as Mark Bingham
- David Alan Basche as Todd Beamer
- Peter Hermann as Jeremy Glick
- Corey Johnson as Louis J. Nacke, II
- Daniel Sauli as Richard Guadagno
- Richard Bekins as William Joseph Cashman
- Michael J. Reynolds as Patrick Joseph Driscoll
- Peter Marinker as Andrew Garcia
- David Rasche as Donald Freeman Greene
- Chip Zien as Mark Rothenberg
- Erich Redman as Christian Adams
- Kate Jennings Grant as Lauren Grandcolas
- Simon Poland as Alan Anthony Beaven
- Trieste Kelly Dunn as Deora Frances Bodley
- Jodie Lynne McClintock as Marion R. Britton
- Marceline Hugot as Georgine Rose Corrigan
- Rebecca Schull as Patricia Cushing
- Ray Charleson as Joseph DeLuca
- Tom O'Rourke as Donald Peterson
- Becky London as Jean Headley Peterson
- John Rothman as Edward P. Felt
- Libby Morris as Hilda Marcin
- Denny Dillon as Colleen Fraser
- Susan Blommaert as Jane Folger
- Tara Hugo as Kristin White Gould
- Lorna Dallas as Linda Gronlund
- Masato Kamo as Toshiya Kuge (久下 季哉)
- Liza Colón-Zayas as Waleska Martinez
- Olivia Thirlby as Nicole Carol Miller
- Leigh Zimmerman as Christine Snyder
- Joe Jamrog as John Talignani
- Chloe Sirene as Honor Elizabeth Wainio

=== Hijackers ===
- Khalid Abdalla as Ziad Jarrah
- Lewis Alsamari as Saeed al-Ghamdi
- Jamie Harding as Ahmed al-Nami
- Omar Berdouni as Ahmed al-Haznawi

=== Herndon, Virginia ===
- Ben Sliney as himself
- Rich Sullivan as himself
- Tony Smith as himself
- Tobin Miller as himself
- Michael Bofshever as John White

=== Eastern Air Defense Sector, (NEADS), Rome, New York ===
- Patrick St. Esprit as Major Kevin Nasypany
- Gregg Henry as Colonel Robert Marr
- Karen Kirkpatrick as Major Dawne Deskins
- Major James Fox as himself
- Staff Sergeant Shawna Fox as herself
- First Lieutenant Jeremy Powell as himself

=== Ronkonkoma, New York ===
- Peter Pellicane as Paul Thumser
- John E. Smith as Dave Bottiglia
- Curt Applegate as himself

=== Boston, Massachusetts ===
- Scott Tourin as Peter Zalewski
- Thomas Roberts as himself
- John Moraitis as John Reilly

=== Cleveland, Ohio ===
- Daniel Fraser as John Werth
- Morgan Deare as Tom Cloud

=== Newark, New Jersey ===
- Greg Callahan as himself
- Rick Tepper as himself

== Production ==
The film was the first Hollywood feature to draw its narrative directly from the September 11 attacks of 2001. Passengers were portrayed in the film mostly by professional but relatively unknown actors. (Tom Burnett, for instance, is played by Christian Clemenson, who has since appeared on Boston Legal and CSI: Miami). Additionally, several participants in the real-life events portray themselves in the film, including Thomas Roberts, Tobin Miller, Rich Sullivan, Tony Smith, James Fox, Shawna Fox, Jeremy Powell, Curt Applegate, Greg Callahan, Rick Tepper, and notably FAA operations manager Ben Sliney. Sliney was initially involved in the film in an advisory role. He was then cast in a small role as an air traffic controller. Later, Greengrass offered him the opportunity to play himself, which he accepted. The roles of one of the flight attendants, the two pilots, and many other airline personnel were filled by actual airline employees.

During production, the actors playing the crew and the passengers were put in separate hotels from the actors portraying the hijackers, and ate their meals separately, ostensibly to create an air of antagonism between the two groups. The set itself was built so that it moved in the way the actual flight did. During filming, many of the actors got injured, and the blood visible on their faces during the revolt scene is authentic. Finishing the first take, Jamie Harding, who played al-Nami, became overwhelmed and was sobbing.

Filming took place from October until December 2005, on a 20-year-old reclaimed Boeing 757 formerly operated by MyTravel Airways, at Pinewood Studios in the UK near London. The cockpit was built by Flightdeck Solutions. The location was chosen both for its financial incentives and to shield actors from unwanted scrutiny that they might have received in the United States. Action was filmed with handheld cameras, chosen for their versatility on the close-quarters sets and to create a sense of immediacy. Exterior airport sequences were shot on location at Newark Liberty International Airport, while interiors were shot in England at London Stansted Airport. Some scenes were also shot in Washington, D.C. and Boston. Additionally, an opening sequence set in Afghanistan was shot in Morocco, but it was cut from the film before release.

== Release ==
The film was released in the United States on April 28, 2006, and opened second in the weekend box office behind RV, but it netted a slightly higher per-screen average.

The first trailer used the title Flight 93. United Airlines had no involvement with its production, and did not consent to its content. When Universal Studios deemed the intended title legally sound, it was changed in March 2006, and the final trailer used the title United 93.

There were calls for Universal to pull the trailers from circulation in cinemas, due to some audience members feeling startled or upset by the subject matter. The studio ignored that call, although one theatre in Manhattan voluntarily pulled the trailer after complaints.

Initial screenings ended with the closing credits line "America's War on Terror had begun". This was replaced in the release version with "Dedicated to the memory of all those who lost their lives on September 11, 2001".

The Iraqi-born, London-based actor Lewis Alsamari, who plays Ghamdi, was reportedly denied a visa by United States immigration authorities when he applied to visit New York to attend the premiere, despite having already been granted asylum in the United Kingdom during the 1990s. The reason given was that he had once been a conscripted member of the Iraqi Army — although this was also the grounds for his refugee status after his desertion in 1993. Other sources say that he applied late for his visa and that it was not denied.

== Historical accuracy ==
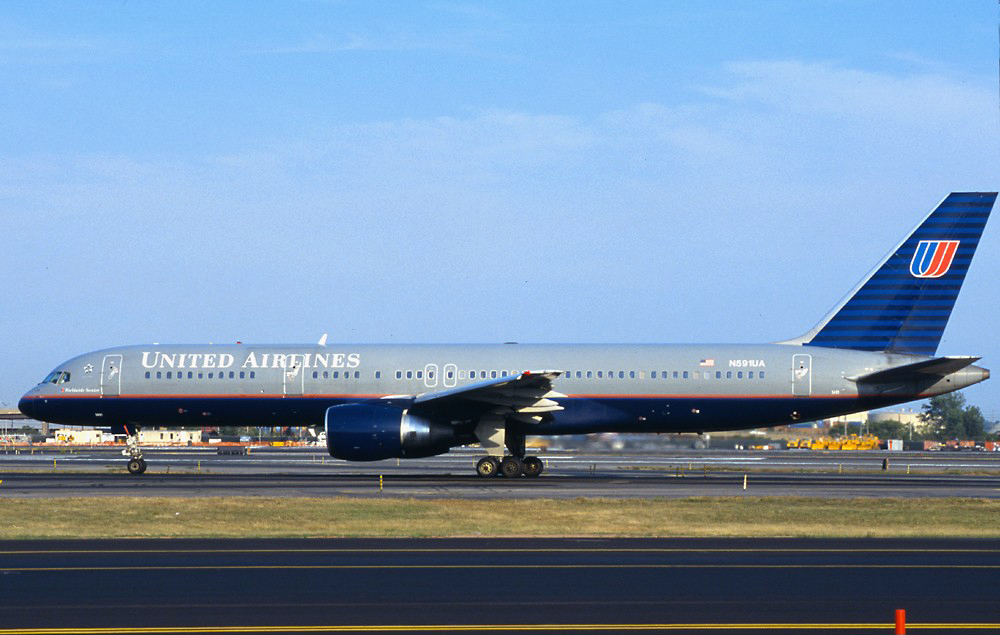
Of the four aircraft hijacked on September 11, United Airlines Flight 93 was the only aircraft that did not reach its hijackers' intended target.

The timing of the events is changed for dramatic effect, with Jarrah making his final call to his girlfriend from the airport lounge, whereas he made it from his hotel room, and Mohamed Atta's “we have some planes” transmission being determined before Flight 11 crashed into the WTC, whereas it actually happened afterwards. In an interview, Ben Sliney said that Greengrass exaggerated other details for dramatic effect, such as he and various controllers swearing and shouting when in his recollection most people spoke quietly.

The film suggests that hesitation on the part of Jarrah caused the hijacking to take place 46 minutes after takeoff. The hijackers' intended target is unknown, but the film depicts Jarrah taping a picture of the United States Capitol on the plane's yoke.

The cockpit voice recorder tape from United Flight 93 has never been made public, although a transcript was made public after the film was completed, shedding more light on what actually happened in the 30 minutes before the plane crashed. Some parts contradict the filmmakers' choices in terms of some dialogue and specific aspects of the event. The film depicts the pilots, Jason Dahl and LeRoy Homer, being killed immediately during the hijacking. That was based on documentary evidence from the 9/11 Commission Report, which indicated that at least one passenger reported in a cell phone call seeing two people, possibly the pilots, lying dead or injured on the floor outside the cockpit after the hijacking. Though Dahl is depicted sending out the mayday call, Melody Homer claimed to recognise her husband as the voice of the mayday hailer. Due to the then forthcoming Zacarias Moussaoui trial, Jason Dahl's wife Sandy Dahl was unable to tell Greengrass what she believed really happened regarding her husband. Some statements made by the terrorists in the cockpit voice recorder transcript, as well as moans heard in the background inside the cockpit, raised doubts that both pilots were dead before the plane crashed.

The film depicts the passengers killing Haznawi and Nami before breaching the cockpit and struggling with Jarrah and Ghamdi for the plane's controls before the crash. There is controversy, between some family members of the passengers and the investigative officials, as to whether the passengers managed to breach the cockpit before the plane crashed. The 9/11 Commission Report concluded that "the hijackers remained at the controls but must have judged that the passengers were only seconds from overcoming them", while many of the passengers' family members formed impressions from listening to the audio recordings that the passengers did breach the cockpit and struggled with the hijackers over the controls.

=== Portrayal of Christian Adams ===
There was controversy over the portrayal of German passenger Christian Adams, who is shown trying to warn the hijackers despite the absence of any evidence that he so acted. It was reported that Adams's widow did not cooperate with the filmmakers due to the emotional pain. Sunday Times critic Cosmo Landesman mused, "Surely one of the passengers didn't phone home to point out that there was a cowardly German on board who wanted to give in?" Critic John Harris suggested in a Guardian blog, "there will surely be all kinds of cries about old European surrender monkeys, the United States's contrasting backbone etc." Erich Redman, who portrayed Adams in the film, stated that he did not intend to portray Adams as cowardly, but as a man who "never made rash decisions and everything he did was always well-considered".

== Reception ==
=== Critical response ===
United 93 was one of the most critically acclaimed films of 2006. James Berardinelli, Roger Ebert, Michael Medved, and Peter Travers all awarded it full marks, with Ebert calling it "masterful and heartbreaking" and saying that it "does honor to the memory of the victims". Travers termed it "one of the most moving films of the year", in Rolling Stone. The film holds a 90% rating on Rotten Tomatoes based on 210 reviews, and an average rating of 8.2/10, with the consensus: "Potent and sobering, United 93 treats the subject matter with respect, never resorting to Hollywood aggrandizement." Calling it "gut-wrenching and surprisingly probative", The A.V. Club includes it on a list of "Great Films Too Painful To Watch Twice."

The film has a score of 90 on Metacritic, where it appears on 39 critics' top 10 lists, more than any other 2006 film on the site. The film was ranked first on 47 lists; the most of any 2006 film.

At the website Movie City News, which ranks 250 critics' lists and awards points for list-placement, United 93 ranks as the number one film of 2006 with a score of 917.5 points.

The film has been cited as a favorite by filmmaker John Waters, who presented it as his annual selection at the 2010 Maryland Film Festival. Alex von Tunzelmann of The Guardian gave the film a grade of C, saying: "United 93 is superbly made and authentic in feel, but the choices it makes about what happened on the plane – and who gets to be the heroes – are open to question."

Audiences polled by CinemaScore gave the film an average grade of "A−" on an A+ to F scale.

=== Top 10 lists ===
Only two films (The Departed and The Queen) appeared on more top 10 lists of the best films of 2006 than United 93, and no film received more #1 mentions:

- 1st – Empire
- 1st – J.R. Jones, Chicago Reader
- 1st – Lawrence Toppman, The Charlotte Observer
- 1st – Michael Rechtshaffen, The Hollywood Reporter
- 1st – Michael Sragow, The Baltimore Sun
- 1st – Mike Russell, The Oregonian
- 1st – Noel Murray, The A.V. Club
- 2nd – Claudia Puig, USA Today
- 2nd – James Berardinelli, ReelViews
- 2nd – Marc Mohan, The Oregonian
- 2nd – Michael Phillips, Chicago Tribune
- 2nd – Nathan Rabin, The A.V. Club
- 2nd – Owen Gleiberman, Entertainment Weekly
- 2nd – Shawn Levy, The Oregonian
- 2nd – Sheri Linden, The Hollywood Reporter
- 2nd – Joshua Rothkopf, Time Out New York
- 2nd – Staff, Film Threat
- 3rd – Ann Hornaday, The Washington Post
- 3rd – Desson Thomson, The Washington Post
- 3rd – Marjorie Baumgarten, The Austin Chronicle
- 3rd – Scott Foundas, LA Weekly
- 3rd – Scott Tobias, The A.V. Club
- 3rd – Ty Burr, The Boston Globe
- 4th – Kirk Honeycutt, The Hollywood Reporter
- 4th – Rene Rodriguez, The Miami Herald
- 4th – Richard Corliss, TIME magazine
- 4th – Tasha Robinson, The A.V. Club
- 5th – Frank Scheck, The Hollywood Reporter
- 5th – Keith Phipps, The A.V. Club
- 6th – Roger Ebert, Chicago Sun-Times
- 6th – Peter Travers, Rolling Stone
- 6th – Stephen Holden, The New York Times
- 8th – Dennis Harvey, Variety
- 8th – Kevin Smith
- 8th – Marc Savlov, The Austin Chronicle
- 8th – Ray Bennett, The Hollywood Reporter
- 9th – William Arnold, Seattle Post-Intelligencer

Joe Morgenstern of The Wall Street Journal and Steven Rea of The Philadelphia Inquirer named it among the top ten best films of 2006.

=== Accolades ===
United 93 received numerous awards and nominations from film critics and guilds. The film received two Academy Award nominations—Best Director and Best Film Editing—at the 79th Academy Awards, and six BAFTA nominations, including Best British Film, at the 60th British Academy Film Awards, winning two for Best Director and Best Film Editing.

== Home media ==
United 93 was released to DVD on September 5, 2006, in both widescreen and full screen. Also released was a 2-disc Special Limited Edition in widescreen. A Blu-ray Disc version was released on September 6, 2011. A second Blu-ray release from Universal Studios for the film was released on June 5, 2012, as a part of Universal's Universal 100th Anniversary releases. This version included the same Blu-ray Disc (same transfer and same bonus features) found in the first 2011 release in addition to a DVD and digital copy included in the pack with a brand-new sleeve that was not available with the previous release. For its 20th anniversary, a remastered 4K Ultra HD version was released on Blu-ray and Ultra HD Blu-ray on August 25, 2006.

== See also ==
- List of cultural references to the September 11 attacks
- United 300
- Flight 93 (film), a television drama film released three months earlier
- World Trade Center (film), another 2006 film, directed by Oliver Stone, which centered around the events on the World Trade Center.
