= The Bad News Bears (franchise) =

Media franchise

- Created by: Bill Lancaster
- Original work: The Bad News Bears (1976)
- Owners: Paramount Pictures (Skydance)
- Years: 1976–present

Films and television
- Films: The Bad News Bears (1976); The Bad News Bears in Breaking Training (1977); The Bad News Bears Go to Japan (1978); Bad News Bears (2005)
- Television series: The Bad News Bears (1979–1980)

The Bad News Bears franchise consists of American sports-comedies, based on an original story by Bill Lancaster. The franchise includes theatrical films (the original release, its two sequels, and the 2005 remake), and a television series which aired from 1979–1980.

The franchise as a whole has been met with mixed-to-positive reception. While the original film received positive reaction from critics, with praise directed at its cast; its two sequels gained a mixed and negative reception, respectively. While the television series received an overall warmer response, the remake once again received a mixed-at-best reception from film critics.

== Film ==
=== Bad News Bears (2005) ===
Film	U.S. release date	Director	Screenwriter(s)	Producer(s)
The Bad News Bears	April 7, 1976	Michael Ritchie	Bill Lancaster	Stanley R. Jaffe
The Bad News Bears in Breaking Training	July 8, 1977	Michael Pressman	Paul Brickman	Leonard Goldberg
The Bad News Bears Go to Japan	June 30, 1978	John Berry	Bill Lancaster	Michael Ritchie
Bad News Bears	July 22, 2005	Richard Linklater	John Requa & Glenn Ficarra	Richard Linklater & J. Geyer Kosinski

== Main cast and characters ==
Character	Film				Television series
Character	The Bad News Bears	The Bad News Bears in Breaking Training	The Bad News Bears Go to Japan	Bad News Bears	The Bad News Bears
Kelly Leak	Jackie Earle Haley	Jackie Earle Haley	Jackie Earle Haley	Jeffrey Davies	Gregg Forrest
Ahmad Abdul-Rahim	Erin Blunt	Erin Blunt	Erin Blunt	Kenneth "K.C." Harris	Kristoff St. John
Miguel Aguilar	George Gonzales	George Gonzales	George Gonzales	Carlos Estrada	Charles Nunez
Mike Engelberg	Gary Lee Cavagnaro	Jeffrey Louis Starr	Jeffrey Louis Starr	Brandon Craggs	J. Brennan Smith
Jose Aguilar	Jaime Escobedo	Jaime Escobedo		Emmanuel Estrada	Danny Nunez
Tanner Boyle	Chris Barnes	Chris Barnes		Timmy Deters	Meeno Peluce
Timmy Lupus	Quinn Smith	Quinn Smith		Tyler Patrick Jones	Shane Butterworth
Rudi Stein	David Pollock	David Pollock	David Pollock		Billy Jayne
Toby Whitewood	David Stambaugh	David Stambaugh		Ridge Canipe	
Jimmy Feldman	Brett Marx	Brett Marx	Brett Marx		
Amanda Wurlitzer	Tatum O'Neal	Mentioned		Sammi Kane Kraft	Tricia Cast
Morris Buttermaker	Walter Matthau	Mentioned		Billy Bob Thornton	Jack Warden
Alfred Ogilvie	Alfred W. Lutter	Alfred W. Lutter			Sparky Marcus (as Leslie Ogilvie)
Roy Turner	Vic Morrow			Greg Kinnear (as Ray Bullock)	Phillip Richard Allen
Bob Whitewood	Ben Piazza			Marcia Gay Harden (as Liz Whitewood)	
Joey Turner	Brandon Cruz			Carter Jenkins (as Joey Bullock)	
Regi Tower	Scott Firestone				Corey Feldman
Cleveland	Joyce Van Patten				
Mike Leak		William Devane			
Sy Orlansky		Clifton James			
Carmen Ronzonni		Jimmy Baio			
Officer Mackie		Lane Smith			
Mister Manning		Dolph Sweet			
Morrie Slaytor		Pat Corley			
Carl Rutherford		Douglas Anderson			
Chip Roberts		Jerry Lawson			
Lester Eastland		Fred Stuthman			
Coach Shimizu			Tomisaburo Wakayama		
Antonio Inoki			Himself		
The Network Director			George Wyner		
Louis the Gambler			Lonny Chapman		
E.R.W. Tillyard, III			Matthew Douglas Anton		
Harry Hahn			Regis Philbin		
Matthew Hooper				Troy Gentile	
Prem Lahiri				Aman Johal	
Garo Daragabrigadien				Jeffrey Tedmori	
Shari Bullock				Arabella Holzbog	
Dr. Emily Rappant					Catherine Hicks
Frosty					Bill Lazarus
Josh Matthews					Rad Daly
Student					Persephanie Silverthorn
Marsha					Sherrie Wills

== Reception ==
=== Box office performance ===
Film	Box office gross			Budget	Ref.
Film	North America	Other territories	Worldwide	Budget	Ref.
The Bad News Bears	$42,349,782	—N/a	$42,349,782	$9 million	
The Bad News Bears in Breaking Training	$19,104,350	—N/a	$19,104,350	—N/a	
The Bad News Bears Go to Japan	$7,092,495	—N/a	$7,092,495	—N/a	
Bad News Bears	$32,868,349	$1,384,498	$34,252,847	$35 million	
Total					

=== Critical response ===
Film	Rotten Tomatoes	Metacritic
The Bad News Bears (1976)	97% (33 reviews)	84% (15 reviews)
The Bad News Bears in Breaking Training	50% (10 reviews)	
The Bad News Bears Go to Japan	6% (16 reviews)	
Bad News Bears (2005)	48% (158 reviews)	65 (35 reviews)
