= The Bad News Bears Go to Japan =

1978 film

- Official theatrical release poster
- Directed by: John Berry
- Written by: Bill Lancaster
- Produced by: Michael Ritchie
- Starring: Tony Curtis; Jackie Earle Haley
- Cinematography: Gene Polito
- Edited by: Richard A. Harris; Dennis Virkler
- Music by: Paul Chihara
- Distributed by: Paramount Pictures
- Release date: June 30, 1978
- Running time: 92 minutes
- Country: United States
- Languages: English; Japanese
- Budget: $5 million
- Box office: $14 million

The Bad News Bears Go to Japan (also known as The Bad News Bears 3) is a 1978 American sport comedy film released by Paramount Pictures and was the third and last of a series, following The Bad News Bears and The Bad News Bears in Breaking Training. It stars Tony Curtis and Jackie Earle Haley and features Regis Philbin in a small role and Japanese wrestler Antonio Inoki.

About half of the original or "classic" lineup of Bears players return but many from the previous installments like Jose Agilar (Jaime Escobedo), Alfred Ogilvie (Alfred Lutter), Timmy Lupus (Quinn Smith) and Tanner Boyle (Chris Barnes) are not featured. Three new players are featured: E.R.W. Tillyard III (Matthew Douglas Anton), Abe Bernstein (Abraham Unger) and Ahmad Abdul-Rahim (Erin Blunt)'s younger brother, Mustapha (Scoody Thornton).

This film was followed by a 1979 CBS-TV series, and by a 2005 remake of the 1976 film.

== Plot ==
Small-time promoter/hustler Marvin Lazar sees a potential money-making venture in the Bears that will help him to pay off his debts. After seeing a TV spot about the Bears, he decides to chaperone the baseball team for a trip to Japan in their game against the country's best little league baseball team.

As implied in Breaking Training, the Bears had to defeat the Houston Toros for a shot at the Japanese champs. In the process, the trip sparks off a series of adventures and mishaps for the boys. Team member Kelly Leak develops an interest in local Japanese girl Arika, and a cultural divide emerges in their relationship.

== Cast ==
- Tony Curtis as Marvin P. Lazar
- Jackie Earle Haley as Kelly Leak
- Tomisaburo Wakayama as Coach Shimizu
- Antonio Inoki as Himself
- Hatsune Ishihara as Arika
- George Wyner as Network Director
- Lonny Chapman as Louis
- Matthew Douglas Anton as E.R.W. Tillyard III
- Erin Blunt as Ahmad Rahim
- George Gonzales as Miguel Agilar
- Brett Marx as Jimmy Feldman
- David Pollock as Rudy Stein
- David Stambaugh as Toby Whitewood
- Scoody Thornton as Mustapha Rahim
- Jeffrey Louis Starr as Michael "Mike" Engelberg
- Abraham Unger as Abe Bernstein
- Dick Button as Himself
- Kinichi Hagimoto as Game Show Host
- Hugh Gillin as Pennywall
- Robert Sorrells as Locke
- Clarence Barnes as Mean Bones Beaudine
- Regis Philbin as Harry Hahn
- Michael Yama as Usher
- Tak Kubota as Referee
- Jerry Ziesmer as Eddie of Network
- Gene LeBell as Mean Bones' Manager
- Bin Amatsu as Arika's Father
- Jerry Maren as Page Boy
- Dean A. Okinaka as Manager
- Victor Toyota as Interpreter
- Yangi Kitadani as Fight Announcer
- Marjorie Jackson as Waitress
- Jerry Maren as Page Boy
- Bob Kino as Moderator
- Kyoko Fuji as Madam
- Ginger Martin as Director's Aide
- Daniel Sasaki as Band Leader
- Don Waters as Network Man #1
- Tim P. Sullivan as Network Man #2
- Dick McGarvin as Network Man #3
- James Staley as Network Man #4
- Dennis Freeman as Network Man #5
- Hector Guerrero as Stunt Double

== Reception ==
The film has an 11% rating on Rotten Tomatoes based on 55 reviews. The consensus summarizes: "The Bad News Bears Go to Japan strikes out with its scattershot gags, blatant commercialism, and a charmless turn by Tony Curtis, resulting in a cinematic foul ball that sorely misses the insightful wit of the original." Jackie Earle Haley, who was in the movie, considered it the worst movie ever made.

Vincent Canby of The New York Times wrote that "the film is a demonstration of the kind of desperation experienced by people trying to make something out of a voyage to nowhere". Variety noted the "latest version is more successful than the middle outing, but the situation and characters are getting tired". Gene Siskel of the Chicago Tribune gave the film two stars out of four and wrote: "The story this time is much more confused, with plenty of subplots ... what we should be seeing is play-by-play with the kids and some baseball. There is very little of either". Linda Gross of the Los Angeles Times called it "a very good second sequel" and "a wry and entertaining movie". Gary Arnold of The Washington Post wrote: "Every aspect of the premise that might supply a source of comic and melodramatic renewal—the conflicts that arise between kids and parents, the conflicts between kids and other kids, the culture shock of American Little League Baseball confronting its Japanese counterpart—is neglected or shortchanged in favor of lazy self-imitation".

The film opened in 300 theaters in the Southern United States in early June, grossing $910,000 in its opening weekend. In 38 days it had grossed $9 million and went on to earn theatrical rentals of $7.3 million.

=== Accolades ===
Year	Award	Category	Recipients	Result	Ref.
1979	Stinkers Bad Movie Awards	Worst Picture	The Bad News Bears Go to Japan (Paramount)	Nominated	
2003 (expanded ballot)	Stinkers Bad Movie Awards	Worst Picture	The Bad News Bears Go to Japan (Paramount)	Dishonourable Mention	
2003 (expanded ballot)	Stinkers Bad Movie Awards	Worst Director	John Berry	Dishonourable Mention	
2003 (expanded ballot)	Stinkers Bad Movie Awards	Worst Actor	Tony Curtis	Dishonourable Mention	
2003 (expanded ballot)	Stinkers Bad Movie Awards	Worst Supporting Actor	Jackie Earl Haley	Nominated	
2003 (expanded ballot)	Stinkers Bad Movie Awards	Worst Screenplay	The Bad News Bears Go to Japan (Paramount)	Dishonourable Mention	
2003 (expanded ballot)	Stinkers Bad Movie Awards	Most Painfully Unfunny Comedy	The Bad News Bears Go to Japan (Paramount)	Nominated	
2003 (expanded ballot)	Stinkers Bad Movie Awards	Worst Sequel	The Bad News Bears Go to Japan (Paramount)	Won	
2003 (expanded ballot)	Stinkers Bad Movie Awards	Worst On-Screen Group	The Bad News Bears	Won	

== Home media ==
The Bad News Bears Go to Japan was released on DVD February 12, 2002 by Paramount, in widescreen only.

== See also ==
- Baseball in Japan
- List of baseball films
