= List of accolades received by Little Children =

This is a list of awards and nominations received by Little Children. The film received three Academy Award nominations, including Best Actress for Kate Winslet, Best Supporting Actor for Jackie Earle Haley, and Best Adapted Screenplay for Todd Field and Tom Perrotta.

== Organizations ==
Organization	Category	Recipients	Result
Academy Awards	Best Actress in a Leading Role	Kate Winslet	Nominated
Academy Awards	Best Actor in a Supporting Role	Jackie Earle Haley	Nominated
Academy Awards	Best Screenplay – Adapted	Todd Field and Tom Perrotta	Nominated
BAFTA Awards	Best Actress in a Leading Role	Kate Winslet	Nominated
Golden Globe Awards	Best Film – Drama		Nominated
Golden Globe Awards	Best Actress in a Leading Role – Drama	Kate Winslet	Nominated
Golden Globe Awards	Best Screenplay	Todd Field and Tom Perrotta	Nominated
Gotham Awards	Best Film	Todd Field	Nominated
Satellite Awards	Best Film – Drama		Nominated
Satellite Awards	Best Actor in a Leading Role – Drama	Patrick Wilson	Nominated
Satellite Awards	Best Actress in a Leading Role – Drama	Kate Winslet	Nominated
Satellite Awards	Best Screenplay – Adapted	Todd Field and Tom Perrotta	Nominated
Satellite Awards	Best Overall DVD		Nominated
Young Hollywood Awards	Breakthrough Performance – Male	Patrick Wilson	Won

== Guilds ==
Guild	Category	Recipients	Result
Screen Actors Guild	Outstanding Actress in a Leading Role	Kate Winslet	Nominated
Screen Actors Guild	Outstanding Actor in a Supporting Role	Jackie Earle Haley	Nominated
Writers Guild of America	Best Screenplay – Adapted	Todd Field and Tom Perrotta	Nominated

== Film festivals ==
Festival	Category	Recipients	Result
International Film Festival of Marrakech	Golden Star	Todd Field	Nominated
Palm Springs Film Festival	Visionary Award	Todd Field	Won
Palm Springs Film Festival	Desert Palm Achievement Award	Kate Winslet	Won

== Critics groups ==
Guild	Category	Recipients	Result
Broadcast Film Critics	Best Film (included in list of "Top 10 Films of 2006")		Nominated
Broadcast Film Critics	Best Actress in a Leading Role	Kate Winslet	Nominated
Broadcast Film Critics	Best Writer	Todd Field and Tom Perrotta	Nominated
Chicago Film Critics	Best Actress in a Leading Role	Kate Winslet	Nominated
Chicago Film Critics	Best Actor in a Supporting Role	Jackie Earle Haley	Won
Chicago Film Critics	Best Screenplay – Adapted	Todd Field and Tom Perrotta	Won
Dallas-Fort Worth Film Critics	Best Actor in a Supporting Role	Jackie Earle Haley	Won
Iowa Film Critics	Best Film		Won
Iowa Film Critics	Best Actor in a Supporting Role	Jackie Earle Haley	Won
London Film Critics' Circle	British Actress of the Year	Kate Winslet	Nominated
New York Film Critics Circle	Best Actor in a Supporting Role	Jackie Earle Haley	Won
Online Film Critics Society	Best Actress in a Leading Role	Kate Winslet	Nominated
Online Film Critics Society	Best Actor in a Supporting Role	Jackie Earle Haley	Won
Online Film Critics Society	Best Screenplay – Adapted	Todd Field and Tom Perrotta	Won
San Francisco Film Critics Circle	Best Film		Won
San Francisco Film Critics Circle	Best Actor in a Supporting Role	Jackie Earle Haley	Won
San Francisco Film Critics Circle	Best Screenplay – Adapted	Todd Field and Tom Perrotta	Won
Southeastern Film Critics Association	Best Actor in a Supporting Role	Jackie Earle Haley	Won
