= Wilker =

Wilker is a name. Notable people with the name include:

== Given name ==
- Wilker (footballer, born 1987), full name Wilker Pereira dos Santos, Brazilian football forward
- Wilker Ángel (born 1993), Venezuelan football centre-back
- Wilker (footballer, born 1995), full name Wilker Henrique da Silva, Brazilian football forward

== Surname ==
- Hermann Wilker (1874–1941), German rower
- José Wilker (1944–2014), Brazilian actor and director
- Jonathan Wilker (fl. 2010s), American scientist and engineer
- Josh Wilker (fl. 2010s), American writer
