= The Bad News Bears (TV series) =

American television sitcom

- Genre: Sitcom
- Based on: The Bad News Bears; Bill Lancaster
- Developed by: Bob Brunner; Arthur Silver
- Written by: Paul Diamond; Stephen Fischer
- Directed by: Norman Abbott; William Asher; Bruce Bilson; Jeffrey Ganz; Lowell Ganz; Jeffrey Hayden; Alan Myerson; Gene Nelson
- Starring: Jack Warden; Catherine Hicks; Sparky Marcus; Meeno Peluce; Billy Jayne; Corey Feldman; Shane Butterworth; Kristoff St. John; Tricia Cast
- Theme music composer: David Michael Frank
- Country of origin: United States
- Original language: English
- No. of seasons: 2
- No. of episodes: 26 (3 unaired)

Production
- Executive producers: Bob Brunner; Arthur Silver
- Producers: John Boni; Jeffrey Ganz; Ron Leavitt; Brian Levant; Norman Stiles
- Running time: 22–24 minutes
- Production companies: Huk, Inc. & Frog Productions; Paramount Television

Original release
- Network: CBS
- Release: March 24, 1979 – July 26, 1980

Related
- The Bad News Bears

The Bad News Bears is an American sitcom that aired on CBS from March 24, 1979, until July 26, 1980, consisting of 26 episodes (three unaired by CBS). It was based on the 1976 film of the same name, that was followed by two sequels in 1977 and 1978.

== Synopsis ==
In the television series, Jack Warden portrayed former minor-leaguer Morris Buttermaker, the coach of the W. Wendel Weever Junior High Bears, a team of young adolescents with poor skills and little ability to play baseball. Catherine Hicks played the role of Weever principal Dr. Emily Rappant, and Phillip Richard Allen played Roy Turner, the coach of rival team the Lions. Corey Feldman, Billy Jayne (then credited as Billy Jacoby) and Meeno Peluce were cast amongst the team's players, and Tricia Cast played Amanda Wurlitzer, the Bears' talented pitcher. Kristoff St. John, Cast's future co-star on The Young and the Restless, played Ahmad Abdul-Rahim.

The series was originally scheduled on Saturday nights at 8:00 p.m. In September 1979, it was moved to 8:30 p.m. Three episodes into the series' second season, CBS canceled The Bad News Bears due to low ratings. When CBS broadcast unaired episodes in June 1980, it was moved back to 8:00 p.m. One month later, the series was again moved to the 8:30 timeslot.

== Cast ==
- Jack Warden as Morris Buttermaker
- Catherine Hicks as Dr. Emily Rappant
- Phillip Richard Allen as Roy Turner
- Sparky Marcus as Leslie Ogilvie
- Meeno Peluce as Tanner Boyle
- Billy Jayne as Rudi Stein
- Corey Feldman as Regi Tower
- Shane Butterworth as Timmy Lupus
- Kristoff St. John as Ahmad Abdul-Rahim
- J. Brennan Smith as Mike Engelberg
- Charles Nunez as Miguel Agilar
- Danny Nunez as Jose Agilar
- Tricia Cast as Amanda Wurlitzer
- Bill Lazarus as Frosty
- Gregg Forrest as Kelly Leak
- Rad Daly as Josh Matthews
- Persephanie Silverthorn as Student
- Sherrie Wills as Marsha

== Episodes ==
=== Season 1 (1979) ===
No. overall	No. in season	Title	Directed by	Written by	Original release date
1	1	"Here Comes the Coach"	Bruce Bilson	Bob Brunner, Arthur Silver	March 24, 1979
2	2	"Amanda Joins the Bears"	William Asher	John Boni (s), Hap Schlein (t), Betty Steck (t), Norman Stiles (s)	March 31, 1979
3	3	"Nakedness Is Next to Godliness"	Norman Abbott	Sam Greenbaum	April 7, 1979
4	4	"The Kelly Story"	Norman Abbott	Tom Moore, Jeremy Stevens	April 21, 1979
5	5	"Tanner's Bird"	Jeremy Stevens	Tom Moore, Jeremy Stevens	April 28, 1979
6	6	"Emily Loves Morris"	William Asher	Jeff Franklin	May 5, 1979
7	7	"The Food Caper"	Gene Nelson	Jim Brecher	May 12, 1979
8	8	"Men Will Be Boys"	William Asher	Richard Rosenstock	May 19, 1979
9	9	"Three's a Crowd"	Alan Myerson	Richard Rosenstock	May 26, 1979
10	10	"Save the Bears"	William Asher	Jeff Franklin (t), Elliot Werber (s)	June 2, 1979
11	11	"Dance Fever"	Lowell Ganz	Roy Teicher	June 9, 1979
12	12	"Fielder's Choice"	William Asher	Jeff Franklin	June 23, 1979

=== Season 2 (1979–80) ===
No. overall	No. in season	Title	Directed by	Written by	Original release date
13	1	"Run Down"	Jeffrey Ganz	Jeffrey Ganz, Brian Levant	September 15, 1979
14	2	"Buttermaker Rides Again"	Brian Levant	Ron Leavitt	September 22, 1979
15	3	"First Base"	Ron Leavitt	Ron Leavitt, Brian Levant	September 29, 1979
16	4	"Wedding Bells: Part 1"	William Asher	Paul Diamond	October 6, 1979
17	5	"The Birds, the Bees and the Bears"	Jeffrey Ganz	Richard Rosenstock	June 7, 1980
18	6	"Lights Out"	Jeffrey Hayden	Al Aidekman (t)	June 14, 1980
19	7	"Wedding Bells: Part 2"	Unknown	Unknown	June 21, 1980
20	8	"Matched Set"	Jeffrey Ganz	Cindy Begel, David Lerner	June 28, 1980
21	9	"Old Timers' Day"	William Asher	Allen Goldstein, Levi Taylor	July 12, 1980
22	10	"Scrambled Eggs"	John Tracy	Richard Gurman, Lesa Kite	July 19, 1980
23	11	"Double Play"	William Asher	Fred Fox Jr.	July 26, 1980
24	12	"The Good Life"	William Asher	Judy Olstein	N/A
25	13	"The Pride of the Bears"	William Asher	Richard Rosenstock	N/A
26	14	"The Headless Ghost of MacKintosh Manor"	William Asher	Paul Diamond	N/A

== Syndication ==
In the late 1980s, the show was occasionally rerun on Nickelodeon and Nick at Nite. In the early 1990s, it was rerun on Comedy Central.

== Home media ==
Visual Entertainment released the complete series on DVD in Region 1 in October 2018.
