= Stone Cold (1991 film) =

1991 film by Craig R. Baxley

- U.S. theatrical poster
- Directed by: Craig R. Baxley
- Written by: Walter Doniger
- Produced by: Yoram Ben Ami
- Starring: Brian Bosworth; Lance Henriksen; William Forsythe; Arabella Holzbog; Sam McMurray
- Cinematography: Alexander Gruszynski
- Edited by: Mark Helfrich
- Music by: Sylvester Levay
- Production company: Stone Group Pictures
- Distributed by: Columbia Pictures
- Release date: May 17, 1991
- Running time: 95 minutes
- Country: United States
- Language: English
- Budget: $17–25 million
- Box office: $9.2 million

Stone Cold is a 1991 action film directed by Craig R. Baxley and starring Brian Bosworth, Lance Henriksen and William Forsythe. The film's story centers on a biker gang in Mississippi that tries to assassinate district attorney Brent Whipperton and free Trouble Owens, one of their members who is about to be resentenced to death for the murder of a priest.

Hyped as the first major biker film in decades, and boasting the feature debut of controversial American football star Brian Bosworth, it has a particularly convoluted production history and went through many creative and logistical challenges. It was released on May 17, 1991, to mostly negative reviews, and underperformed at the box office. It has since enjoyed a modest reappraisal, with favorable comparisons being made to the more sanitized approach of modern action pictures.

== Plot ==
Joe Huff is an Alabama cop who has been suspended for excessive violence. After stopping a supermarket robbery, he is summoned by FBI agent Lance Dockery, who takes him to meet with special agent Frank Cunningham. Cunningham blackmails Joe by threatening to turn Joe's three-week suspension into six months without pay. Cunningham wants Joe to go undercover in Mississippi and infiltrate The Brotherhood, a white supremacist biker gang linked to the murders of government officials and suspected of dealing drugs to the mafia. The Brotherhood is led by Chains Cooper.

Joe goes undercover as "John Stone". Tasked with killing a Bolivian man as his initiation, Joe enlists the FBI's help to fake the murder and is accepted into the Brotherhood. However, Chains' right-hand man, Ice Hensley, does not trust Joe and tries to expose him, leading to Ice's death in a high-speed motorcycle chase. Joe learns that the Brotherhood's goal is to eliminate Brent "The Whip" Whipperton, a district attorney running for Governor of Mississippi, who has promised to crack down on crime. They plan to use stolen military weapons to storm the Supreme Court at the Mississippi State Capitol, where Trouble Owens, one of their own, is on trial for murder, to assassinate Whipperton and the judges.

When Chains' girlfriend, Nancy, accidentally learns about Joe's identity, he offers her immunity if she cooperates with the FBI. Though reluctant at first, Nancy accepts his offer, but they are discovered when the Bolivian man Joe had supposedly killed as an initiation returns. Chains shoots and kills Nancy, then straps a bomb to Joe's chest and has him tied up in a helicopter on its way to the Capitol. Joe escapes and seizes control of the helicopter. Inside of the courtroom, Chains retrieves a hidden submachine gun and uses it to kill government agent Martinez, two security officers, all of the justices and Whipperton. Joe overpowers Chains and hands him over to the authorities. Chains frees himself and steals a revolver from an officer, aiming for Joe. Lance intervenes and shoots Chains twice, sending him tumbling over a railing to his death. Joe exits the courthouse as SWAT officers storm the building.

== Cast ==
- Brian Bosworth as Officer Joe Huff / John Stone
- Lance Henriksen as Chains Cooper
- William Forsythe as Ice Hensley
- Arabella Holzbog as Nancy
- Sam McMurray as Agent Lance Dockery
- Richard Gant as Agent Frank Cunningham
- Paulo Tocha as Bolivian
- David Tress as District Attorney Brent "The Whip" Whipperton
- Billy Million as Trouble Owens
- Magic Schwartz as Poker
- Michael Wren as Martinez
- Renee O'Connor as Tinselteeth
- Kevin Page as Mobster
- Nick Dimitri as Trucker
- Tom Magee as Mountain
- Illana Diamant as Officer Sharon

== Production ==
=== Development ===
The project started with producer Mace Neufeld, and was intended as a prestige thriller headlined by James Caan but that version stalled due to difficulties with the script. Neufeld later partnered with Moshe Diamant to pitch it, under the title Heart of Stone, to football player and aspiring actor Brian Bosworth. Diamant's Epic Productions had formed a joint venture with Michael Douglas and Rick Bieber's Stonebridge Entertainment called the Stone Group and the Douglas connection was an added incentive to Bosworth. Joining the other executive producers was Gary Wichard, Bosworth's personal manager who had spearheaded his transition to movies. Producer duties were entrusted to Yoram Ben Ami, CEO of Triumph Releasing, a Columbia Pictures subsidiary that usually dealt with Diamant's product. During pre-production, the screenplay was attributed to Walter Doninger and Howard Cushnir (the latter is absent from the final credits). It was retooled for Bosworth, who consulted with the writers over about one year.

A late pre-production report claimed that the story was to be set in the Midwest. However, Ben Ami indicated that the Deep South region had been chosen because it was in the script, and some of the eventual locations had been in talks to host since at least summer 1989. Although Arkansas, whose capitol building had recently appeared in Under Siege, came under consideration, Mississippi was chosen as the central location after Governor Ray Mabus, then involved in a lobbying campaign to woo Hollywood to his state, personally signed on to allow use of his own statehouse in February. Two months of location scouting took place in spring 1990 across East Louisiana, Western Alabama and both North Mississippi and the Gulf Coast.

=== Casting ===
Bosworth was paid $500,000 to star as undercover cop Joe Huff, This was his first non-football role, and he trained extensively with acting coach Harold Guskin. Wichard, who was noted for his hyperbolic statements, claimed that some of the lessons lasted up to 20 hours. Michelle Johnson signed on to play Huff's wife, while Punky Brewster's Ami Foster was cast as his troubled younger sister, but creative changes led to both characters being cut during production. Lance Henriksen and Arabella Holzbog had appeared together shortly before in The Last Samurai. Henriksen had also co-starred with William Forsythe in the 1985 biker movie Savage Dawn.

The lead actors trained with biker and stuntman Greg "Magic" Schwartz. Bosworth and Henriksen, both motorcycle enthusiasts, personally oversaw the customization of their bikes for the film. Henriksen's was painted by Jane Pollack, a member of the film's art department, who would later become his wife although the two did not connect on this shoot. Henriksen was unconvinced by the background players selected to portray his "Brotherhood", and personally toured Gulf Coast bike shops to recruit some that looked more legitimate. However, when a reporter mistakenly stated that Henriksen was a real-life member of the Bandidos MC gang, a rebuttal had to be quickly put out to avoid tensions with any of them.

=== Early filming ===
Preliminary photography on the film, now known as The Brotherhood, started in the Bienville neighborhood of Mobile, Alabama on May 23, 1990, during a concert sponsored by local radio 92 ZEW. Early reports put the start of filming in March 1990, but Malmuth claimed that he chose to work in the heat of summer to make the actors more edgy. More preliminary filming took place on May 27, 1990, in Gulfport, Mississippi, as the filmmakers wanted to take advantage of the annual Gulf Coast Memorial Day Blowout, a chopper gathering. There, the crew came in contact with a member of the local Asgard Motorcycle Club, who was enrolled as an additional consultant.

Principal photography officially started on June 4, 1990, in Mobile. 60 days of filming were scheduled for a late August finish. The original schedule called for three weeks in the Mobile area, one day at Pensacola Beach, followed by five weeks around Biloxi, two weeks in Jackson and two days in New Orleans. The film's starting budget was announced at $10 or 11 million. The crew consisted of about 120 members, including original cinematographer John R. Leonetti, making his feature debut.

=== Mid-production reboot ===
On June 25, Bruce Malmuth left the movie, having only directed thirteen days. Production went dark for three days, after which he was replaced by Craig R. Baxley, who had recently directed I Come in Peace for Diamant. Baxley and Stonebridge were quickly sued for $2 million by Barry & Enright Productions, makers of the TV movie Not of This World, which Baxley had abandoned to take over The Brotherhood, but the dispute was resolved a few weeks later. Malmuth called the split a "non hostile, amicable" one, resulting from his push towards a psychological approach, which Baxley described as "almost too dark". An unnamed crew member told the Los Angeles Times of the influence wielded by Bosworth, and particularly Wichard, on set. Wichard himself took responsibility for streamlining the film, telling the paper: "some 17-year-old kid [was] going to say, 'Oh man, Boz, what are you doing?' I had to sell this movie. I had to give them what they expected."

In a 2014 interview, however, Bosworth spoke highly of The Brotherhood's original vision, which had a large subplot dedicated to Huff's family, and deemed that the film would have been better for it. He instead blamed Malmuth and Leonetti's technical mistakes, which supposedly made their footage unusable. Others recalled the axed content in a much less favorable light. In his 2011 memoirs, Henriksen described his original dialogue, which largely consisted of Bible quotes, as "ridiculous", and pleaded with Baxley to let him change it as soon as he arrived. In a 2013 interview, Forsythe lambasted the "[w]orst script ever written", adding, "basically, I don’t think there was one line from the script that we actually said in the movie." Hasty rewrites were made by Doninger, Cushnir and Harley Peyton based on collective feedback.

=== Filming continued ===
Much of the Mobile footage shot by Malmuth was scrapped, although a few local landmarks remain visible in the finished film, such as the Bankhead Tunnel. Filming resumed on July 5. Baxley indicated that he wanted to add two weeks to the schedule and reshoot most of the Mobile scenes to set the entire film on the Gulf Coast. Bosworth claimed to have been told that his family scenes would be included, only to see that option abandoned after production ran out of money, having burnt $4 million of a projected $8 million budget on the discarded material. Bosworth, Henrisksen and Forsythe rewrote some or much of their lines, often on the day of filming. As a result of this unexpected freedom, Henriksen remembered the movie as a particularly enjoyable experience despite its overall travails. The Sheer Yachts boatyard in Ocean Springs was transformed to recreate the Brotherhood's hangout, and host a few ancillary scenes. Bosworth suffered a knee injury at the location on July 11, but did not miss any days. Bosworth performed a higher-than-average share of his stunts, including driving his bike during select action sequences. Baxley's father Paul served as stunt coordinator on the film.

=== IATSE strike ===
Problems kept coming on July 16, when thirty to thirty-five crew members went on strike to demand better wages and benefits, under encouragement from the IATSE union, whose local representative warned that the dispute would cost The Stone Group an additional $40,000 per day. The production was sanctioned by the Directors Guild of America and Screen Actors Guild, but did not recognize other labor groups. As such, the film's technicians were signed to a flat fee. Filming was again suspended but, since Mississippi was a right-to-work state, the concerned workers were summarily fired and fifty new ones were brought in. This included cinematographer Leonetti, who was replaced by Alexander Gruszynski and complained that he stood to lose $50,000 in wages. Meanwhile, on July 17, Bosworth was officially released from his NFL contract by the Seattle Seahawks, although this was expected due to his persistent shoulder issues, and he already considered himself an actor first.

=== Final weeks on the Gulf Coast ===
Filming resumed on July 19. The sandpit fight scene between Bosworth and pro wrestler Tom Magee was shot in Bay St. Louis. It was aborted after a first attempt where Bosworth clipped Magee's cheek with a punch, and finished two weeks later on August 9. While a King Features gossip column claimed that the botch had led to a real scuffle, Bosworth himself assured that the accident had been handled in a civil manner by both. The final scene shot on the Gulf Coast was a gas station explosion on Daisy Vestry Road in Latimer on August 10.

=== Relocation to Arkansas ===
With filming still underway in Mississippi, reports emerged that Lieutenant Governor Brad Dye was about to renege on Governor Mabus' permission to stage the finale at Jackson's State Capitol. Various reasons were mooted, ranging from the removal of a Magnolia tree (which would actually have been replanted afterwards), to graphic violence unbecoming of the institution, to potential damage to the building's antique windows. However, insiders posited that it was in fact retaliation against Mabus from within his own party, for allowing filming without consulting his Lieutenant Governor and House Speaker Tim Ford, who both had a legal say in the matter.

Democratic state representatives Scott Ross and Robert Moak filed a motion to block the shoot, with Ross arguing that "[a]ny film whose major star is Brian Bosworth is grade-B at best and would do nothing to enhance the image of the state." While Ben Ami had successfully applied to use Jackson's Hinds County Courthouse as a fallback option, he instead announced on August 4 that his crew would relocate to Arkansas, whose Secretary of State Bill McCuen chided his neighbors for their risk aversion. Dye penned a letter to trade magazine Variety to justify his stance, and made a token offer to reinstate the shoot if displays of violence were cut, to which the filmmakers did not bother responding. Mississippi Film Commission boss Phil Cole resigned over the incident.

Filming in Arkansas took place in Conway and Little Rock. A few locals, most notably Arkansas Gazette columnist John Brummett, also objected to the staging of a violent picture at their State Capitol, but the venue did close for filming during the second weekend of September. In a bizarre coincidence, one of its own Magnolia trees burned down during the staging of the helicopter crash. McCuen ordered that the hole be covered to conceal the mishap before it reopened to the public. Principal photography belatedly ended on September 26, 1990. However, more reshoots had to be staged in early 1991 in Los Angeles.

Estimates of the film's final budget have varied. Wichard quoted it as $17 million after the mid-production reboot, but $25 million before launch. However, a Stonebridge executive reiterated at the same time that the cost-conscious production had been capped to $17 million. In August 1991, Epic Productions sued producer Yoram Ben Ami for $8 million, accusing him of being responsible for many of the film's creative and logistical woes, resulting in cost overruns that took it from a projected $7 million budget to more than $15 million. The outcome of the lawsuit was not publicized.

== Release ==
=== Pre-release ===
Before being preempted by its bigger sister label TriStar, the film was intended for release by Ben Ami's Triumph Releasing. The release date was originally pegged for January 1991, or February after the film's partial reboot in July. The first full release date to be floated around was May 3, 1991. The original cut was given an NC-17 rating, in what was claimed to be a first for an action film. The producers immediately assured that they were committed to securing an R rating, and edits were made accordingly. Bosworth embarked on an eight-city tour to promote the film, which avoided Seattle. The Seahawks refused to field media inquiries about their former player in the run-up to Stone Cold's release.

The film's premiere took place at Universal Studios on May 16, 1991. In keeping with the film's tone, invitations bore the mention "No suits allowed", and Wichard chartered 250 Harley Davidsons, allowing some of the approximately 800 guests to ride two-up to the venue. The boisterous Wichard publicly denigrated other action stars for their advancing age and Arnold Schwarzenegger for looking awkward in a publicity shot as a biker. Bosworth floated the idea of changing his name to Bozworth, an allusion to his football nickname "The Boz", before conceding that it was another of his manager's publicity stunts. Wichard also pushed for the title change from The Brotherhood to Stone Cold to better emphasize his client.

=== Box office ===
In North America, Stone Cold opened on 1729 screens through TriStar Pictures on May 17, 1991. It debuted in fifth place, drawing $2.8 million in its first weekend, and quickly fell off the charts, ending its run with a disappointing $9.2 million at the domestic box office. In the U.K., the movie was also distributed by Columbia TriStar and opened on June 19, 1992, only reaching eighth place.

It perhaps fared best in Germany, where it was a minor success for independent distributor Ascot Elite, drawing 781,000 admissions in a medium-wide release and spending four weeks in the nation's top ten.

== Reception ==
=== Contemporary ===
On Rotten Tomatoes it has a score of 38% based on 13 reviews. Audiences surveyed by CinemaScore gave the film a grade of "B+" on scale of A+ to F. Before release, Stonebridge executive Andrew Pfeiffer warned: "This kind of movie is not designed to get good reviews."

The Variety reviewer credited as Bril. expressed doubts about Bosworth's star potential and assessed: "Actually, the budding star here is probably director Craig R. Baxley, who recently directed the sci-fi thriller I Come in Peace. He shows a real flair for stunt work and action sequences in both works. Too bad the story is so mindnumbingly dense." Fellow trade magazine The Hollywood Reporter called it a "half-baked action thriller" but still deemed it "enjoyable." Owen Gleiberman of Entertainment Weekly deemed that "the routinely scripted but kinetic Stone Cold is a throwback to Roger Corman's Hell's Angels flicks." He praised Henriksen and Forsythe for elevating the material, writing: "When they're on-screen, [the film] doesn't feel quite as B-movie-ish."

Michael Wilmington of the Los Angeles Times accepted that "[t]he movie, full of unrelenting sadism, sleazy posturing and ludicrous dialogue—and some nice cinematography by Alexander Gruszynski—is far from boring." However he saw it as the ultimate example of "action movies [which] have begun to seem an end in themselves [...] as if nothing mattered any more but the sheer logistics of reducing some location to fiery chaos and rubble." Chris Hicks of Utah's Deseret News was put off by the film's violence, calling it "the bottom of the barrel" and Bosworth "a boorish clown on the field and even more boorish and clownish in his movie debut".

In her nationally syndicated San Jose Mercury News review, Annette John-Hall found that "Stone Cold is a taylor-made vehicle for Bosworth, but the unpredictability and zaniness that made 'the Boz' a household name as a football player is lacking for Boz, the actor." In the city that Bosworth once called home, Steve Kelley of The Seattle Times urged: "Don’t fall for the Bosworth pitch. He is as much a fraud on the big screen as he was on the gridiron." His Post-Intelligencer counterpart William Arnold disagreed, finding Stone Cold "a violent, R-rated action piece, but well directed, rather lavishly produced, filled with imaginative stunts, and it doesn't have a dull moment in it."

Richard Harrington of The Washington Post deemed that much of the film consisted of "plain silly, regurgitated biker-film cliches underscored with awful hard rock cliches", although he conceded that it partially redeemed itself during the climax where "the action becomes so preposterous that you'll feel less cheated than you would otherwise." Stephen Holden of The New York Times noted that the film's humorous character traits are "never developed" but granted that "[o]nce the movie gets down to business, the muscle and pyrotechnics take over. The action — especially the motorcycle chases through the marble government halls — packs a fairly good visceral charge.

Among the film's defenders was Jim Sullivan of the The Boston Globe, who deemed that "Stone Cold is no masterpiece, but it is cut from Road Warrior cloth, meaning there is grit and dirt, a believable villain, a scum-bucket biker gang, low-tires-eye camera angles and a certain ferocity." He added that "in a day where Arnold Schwarzenegger and Steven Seagal are megastars, it's not so far fetched to picture Bosworth [...] in the same muscle-bound pantheon". Despite an implausible finale, the film was "still recommended for fans of the genre". Dale Stevens of The Cincinnati Post called it "a respectable film, beautifully photographed, especially in the many action scenes", which "offers two lessons: (1) a decent movie can be made about bikers (2) Brian Bosworth, a controversial football player, can become an actor in the Schwarzenegger mold." Similarly, Joe Leydon of the The Houston Post commended Bosworth and deemed that "Stone Cold is a rude and undeniably exciting exploitation flick, a dum-dum bullet of a movie that races from one explosion of high-testosterone ultraviolence to the next, often leaving the audience slack-jawed through the sheer audacity of its excess."

=== Retrospective ===
Retrospective reviews have typically been more appreciative. Craig Butler of AllMovie wrote that "Stone Cold might seem like a throwaway action film built around a sports personality but it's actually much more. In fact, this is a model b-movie". Of the cast, he said that "Bosworth acquits himself well as the hero" and "Lance Henriksen is charming and chilling", while "William Forsythe delivers a feral, rip-snorting turn". He also pointed that "Craig Baxley does an excellent job in the director's chair."

Svet Atanasoff of Blu-ray.com deemed that "Stone Cold might be the ultimate macho action film". Not convinced by Bosworth's contention that the excision of its family themes doomed the film, he claimed that he had "always liked it". Ian Jane of DVD Talk commented that "Stone Cold may be dumber than a bag of rocks, and Brian Bosworth might have all the acting charisma of a corn flake, but hot damn if this movie isn't a fantastic slice of brainless action moviemaking done right." John Higgins of Starburst called it "a no-brainer of an action film, following a traditional template and with sufficient bang, clever editing and brutal violence to just carry it over the finish line." Comparing it to Brandon Lee's equally neglected Rapid Fire, he concluded that "it may be short on plot and character, but it is a highly effective action thriller".

=== Accolades ===
Brian Bosworth's performance in the film earned him a nomination for the Golden Raspberry Award for Worst New Star at the 12th Golden Raspberry Awards.

== Soundtrack ==
The film's original score was composed by Sylvester Levay. Electric guitars feature prominently, in contrast with Levay's more famous synth-driven sound. The film also features licensed songs, most notably from The Doobie Brothers and Sheryl Crow. Other featured artists, such as Saigon Kick and Cryer (who perform on screen during the strip club scene) were signed to Third Stone Records, a label recently founded by Michael Douglas and music producer Richard Rudolph.

== Post-release ==
=== Home media ===
The film arrived on domestic videocassette on October 30, 1991, through Columbia TriStar Home Video. It fared more respectably on the home market, shipping close to 140,000 units at launch. The film was reissued on domestic DVD by MGM Home Entertainment on June 12, 2007. It made its domestic Blu-ray debut through Olive Films on June 23, 2015. Kino Lorber will release the film on 4K Blu-ray on April 26, 2026.

=== Special screening ===
A special 35mm screening of the film was organized by Austin's Alamo Drafthouse theater on May 4, 2014, in presence of Bosworth who took part in a Q&A session with the audience.

=== Legacy ===
Baxley, and the film's publicists, touted Stone Cold as the first major biker film since Easy Rider. Henriksen refuted the comparison, as Rider was not intended as a mainstream hit, but called Stone Cold the first "A" example since The Wild One and agreed with Baxley that it might spark a revival of the genre. Around the same time, Harley Davidson and the Marlboro Man was being developed at MGM, while Live Entertainment's Beyond the Law was shot shortly after. None of these films made much of an impact, but the personal praise Henriksen derived from Stone Cold was considered "a huge career boost" by the actor.

=== Spiritual successor ===
In 1997, Bosworth starred in Back in Business, a spiritual successor which was announced under the title Heart of Stone—once also considered for the title of Stone Cold.
