= Daniel Ezralow =

American artistic director, choreographer, and performer (born 1956)

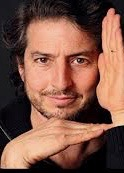
Daniel Ezralow

Daniel Ezralow (born 22 September 1956) is an artistic director, choreographer, dancer, writer, and performer. He is known for his work in theater, film, opera, and television. He is the artistic director and founder of Ezralow Dance, a movement based ensemble and the creative home for Ezralow's body of work.

== Career ==
Ezralow studied dance at the University of California at Berkeley and graduated in 1976. He began as a dancer with the dance companies 5X2 Plus, Lar Lubovitch, Paul Taylor, and Pilobolus. He was one of the original dancer-choreographers of MOMIX and is a founding member of ISO Dance. In The New York Times review in 1986, the reviewer noted that "Daniel Ezralow is an unforgettably gutsy and intelligent virtuoso dancer."

He has created original works for, among others, Hubbard Street Dance Chicago, Batsheva Dance Company of Israel, the London Contemporary Dance Theatre, and the Cirque du Soleil show LOVE. His company, the Daniel Ezralow Dance Company performed at the Tel Aviv Performing Arts Center, Israel, in the 2008-09 season.

His works for opera include The Flying Dutchman, for the Los Angeles and Houston Opera Companies, Maggio Musicale's Aida with Zubin Mehta as conductor, and the Paris Opera Ballet. He also choreographs for advertising campaigns including The GAP, Issey Miyake, and Hugo Boss.

For theater he choreographed The Green Bird on Broadway in 2000 and Cats in Italy in 2009 for Compagnia della Rancia. He was the choreographer and aerial choreographer for the Broadway show musical adaptation of the Spider-Man comics, working with director Julie Taymor, in 2011.

In 2014 he choreographed the opening ceremony for the Sochi Olympics. In 2016 Ezralow toured with his dance company, Ezralow Dance, throughout America including dates at the Prince Theater and the Wallis Annenberg Center. He returned to the Annenberg later in 2017. Ezralow collaborated with Katy Perry and Skip Marley on the 59th Grammy awards, where Perry debuted her song "Chained to the Rhythm".

== Work ==
=== Stage Director ===
- EXPO 2020 Opening & Closing Ceremonies (Stage Director and Supervising Choreographer)
- PEARL, Spring, River, Flower, Moon (2015) (Writer, Director, Choreographer)
- JOSH GROBAN in Concert (2002) (Creator, Director, Staging)

=== Film ===
- MEGALOPOLIS(2024) (Choreographer)
- THE OPERA(2024) (Choreographer)
- Love and Other Drugs (2010) (Choreographer)
- Across the Universe (2007) (Choreographer)
- American Gun (2002) (Choreographer)
- How the Grinch Stole Christmas (2000) (Choreographer)
- Earth Girls Are Easy (1988) (Actor, Choreographer)
- The Witches Sabbath (1988) (Actor)
- Camorra (A Story of Streets, Women and Crime) (Actor Choreographer) (1985)

=== Television ===
- The Brit Awards (2017) (choreographer)
- The 59th Grammy Awards (2017) (choreographer)
- The 78th Annual Academy Awards (2006) (choreographer)
- The 43rd Grammy Awards (2001) (choreographer)
- The 70th Annual Academy Awards (1998) (choreographer) (performer)
- The Last Concert / L'Ultimo Concerto (actor) (1996)

=== Commercials ===
- Spot arcobaleno Telecom Italia (2013)

=== Theatre ===
- Spider-Man: Turn Off the Dark (2011) (Choreographer and Aerial Choreographer)
- Cats (2009) (Co-Director) (Choreographer)
- Love (Cirque du Soleil) (2006) (Choreographer)
- The Green Bird (2000) (Choreographer)

=== Opera ===
- ‘’ Macbeth’’ Teatro all Scala Milano (2022]
- The Flying Dutchman Los Angeles Opera (1995)
- AIDA Maggio Musicale Fiorentino (1998)

=== Dance ===
- Hoover Hallucinations(1983)
- Psycho Killer(1985)
- Dogfish(1985)
- SVSPLKT(1986
- XSTASIS(1987)
- Un complicato intrigo di donne, vicoli e delitti (CAMORRA) (1986)
- Eight Heads (1988)
- SUPER STRAIGHT is coming down (1989)
- SF (2005)

=== Special Events ===
- ‘’2014 Sochi Winter Olympics Opening Ceremonies’’ (choreographer)
- ‘’2002 Salt Lake City Olympic Art Festival’’ (choreographer)
- ‘’1992 Albertville Opening Winter Paralympic Games’’ (choreographer)

== Personal life ==
In 1999 Ezralow married Arabella Holzbog, the daughter of Thomas Jerald Holzbog, an architect, and they have two Children.
