= The Bad News Bears in Breaking Training =

1977 film

- Official theatrical release poster
- Directed by: Michael Pressman
- Written by: Paul Brickman
- Produced by: Leonard Goldberg
- Starring: William Devane; Clifton James
- Cinematography: Fred J. Koenekamp
- Edited by: John W. Wheeler
- Music by: Craig Safan
- Distributed by: Paramount Pictures
- Release date: July 29, 1977
- Running time: 99 minutes
- Country: United States
- Language: English
- Box office: $19,104,350

The Bad News Bears in Breaking Training is a 1977 American sports comedy-drama film and a sequel to the 1976 feature film The Bad News Bears.

The Bad News Bears in Breaking Training was released by Paramount Pictures on July 29, 1977. The film received mixed reviews from critics and grossed $19,194,350.

== Plot ==
One year after their infamous second-place finish in the North Valley League, the Bad News Bears are left reeling by the departure of Morris Buttermaker as their coach, Amanda Whurlitzer as their pitcher, and an injury to outcast-turned-hero Timmy Lupus. Faced with a chance to play the Texas champion Houston Toros team for a shot at the Japanese champs, they devise a way to get to Houston without a coach, in order to play at the famed Astrodome, between games of a Major League Baseball doubleheader.

At first unsure of making the trip with the team, Kelly Leak decides to go, in order to reunite with his estranged father, Mike Leak, who left him and his mother nine years prior. After being discovered in a hotel without a chaperone by the Houston Police, Leak recruits his father as the new coach. Feeling obligated, Mike accepts. Gearing up for their game, the Bears, as a whole, have trouble during practice; Kelly becomes increasingly angry and resentful towards his father (for being there for the Bears, when he was not there for him growing up) before ultimately storming off, while newly recruited pitcher Carmen Ronzonni has trouble finding his own unique style, since he has always resorted to imitating famous pitchers.

The team soon becomes a more cohesive and athletic unit under Mike's guidance. After a skirmish with several of the Toros, Kelly later has a heart-to-heart talk with his father at a local pool hall, where Mike apologizes for his past mistakes. Kelly accepts his apology, and returns to the team before the game. The game gets called halfway through due to network television broadcast time limits for the Major League double-header games, but Tanner refuses to leave the field, since he wants to "win one for 'The Looper'", who could not attend the game.

After watching Tanner evade two officials trying to catch him on the field, Mike rallies the crowd with a "Let them play!" chant, which eventually persuades the venue to continue the game. The Bears pull off an upset win, and Kelly finally makes peace with his absentee father, telling him if the team did not need a coach he still would have looked him up.

== Cast ==
=== Main cast ===
- William Devane as Mike Leak: Coach of the Bears and Kelly's estranged father, whom he looks up in Houston after a nine-year absence. He's a good natured, blue-collar working man who agrees to coach the team, mostly because of his guilt for leaving Kelly and his wife in the past.
- Jackie Earle Haley as Kelly Leak: Local troublemaker who has matured since the first film. The Bears' leader (and presumably, the oldest) he drives the "borrowed" custom van that brings the team to Houston. The team's strongest hitter, he plays left field and wears the number 3.
- Clifton James as Sy Orlansky, Houston-based rep for Anheuser-Busch, who is sponsoring and promoting the game between the Bears and the local favorite, Houston Toros.
- Chris Barnes as Tanner Boyle, short-tempered shortstop with a Napoleon complex who continually challenges authority. He refuses to leave the field in Houston after the game was called for time. Tanner is now close friends with Timmy Lupus, who could not make the trip. Wears the number 12.
- Erin Blunt as Ahmad Abdul-Rahim, Who plays center field. He worries a few times about the team going to "the joint" (jail) for having no adult with them. Rahim idolizes Hank Aaron, and wears number 44 in his honor.
- Jeffrey Louis Starr as Mike Engelberg: An overweight, out-of-shape boy who plays catcher and has developed into a good hitter. He loves chocolate and Kentucky Fried Chicken. Wears the number 15.
- Jimmy Baio as Carmen Ronzonni: Flashy starting pitcher from back east (presumably New York) who is more talk than action. Carmen is brought to the team by friend Kelly Leak in the hopes of revitalizing the team. With the help of Coach Leak, he finds his own style and shows improvement throughout the film. Wears the number 11.
- Alfred W. Lutter as Alfred Ogilvie: A bookworm who memorizes baseball statistics and acts as the team's scout. He gets information on the team's Houston rival, The Toros, from two girls who know the team. He's mostly a benchwarmer who assists the coach with defensive strategy. A backup outfielder/first baseman and wears the number 9.
- David Stambaugh as Toby Whitewood: An unassuming, intelligent boy and team peacemaker who plays first base. Because of this, he is able to pull off the hidden ball trick in the final game. Wears the number 2.
- Jaime Escobedo as Jose Aguilar, Miguel's brother; plays right field, speaks some English and wears the number 6.
- George Gonzales as Miguel Aguilar, Jose's brother; plays second base. He is nicknamed "Handsome" by Coach Leak, speaks no English and wears the number 7.
- Brett Marx as Jimmy Feldman: Fairly quiet third baseman with curly blond hair. During his at-bat, the opposing team's catcher says, "You got one of the Marx Brothers up here". Wears the number 8.
- David Pollock as Rudi Stein, a nervous relief pitcher and backup outfielder, continually afraid of being hit by an errant pitch when at bat (which he does). Rudi wears glasses, he's mostly a benchwarmer. Wears the number 10.
- Quinn Smith as Timmy Lupus, a shy, bedridden outfielder for the team who broke his leg while skateboarding, and only appears early on in the film, as he cannot join the team on their trip to Houston. Bullied by him in the first film, now good friends with Tanner Boyle, who carries the mantra "let's win one for the Looper" during the team's journey.

=== Supporting cast ===
- Lane Smith as Officer Mackie
- Dolph Sweet as Mister Manning
- Pat Corley as Morrie Slaytor
- Douglas Anderson as Carl Rutherford
- Jerry Lawson as Chip Roberts
- Fred Stuthman as Lester Eastland

== Production ==
The scene where the cops roll by the van driven by Kelly Leak (Jackie Earle Haley) was shot on Balboa Blvd in Granada Hills, California.

When the team arrives in downtown Houston, they book a room at the Concord Hotel. The building is actually the Lancaster Hotel, located off Texas Avenue across from Jones Hall.

The scene where Kelly meets with his father Mike Leak (William Devane) for the first time was filmed at the Texas Pipe Bending Company, a real business located at 2500 Galveston Road (the Park Memorial Church can be seen across the street).

Later in the film, the Bears stay at the Houston Hilton; the actual hotel is located at 6633 Travis Street in Houston, but the filming location was the Pasadena Hilton in Pasadena, California.

The scene was filmed at Bayland Park, where Coach Leak confronts Sy Orlansky (Clifton James) about playing the Bears instead of the Falcons from El Paso. The Toros practice scenes were filmed on the Sharpstown Little League fields, with extras including girls from area middle schools.

== Music ==
The main theme song of the film, "Lookin' Good", was sung by James Rolleston.

== Cameos ==
Members of the 1976–1977 Houston Astros make a cameo appearance during the film's climactic scene. They include Bill Virdon, César Cedeño, Enos Cabell, Ken Forsch, Bob Watson, and J.R. Richard.

== Release ==
The film was released in selected theatres from coast-to-coast in the United States on July 29, 1977. There were some sneak previews of the film on July 22, 1977.

== Reception ==
Unlike its predecessor, The Bad News Bears in Breaking Training received mixed reviews. Rotten Tomatoes gives the film a 42% rating based on 65 reviews. The consensus summarizes: "Leaning on cheap sentimentality and forced hijinks, The Bad News Bears in Breaking Training comes across as a poor imitation of its predecessor with a supreme dearth of charm and satirical wit."

Vincent Canby of The New York Times called it "a manufactured comedy of a slick order, depending almost entirely for its effects on the sight and sound of a bunch of kids behaving as if they were small adults. It's a formula that worked for Our Gang comedy for many years, and works again here with a bright screenplay by Paul Brickman, based on Bill Lancaster's original characters, and direction of intelligent lightness by Michael Pressman". Arthur D. Murphy of Variety called it "a pale but adequately summer-commercial sequel to the extremely successful Bad News Bears Paramount hit of last year. Leonard Goldberg's production has a made-for-tv look (it even seems already pre-cut for the tube), a fair Paul Brickman script and passable direction by Michael Pressman". Gene Siskel of the Chicago Tribune gave the film 2.5 stars out of 4, finding the climactic game "enjoyable" but that the film otherwise "tries too hard" in its attempts at "heart-tugging emotion". Charles Champlin of the Los Angeles Times called it "a poorly plotted, indifferently directed, noisily overacted movie" that nevertheless "will probably do well" on the strength of the original. Gary Arnold of The Washington Post wrote that the film "struggles to justify itself as something more than a pale copy [of the original] by resorting to exaggerated displays of ribaldry and lovability". Maureen Orth wrote in Newsweek: "When the boys who play the Bears are on screen, which is often, their natural high spirits and spontaneity do much to enliven the tired script and soft direction. Kids will still find watching them vacation-time fun. But in the end, The Bad News Bears without Matthau, O'Neal and Ritchie is like the Mets without Tom Seaver - deep in the doldrums". John Simon wrote: "The film is overwhelmingly uninteresting" and "enough lousy films like this, and we could unite all warring factions. Shucks".

This film is remembered for the scene in which Astros player Bob Watson first says, "Let the kids play". Coach Leak then leads the Astrodome crowd in the chant "Let them play!" when the umpires attempt to call the game prematurely because of time constraints. The crowd at the 2002 Major League Baseball All-Star Game also used this chant when the announcement came that the game would end in a tie at the end of the inning if neither team scored.

Soft Skull Press published a 2011 book about The Bad News Bears in Breaking Training as part of their Deep Focus series. It was authored by Josh Wilker.

== See also ==
- List of baseball films
