= San Francisco Film Critics Circle Awards 2006 =

Annual US film awards ceremony

5th SFFCC Awards

December 12, 2006

Best Picture:
Little Children

The 5th San Francisco Film Critics Circle Awards, honoring the best in film for 2006, were given on 12 December 2006.

== Winners ==
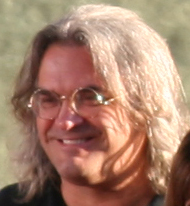
Paul Greengrass, Best Director winner

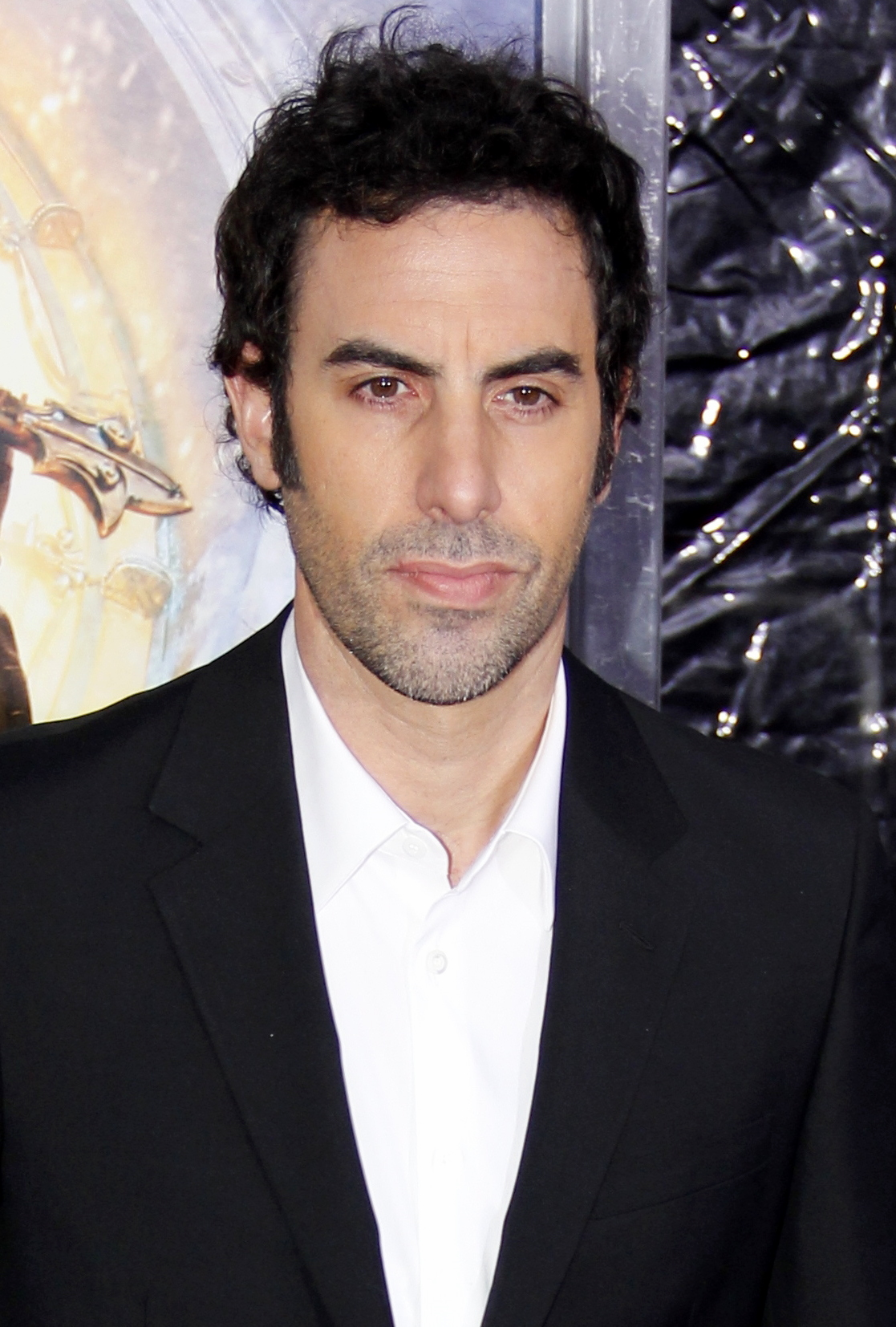
Sacha Baron Cohen, Best Actor winner

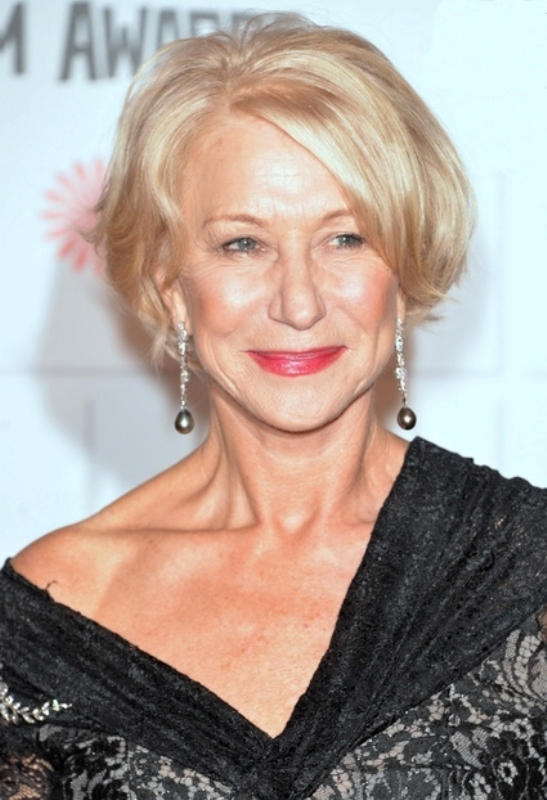
Helen Mirren, Best Actress winner

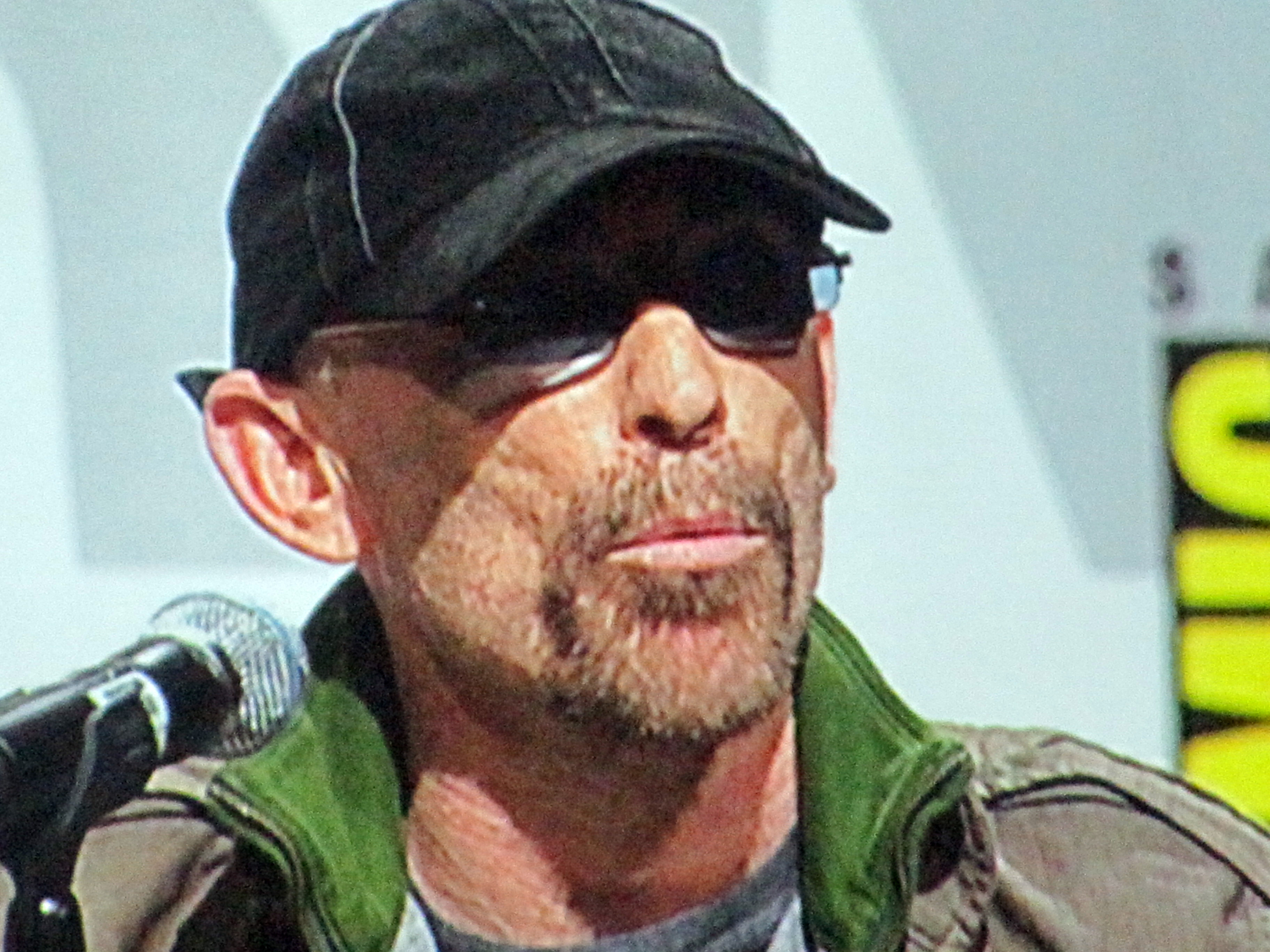
Jackie Earle Haley, Best Supporting Actor winner

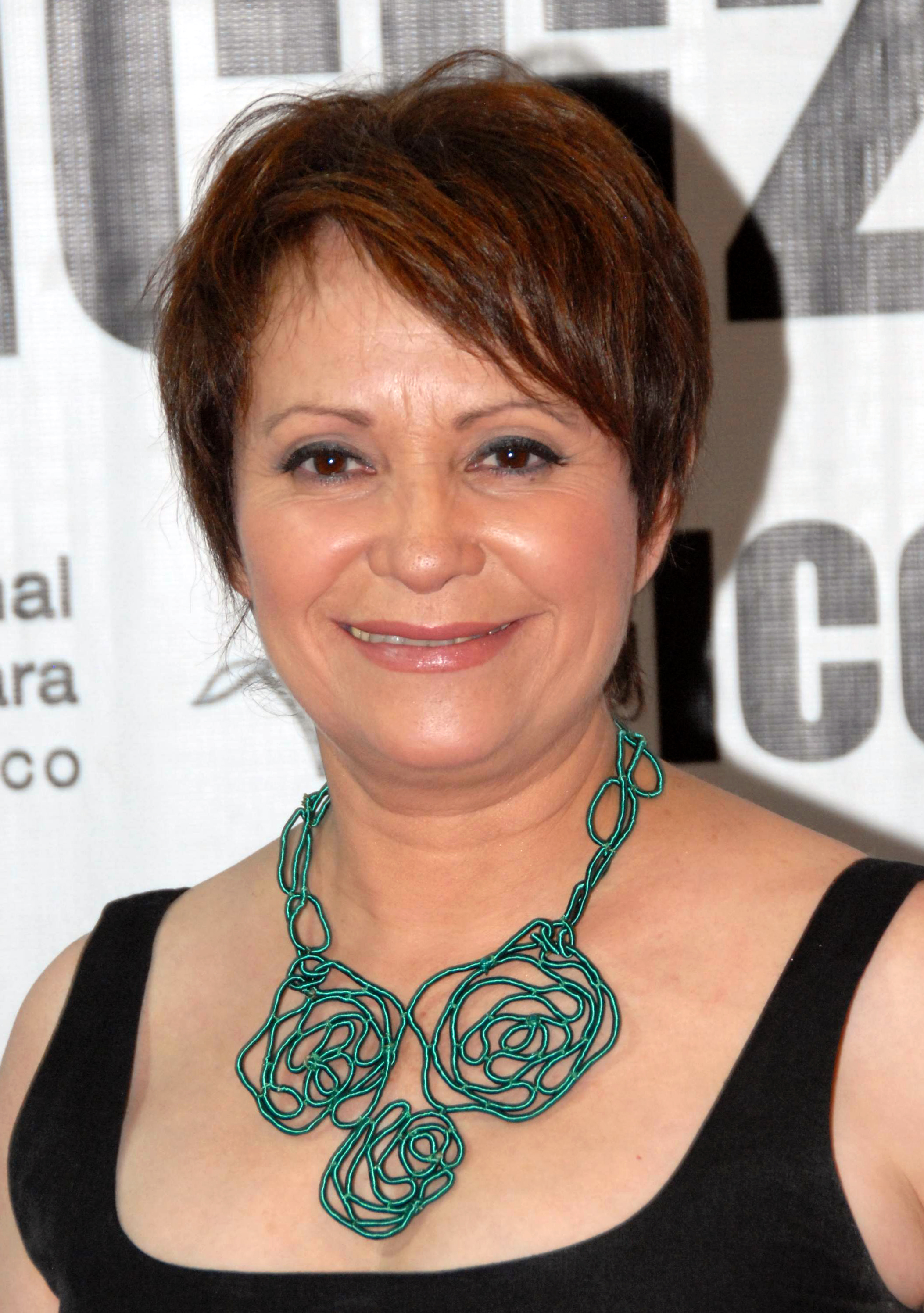
Adriana Barraza, Best Supporting Actress winner

- Best Picture:
  - Little Children
- Best Director:
  - Paul Greengrass - United 93
- Best Original Screenplay:
  - Brick - Rian Johnson
- Best Adapted Screenplay:
  - Little Children - Todd Field and Tom Perrotta
- Best Actor:
  - Sacha Baron Cohen - Borat
- Best Actress:
  - Helen Mirren - The Queen
- Best Supporting Actor:
  - Jackie Earle Haley - Little Children
- Best Supporting Actress:
  - Adriana Barraza - Babel
- Best Foreign Language Film:
  - Pan's Labyrinth (El laberinto del fauno) • Mexico/Spain/United States
- Best Documentary:
  - An Inconvenient Truth
- Marlon Riggs Award (for courage & vision in the Bay Area film community):
  - Stephen Salmons, co-founder and artistic director of the San Francisco Silent Film Festival
- Special Citation (in honor of Arthur Lazere, a member of the critics group and founder of culturevulture.net who died earlier this year):
  - The Death of Mr. Lazarescu (Moartea domnului Lãzãrescu)
