= Josh Wilker =

American writer

Josh Wilker is an American writer. He is best known for his 2010 book, Cardboard Gods: An All-American Tale Told Through Baseball Cards. He operates the Cardboard Gods website.

He has contributed to the Los Angeles Review of Books, HuffPost, and Vice.

Wilker was the 2015 winner of the Howard Frank Mosher Short Fiction Prize.

== Books ==
Cardboard Gods was inspired in part by Frederick Exley's A Fan's Notes. It received positive reviews, with Spitball Magazine writing that "Wilker moves us beyond baseball cards as monetary investment to place us inside his Transcendentalist-esque realization of their ability to transcend time and make tangible a golden age of childhood." It was nominated for a Casey Award.

In addition to numerous books for children, Wilker is the author of The Bad News Bears in Breaking Training, about the 1977 sequel, and Benchwarmer: A Sports-Obsessed Memoir of Fatherhood, a memoir of sports and parenting. Kirkus Reviews called Benchwarmer "honest, relatable and humorous—an indispensable read for fathers (and sons) whose joy in life comes not from winning the big game but being alive to witness the beauty of its happening."

== Selected bibliography ==
- Cardboard Gods: An All-American Tale Told Through Baseball Cards (2010)
- The Bad News Bears in Breaking Training (2011)
- Benchwarmer: A Sports-Obsessed Memoir of Fatherhood (2015)
