= 2006 New York Film Critics Circle Awards =

72nd New York Film Critics Circle Awards

72nd NYFCC Awards

January 7, 2007

Best Film:
United 93

The 72nd New York Film Critics Circle Awards, honoring the best in film for 2006, were announced on 11 December 2006 and presented on 7 January 2007.

== Winners ==
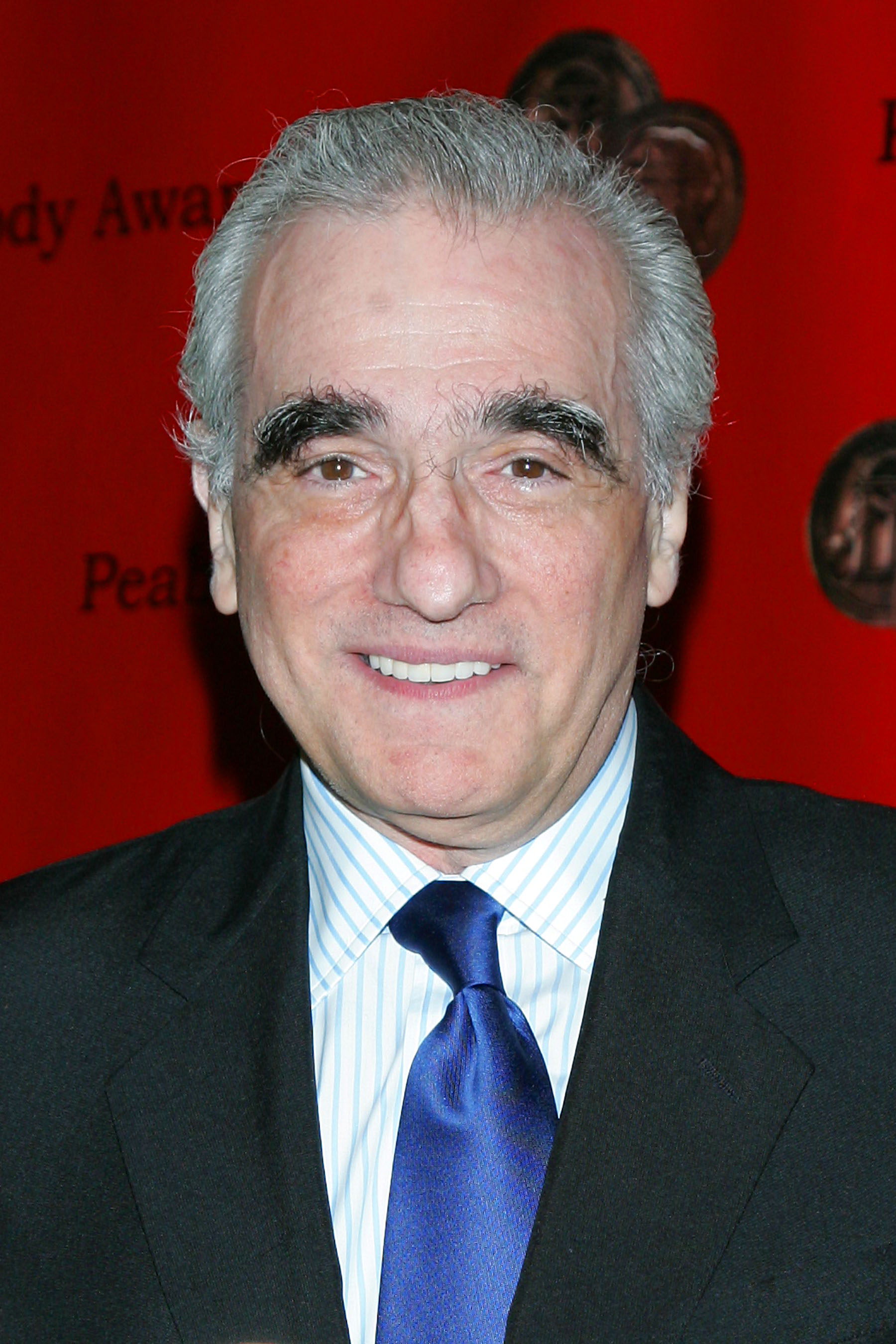
Martin Scorsese, Best Director winner

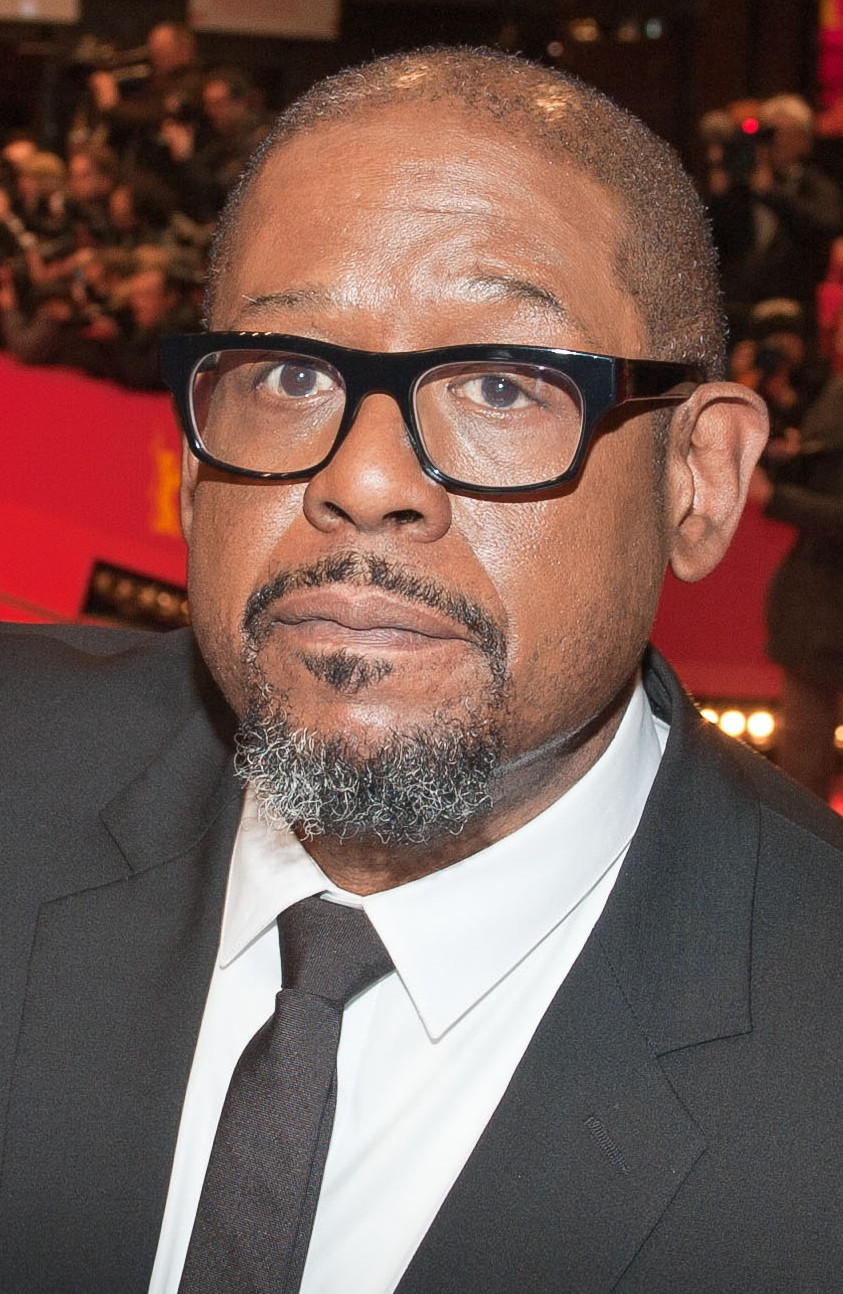
Forest Whitaker, Best Actor winner

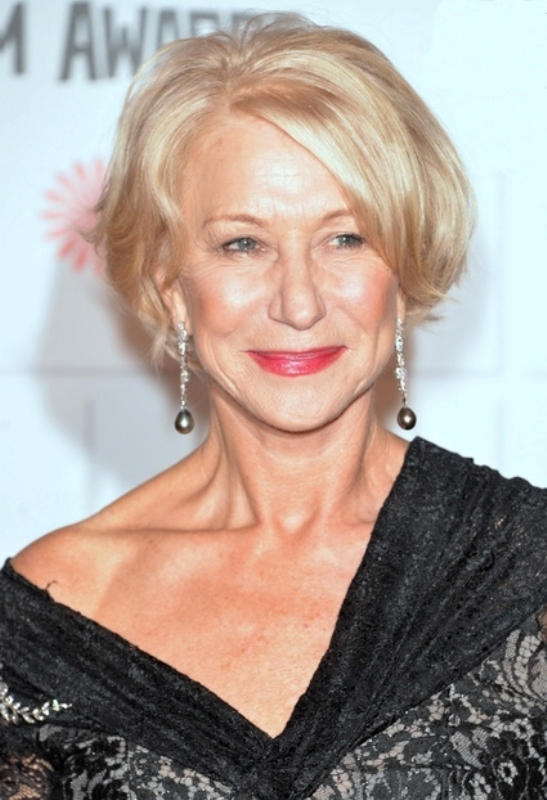
Helen Mirren, Best Actress winner

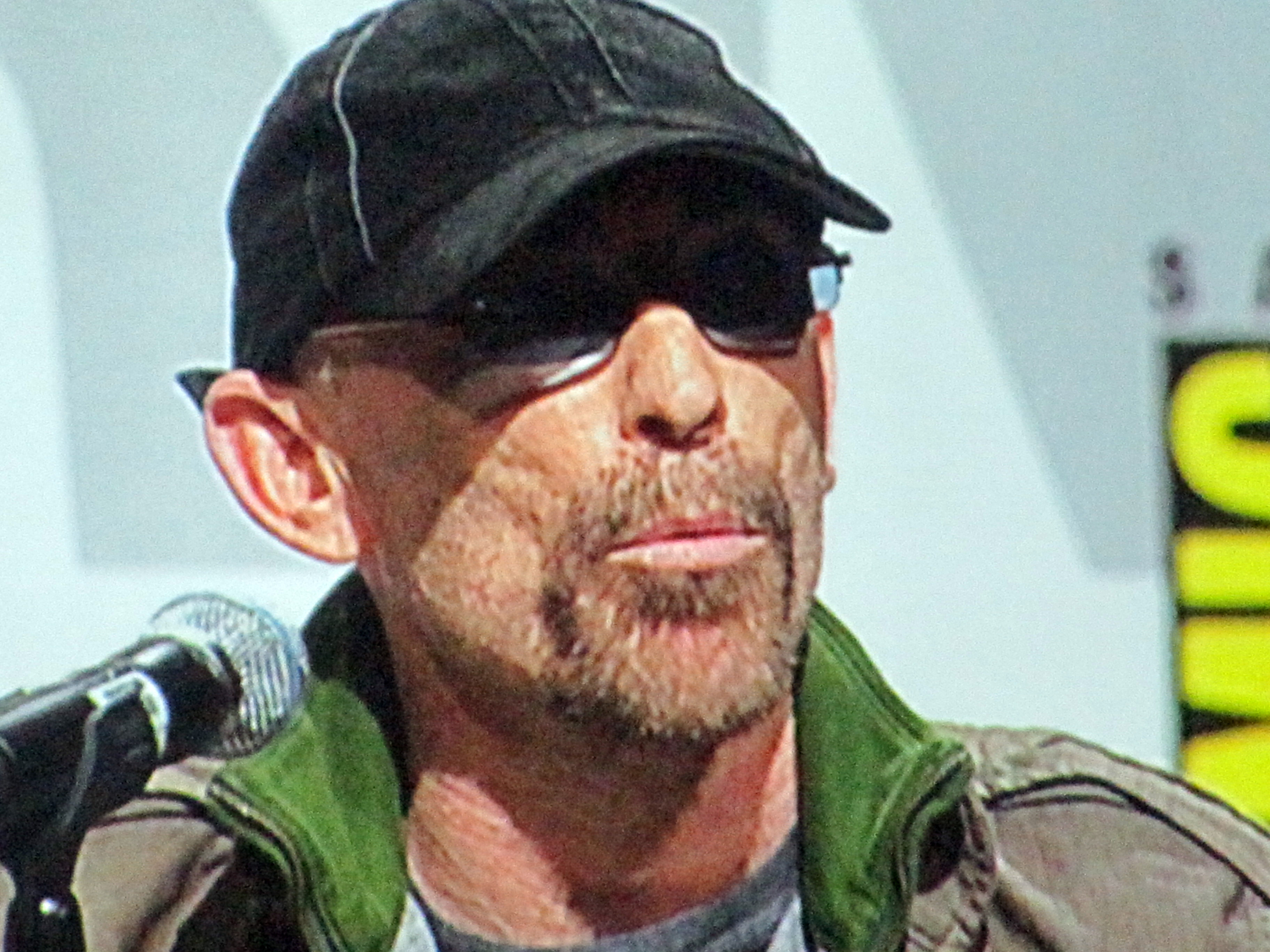
Jackie Earle Haley, Best Supporting Actor winner

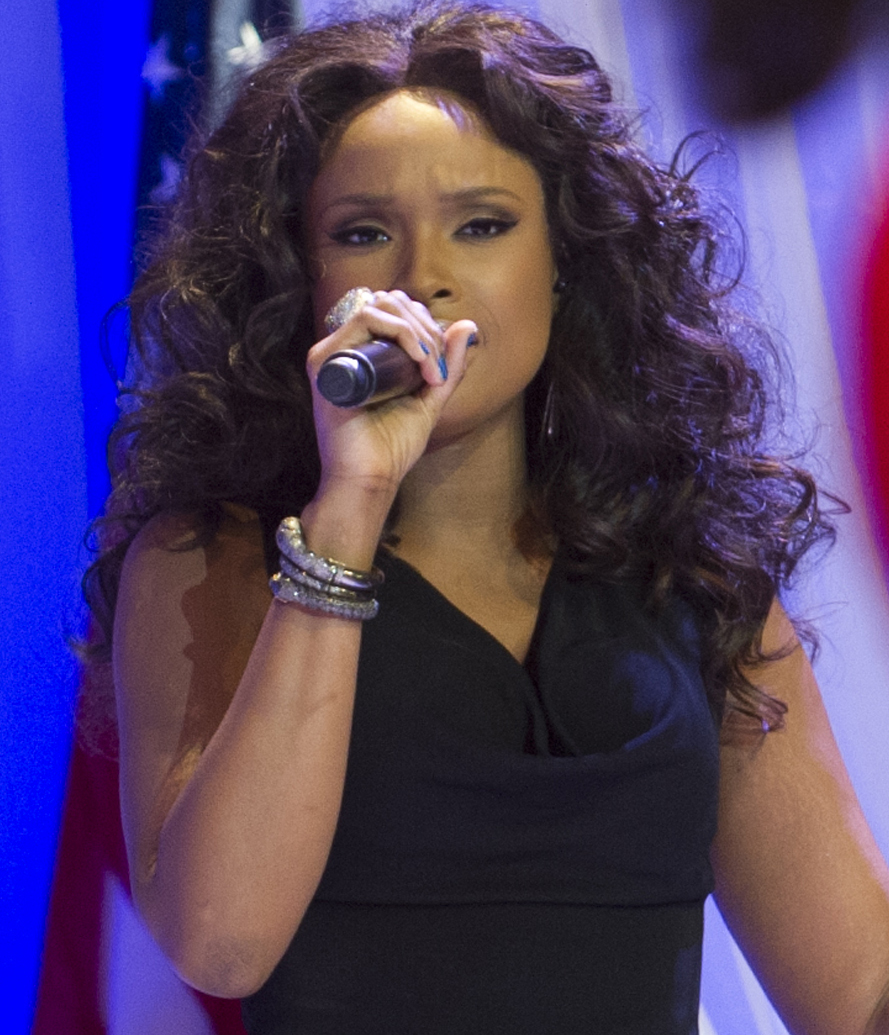
Jennifer Hudson, Best Supporting Actress winner

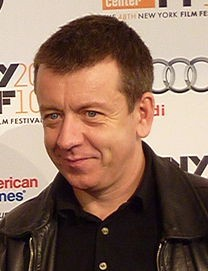
Peter Morgan, Best Screenplay winner

- Best Actor:
  - Forest Whitaker – The Last King of Scotland
  - Runners-up: Ryan Gosling – Half Nelson and Sacha Baron Cohen – Borat: Cultural Learnings of America for Make Benefit Glorious Nation of Kazakhstan
- Best Actress:
  - Helen Mirren – The Queen
  - Runners-up: Judi Dench – Notes on a Scandal and Meryl Streep – The Devil Wears Prada
- Best Animated Feature:
  - Happy Feet
  - Runners-up: A Scanner Darkly and Cars
- Best Cinematography:
  - Guillermo Navarro – Pan's Labyrinth (El laberinto del fauno)
  - Runners-up: Xiaoding Zhao – Curse of the Golden Flower (Man cheng jin dai huang jin jia) and Emmanuel Lubezki – Children of Men
- Best Director:
  - Martin Scorsese – The Departed
  - Runners-up: Stephen Frears – The Queen and Clint Eastwood – Letters from Iwo Jima
- Best Film:
  - United 93
  - Runners-up: The Queen and The Departed
- Best First Film:
  - Ryan Fleck – Half Nelson
  - Runners-up: Jonathan Dayton and Valerie Faris – Little Miss Sunshine and Dito Montiel – A Guide to Recognizing Your Saints
- Best Foreign Language Film:
  - Army of Shadows (L'armée des ombres) • France/Italy
  - Runners-up: Volver • Spain and The Death of Mr. Lazarescu (Moartea domnului Lăzărescu) • Romania
- Best Non-Fiction Film:
  - Deliver Us from Evil
  - Runners-up: 49 Up, Borat: Cultural Learnings of America for Make Benefit Glorious Nation of Kazakhstan, and An Inconvenient Truth
- Best Screenplay:
  - Peter Morgan – The Queen
  - Runners-up: William Monahan – The Departed and Michael Arndt – Little Miss Sunshine
- Best Supporting Actor:
  - Jackie Earle Haley – Little Children
  - Runners-up: Eddie Murphy – Dreamgirls and Steve Carell – Little Miss Sunshine
- Best Supporting Actress:
  - Jennifer Hudson – Dreamgirls
  - Runners-up: Shareeka Epps – Half Nelson and Catherine O'Hara – For Your Consideration
