= The Bad News Bears =

1976 film

- Theatrical release poster by Jack Davis
- Directed by: Michael Ritchie
- Written by: Bill Lancaster
- Produced by: Stanley R. Jaffe
- Starring: Walter Matthau; Tatum O'Neal; Vic Morrow
- Cinematography: John A. Alonzo
- Edited by: Richard A. Harris
- Music by: Jerry Fielding
- Distributed by: Paramount Pictures
- Release date: April 7, 1976
- Running time: 102 minutes
- Country: United States
- Languages: English; Spanish
- Budget: $9 million
- Box office: $42.3 million

The Bad News Bears is a 1976 American sports comedy film directed by Michael Ritchie and written by Bill Lancaster. It stars Walter Matthau as alcoholic ex-baseball pitcher Morris Buttermaker who becomes a coach for a youth baseball team known as the Bears. The film's cast includes Tatum O'Neal, Vic Morrow, Joyce Van Patten, Ben Piazza, Jackie Earle Haley, and Alfred W. Lutter. Its score, composed by Jerry Fielding, adapts the principal themes of Georges Bizet's opera Carmen.

Released by Paramount Pictures on April 7, 1976, The Bad News Bears received generally positive reviews. It was followed by two sequels, The Bad News Bears in Breaking Training in 1977 and The Bad News Bears Go to Japan in 1978, a short-lived 1979–80 CBS television series, and a 2005 remake.

== Plot ==
Morris Buttermaker, an alcoholic pool cleaner and former minor-league baseball pitcher, accepts a secretive cash payment from lawyer Bob Whitewood to coach his son Toby's youth baseball league expansion team, the Bears. The team is made up of unskilled players, formed as a settlement to a lawsuit brought against the league for excluding such players from other teams. Shunned by the more competitive teams (and their competitive parents and coaches), the Bears are considered outsiders and the least talented team in the Southern California league.

Buttermaker makes little effort to help the boys improve, accomplishing nothing before their first game except for finding a sponsor to provide uniforms. He forfeits the opening game after the Bears allow 26 runs without recording an out.

With the entire team wanting to quit due to the humiliation of their first loss, Buttermaker begins to take his coaching more seriously, teaching basics like hitting, fielding and sliding. In addition, he recruits two unlikely prospects: sharp-tongued Amanda Whurlizer, the 11-year-old daughter of Buttermaker's former girlfriend and a skilled pitcher (trained by Buttermaker when she was younger); and the local cigarette-smoking, loan-sharking, Harley-Davidson-riding troublemaker Kelly Leak, who is also the best athlete in the area but has been excluded from playing in the past due to his juvenile delinquency. With Amanda and Kelly on board, the team gains confidence and they begin to win. The strained past relationship between Buttermaker and Amanda is revealed as the team improves.

Eventually, the Bears make it to the championship game opposite the top-notch Yankees, who are coached by aggressive, competitive Roy Turner. As the game progresses, tensions rise between the teams and the coaches, as Buttermaker and Turner engage in ruthless behavior toward each other and the players in their fervor to win the game. But when Turner strikes his son Joey, the pitcher, for ignoring his orders and intentionally throwing at the batter Mike Engelberg's head, Joey retaliates by holding on to a comebacker until the Bears runner scores, then walks off the field.

Buttermaker realizes that he, too, has placed too much emphasis on winning, and puts in his bench-warmers to allow everyone to play. The Bears lose in the end, but despite Buttermaker's move, they nearly win the game. After the trophy award ceremony, Buttermaker gives the team beer, which they spray on each other in a celebration as if they had won, telling the Yankees "where [they] can put their championship trophy".

== Cast ==
Top-billed, shown in the opening credits, are Matthau, O'Neal and Morrow.

=== Adults ===
- Walter Matthau as Morris Buttermaker, coach of the Bears: A drunken, loud, ex-professional baseball pitcher and part-time pool cleaner, who drives a rundown green Cadillac convertible.
- Vic Morrow as Roy Turner, coach of the Yankees, who is competitive and aggressive.
- Joyce Van Patten as Cleveland, league manager, who favors Roy and the Yankees.
- Ben Piazza as Bob Whitewood, city councilman and lawyer who sued the league to allow the Bears (in particular, his son) to play, and who convinces (and pays) Buttermaker to coach the team.
- Shari Summers as Mrs. Turner, wife of Roy Turner, coach of the Yankees, and supportive mother of Joey Turner.

=== Children ===
- Tatum O'Neal as Amanda Whurlizer, the 11-year-old star pitcher for the Bears who feels insecure about her tomboy image. She is recruited by Buttermaker to help the team start winning. She is no-nonsense and a great pitcher who was taught by Buttermaker when she was young. The boys grow to be very protective of her, picking a fight with their rivals during the championship game when Amanda is kicked in the chest. Her mother is Buttermaker's ex-girlfriend, and Amanda looks to him as a father figure. Amanda and Tanner often butt heads but respect each other. She also has a secret crush on Kelly.
- Chris Barnes as Tanner Boyle, the short-tempered shortstop with a Napoleon complex; after suffering a horrible loss in their first game, he picks a fight with the entire seventh grade from the boys' middle school (and loses). He tends to curse more than the others, and initially insults and bullies Timmy before realizing that he is treating Timmy no better than the kids from their rival team. He becomes protective of Timmy, leading to an unlikely friendship between them. He is also close friends with Ahmad.
- Jackie Earle Haley as Kelly Leak, the local troublemaker who smokes and rides a mini Harley-Davidson motorcycle. Kelly is also the best athlete in the neighborhood. At first, he does not want to join the team when Amanda attempts to recruit him, but he changes his mind when Coach Turner threatens him. He alternates between left and center field, and has a crush on Amanda. After joining the team, he forms close friendships with Tanner, Ahmad and Ogilvie.
- Erin Blunt as Ahmad Abdul-Rahim, who plays in the outfield, is liked by everyone on the team and adores Hank Aaron; Ahmad strips off his uniform in shame after committing several errors in the Bears' first game, but is convinced to return to the team by Buttermaker, and is often used for bunts due to his speed. He is shown to be close friends with Tanner, and often has to pull Tanner away from fights.
- Gary Lee Cavagnaro as Mike Engelberg, an overweight boy who plays catcher; a great hitter, he frequently teases Tanner about his size. He breaks Buttermaker's windshield with a baseball at the first practice. He has a deep rivalry with Yankee pitcher Joey, causing them to throw insults at each other.
- Alfred W. Lutter as Alfred Ogilvie, a bookworm who memorizes baseball statistics. He is mostly a bench-warmer who assists Buttermaker with defensive strategy. A backup outfielder and first baseman, but reluctant to play because he feels that he is one of the lesser-skilled players on the team.
- David Stambaugh as Toby Whitewood, an unassuming boy who plays first base. He knows about the other players' personalities, is intelligent and well-spoken, and occasionally speaks on behalf of the team. He is the son of councilman Bob Whitewood, who secretly paid Buttermaker to coach the team.
- Quinn Smith as Timmy Lupus, initially described by Tanner as a "booger-eating spaz", plays right field and is considered to be the worst player on the team—if not the entire league—but he surprises everyone in the championship game by making a key play to keep the Bears in the game. He is the most quiet and shy player, but shows the ability to prepare a martini for Coach Buttermaker while the team is assisting him with cleaning pools.
- Jaime Escobedo as Jose Aguilar, Miguel's older brother who plays second base and does not speak English.
- George Gonzales as Miguel Aguilar, Jose's younger brother who plays mostly right field and does not speak English. He is so short that the strike zone is practically nonexistent.
- David Pollock as Rudi Stein, a nervous relief pitcher with glasses who is a terrible hitter. At times, he is asked by Coach Buttermaker to purposely get hit by pitches to get on base. He is also a backup outfielder.
- Brett Marx as Jimmy Feldman, a fairly quiet third baseman with curly blond hair.
- Scott Firestone as Regi Tower, a fairly quiet, red-headed infielder whose father vocally attends practices and games. He plays first base.
- Brandon Cruz as Joey Turner, the star pitcher for the Yankees and coach Roy Turner's son. He has a rivalry with Engelberg and regularly bullies Tanner and Timmy. He nearly beans Engelberg, which results in his father slapping him. In response, Joey holds a ground ball that Engelberg hits to him, allowing an inside-the-park home run. He drops the ball at his father's feet and quits the team.

== Production ==
The Bad News Bears was filmed in and around Los Angeles, primarily in the San Fernando Valley. The field where they played is in Mason Park on Mason Avenue in Chatsworth. In the film, the Bears were sponsored by an actual local company, "Chico's Bail Bonds". One scene was filmed in the council chamber at Los Angeles City Hall.

Walter Matthau was paid $750,000 plus over 10% of the theatrical rentals. Tatum O'Neal was paid $350,000 plus a percentage of the profits. These were later estimated to be $1.9 million.

== Reception ==
Rotten Tomatoes gives the film a score of 90%, based on reviews from 105 critics. The site's critical consensus reads, "The Bad News Bears is rude, profane, and cynical, but shot through with honest, unforced humor, and held together by a deft, understated performance from Walter Matthau."

In his 1976 review, critic Roger Ebert of the Chicago Sun-Times gave the film three stars out of four, and called it "an unblinking, scathing look at competition in American society".

Gene Siskel of the Chicago Tribune awarded two-and-a-half stars out of four, calling the film's characters "more types than people" and the kids' foul-mouth dialogue "overdone", although he found O'Neal's performance "genuinely affecting".

Variety called it "the funniest adult-child comedy film since Paper Moon", and lauded the "excellent" script.

Kevin Thomas of the Los Angeles Times declared it "the best American screen comedy of the year to date", adding, "Bright, pugnacious and utterly realistic as most children seem to be today, these kids are drawn with much accuracy and are played beautifully."

Vincent Canby of The New York Times found the film only "occasionally funny", but praised screenwriter Bill Lancaster for "the talent and discipline to tell the story of The Bad News Bears almost completely in terms of what happens on the baseball diamond or in the dugout".

Gary Arnold of The Washington Post praised it as "a lively, spontaneously funny entertainment" that "could rally a large parallel audience seeking less innocuous and stereotyped pictures with and about children".

Tom Milne of The Monthly Film Bulletin called it "miraculously funny and entirely delightful".

It's so funny. It's so sweet. It's sweet and, yet, it's completely wrong. It's just so wrong on so many levels. — Tatum O'Neal

=== Awards ===
Walter Matthau was nominated jointly for this film and his work in The Sunshine Boys for the BAFTA Award for Best Actor at the 30th British Academy Film Awards. The screenplay by Bill Lancaster, son of actor Burt Lancaster, was awarded Best Comedy Written Directly for the Screen at the 29th Writers Guild of America Awards.

== See also ==
- The Bad News Bears (TV series)
- List of baseball films
