= Dolph Sweet =

American actor (1920–1985)

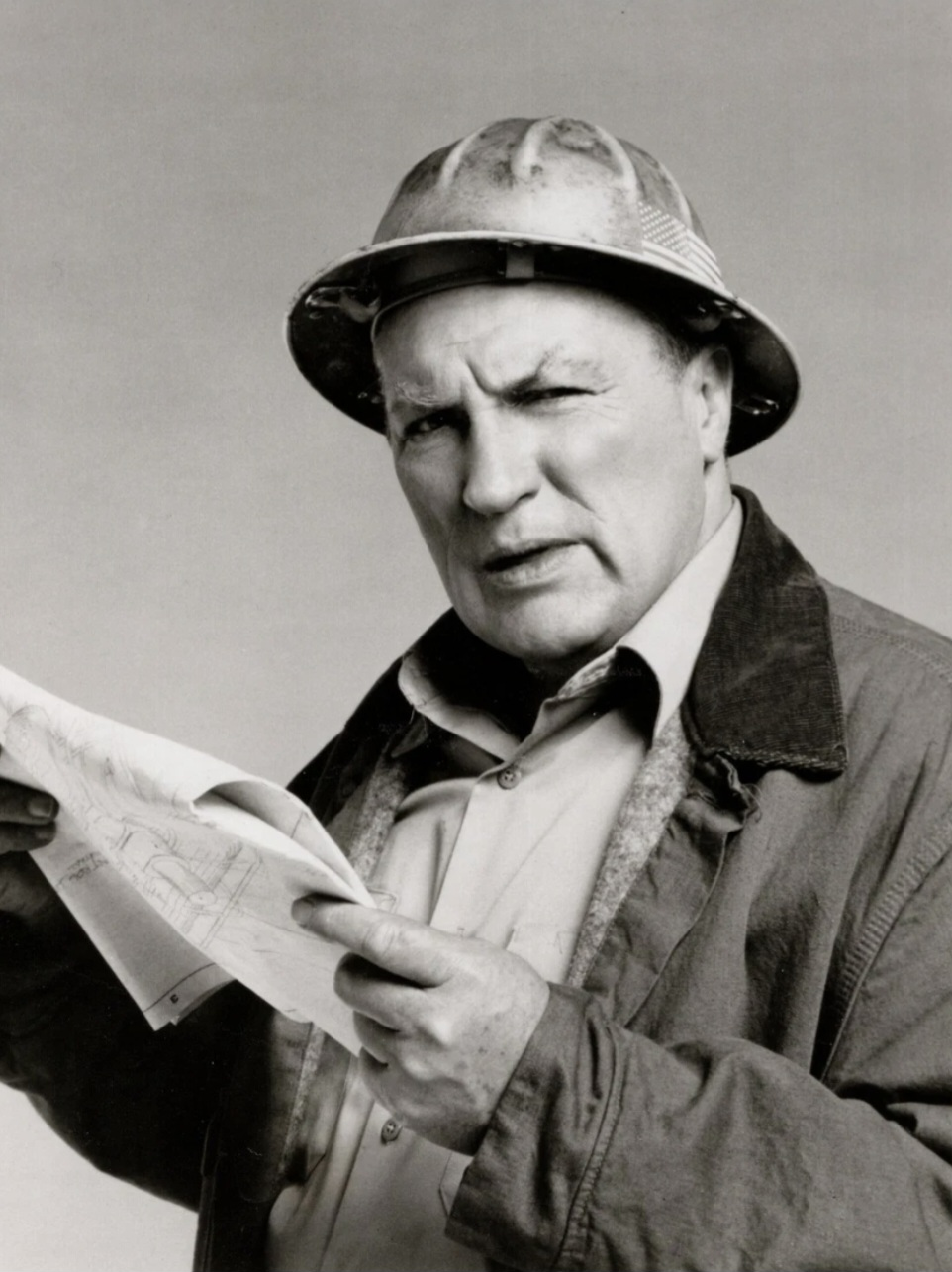
- Sweet in 1980
- Born: Adolphus Jean Sweet; July 18, 1920; New York City, New York, U.S.
- Died: May 8, 1985 (aged 64); Tarzana, California, U.S.
- Occupation: Actor
- Years active: 1961–1985
- Spouses: Reba Gillespie (div. 1973) Iris Braun (m. 1974)
- Children: 1

Adolphus Jean Sweet (July 18, 1920 – May 8, 1985) was an American actor credited with nearly 60 television and film roles and more than 50 roles in stage productions, including performances on Broadway. He often played policemen throughout his career, and may be best known for his portrayal of police chief and father Carl Kanisky on the sitcom Gimme a Break! from 1981 until his death in May 1985.

== Early life ==
Sweet was born in New York City. In 1939, he attended the University of Alabama but interrupted his studies to serve a tour of duty in World War II with the 44th Bombardment Group (Heavy) of the Eighth Air Force as a second lieutenant and navigator on B-24 Liberator bomber aircraft. His plane was downed over Romania during Operation Tidal Wave and he subsequently spent two years as a prisoner of war. He joined other prisoners in staffing short plays in the camp, sparking his interest in acting when he returned from the war.

After the war, he played semi-professional football and boxed while earning his master's degree in English and comparative drama from Columbia University.

== Career ==
Upon graduation, Sweet took a teaching job at Barnard College, rising to head of the drama department during his 12 years at the college. He left his teaching duties shortly after making his Broadway debut at age 40 in a 1961 production of Rhinoceros, starring Zero Mostel.

Sweet landed his first major film role in The Young Doctors (1961). He made appearances in films such as You're a Big Boy Now (1966), A Lovely Way to Die (1968), The Swimmer (1968) and Finian's Rainbow (1968). He also performed on television through the 1960s and 1970s, including roles on The Defenders, The Edge of Night, Another World and Dark Shadows.

Through the 1970s, Sweet took roles in films such as Colossus: The Forbin Project (1970), The Out-of-Towners (1970), The New Centurions (1972), Fear Is the Key (1972), Sisters (1972), Cops and Robbers (1973), The Lords of Flatbush (1974), Amazing Grace (1974), The Bad News Bears in Breaking Training (1977), Which Way Is Up? (1977), Go Tell the Spartans (1978), Heaven Can Wait (1978) and The Wanderers (1979). He also had guest-starring roles on Little House on the Prairie and Mrs. Columbo. He had a notable role as FBI director J. Edgar Hoover in the 1978 television miniseries King, based on the life of Martin Luther King Jr.

As the 1980s began, Sweet worked steadily in films such as Below the Belt (1980) and Reds (1981), the made-for-television movie Gideon's Trumpet (1980) and television series such as Hill Street Blues and Hart to Hart.

Sweet had a recurring role as a policeman in the single 1965–66 season of the legal drama/comedy The Trials of O'Brien. He was also known for his recurring role as policeman Gil McGowan on the soap opera Another World (1972–1977). Sweet also voiced the character of transit-police captain Costello in the 1974 film The Taking of Pelham One Two Three.

Sweet's best-known television character was police chief and father Carl Kanisky, employer of housekeeper Nell Carter, on the sitcom Gimme a Break!. Sweet appeared in this role from 1981 until his death.

Sweet underwent unsuccessful abdominal surgery in the summer of 1984 and was diagnosed with stomach cancer during the fourth season of Gimme a Break, but he continued to work. The final episode of the fourth season aired on May 11, 1985, three days after he died, and just a few hours after his funeral.

== Personal life ==
Sweet married Reba Gillespie while pursuing his master's degree after World War II. The couple had a son together, Jonathon (born c. 1952), before they divorced in 1973. In 1974, Sweet married Iris Braun.

Sweet died from stomach cancer at Tarzana Hospital in Tarzana, California, on May 8, 1985, survived by his wife and son. His Gimme a Break! co-star, Nell Carter, gave the eulogy at his funeral on May 11, and recorded a short eulogy to air that same night, at the start of the show's final episode for the season. Sweet's remains were cremated and his ashes were scattered at sea.

== Filmography ==
Year	Title	Role	Notes
1961	The Young Doctors	Police Car Driver	
1966	You're a Big Boy Now	Patrolman Francis Graf	
1967–1968	The Edge of Night	Harry Constable	
1968	A Lovely Way to Die	Captain Haver	
1968	The Swimmer	Henry Biswanger	
1968	Finian's Rainbow	Sheriff	
1969	The Lost Man	Police Captain	
1970	Colossus: The Forbin Project	Missile Commander	
1970	The Out-of-Towners	Police Sergeant	
1971	The Telephone Book	Obscene-Caller	
1972–1977	Another World	Gil McGowan	
1972	The New Centurions	Sergeant Runyon	
1972	Sisters	Detective Kelly	
1972	Fear Is the Key	Jablonsky	
1973	Cops and Robbers	George	
1974	The Lords of Flatbush	Mr. Rosiello	
1974	Amazing Grace	Mayor Scott	
1974	The Taking of Pelham One Two Three	Police Captain Costello	Uncredited voice
1977	The Bad News Bears in Breaking Training	Mr. Manning	
1977	Which Way Is Up?	The Boss	
1978	Go Tell the Spartans	General Harnitz	
1978	Heaven Can Wait	Head coach	
1978	Angie	The Sheriff	
1978	Little House on the Prairie	Mr Swaggart	
1979	The Wanderers	"Chubby" Galasso	
1980	Below the Belt	LeRoi	
1980	When the Whistle Blows	Norm Jenkins	
1981	Reds	Bill "Big Bill" Haywood	
1981	Hart to Hart	Ed Perkins	
1981–1985	Gimme a Break!	Carl Kanisky	
