= Bad News Bears =

2005 American film by Richard Linklater

- Theatrical release poster
- Directed by: Richard Linklater
- Screenplay by: Glenn Ficarra; John Requa
- Based on: The Bad News Bears by Bill Lancaster
- Produced by: Richard Linklater; J. Geyer Kosinski
- Starring: Billy Bob Thornton; Greg Kinnear; Marcia Gay Harden
- Cinematography: Rogier Stoffers
- Edited by: Sandra Adair
- Music by: Ed Shearmur
- Production companies: Media Talent Group; Detour Filmproduction
- Distributed by: Paramount Pictures
- Release date: July 22, 2005
- Running time: 114 minutes
- Country: United States
- Language: English
- Budget: $35 million
- Box office: $34.3 million

Bad News Bears is a 2005 American sports comedy film co-produced and directed by Richard Linklater, written by Glenn Ficarra and John Requa, and starring Billy Bob Thornton, Greg Kinnear, and Marcia Gay Harden. It is a remake of the 1976 sports film The Bad News Bears. Bad News Bears was released by Paramount Pictures on July 22, 2005. Unlike the original film, it received mixed reviews and grossed just $34.3 million against its $35 million budget.

== Plot ==
Morris Buttermaker is a washed-up alcoholic baseball player who was a pitcher for the Seattle Mariners before getting kicked out of professional baseball for attacking an umpire. He works as an exterminator and is a crude womanizer. He is hired by Liz Whitewood to coach the Bears, a children's baseball team with poor playing skills. They play their first game and do not even make an out before he forfeits the game. The entire team decides to quit afterwards, but Buttermaker dissuades them from quitting and promises to be a better coach.

Amanda Whurlitzer, a skilled pitcher, is the 12-year-old daughter of one of his ex-girlfriends. After a couple requests, she decides to join the team. Kelly Leak, a local troublemaker but solid hitter, also joins the team, and the Bears start winning games. Before the championship game Liz congratulates Buttermaker on his success, which leads to them sleeping together, which Toby, her son and a player on the team discovers by accident. The Bears eventually make it to the championship game. In the middle of that game, the Bears and Yankees fight after Amanda is shoved during a play at the plate. A few innings later the Yankees coach Ray Bullock orders his son Joey to intentionally walk Mike Engleberg, one of the Bears' best hitters. Instead of walking him, he almost hits Engleberg, causing Ray to push Joey to the ground in anger. As revenge, Joey throws Engleberg an easy pitch which he smacks for a home run and leaves the game with his mother Shari. Later, Buttermaker changes the lineup, putting the benchwarmers in and taking out some of the good players which causes the Bears to fall behind heading into the last half of the inning. With two outs, one of the Bears players, Garo Daragabrigadien, drives in two runs and tries to score to tie the game but is thrown out at the plate on a close call, causing the Bears to lose the championship 8–7.

After the game, Buttermaker gives them non-alcoholic beer, and they spray it all over each other. Although they did not win the championship, they have the satisfaction of trying, knowing that winning is not so important.

== Cast ==
- Billy Bob Thornton as Morris Buttermaker (the coach of Team Bears)
- Greg Kinnear as Ray Bullock (the coach of Team Yankees)
- Marcia Gay Harden as Liz Whitewood
- Ridge Canipe as Toby Whitewood, Liz's son (the #13 of Team Bears)
- Brandon Craggs as Mike Engelberg (the #20 of Team Bears)
- Jeffrey Davies as Kelly Leak, Amanda's love interest (the #5 Team Bears from New Recruit)
- Timmy Deters as Tanner Boyle (the #3 of Team Bears)
- Carlos Estrada as Miguel Agilar, Jose's identical twin brother (the #14 of Team Bears)
- Emmanuel Estrada as Jose Agilar, Miguel's identical twin brother (the #17 of Team Bears)
- Troy Gentile as Matthew Hooper (the #8 of Team Bears)
- Kenneth "K.C." Harris as Ahmad Abdul Rahim (the #25 of Team Bears)
- Aman Johal as Prem Lahiri (the #19 of Team Bears)
- Tyler Patrick Jones as Timmy Lupus (the #4 of Team Bears)
- Sammi Kane Kraft as Amanda Whurlitzer (the #7 of Team Bears from New Recruit)
- Jeffrey Tedmori as Garo Daragabrigadien (the #10 of Team Bears)
- Arabella Holzbog as Shari Bullock, Ray's wife
- Carter Jenkins as Joey Bullock, Ray & Shari's son
- Sonya Eddy as Saleslady

== Release ==
Bad News Bears opened on July 22, 2005, and it ranked #5 at the North American domestic box office with $11,382,472. The film ultimately earned $32,868,349 in North America and $1,384,498 internationally for a worldwide total of $34,252,847, becoming a box office bomb.

== Critical response ==
Bad News Bears received mixed reviews from critics. Review aggregation website Rotten Tomatoes gives the film an approval rating of 48% based on 164 reviews, with an average rating of 5.70/10. The site's critical consensus reads: "This too-faithful remake aims low for laughs, turning off the easily offendable; despite another lovably irascible contribution by Thornton, it lacks the ensemble strength and originality of the 1976 version". Metacritic gives the film a score of 65 out of 100, based on 35 critics, indicating "generally favorable" reviews. On CinemaScore, audiences gave the film an average grade of "B" on an A+ to F scale.

Roger Ebert of the Chicago Sun-Times gave the film three stars out of four, praising Billy Bob Thornton's performance in particular: "The movie is like a merger of [Thornton's] ugly drunk in Bad Santa and his football coach in Friday Night Lights, yet [he] doesn't recycle from either movie; he modulates the manic anger of the Santa and the intensity of the coach and produces a morose loser who we like better than he likes himself". James Berardinelli of ReelViews also gave Bad News Bears three stars out of four, calling it "an entertaining motion picture" that "won't make fans forget the original, but it's not so feeble that it disappears into the earlier movie's shadow".

Giving the film two stars out of five, Don R. Lewis of Film Threat said that it has "a few laughs" but that it "just trudges on, going through the motions of the original with no spark" and that it "suffer[s] from the unbearable, crushing weight of political correctness". Paula Nechak of the Seattle Post-Intelligencer called the film "simply another in a long line of utterly unnecessary remakes that, having nothing new to say, clutch at crassness and dumbness", while Mick LaSalle of the San Francisco Chronicle said that while "the screenplay [...] makes the most of Thornton's dry, skewed humor, [...] nothing happens here that would distinguish this film from other sports movies".

== Legacy ==
In a case of life imitating art, in 2012, a Los Angeles–area little league in financial difficulty received a donation from the owner of a local strip club in order to continue operating. Comparisons were immediately made to a scene in Bad News Bears in which the team received a donation from "Bo-Peeps Gentlemen's Club" and is required to put the logo of the strip club on their uniforms. The real-life club did not require similar stipulations, preferring to donate anonymously. However, local civic leaders encouraged that the club in question be made public so that they could get the proper recognition they deserved.

== See also ==
- List of baseball films
