= Brett Marx =

American actor and producer

- Born: December 26, 1964 (age 61); Los Angeles, California, U.S.
- Years active: 1976-1995

Brett Marx (born December 26, 1964) is an American movie and television actor and producer who appeared as Jimmy Feldman in the Bad News Bears movies.

== Biography ==
Marx was born in Los Angeles, California. He graduated from North Hollywood High School.

He has appeared on television, in one episode each of Tales from the Darkside, My Two Dads and Party of Five. In 1981, he was nominated for a Genie Award for Best Performance by a Foreign Actor in The Lucky Star.

Today, Marx is a commercial and film producer. He is married and has two children.

== Filmography ==
Year	Title	Role	Notes
1976	The Bad News Bears	Jimmy Feldman	
1977	Something for Joey	Joey's Teammate	TV movie
1977	The Bad News Bears in Breaking Training	Jimmie Feldman	
1978	The Bad News Bears Go to Japan	Jimmie Feldman	
1980	The Lucky Star	David Goldberg	
1986	Thrashin'	Bozo	
1987	Burglar	Dental Hygienist	
1988	Under the Boardwalk	Marone	
