= Arabella Holzbog =

American actress (born 1966)

- Born: Arabella Laura Holzbog; 1 October 1966 (age 60); Stroud, Gloucestershire, England
- Education: Pomona College (BA)
- Occupations: Actress, visual artist
- Years active: 1988–present
- Spouse: Daniel Ezralow (m. 1999)
- Children: 2

Arabella Laura Holzbog (born 1 October 1966) is a British-American actress and visual artist, occasionally credited as Arabella Tjye.

== Early life and education ==
Born in Stroud, Gloucestershire, England, Holzbog is the daughter of Thomas Jerald Holzbog, an American architect, by his marriage to the Anglo-Norwegian artist, Wendy-Ann Wilson, whose parents were the painter Frank Avray Wilson and his wife Ivy Higford Eckbo. They were married in Surrey in 1958, and had an older daughter, Jessica, born in Kensington in 1963.

Holzbog graduated from Pomona College with a first degree in art, then studied performance art and theatre at Riverside Studios in London. She went on to work as an actress in films, television, and on stage.

== Career ==
Holzbog appeared in episodes of Alias, Beyond Belief: Fact or Fiction, and Tales from the Crypt. She also appeared in the films Catalina Trust, Carnosaur 2, Stone Cold, Bad News Bears, and Across the Universe.

== Personal life ==
In 1995, Holzbog began to work with Daniel Ezralow, particularly on dance theatre projects, and they were married in 1999 and have two children.

== Filmography ==
=== Film ===
Year	Title	Role	Notes
1990	The Last Samurai	Caro	
1991	Stone Cold	Nancy	
1992	Soulmates	Sara Foster	
1995	Carnosaur 2	Sarah Rawlins	
1995	Hologram Man	Natalie	
1997	Cupid	Linda	
2000	Catalina Trust	Siobhan O'Riordan	
2002	Ocean Park	Ellen Thorne	
2005	Bad News Bears	Shari Bullock	
2007	Across the Universe	Prankster	

=== Television ===
Year	Title	Role	Notes
1991	Tales from the Crypt	Dead Corpse	Episode: "Easel Kill Ya"
1993	Riders	Helen Macaulay / Campbell-Black	Television film
1995	Red Shoe Diaries	Anna	Episode: "Tears"
1995	The Watcher	Kim	Episode: "Till There was You"
1996	Women: Stories of Passion	Young Madelaine	Episode: "As Always, Madelaine"
1997	Silk Stalkings	Janet Pearson	Episode: "A Question of Faith"
1997	L.A. Firefighters	Rebecca Hardy	Episode: "The Big One"
1998	Conan the Adventurer	Salea	Episode: "The Labyrinth"
1999, 2000	Beyond Belief: Fact or Fiction	Mrs. Woodward	2 episodes
2001	Alias	Laura Bristow	2 episodes
