= Chris Barnes (actor) =

American actor (b. 1965)

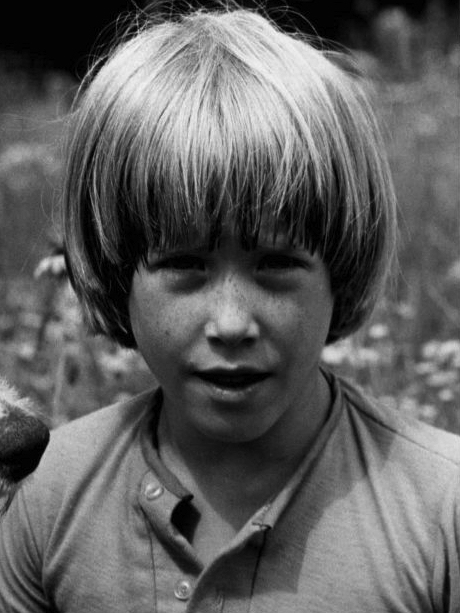
- Barnes, circa 1976
- Born: Christopher J. Barnes; June 24, 1965 (age 61); Los Angeles, California, U.S.
- Occupation: Actor
- Years active: 1976–1983

Christopher J. Barnes (born June 24, 1965) is an American former child actor.

== Career ==
Barnes began his professional film career at the age of 10. He is perhaps best known for his role as the short-tempered shortstop Tanner Boyle in the 1976 feature film.The Bad News Bears and its sequel The Bad News Bears in Breaking Training, as well as for appearing in several After School Specials during the late 1970s and early 1980s.

Barnes earned about $3,000 for his five weeks of work on the original Bad News Bears film, of which 25% was set aside in United States Savings Bonds under the terms of the California Child Actor's Bill (known colloquially as the Coogan Law), to ensure that a portion of his earnings would be available to him once he was an adult.

== Filmography ==
=== Movies ===
- The Bad News Bears (1976) - Tanner Boyle
- The Bad News Bears in Breaking Training (1977) - Tanner Boyle

=== Television ===
- Delvecchio (episode: "Contract for Harry") (1976) - Tommy Wilson
- NBC Special Treat (episode: Big Henry and the Polka Dot Kid) (1976) - Luke Baldwin
- Taxi (episode: "Memories of Cab 804, Part 1") (1978) - Kid
- Mom, the Wolfman and Me (1980) - Andrew
- Aloha Paradise (episode: "Catching Up") (1981) - Danny
- ABC Afterschool Special (episode: The Color of Friendship (1981) - David Bellinger
- Through the Magic Pyramid (1981) - Bobby Tuttle
- CBS Afternoon Playhouse (episode: Revenge of the Nerd) (1983) - Dalton Surewood

== Bibliography ==
- Holmstrom, John (1996). The Moving Picture Boy: An International Encyclopædia from 1895 to 1995. Norwich: Michael Russell. p. 358. ISBN 978-0-8595-5178-6.
