= Jackie Earle Haley =

American actor (born 1961)

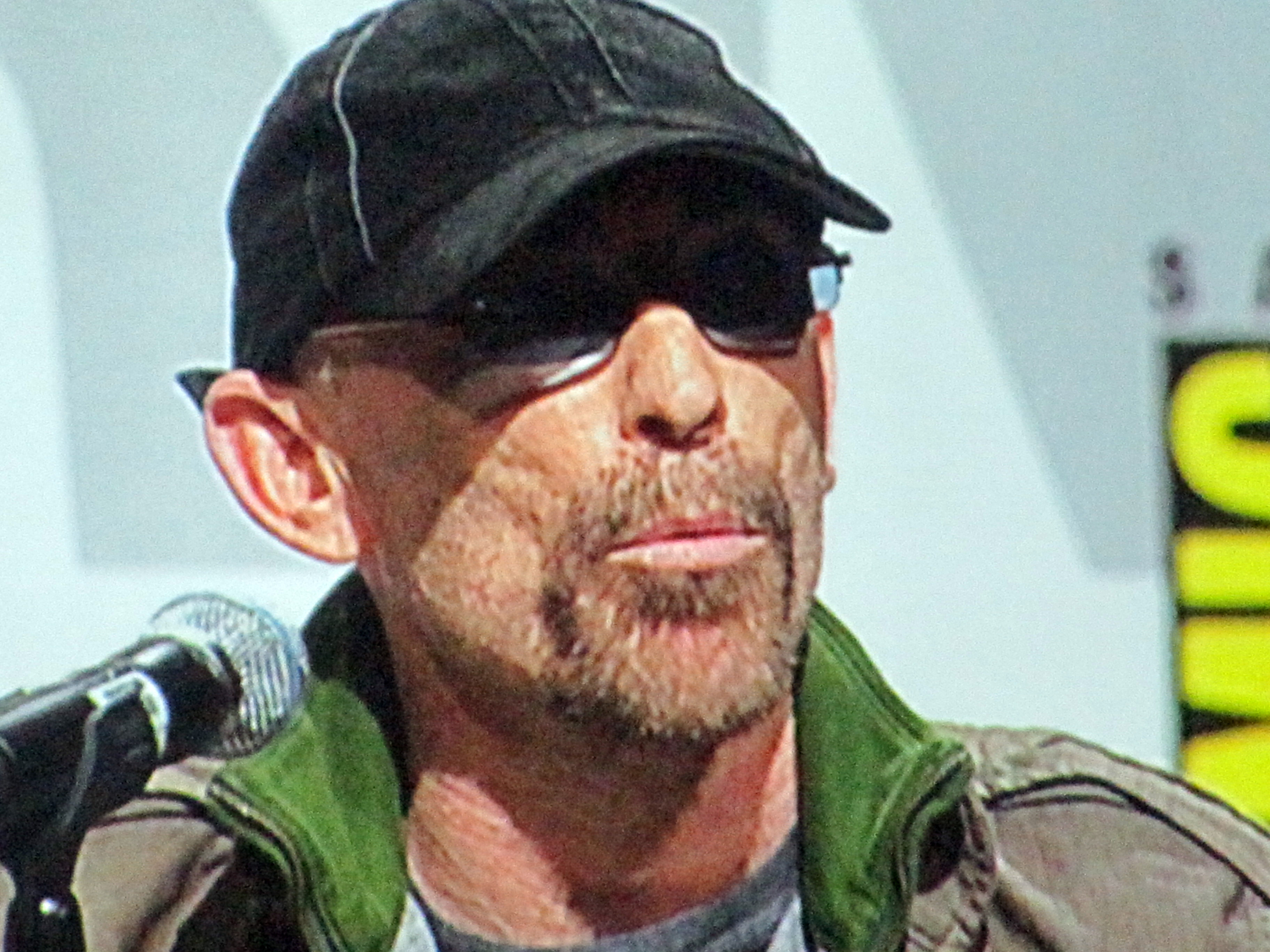
- Haley at the A Nightmare on Elm Street panel at WonderCon, 2010
- Born: Jack Earle Haley; July 14, 1961 (age 65); Los Angeles, California, U.S.
- Occupation: Actor
- Years active: 1972–present
- Spouse(s): Sherry Vaughan (m. 1979; div. ??); Jennifer Hargrave (m. 1985; div. ??) Amelia Cruz (m. 2004)
- Children: 2

Jack Earle Haley (born July 14, 1961) is an American actor. His earliest roles included Moocher in Breaking Away (1979) and Kelly Leak in The Bad News Bears (1976), The Bad News Bears in Breaking Training (1977) and The Bad News Bears Go to Japan (1978). After spending many years as a producer and director of television commercials, he revived his acting career with a supporting role in All the King's Men (2006). This was followed by his performance in Little Children (2006), for which he was nominated for the Academy Award for Best Supporting Actor.

His subsequent notable roles include the antihero Rorschach in Watchmen (2009), horror icon Freddy Krueger in the remake of A Nightmare on Elm Street (2010), and Grewishka, a cyborg criminal in Alita: Battle Angel (2019). He played Odin Quincannon in the first season (2016) of Preacher and The Terror in the first season (2016–18) of The Tick.

== Early life ==
Haley was born and raised in the Northridge neighborhood of Los Angeles, the son of Haven Earle "Bud" Haley, a radio show host/disc jockey and actor, and Iris D. Douglas.

== Career ==
Haley’s first role came at age five, when he was cast as the voice of Dennis the Menace in a series of animated commercials. He reprised the role of Dennis in two episodes of Curiosity Shop, his earliest known role in a television series.

Haley has appeared in numerous films, including John Schlesinger's The Day of the Locust, Damnation Alley, and Losin' It, as well as guest roles on TV. A well-known child actor, he starred as Kelly Leak in the comedy The Bad News Bears, as well as the sequels The Bad News Bears in Breaking Training and The Bad News Bears Go to Japan.

He played Moocher in Peter Yates's acclaimed 1979 film Breaking Away and later in the short-lived TV series of the same name. Throughout the 1970s, he often played tough, angry, long-haired misfits; although in his feature debut, the offbeat 1972 film The Outside Man, he played Eric, a boy so desperately lonely that he tries to impress the mob assassin holding him and his mother (Georgia Engel) hostage. Haley also shot a pilot for an American version of the popular British comedy The Young Ones titled Oh, No! Not THEM!. In 1974 he played Norm, a misfit kid, in the 12th episode of the Saturday morning children's show Shazam!

Haley's acting career went dormant during most of the 1990s and early 2000s, when he moved to San Antonio. He wrote the script for what would become the 1990 film Playroom, then titled Schizo. Haley intended to serve as director; this role was instead given to then first-time director Manny Coto. He eventually began directing and producing television commercials, which proved to be successful for him.

With the recommendation of Sean Penn, Haley returned to acting in 2006, first appearing in Steven Zaillian's All the King's Men alongside Penn as Sugar Boy, his bodyguard, before giving a critically acclaimed performance as a recently paroled sex offender in Todd Field's Little Children. He stated that his preparation for the role was greatly influenced by the relationship shared between his mother and his brother True, who battled a heroin addiction before he died of an overdose. Haley was nominated for an Academy Award for Best Supporting Actor for this portrayal and in 2007 was invited to join the Academy of Motion Picture Arts and Sciences.

Haley owns a production company, JEH Productions, in San Antonio. In 2008, he appeared in Semi-Pro and starred in Winged Creatures with Kate Beckinsale, Guy Pearce and Dakota Fanning. He also stars in Zack Snyder's 2009 adaptation of the Alan Moore graphic novel Watchmen as Rorschach, a masked vigilante working to find the identity of a costumed hero killer, a role which earned him praise from many reviewers. The film also reunited him with Little Children co-star Patrick Wilson who played Nite Owl II, Rorschach's former partner. Also in 2010, Haley appeared in Shutter Island, directed by Martin Scorsese, as a patient of a hospital for the criminally insane.

In 2010, Haley played Freddy Krueger in the A Nightmare on Elm Street remake. He signed to play the role in a sequel, which was not produced.

Haley has dismissed rumors that he accompanied Johnny Depp to auditions for Wes Craven's original A Nightmare on Elm Street (1984) to audition for the role Depp was eventually cast in.

Haley was a series regular on Human Target as Guerrero, an ally of the main character, Christopher Chance. The series premiered on January 17, 2010 on Fox, and ran for two seasons before being cancelled in May 2011.

He played Willie Loomis in the 2012 film adaptation of Dark Shadows, directed by Tim Burton, and played Confederate States Vice President Alexander H. Stephens in Lincoln, directed by Steven Spielberg. He played the supervillain The Terror in Amazon's re-boot of The Tick.

== Personal life ==
Haley's first marriage was to Sherry Vaughan in 1979. He has two children: a son, Christopher (born 1986), and a daughter, Olivia (born 1998), by his second wife, Jennifer Haley. He married his third wife, Amelia Cruz, in 2004 and they live in San Antonio, Texas. Haley holds black belts in Kenpo and Taekwondo.

== Filmography ==
=== Film ===
Year	Title	Role	Notes
1972	The Outside Man	Eric	
1975	The Day of the Locust	Adore Loomis	
1976	The Bad News Bears	Kelly Leak	
1977	The Bad News Bears in Breaking Training	Kelly Leak	
1977	Damnation Alley	Billy	Filmed from June - August, 1976. Released October, 1977.
1978	The Bad News Bears Go to Japan	Kelly Leak	
1979	Breaking Away	Moocher	
1983	Losin' It	Dave	
1985	The Zoo Gang	Little Joe	
1991	Dollman	Braxton Red	
1992	Nemesis	Einstein	
1992	Maniac Cop III: Badge of Silence	Frank Jessup	
2006	All the King's Men	Roderick "Sugar Boy" Ellis	
2006	Little Children	Ronald James McGorvey	Chicago Film Critics Association Award for Best Supporting Actor; Dallas-Fort Worth Film Critics Association Award for Best Supporting Actor; Iowa Film Critics Award for Best Supporting Actor; National Society of Film Critics Awards for Best Supporting Actor (2nd place); New York Film Critics Circle Award for Best Supporting Actor; Oklahoma Film Critics Circle Award for Best Supporting Actor; Online Film Critics Society Award for Best Supporting Actor; San Francisco Film Critics Circle Award for Best Supporting Actor; Southeastern Film Critics Association Award for Best Supporting Actor; Village Voice Film Poll for Best Supporting Actor; Nominated – Academy Award for Best Supporting Actor; Nominated – Alliance of Women Film Journalists Award for Best Ensemble Cast; Nominated – Awards Circuit Community Award for Best Supporting Actor; Nominated – Gold Derby Film Award for Best Supporting Actor; Nominated – Screen Actors Guild Award for Outstanding Performance by a Male Actor in a Supporting Role
2008	Semi-Pro	Dukes	
2009	Winged Creatures	Bob Jasperson	
2009	Watchmen	Walter Kovacs / Rorschach	Nominated – Online Film Critics Society Award for Best Supporting Actor
2010	Shutter Island	George Noyce	Nominated – Fangoria Chainsaw Award for Best Supporting Actor
2010	A Nightmare on Elm Street	Freddy Krueger	Nominated – Teen Choice Award for Choice Movie Actor: Horror/Thriller; Nominated – Scream Award for Best Villain
2010	Louis	Judge Perry	A silent movie traditionally accompanied by live performances from Wynton Marsalis and an all star jazz ensemble.
2012	Dark Shadows	Willie Loomis	
2012	Lincoln	Alexander H. Stephens	
2013	Parkland	Father Oscar Huber	
2014	RoboCop	Rick Mattox	
2015	Criminal Activities	Gerry	Also director
2016	The Birth of a Nation	Raymond Cobb	
2016	London Has Fallen	Chief Deputy Mason	
2017	The Dark Tower	Sayre	
2019	Alita: Battle Angel	Grewishka	
2020	Death of a Telemarketer	Asa Ellenbogen	
2021	No Future	Philip	
2022	My Father's Dragon	Tamir the Tarsier (voice)	
2023	Devil's Peak	Rogers	
2023	Hypnotic	Jeremiah	
2023	The Retirement Plan	Donnie	
2024	The Long Game	Richard Metzger	
2024	The Union	Foreman	
2024	Dead Money	Wendel AKA Shotgun	
2025	Your Host	The Host	
2026	Family Movie	TBA	Post-production
TBA	They Follow †	TBA	Post-production
TBA	The Block †	TBA	Post-production

=== Television ===
Year	Title	Role	Notes
1971	Curiosity Shop	Dennis the Menace (voice)	2 episodes
1972	Wait Till Your Father Gets Home	Jamie Boyle (voice)	11 episodes
1973	The Partridge Family	Rusty	Episode: "The Strike-Out King"
1973	Marcus Welby, M.D.	Tony	Episode: "Nguyen"
1974	These Are the Days	Danny Day (voice)	16 episodes
1974	Valley of the Dinosaurs	Greg Butler (voice)	16 episodes
1974	Planet of the Apes	Kraik	Episode: "The Legacy"
1975	Shazam!	Norm Briggs	Episode: "The Delinquent"
1975	The Waltons	Tom	Episode: "The Emergence"
1979	The Love Boat	Paul Turner's "son"	2 episodes
1980	Insight	Ernie Briggs	Episode: "Chicken"
1980–1981	Breaking Away	Moocher	8 episodes
1981	Every Stray Dog and Kid	Tommy Ryan	Television film
1983	American Playhouse	Seventeen-and-Desperate	Episode: "Miss Lonelyhearts"
1983	Whiz Kids	Harlan	Episode: "A Chip Off the Old Block"
1985	MacGyver	Turk	Episode: "Last Stand"
1986	Murder, She Wrote	Billy Willetts	Episode: "Powder Keg"
1990	Oh, No! Not THEM!	Rip	Television film
1990	Gravedale High	Gill Waterman (voice)	13 episodes
1991	Get a Life	Cousin Donald	Episode: "Chris vs. Donald"
1992	Renegade	Stick	Episode: "Mother Courage"
1993	Prophet of Evil: The Ervil LeBaron Story	Eddie Marston	Television film
2010–2011	Human Target	Guerrero	25 episodes
2016	Preacher	Odin Quincannon	8 episodes
2016–2017	The Tick	The Terror	11 episodes
2018	Narcos: Mexico	Jim Ferguson	2 episodes
2022	The First Lady	Louis Howe	5 episodes
2023	Killing It	Troy Chubner	Multiple episodes
2026	Cupertino	Judge Lincoln Cogswell	2 episodes

=== Theatre ===
Year	Title	Voice role	Notes
1983	Slab Boys	Hector McKenzie	Playhouse Theatre, New York City

=== Video games ===
Year	Title	Voice role	Notes
2009	Watchmen: The End Is Nigh	Walter Kovacs / Rorschach	
2014	The Evil Within	Ruvik	
