= Alfred Lutter =

American entrepreneur

- Born: Alfred William Lutter III; March 21, 1962 (age 64); Ridgewood, New Jersey, U.S.
- Education: Stanford University
- Occupations: Entrepreneur; engineer; consultant
- Years active: 1974–1977

Alfred William Lutter III (born March 21, 1962) is an American entrepreneur, engineer, consultant, and former child actor.

== Life and career ==
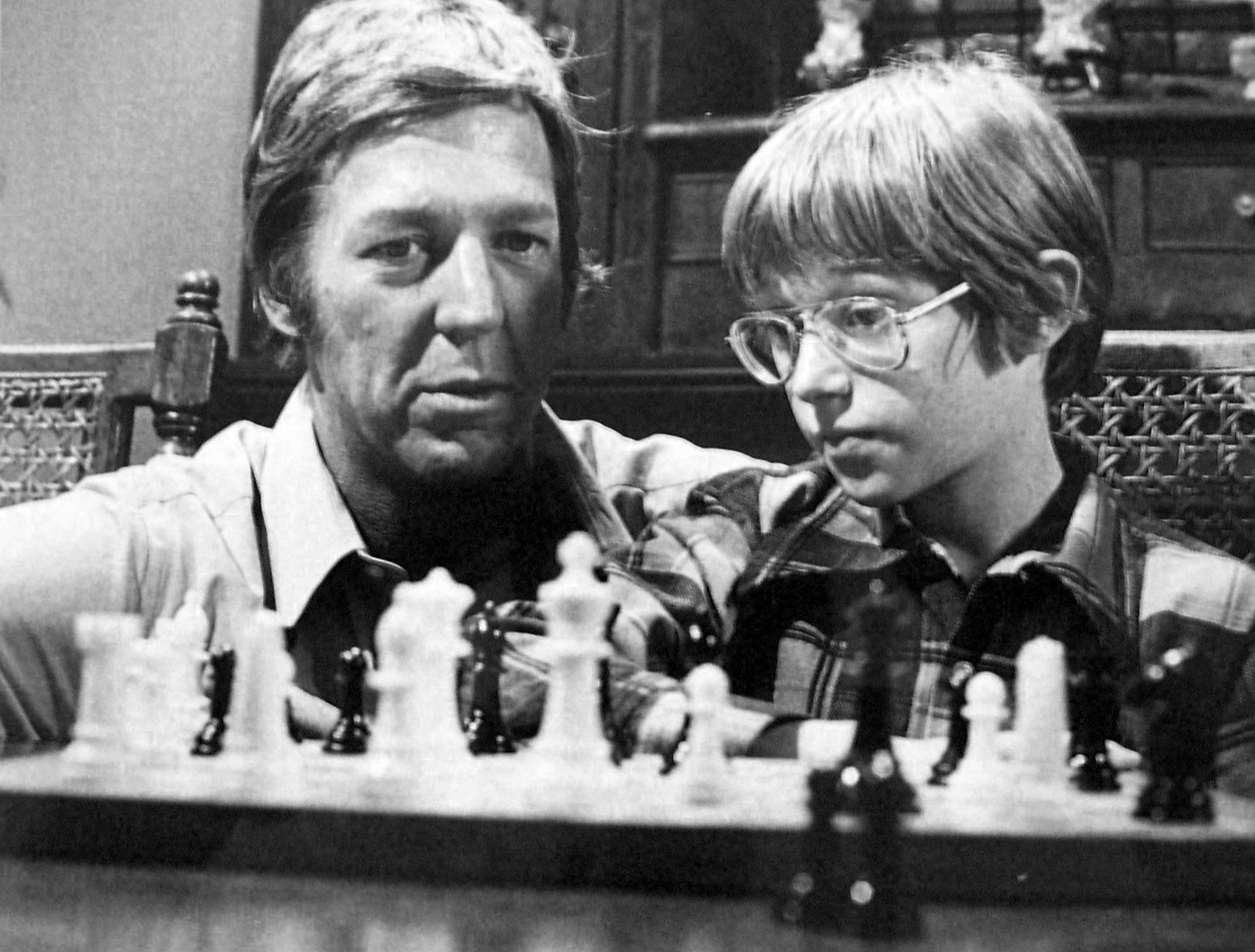
Lutter (right) with David Hartman (left) on NBC's Lucas Tanner in the episode "Thirteen Going on Twenty" (1974)

Lutter was born on March 21, 1962, in Ridgewood, New Jersey, where he also grew up. He graduated from Ridgewood High School in 1980. Lutter starred along with Ellen Burstyn and Jodie Foster in the 1974 Martin Scorsese film Alice Doesn't Live Here Anymore. The TV series Alice was a spin-off of this movie, in which he reprised his role as Alice's son Tommy in the pilot episode but was replaced by Philip McKeon when the series began.

Lutter also appeared as the young version of Woody Allen's character, Boris, in Love and Death; and played the brainy Alfred Ogilvie in the original The Bad News Bears, and its first sequel, The Bad News Bears in Breaking Training. He also starred as Phillip in The Cay, a TV movie about a black Caribbean Islander and a white American boy lost on an island.

He earned a Bachelor of Science degree in civil engineering from Stanford University in 1984 and a Master of Science degree in management and engineering from Stanford in 1988. In June 1986, he founded Lutter Consulting, a company providing technology strategy, organizational management, and outsourced software development services. He was also the CTO of Cumulus Media, E*Offering, and Lynda.com.

In 2026, Lutter and eight fellow cast members of The Bad News Bears appeared on the TCM Classic Cruise, where they were interviewed by Ben Mankiewicz.

== Filmography ==
Year	Title	Role	Notes
1974	Alice Doesn't Live Here Anymore	Tommy	Nominee- BAFTA Award for Most Promising Newcomer to Leading Film Roles
1974	The Cay	Phillip	TV movie
1974	Lucas Tanner	Scott Glaser	Episode: "Thirteen Going on Twenty"
1975	Love and Death	Young Boris	
1975	It Must Be Love ('Cause I Feel So Dumb)	Erik	ABC Afterschool Special
1976	The Bad News Bears	Ogilvie	
1977	The Bad News Bears in Breaking Training	Ogilvie	(final film role to date)
1977	Family	Alvin	Episode: "Someone's Watching"

== Bibliography ==
- Holmstrom, John (1996). The Moving Picture Boy: An International Encyclopaedia from 1895 to 1995. Norwich: Michael Russell. pp. 341–342. ISBN 978-0-8595-5178-6..
- Putt, Jr., Barry M. (2019). Alice: Life Behind the Counter in Mel's Greasy Spoon (A Guide to the Feature Film, the TV Series, and More). Albany, Georgia: BearManor Media. ISBN 978-1-6293-3426-4..
