= Bill Lancaster =

American screenwriter (1947–1997)

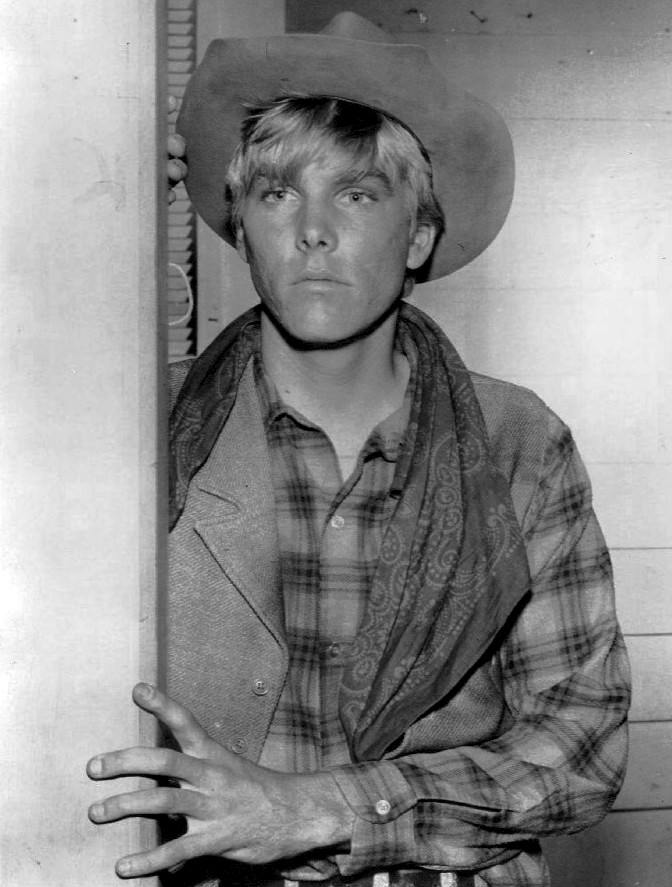
- Lancaster in The Big Valley (1967)
- Born: William Henry Lancaster; November 17, 1947; Los Angeles, California, U.S.
- Died: January 4, 1997 (aged 49); Los Angeles, California, U.S.
- Resting place: Westwood Memorial Park
- Occupations: Screenwriter, actor
- Years active: 1965–1997
- Spouse: Kippie Kovacs (m. 1965)
- Children: 1
- Parent: Burt Lancaster
- Relatives: Ernie Kovacs (father-in-law)

William Henry Lancaster (November 17, 1947 – January 4, 1997) was an American screenwriter and actor. The son of Burt Lancaster, he was perhaps best known for his screenplays for The Bad News Bears and The Thing.

== Early life ==
He was born November 17, 1947, in Los Angeles, California, the son of Burt Lancaster (1913–1994) and Norma Anderson (1917–1988). He contracted polio at an early age, leaving one leg shorter than the other.

== Career ==
Lancaster, who resembled his famous father at the time, guest-starred in an episode of the television series The Big Valley in 1967. Lancaster played the role of "King", the boyfriend of a murdered college student in The Midnight Man (1974), a mystery film starring and co-directed by his father.

Lancaster's best-known work is his adapted screenplay for John Carpenter's The Thing. He also penned the original screenplays for two of The Bad News Bears films.

In 1982, he worked on a first-draft script of an adaptation of Stephen King's novel Firestarter for Carpenter to direct. Months later of the same year, Carpenter hired Bill Phillips to work on a rewrite of Lancaster's draft. When The Thing did not match the studio's financial expectations, Universal replaced Carpenter with Mark L. Lester and both drafts were scrapped in favor of Stanley Mann's draft.

Lancaster is featured in the documentary The Thing: Terror Takes Shape, found on the collector's edition DVD of The Thing. Lancaster states that he did not think Who Goes There? was a "great" story, but that he responded to the tale's sense of claustrophobia and paranoia. The documentary is dedicated to him.

== Personal life ==
Lancaster was married to Kippie Kovacs, daughter of the comedian Ernie Kovacs. They had one child, daughter Keigh.

== Death ==
Lancaster died of a heart attack at the age of 49. His ashes were buried at Westwood Village Memorial Park Cemetery, where his father's ashes are also interred. The ashes of his daughter, who died in 2017 at age 51, were buried with her father's in the same plot.

== Filmography ==
=== Screenplays ===
- The Bad News Bears (1976)
- The Bad News Bears Go to Japan (1978) (Also co-producer)
- The Thing (1982)
- Firestarter (1984) (earlier unused screenplay)

=== Acting ===
- The Big Valley (1967) – Second Boy
- Moses the Lawgiver (1974, TV Mini-Series) – Young Moses
- The Midnight Man (1974) – King
