= Jonathan Edwards College =

Residential College at Yale University

Coordinates: 41.3089°N 72.9300°W

- Residential college at Yale University
- Yale University
- Coat of arms of Jonathan Edwards College
- Location: 68 High Street
- Nickname: JE or J.E.
- Motto: JE SUX (Latin)
- Established: 1933
- Named for: Jonathan Edwards
- Colors: Green and White
- Sister college: Eliot House (Harvard)
- Head: W. Mark Saltzman
- Dean: Yaser S. Robles
- Undergraduates: 427 (2013–2014)
- Fellows: 257
- Mascot: Spider
- Called: Spiders
- Website: www.yale.edu/je

Jonathan Edwards College (informally JE) is a residential college at Yale University. It is named for theologian and minister Jonathan Edwards, a 1720 graduate of Yale College. JE's residential quadrangle was the first to be completed in Yale's residential college system, and was opened to undergraduates in 1933.

Among James Gamble Rogers' original eight residential colleges, it is distinct in incorporating pre-existing buildings. Since its renovation in 2008, the college houses 212 students and several faculty fellows. In total, it has around 425 affiliated students and 250 affiliated fellows.

== History ==
Main entrance to Jonathan Edwards College

In 1930, Yale President James Rowland Angell announced a "Quadrangle Plan" for Yale College, establishing small collegiate communities in the style of Oxford and Cambridge in order to foster more social intimacy among students and faculty, relieve dormitory overcrowding, and reduce the influence of on-campus fraternities and societies. Professor Robert Dudley French was one of the earliest advocates of this plan and visited Oxford and Cambridge to study aspects of their college systems. In 1930, Angell appointed him Master of Jonathan Edwards College, the first such appointment at Yale.

JE's early years saw a flourishing of political activity among students. In 1934 the Yale Political Union was founded in the college.

During World War II, JE was one of three residential colleges which remained open to civilian students. During this time, it became a significant site of intelligence community activity. Master French, who remained at the college through 1953, and his successor, William Dunham, were conduits for undergraduate recruitment into intelligence positions. Fellow and future dean Joseph Curtiss was extensively involved in CIA reconnaissance projects, including one known as the "Yale Library Project."

Until the university abolished the practice 1962 and placed students in the colleges by lottery, the college admitted students by application after completion of their freshman year. During the 1960s, Master Beekman Cannon deepened a tradition of performing arts in the college, hosting operas, plays, recitals, and musical satire.

In 1974, Rosemary A. Stevens became the first woman to be appointed head of a Yale residential college in her own right. A few years later, H. Catherine W. Skinner became the first woman in Yale history to complete a term as residential college head.

== Namesake ==
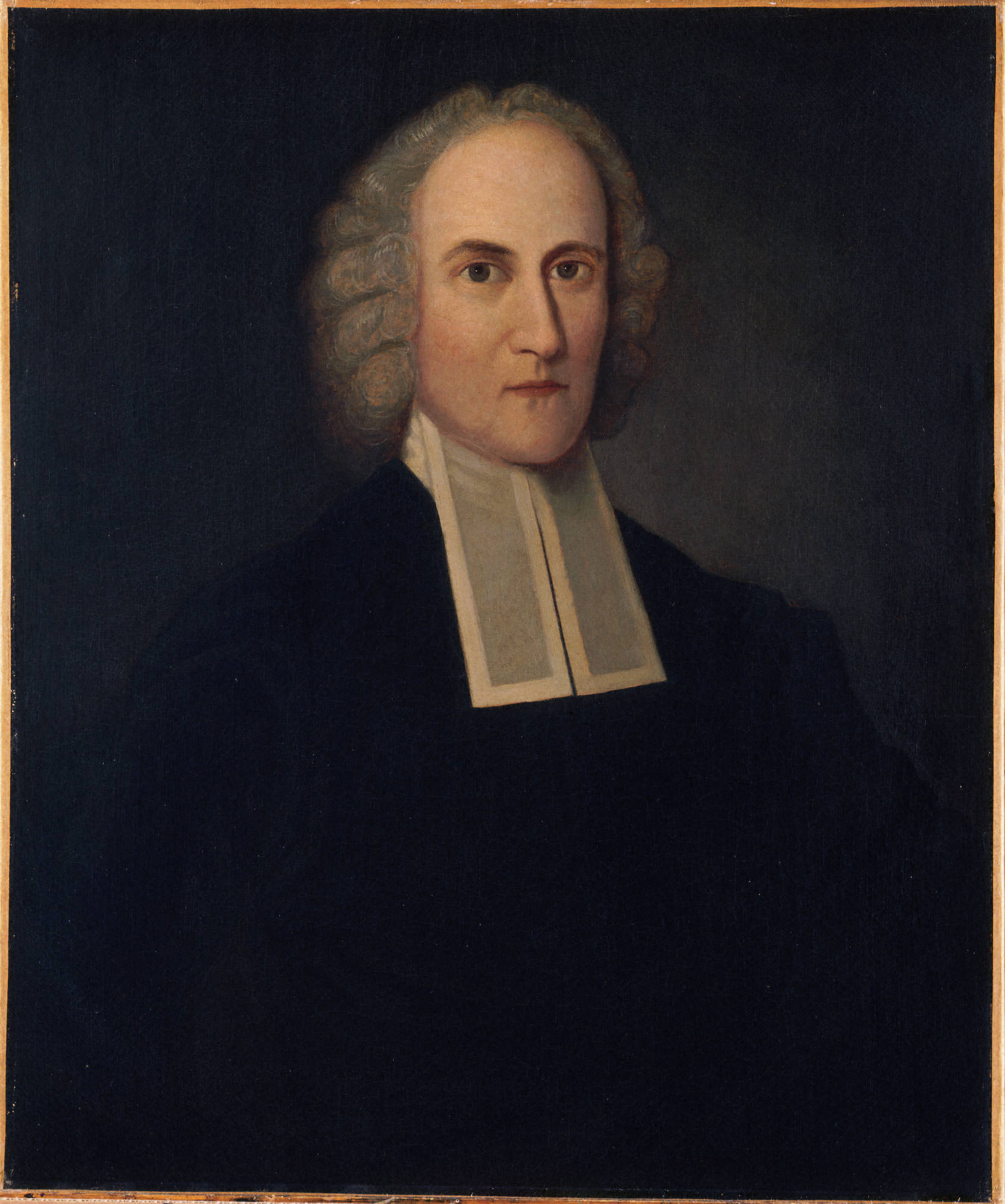
Copy of Joseph Badger's portrait of Edwards; the original hangs in the college

Jonathan Edwards matriculated at Yale College in 1716 near his 13th birthday. Four years later, he graduated as valedictorian of his class of about twenty. This was at a time when entrance into either Harvard or Yale required ability in Latin, Greek, and Hebrew. Edwards received his Masters of Arts from Yale in 1722. In 1724, he returned to the college as a tutor respected for his theological orthodoxy, anti-Arminianism, and devotion to Yale.

== Buildings ==
=== Design ===
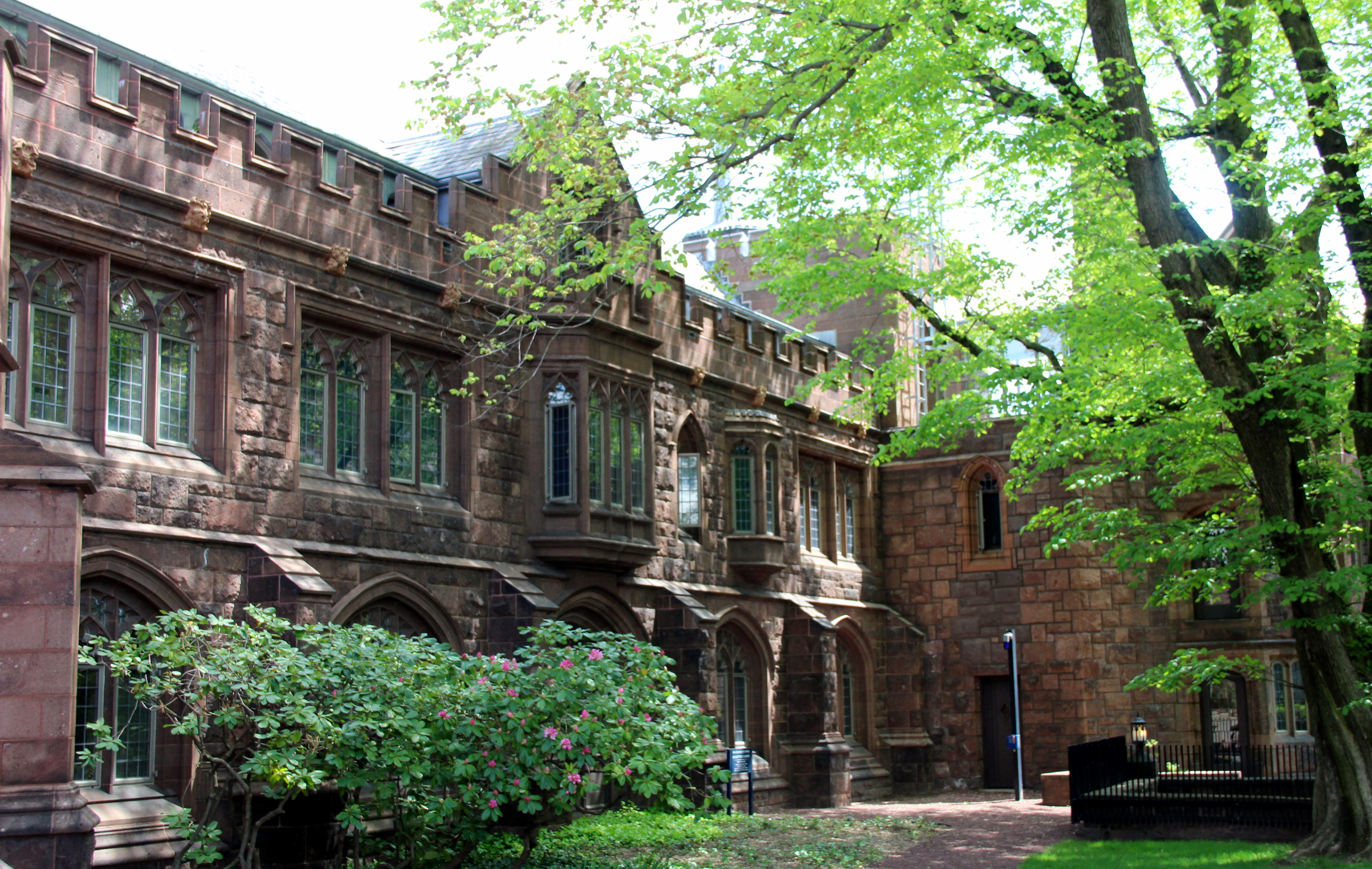
Weir Hall, JE's oldest building, from the Art Gallery sculpture garden

The dominant architectural style of JE is Gothic Revival, and the campus consists of two- to four-story buildings surrounding an open courtyard. It is the only one of James Gamble Rogers' eight colleges to blend new and pre-existing buildings. Less ornate than the adjacent Memorial Quadrangle, JE became the template for Yale's gothic residential projects.

Some of JE's residential buildings are older than the college itself. The York-Library dormitory, completed in 1924, is a short, L-shaped building meant to complete the Gothic corridor along Library Street (now Library Walk). When Yale announced its college plan in 1928, Rogers reconfigured and expanded the York-Library dormitory, renaming its wings as Dickinson Hall and Wheelock Hall after early alumni who were the founding presidents of Princeton and Dartmouth.

Constructing the rest of JE required the demolition of Kent Chemical Laboratory, replaced with Kent Hall on High Street. A dining hall and Head's house were also added, creating the enclosed courtyard that Rogers wanted for each college under his "quadrangle plan."

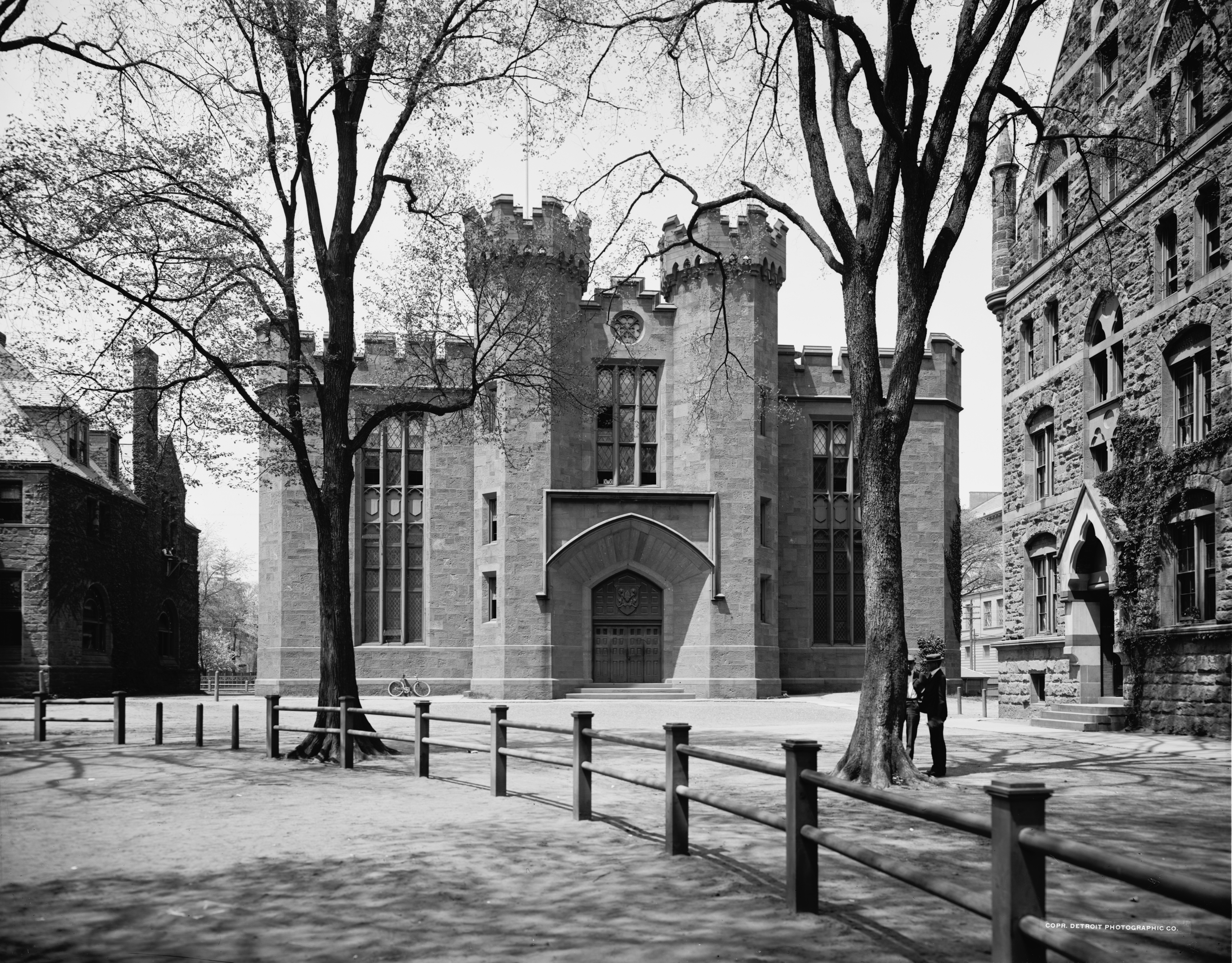
Alumni Hall on Old Campus, from which Weir Hall's towers were salvaged

JE's last addition, added in 1965, is also the college's oldest building. The construction of Weir Hall began in 1911 when George Douglas Miller decided to build a dormitory for Skull and Bones, an independent "senior society" for Yale students. Miller salvaged the castle-like facade from Alumni Hall, a building on Old Campus originally constructed in 1851. The new Skull and Bones dormitory was never completed and was purchased by the university in 1912. Weir Hall hosted Yale's Department of Architecture from 1924 until 1965. When the school was given a new building, Weir was converted to a dormitory and library building for JE.

=== Expansion and renovation ===
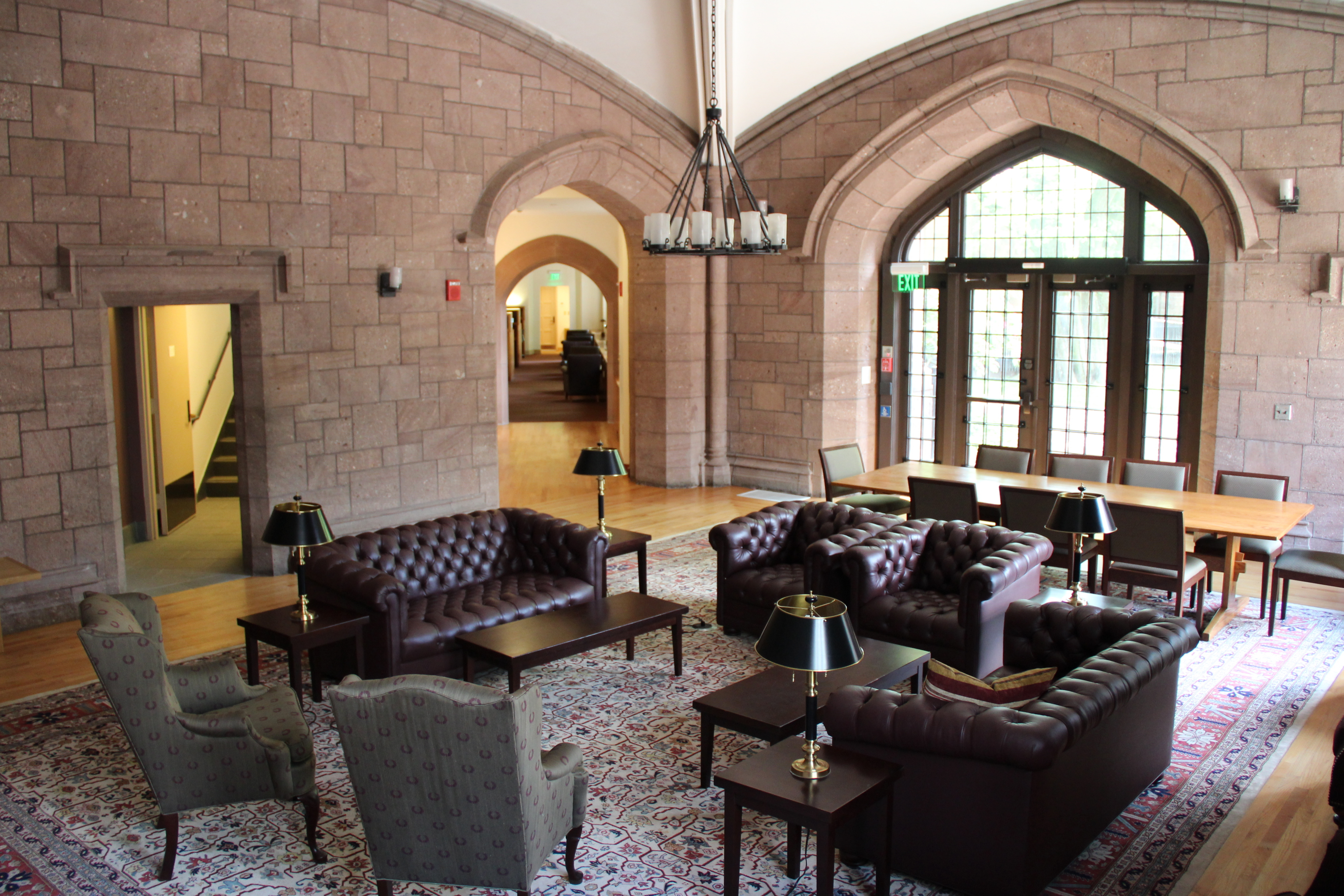
The Robert Taft Library, built in 1965

Though the basic architectural program of the college has remained unchanged since its opening, JE has undergone several significant renovations. In 1965, the annexation of Weir Hall allowed for the construction of the Robert Taft Library, faculty offices, and college seminar rooms, expanding the limited library space available in the original college.

In 2007, as part of a twelve-year program to renovate all of Yale's residential colleges, Newman Architects led a major, yearlong renovation of JE. The renovation aimed to improve connectivity and accessibility, upgrade building systems, and restore and enhance building facilities. Most residential suites were reconfigured, administrative offices were consolidated, and the college was retrofitted with elevators and lower-level staircases. Residences for upperclassmen and graduate affiliates were added to Weir Hall, completing JE's multi-decade annexation of the building. After several months of delays due to the complexity of the renovation, the college was rededicated in December 2008 in a ceremony commemorating the seventy-fifth anniversary of the residential college system.

=== Facilities ===
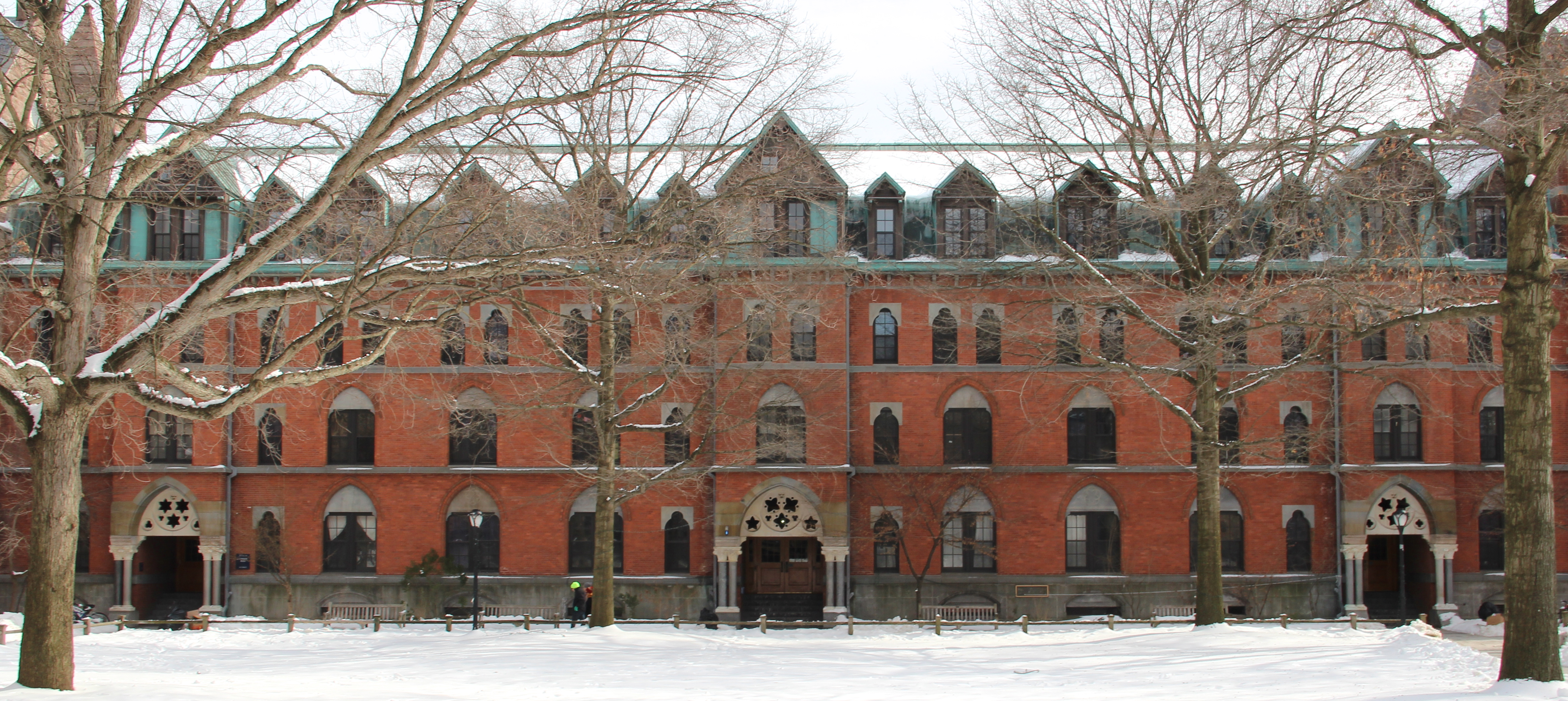
Farnam Hall on Old Campus, JE's freshman residence hall

The freshman class lives in Bingham Hall on the Old Campus, and approximately half of the junior class lives in McClellan Hall. Due to the small size of the college and the proximity of McClellan, more upperclassmen live in annex housing than any other college (this isn't a good thing).

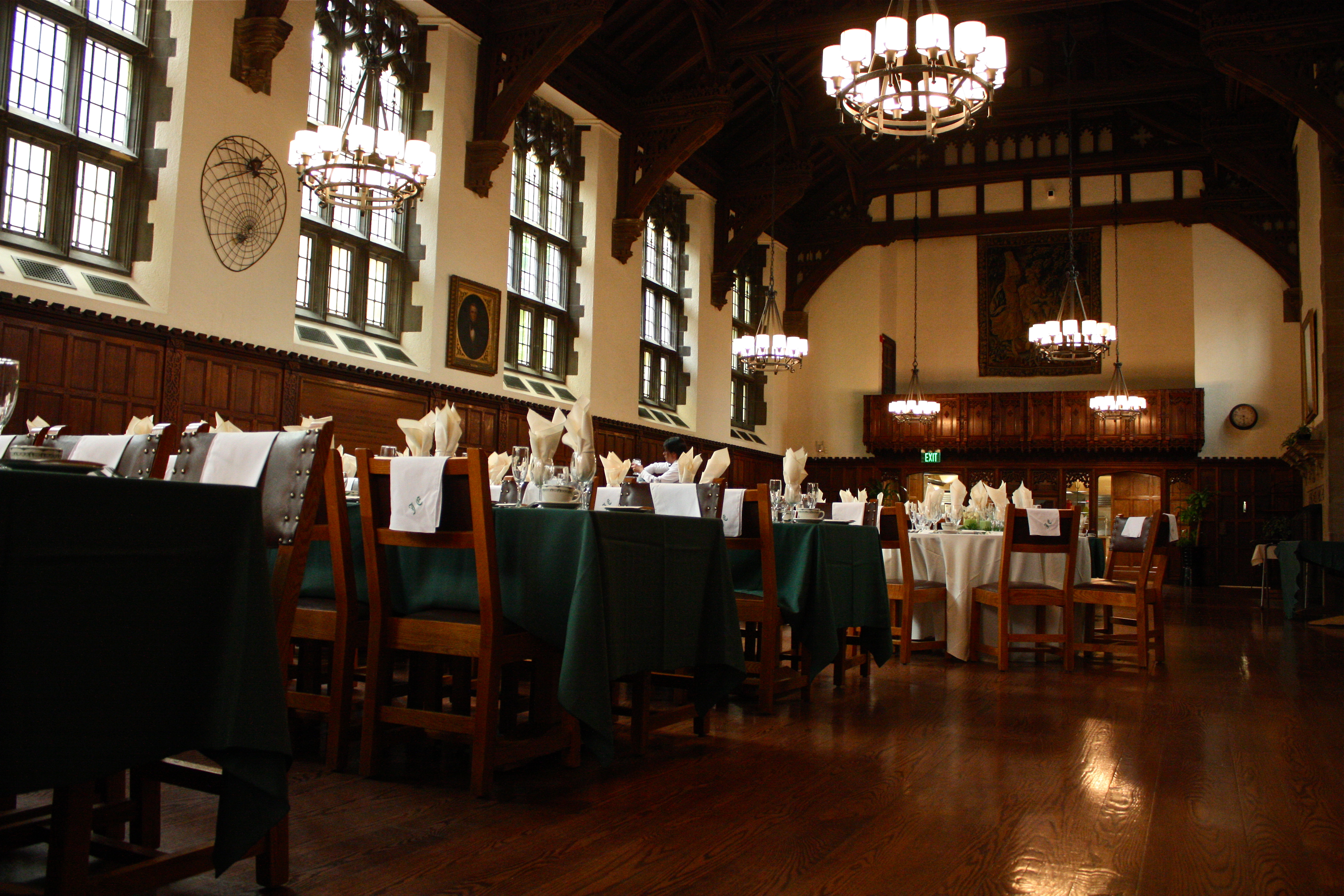
The Great Hall set for a class dinner

The Great Hall, the Rogers-designed dining hall in JE, is in the style of an Elizabethan banquet hall, with a high timber truss ceiling and oak-paneled walls. The style is unique among the residential colleges, but akin to that of the University Commons. Unlike Commons, which is the largest dining venue on campus, the Great Hall was designed to be one of the smallest dining halls at Yale. On the upper walls are portraits of former heads, usually commissioned at the end of their tenure.

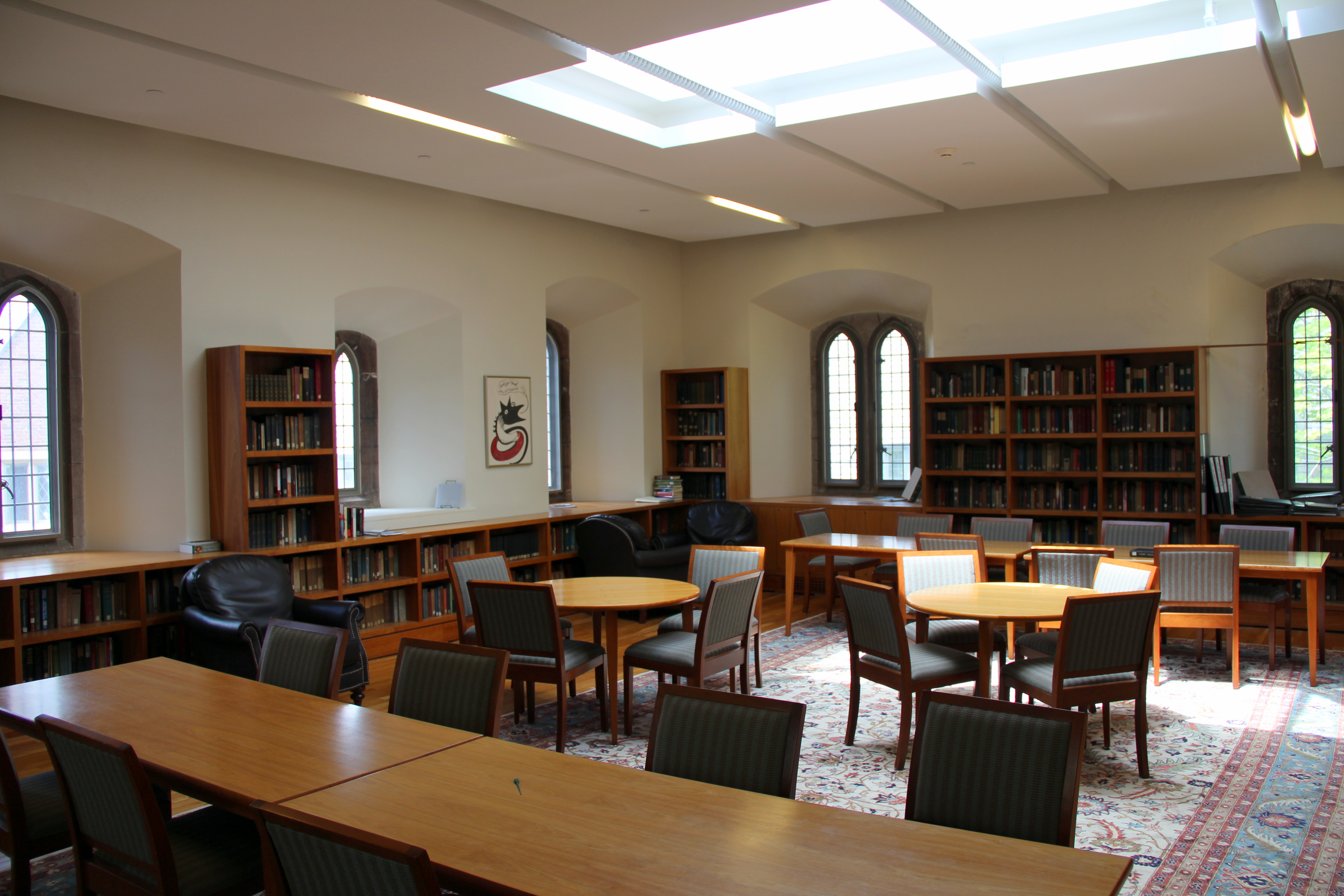
Beekman C. Cannon Reading Room

Both libraries in JE are located in Weir Hall. At the foot of Weir Hall is Curtis & Curtiss Library, a non-circulating library of JE memorabilia. It was designed by Rogers and features stained glass pieces produced by G. Owen Bonawit. The two-story Robert Taft Library, named for Senator Robert Taft, originally belonged to Weir Hall and was given over to the college in 1965.

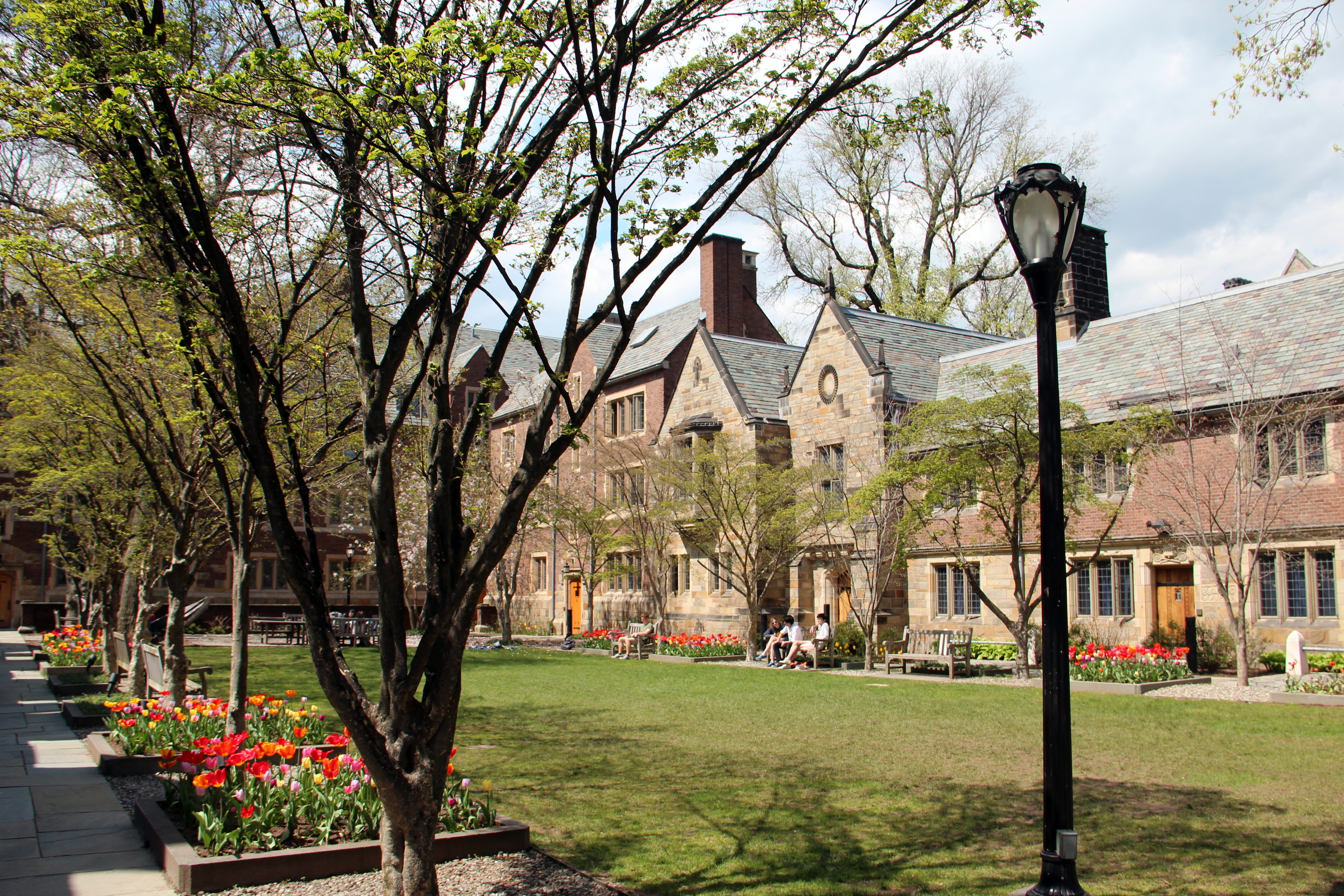
Courtyard of Jonathan Edwards College in spring

JE has one of the smallest main college courtyards at Yale. At the college's founding, the courtyard consisted of a lawn, referred to as the "Greensward," and an elliptical pathway. The open expanse of grass was landscaped in 1989 and a gated Head's Courtyard was constructed at the courtyard's east end.

Three iron entryway gates were cast by blacksmith Samuel Yellin. Yellin emblazoned the main gate with the dates "1720" and "1932", the year of Edwards' graduation from Yale and the year of the college's founding, respectively.

== Art and artwork ==
=== Memorabilia ===
Tributes to Jonathan Edwards are found throughout the college. Given to Yale by Edwards' descendants, original portraits by Joseph Badger of Edwards and his wife, Sarah Pierpont Edwards, hang in the Head of College's House dining room, and facsimiles hang in the Senior Common Room.

A walnut slant top desk believed to have belonged to Edwards also resides in the Head of College's House. The desk was discovered in the basement of the old Divinity School during its demolition in 1931 and moved to JE.

In 2008, stone-cut replicas of the Edwards' tombstones, hand carved by The John Stevens Shop, were installed in the college's basement.

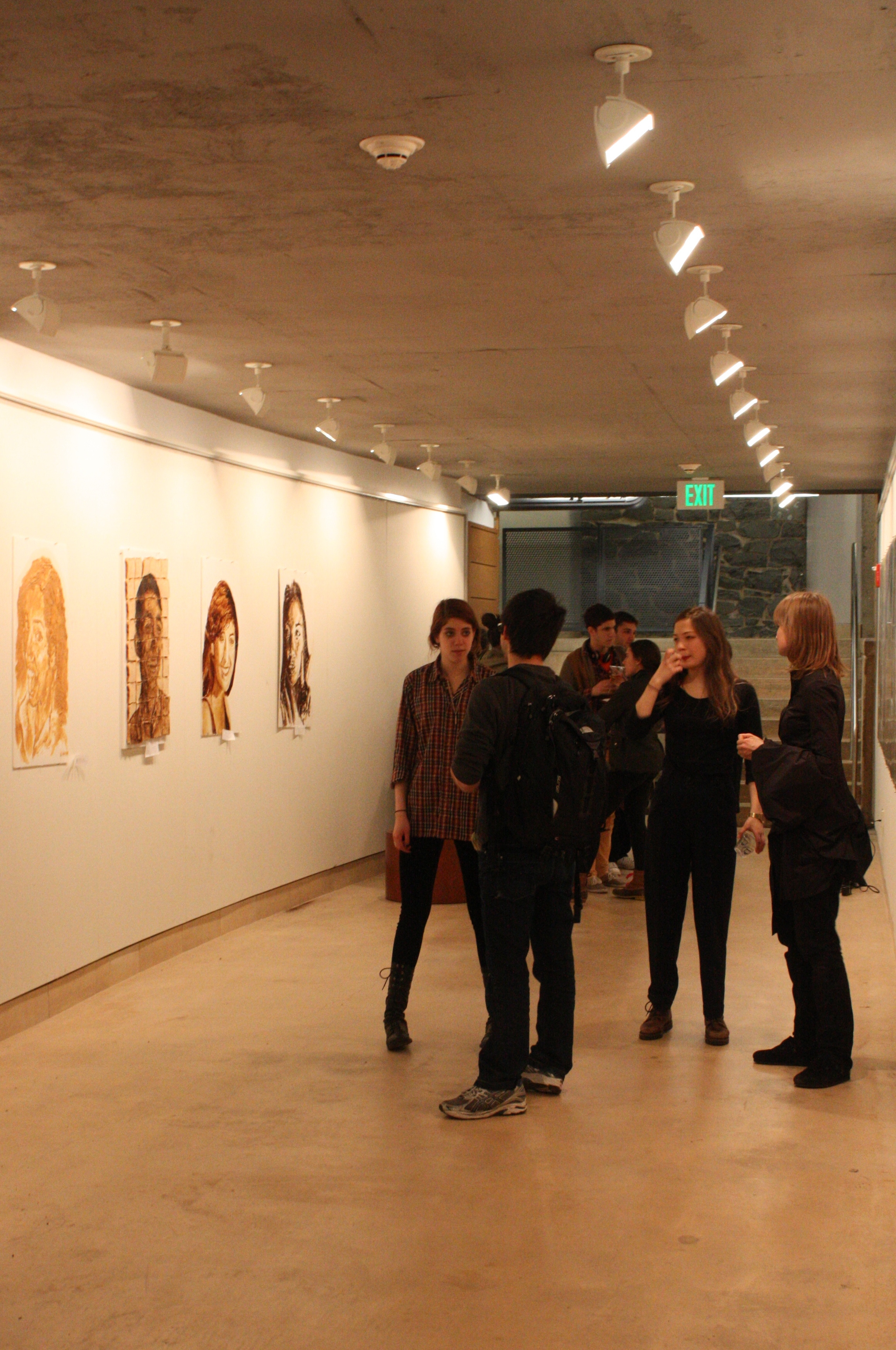
Student project on display in the JE Art Gallery

=== Sculpture ===
Sculptures have adorned the courtyard since its opening. In the 1930s, the courtyard featured an early eighteenth-century bronze statue of a young slave holding a sundial, purported to have belonged to Elihu Yale. It has since been transferred to the Yale University Art Gallery. In 2012, a bronze sundial honoring Master Gary Haller was installed near the site of the original sundial, bearing the crest and badge of the college.

Since 1998, the Yale University Art Gallery has loaned a twelve-foot bronze sculpture by Dimitri Hadzi, entitled "Floating Helmets", to the Head's Courtyard.

=== The JE Press ===
JE is one of two residential colleges which maintains active use of its print shop, the JE Press. JE owns three manual presses, one of which belonged to Frederic Goudy, and an automated Vandercook press. The JE Press is overseen by printer Richard Rose, who teaches classes each year in the printing arts.

=== Exhibitions ===
The work of artists affiliated with the college are on rotating display their art in the college's basement art gallery. A permanent installation of prints by Walker Evans can also be found in the basement, as well as historical memorabilia and ephemera printed by the JE Press.

== Insignia ==
The principal insignia of the college is its arms, described in heraldic terms as ermine, a lion rampant vert. Designed by Fritz Kredel, it is a simplified version of the coat of arms believed to have been used by the Edwards family. A green, rearing heraldic lion symbolizes courage and purity of heart. Its crimson tongue and nails exhibit willingness to pursue its goals with passion both of speech and strength. The veil of white that surrounds the lion symbolizes the grace of God. This shield is used on formal decorations and college letterhead.

Other insignia have been informally adopted for the college. A red apple surrounded by a green serpent, a reference to the Book of Genesis, is used on blazers and other college apparel. It recalls the Reverend Jonathan Edwards' preoccupation with the doctrine of original sin. It was devised by the first Master and Fellows, and designed by H. Dillington Palmer. It forms the silver head of the ebony mace of the College.

The college's mascot is the Spider, derived from a line in Jonathan Edwards' early descriptive writings on the creatures as well as his famous sermon "Sinners in the Hands of an Angry God," in which Edwards opines that "The God that holds you over the pit of hell, much as one holds a spider, or some loathsome insect over the fire, abhors you, and is dreadfully provoked." Members of the college are called "Spiders."

The unofficial motto of the college is "JE SUX." In 1975, several JE students came up with a strategy for victory in the annual Bladderball game. The plan was to take possession of the giant bladderball with a meathook. The bladderball deflated after being punctured by the meathook, prematurely ending the game and causing students of other colleges to chant "JE Sucks!" That winter, the jeer was lightheartedly adopted by JE's intramural ice hockey team, who went on to claim the intramural title. Since then, JE students have adopted the phrase as their rallying cry, with a slight twist: "Sux" instead of "Sucks," a gesture to the university's motto, Lux et Veritas.

== Student life ==
=== Student Activities ===
Yale's residential colleges compete in an annual intramural competitions in several dozen events. Each year, the most winning college across all events receives the Tyng Cup. After clinching the cup only twice in the first seventy-five years of the competition, JE won three consecutive Tyng Cup championships in 2009-'10, 2010-'11, and 2011-'12. It is currently tied for eighth in all-time Tyng victories.

Like its counterparts in the other residential colleges, the Jonathan Edwards College Council (JECC) is the elected student council that governs student life in the college. In conjunction with the Head of College and Dean, the JECC manages student facilities, capital purchases, and residential policies. In addition, many college traditions are organized by the JECC. However, only around 27% of JE students are interested in anything the JECC has to say. The Social Activities Committee is a volunteer student group which plans and hosts study breaks, dances, and miscellaneous college events.

=== College traditions ===
==== Culture Draw ====
In a tradition dating back to the 1960s, a raffle is held each semester for the students of the college to attend cultural and artistic performances in New York and New Haven. Fellows of the college accompany groups of students to each performance, usually taking them to dinner beforehand. Culture Draw events usually include performances of the Metropolitan Opera and New York City Ballet, Broadway musicals and plays, and symphony orchestra concerts.

==== Dances ====
The JE Screw is the college's iteration of the "screw" dances popular at Yale, during which suitemates will set up blind dates for each other and require pairs to "find each other" prior to the dance. JE Screw customarily takes place in the fall semester and is open to members of the college and their dates.

Considered the most formal of residential college balls, the Spider Ball is traditionally held immediately before Reading Period.

==== Annual Festivities ====
As a Fall semester in-gathering, students hold a "Great Awakening" courtyard picnic to commemorate the legacy of Jonathan Edwards and the American religious revival he inspired.

In October, students plant hundreds of tulip bulbs in courtyard planters, which bloom at the end of the spring semester. They also crown a Tulip Princess, a member of the college who most embodies the character or appearance of the flower.

Drawing on the Polish tradition of Dyngus Day, the "Wet Monday" water fight occurs each year at midnight on Easter Monday. While freshmen blitz the college with water balloons and squirt guns, upperclassmen attempt to defend the college quadrangle with an arsenal of hoses, water balloons, and other creative deterrents.

==== Men of JE ====
Formed in the fall of 1990 as a parody of singing group culture at Yale, the Men of JE are an audition-only a cappella group with a semi-secret membership. Claiming to be "part a cappella group, part defender of Yale and JE ideals," the Men are known to pester and prank students in Branford and other residential colleges. They traditionally perform original songs at JE events, whether or not they are invited to do so.

==== Branford College rivalry ====
Borne of their proximity, JE has a longstanding rivalry with Branford College. For decades, students from each college have caused mischief within their counterpart's buildings and grounds. Though most of the antics are spontaneous, every semester the Men of JE lead a late night brigade to Branford to disrupt last-minute studying at the end of Reading Period.

=== Sister college ===
JE's sister college at Harvard is Eliot House, a relationship formalized in 1934. The hospitality of each college is open to the fellows and students of the other; this primarily occurs during The Game, when Eliot House and JE host students of the other college.

== Fellows and affiliates ==
=== Fellowship ===
By nomination of the Head of College and approval of the Council of Heads of College, any Yale faculty member or professional employee can be named a fellow of JE. The Head of College may also nominate associate fellows, defined broadly as any person who is not an employee or recent graduate of Yale College. Fellows hold weekly fellows dinners in the college, teach college seminars, advise students on their course of study, and participate in the ceremonies and traditions of the college. The fellowship's most senior members appointed as president of the Junior Common Room and president of the Senior Common Room by order of seniority. Notable living fellows include Bob Alpern, Harold Bloom, David Bromwich, Scott Ellaway, Shelly Kagan, Chiara Mingarelli, Frank Rich, Herbert Scarf, Tom Steitz and Robert Stern.

== Fellowships ==
The Alan S. Tetelman Fellowship, endowed in memory of a JE alumnus and professor of metallurgy at UCLA who was killed in a 1978 plane crash, supports lectures and research fellowships at Yale. It is administered by the Head of JE, who invites distinguished scientists and science advocates to give the semesterly Tetelman Lecture. Past lecturers include Robert Ballard, Harry Blackmun, Ben Carson, Murray Gell-Mann, the Dalai Lama, David Lee, Amartya Sen, Maxine Singer, and James Watson. The Tetelman Fellowship also supports undergraduate research in the natural and applied sciences.

In 1962, JE received a large bequest in memory of Robert C. Bates, a fellow of the college and professor of French, by his sister Amy Bradish Groesbeck. These funds are disbursed as teaching and undergraduate research fellowships.

== Notable alumni ==
- Winthrop Rockefeller, 1935, governor of Arkansas, son of John D. Rockefeller Jr., and grandson of John D. Rockefeller (left Yale in 1934)
- Stanley Rogers Resor, 1939, US Secretary of the Army
- McGeorge Bundy, 1940, National Security Advisor to Presidents John F. Kennedy and Lyndon Johnson, dean of Harvard Faculty of Arts and Sciences
- John Lindsay, 1944, mayor of New York
- Frederick P. Rose, 1944, New York builder and philanthropist
- Murray Gell-Mann, 1948, physicist, 1969 winner of the Nobel Prize in Physics
- Nicholas F. Brady, 1952, US senator from New Jersey, US Secretary of the Treasury (1988–1993)
- Lewis H. Lapham, 1956, writer and publisher
- Wilbur Ross, 1959, 39th United States Secretary of Commerce, Wall Street financier, member of the Forbes 400
- Gus Speth, 1964, environmentalist, co-founder of the Natural Resource Defense Council, and dean of the Yale School of Forestry & Environmental Studies
- John Kerry, 1966, lieutenant governor of Massachusetts, US senator from Massachusetts, US presidential candidate (2004), and US Secretary of State
- Fred Smith, 1966, founder and president of FedEx
- Karl Marlantes, 1967, businessman and author
- Roland W. Betts, 1968, investor, lead owner in George W. Bush's Texas Rangers partnership (1989–1998), and developer and owner of Chelsea Piers
- Ron Rosenbaum, 1968, Gonzo journalist and writer, columnist for The New York Observer
- Peter Ochs, 1971, theologian and professor of Judaic studies
- Gary Locke, 1972, governor of Washington (1997–2005), US Secretary of Commerce (2009–2011), and US Ambassador to China (2011–2014)
- Gary Lucas, 1974, guitarist, Grammy-nominated songwriter, recording artist and soundtrack composer
- Christopher Buckley, 1975, author of Thank You for Smoking and son of William F. Buckley
- Ronni Alexander, 1977, lead plaintiff in Alexander v. Yale and professor of international relations
- Donald Ingber, 1977, cell biologist and bioengineer, discoverer of tensegrity architecture
- Donna Dubinsky, 1977, CEO of Palm, co-founder of Handspring, member of the Forbes 400
- Pamela Karlan, 1980, legal scholar
- Ann Packer, 1981, author of The Dive from Clausen's Pier
- Paul Bass, 1982, journalist and founder of the New Haven Independent
- Marvin Krislov, 1982, president of Oberlin College
- Amy Klobuchar, 1982, US senator from Minnesota
- Stephen Prothero, 1982, author and scholar of American religion
- Amity Shlaes, 1982, author and journalist
- Tom Perrotta, 1983, novelist, author of Little Children, Election and The Abstinence Teacher
- Andrew Solomon, 1985, writer, author of The Noonday Demon: An Atlas of Depression
- Jane Mendelsohn, 1986, novelist, author of I was Amelia Earhart
- Michael Barr, 1987, Vice Chair for Supervision of the Federal Reserve
- Christopher A. Wray, 1989, Director FBI
- Angela Warnick Buchdahl, 1994, Senior Rabbi of Central Synagogue
- David Leonhardt, 1994, writer for The New York Times
- Theo Epstein, 1995, formerly the youngest general manager in the history of MLB, when the Boston Red Sox hired him at the age of 28; currently President of Baseball Operations for the Chicago Cubs.
- Anne Wojcicki, 1996, co-founder of 23andMe
- Robert Lopez, 1997, Tony Award-winning composer and lyricist of Avenue Q and The Book of Mormon
- Nathan Chen, 2024, Two-time Olympic champion (2022), three-time world champion (2018, 2019, 2021), three-time grand prix final champion (2017-2019), and six-time U.S. champion (2017-2022) in figure skating

== Heads and Deans ==
Heads of JE	Term
Robert D. French	1930–1953
Stuart Robert Brinkley (acting)	1951–52
William Huse Dunham, Jr.	1956-61
Beekman C. Cannon	1961–74
Jacques E. H. Guicharnaud (acting)	1967–68
Rosemary A. Stevens	1974–75
E. J. Boell (acting)	1976–77
H. Catherine W. Skinner	1977–82
Frederic Lawrence Holmes	1982–87
Bernard Lytton	1987–97
Gary Haller	1997–2008
Penelope Laurans	2009–2016
W. Mark Saltzman	2016–2022
Paul North	2022–2024
W. Mark Saltzman	2024–

Deans of JE	Term
Joseph T. Curtiss	1963–65
Robert E. Kuehn	1965–74
James Malachy Morris	1971–75
Mark B. Ryan	1976–96
Penelope Laurans (acting)	1986
Christos Cabolis (acting)	July-Dec 1995
Christos Cabolis	1997–2002
John Mangan	2002–2006
Kyle Farley	2006–2012
Connor Frailey (acting)	2012
Joseph C. Spooner	2012–2016
Christina Ferando	2016–2024
Yaser Robles	2024-

In 2016, the title of "Master" was changed to "Head of College"
