= San Francisco Bay Area Film Critics Circle Award for Best Adapted Screenplay =

Annual US film award

The San Francisco Film Critics Circle Award for Best Adapted Screenplay is given by the San Francisco Film Critics Circle (since 2006).

== Winners ==
=== 2000s ===
Year	Winner	Writer(s)	Source
2006	Little Children	Todd Field and Tom Perrotta	novel by Tom Perrotta
2007	Away from Her	Sarah Polley	short story by Alice Munro
2008	Frost/Nixon	Peter Morgan	play by Peter Morgan
2009	Fantastic Mr. Fox	Wes Anderson and Noah Baumbach	novel by Roald Dahl

=== 2010s ===
Year	Winner	Writer(s)	Source
2010	The Social Network	Aaron Sorkin	novel by Ben Mezrich
2011	Tinker Tailor Soldier Spy	Bridget O'Connor and Peter Straughan	novel by John le Carré
2012	Lincoln	Tony Kushner	novel by Doris Kearns Goodwin
2013	12 Years a Slave	John Ridley	memoir by Solomon Northup
2014	Inherent Vice	Paul Thomas Anderson	novel by Thomas Pynchon
2015	Brooklyn	Nick Hornby	novel by Colm Tóibín
2016	Arrival	Eric Heisserer	short story by Ted Chiang
2017	Call Me by Your Name	James Ivory	novel by André Aciman
2018	BlacKkKlansman	Charlie Wachtel, David Rabinowitz, Kevin Willmott, and Spike Lee	memoir by Ron Stallworth
2019	Jojo Rabbit	Taika Waititi	book by Christine Leunens
