= H. Catherine W. Skinner =

American geologist and mineralogist

- Born: Helen Catherine Wild; January 25, 1931; Brooklyn, New York, US
- Died: July 30, 2025 (aged 94); Southbury, Connecticut, US
- Occupations: Geologist, mineralogist

Helen Catherine Wild Skinner (January 25, 1931 – July 30, 2025) was an American geologist and mineralogist who was a pioneer of medical geology, the study of the impact of geological factors on human and animal health. She was an elected fellow of several professional organizations, the first woman president of the Connecticut Academy of Arts and Sciences, and the first woman to complete a term as head of a Yale residential college.

== Education ==
Skinner earned her bachelor's of science from Mount Holyoke College in 1952 and her master's of science from Radcliffe College in 1954. She then studied mineralogy at the University of Adelaide, receiving her PhD in 1959.

== Career ==
From 1961 to 1965, Skinner was a faculty mineralogist at the National Institute of Arthritis and Musculoskeletal and Skin Diseases. She became a faculty mineralogist at the National Institute of Dental Research in 1965. In both positions, she educated biochemists and biologists about mineralogy and crystallography. Skinner joined the faculty of Yale University in 1972, where she remained for the rest of her career. She was a research scientist in the department of geology and geophysics in addition to serving as a biomedical surgery lecturer and research associate at the Yale School of Medicine.

Her work focused on mineralogy and crystallography, particularly in dentistry and orthopedics. Early in her career, she studied phosphates, including dolomite and the "dolomite problem." She was a leader in the study of asbestos, and in 1988 she coauthored Asbestos and Other Fibrous Materials: Mineralogy, Crystal Chemistry and Health Effects. The book was well-received because it "shed light on a difficult and complex problem where disparate fields such as mineralogy, epidemiology, pathology, and statistics are involved."

Throughout her career, Skinner wrote and edited several works that were foundational in the establishment of medical geology, including Geology and Health: Closing the Gap, which was the result of a meeting of over 60 scientists sponsored by the International Union of Geological Sciences, UNESCO, and the Royal Swedish Academy of Sciences. William Fyfe called the book a "classic on an urgent topic."

From 1977 to 1982, Skinner served as head of Jonathan Edwards College, becoming the first woman to complete a term as head of a residential college at Yale. During her term, she was active in campus efforts to support women faculty and students. For example, she established a professional woman's group that met monthly for forty years.

Skinner was associate editor of American Mineralogist from 1977 to 1983 and served on the council of the Mineralogical Society of America from 1978 to 1981. Additionally, she was a leader in the National Academy of Sciences, chairing the committee on research priorities for earth science and public health and co-chairing the panel on geochemical fibrous material related health risks.

From 1985 to 1995, Skinner served as the first woman president of the Connecticut Academy of Arts and Sciences. During her tenure, she focused on increasing the number of women members, offering a broader variety of programming to attract diverse audiences, and expanding membership of the council to include Connecticut universities other than Yale.

Skinner recorded an oral history for the women at Yale project in 2007. During her interview, she discussed her experiences as a woman in a male-dominated field and the early years of coeducation at Yale. As of 2026, the recording is fully available online.

== Awards and recognition ==
In 1991, Skinner received the distinguished public service medal from the Mineralogical Society of America. She was a fellow of the Geological Society of America and an elected fellow of the American Association for the Advancement of Science.

Skinner received the alumnae achievement award from her undergraduate alma mater Mount Holyoke College in 2012.

== Selected publications ==
- Skinner, H. Catherine W., Malcolm Ross, and Clifford Frondel. Asbestos and Other Fibrous Materials: Mineralogy, Crystal Chemistry and Health Effects. Oxford University Press, 1988.
- Gaines, Richard V., H. Catherine W. Skinner, et al. (eds.). Dana's New Mineralogy: The System of Mineralogy of James Dwight Dana and Edward Salisbury Dana. 8th edition, Wiley, 1997.
- Skinner, H. Catherine W. and Antony R. Berger (eds.). Geology and Health: Closing the Gap. Oxford University Press, 2003.
- Skinner, H. Catherine. W. "Mineralogy of Asbestos Minerals." Indoor + Built Environment, 12:6 (2003), pp. 385–389.
- Sahai, Nita, Martin A. A. Schoonen, and H. Catherine W. Skinner. "The Emergent Field of Medical Mineralogy and Geology". Reviews in Mineralogy and Geochemistry 64 (2006), pp. 1-4.
- Skinner, H. Catherine W. "The Earth, Source of Health and Hazards: An Introduction to Medical Geology." Annual Review of Earth and Planetary Sciences 35:1 (2007), pp. 177–213.
- Skinner, H. Catherine W. "Mineralogy of Bones." In O. Selinus (ed.), Essentials of Medical Geology (2013), pp. 665-687.
