= HBRA (disambiguation) =

HBRA is a U.S. architecture firm. It may also refer to:

- High background radiation area; see Medical geology
- Human rights-based approach to lawmaking; see Climate change and poverty
- Harbor Beach Resort Association, in Michigan, U.S.
