= Michael Arndt =

American screenwriter

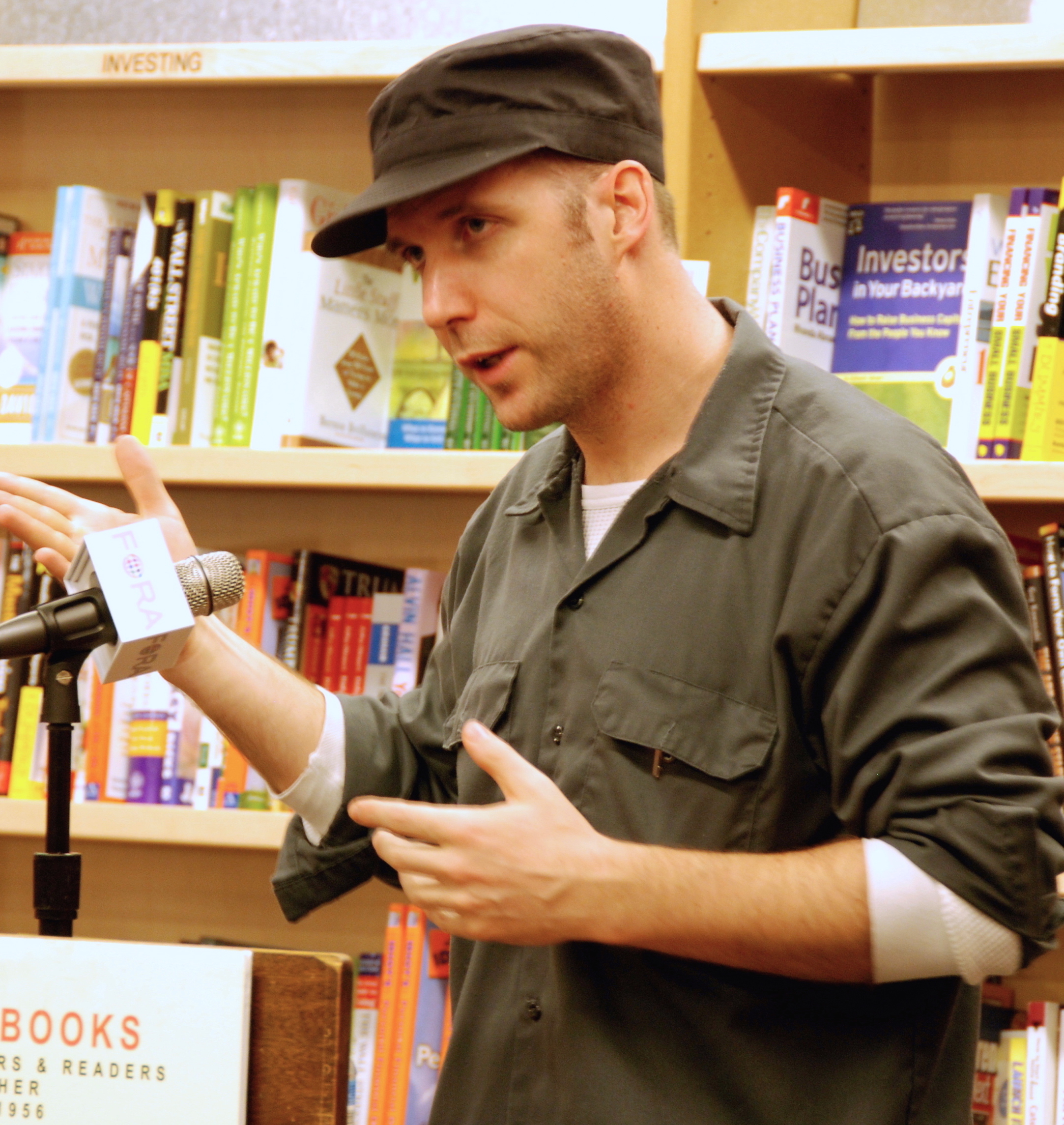
- Arndt in 2007
- Born: McLean, Virginia, U.S.
- Education: New York University
- Occupation: Screenwriter
- Writing career
- Pen name: Michael deBruyn
- Years active: 1997–present
- Notable works: Little Miss Sunshine; Toy Story 3; The Hunger Games: Catching Fire; Star Wars: The Force Awakens; The Hunger Games: The Ballad of Songbirds & Snakes
- Notable awards: Academy Award for Best Original Screenplay; Little Miss Sunshine (2006)

Michael Arndt is an American screenwriter, who has written for the films Little Miss Sunshine (2006), Toy Story 3 (2010), The Hunger Games: Catching Fire (2013), and Star Wars: The Force Awakens (2015).

Arndt won the Academy Award for Best Original Screenplay for Little Miss Sunshine and was nominated for Best Adapted Screenplay for Toy Story 3. This made Arndt the first screenwriter ever to be nominated for both the Academy Award for Best Original Screenplay and Best Adapted Screenplay for his first two screenplays.

He has also been credited under the pseudonyms Michael deBruyn and Rick Kerb, which are mainly used for script revisions.

== Early life and education ==
Arndt was born in McLean, Virginia. Arndt's father was a member of the Foreign Service, and as a result he lived in various countries, including Sri Lanka and India; he also lived in Virginia for a time. Arndt graduated from Langley High School in McLean, and also attended The Potomac School. He graduated from the Tisch School of the Arts at New York University. Arndt was a script reader for some time, and was a personal assistant to actor Matthew Broderick until late 1999, when he chose to begin writing screenplays full-time.

== Screenwriting career ==
"I figured I'd probably write 50 scripts in my life. Out of those 50, I figured maybe five would be produced, and that maybe one or two would be successful. So I always kind of expected I'd write at least one successful film in my life. [...] The way it all came together was kind of like Murphy's law in reverse—I don't expect that kind of experience again any time soon."

— Michael Arndt

Arndt wrote the first draft of Little Miss Sunshine in three days between May 23–26, 2000. From that initial draft, he made approximately 100 revisions over the course of a year, requesting input from friends and family. Arndt considered directing the film himself "as a no-budget, DV feature" due to his concern of the story being "just too small and "indie" to get any real attention from Hollywood". After the Endeavor Talent Agency read the script in July 2001, however, producers Albert Berger and Ron Yerxa subsequently gave the script to commercial and music video directors Jonathan Dayton and Valerie Faris, who were immediately attracted to the project. Dayton and Faris were signed on by producer Marc Turtletaub, who purchased the script from Arndt for $250,000, on December 21, 2001.

The project was set up at Focus Features, where it was in various stages of pre-production for approximately three years. During that time, Arndt was fired when he objected to centralizing the story on Richard Hoover (played by Greg Kinnear in the film), only to be re-hired within a month after the new writer hired by Focus left the project. Arndt resumed work on the script, which continued through production and into post-production: "The final scene of the movie [...] was written and shot about eight weeks before [its premiere at the Sundance Film Festival on January 20, 2006]", he said. Following its theatrical release on August 18, 2006, Little Miss Sunshine won many prizes and awards. Arndt won multiple Best Original Screenplay awards for Little Miss Sunshine, from the Academy of Motion Picture Arts and Sciences, the British Academy of Film and Television Arts, and the Writers Guild of America. He was later invited to join the Academy of Motion Picture Arts and Sciences.

Arndt began collaborating with Lee Unkrich and other Pixar personnel on the screenplay for Toy Story 3 in 2006, working from a treatment by Andrew Stanton, who co-wrote the two preceding films in the series. He was nominated for Best Adapted Screenplay for his work, and became the first ever screenwriter to be nominated for both Academy Awards for Best Original Screenplay and Best Adapted Screenplay for his first two screenplays.

Arndt was one of several screenwriters brought on to perform script revisions for Men in Black 3.

Arndt wrote the script for The Hunger Games sequel, The Hunger Games: Catching Fire, based on the best-selling novel of the same name by Suzanne Collins. Ten years later, he co-wrote the screenplay to the Hunger Games prequel, The Hunger Games: The Ballad of Songbirds & Snakes.

In November 2012, Arndt was announced as the screenwriter for Star Wars: The Force Awakens. In October 2013, it was announced that Lawrence Kasdan and director J. J. Abrams were rewriting Arndt's script.

== Filmography ==
Writer

Year	Title	Director	Notes
2006	Little Miss Sunshine	Jonathan Dayton; Valerie Faris	
2010	Toy Story 3	Lee Unkrich	
2013	Oblivion	Joseph Kosinski	Credited as Michael deBruyn
2013	The Hunger Games: Catching Fire	Francis Lawrence	Credited as Michael deBruyn
2015	A Walk in the Woods	Ken Kwapis	Credited as Rick Kerb
2015	Star Wars: The Force Awakens	J. J. Abrams	
2023	The Hunger Games: The Ballad of Songbirds & Snakes	Francis Lawrence	

Assistant

- Addicted to Love (1997)
- Inspector Gadget (1999)

Senior creative team

- WALL-E (2008)
- Up (2009) (Uncredited)
- Toy Story 3 (2010)
- Cars 2 (2011)

== Awards and nominations ==
Year	Title	Award/Nomination
2006	Little Miss Sunshine	Academy Award for Best Original Screenplay; BAFTA Award for Best Original Screenplay; Broadcast Film Critics Association Award for Best Writer; Dallas–Fort Worth Film Critics Association Award for Best Screenplay; Independent Spirit Award for Best First Screenplay; Kansas City Film Critics Circle Award for Best Original Screenplay; Phoenix Film Critics Society Award for Best Original Screenplay; Southeastern Film Critics Association Award for Best Original Screenplay; Washington D.C. Area Film Critics Association Award for Best Original Screenplay; Writers Guild of America Award for Best Original Screenplay; Los Angeles Film Critics Association Award for New Generation Award; Palm Springs International Film Festival for Chairman's Vanguard Award; Nominated–Chicago Film Critics Association Award for Best Original Screenplay; Nominated–London Critics Circle Film Award for Screenwriter of the Year; Nominated–Online Film Critics Society Award for Best Original Screenplay
2010	Toy Story 3	Nominated–Academy Award for Best Adapted Screenplay; Nominated–Annie Award for Writing in a Feature Production; Nominated–BAFTA Award for Best Adapted Screenplay; Nominated–Bradbury Award; Nominated–Broadcast Film Critics Association Award for Best Adapted Screenplay; Nominated–Chicago Film Critics Association Award for Best Adapted Screenplay; Nominated–Hugo Award for Best Dramatic Presentation - Long Form; Nominated–San Diego Film Critics Society Award for Best Original Screenplay; Nominated–Satellite Award for Best Original Screenplay; Nominated–Saturn Award for Best Writing; Nominated–Scream Award for Best Scream-Play; Nominated–Washington D.C. Area Film Critics Association Award for Best Adapted Screenplay
2013	The Hunger Games: Catching Fire	Nominated–Bradbury Award; Nominated–Hugo Award for Best Dramatic Presentation - Long Form
2015	Star Wars: The Force Awakens	Saturn Award for Best Writing; Nominated–Bradbury Award; Nominated–Hugo Award for Best Dramatic Presentation - Long Form
