= Tracy Flick =

Fictional character from Election

- Election character
- Reese Witherspoon as Tracy Flick
- First appearance: Election (1998)
- Created by: Tom Perrotta
- Portrayed by: Reese Witherspoon
- Voiced by: Lucy Liu (audiobook)

In-universe information
- Gender: Female
- Occupation: High School Student
- Relatives: Judith Flick (mother, portrayed by Colleen Camp)

Tracy Enid Flick is a fictional character who is the subject of the 1998 novel Election by Tom Perrotta and portrayed by Reese Witherspoon in the 1999 film adaptation of the same title. She is a smart, ambitious high school student whose quest to win a school election is nearly derailed by her teacher. She is the main antagonist in both the book and film.

Witherspoon's performance as Tracy was widely acclaimed by critics and garnered her multiple awards and nominations, including a Golden Globe nod. The character has since become an icon, as her driven, focused personality and unpopularity among her peers have led to comparisons with many real-life public figures, particularly female politicians such as Hillary Clinton.

Tracy Flick is the titular character in Tom Perrotta's 2022 novel Tracy Flick Can't Win, a sequel to Election. In the audiobook of the 2022 novel, the character is voiced by Lucy Liu.

== Overview ==
=== Election ===
Tracy is an ambitious high school junior, preparing for an easy election to the office of student body president after three years of extracurricular toil. Her assumption that she will be unopposed is dashed when two challengers enter the race: friendly and popular athlete Paul Metzler, sidelined from the football team by a skiing accident, and Paul's younger adopted sister Tammy, a moody, sarcastic rebel. Paul has been coaxed into running by election supervisor Jim McAllister, a civics teacher nursing a deep resentment toward Tracy since Jim's best friend and fellow teacher lost his job after his inappropriate sexual relationship with Tracy was discovered.

As the race continues and Paul's effortless popularity jeopardizes Tracy's once sure victory, Tracy's frustration drives her to commit an act of sabotage against his campaign, ripping down his posters right before election day. Despite Jim's conviction of her guilt, she escapes punishment through a stroke of pure luck when Tammy claims responsibility for the crime and is subsequently expelled, which was her objective in "confessing." Tracy wins the election despite Jim's attempt at sabotage, and goes on to attend Georgetown University, her dream school. She is later seen in Washington, D.C., working closely alongside a Republican congressman from Nebraska.

=== Tracy Flick Can't Win ===
Tracy started law school, but had to drop out to tend to her mother, who became sick with multiple sclerosis. As a graduate student, Tracy also became pregnant during an affair with a professor named Daniel, and opted not to have an abortion per her mother's request. Tracy then became a substitute teacher, and eventually became vice principal of her high school. When the position of school principal came open, she found herself forced to maneuver through various political tides in her effort to obtain the position. Although school board members planned to give the job to a former football coach, in the aftermath of a shooting at the school, they end up giving Tracy the promotion.

== Film adaptation of Election ==
Witherspoon as Tracy, greeting students during her election campaign

In the late 1990s, following her starring roles in the 1996 dramas Fear and Freeway, Witherspoon found herself in an unexpected career slump that led her to change direction. "All my serious dramatic performances suddenly weren't getting me the jobs or opportunities that I really wanted," she said in a 2005 interview. "I have stacks and stacks of letters from great directors saying I can't cast you because you don't mean anything to the studios. That's why I turned the boat toward comedy."

Election's director Alexander Payne was eager to cast Witherspoon, based on her performances in Freeway and The Man in the Moon, and she was equally eager to sign on to the project—but not to play Tracy. Witherspoon was drawn to the part of Tammy Metzler, the cynical outcast who becomes the election's dark horse presidential candidate. Referring to the scene in which Tammy delivers a shocking campaign speech denouncing the school's administration and the entire concept of elected student government, Witherspoon said, "That speech alone made me want to play Tammy! So I was terribly conflicted."

To play Tracy, Witherspoon developed a distinct speech pattern combining strident intonations with a chipper Midwestern accent. She also worked on clenching her facial muscles and maintaining a clipped walking pace. "That was just Tracy; it so escapes me how it came out!" she said. "I just imagined how uptight people carry themselves, and they grind their teeth at night and they clench their jaw because everything has to be just perfect." Of Witherspoon's performance, her co-star Matthew Broderick said, "From the first she knew exactly what she wanted—a very aggressive person in a small and cute package... she comes out very funny and very scary at the same time."

Witherspoon's performance received widespread critical acclaim, as well as her first Golden Globe Award nomination and several other accolades. But she later said that her career struggles continued after Election due to public confusion between her and Tracy. "I'm not Tracy Flick. I couldn't get jobs for a year after that because people thought I was that crazy and angry and controlling and strange."

Roger Ebert began his review of Election, "I remember students like Tracy Flick, the know-it-all who always has her hand in the air, while the teacher desperately looks for someone else to call on. In fact, I was a student like Tracy Flick." He goes on to compare Tracy to Elizabeth Dole: "a person who always seems to be presenting you with a logical puzzle for which she is the answer... She is always perfectly dressed and groomed, and is usually able to conceal her hot temper behind a facade of maddening cheerfulness. But she is ruthless. She reminds me of a saying attributed to David Merrick: 'It is not enough for me to win. My enemies must lose.'"

=== Awards and nominations for Witherspoon ===
Award	Title	Result
American Comedy Awards, USA	Funniest Actress in a Motion Picture (Leading Role)	Nominated
Chicago Film Critics Association Awards	Best Actress	Nominated
Golden Globe Awards	Best Performance by an Actress in a Motion Picture – Comedy/Musical	Nominated
Independent Spirit Awards	Best Female Lead	Nominated
Kansas City Film Critics Circle Awards	Best Actress	Won
Las Vegas Film Critics Society Awards	Best Actress	Nominated
National Society of Film Critics Awards	Best Actress	Won
Online Film Critics Society Awards	Best Actress	Won
Golden Satellite Awards	Best Performance by an Actress in a Motion Picture, Comedy or Musical	Nominated
Southeastern Film Critics Association Awards	Best Actress	Nominated
Teen Choice Awards	Film – Choice Hissy Fit	Nominated

== Real-world comparisons ==
A 2006 profile of the character in The Washington Post called her "wonderfully monstrous." "In Payne's study of her pathologies, Tracy's will is so fiery and her perfection so total that no one dares stand against her in her goal." The Stranger wrote, "Like Humbert Humbert, the Reverend Harry Powell, and Baby Jane Hudson before her, Tracy Flick is a real and lasting contribution to the cinematic understanding of the villain, and the feather in Witherspoon's cap."

Tracy has often been a point of comparison in commentary on real-world political figures. Hillary Clinton has more than once been compared to her. In a January 2008 video mashup produced by Slate, campaign footage of Clinton was combined with clips from Election to draw a comparison between Clinton's and Tracy's feelings about the inferiority of their opponents. The video was widely circulated and praised.

A Christian Science Monitor review of Clinton's 2003 autobiography, Living History, quoted an excerpt in which Clinton discussed her participation during high school in a Cultural Values Committee and noted, "There is obviously some truth here, but the tone of the passage reeks of Tracy Flick, the overachieving, overly serious high school student from the film Election. Not to belittle the efforts of the Cultural Values Committee, but a brief aside to show that Clinton understands that high school sociopolitics is not exactly on par with race relations would be nice."

In 2008, after Clinton's defeat for the Democratic presidential nomination, multiple commentators likened Tracy to the Republican vice-presidential nominee, Alaska governor Sarah Palin. Actress and comedian Tina Fey credited Witherspoon's performance as Tracy as an influence for Fey's extremely popular, Emmy-winning impersonation of Palin on Saturday Night Live.

In the late 2010s, in the wake of the MeToo movement, some critics began reevaluating the character, noting that Flick, an inexperienced underage girl, was the victim of child grooming by one teacher, and subjected to an effort to deny her legitimate election win by another, as revenge for her part in revealing the misconduct of the first.

== As a cultural icon ==
Tracy Flick has been included on a 2007 mtv.com list of "our 10 favorite high school archetypes from the movies" (as "The Annoying Overachiever"); a 2008 New York Daily News list of "high-school fast-talkers before Charlie Bartlett"; and a 2008 E! Online list of "the top 9 creepiest movie bad guys." TV writer Dan Harmon has also said in interviews and on his podcast that she was the inspiration for the character Annie Edison on Community.
