= Scott Ellaway =

British conductor

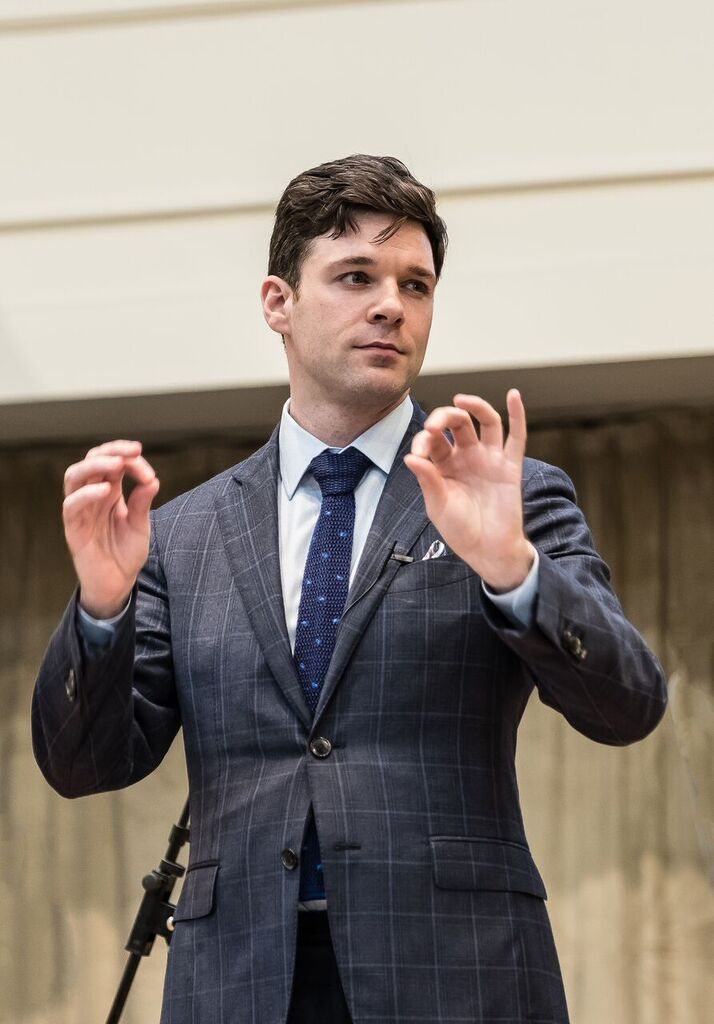
- Born: Scott Tereance Ellaway; 8 August 1981 (age 45); Abergavenny, South Wales
- Education: Keble College, Oxford
- Occupation: Conductor
- Years active: 2002–present
- Website: www.scottellaway.com

Scott Tereance Ellaway (born 8 August 1981) is a British conductor. In an article published by BBC Music Magazine in 2009, Ellaway became known for his entrepreneurial spirit as the founder and artistic director of Orchestra Europa. In 2011 John Spencer-Churchill, 11th Duke of Marlborough hosted a concert at Blenheim Palace to celebrate the conductor's 30th birthday. Ellaway is also the founder of OpusYou, a music education platform.

== Early life and education ==
Born in Abergavenny, South Wales, Ellaway was educated locally before gaining an organ scholarship to Keble College, Oxford, in 2002, graduating in 2005. During this time, he was elected to membership of the Royal College of Organists. He is a Fellow at Jonathan Edwards College, Yale University.

== Career ==
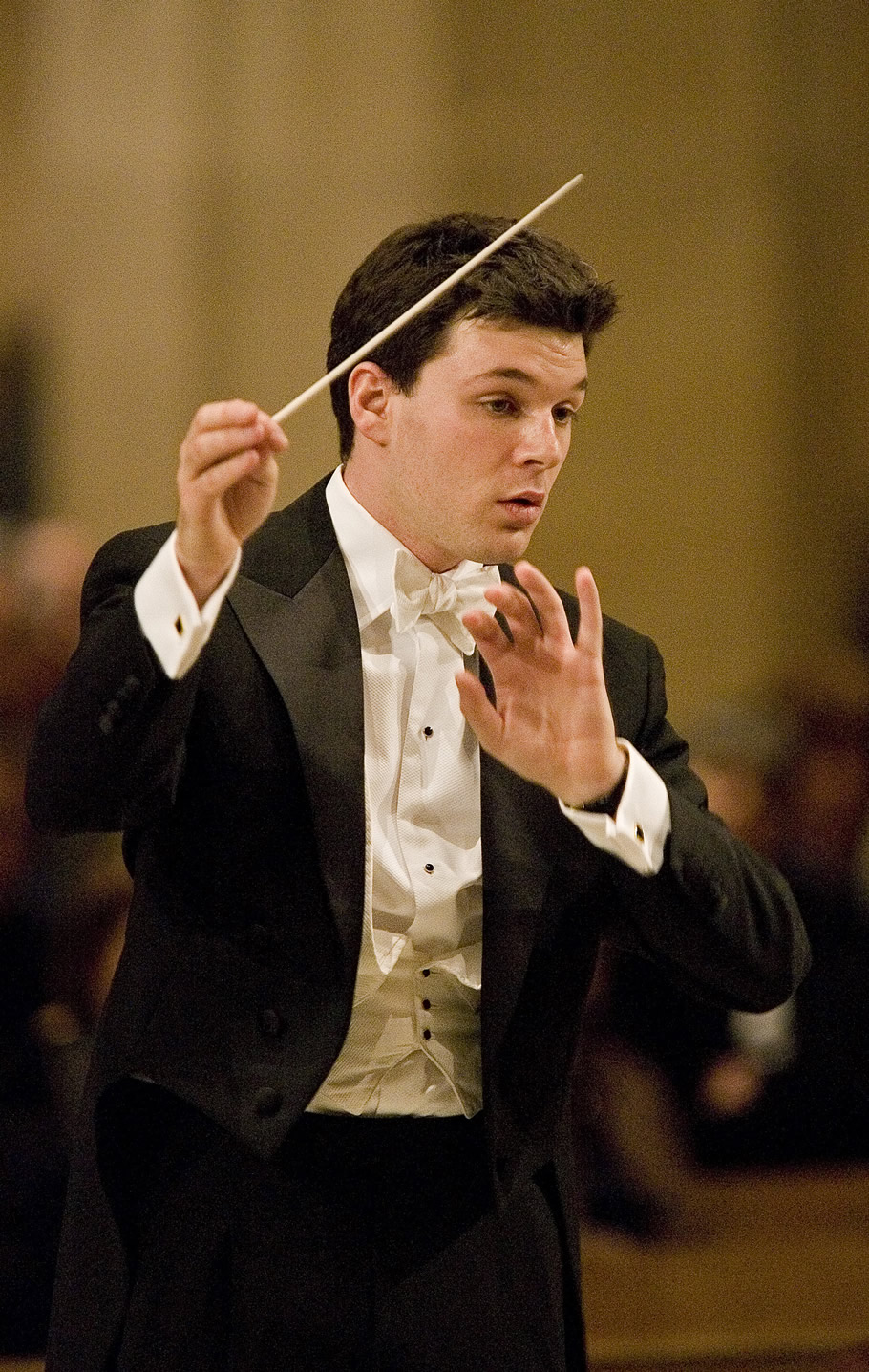
Scott Ellaway conducting the Philharmonia Orchestra in Guildford (18 March 2006)

He made his professional conducting debut at age 21 with members of the BBC National Orchestra of Wales and the Welsh National Opera in Abergavenny. He has since worked with several prominent orchestras and ensembles including the Academy of Ancient Music, the BBC Singers, the Berliner Symphoniker, the Philharmonia Orchestra, the London Mozart Players, and performed at the Lincoln Center in New York City for the first time in 2014, conducting performances of George Balanchine's Concerto Barocco, Kammermusik No. 2 and Who Cares? for the New York City Ballet. He made his debut with the London Symphony Orchestra at the Henry Wood Hall in June 2016. He has worked with opera companies including the Lyric Opera of Chicago.

During the COVID-19 pandemic, Ellaway was involved in broadcast-based performances and educational initiatives in Los Angeles, including projects produced in collaboration with Gravity Media.

== Discography ==
- Sweet, Sacred Feast! (2015), Oratory Choir of St Boniface, Brooklyn
