= Rosemary A. Stevens =

Historian of American medicine and health policy

- Born: 1935 (age 90–91)
- Occupation: Historian
- Spouse: Jack D. Barchas (married 1994–present)
- Parents: William E. Wallace (father); Mary A. Wallace (mother)

Rosemary A. Stevens (born 1935) is a historian of American medicine and health policy.

== Education ==
Stevens received her Bachelor of Arts from St. Hilda's College and Master of Arts from Oxford University. She received her MPH in health services administration and policy and Ph.D. in epidemiology from Yale University.

== Career ==
After completing her MPH, Stevens oversaw a 100-bed hospital in London. She has since has held a number of academic positions including posts at Yale University Medical School and Tulane University. In 1974, Stevens was named head of Jonathan Edwards College, becoming the first woman appointed to head a Yale residential college in her own right.

At the University of Pennsylvania, she was Stanley I. Sheerr Professor in Arts and Sciences and served as dean of the School of Arts and Sciences, the first woman to hold the latter position. Stevens is a Senior Fellow in the Leonard Davis Institute of Health Economics and professor emerita of History and Sociology of Science in the School of Arts and Sciences.

As of 2017, Stevens is DeWitt Wallace Distinguished Scholar in Social Medicine and Public Policy at the Weill Cornell Medical College.

== Awards and honors ==
Stevens was named a Guggenheim Fellow in 1983. In 1997, she received an Investigator Award from the Robert Wood Johnson Foundation for her work on specialization in American medicine. She's also a recipient of the William B. Graham Prize for Health Services Research and a fellow of the American Academy of Arts and Sciences. In 2011 she gave the American Osler Society's John P. Govern Award Lecture.

== Griswold v. Connecticut ==
Stevens served as a witness in the landmark 1965 case Griswold v. Connecticut, which established the rights of married couples to use contraceptives without government interference. She recorded a C-SPAN interview and wrote an article about the experience.

== Selected publications ==
- Stevens, Rosemary (2007). The Public-Private Health Care State: Essays on the History of American Health Care Policy. New Brunswick: Transaction Publishers. ISBN 978-1-4128-0968-9. OCLC 773038791 – via Google Books.
- Stevens, Rosemary A. (2006). "Medical Specialization as American Health Policy: Interweaving Public and Private Roles". In Stevens, Rosemary A.; Rosenberg, Charles E.; Burns, Lawton R. (eds.). History and Health Policy in the United States: Putting the Past Back In. New Brunswick, NJ: Rutgers University Press. pp. 49–79. ISBN 978-0-8135-3837-2. OCLC 896993962 – via Google Books.
