= List of accolades received by Little Miss Sunshine =

Little Miss Sunshine received numerous awards and honors from film organizations, film festivals, and critics groups. The 2006 film was commended for its ensemble cast, individual roles, screenplay, and other aspects of the film.

== Organizations ==
Organization	Category	Recipient	Result	Ref
Academy Awards	Best Picture	David T. Friendly, Peter Saraf and Marc Turtletaub	Nominated	
Academy Awards	Best Performance by an Actor in a Supporting Role	Alan Arkin	Won	
Academy Awards	Best Performance by an Actress in a Supporting Role	Abigail Breslin	Nominated	
Academy Awards	Best Original Screenplay	Michael Arndt	Won	
American Cinema Editors	Best Edited Feature Film – Comedy or Musical	Pamela Martin	Nominated	
American Film Institute	Movie of the Year		Won	
BAFTA Award	Best Film		Nominated	
BAFTA Award	Best Original Screenplay	Michael Arndt	Won	
BAFTA Award	Best Actor in a Supporting Role	Alan Arkin	Won	
BAFTA Award	Best Actress in a Supporting Role	Abigail Breslin	Nominated	
BAFTA Award	Best Actress in a Supporting Role	Toni Collette	Nominated	
BAFTA Award	Best Direction	Jonathan Dayton and Valerie Faris	Nominated	
César Awards	Best Foreign Film		Won	
Costume Designers Guild	Best Costume Design — Contemporary Film	Nancy Steiner	Nominated	
Directors Guild of America Award	Outstanding Directorial Achievement in Motion Pictures	Jonathan Dayton and Valerie Faris	Nominated	
GLAAD Media Award	Outstanding Film — Wide Release		Won	
Golden Globe Award	Best Motion Picture - Musical or Comedy		Nominated	
Golden Globe Award	Best Performance by an Actress in a Motion Picture - Musical or Comedy	Toni Collette	Nominated	
Gotham Awards	Best Ensemble Cast	Greg Kinnear, Steve Carell, Toni Collette, Paul Dano, Abigail Breslin and Alan Arkin	Nominated	
Gotham Awards	Breakthrough Actor	Abigail Breslin	Nominated	
Grammy Award	Best Compilation Soundtrack Album for Visual Media	Mychael Danna	Nominated	
Independent Spirit Awards	Best Film		Won	
Independent Spirit Awards	Best First Screenplay	Michael Arndt	Won	
Independent Spirit Awards	Best Supporting Actor	Alan Arkin	Won	
Independent Spirit Awards	Best Supporting Actor	Paul Dano	Nominated	
Independent Spirit Awards	Best Director	Jonathan Dayton and Valerie Faris	Won	
Irish Film Award	Best International Film		Won	
MTV Movie Awards	Best Movie		Nominated	
MTV Movie Awards	Breakthrough Performance	Abigail Breslin	Nominated	
National Board of Review	Top Ten Films		Won	
Producers Guild of America	Best Theatrical Motion Picture	Marc Turtletaub, David T. Friendly, Peter Saraf, Albert Berger and Ron Yerxa	Won	
Satellite Award	Best Motion Picture		Nominated	
Satellite Award	Best Performance by an Actress in a Motion Picture - Musical or Comedy	Toni Collette	Nominated	
Satellite Award	Best Actor in a Supporting Role	Alan Arkin	Nominated	
Satellite Award	Best Actress in a Supporting Role	Abigail Breslin	Nominated	
Satellite Award	Best Original Song	Devotchka (for "Til the End of Time")	Nominated	
Screen Actors Guild Award	Outstanding Performance by a Cast in a Motion Picture	Greg Kinnear, Steve Carell, Toni Collette, Paul Dano, Abigail Breslin and Alan Arkin	Won	
Screen Actors Guild Award	Outstanding Performance by a Male Actor in a Supporting Role - Motion Picture	Alan Arkin	Nominated	
Screen Actors Guild Award	Outstanding Performance by a Female Actor in a Supporting Role - Motion Picture	Abigail Breslin	Nominated	
Women's Image Network	Outstanding Lead Actor Featured Film	Greg Kinnear	Nominated	
Writers Guild of America Award	Original Screenplay	Michael Arndt	Won	

== Film festivals ==
Organization	Category	Recipient	Result	Ref
Deauville Film Festival	Grand Special Prize		Won	
Palm Springs International Film Festival	Chairman's Vanguard Award		Won	
San Sebastián Film Festival	Audience Award		Won	
Sydney Film Festival	Best Feature – World Cinema		Won	
Tokyo International Film Festival	Audience Award		Won	
Tokyo International Film Festival	Best Actress – Motion Picture	Abigail Breslin	Won	
Tokyo International Film Festival	Best Director	Jonathan Dayton and Valerie Faris	Won	

== Critics groups ==
Organization	Category	Recipient	Result	Ref
Boston Society of Film Critics	Best New Filmmaker	Jonathan Dayton and Valerie Faris	Nominated	
Broadcast Film Critics Association	Best Film		Nominated	
Broadcast Film Critics Association	Best Comedy Movie		Nominated	
Broadcast Film Critics Association	Best Ensemble Cast	Greg Kinnear, Steve Carell, Toni Collette, Paul Dano, Abigail Breslin and Alan Arkin	Won	
Broadcast Film Critics Association	Best Young Actor	Paul Dano	Won	
Broadcast Film Critics Association	Best Young Actress	Abigail Breslin	Won	
Broadcast Film Critics Association	Best Supporting Actor	Alan Arkin	Nominated	
Broadcast Film Critics Association	Best Writer	Michael Arndt	Won	
Chicago Film Critics Association	Best Picture		Nominated	
Chicago Film Critics Association	Best Original Screenplay	Michael Arndt	Nominated	
Chicago Film Critics Association	Best Supporting Actress	Abigail Breslin	Nominated	
Chicago Film Critics Association	Best Supporting Actress	Toni Collette	Nominated	
Chicago Film Critics Association	Most Promising Director	Jonathan Dayton and Valerie Faris	Nominated	
Critics' Choice Awards	Best Picture		Nominated	
Critics' Choice Awards	Best Supporting Actor	Alan Arkin	Won	
Critics' Choice Awards	Best Young Actor	Paul Dano	Won	
Critics' Choice Awards	Best Young Actress	Abigail Breslin	Won	
Critics' Choice Awards	Best Writer	Michael Arndt	Won	
Critics' Choice Awards	Best Acting Ensemble		Won	
Critics' Choice Awards	Best Comedy		Nominated	
Dallas–Fort Worth Film Critics Association	Best Screenplay	Michael Arndt	Won	
London Film Critics Circle	Best Picture		Nominated	—N/a
London Film Critics Circle	Screenwriter of the Year	Michael Arndt	Nominated	—N/a
Los Angeles Film Critics Association	New Generation Award	Michael Arndt, Jonathan Dayton and Valerie Faris	Won	
Los Angeles Film Critics Association	Best Screenplay	Michael Arndt	Nominated	
Online Film Critics Society	Best Supporting Actress	Abigail Breslin	Won	
Online Film Critics Society	Best Breakthrough Filmmaker	Jonathan Dayton and Valerie Faris	Won	
St. Louis Gateway Film Critics Association	Best Picture		Nominated	—N/a
Vancouver Film Critics Circle	Best Supporting Actor	Alan Arkin	Won	
Vancouver Film Critics Circle	Best Supporting Actor	Steve Carell	Nominated	
Washington D.C. Area Film Critics Association	Best Ensemble Cast	Greg Kinnear, Steve Carell, Toni Collette, Paul Dano, Abigail Breslin and Alan Arkin	Won	
Washington D.C. Area Film Critics Association	Best Screenplay — Original	Michael Arndt	Won	
