= Tracy Flick Can't Win =

2022 novel by Tom Perrotta

- Author: Tom Perrotta
- Language: English
- Publisher: Scribner
- Publication date: June 7, 2022
- Publication place: United States
- Media type: Print (hardback), ebook, audiobook
- Pages: 272
- ISBN: 978-1-501-14406-6

Tracy Flick Can't Win is a 2022 novel by American author Tom Perrotta. It was published by Scribner and is a sequel to the 1998 novel Election. In the audiobook of the 2022 novel, Tracy Flick is voiced by Lucy Liu. A film adaptation is in works at Paramount+ with Reese Witherspoon set to reprise her role as Tracy and Alexander Payne set to direct.

== Synopsis ==
In the book, it is revealed that Tracy started law school, but had to drop out to tend to her mother, who became sick with multiple sclerosis. As a law student, Tracy also became pregnant during an affair with a professor named Daniel, and opted not to have an abortion per her mother's request. Tracy then became a substitute teacher, and eventually became vice principal of her high school. When the position of school principal came open, she found herself forced to maneuver through various political tides in her effort to obtain the position. Although school board members planned to give the job to a former football coach, in the aftermath of a shooting at the school, they end up giving Tracy the promotion.

== Film adaptation ==
A few months after the book's release, a film adaptation was announced for Paramount+ as a sequel to the 1999 Election film, with Reese Witherspoon reprising her role as Tracy and producing under her Hello Sunshine banner, Alexander Payne returning to direct, and Payne and Jim Taylor returning to write. A year later, while promoting The Holdovers (2023), Payne reiterated interest in the project, but would like to pursue other projects first. Payne said that he wants to make a loose adaptation of the novel with Taylor that included Broderick's Jim McAllister character, as well as divert from the high school setting of the novel, attributing to his aversion to:

...making another high school movie. I did Election. I did Holdovers. There are bits and pieces of it in Sideways, and a pilot I did, so I’m a little over it, so Jim and I are talking right now about how can we adapt that novel faithfully, but loosely, and put our own voice into it. We’ll get there. We’re not quite there, but we’ll get there.
