= The Abstinence Teacher =

2007 novel by Tom Perrotta

- First edition cover
- Author: Tom Perrotta
- Language: English
- Genre: Fiction
- Publisher: St. Martin's Press
- Publication date: October 16, 2007
- Publication place: United States
- Media type: Print (hardcover)
- Pages: 358 pp (1st edition, hardcover)
- ISBN: 0-312-35833-4 (1st edition, hardcover)
- OCLC: 138340958
- Dewey Decimal: 813/.54 22
- LC Class: PS3566.E6948 A66 2007b

The Abstinence Teacher is a 2007 novel by American author Tom Perrotta. It tells the story of Ruth Ramsey, a divorced sexual education teacher who lives in suburban New Jersey and comes into conflict with the town's conservative population. According to Perrotta, it is "all about sex education and the culture wars." He was inspired to write the novel after reading of the influence of evangelical voters on the 2004 presidential election, stating, "I did feel somewhat inadequate as a novelist, just like I'd missed something huge happening in this country. I really did set out to kind of investigate that world." The novel also touches on other issues such as homophobia and sexism in the suburban setting.

== Critical reception ==
Kirkus Reviews called the book "ruefully humorous and tenderly understanding of human folly." Publishers Weekly wrote that The Abstinence Teacher "is rife with Perrotta’s subtle and satiric humor."

== Film adaptation ==
Warner Independent Pictures purchased the film rights to the novel in September 2006, more than a year before it was published. As of October 2007, Perrotta was working on the screenplay, which, according to Perrotta's official site, was completed in 2008. The planned movie was originally supposed to be co-directed by Little Miss Sunshine directors Jonathan Dayton and Valerie Faris. The project was taken over by The Kids Are All Right director Lisa Cholodenko.
