= Jonathan Dayton and Valerie Faris =

American filmmakers

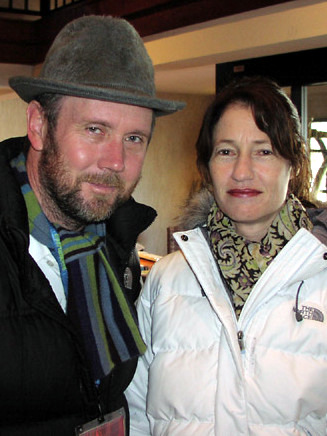
- Dayton and Faris in 2006
- Born: Jonathan Dayton; July 7, 1957 (age 69); Alameda County, California, U.S. Valerie Faris; October 20, 1958 (age 67); Los Angeles County, California, U.S.
- Education: UCLA School of Theater, Film and Television
- Occupations: Film directors, music video directors
- Notable work: Little Miss Sunshine; Ruby Sparks; Battle of the Sexes
- Children: 3

Jonathan Dayton (born July 7, 1957) and Valerie Faris (born October 20, 1958) are two American directors and producers for films and music videos. They started their career directing videos for such artists as Red Hot Chili Peppers, R.E.M. and the Smashing Pumpkins. Together they directed the films Little Miss Sunshine (2006), Ruby Sparks (2012), and Battle of the Sexes (2017). They also directed the Netflix comedy series Living with Yourself (2019) and episodes of the Hulu series Fleishman Is In Trouble (2022).

== Early life ==
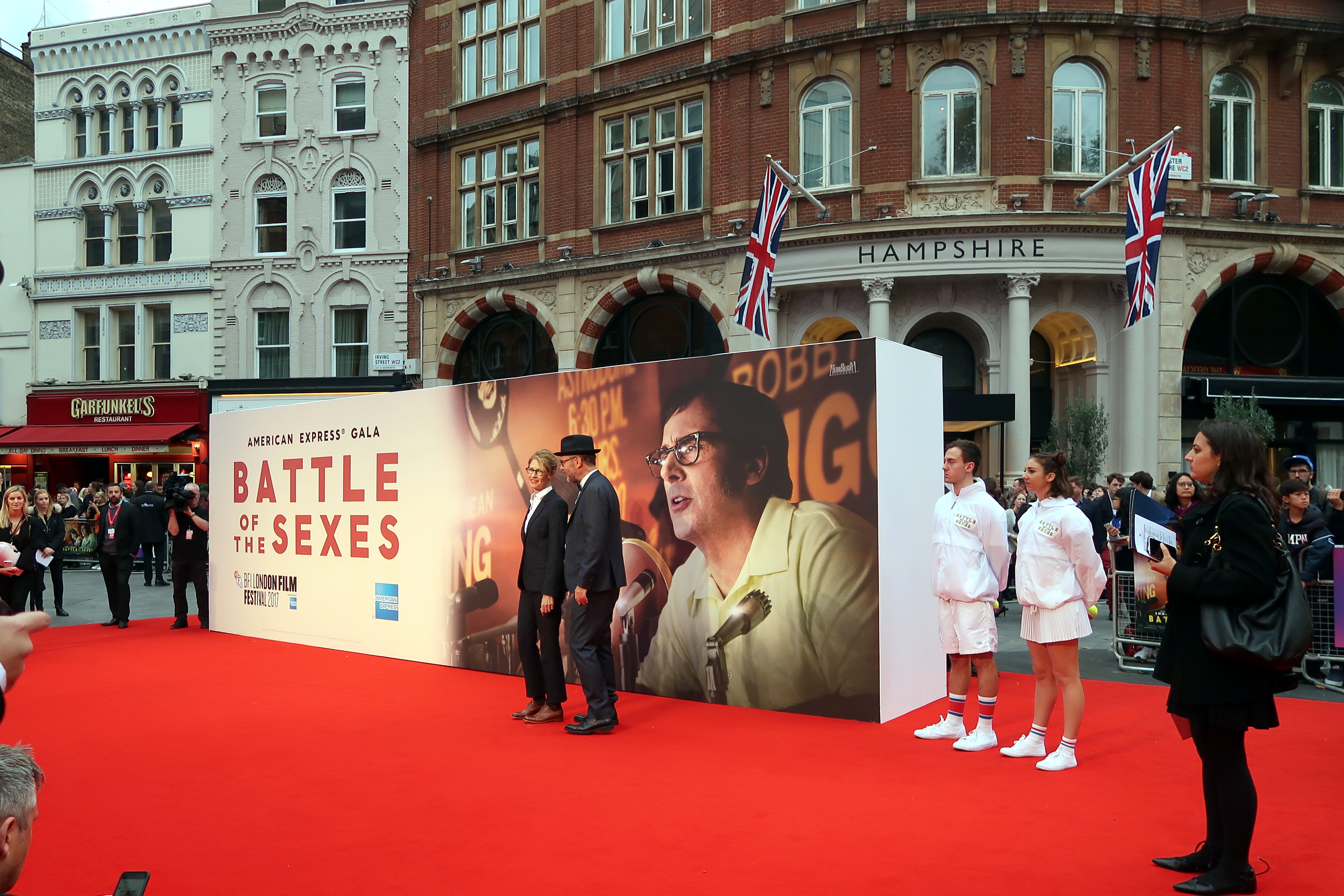
Valerie Faris and Jonathan Dayton on the red carpet at the Battle of the Sexes gala screening at the BFI London Film Festival 2017

Dayton was born in Alameda County, California, and grew up in Grass Valley, California. After graduating from Ygnacio Valley High School in Concord, California, he attended the UCLA School of Theater, Film and Television, in the late 1970s. Faris is a native of Los Angeles and the daughter of Paula Forbes, a supervising painter, and Jim Faris, a film editor. Faris met Dayton while attending UCLA as a dance student.

== Careers ==
As a pair, Dayton and Faris have directed and produced music videos, documentaries, commercials and films. They have directed music videos for bands such as Oasis, Red Hot Chili Peppers, Beastie Boys, and R.E.M. Their 1996 video for "Tonight, Tonight" by The Smashing Pumpkins won six MTV Video Music Awards. Another of their videos that found significant success was for the 1990 Extreme song "More Than Words".

They directed a number of sketches for the 1995-1998 HBO sketch comedy series Mr. Show.

In 1998, they established a production company, Bob Industries. Through this company the pair directed commercials for companies such as Hewlett-Packard, Volkswagen, Sony, GAP, Target, IKEA, Apple Computer, and ESPN. The two directed a 1999 commercial for the Volkswagen Cabrio, titled Milky Way, whose soundtrack consisted entirely of the 1972 Nick Drake song "Pink Moon", and which is credited with initiating a massive revival of interest in Nick Drake's music.

They began to be offered feature films to direct at around this time; among projects that they turned down were The Mod Squad (1999) and Bad Boys II (2003).

In 2001, they began to work on the film Little Miss Sunshine; it was released in 2006. The film won the Audience Award at the 2006 Sydney Film festival and an ovation at the 2006 Sundance Film Festival, and was nominated for an Academy Award for Best Picture. Their directing style for the film involved a high level of improvisation to allow the actors to create organic connections to the roles.

In 2006, the pair were announced as the directors of a planned screen adaptation of Tom Perrotta's novel The Abstinence Teacher for Warner Independent Pictures. In 2007 Perrotta wrote a screenplay with input from Dayton and Faris. However, by 2012 they had left the project, and it was taken over by director Lisa Cholodenko.

Their next film was Ruby Sparks in 2012. Dayton and Faris then directed Battle of the Sexes, about the tennis match between Billie Jean King and Bobby Riggs, with Emma Stone as King and Steve Carell as Riggs. The film also stars Elisabeth Shue, Alan Cumming, and Sarah Silverman; it was released in 2017.

== Personal life ==
Dayton and Faris married and began working as creative partners after meeting in college. They have three children together.

== Filmography ==
Directors

- Little Miss Sunshine (2006)
- Ruby Sparks (2012)
- Battle of the Sexes (2017)
- Living with Yourself (2019, 8 episodes)
- Fleishman Is in Trouble (2022, 3 episodes)
- Stick (2025, 2 episodes)

Producers

- The Decline of Western Civilization Part II: The Metal Years (1988)
- Gift (Jane's Addiction) (1993)

== Videography ==
Directors

- "Wolves, Lower", R.E.M. (1982)
- "Blue Kiss (Version 2)", Jane Wiedlin (1986)
- "Hole Hearted", Extreme (1991)
- "More Than Words", Extreme (1991)
- "Weight of the World", Ringo Starr (1992)
- "Bad Luck", Social Distortion (1992)
- "Pets", Porno for Pyros (1993)
- "Rocket", The Smashing Pumpkins (1994)
- "Gun", Soundgarden (1994)
- "I Don't Want to Grow Up", Ramones (1995)
- "Tongue", R.E.M. (1995)
- "Star 69", R.E.M. (1995)
- "The Good Life", Weezer (1996)
- "1979", The Smashing Pumpkins (1996)
- "Tonight, Tonight", The Smashing Pumpkins (1996)
- "Spider-Man", Ramones (1996)
- "All Around the World", Oasis (1997)
- "The End Is the Beginning Is the End", The Smashing Pumpkins (1997; co-directed with Joel Schumacher)
- "Perfect", The Smashing Pumpkins (1998)
- "She Will Have Her Way", Neil Finn (1998)
- "Go Deep", Janet Jackson (1998)
- "Barbarella", Scott Weiland (1998)
- "She's Got Issues", The Offspring (1999)
- "Freak on a Leash", KoЯn (1999; co-directed with Todd McFarlane and Graham Morris)
- "Road Trippin'", Red Hot Chili Peppers (2000)
- "Californication", Red Hot Chili Peppers (2000)
- "Otherside", Red Hot Chili Peppers (2000)
- "Sexual Revolution", Macy Gray (2001)
- "Sing", Travis (2001)
- "Side", Travis (2001)
- "When Your Eyes Say It", Britney Spears (2001) (unreleased)
- "The Zephyr Song", Red Hot Chili Peppers (2002)
- "By the Way", Red Hot Chili Peppers (2002)
- "Tell Me Baby", Red Hot Chili Peppers (2006)

Executive producers

- "Thirty-Three", The Smashing Pumpkins (1996)
- "The New Pollution", Beck (1997)

Producers

- "In My Darkest Hour", Megadeth (1988)
- "Hole Hearted", Extreme (1991)
- "More Than Words", Extreme (1991)
- "Outshined", Soundgarden (1991)

Live action directors

- "Shadrach", Beastie Boys (1989)

== Awards ==
- Directors Guild of America Award nomination for Little Miss Sunshine (Outstanding Directorial Achievement in Motion Pictures)
- BAFTA nomination for Little Miss Sunshine (David Lean Award for Direction)
- Independent Spirit Award for Little Miss Sunshine (Director)
- Best Director at Tokyo International Film Festival for Little Miss Sunshine
- ANDY Award for Sony PlayStation "Gravity Bomb" (Advertising Club of New York)
- Ratchet & Clank: Going Commando "Gravity Bomb" (Clio Award)
- Ratchet & Clank: Going Commando campaign: "Gravity Bomb / Tractor Beam" (2004 Winner Advertising Club of New York)
- Ratchet & Clank: Going Commando campaign: "Gravity Boots, Gravity Bomb, Tractor Beam" (Clio Award)
- Best Rock Video, "By the Way" (MTV Video Music Awards Japan, 2003)
- Director of the Year (Billboard Music Award, 2000)
- Best Direction, "Californication" (MTV Video Music Awards)
- 9 Nominations for "Freak On A Leash" (MTV Video Music Awards)
- 4 Nominations for The Smashing Pumpkins "The End Is The Beginning Is The End" (MTV Video Music Awards)
- 5 Nominations for "Californication" (MTV Video Music Awards)
- Best Short Form Video, "Freak On A Leash" (Grammy Awards)
- Nomination for Oasis "All Around the World" (Grammy Awards)
- Nomination for The Smashing Pumpkins "Tonight Tonight" (Grammy Awards)
- 6 Awards for The Smashing Pumpkins "Tonight Tonight" (MTV Video Music Awards)
- Best Alternative Video for The Smashing Pumpkins "1979" (MTV Video Music Awards)
- 3 Nominations for Porno for Pyros "Pets" (MTV Video Music Awards)
- Best Alternative Video for Jane's Addiction "Been Caught Stealing" (MTV Video Music Awards)
- Best Longform Video for Janet Jackson "Rhythm Nation 1814" (Grammy Awards)
