= Little Children (film) =

2006 film by Todd Field

- Theatrical release poster
- Directed by: Todd Field
- Screenplay by: Todd Field; Tom Perrotta
- Based on: Little Children by Tom Perrotta
- Produced by: Todd Field; Albert Berger; Ron Yerxa
- Starring: Kate Winslet; Jennifer Connelly; Patrick Wilson; Jackie Earle Haley; Noah Emmerich; Gregg Edelman; Phyllis Somerville
- Cinematography: Antonio Calvache
- Edited by: Leo Trombetta
- Music by: Thomas Newman
- Production companies: Bona Fide; Standard Film Company
- Distributed by: New Line Cinema
- Release date: October 6, 2006
- Running time: 136 minutes
- Country: United States
- Language: English
- Budget: $26 million
- Box office: $14.8 million

Little Children is a 2006 American satirical melodrama film directed by Todd Field, based on the 2004 novel by Tom Perrotta, who co-wrote the screenplay with Field. It follows Sarah Pierce (Kate Winslet), an unhappy housewife who has an affair with a married neighbor (Patrick Wilson). Also starring are Jennifer Connelly, Jackie Earle Haley, Noah Emmerich, Gregg Edelman, Phyllis Somerville, and Will Lyman.

Shooting began on July 25, 2005 and took place in various locations across the United States, primarily in New York City. The film premiered at the 44th New York Film Festival, and was released by New Line Cinema on October 6, 2006, on 5 screens, earning $145,946, with a $29,189 per-screen average. It was exhibited on a maximum of 32 screens throughout most of its run, briefly increasing to 109 screens in the few weeks leading up to the 79th Academy Awards. Despite the limited release, the film was favorably reviewed by critics, and won numerous critics' group prizes and received Oscar nominations for Best Actress for Winslet, Best Supporting Actor for Haley, and Best Adapted Screenplay for Field and Perrotta.

== Plot ==
Sarah Pierce lives with her husband Richard and daughter Lucy in suburban Boston. Their unhappy marriage falls apart when she discovers his addiction to Internet pornography. One day she meets Brad Adamson, a married law school graduate who brings his 4-year-old son Aaron to the park. Brad and Sarah become friendly and, on a dare to shock gossipy housewives, kiss in the park. They resolve not to act on their mutual attraction.

Sarah and Brad enjoy each other's company and start meeting at the public pool under the guise of play dates for their kids. One day, dozens of parents panic when they recognize recently paroled sex offender Ronnie J. McGorvey snorkeling in the water with the children. After Ronnie is escorted away by the police, the pool is closed due to rain. Sarah and Brad take Lucy and Aaron back to her house and put the kids to bed. While Sarah is drying towels in her basement, Brad comes down; they give in to their temptations and have sex.

Ronnie lives with his mother May, who believes that Ronnie's pedophilia would be cured if he met a woman his own age. He reluctantly agrees to go on a date she has arranged for him with a woman named Sheila. It ends when he masturbates next to her in her car by a children's playground.

Brad skips taking the bar exam again and his suspicious wife Kathy tells him to invite Sarah, Richard, and Lucy over for dinner. The intimacy evident between Brad and Sarah confirms Kathy's suspicions so she arranges for her mother to come for an extended visit.

At Brad's football team's final game, Sarah attends and cheers as Brad scores the winning touchdown. Afterwards, they make out on the field, with Brad convincing her to run away with him although she initially suggests they end the affair.

Brad's friend Larry Hedges is a former police officer who went on disability after accidentally killing a child. He has been obsessed with watching Ronnie and spends much of his time harassing him.

One night Larry enters Ronnie's neighborhood and causes a disturbance with a megaphone. May comes outside to confront Larry, who pushes her to the ground, causing her to suffer a heart attack. Larry is arrested. May is taken to a hospital, where she dies. Ronnie returns home from the hospital and he finds a note written by May saying: "Please be a good boy." Distraught, he destroys much of his mother's collection of Hummel figurines then grabs a knife.

That same night, as Sarah and Brad had agreed to run away together, they plan to meet in the park. As he heads to the park, he is distracted by skateboarding teenagers. Attempting to try a jump himself, Brad knocks himself out. When he regains consciousness, he asks the paramedics to call his wife to meet him at the hospital.

Sarah takes Lucy to the park where she sees Ronnie stagger onto one of the swings. He tells her that his mother died. When Lucy disappears, Sarah panics and rushes to find her, forgetting about Brad. She finds Lucy staring at a street lamp, places her back into her car, and drives home.

Larry arrives to apologize to Ronnie about May's passing, but he discovers that Ronnie has castrated himself and is bleeding to death. Larry races Ronnie to the hospital, where Kathy also arrives for Brad.

== Cast ==
- Kate Winslet as Sarah Pierce
- Patrick Wilson as Brad Adamson
- Jennifer Connelly as Kathy Adamson
- Jackie Earle Haley as Ronald James "Ronnie" McGorvey
- Noah Emmerich as Larry Hedges
- Phyllis Somerville as May McGorvey
- Gregg Edelman as Richard Pierce
- Ty Simpkins as Aaron Adamson
- Sadie Goldstein as Lucy Pierce
- Jane Adams as Sheila
- Raymond J. Barry as Bob "Bullhorn Bob"
- Trini Alvarado as Theresa
- Marsha Dietlein as Cheryl
- Mary B. McCann as Mary Ann
- Rebecca Schull as Laurel
- Chadwick Brown as Tony Correnti
- Adam Mucci as Richie Murphy
- Chance Kelly as Pete Olaffson
- Lola Pashalinski as Bridget
- Hunter Reid as Christian
- Sarah Buxton as Slutty Kay
- Thomas Greaney as Troy
- Leon Vitali as Oddly Familiar Man
- Tom Perrotta as Small Man
- Will Lyman (uncredited) as The Narrator

== Production ==
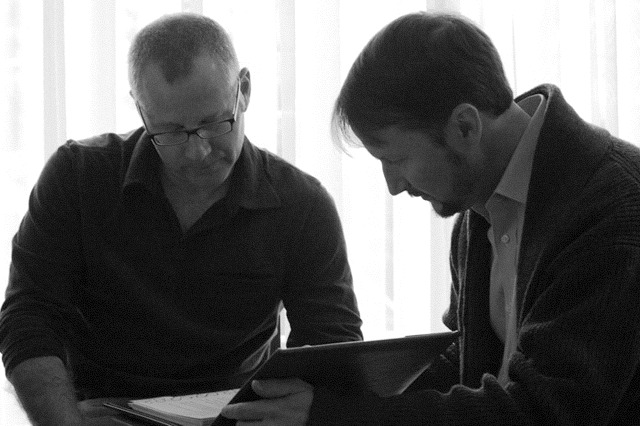
Perrotta and Field working on script

For this film, director Todd Field and novelist Tom Perrotta intended to take the story in a separate and somewhat different direction than the novel. "When Todd and I began collaborating on the script, we were hoping to make something new out of the material, rather than simply reproducing the book onto film," says Perrotta.

Kate Winslet said she was left with a bruised bottom after filming her sex scene in a sink.

== Critical reception ==
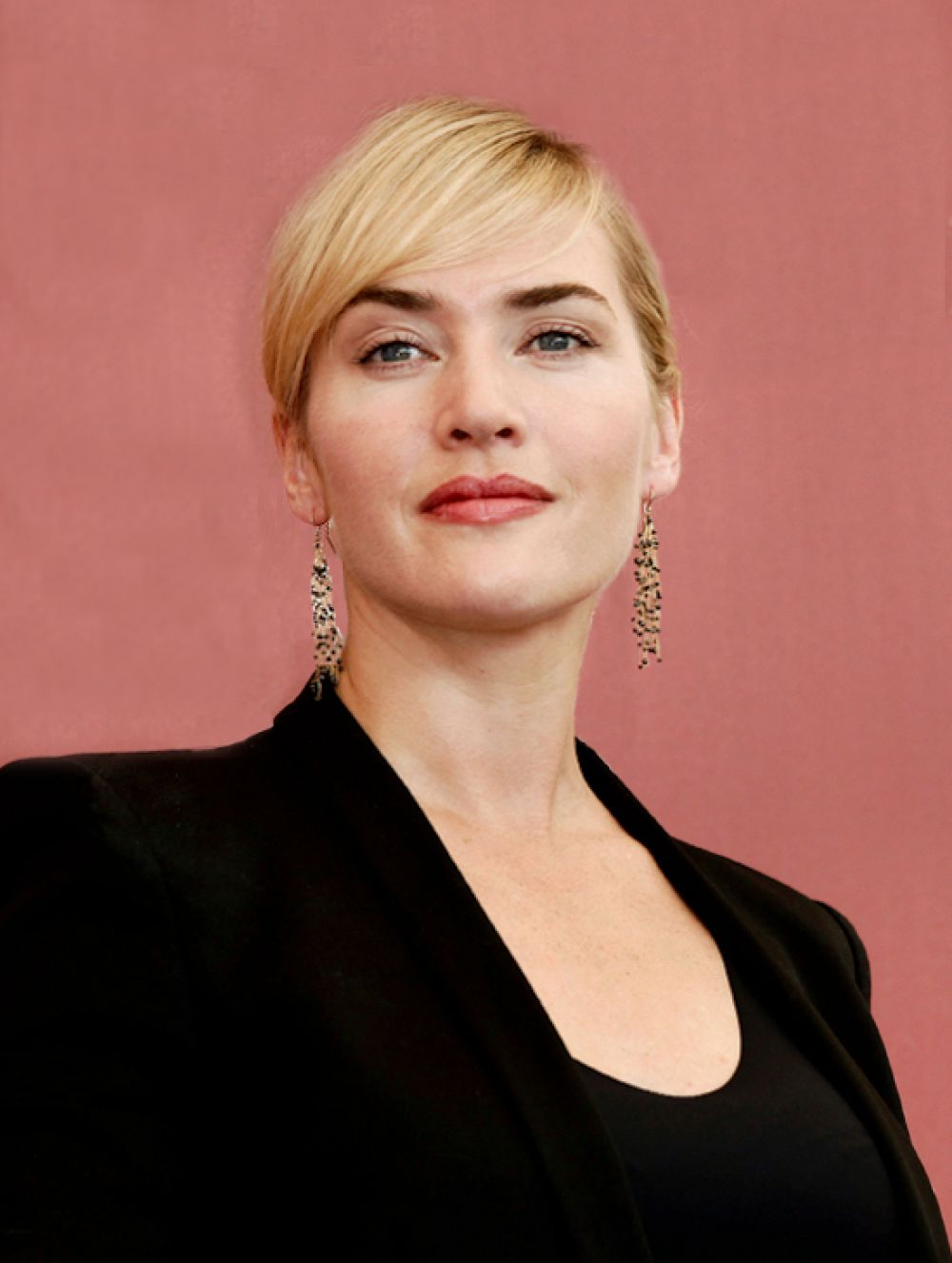
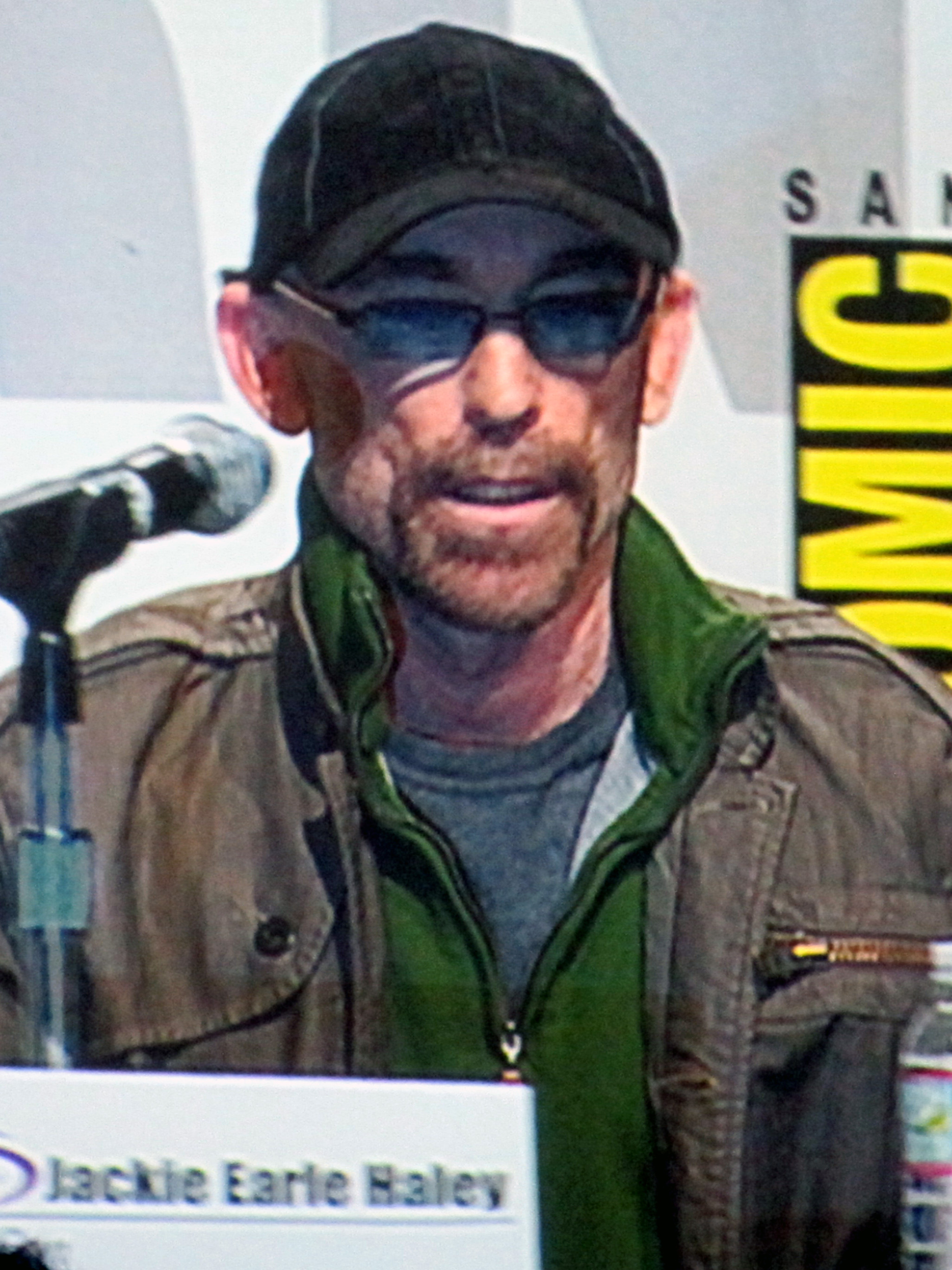
Winslet and Earle Haley received Academy Award nominations for Best Actress and Best Supporting Actor.

The film was well-received. On review aggregator Rotten Tomatoes, the film holds an 81% approval rating based on 159 reviews with an average rating of 7.7/10. The website's critical consensus states, "Little Children takes a penetrating look at suburbia and its flawed individuals with an unflinching yet humane eye.” Metacritic assigned the film a weighted average score of 75 out of 100 based on 34 critics, indicating "generally favorable reviews.”

A. O. Scott of The New York Times wrote:

Mr. Field proves to be among the most literary of American filmmakers. In too many recent movies intelligence is woefully undervalued, and it is this quality—even more than its considerable beauty—that distinguishes Little Children from its peers. A movie that is challenging, accessible, and hard to stop thinking about.

Scott later placed Little Children ninth on his list of the top 10 films of 2006.

Carina Chocano of The Los Angeles Times also praised the film:

Little Children is one of those rare films that transcends its source material. Firmly rooted in the present and in our current frame of mind—a time and frame of mind that few artists have shown interest in really exploring—the movie is one of the few films I can think of that examines the baffling combination of smugness, self-abnegation, ceremonial deference and status anxiety that characterizes middle-class Gen X parenting, and find sheer, white-knuckled terror at its core.

== Awards and honors ==
The film received multiple awards and accolades, including three Academy Award nominations: Best Actress for Kate Winslet, Best Supporting Actor for Jackie Earle Haley, and Best Adapted Screenplay for Todd Field and Tom Perrotta.

=== Top ten lists ===
Little Children was listed on many critics' top ten lists.

- 1st – Kevin Crust, Los Angeles Times
- 2nd – Mick LaSalle, San Francisco Chronicle
- 3rd – Michael Phillips, Chicago Tribune
- 3rd – Dennis Harvey, Variety
- 4th – James Berardinelli, Reelviews
- 4th – J. R. Jones, Chicago Reader
- 5th – Peter Hartlaub, San Francisco Chronicle
- 6th – Frank Scheck, The Hollywood Reporter
- 8th – Shawn Levy, Portland Oregonian
- 9th – A. O. Scott, New York Times
- 10th – William Arnold, Seattle Post-Intelligencer
- 10th – Richard Schickel, Time
- Top 10 (listed alphabetically) – Carina Chocano, Los Angeles Times
- Top 10 (listed alphabetically) – Ruthe Stein, San Francisco Chronicle
- Top 10 (listed alphabetically) – Steven Rea, Philadelphia Inquirer
- Best of 2006 (listed alphabetically, not ranked) – David Denby, The New Yorker

== Film archives ==
35mm safety prints are housed in both the UCLA Film & Television Archive and the Museum of Modern Art's permanent film collection.

== Home media ==
The film was released on DVD on May 1, 2007. The DVD does not include extra features or a director's commentary.
