= Election (novel) =

1998 novel by Tom Perrotta

- First edition cover
- Author: Tom Perrotta
- Language: English
- Genre: Black comedy
- Publisher: Putnam Adult
- Publication date: March 9, 1998
- Publication place: United States
- Media type: Print (Hardback & Paperback) & Audiobook
- Pages: 200 pp
- ISBN: 0-399-14366-1
- OCLC: 37322216
- Dewey Decimal: 813/.54 21
- LC Class: PS3566.E6948 E43 1998

Election is a 1998 novel by Tom Perrotta about a high school history teacher who attempts to sabotage a manipulative, ambitious girl's campaign to become school president. The novel was adapted into a film of the same title directed by Alexander Payne. Shooting occurred in 1997, prior to publication, but the film was not released until 1999.

== Synopsis ==
In 1992, amidst the U.S. Presidential Elections that year, students at Winwood High in suburban New Jersey are preparing to vote for their school president. Tracy Flick is unpopular with her peers, but is highly ambitious and intelligent. A year before the election, she is groomed by Mr. Dexter, her yearbook supervisor, and he sexually exploits her. After Tracy tells her mother, her mother informs the school, and consequently, his career and marriage both end. One of Tracy's current teachers, James "Jim" McAllister (known as "Mr. M." to his students), who was a friend of Mr. Dexter, learns that Tracy is taking part in the election. Feeling that Tracy needs to be taken down a notch, Mr. M prompts Paul Warren (a student of whom he approves) to run against her. In turn, Paul's outcast lesbian sister, Tammy, begins a reckless campaign to be school president in retaliation against her ex-girlfriend Lisa, who is now dating Paul. Mr. M ultimately loses his job as a teacher when it is discovered that he has sabotaged the election by pocketing Tracy's winning votes, thereby falsely making Paul the president. Mr. M ends up working at a car dealership, while Tracy goes on to attend Georgetown University.

== Reception ==
The novel was a moderate success and received critical praise. The San Francisco Chronicle called it a "darkly eerie and winning new novel", and The New York Times wrote that the novel "provides gratifyingly exact and telling portraits of the kids themselves. Solid plotting guarantees that the reader really does want to learn who wins when the ballots are finally counted."

== Sequel ==
A sequel, Tracy Flick Can't Win, was published on June 7, 2022.
