= Little Children (novel) =

Book by Tom Perrotta

- First edition cover
- Author: Tom Perrotta
- Language: English
- Genre: Novel
- Publisher: St. Martin's Press
- Publication date: March 1, 2004
- Publication place: United States
- Media type: Print (hardback & paperback)
- Pages: 368 pp
- ISBN: 0-312-31571-6
- OCLC: 52721112
- Dewey Decimal: 813/.54 22
- LC Class: PS3566.E6948 L57 2004

Little Children is a 2004 novel by American author Tom Perrotta that interweaves the dark stories of seven main characters, all of whom live in the same Boston suburb during the middle of a hot summer.

The novel received critical praise, spurring The New York Times to declare Perrotta "an American Chekhov whose characters even at their most ridiculous seem blessed and ennobled by a luminous human aura." The novel was featured on numerous "Best Books of 2004" lists, including The New York Times Book Review, Newsweek, National Public Radio, and People magazine. In 2006, the novel was adapted into an Academy Award-nominated film of the same name starring Kate Winslet, Jennifer Connelly, and Patrick Wilson.

== Plot summary ==
Sarah, who once considered herself a feminist, wonders how she allowed herself to be reduced to a stay-at-home mother, constantly at the playground with three other Stepford-esque mothers whom she can't stand. Her husband, Richard, is much older than she is, and a sort of last resort for couplehood; it is even hinted that she married him only because she feared that she would be stuck in her dead-end job as a Starbucks barista forever if she didn't. When she discovers his addiction to online pornography, she is more apathetic than repulsed. Richard stumbled upon a porn website for an extremely sexual woman who calls herself Slutty Kay. He becomes obsessed with this woman and eventually orders a pair of used underwear from her to stop this addiction. She also hosts "fan club" meetings in California to meet and perform sexual acts with her fans.

Todd is a handsome young father whom the neighborhood women have nicknamed the "Prom King." Todd’s marriage to his gorgeous wife Kathy, a documentary filmmaker, is floundering. She is the breadwinner of the house and Todd is a stay-at-home father. But she resents this fact and repeatedly pressures Todd to take the bar exam, which he despises and has already failed twice before. Todd never really wanted to be a lawyer so he spends his "studying" time reliving his youth by watching a group of teenage skateboarders. Todd takes care of his son during the summer days, but feels frustrated and insulted by how his son wears a jester's cap every day while with his father, but takes it off as soon as his Kathy gets home. Todd interprets this as his son thinking of their time together as meaningless and a joke.

One day, while Todd watches the skateboarders, an old friend of his, a retired cop named Larry, drives by in his van and takes Todd to a midnight touch football league that he plays in. Larry was forced off of the force after an incident of an active shooter in a mall that he shot who turned out to be a teenager with a toy gun. He tries to convince Todd to join due to the fact that Todd was a football player in high school. Despite other teams members all being cops, Todd still decides to join because of a certain sense of life and energy that he feels while playing. Their team is not known as a particularly good team and actually loses most of their games. Afterwards, Larry and Todd drive over to Ronald McGorvey's house. Ronald is a recently moved in sex offender who exposed himself to a Girl Scout and many believe to have killed another little girl. Ronald is depressed and has practically given up on life, but lives with his mother May, who tries her best to cheer him up and take care of him. Larry goes over to Ronald's house every day to torment and insult him, usually bringing Todd along.

While the group of mothers are talking with Sarah, Todd arrives and one of the other mothers dares Sarah to get his phone number. While jokingly discussing the bet, Todd and Sarah engage in a kiss that becomes more passionate than the ruse called for. In the weeks following, Todd and Sarah don't see each other for quite a while, but the kiss is the main thing occupying their thoughts. Sarah thinks up a plan to go over to the town pool, which Todd had said he went to most days, and try to seduce him. She orders multiple pairs of bikinis off of the Internet to try on, but is self-conscious about her body and believes she looks horrible in all of them. She ultimately decides to wear a red bikini to the pool. She finds him there and sits her towel next to Todd's. They have a good time talking to each other and their kids form a sort of friendship, so they make a habit of it and meet at the pool every day. On a particularly hot day at the pool, Ronald takes a swim. His presence distresses everyone, eventually driving them out of the pool. He is then escorted by cops out of the pool before yelling, "I was just trying to cool off!". An electrical storm then starts and everyone starts to rush home. Sarah and Todd both go over to her house and have sex for the first time while their kids are sleeping. This becomes a regular thing.

Ronald, for his part, finds himself ostracized by the community. May forces Ronald to go on a date with a woman with mental problems, and the date is ruined when he gives in to temptation and masturbates while watching children. During one visit to Ronald's house, Larry eventually gets into a shoving match with Ronald's mother, May, who has a fatal stroke. Bertha, a school crossing guard and May's best friend, takes Ronnie to the hospital, where May has written him a note that reads only "Please, please be a good boy." Larry goes over to apologize to Ronald, but sees the place trashed and Ronald gone. He then finds the note from May, in which Ronald has responded that he doesn't think that he can.

Todd and Sarah make a plan to take a trip to a beach while Todd is supposed to be taking his bar exam. After this, Todd's son tells Kathy about Sarah and her daughter which leads Kathy to suspect an affair between the two, due to Todd never telling her about Sarah. She then convinces him to invite Sarah and her daughter over to dinner. Everything seems to be going well until Sarah uses the word "we" quite naturally while referring to her and Todd, which makes it clear to Kathy that they are indeed having an affair. She then gets her mother to follow the two around to make sure Todd isn't doing anything.

Richard decides to go to Slutty Kay's fan club meeting in San Diego. A man picks him up to take him to it and reveals that her name is actually Carla. The meeting is nowhere near as sexual as he thought, but ends up forming a more personal and human connection with Carla and the other fans. After Sarah watches Todd win a game for his neighborhood football team, they both plan to leave their spouses. As Sarah prepares to leave with her daughter Lucy, Richard calls her from San Diego and says that he is leaving her for Slutty Kay. Todd, meanwhile, injures himself while attempting a skateboarding trick in front of the teenage skaters, and realizes that he doesn't see a future with Sarah.

Sarah takes Lucy to the local playground late at night while waiting for Todd, but Todd never shows up. Just when she starts to lose hope, Ronald appears, crying over his mother's death. Much to her own surprise, she feels sympathy for him, until he admits that he has given in to his compulsions and killed a girl. Larry suddenly approaches, ready to kill Ronald, but finds it in his heart to offer his condolences on May's death. Sarah just sits, baffled, wondering how she will raise her daughter, whom she feels she has greatly let down. They all stand there as Sarah realizes that she was foolish and delusional to ever think that her affair with Todd would work out.

== Reception ==
Writing for The New York Times, Will Blythe praised the novel, noting that Little Children "raises the question of how a writer can be so entertainingly vicious and yet so full of fellow feeling. Bracingly tender moments stud Perrotta's satire". Kirkus Reviews described Little Children as "Perrotta's best" novel and further remarked that, "the juxtapositions whereby Perrotta charts his several characters’ interconnected misadventures are handled with masterly authority."
