= Medical geology =

Field crossing geology and medicine

Medical geology is an interdisciplinary scientific field studying the relationship between natural geological factors and their effects on human and animal health. The Commission on Geological Sciences for Environmental Planning defines medical geology as "the science dealing with the influence of ordinary environmental factors on the geographical distribution of health problems in man and animals."

In its broadest sense, medical geology studies exposure to or deficiency of trace elements and minerals; inhalation of ambient and anthropogenic mineral dusts and volcanic emissions; transportation, modification and concentration of organic compounds; and exposure to radionuclides, microbes and pathogens.

== History ==
Many have deemed medical geology as a new field, when in actuality it is re-emerging. Hippocrates and Aristotle first recognized the relationship between human diseases and the earth's elements. This field ultimately depends on a number of different fields coming and working together to solve some of the earth's mysteries. The scientific term for this field is hydrobiogeochemoepidemiopathoecology; however, it is more commonly known as medical geology. It was established in 1990 by the International Union of Geological Sciences. Paracelsus, the "father of pharmacology" (1493–1541), stated that "all substances are poisons, there is none which is not a poison. The right dosage differentiates a poison and a remedy." This passage sums up the idea of medical geology. The goal of this field is to find the right balance and intake of elements/minerals in order to improve and maintain health.

Examples of research in medical geology include:

- Studies on the impact of contaminant mobility as a result of extreme weather events such as flooding.
- Lead and other heavy metal exposure resulting from dust and other particulates
- Asbestos exposure such as amphibole asbestos dusts in Libby, Montana
- Fungal infection resulting from airborne dust, such as Valley Fever or coccidioidomycosis

Recently, a new concept of "geomedical engineering" has been introduced in medical geology through a paper titled "Geomedical Engineering: A new and captivating prospect". It provides the fundamentals of engineering applications to the medical geology issues.

== Environment and human health ==
It is widely known that the state of our environment affects us in many ways. Minerals and rocks have an impact on human and animal populations because that is what the earth is composed of. Medical geology brings professionals from both the medicine field and the geology field to help us understand this relationship. There are two priorities that have been established within the medical geology field, "(1) the study of trace elements, especially their bioavailability and (2) a need to establish baseline, or background levels of contaminants/xenobiotics/potentially harmful but naturally occurring materials in water, soil, air, food, and animal tissue." The elements and minerals in the land affect people and animals immensely, especially when there is a close relationship between the two. Those who depend heavily on the land are faced with one of two problems. First, those who live in places such as Maputaland, South Africa are exposed to heavily impoverished soils which result in a number of diseases caused by mineral imbalances. Secondly, those in areas such as India and Bangladesh are often exposed to an excess of elements in the land, resulting in mineral toxicity.

All living organisms need some naturally occurring elements; however, excessive amounts can be detrimental to health. There is a direct link between health and the earth because all humans ingest and breath in these chemicals and for the most part it is done unknowingly.

=== Sources of chemical exposure ===
There are many ways in which humans come into contact with the earth's elements and below are only a few ways in which we become exposed to them.

- Volcanoes are one of the main sources that bring all the toxicity from inside the earth to the outside. They bring out chemicals such as; arsenic, beryllium, cadmium, mercury, lead, radon, and uranium.
- Rocks are also one of the leading sources in exposure to these elements. "They are essentially the source of all the naturally occurring chemical elements found on the earth."

== Diseases ==
=== Iodine deficiency ===
One of the biggest geochemical diseases is iodine deficiency. Thirty percent of the world is at risk for it and insufficient intake is the most common cause of intellectual disability and brain damage. The sea is a major source of iodine and those who are further from it are at a disadvantage. Another source of it is in soil; however, goitrogens such as humus and clay trap the iodine, making it hard for people to access it. Some cultures actually consume the earth's minerals by eating soil and clay; this is known as geophagy. It is most common in the tropics, especially among pregnant women. The Ottomac people of South America engage in this practice and none have suffered from any health problems related with mineral/ Iodine deficiency.

=== Cardiovascular disease ===
Cardiovascular disease has often been linked to water hardness as the main cause. Water hardness means that there is magnesium in the water with calcium playing a role. Some research has completely discredited this evidence, and has found that the more magnesium in the water the less chance of death cardiovascular disease.

=== Radiation ===
Natural radiation is found everywhere; it is in the air, water, soil, rocks, minerals and food. The largest amount of radiation comes from radon. Certain places are called 'high background radiation areas' (HBRAs), such as Guarapari, Southwest of France, Ramsar, parts of China, and Kerala Coast. People living in these areas however have not shown any health deficiencies and in some cases are even healthier and live longer than those not in HBRAs.

=== Other issues ===
Among the problems presented there are also issues with fluoride in Africa and India, arsenic in Argentina, Chile, and Taiwan, selenium in areas of the United States, Venezuela, China and nitrate in agricultural areas. As medical geology grows it may become more important to the medical field in relation to the issue of diseases. In addition to deficiencies of particular minerals, dietary excesses of certain elements occurring in specific geographic regions can also be harmful to human health, as per the examples listed below:

- Hyperkalemia: excess amount of potassium
- Hypercalcemia: excess amount of calcium
- Hyperphosphatemia: excess amount of phosphorus

== International Medical Geology Association ==
"The International Medical Geology Association (IMGA) aims to provide a network and a forum to bring together the combined expertise of geologists and earth scientists, environmental scientists, toxicologists, epidemiologists, and medical specialists, in order to characterize the properties of geological processes and agents, the dispersal of geological material and their effects on human population." IMGA was founded in 2006 and manages affairs and funds, plans conferences, elections and publications, and they are also a way of encouraging growth and recognition in the field. Although it was founded in 2006, it was a work in progress for ten years when a working group of medical geology was established by the International Union of Geological Sciences (IUGS) in 1996. The goal of the working group was to advertise and make people aware of the harmful effects the environment has on our health.
