= Tom Perrotta =

American novelist

- Perrotta in 2026
- Born: August 13, 1961 (age 65); Newark, New Jersey, U.S.
- Education: Yale University (BA); Syracuse University (MA)
- Occupations: Novelist; screenwriter
- Spouse: Mary Granfield (m. 1991)
- Children: 2
- Writing career
- Period: 1988–present
- Website: tomperrotta.net

Thomas R. Perrotta (born August 13, 1961) is an American novelist and screenwriter best known for his novels Election (1998) and Little Children (2004), both of which were made into Academy Award-nominated films. Perrotta co-wrote the screenplay for the 2006 film version of Little Children with Todd Field, for which he received an Academy Award nomination for Best Adapted Screenplay. He is also known for his novel The Leftovers (2011), which was adapted into the critically acclaimed TV series on HBO, co-created by Perrotta and Damon Lindelof.

== Biography ==
Tom Perrotta was born in Newark, New Jersey, where he spent his entire childhood, and was raised Roman Catholic. His father was an Italian immigrant postal worker, whose parents emigrated from a village near Avellino, Campania, and his mother is an Albanian-Italian immigrant former secretary, who stayed home to raise him along with his older brother and younger sister. Perrotta enjoyed reading authors such as O. Henry, J. R. R. Tolkien, and John Irving, and decided early in his life that he wanted to be a writer. He graduated from David Brearley High School in 1979, where he was involved in the school's literary magazine, Pariah, for which he wrote several short stories. Perrotta earned a B.A. in English from Yale University in 1983, and then received an M.A. in English/creative writing from Syracuse University. While at Syracuse, Perrotta was a pupil of Tobias Wolff, whom Perrotta later praised for his "comic writing and moral seriousness".

Perrotta married writer Mary Granfield in 1991, and they have two children. As of 2019, the couple lives in Belmont, Massachusetts, a suburb of Boston.

== Career ==
While teaching creative writing at Yale, Perrotta completed three novels that he had trouble getting published. One was Election, the story of an intense high-school election inspired by the three-candidate 1992 United States presidential race, and another was Lucky Winners, which remains unpublished as of 2022 and which Perrotta described in 2004 as "a pretty good novel about a family that falls apart after winning the lottery." In 1994, Perrotta published his first book, a collection of short stories titled Bad Haircut: Stories of the Seventies which The Washington Post called "more powerful than any other coming-of-age novel". The same year, Perrotta left Yale and began teaching expository writing at Harvard University. In 1997 he published The Wishbones, his first novel, which Perrotta has said is basically "about my high school years". The unpublished manuscript of Election was optioned as a screenplay in 1996 by director Alexander Payne, which then led to interest in publishing it as a book. It arrived in bookstores in March 1998, followed shortly by its film adaptation, which was released in April 1999 to critical acclaim. The film, which starred Matthew Broderick and Reese Witherspoon, helped popularize Perrotta as an author.

Following Election, Perrotta shifted his focus to an older—though just as troubled—cast of characters: first with 2000's Joe College, a comic journey into the dark side of higher education, love, and food service (which the author says is about his college years); and then with 2004's Little Children, which explored the psychological and romantic depths beneath the surface of suburbia.

Little Children was Perrotta's "breakout book", featured on numerous "Best Books of 2004" lists—including those of The New York Times Book Review, Newsweek, National Public Radio, and People magazine—and garnering tremendous praise for Perrotta. The New York Times dubbed him "an American Chekhov whose characters even at their most ridiculous seem blessed and ennobled by a luminous human aura", and People called him "the rare writer equally gifted at drawing people's emotional maps...and creating sidesplitting scenes". For his part, Perrotta describes himself as a writer in the "plain-language American tradition" of authors such as Ernest Hemingway and Raymond Carver.

In 2006, Perrotta sold New Line Cinema an original screenplay he co-wrote with Frasier producer Rob Greenberg. Titled Barry and Stan Gone Wild, the screenplay is "a shameless comedy [about] a 40-something dermatologist who goes on spring break". In January 2007, Perrotta was on the guest faculty for the third annual Writers in Paradise conference at Eckerd College in St. Petersburg, Florida. Perrotta was invited to teach at Eckerd by Dennis Lehane; the two writers had previously taught together at Stonecoast Writers Conference in Maine.

Perrotta's novel The Abstinence Teacher was published on October 16, 2007. It is, according to the author, "all about sex education and the culture wars. It's close in spirit to Little Children, I think." It was chosen by The New York Times as a 2007 Notable Book of the Year. As of October 2007, he was working on a film adaptation of the book with Jonathan Dayton and Valerie Faris, who directed Little Miss Sunshine.

In 2010, 30,000 copies of his short story "The Smile on Happy Chang's Face" were distributed as part of the Boston Book Festival's "One City, One Story" project.

Perrotta and Damon Lindeloff adapted Perrotta's novel The Leftovers into an HBO TV series of the same name that began running in 2014 to critical acclaim for three seasons. He later adapted his 2017 novel Mrs. Fletcher into a limited series, also for HBO.

== Bibliography ==
=== Novels ===
- Fear Street #24: The Thrill Club (1994)
- The Wishbones (1997)
- Election (1998)
- Joe College (2000)
- Little Children (2004)
- The Abstinence Teacher (2007)
- The Leftovers (2011)
- Mrs. Fletcher (2017)
- Tracy Flick Can't Win (2022)
- Ghost Town (2026)

=== Short stories ===
- "The Weiner Man" (1988)
- "Wild Kingdom" (1988)
- "Forgiveness" (1989–1994)
- "The Smile on Happy Chang's Face" (2004)
- "Kiddie Pool" (2006)
- "Me and Carlos" (2020)

=== Short story collections ===
- Bad Haircut: Stories of the Seventies (1994)
- Nine Inches (2013)

=== Essays ===
- Perrotta, Tom (October 7, 2007). "The Squeamish American". The New York Times.
