= Todd Beamer =

Passenger on United Airlines Flight 93 (1968–2001)

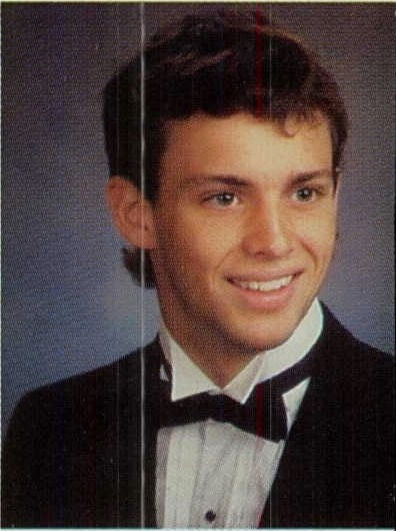
- Beamer's senior portrait c. 1986–1987
- Born: Todd Morgan Beamer; November 24, 1968; Flint, Michigan, U.S.
- Died: September 11, 2001 (aged 32); Stonycreek Township, Pennsylvania, U.S.
- Cause of death: Plane crash during the September 11 attacks
- Education: California State University, Fresno; Wheaton College
- Occupations: Account manager, Oracle Corporation
- Known for: Heroism as a passenger aboard United Airlines Flight 93
- Spouse: Lisa Brosious (m. 1994)
- Children: 3

Todd Morgan Beamer (November 24, 1968 – September 11, 2001) was an American passenger aboard United Airlines Flight 93, which was hijacked and crashed as part of the September 11 attacks in 2001. He, along with Mark Bingham, Tom Burnett, Jeremy Glick, and several other passengers and crew including CeeCee Lyles attempted to regain control of the aircraft from the hijackers. During the struggle, the hijackers crashed the Boeing 757 into a field in Stonycreek Township near Shanksville, Pennsylvania, killing everyone on board, but preventing them from reaching their intended target, presumably the U.S. Capitol or the White House.

== Biography ==
Todd Morgan Beamer was born on November 24, 1968, in Flint, Michigan, to David Beamer, an IBM sales representative, and Peggy Jackson Beamer, a muralist. He was the middle child of three and the only son. Beamer and his sisters, Melissa and Michele, were raised "with a strong biblical value system and work ethic". The family relocated to Poughkeepsie, New York, and later to Wheaton, Illinois, a suburb west of Chicago, where David worked at Amdahl, a computer technology company.

Beamer attended Wheaton Christian Grammar School, where he played soccer, basketball, and baseball. He attended Wheaton Academy, a Christian high school, from 1983 to 1985, and excelled in the same sports. He was elected class vice president in his junior year. After David was promoted to vice president of Amdahl's California headquarters, the family moved, and Beamer spent his senior year at Los Gatos High School, in Los Gatos southwest of San Jose.

Beamer attended California State University, Fresno, where he majored in physical therapy and played baseball, hoping to play professionally. Injuries from an automobile accident ended these plans. He returned to Illinois and transferred to Wheaton College, a Christian liberal arts college. At Wheaton College he majored initially in medicine before switching to business. He continued to play baseball and, as a senior, became captain of the basketball team. He graduated in 1991.

While at Wheaton College, he met Lisa Brosious, his future wife, during a senior seminar class. Their first date was November 2, 1991, the 10-year anniversary of which they had been planning to celebrate at the time of his death.

Beamer worked for Wilson Sporting Goods while taking night classes at DePaul University, earning an M.B.A. in June 1993.

Beamer married Brosious on May 14, 1994, in Peekskill, New York, and they moved to Plainsboro, New Jersey, where Beamer began working with Oracle Corporation, selling systems applications and database software as a field marketing representative. Within months, he was promoted to account manager. He held that position until his death. They had two sons, and their daughter was born in January 2002.

Beamer and his wife taught Sunday school at Princeton Alliance Church for six years and worked in youth ministry. Beamer also played on the church softball team. He was a staunch fan of the Chicago Cubs, Chicago Bulls, and Chicago Bears. In 2000, the Beamers moved to Cranbury, New Jersey.

=== Flight 93 ===
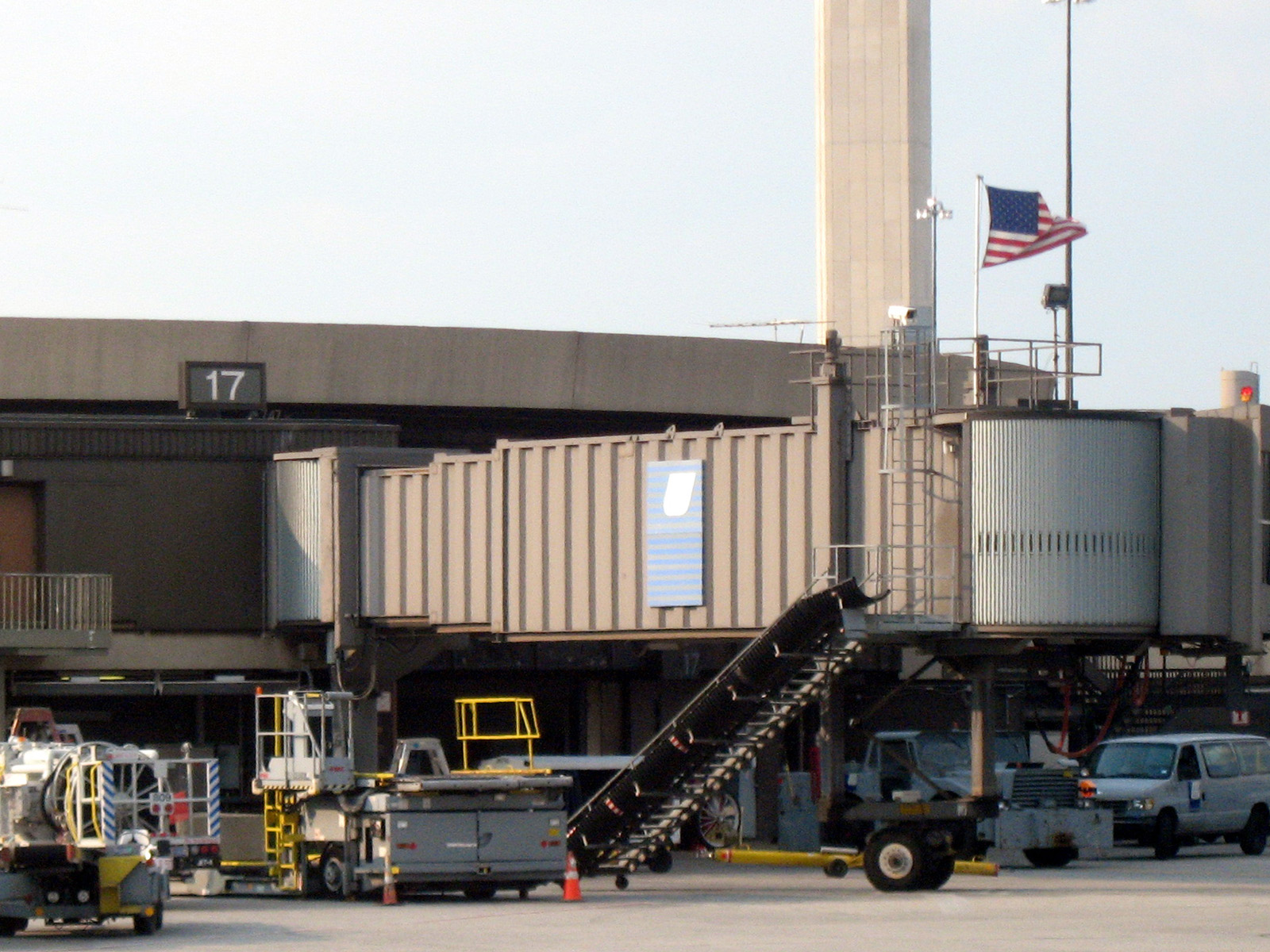
An American flag now flies over Gate 17 of Terminal A at Newark Liberty International Airport, departure gate of United 93.

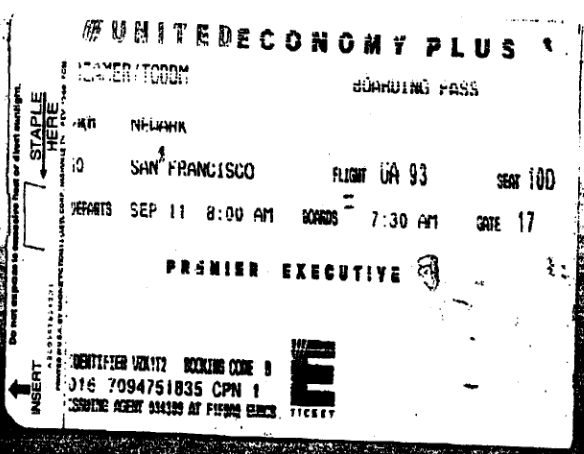
Todd Beamer's boarding pass for Flight 93

Beamer's work required him to travel up to four times a month, sometimes for as long as a week. In 2001, he earned a five-day trip to Italy with his wife for being a top sales performer. They returned home on Monday, September 10, at 5:00 pm EDT. Although Beamer could have left that night for a Tuesday business meeting in California, he chose instead to spend time with his pregnant wife, who was due with their third child the following January. He left home at 6:15 the next morning to take an early flight from Newark to San Francisco to meet with representatives of the Sony Corporation at 1:00 pm, planning to return on a red-eye flight that night.

Flight 93 was scheduled to depart at 8:00 am, but the Boeing 757 did not leave until 42 minutes later because of runway traffic delays. Four minutes later, American Airlines Flight 11 crashed into the World Trade Center's North Tower. At 9:03 am, 17 minutes later, as United Airlines Flight 175 struck the South Tower, Flight 93 was climbing to cruising altitude, heading west over New Jersey and into Pennsylvania. At 9:25 am, while above eastern Ohio, its pilot radioed Cleveland controllers to ask about an alert that had appeared on his cockpit screen to "beware of cockpit intrusion." Three minutes later, Cleveland controllers heard screams over the cockpit's open microphone. Moments after that, the hijackers, led by Lebanese national Ziad Jarrah, took control of the plane, disengaged the autopilot, and told passengers, "Keep remaining sitting [sic]. We have a bomb on board." Beamer and the other passengers were moved to the back of the plane. Within six minutes, the aircraft changed course and headed for Washington, D.C.

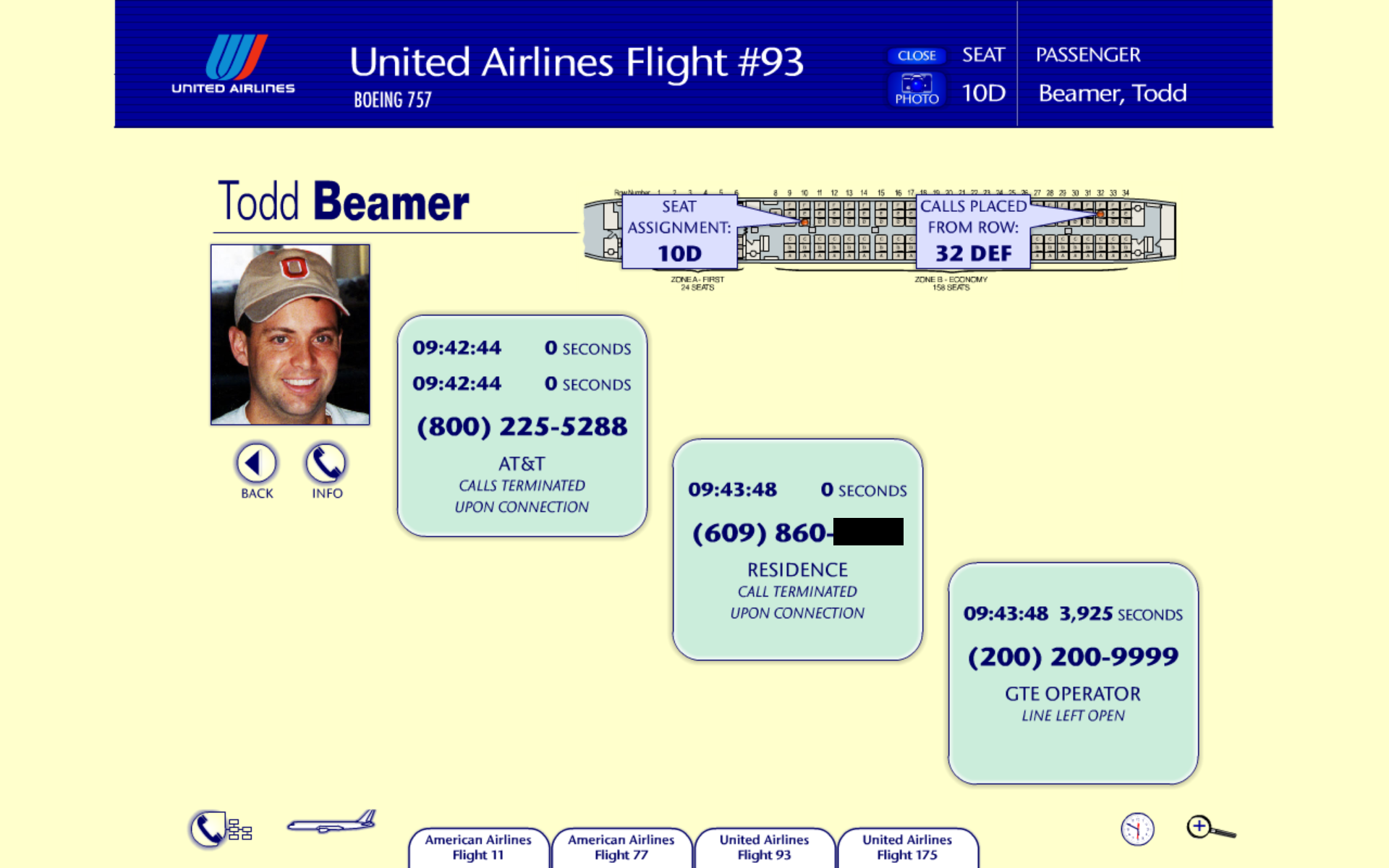
Phone call details

Several passengers made phone calls to loved ones, who told them about the two planes that had crashed into the World Trade Center in New York City and the third into the Pentagon in Arlington County, Virginia. Beamer tried to place a credit-card call through a phone on the back of a plane seat, but was routed to a customer-service representative, who transferred him to GTE Airfone supervisor Lisa Jefferson. With FBI agents listening to the call, Beamer told Jefferson that hijackers had taken over Flight 93 and that one passenger had been killed. He said two of the hijackers had knives and that one appeared to have a bomb strapped around his waist. When the hijackers veered the plane sharply south, Beamer exclaimed, "We're going down! We're going down!"

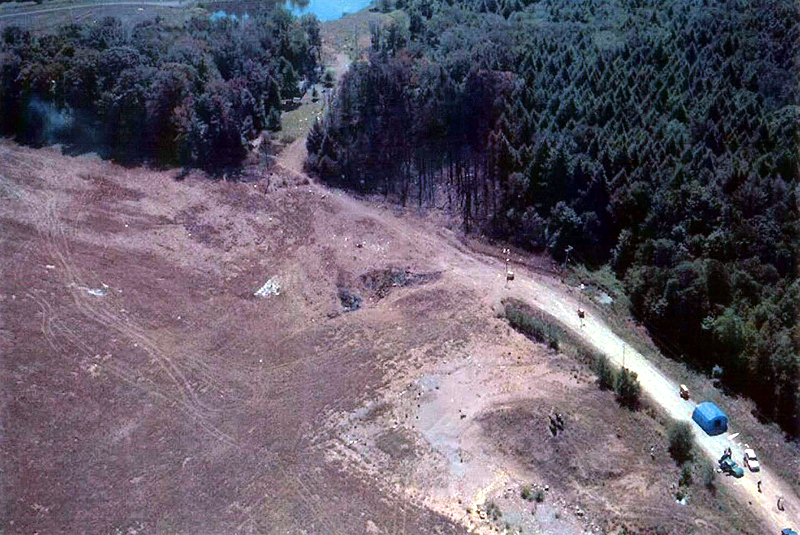
Flight 93 crash site

After this, the passengers and flight crew decided to act. According to accounts of cell-phone conversations, Beamer, Mark Bingham, Tom Burnett, and Jeremy Glick formed a plan to retake the plane. They were joined by other passengers, including Lou Nacke, Rich Guadagno, Alan Beaven, Honor Elizabeth Wainio, Linda Gronlund, and William Cashman, along with flight attendants Sandra Bradshaw and CeeCee Lyles, in discussing their options and voting on a course of action, ultimately deciding to storm the cockpit. Beamer told Jefferson that the group planned to "jump on" the hijackers and crash the plane before the hijackers could carry out their plan. He recited the Lord's Prayer and the 23rd Psalm with Jefferson, prompting others to join in. He asked Jefferson, "If I don't make it, please call my family and let them know how much I love them." After this, Jefferson heard muffled voices and Beamer clearly answering, "Are you ready? Okay. Let's roll." These were the last words from Beamer that Jefferson heard.

According to the 9/11 Commission Report, the cockpit voice recorder revealed pounding and crashing against the cockpit door and shouts and screams in English. "Let's get them!" a passenger cried. A hijacker shouted, "Allāhu ʾAkbar". Jarrah repeatedly pitched the plane to throw passengers off their feet, but they continued their assault. At 10:02:17, a male passenger said, "Turn it up!" A second later, a hijacker said, "Pull it down! Pull it down!" At 10:02:33, Jarrah was heard pleading, "Hey! Hey! Give it to me. Give it to me. Give it to me. Give it to me. Give it to me. Give it to me. Give it to me. Give it to me." The plane crashed upside down into an empty field in Shanksville, Pennsylvania, at 563 miles per hour (906 km/h), killing everyone on board. It was 20 minutes of flying time from its suspected target, either the White House or the U.S. Capitol in Washington, D.C. According to Vice President Dick Cheney, President George W. Bush had given an order to shoot the plane down if it continued toward Washington.

== Legacy ==
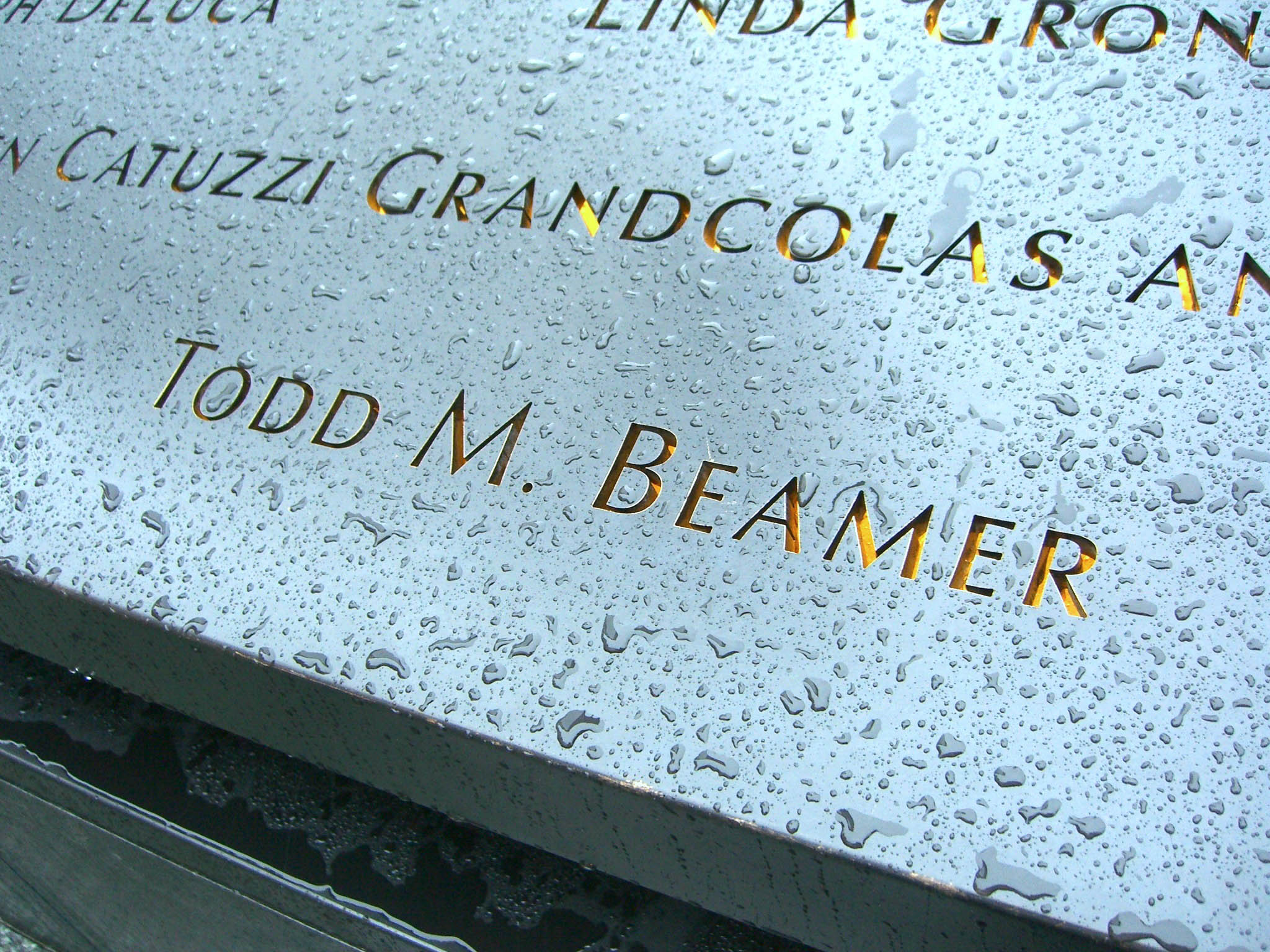
Beamer's name is located on Panel S-68 of the National September 11 Memorial's South Pool, along with those of other passengers of Flight 93.

In an address to a joint session of Congress and the American people on September 20, 2001, which Beamer's wife attended, President Bush praised the courage of United 93's passengers, naming Beamer in particular and calling him "an exceptional man." In a November 8 address from the World Congress Center in Atlanta, Georgia, Bush invoked Beamer's last-heard words, saying, "Some of our greatest moments have been acts of courage for which no one could have been prepared. But we have our marching orders. My fellow Americans, let's roll!" He used the phrase again in the 2002 State of the Union address: "For too long our culture has said, 'If it feels good, do it.' Now America is embracing a new ethic and a new creed: 'Let's roll.'"

A nonprofit foundation was established in October 2001 to counsel traumatized children of 9/11 victims and survivors. Beamer's best friend, Doug Macmillan, left his job to become the administrator of the Foundation.

"Let's Roll" was adopted by the Pentagon Renovation Program as the slogan for the Phoenix Project, the reconstruction of the portion damaged by American Airlines Flight 77. The sentence was also prominently displayed on the construction site alongside a timer counting down to the first anniversary of the attacks.

In 2002, Beamer's widow, Lisa, wrote a book with coauthor Ken Abraham, Let's Roll! Ordinary People, Extraordinary Courage.

In 2002, the passengers of Flight 93, including Beamer, were posthumously awarded the Arthur Ashe Courage Award.

The Cranbury, New Jersey, post office was dedicated to Beamer on May 4, 2002, following an Act of Congress authored by Congressman Rush D. Holt, Jr. The bill was signed into law by President George W. Bush.

In 2003, Wheaton College honored Beamer, an alumnus, by opening the Todd M. Beamer Center, which includes Anderson Commons, Coray Alumni Gym, and the Student Center located on the lower level. That same year, Todd Beamer High School opened in Federal Way, Washington.

In February 2010, the city of Fresno, California, dedicated Todd Beamer Park.

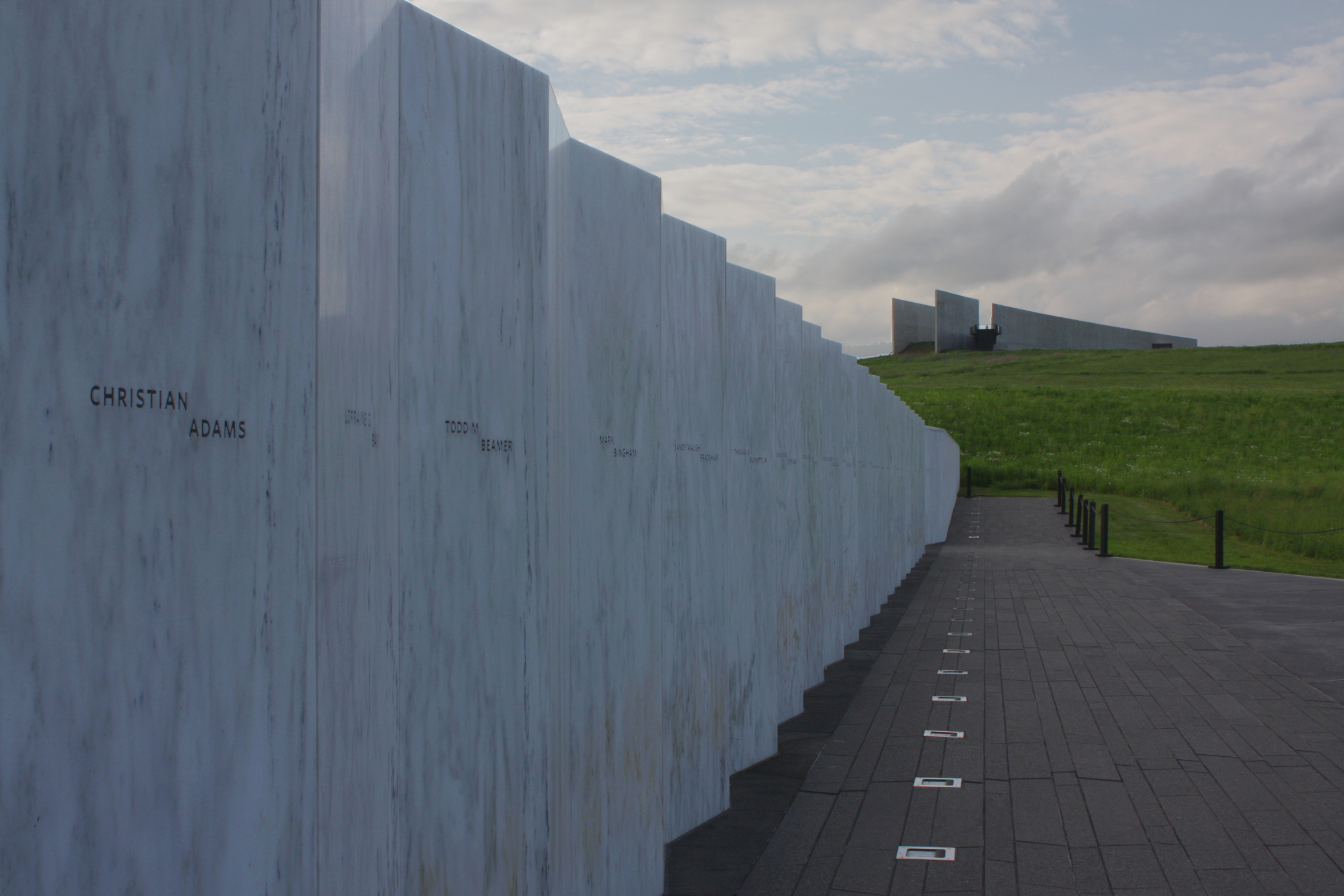
Beamer's name appears on the third panel at the Flight 93 National Memorial, seen here with the visitor center in the background.

The Flight 93 National Memorial located at the crash site in Stonycreek Township includes a concrete and glass visitor center and a white marble Wall of Names, completed in 2011, on which Beamer's name and those of his 32 fellow passengers and seven crewmembers are engraved on individual panels.

At the National 9/11 Memorial, Beamer and the other passengers and crew of Flight 93 are memorialized at the South Pool, on Panel S-68. An Oracle business card bearing Beamer's name and his two-tone Rolex Oyster Perpetual Datejust "Turn-o-Graph" wristwatch, both recovered damaged at the crash site, are displayed inside the memorial museum.

On September 10, 2013, Wheaton Academy honored Beamer by unveiling a plaque dedicated to him on the school grounds, next to a plaque for a former student killed in Afghanistan.

To mark the 20th anniversary of the September 11 attacks, fellow DePaul University alumnus Nicholas Hahn III created the Todd M. Beamer Memorial Scholarship to educate and inspire DePaul students about Beamer's example.

== In popular culture ==
- He has been portrayed by Bryan Friday in the 2005 television film The Flight That Fought Back, David Alan Basche in United 93, and Brennan Elliott in Flight 93.
- Beamer is featured in two panels within The Amazing Spider-Man (Volume 2) issue #36 (December 2001), in which he ends his phone call with Lisa Jefferson before storming the cockpit. In the book, which is written by J. Michael Straczynski and drawn by John Romita, Jr., Spider-Man refers to the passengers of Flight 93 as "Ordinary men. Ordinary women. Refusing to surrender."
- The Neil Young song "Let's Roll", written in the aftermath of the attacks, is a tribute to Beamer sung from his perspective.
