= Lisa Beamer =

American writer (born 1969)

- Born: Lisa Brosious; April 10, 1969 (age 57); Albany, New York, US
- Occupations: Writer, activist
- Notable work: Let's Roll!: Ordinary People, Extraordinary Courage
- Spouse: Todd Beamer (m. 1994; died 2001)
- Children: 3

Lisa Beamer (née Brosious; born April 10, 1969) is an American writer. The widow of Todd Beamer, a victim of the United Airlines Flight 93 crash as part of the September 11 attacks against the United States in 2001, she has become best known for her actions following the disaster.

Beamer is a 1991 graduate of Wheaton College; she gave the 2011 commencement address at Wheaton and was a cheerleader.

== Post-9/11 career ==
At the time of the attacks, Beamer was five months pregnant with her daughter, Morgan Kay, who was born on January 9, 2002. In the immediate aftermath of the attacks, the pregnant Beamer had a high profile, with more than 200 media appearances in six months. She was introduced by President George W. Bush at a commemoration ceremony. Shortly after the attacks, she set up the Todd M. Beamer Memorial Foundation, which was initially run by a family friend. The organization sought to trademark the phrase "Let's Roll," which was the subject of some criticism after some accused her of seeking to profit from her husband's death.

In 2003, Beamer and co-author Ken Abraham wrote a book about Todd and her attempts to deal with her grief over his death, Let's Roll!: Ordinary People, Extraordinary Courage, about Todd and Beamer's life before the crash and her life since. Royalties from the book were donated to the Todd M. Beamer Foundation, which was founded in 2001 by Beamer and others to help children who have suffered trauma. The organization was later renamed Heroic Choices. As of 2007, Heroic Choices was struggling to maintain financial viability. According to the board chair, "[as with any charity created after 9/11], the farther you get away from the event, the more difficult it is to raise funds."
