= Let's roll =

English colloquialism

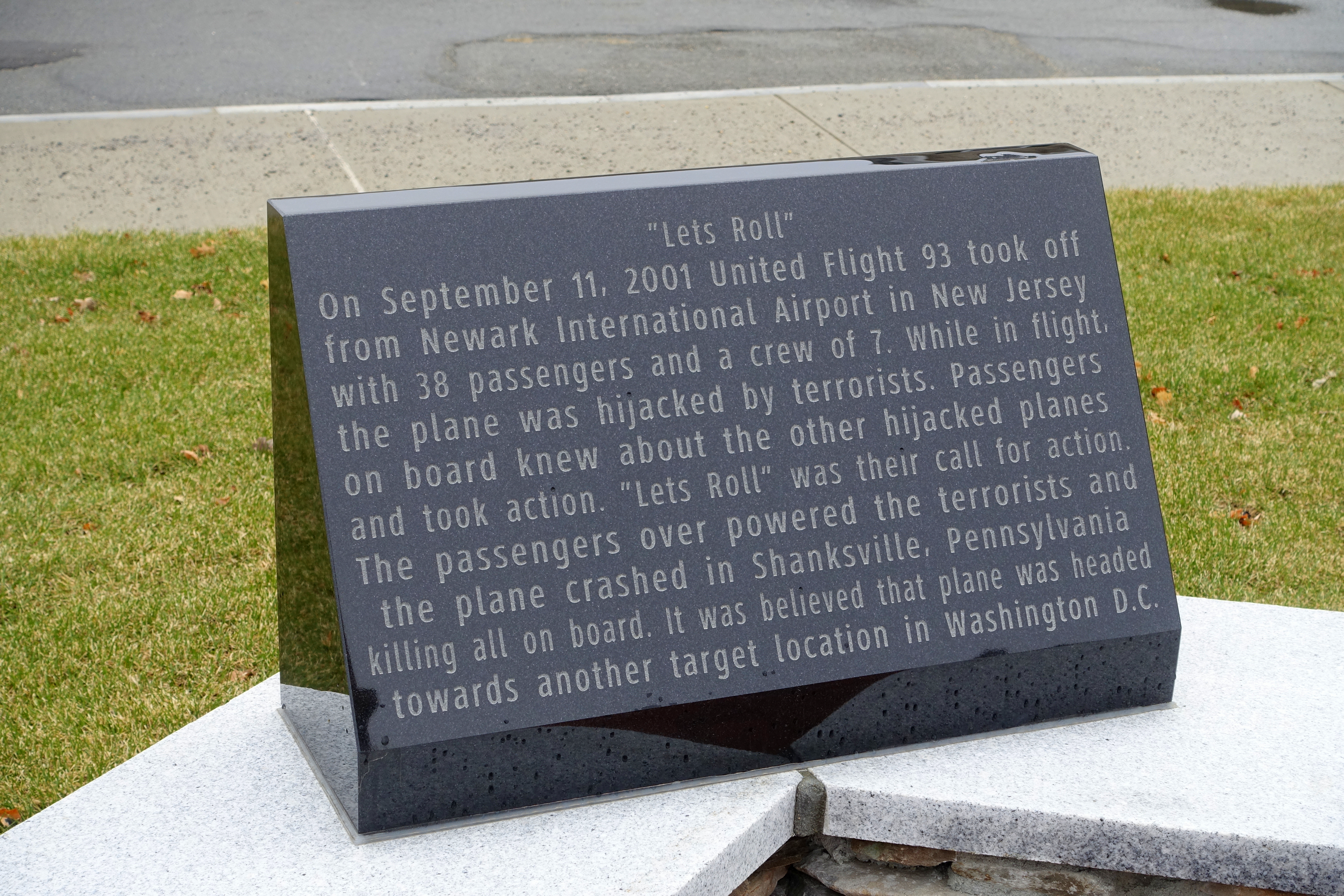
Memorial inscription of "Let's Roll" in Westborough, Massachusetts, in memory of United Airlines Flight 93 during the September 11 attacks in 2001.

"Let's roll" is a colloquialism that has been used extensively as a command to move and start an activity, attack, mission or project. They were the last recorded words of passenger Todd Beamer on board United Airlines Flight 93 during the September 11 attacks in 2001, before he and other passengers attempted to storm the cockpit and retake the plane from the hijackers, decades after the phrase originated. The slogan subsequently became a battle cry for American forces during the war on terror.

== Origins ==
In the American west, many wagon trains began their journeys with the shout "Wagons roll!" from the head of the train. A less formal terminology would soon develop from the historic precedent. The phrase, "let's roll" has been used as early as 1908 in the cadence song now called "The Army Goes Rolling Along", which likely extended into tank usage.

"The Roads Must Roll", a science fiction story written in 1940 by Robert A. Heinlein, mentions a re-worded version of "The Roll of the Caissons" called "Road Songs of the Transport Cadets". The protagonist of the 1937 supernatural comedy, Topper, played by Cary Grant, uses the phrase "Let's roll" to his wife, played by Constance Bennett, to indicate they should immediately exit their friend's stuffy office and find a drink. The protagonist of Ernest Hemingway's 1950 novel Across the River and into the Trees, Colonel Dick Cantwell, based on World War II commander Charles "Buck" Lanham, uses the phrase to his driver. The verb "roll" has been used in both the film and recording industry to signal the beginning of a film or audio recording.

== September 11 attacks ==
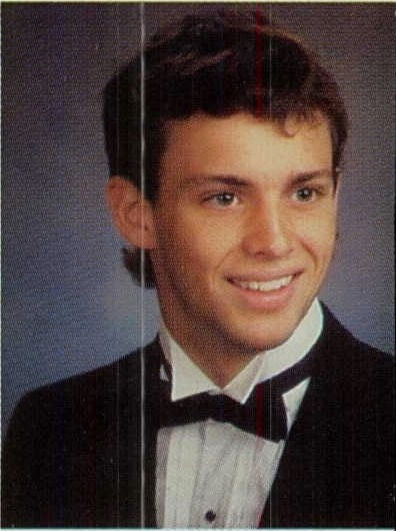
Beamer's senior portrait c. 1986–1987

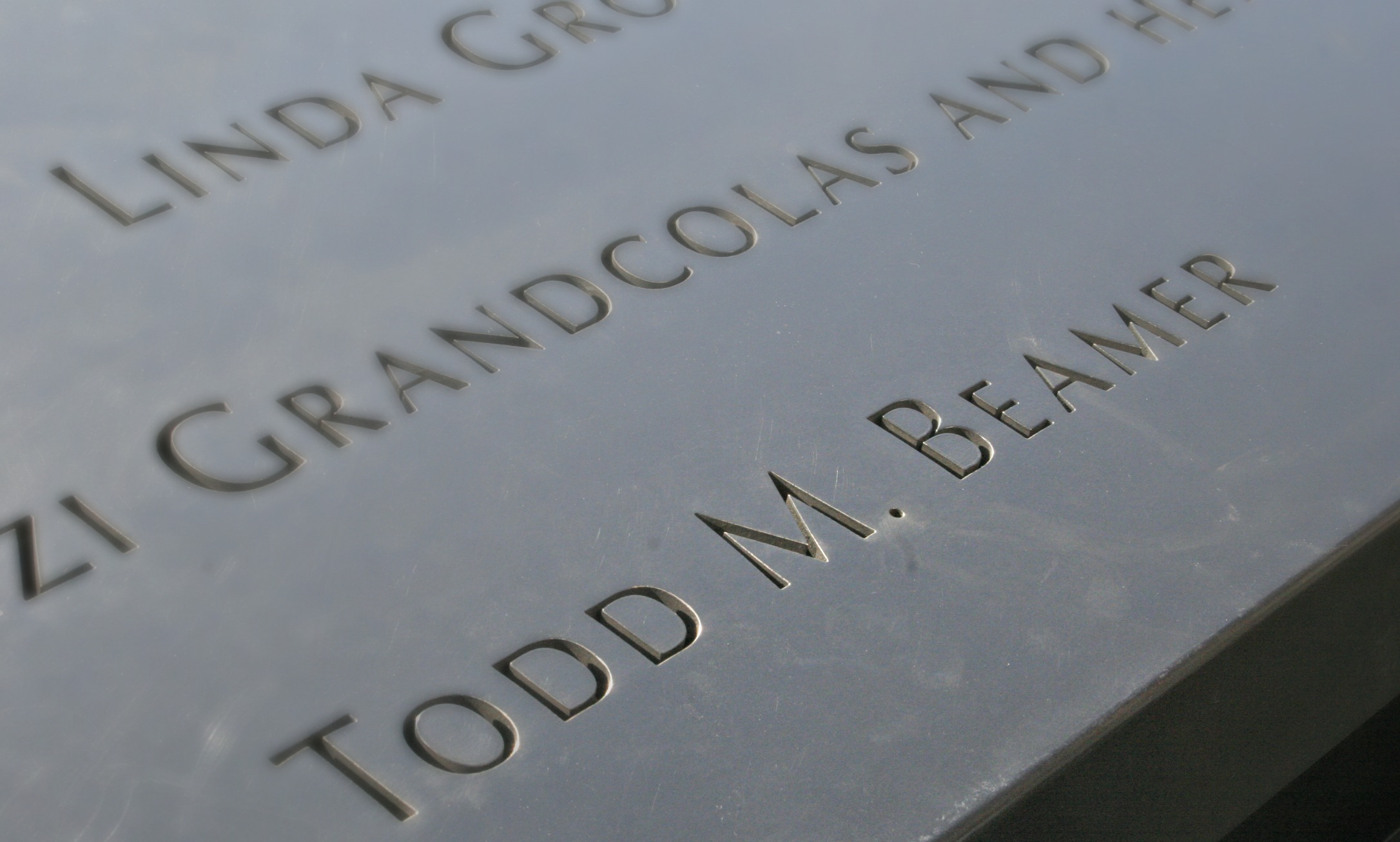
Todd Beamer's name on Panel S-68 of the National September 11 Memorial's South Pool.

On September 11, 2001, Todd Beamer, a passenger on the hijacked United Airlines Flight 93, tried to place a call through an airfone, but he was routed to a customer service representative instead, who passed him on to supervisor Lisa Jefferson. Beamer reported that one passenger had been killed and that a flight attendant had told him that both the pilot and co-pilot had been forced from the cockpit and may have been injured. He was also on the phone when the plane made a quick and violent turn. Later, he told the operator that some of the other passengers were planning to attack the hijackers and regain control of the aircraft, after they learned about what happened at the World Trade Center and The Pentagon. According to Jefferson, Beamer's last audible words were "Are you ready? Okay. Let's roll."

In a November 8, 2001 address from the World Congress Center in Atlanta, Georgia, President George W. Bush invoked Beamer's words: "Some of our greatest moments have been acts of courage for which no one could have been prepared. But we have our marching orders. My fellow Americans, let's roll!" He used them again in the 2002 State of the Union address: "For too long our culture has said, 'If it feels good, do it.' Now America is embracing a new ethic and a new creed: 'Let's roll.'"

== Cultural impact ==
=== Songs ===
- Several musicians and bands have written songs entitled or including the phrase "Let's Roll", with the songs typically referring to Flight 93 or Todd Beamer. The first song with the name, Neil Young's "Let's Roll", was released as a single in November 2001, and was later included in his album Are You Passionate?. The following year, three diverse groups released songs: hard rock group L.A. Guns included "OK, Let's Roll" in their album Waking the Dead, country music duo The Bellamy Brothers's song "Let's Roll, America" was on Redneck Girls Forever, and Christian rock group DC Talk recorded and released a single entitled "Let's Roll" despite being on hiatus.
- Three other 9/11-related songs by the name "Let's Roll" have been released in the following years. Montreal rock band The Stills's song was included on their debut album Logic Will Break Your Heart in 2003. Jonny L's song included a sample of President George W. Bush's 2002 State of the Union address which included the phrase. In 2004, Ray Stevens offered up the self-penned "Let's Roll" and referenced Todd Beamer in the lyrics. Stevens' recording appeared on his 2004 Thank You! CD. The recording later appeared on his 2005 Box Set project and on his 2010 We the People project.
- Melissa Etheridge's 2004 song "Tuesday Morning", written in honor of Flight 93 passenger Mark Bingham, concluded with the phrase, "Let's roll".

=== Government ===
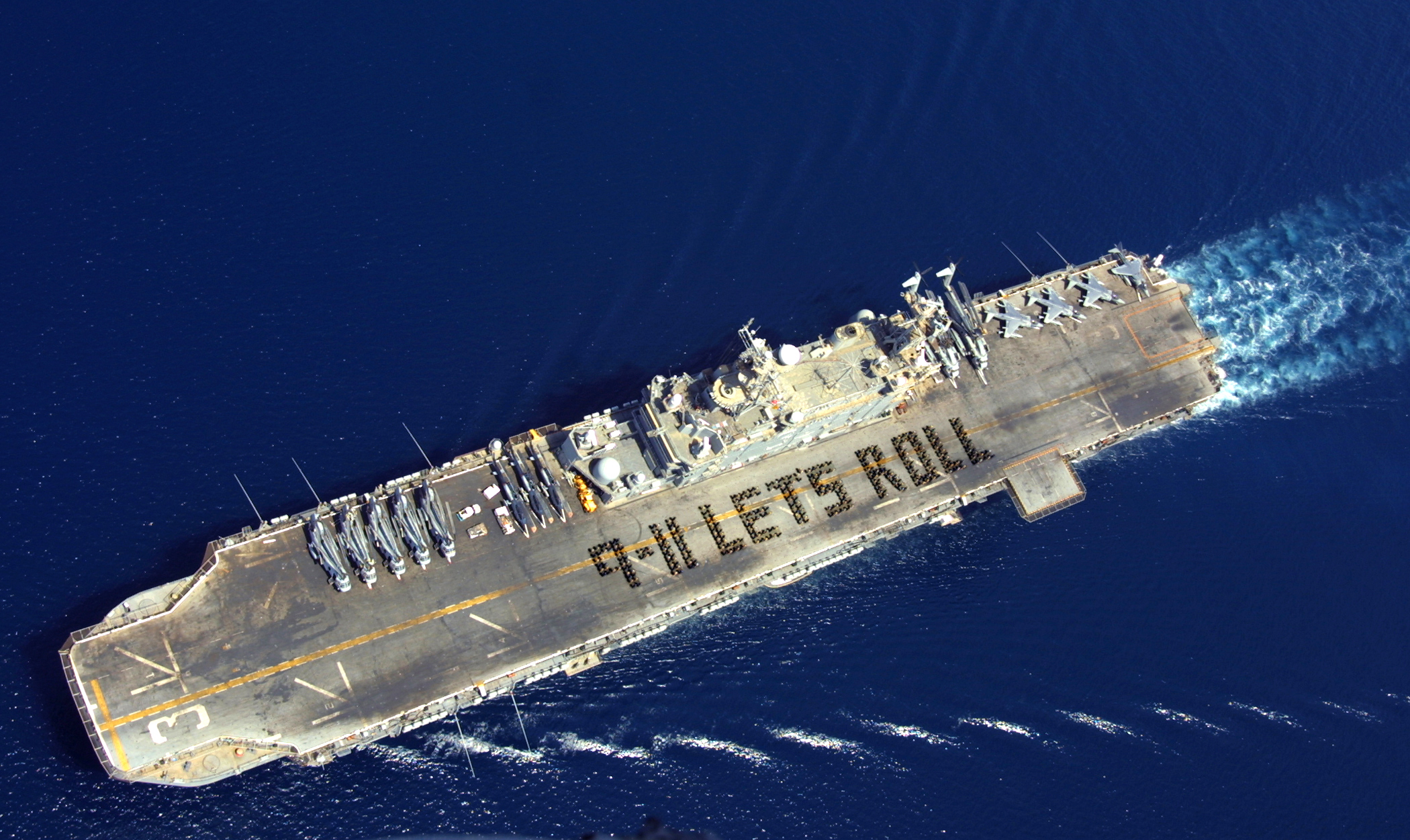
Sailors and Marines onboard USS Belleau Wood (LHA-3) spelling out the quote "Let's Roll".

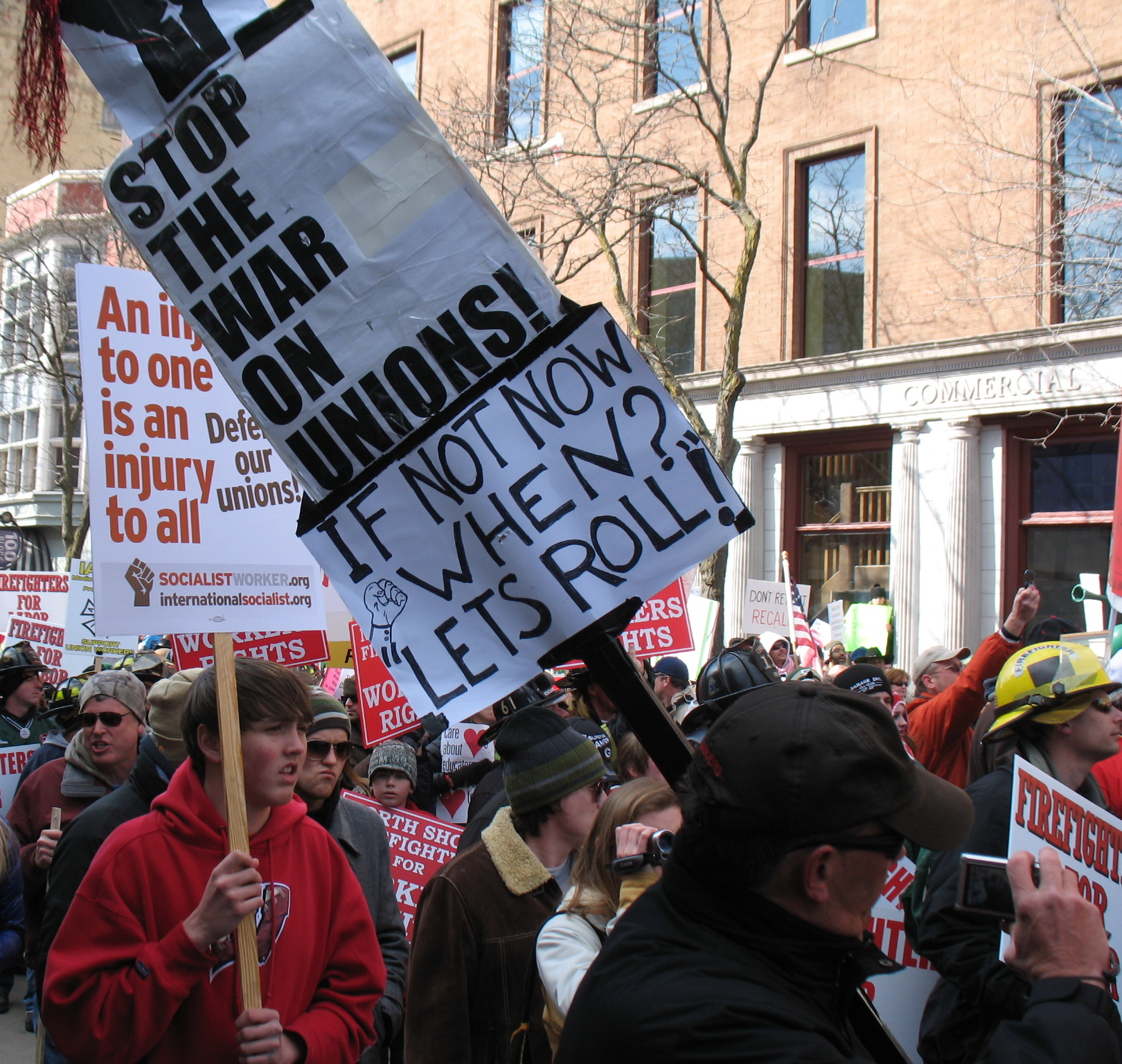
Pro-trade union protester during the 2011 Wisconsin protests holds a sign with the phrase

- The phrase became especially known and popular after being used by President George W. Bush in a speech to AmeriCorps volunteers and during his 2002 State of the Union address. Even though the phrase was in common use long before September 11, many soon tried to lay claim to it as a trademark. The Todd M. Beamer Foundation was eventually granted a trademark for uses of the phrase relating to "pre-recorded compact discs, audio tapes, digital audio tapes, and phonograph records featuring music."
- In early 2002, United States Air Force Chief of Staff Gen. John P. Jumper ordered that one airplane in each USAF squadron and all USAF demonstration planes would bear an image of an eagle on an American flag with the words "Let's Roll" and "Spirit of 9-11", to remain until the first anniversary of the attack. It was also used by Lisa Beamer, widow of Todd, in a 2003 book titled Let's Roll: Ordinary People, Extraordinary Courage.

=== Sports ===
- In the 2002 college football season, the Florida State Seminoles used "Let's Roll" as their official team slogan. After an initial uproar against the team by people who considered its usage in bad taste, the Todd M. Beamer Foundation officially licensed the trademark to the team.
- NASCAR driver Bobby Labonte drove a 9/11 tribute car with the words "Let's Roll" on the hood of his stock car in the 2002 MBNA All-American Heroes 400 at Dover International Speedway.
- Detroit Red Wings goaltender Jimmy Howard has the inscription "Lets Roll" on the back of his goalie helmet in reference to Flight 93.

=== Media ===
- The phrase was also used in an episode of HBO's Curb Your Enthusiasm ("The Survivor", season 4, episode 9). The show's main character, Larry David, says the phrase inadvertently to his rabbi once he and his wife are ready to go out and renew their vows, who then becomes offended because of a relative of his died on September 11, 2001 ("You knew my brother-in-law died on September 11th; how dare you say something like that?!"). Larry takes issue with this, as his rabbi's relative was hit by a bike messenger ("Well, with all due respect, wasn't that just a coincidence?"), in an incident completely unrelated to the 9/11 terrorist attacks.
- The phrase was used in the film: Let's Roll: The Story of Flight 93, which is a dramatized reconstruction of Flight 93.
- The phrase was used by the character Optimus Prime in the 2009 movie Transformers: Revenge of the Fallen.
