= CeeCee Lyles =

American flight attendant and former police detective (1967-2001)

- Lyles in her flight attendant's uniform, early 2001.
- Born: November 26, 1967; Fort Pierce, Florida
- Died: September 11, 2001 (aged 33); Stonycreek Township, Pennsylvania
- Cause of death: Plane crash during the September 11 attacks
- Occupations: Flight attendant, former police detective
- Known for: United Airlines Flight 93
- Children: 4
- Awards: Congressional Gold Medal
- Lyles' voice Voicemail made by CeeCee Lyles; Recorded September 11, 2001

CeeCee Ross Lyles (November 26, 1967 – September 11, 2001) was an American flight attendant and former police detective. She is best known for her actions on September 11, 2001, when she, together with passengers, fought back against the hijackers who seized United Airlines Flight 93. She died when the flight crashed into a field in Pennsylvania. A statue of her sits in her hometown of Fort Pierce, Florida.

== Biography ==
Lyles was born on November 26, 1967 in Fort Pierce. She attended Fort Pierce Westwood Academy, and spent six years working in the police department of Fort Pierce, Florida, starting as a patrol officer and eventually becoming a detective. She gained a reputation for being willing to step up to any challenge. However, she had long dreamed of becoming a flight attendant in order to travel, and after moving to Fort Myers in 2000 when her husband became a police officer there, in January 2001 completed her training to become a flight attendant with United Airlines.

She was a flight attendant on United Airlines Flight 93 on September 11, 2001. She left a voicemail for her husband, stating in part "They've hijacked the plane... I'm trying to be calm. We've turned around and I've heard that there's been planes that have flown into the World Trade Center. I hope to be able to see your face again, baby. I love you, bye."

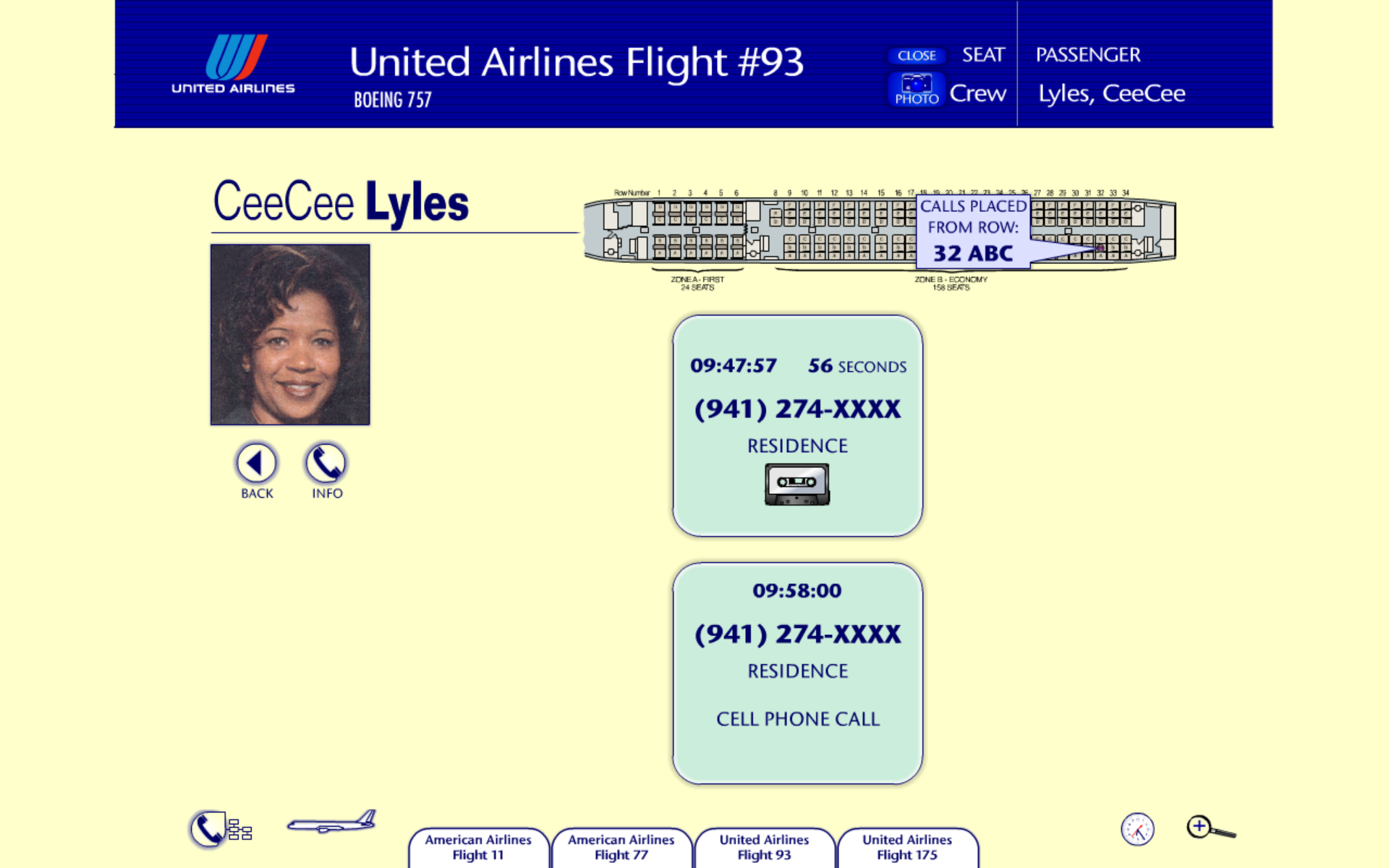
CeeCee Lyles phone call details

She then participated in the planning, along with the rest of the passengers and crew, to fight back against the hijackers, including using boiling water. Her husband later called back, and they prayed together briefly, before she ended the call with "We're getting ready to do it now. It's happening!" She went on to, along with the passengers and remaining crew, storm the cockpit of the plane. The plane ultimately crashed in a field in Shanksville, Pennsylvania, killing everyone onboard. Their fight, however, is attributed with preventing the flight from making it to Washington, D.C. to crash into a crowded building.

== Personal life ==
She had two children and two step-children with her husband, Lorne Lyles, who served as a police dispatcher. In 2025, one of her sons, Jevon, obtained a letter she wrote to his teacher the same year she died, and read it during an interview with WPTV.

== Legacy ==
Personal effects of CeeCee Lyles that were recovered from the Flight 93 crash site

A statue of her was unveiled on November 28, 2003 in Fort Pierce, where she was described as a "hometown hero" by State Senator Ken Pruitt. Memorial ceremonies have been held for her in Fort Pierce every year on September 11, as of 2025, though the 2022 ceremony was virtual. She received a posthumous Congressional Gold Medal for her actions on United Airlines Flight 93. Recordings of Lyles's voicemail to her husband are included in exhibits at the Flight 93 National Memorial and the National September 11 Memorial & Museum. Ahead of the 9/11 Museum's opening, museum director Alice Greenwald remarked how composed Lyles sounded in the recording during the hijacking.
