= United Airlines Flight 93 =

Hijacked 9/11 flight; passengers fought back

- UA 93's flight path from Newark, New Jersey, to Stonycreek Township, Somerset County, Pennsylvania

Hijacking
- Date: September 11, 2001
- Summary: Terrorist suicide hijacking
- Site: Field (Flight 93 National Memorial) just north of Shanksville in Stonycreek Township, Pennsylvania, U.S.; 40°03′02″N 78°54′17″W

Aircraft
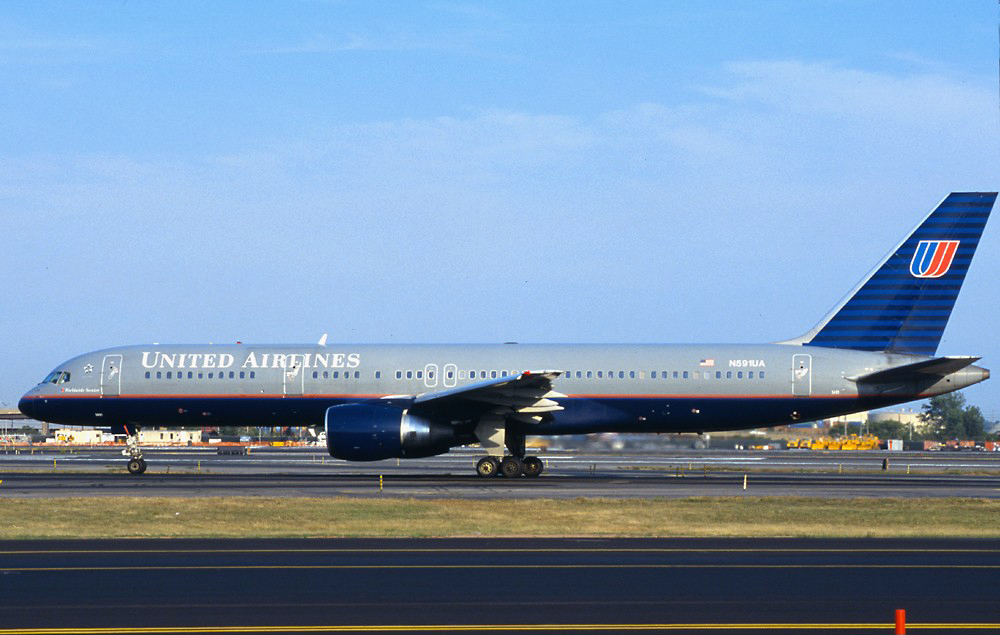
- N591UA, the aircraft involved, seen three days before the hijacking
- Aircraft type: Boeing 757-222 (Note: The aircraft was a Boeing 757-200 model; Boeing assigns a unique code for each company that buys one of its aircraft, which is applied as an infix to the model number at the time the aircraft is built, hence "757-222" designates a 757-200 built for United Airlines (customer code 22).)
- Operator: United Airlines
- IATA flight No.: UA93
- ICAO flight No.: UAL93
- Call sign: UNITED 93
- Registration: N591UA
- Flight origin: Newark International Airport (now called Newark Liberty International Airport), Newark, New Jersey, U.S.
- Destination: San Francisco International Airport
- Occupants: 44 (including 4 hijackers)
- Passengers: 37 (including 4 hijackers)
- Crew: 7
- Fatalities: 44 (including 4 hijackers)
- Survivors: 0

United Airlines Flight 93 was an American domestic passenger flight from Newark International Airport in New Jersey to San Francisco International Airport in California that was hijacked by four al-Qaeda terrorists on the morning of September 11, 2001, as part of the September 11 attacks. The hijackers planned to crash the aircraft into a federal government building in Washington, D.C. However, after passengers and crew members fought back in an attempt to regain control of the plane, their primary mission failed and the terrorists were forced to crash the plane into a field near Shanksville, Pennsylvania, killing all 44 aboard the flight.

Forty-six minutes after the Boeing 757 took off at 8:42 a.m. EDT, the hijackers killed one passenger, stormed the cockpit, struggled with the pilots as controllers on the ground listened in, and moved the remaining passengers and crew members to the rear of the aircraft. Lead hijacker Ziad Jarrah, who had trained as a pilot, took control of the aircraft and diverted it back toward the East Coast, in the direction of D.C. Khalid Sheikh Mohammed and Ramzi bin al-Shibh, considered principal planners of the attacks, have claimed that the intended target was the U.S. Capitol Building, though government officials also state that the intended target alternatively may have been the White House.

Meanwhile, as passengers and crew members began calling ground contacts and family members to relay information on the hijacking, they discovered the hijackers' intentions. Because the flight's takeoff had been delayed by 42 minutes and the hijacking began 46 minutes after that, it allowed them to learn through these calls that other hijacked planes had already carried out suicide attacks against the Twin Towers of the World Trade Center and the Pentagon shortly before. Realizing that their flight was likely being hijacked as part of a suicide mission, they decided to fight back. In the ensuing struggle, Jarrah chose to prevent the passengers from taking over the controls by crashing the plane into a field near a reclaimed strip mine, 130 miles (210 km) northwest of the capital at 10:03 a.m. A witness reported the crash, and news agencies began reporting on the event within an hour.

Flight 93 was the fourth and final passenger jet to be commandeered by terrorists on September 11 and the only one that did not reach a target intended by al-Qaeda. The hijacking was supposed to be coordinated with that of American Airlines Flight 77, which struck the Pentagon 26 minutes before the crash of Flight 93. A temporary memorial was built near the crash site soon after the attacks. Construction of a permanent Flight 93 National Memorial was dedicated on September 10, 2011, and a concrete and glass visitor center situated on a hill overlooking the site was opened exactly four years later.

== Hijackers ==
United Airlines Flight 93 hijackers

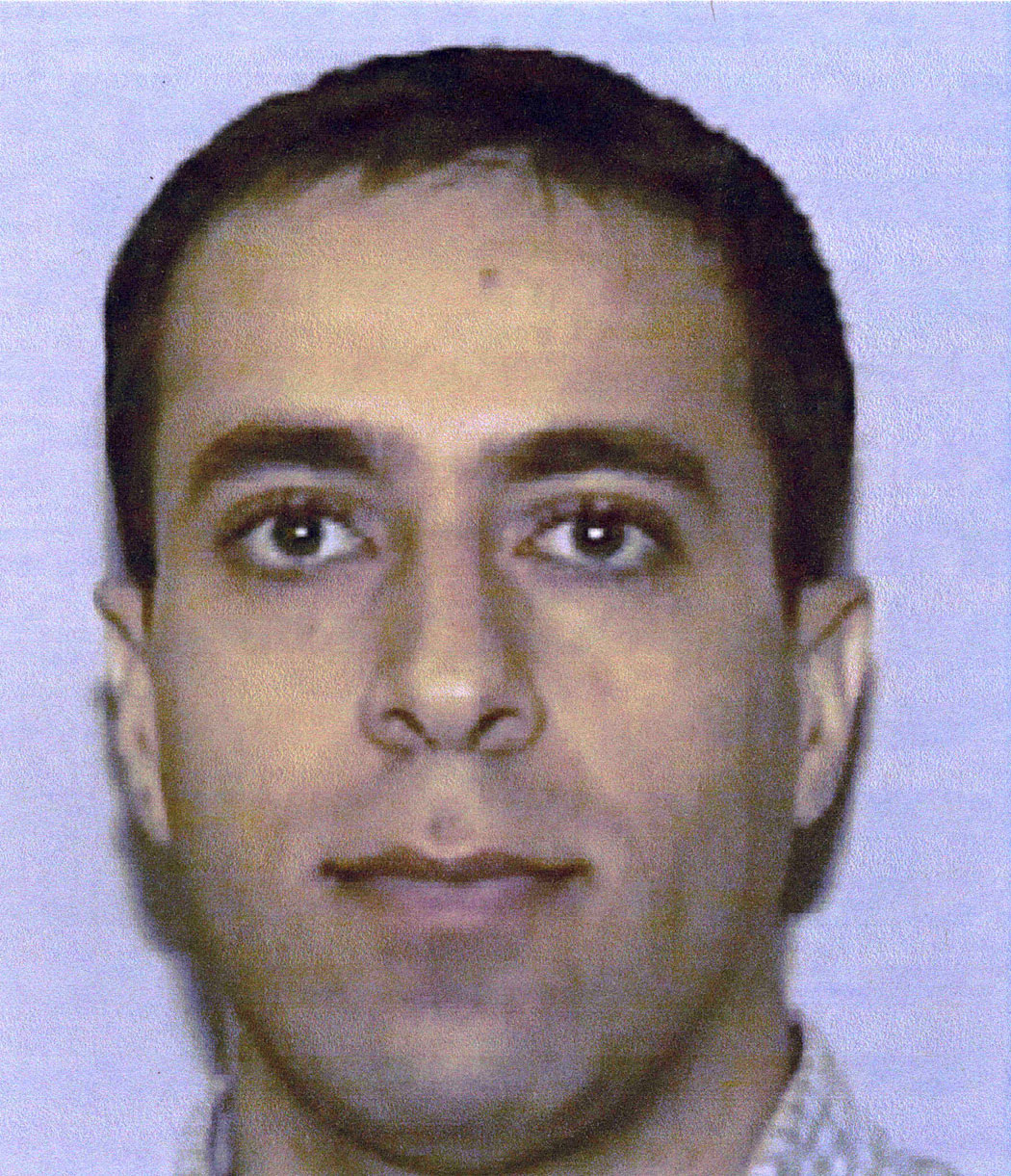
Ziad Jarrah (pilot)

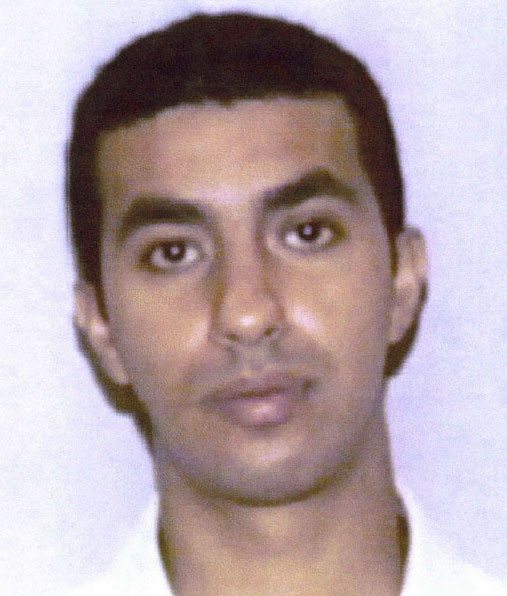
Ahmed al-Haznawi

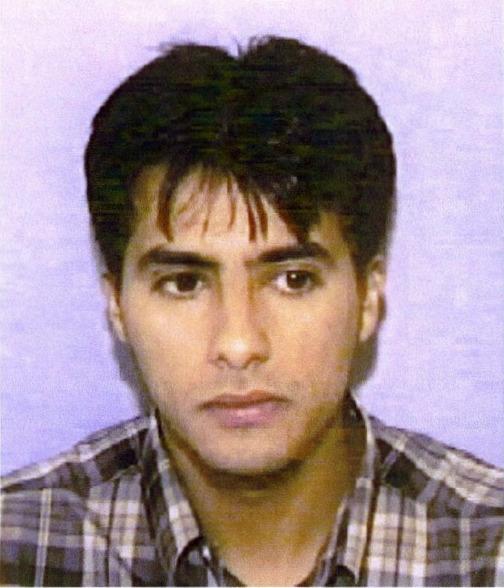
Ahmed al-Nami

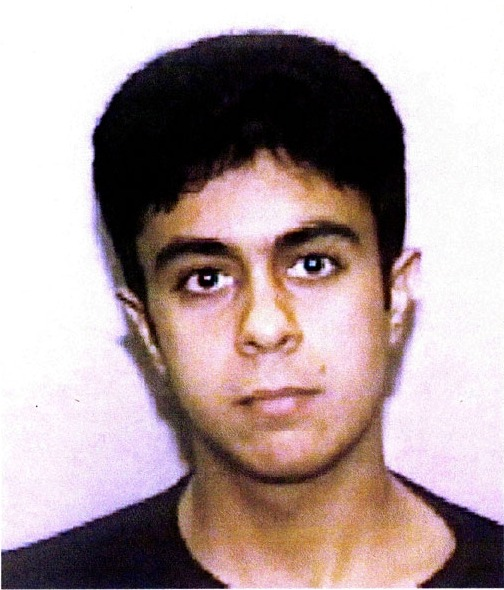
Saeed al-Ghamdi

The hijacking of Flight 93 was led by Ziad Jarrah, a member of the terrorist organization al-Qaeda. He was born in Lebanon to a wealthy and secular Muslim family. He intended to become a pilot and moved to Germany in 1996, enrolling at the University of Greifswald to study German. A year later, he moved to Hamburg and began studying aeronautical engineering at the Hamburg University of Applied Sciences. In Hamburg, Jarrah became a devout Muslim and associated with the radical Hamburg cell.

In November 1999, Jarrah left Hamburg for Afghanistan, where he spent three months. While there, he met with al-Qaeda leader Osama bin Laden in January 2000. Jarrah returned to Hamburg at the end of January and in February obtained a new passport containing no stamped records of his travels by reporting his passport as stolen.

In May, Jarrah received a visa from the U.S. Embassy in Berlin, arriving in Florida in June 2000. There, he began taking flying lessons and training in hand-to-hand combat. Jarrah maintained contact with his girlfriend in Germany and with his family in Lebanon in the months preceding the attacks. This close contact upset Mohamed Atta, the tactical leader of the plot, and al-Qaeda planners may have considered another operative, Zacarias Moussaoui, to replace him if he had backed out.

Four "muscle hijackers" were trained to storm the cockpit and overpower the crew, and three accompanied Jarrah on Flight 93. The first, Ahmed al-Nami, arrived in Miami, Florida, on May 28, 2001, on a six-month tourist visa with United Airlines Flight 175 hijackers Hamza al-Ghamdi and Mohand al-Shehri. The second, Ahmed al-Haznawi, arrived in Miami on June 8 with Flight 11 hijacker Wail al-Shehri. The third, Saeed al-Ghamdi, arrived in Orlando, Florida, on June 27 with Flight 175 hijacker Fayez Banihammad. Ziad Jarrah's and Saeed al-Ghamdi's passports were recovered from the Flight 93 crash site. Jarrah's family said he had been an "innocent passenger" aboard the flight.

Al-Qaeda had intended for the attacks to be carried out by four teams of five men each, but only 19 terrorists were able to participate when the day came. The missing 20th was allegedly Mohammed al-Qahtani, who flew into Orlando from Dubai on August 3, 2001, intending to board Flight 93 as its fifth hijacker (and fourth muscle hijacker) on September 11. He was questioned by officials, who were dubious that he could support himself with only $2,800 cash to his name, and suspicious that he planned to become an illegal immigrant as he was using a one-way ticket. He was sent back to Dubai, and subsequently returned to Saudi Arabia.

== Flight ==
The aircraft involved in the hijacking was a Boeing 757-222, registration N591UA delivered to United Airlines in 1996. The airplane had a capacity of 182 passengers. The September 11 flight carried 37 passengers, including the four terrorists, and seven crew members, with a load factor of 20 percent, considerably below the 52 percent average Tuesday load factor for Flight 93. The seven crew members were Captain Jason Dahl (43), First Officer LeRoy Homer Jr. (36), flight attendants Lorraine Bay, Sandra Bradshaw, Wanda Green, CeeCee Lyles, and purser Deborah Welsh.

=== Boarding ===
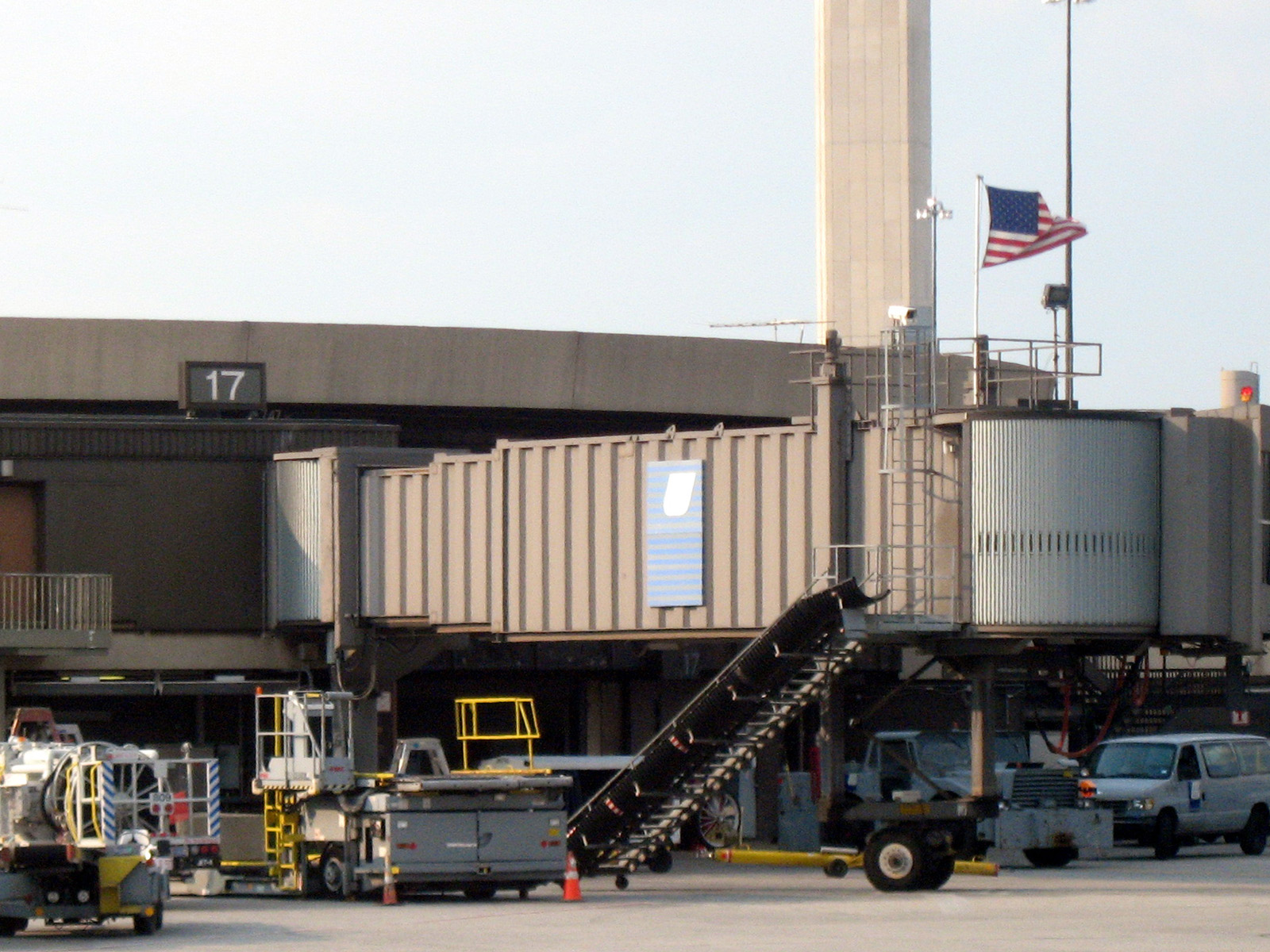
A U.S. flag flies over Gate 17 of Terminal A at Newark Liberty International Airport, departure gate of United 93.

At 5:01 a.m. on the morning of September 11, Jarrah placed a cell phone call from Newark to Marwan al-Shehhi, the hijacker pilot of United Airlines Flight 175, in Boston, which authorities believe was to confirm that the plan for the attacks was proceeding. While al-Shehhi is known to have also communicated with American Airlines Flight 11 hijacker Mohamed Atta on the morning of the attacks for the same reason he spoke to Jarrah, a similar correspondence did not take place between Jarrah and Hani Hanjour, the hijacker pilot of American Airlines Flight 77, with which the hijacking of Flight 93 was to be executed in tandem.

The four hijackers checked in for the flight between 07:03 and 07:39 Eastern Time. At 07:03, al-Ghamdi checked in without any luggage while al-Nami checked in two bags. At 07:24, al-Haznawi checked in one bag and at 07:39, Jarrah checked in without any luggage. Al-Haznawi was the only hijacker selected for extra scrutiny by the Computer Assisted Passenger Prescreening System (CAPPS). His checked bag underwent extra screening for explosives, with no extra scrutiny required by CAPPS at the passenger-security checkpoint. None of the security checkpoint personnel reported anything unusual about the hijackers.

Al-Haznawi and al-Ghamdi boarded the aircraft at 07:39 and sat in first class seats 6B and 3D respectively. Al-Nami boarded one minute later and sat in first class seat 3C. Before boarding the plane, Jarrah made five telephone calls to Lebanon, one to France, and one to his girlfriend in Germany; he had sent a farewell letter the day before to say he loved her. He boarded at 07:48 and sat in seat 1B. Many of those aboard Flight 93 would have had a view of the Twin Towers of the World Trade Center complex in New York City, located several miles away across the Hudson River. The aircraft was scheduled to depart at 08:00 and pushed back from gate A17 at 08:01. It remained delayed on the ground until 08:42 because of heavy airport congestion.

=== Hijack warnings issued ===
The three other hijacked flights all departed within fifteen minutes of their scheduled times. By the time Flight 93 became airborne, Flight 11 was within four minutes of crashing into the North Tower and Flight 175 was being hijacked. The terrorists aboard Flight 77 had not yet made their move, but were nine minutes away from storming the cockpit. At 09:02, one minute before Flight 175 hit the South Tower, Flight 93 reached its cruising altitude of 35,000 feet (11,000 m).

With the attacks unfolding, air traffic officials began issuing warnings through the Aircraft Communication Addressing and Reporting System (ACARS). Ed Ballinger, the United flight dispatcher, began sending text cockpit warnings to United Airlines flights at 09:19, sixteen minutes after Flight 175's impact. Ballinger was responsible for multiple flights, and he sent the message to Flight 93 at 09:23. Ballinger received a routine ACARS message from Flight 93 at 09:21.

At 09:22, after learning of the events at the World Trade Center, LeRoy Homer's wife, Melodie Homer, had an ACARS message sent to her husband in the cockpit asking if he was all right. At 09:24, Flight 93 received Ballinger's ACARS warning, "Beware any cockpit intrusion – two a/c [aircraft] hit World Trade Center". At 09:26, pilot Jason Dahl, apparently puzzled by the message, responded, "Ed, confirm latest mssg plz -- Jason" (meaning: "Ed, confirm your latest message please - Jason"). At 09:27:25, the flight crew responded to routine radio traffic from air traffic control. This was the last communication made by the flight crew before the plane was hijacked.

== Hijacking ==
"Mayday – 09:28:17"
First mayday call at 09:28:17 made by LeRoy Homer.

"Mayday – 09:28:50"
Second mayday call at 09:28:50 made by LeRoy Homer.

"Attempts to communicate with Flight 93 – after 09:28 am"

The cockpit was breached at 09:28, by which point Flights 11 and 175 had crashed into the World Trade Center; the North Tower had been burning for nearly 42 minutes and the South Tower for 25 minutes. The only other plane still in the air, Flight 77, was within nine minutes of striking the Pentagon. The hijackers on those flights had waited no more than half an hour to commandeer the aircraft, most likely striking after the seat belt sign had been turned off and cabin service had begun. It is unknown why the hijackers on Flight 93 waited 46 minutes to storm the cockpit. The evidence is that they attacked the pilots by at least 09:28:05, because the flight dived dramatically at that point – roughly 685 feet in thirty seconds.

=== Cockpit transmissions and recordings ===
At 09:28:17, ATC employees at Cleveland and the pilots of aircraft in Flight 93's vicinity picked up on "unintelligible sounds of possible screaming or a struggle". A Cleveland air traffic controller replied, "Somebody call Cleveland?" but received no response. Thirty-five seconds later, the aircraft made another transmission. In both calls, a man was shouting, "Mayday! Mayday! Get out of here! We're all gonna die here!" When Melodie Homer and Sandy Dahl, both pilots' widows, listened to the tape, Melodie identified First Officer LeRoy Homer as the man who was shouting.

On the morning of September 11, Flight 93 was the only hijacked aircraft to broadcast a distress call. It is likely that because the pilots had been made aware of the suicide attacks on the World Trade Center and were on alert for cockpit intrusion, when they came under attack, they keyed the microphone so the struggle might be overheard by controllers on the ground. Cleveland Center air traffic controller John Werth believed it was not just a call for help but a warning.

The exact time at which Flight 93 came under the hijackers' control cannot be determined. Officials believe that at around 09:28, the hijackers killed passenger Mark Rothenberg, assaulted the cockpit, and moved the remaining passengers and crew to the rear of the plane to minimize any chance that either the crew or the passengers would interfere with the attack. With many passengers saying in phone calls that they saw only three hijackers, the 9/11 Commission believed Jarrah remained seated until after the cockpit was seized and passengers were moved to the back of the aircraft and then took over the flight controls out of sight of the passengers. Then Ziad and Saeed took control of the plane.

Jarrah – 09:31:57
First announcement made by Ziad Jarrah, heard by ATC at 09:31.

Jarrah – 09:39:11
Second announcement made by Ziad Jarrah, heard by ATC at 09:39.

The cockpit voice recorder began recording the final thirty minutes of Flight 93 at 09:31:57. At this moment, it recorded Jarrah announcing, "Ladies and gentlemen: here the captain. [sic] Please sit down, keep remaining seating. [sic] We have a bomb on board. So sit." The commission believed Jarrah tried to make an announcement to the passengers, but pressed the wrong button, sending the message to Cleveland controllers; Mohamed Atta had made the same error on Flight 11. The controller understood the transmission, but responded, "Calling Cleveland center, you're unreadable. Say again, slowly."

The flight recordings indicate that a wounded man, believed to be Dahl, was moaning in the cockpit. The man pleaded, "No more," or "No," repeatedly, as the hijackers shouted for him to sit down and to stop touching something. Sandy believes that Dahl took actions to interfere with the hijackers, including possibly disengaging the autopilot, and rerouting the plane's radio frequency so that Jarrah's attempts to communicate with the passengers were instead transmitted to air traffic controllers.

A woman, thought to be first-class flight attendant Debbie Welsh, is heard being held captive in the background and is heard struggling with the hijackers and pleading, "Please, please, don't hurt me." Jarrah instructed the autopilot to turn the plane and head east at 09:35:09. The aircraft ascended to 40,700 feet (12,400 m) and air traffic controllers immediately moved several aircraft out of Flight 93's flightpath. The woman in the cockpit is heard to say, "I don't want to die, I don't want to die" before being killed or otherwise silenced, followed by one of the hijackers saying in Arabic, "Everything is fine. I finished."

At 09:39, two minutes after Flight 77 impacted the Pentagon, air traffic controllers overheard Jarrah say, "Hi, this is the captain: [sic] I would like to order you to remain seated. There's a bomb aboard, and we are going back to the airport, and we have our demands. So please remain quiet." Air traffic controllers did not hear from the flight again. According to the commission, the hijackers could have learned of the successful attacks on the World Trade Center from messages being sent by United Airlines to the cockpits of its transcontinental flights, including Flight 93, warning of cockpit intrusion and telling of the New York attacks.

In the cockpit, the wounded man continued to moan and seemingly repeatedly disengaged the autopilot, as at 09:40, there were horn sounds that indicated the hijackers were having trouble with the autopilot and were fiddling with a green knob. "This green knob?" one of the hijackers asks the other in Arabic. Another hijacker responded, "Yes, that's the one." At 09:41:56, the wounded man, in a moaning tone, said, "Oh, man!". As the man continued moaning, the hijackers were heard to say "Inform them, and tell him to talk to the pilot; bring the pilot back". As the moaning man was thought to be Dahl, the hijackers might have possibly been referring to Homer, suggesting he was also still alive. A United employee in San Francisco sent an ACARS message to the flight at 09:46, "Heard report of incident. Plz confirm all is normal."

=== Passenger and crew phone calls ===
Passengers and crew began making phone calls to officials and family members starting at 09:30 using GTE airphones and mobile phones. Altogether, the passengers and crew made 35 airphone calls and two cell phone calls from the flight. Ten passengers and two crew members were able to connect, providing information to family, friends, and others on the ground.

Tom Burnett made several phone calls to his wife, Deena, beginning at 09:30:32 from rows 24 and 25, though he was assigned a seat in row 4. Burnett explained that the plane had been hijacked by men claiming to have a bomb. He also said a passenger had been stabbed with a knife and that he believed the bomb threat was a ruse to control the passengers. Burnett said the stabbed passenger was dead, having failed to exhibit signs of a pulse. The true nature of the mission came to light only six minutes after the hijacking commenced, when Burnett's wife informed him of the attacks on the World Trade Center.

From there, Burnett was quickly able to piece together the hijackers' true intentions, replying that he had overheard the hijackers talking about "crashing this plane..." before arriving at the shocked conclusion: "Oh, my God. It's a suicide mission." He began asking her for information about the attacks, interrupting her from time to time to tell other passengers nearby what she was saying. He then hung up. In his next call, Deena informed Burnett of the attack on the Pentagon. Burnett relayed this to the other passengers and told Deena he and a group of other passengers were putting together a plan to take control of the plane. He ended his last call by saying, "Don't worry, we're going to do something."

An unknown flight attendant attempted to contact the United Airlines maintenance facility at 09:32:29 from row 34. The call lasted 95 seconds, but was not received as it may have been in queue. Flight attendant Sandra Bradshaw called the maintenance facility at 09:35:40 from row 33. She reported the flight had been hijacked by men with knives who were in the cabin and flight deck and had stabbed another flight attendant, possibly Debbie Welsh. Another unknown flight attendant attempted to contact the United Airlines maintenance facility at 09:35:56 from row 33.

It is believed that the murdered passenger mentioned by Burnett was Mark Rothenberg. Rothenberg was the only first class passenger who did not make a phone call after the hijacking. He was seated in 5B, and al-Haznawi sat directly behind him in 6B. On Flight 11, Satam al-Suqami, in seat 10B, attacked passenger Daniel Lewin, who was seated directly in front of him in 9B. One assumption is that Haznawi attacked Rothenberg, unprovoked, to frighten other passengers and crew into compliance. Alternatively, Rothenberg may have attempted to stop the hijacking and confront the hijackers.

Mark Bingham called his mother at 09:37:03 from row 25. He reported that the plane had been hijacked by three men who claimed to have a bomb. Jeremy Glick called his wife at 09:37:41 from row 27 and told her the flight was hijacked by three dark-skinned men who looked "Iranian", wearing red bandanas and wielding knives. Glick remained connected until the end of the flight. He reported that the passengers voted whether to "rush" the hijackers. The United air traffic control coordinator for West Coast flights, Alessandro "Sandy" Rogers, alerted the Federal Aviation Administration (FAA) Herndon Command Center in Herndon, Virginia, that Flight 93 was not responding and was off course. A minute later, the transponder was turned off, but the Cleveland controller continued to monitor the flight on primary radar. The Herndon Center relayed information on Flight 93 to FAA headquarters. Joseph DeLuca called his father at 09:43:03 from row 26 to inform him the flight had been hijacked.

"Jack, pick up sweetie, can you hear me? Okay. I just want to tell you, there's a little problem with the plane. I'm fine. I'm totally fine. I just want to tell you how much I love you."

— Message left by pregnant passenger Lauren Grandcolas at 09:39:21.

Passenger Lauren Grandcolas called her husband twice, once before takeoff and once during the hijacking at 09:39:21 from row 23. He missed both her calls. Grandcolas made 7 more calls in the next 4 minutes, then lent her phone to Marion Britton.

Todd Beamer attempted to call his wife from row 32 at 09:43:48, but was routed to GTE phone operator Lisa D. Jefferson. Beamer told the operator the flight had been hijacked and that two people who he thought were the pilots were on the floor, dead or injured. He said one of the hijackers had a red belt with what looked to be a bomb strapped to his waist. When the hijackers veered the plane sharply south, Beamer briefly panicked, exclaiming, "We're going down! We're going down!" Waleska Martinez attempted to call the Dratel Group at 09:45:37 from row 34, but she was unable to get through. Linda Gronlund called her sister, Elsa Strong, at 09:46:05 from row 26 and left her a message saying there were "men with a bomb".

CeeCee Lyles
Phone call made by CeeCee Lyles

Flight attendant CeeCee Lyles called her husband at 09:47:57 from row 32 and left him a message saying the plane had been hijacked. Marion Britton called her friend, Fred Fiumano, at 09:49:12 from row 33. Fiumano recalled, "she said, 'We're gonna. They're gonna kill us, you know, We're gonna die.' And I told her, 'Don't worry, they hijacked the plane, they're gonna take you for a ride, you go to their country, and you come back. You stay there for vacation.' You don't know what to say – what are you gonna say? I kept on saying the same things, 'Be calm.' And she was crying and ... screaming and yelling."

Flight attendant Sandra Bradshaw called her husband at 09:50:04 from row 33 and told him she was heating water to throw at the hijackers. Honor Elizabeth Wainio called her stepmother at 09:53:43 from row 33 and concluded, four and a half minutes later, by saying, "I have to go. They're breaking into the cockpit. I love you." Jarrah dialed in the VHF omnidirectional range (VOR) frequency for the VOR navigational aid at Reagan National Airport at 09:55:11 to direct the plane toward Washington, D.C.

Bradshaw, on the phone with her husband, said "Everyone is running up to first class. I've got to go. Bye." Beamer told Jefferson that he and a few passengers were getting together and were planning to "jump" the hijacker with the bomb. Beamer recited the Lord's Prayer and the 23rd Psalm with Jefferson, prompting others to join in. Beamer requested of Jefferson, "If I don't make it, please call my family and let them know how much I love them." After this, Jefferson heard muffled voices and Beamer answering, "Are you ready? Okay. Let's roll." These were Beamer's last words to Jefferson.

During the hijacking, Flight 93 passed within 1,000 feet (300 m) (instead of the normal 2,000 feet (610 m)) of a NASA KC-135 returning from a microgravity flight over Lake Ontario. NASA pilot Dominic Del Rosso recalled how odd the silence on the radio was that morning.

== Passenger revolt ==
"Are you guys ready? Okay. Let's roll!"

— Todd Beamer's last words heard by operator Lisa Jefferson.

The passenger revolt on Flight 93 began at 09:57, after the passengers voted on whether to act. The plane left its Washington, D.C., course after the passengers revolted and the hijackers began maneuvering the plane violently in response.

The hijackers in the cockpit became aware of the revolt at 09:57:55, Jarrah exclaiming, "Is there something? A fight?"

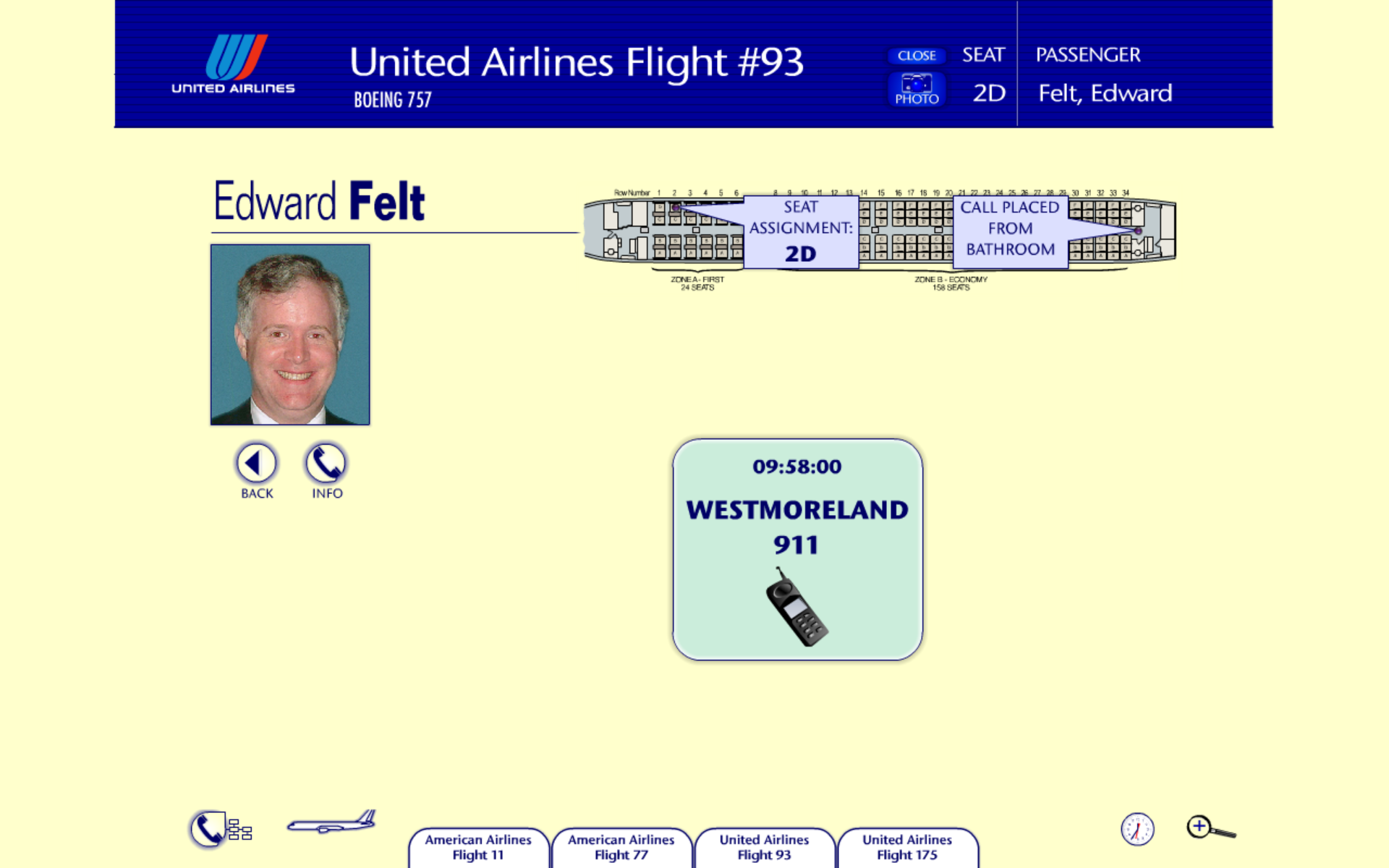
Edward Felt 911 call details

Edward Felt dialed 9-1-1 from his cell phone from the rear lavatory of the aircraft seeking information at 09:58. His call was answered by dispatcher John Shaw, and Felt was able to tell him about the hijacking before the call was disconnected. Multiple news reports (originally based on a 9-1-1 supervisor's account after having overheard the call) asserted that Edward Felt reported hearing an explosion and seeing smoke from an undetermined location on the plane. These reports were not corroborated by Shaw or Felt's wife, Sandra, who listened to the recording afterwards.

CeeCee Lyles called her husband once more from a cell phone and told him the passengers were forcing their way into the cockpit. Jarrah began to roll the airplane left and right to knock the passengers off balance. He told al-Ghamdi in the cockpit at 09:58:57, "They want to get in here. Hold, hold from the inside. Hold from the inside. Hold." Jarrah changed tactics at 09:59:52 and pitched the nose of the airplane up and down to disrupt the assault.

The cockpit voice recorder captured the sounds of crashing, screaming, and the shattering of glass and plates. Three times in a period of five seconds there were shouts of pain or distress from a hijacker outside the cockpit, suggesting a hijacker who was standing guard outside the cockpit was being attacked by the passengers. Jarrah stabilized the plane at 10:00:03. Five seconds later, he asked, "Is that it? Shall we finish it off?" al-Ghamdi responded, "No. Not yet. When they all come, we finish it off." Jarrah once again pitched the airplane up and down.

A passenger in the background cried, "In the cockpit! If we don't, we'll die!" at 10:00:25. Sixteen seconds later, another passenger yelled, "Roll it!", possibly referring to using the food cart. The voice recorder captured the sound of the passengers using the food cart as a battering ram against the cockpit door.

Jarrah ceased the violent maneuvers at 10:01:00 and recited the takbir twice. He then asked al-Ghamdi, "Is that it? I mean, shall we put it down?" al-Ghamdi responded, "Yes, put it in it, and pull it down." The passengers continued their assault and at 10:02:17, a male passenger said, "Turn it up!" A second later, al-Ghamdi said, "Pull it down! Pull it down!" At 10:02:33, Jarrah made a desperate plea in Arabic, repeatedly screaming "Give it to me!", possibly referring to the plane's yoke. At 10:03:02, amidst screams and shouts, al-Ghamdi, began shouting the takbir, his cries drowned out by a passenger shouting "No!"

The plane then crashed into an empty field in Stonycreek, Pennsylvania, about 20 minutes' flying time from Washington, D.C. The last entry on the voice recorder was made at 10:03:09. The last piece of flight data was recorded at 10:03:10.

There is disagreement among some family members of the passengers and the investigative officials as to whether the passengers managed to breach the cockpit or even break the cockpit door. The 9/11 Commission Report concluded that "the hijackers remained at the controls but must have judged that the passengers were only seconds from overcoming them". Many of the passengers' family members, having heard the audio recordings, believe the passengers breached the cockpit and killed at least one of the hijackers guarding the cockpit door; some interpreted the audio as suggesting that the passengers and hijackers struggled for control of the yoke.

Vice President Dick Cheney, in the Presidential Emergency Operations Center deep under the White House, authorized Flight 93 to be shot down but, upon learning of the crash, is reported to have said, "I think an act of heroism just took place on that plane."

== Crash ==
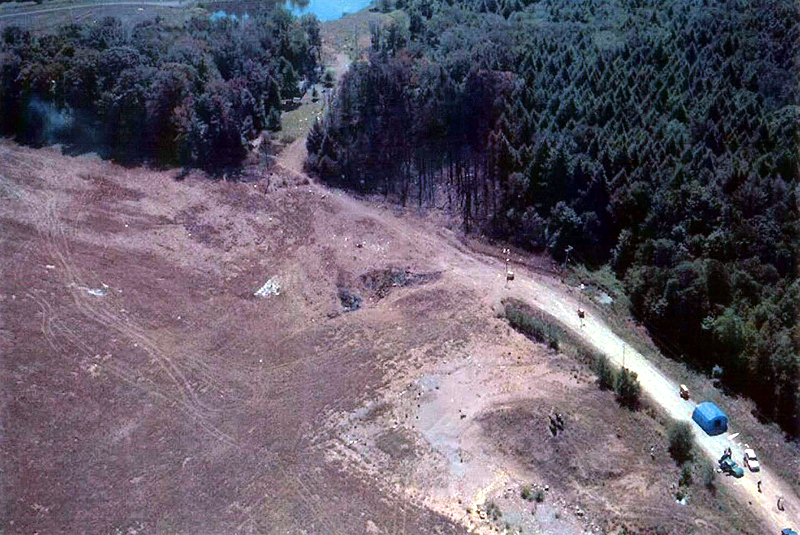
The Flight 93 crash site

At 10:03:11, near Shanksville, Pennsylvania, the plane crashed into a field near a reclaimed coal strip mine known as the Diamond T. Mine owned by PBS Coals in Stonycreek Township in Somerset County. The 757 had between 5,500 to 7,000 US gallons (21,000 to 26,000 L; 4,600 to 5,800 imp gal) of fuel remaining, which exploded and released a fireball that scorched a nearby hemlock grove. Far-flung debris that made up a third of the aircraft, including the cockpit, continued into the woods, demolishing trees on 163 acres (66 ha) owned by the Lambert family, and damaging the nearby residence of Barry Hoover. The rest of the aircraft buried itself in dirt that had been transported to the abandoned strip mine for reclamation efforts in the 1990s. The fuselage and wings shattered as they burrowed into the earth. One of the engines ended up in a catchment pond 2,000 feet (670 yd; 610 m) away from the main impact site.

The National Transportation Safety Board reported that the flight impacted at 563 mph (489 kn; 252 m/s; 906 km/h) at a forty-degree nose-down inverted attitude. The impact left a crater eight to ten feet (2.4 to 3.0 m) deep and thirty to fifty feet (9.1 to 15.2 m) wide. The coroner ruled that everyone on board who was still alive at the time of the crash died instantly of blunt-force trauma. Many media reports and eyewitness accounts said the time of the crash was 10:06 or 10:10; an initial analysis of seismographic data in the area concluded that the crash occurred at 10:06, but the 9/11 Commission report states that this analysis was not definitive and was retracted. Other media outlets and the 9/11 Commission reported the time of impact as 10:03, based on when the flight recorders stopped, analysis of radar data, infrared satellite data, and air traffic control transmissions.

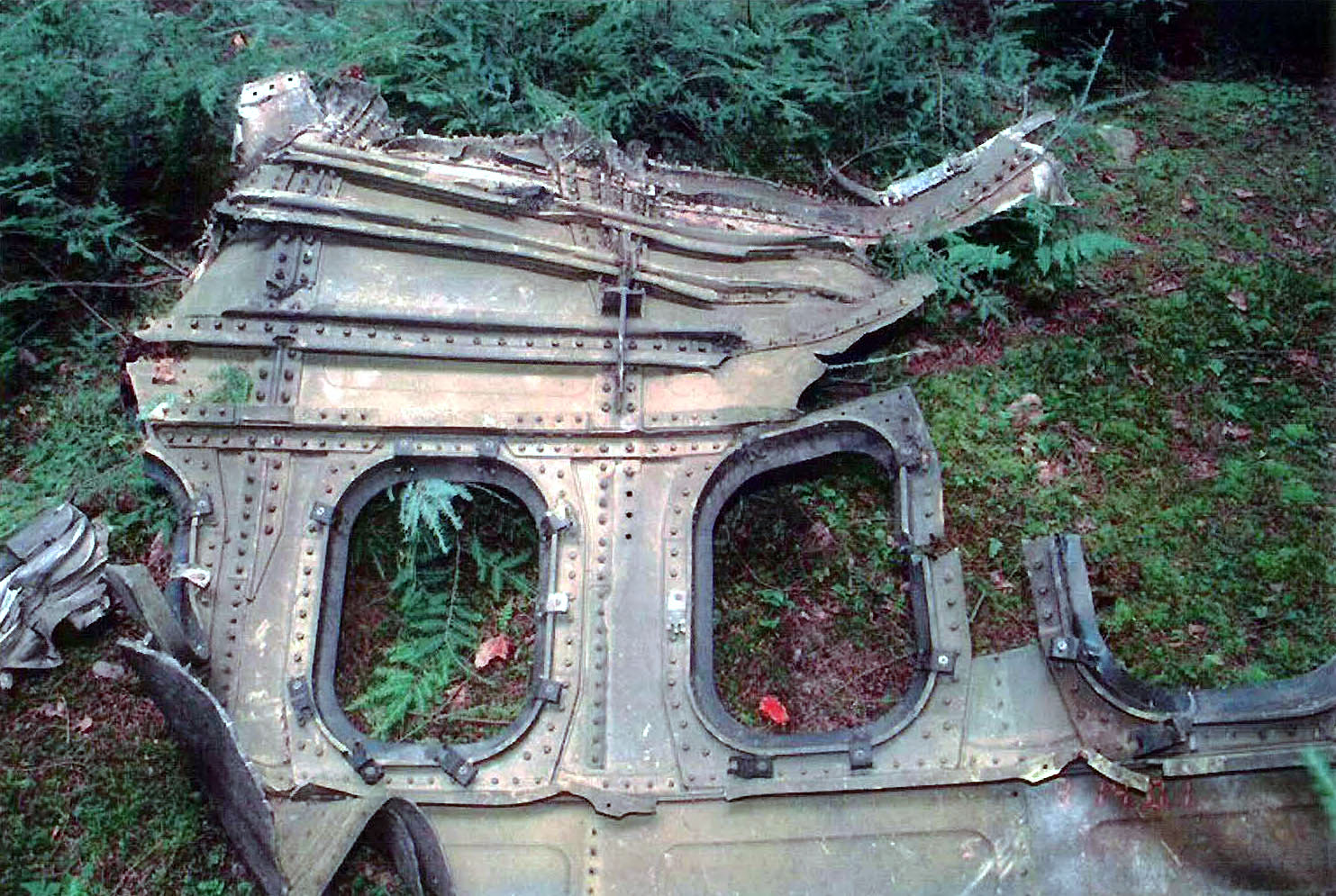
A piece of the fuselage

The only known witness to the actual crash, and the last one to see United 93 airborne, was Stoney Creek resident Nevin Lambert, who reported that he saw the plane upside down as it crashed to the ground in a 45 degree-angled nosedive. Kelly Leverknight, a local resident, was watching news of the attacks when she heard the plane. "I heard the plane going over and I went out the front door and I saw the plane going down. It was headed toward the school, which panicked me, because all three of my kids were there. Then you heard the explosion and felt the blast and saw the fire and smoke."

Another witness, Eric Peterson, looked up when he heard the plane, "It was low enough, I thought you could probably count the rivets. You could see more of the roof of the plane than you could the belly. It was on its side. There was a great explosion and you could see the flames. It was a massive, massive explosion. Flames and then smoke and then a massive, massive mushroom cloud."

Val McClatchey had been watching footage of the attacks when she heard the plane. She saw it briefly, then heard the impact. The crash knocked out the electricity and phones. McClatchey grabbed her camera and took the only known picture of the smoke cloud from the explosion. In September 2011, shortly before the 10th anniversary of the attacks, a video of the rising smoke cloud filmed by Dave Berkebile (who had died the previous February) from his yard on Bluebird Lane, 5.8 miles (9.3 km) away from the crash site, was published on YouTube.

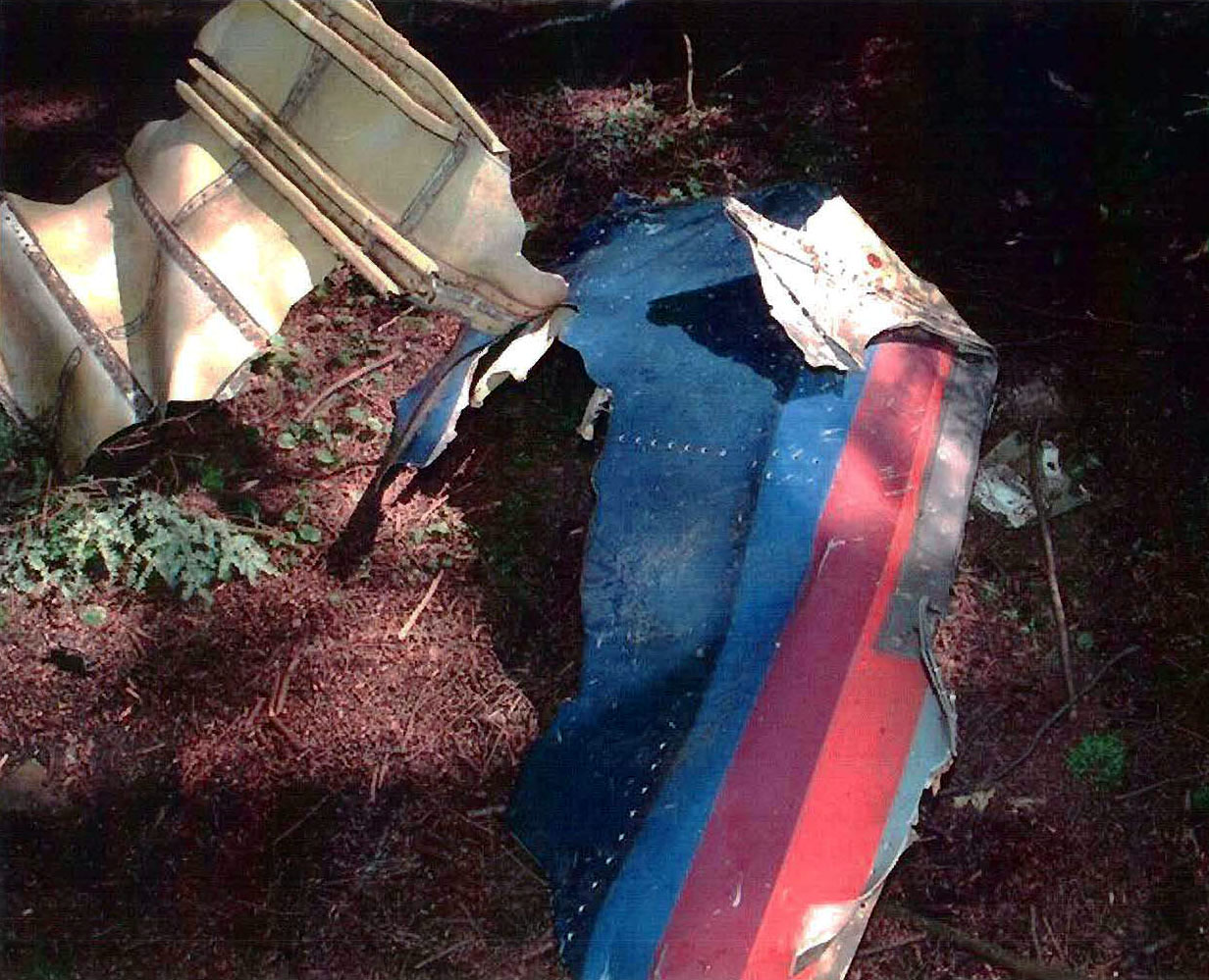
Debris of Flight 93 found at crash site. The United Airlines "Battleship Gray" livery used on the aircraft is visible.

The first responders arrived at the crash site after 10:06. Cleveland Center controllers, unaware the flight had crashed, notified the Northeast Air Defense Sector (NEADS) at 10:07 that Flight 93 had a bomb on board and passed the last known position. This call was the first time the military was notified about the flight. Ballinger sent one final ACARS message to Flight 93 at 10:10, "Don't divert to DC. Not an option." He repeated the message one minute later. The Herndon Command Center alerted FAA headquarters that Flight 93 had crashed at 10:13. NEADS called the Washington Air Route Traffic Control Center for an update on Flight 93 and received notification that the flight had crashed.

At 10:37, CNN correspondent Aaron Brown, covering the collapse of the World Trade Center, announced, "We are getting reports and we are getting lots of reports and we want to be careful to tell you when we have confirmed them and not, but we have a report that a 747 is down in Pennsylvania, and that remains unconfirmed at this point." He followed that up at 10:49 by reporting "We have a report now that a large plane crashed this morning, north of the Somerset County Airport, which is in western Pennsylvania, not too terribly far from Pittsburgh, about 80 miles (130 km) or so, a Boeing 767 jet. Don't know whose airline it was, whose airplane it was, and we don't have any details beyond that which I have just given you." In the confusion, he also erroneously reported a second hijacked plane heading for the Pentagon after the crash of the first.

== Aftermath ==
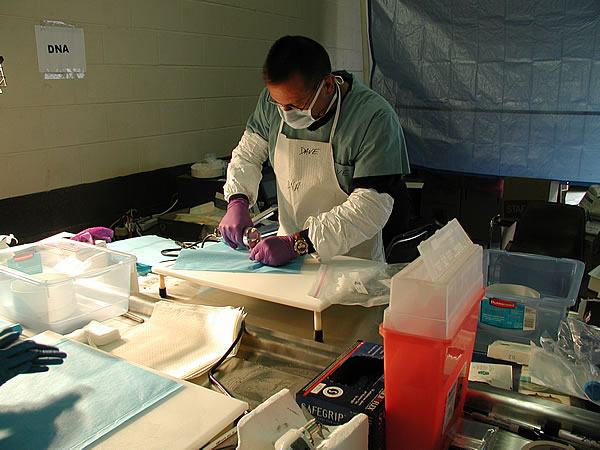
DNA recovery at the crash site

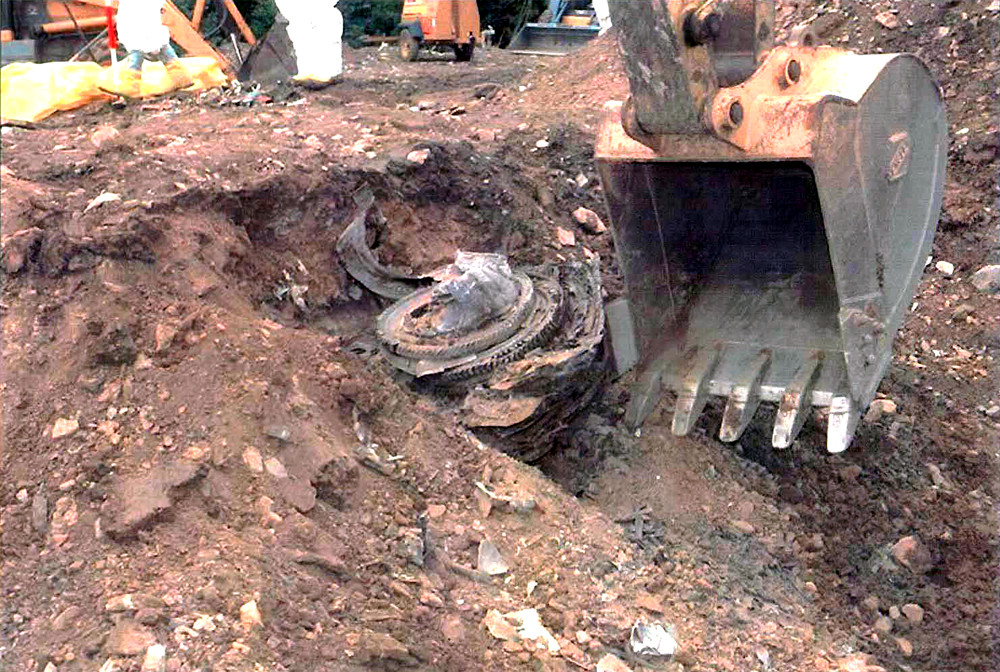
One of United Airlines Flight 93's engines unearthed after the crash

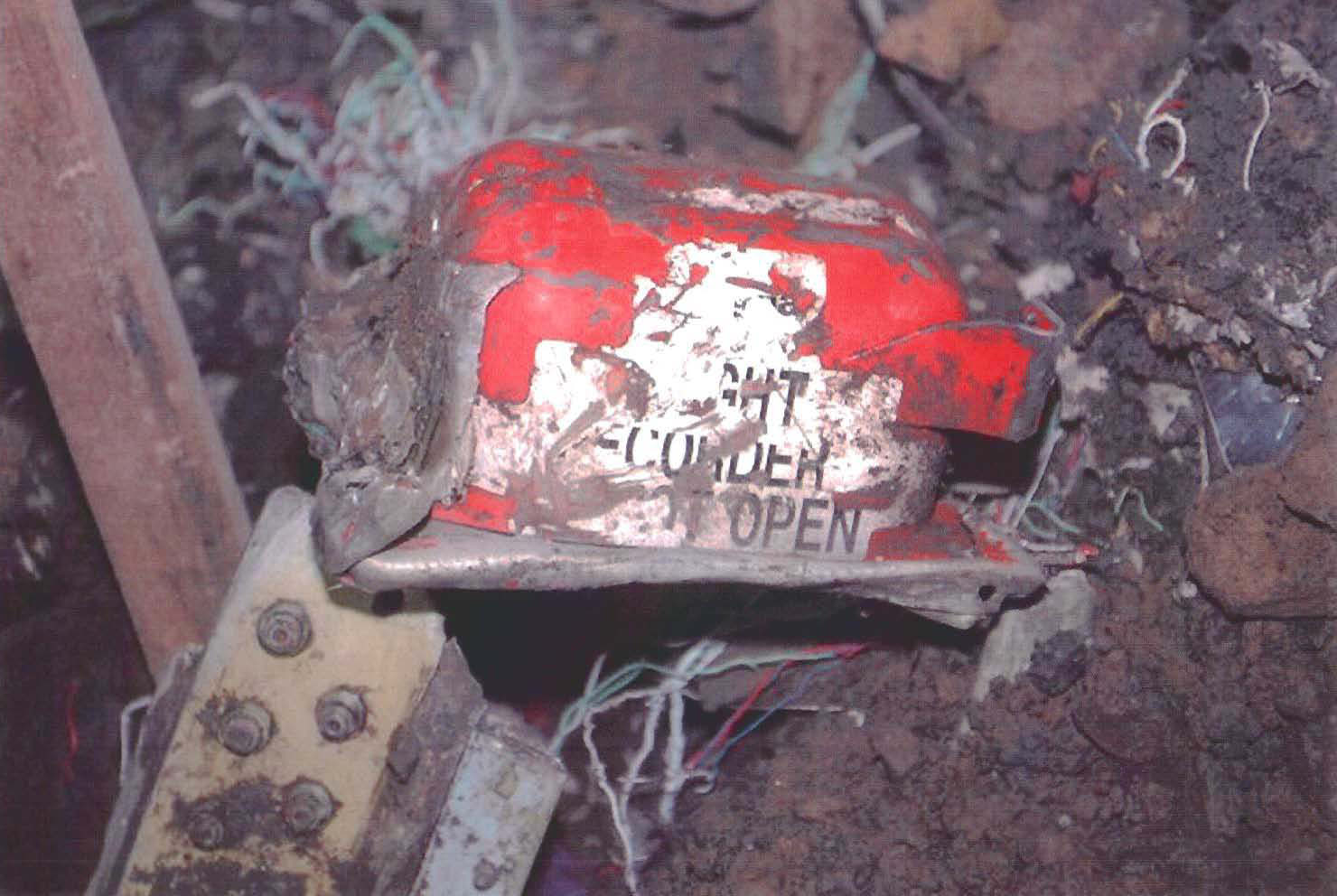
The cockpit voice recorder found at the scene in Somerset County, Pennsylvania, where Flight 93 crashed

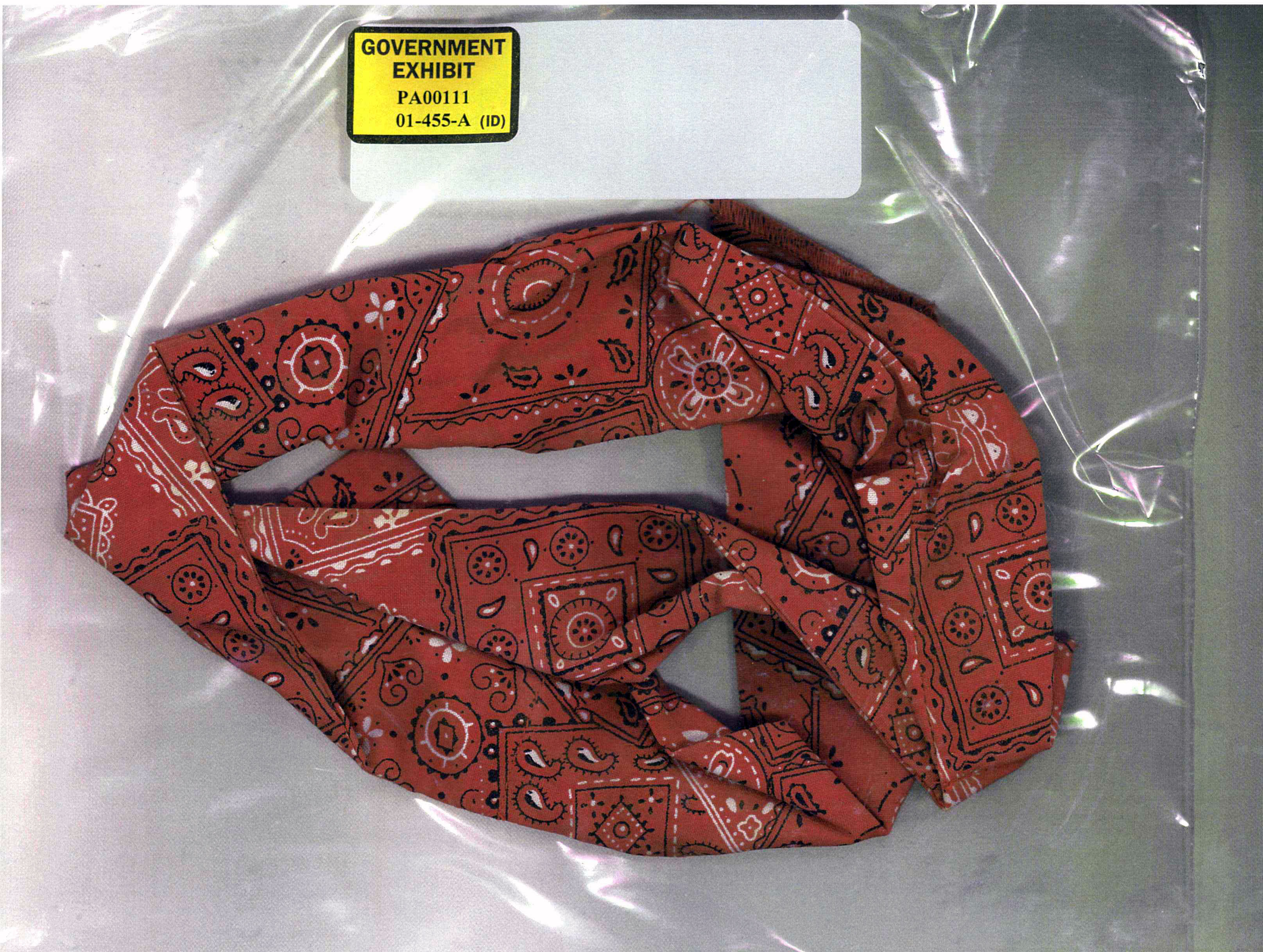
The bandana of one of the hijackers

Flight 93 fragmented violently upon impact. Most of the aircraft wreckage was found near the impact crater. Investigators found very light debris including paper and nylon scattered up to eight miles (13 km) from the impact point in New Baltimore. Other tiny aircraft fragments were found 1.5 miles (2.4 km) away at Indian Lake. All human remains were found within a 70-acre (28 ha) area surrounding the impact point.

Somerset County coroner Wally Miller was involved in the investigation and identification of the remains. In examining the wreckage, the only human body part he could see was part of a backbone. Miller later found and identified 1,500 pieces of human remains totaling about 600 pounds (272 kg), or eight percent of the total. The rest of the remains were consumed by the impact. Investigators identified four victims by September 22 and eleven by September 24. They identified another by September 29. Thirty-four passengers were identified by October 27.

All the people on board the flight were identified by December 21. Human remains were so fragmented that investigators could not determine whether any victims were dead before the plane crashed. Death certificates for the 40 victims listed the cause of death as homicide and listed the cause of death for the four hijackers as suicide. The remains and personal effects of the victims were returned to the families. The remains of Ziad Jarrah were identified and turned over to the Federal Bureau of Investigation (FBI) as evidence after DNA samples submitted by his girlfriend were matched to remains recovered in Shanksville. The remains of the other three hijackers were identified by the process of elimination and turned over to the FBI as evidence.

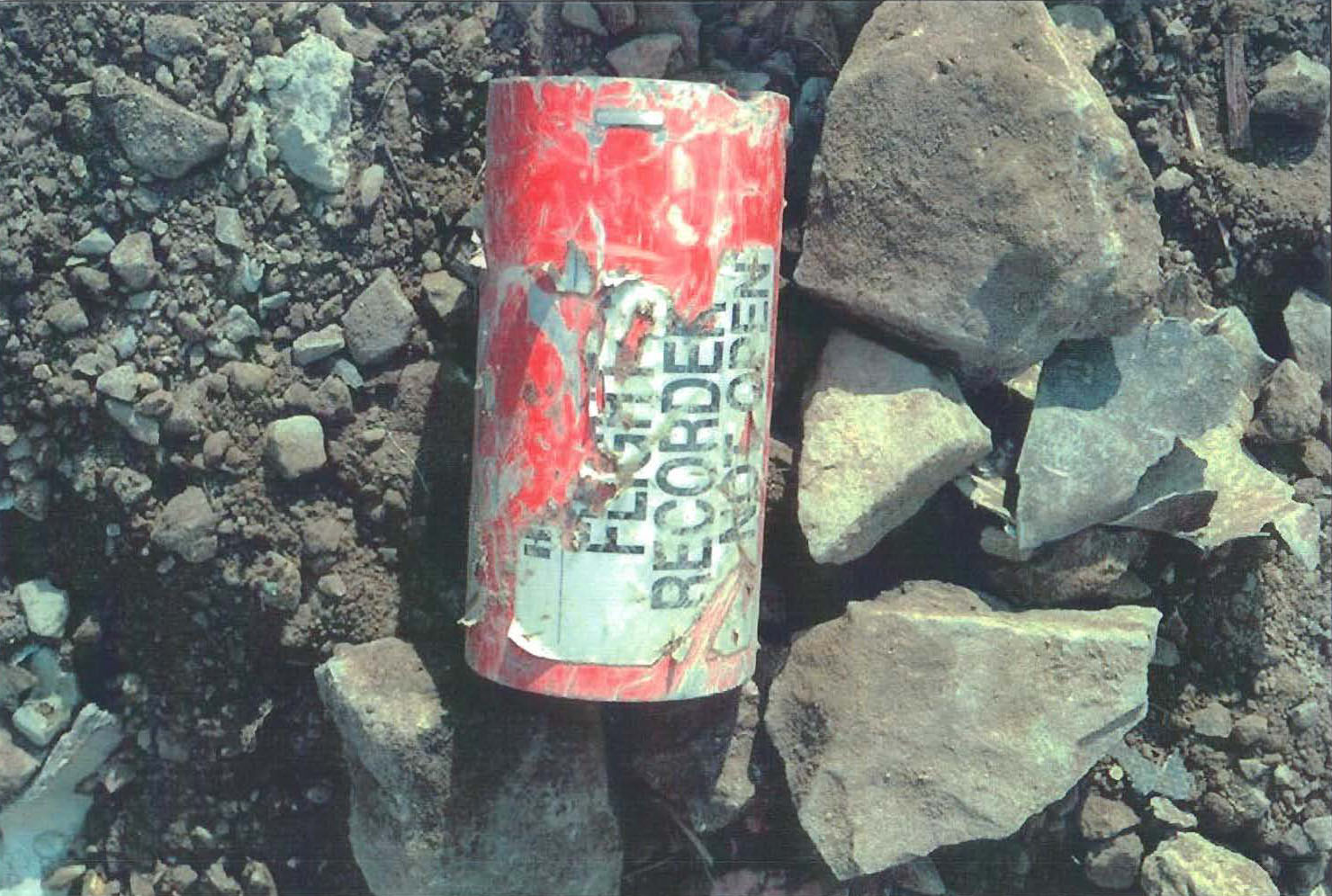
The flight data recorder found at the scene in Somerset County, Pennsylvania, where Flight 93 crashed

Investigators also found a knife concealed in a cigarette lighter. They located the flight data recorder on September 13 and the cockpit voice recorder the following day. The voice recorder was found buried 25 feet (8 m) below the crater. The FBI initially refused to release the voice recording, rejecting requests by Congresswoman Ellen Tauscher and family members of those on board. While access to voice recordings is usually restricted to government crash investigators and plane crash litigants, the FBI made an exception by allowing the relatives of Flight 93 victims to listen to the recording in a closed session on April 18, 2002. Jurors for the Zacarias Moussaoui trial heard the tape as part of the proceedings and the transcript was publicly released on April 12, 2006. As of June 2025, the audio recording had still not been released to the public, due to an "active and ongoing investigation."

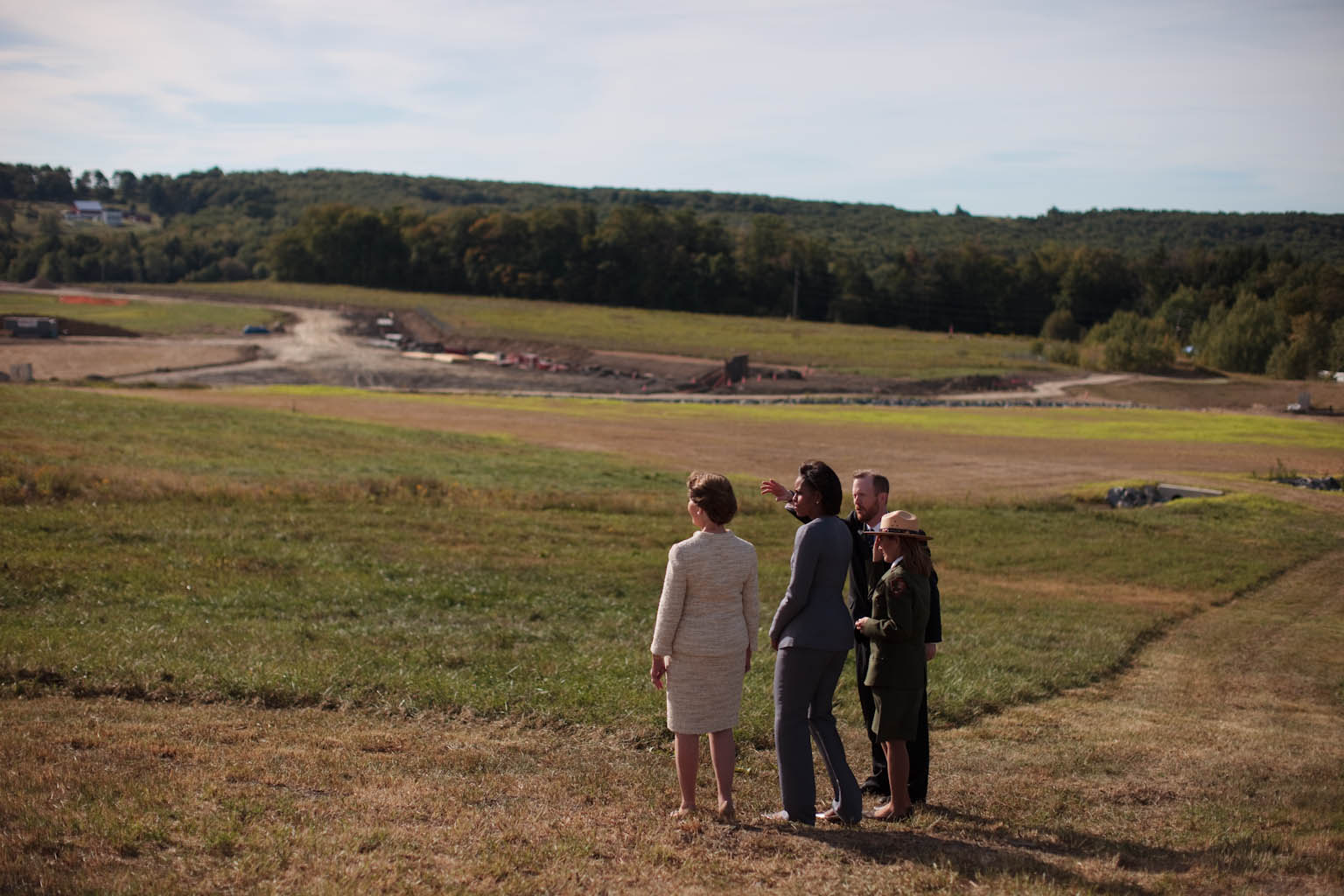
First Ladies Michelle Obama and Laura Bush survey the crash site on September 11, 2010, the ninth anniversary of the hijacking

The passengers (excluding the hijackers) and crew on board Flight 93 were nominated for the Congressional Gold Medal on September 19, 2001. Congressman Bill Shuster introduced a bill to this effect in 2006, and they were granted on September 11, 2014. The obverse of the Medal is inscribed with "A common field one day, a field of honor forever" and "Act of Congress 2011". The reverse of the Medal features 40 stars (in honor of each of the passengers and crew), a sentinel eagle clasping laurel branches, the western front of the U.S. Capitol, and the inscription "We honor the passengers and crew of Flight 93 who perished in a Pennsylvania field on September 11, 2001. Their courageous action will be remembered forever."

Beamer's final words, "let's roll", became a national catchphrase. The Port Authority of New York and New Jersey changed the name of Newark's airport from Newark International Airport to Newark Liberty International Airport and a flag now flies over Terminal A's Gate A17. Flight 93 has been the subject of various films and documentaries including The Flight That Fought Back, Flight 93, and the feature film United 93. A 60-minute documentary titled I Missed Flight 93 aired on the History Channel around early 2006, featuring interviews with Flight 93 regular Frank Robertazzi; painter Daniel Belardinelli whose uncle, William Cashman, died on the flight; and flight surgeon Heather Ogle who was booked in seat 1A next to Jarrah.

United Airlines retired the flight numbers 93 and 175 after the attacks. It was reported in May 2011 that the company was reactivating them as a codeshare operated by Continental Airlines, sparking an outcry from some in the media and the labor union representing United pilots. United said the numbers had been "inadvertently reinstated" and would not be reactivated.

=== Target ===
The intended target of Flight 93 was the United States Capitol. The two setbacks the hijackers faced, totalling 88 minutes combined, meant casualties on the ground would have been minimal even if the plane did reach D.C. The attack on the Pentagon at 09:37 caused the immediate evacuation of all federal government buildings in the area, with the Capitol and the White House being evacuated 28 minutes before Flight 93's earliest projected arrival time of 10:13.

Before the attacks, Khalid Sheikh Mohammed, Osama bin Laden, and Mohammed Atef developed a list of potential targets. Bin Laden wanted to destroy the White House and the Pentagon. Sheikh Mohammed wanted to strike the World Trade Center and all three wanted to hit the Capitol. Atta cautioned bin al-Shibh that the White House proved to be too difficult to reach. Eventually, Atta told bin al-Shibh that Jarrah planned to hit the Capitol.

Atta briefly mentioned the possibility of striking a nuclear facility, but relented after the other attack pilots voiced their opposition. Based on an exchange between Atta and bin al-Shibh two days before the attacks, the White House would be the primary target for the fourth plane and the Capitol the secondary target. If any pilot could not reach his intended target, he was to crash the plane.

Immediately after the attacks, there was speculation that Camp David was the intended target. Based on testimony from captured al-Qaeda member Abu Zubaydah, U.S. officials believed the White House was the intended target. A post-9/11 interview with Khalid Sheikh Mohammed and bin al-Shibh by Al Jazeera reporter Yosri Fouda said Flight 93 was heading for the Capitol. The 9/11 Commission Report cited the actions of the crew and passengers in preventing the destruction of either the White House or the Capitol. According to further testimony by Sheikh Mohammed, bin Laden preferred the Capitol over the White House as a target. Salim Hamdan, bin Laden's driver, told interrogators that he knew that the flight was heading for the Capitol.

=== Fighter jet response ===
Two F-16 fighter pilots from the 121st Fighter Squadron of the D.C. Air National Guard, Marc Sasseville and Heather "Lucky" Penney, were scrambled and ordered to intercept Flight 93. The pilots intended to ram it since they did not have time to arm the jets; armed jets ready to take off was not standard at the time of the attack. They never reached Flight 93 and did not learn of its crash until hours afterwards.

A fighter pilot based at Andrews Air Force Base, Billy Hutchison, claimed that while in the air he spotted Flight 93 on his scope and planned to first fire his training rounds into the engine and cockpit, and then ram the airplane with his own jet. His account was published in Lynn Spencer's book Touching History. John Farmer, Senior Counsel to the 9/11 commission, pointed out that this would have been impossible, as Hutchison's squadron was not in the air until 10:38, thirty-five minutes after Flight 93 had crashed. When the 9/11 Commission asked Hutchison why he gave this false claim, he refused to answer and left the room.

The North American Aerospace Defense Command (NORAD) stated to the 9/11 Commission that fighters would have intercepted Flight 93 before it reached its target in Washington, D.C., but the commission disagreed, saying that "NORAD did not even know the plane was hijacked until after it had crashed" and concluding that had it not crashed it probably would have arrived in Washington by 10:23. The 9/11 Commission Report stated that NEADS fighters pursued Delta Air Lines Flight 1989, a flight thought to be hijacked. The commission found that NORAD and the FAA gave inaccurate testimony.

=== Memorials ===
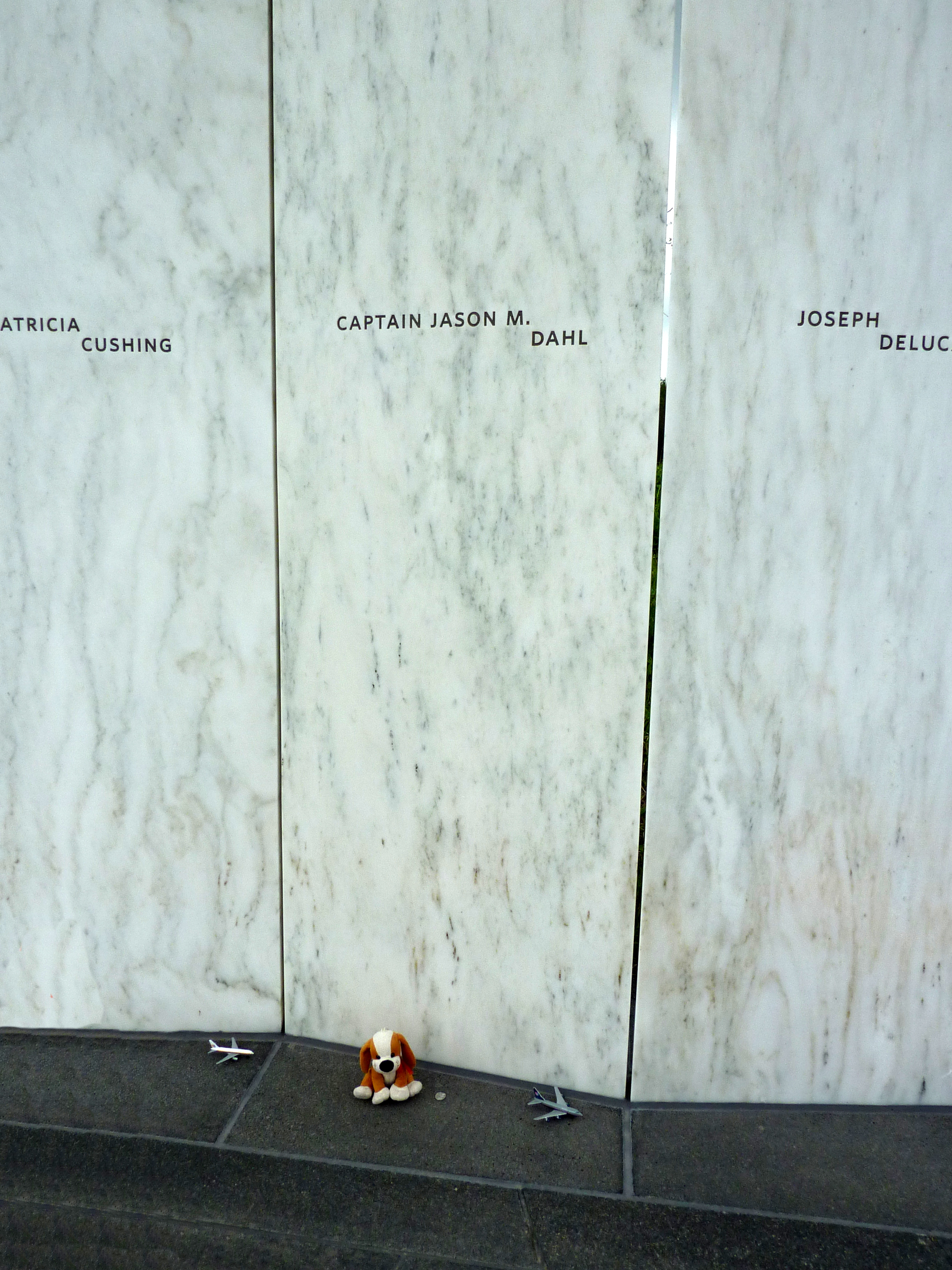
The Flight 93 National Memorial

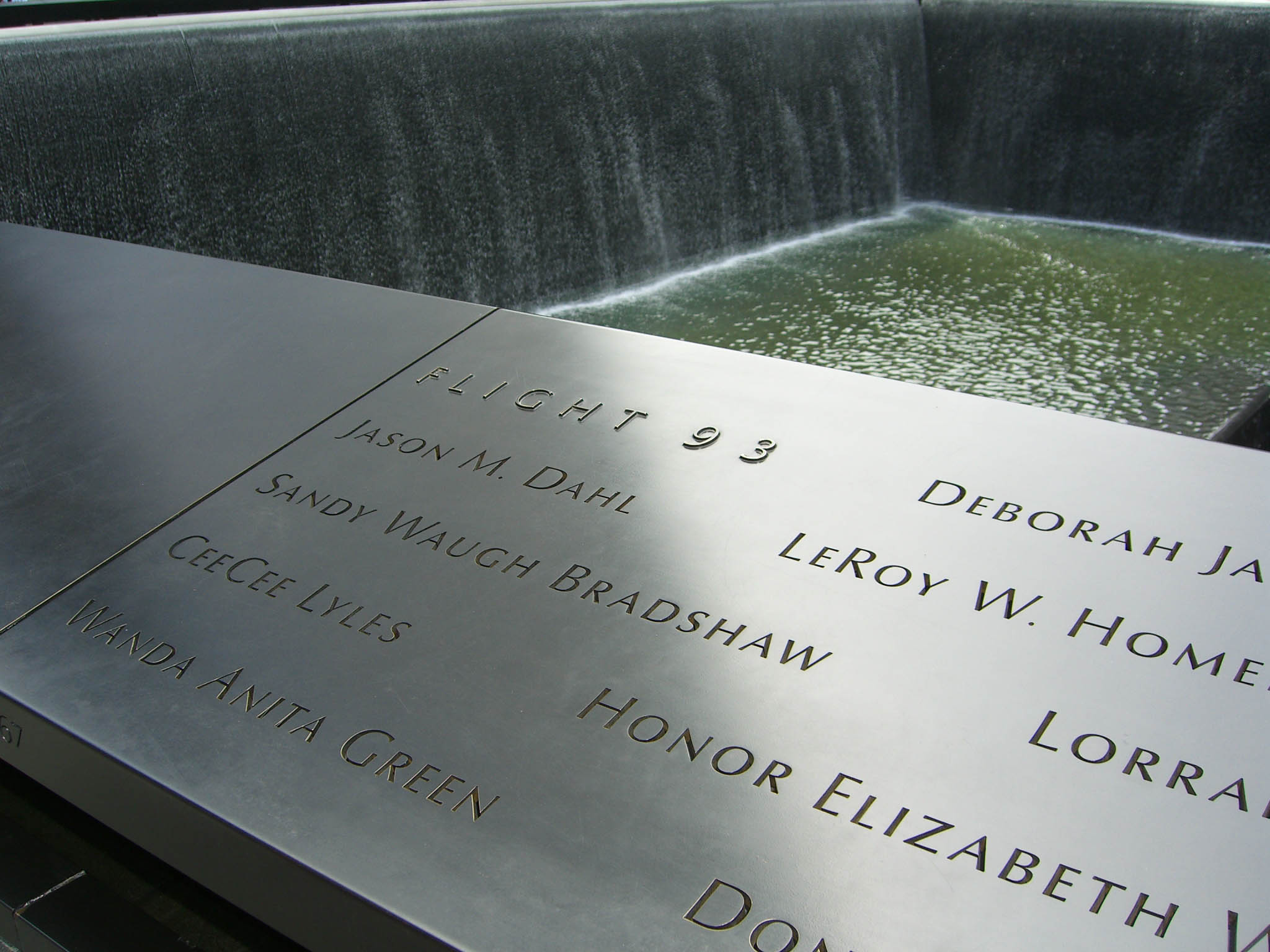
The National September 11 Memorial's South Pool.

A temporary memorial formed from spontaneous tributes left by visitors in the days after the attacks at the crash site. Foundations across the country began to raise money to fund a memorial to the victims within a month of the crash.

Two years after the attacks, federal officials formed the Flight 93 National Memorial Advisory Commission responsible for making design recommendations for a permanent memorial. A national design competition was held to create a public memorial in the Pennsylvania field where Flight 93 crashed. The winning design, "Crescent of Embrace", was selected out of a pool of 1,011 submissions on September 7, 2005. The site plan features a large crescent pathway with red maples and sugar maples planted along the outer arc.

This design ran into opposition over funding, size, and appearance. Republican congressman Charles H. Taylor blocked $10 million in federal funds toward the project as he saw it as "unrealistic". Republican Congressional leaders later persuaded him to acquiesce to political pressure and began approving federal funds. The proposed design has also attracted critics who see Islamic symbolism in the crescent design.

On August 31, 2009, an agreement was announced between the landowners and the National Park Service to allow the purchase of land for $9.5 million. The memorial area with a white marble Wall of Names was dedicated on September 10, 2011, the day before the 10th anniversary of the crash. A concrete and glass visitor center was opened on September 10, 2015, on a hill overlooking the memorial, with both the visitor center and the Wall of Names being aligned with the flight path and the final piece, the "Tower of Voices", was dedicated during a ceremony on September 9, 2018.

CeeCee Lyles was one of the flight attendants on board. In 2003, a statue of Lyles was unveiled in her hometown of Fort Pierce, Florida, which has since gained national recognition as one of the many monuments to the attacks. On August 9, 2007, a portion of U.S. 219 in Somerset County, near the Flight 93 National Memorial, was co-signed as the Flight 93 Memorial Highway. At the National September 11 Memorial, the names of the victims of Flight 93 are inscribed on Panels S-67 and S-68 at the South Pool.

On the sixteenth anniversary of the crash, Vice President Mike Pence spoke at the memorial: "Without regard to personal safety, they [the victims] rushed forward to save [our] lives ... I will always believe that I and many others in our nation's capital were able to go home that day and hug our families because of the courage and sacrifice of the heroes of Flight 93."

On June 21, 2018, the remaining wreckage of Flight 93, which had been stored in shipping containers in a warehouse since the crash, was buried at the crash site in a private ceremony. Prior to the ceremony, the wreckage was hand-searched for personal effects and human remains that might have been missed in prior years.

== Victims ==
The passengers (excluding the hijackers) and crew were from:

Nationality	Passengers	Crew	Total
United States	30	7	37
Germany	1	0	1
Japan	1	0	1
New Zealand	1	0	1
Total	33	7	40

== See also ==
- Flydubai Flight 1073 – 2026 cockpit attack and attempted hijacking
- List of accidents and incidents involving commercial aircraft
- List of aircraft hijackings
- Pan Am Flight 73 – 1986 ground hijacking in Pakistan
