= Online Film Critics Society Award for Best Supporting Actress =

Annual film award

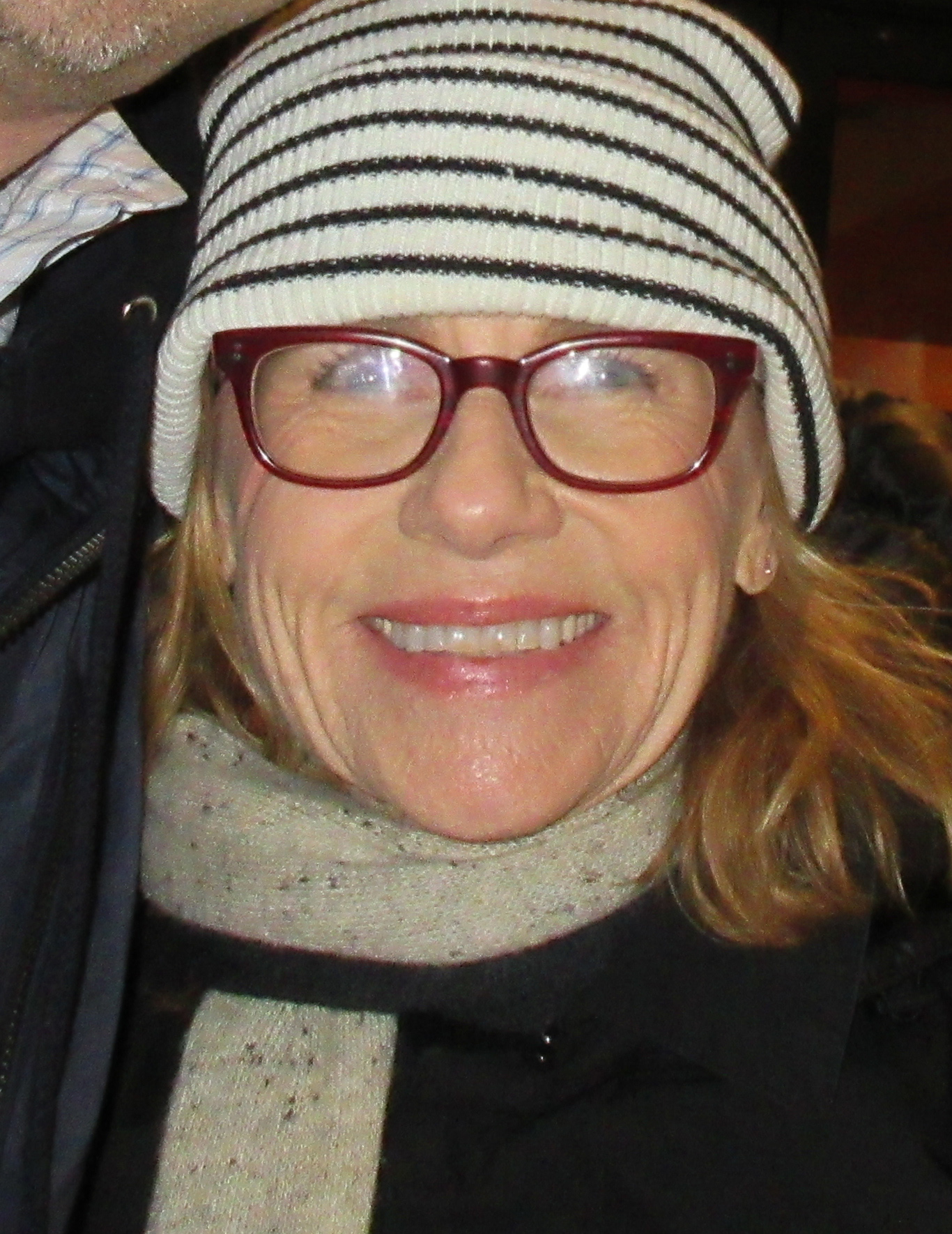
The 2025 recipient: Amy Madigan

The Online Film Critics Society Award for Best Supporting Actress is an annual film award given by the Online Film Critics Society to honor the best supporting actress of the year.

== Winners ==
=== 1990s ===
Year	Winner	Film	Role
1997	Gloria Stuart	Titanic	Rose Calvert
1997	Joan Cusack	Grosse Pointe Blank	Marcella
1997	Julianne Moore	The Myth of Fingerprints	Mia
1998	Joan Allen	Pleasantville	Betty Parker
1998	Kathy Bates	Primary Colors	Libby Holden
1998	Lisa Kudrow	The Opposite of Sex	Lucia De Lury
1999	Catherine Keener	Being John Malkovich	Maxine Lund
1999	Thora Birch	American Beauty	Jane Burnham
1999	Cameron Diaz	Being John Malkovich	Lotte Schwartz
1999	Julianne Moore	Magnolia	Linda Partridge
1999	Chloë Sevigny	Boys Don't Cry	Lana Tisdel

=== 2000s ===
Year	Winner	Film	Role
2000	Kate Hudson	Almost Famous	Penny Lane
2000	Jennifer Connelly	Requiem for a Dream	Marion Silver
2000	Elaine May	Small Time Crooks	May
2000	Frances McDormand	Almost Famous	Elaine Miller
2000	Zhang Ziyi	Crouching Tiger, Hidden Dragon	Jen Yu
2001	Jennifer Connelly	A Beautiful Mind	Alicia Nash
2001	Scarlett Johansson	Ghost World	Rebecca
2001	Helen Mirren	Gosford Park	Mrs. Wilson
2001	Maggie Smith	Gosford Park	Constance, Countess of Trentham
2001	Marisa Tomei	In the Bedroom	Natalie Strout
2002	Samantha Morton	Minority Report	Agatha
2002	Kathy Bates	About Schmidt	Roberta Hertzel
2002	Edie Falco	Sunshine State	Marly Temple
2002	Meryl Streep	Adaptation	Susan Orlean
2002	Catherine Zeta-Jones	Chicago	Velma Kelly
2003	Shohreh Aghdashloo	House of Sand and Fog	Nadereh "Nadi" Behrani
2003	Maria Bello	The Cooler	Natalie Belisario
2003	Patricia Clarkson	Pieces of April	Joy Burns
2003	Holly Hunter	Thirteen	Melanie Freeland
2003	Renée Zellweger	Cold Mountain	Ruby Thewes
2004	Cate Blanchett	The Aviator	Katharine Hepburn
2004	Laura Linney	Kinsey	Clara McMillen
2004	Virginia Madsen	Sideways	Maya Randall
2004	Natalie Portman	Closer	Alice Ayres
2004	Sharon Warren	Ray	Aretha Williams
2005	Maria Bello	A History of Violence	Edie Stall
2005	Amy Adams	Junebug	Ashley Johnsten
2005	Catherine Keener	Capote	Harper Lee
2005	Rachel Weisz	The Constant Gardener	Tessa Quayle
2005	Michelle Williams	Brokeback Mountain	Alma Beers
2006	Abigail Breslin	Little Miss Sunshine	Olive Hoover
2006	Adriana Barraza	Babel	Amelia
2006	Cate Blanchett	Notes on a Scandal	Sheba Hart
2006	Jennifer Hudson	Dreamgirls	Effie White
2006	Rinko Kikuchi	Babel	Chieko Wataya
2007	Amy Ryan	Gone Baby Gone	Helene McCready
2007	Cate Blanchett	I'm Not There	Jude Quinn
2007	Jennifer Garner	Juno	Vanessa Loring
2007	Kelly Macdonald	No Country for Old Men	Carla Jean Moss
2007	Saoirse Ronan	Atonement	Briony Tallis (age 13)
2007	Tilda Swinton	Michael Clayton	Karen Crowder
2008	Marisa Tomei	The Wrestler	Pam/Cassidy
2008	Amy Adams	Doubt	Sister James
2008	Viola Davis	Doubt	Mrs. Miller
2008	Penélope Cruz	Vicky Cristina Barcelona	María Elena
2008	Kate Winslet	The Reader	Hanna Schmitz
2009	Mo'Nique	Precious	Mary
2009	Vera Farmiga	Up in the Air	Alex Goran
2009	Anna Kendrick	Up in the Air	Natalie Keener
2009	Diane Kruger	Inglourious Basterds	Bridget von Hammersmark
2009	Julianne Moore	A Single Man	Charley

=== 2010s ===
Year	Winner	Film	Role
2010	Hailee Steinfeld	True Grit	Mattie Ross
2010	Amy Adams	The Fighter	Charlene Fleming
2010	Mila Kunis	Black Swan	Lily / The Black Swan
2010	Melissa Leo	The Fighter	Alice Eklund
2010	Jacki Weaver	Animal Kingdom	Janine 'Smurf' Cody
2011	Jessica Chastain	The Tree of Life	Mrs. O'Brien
2011	Melissa McCarthy	Bridesmaids	Megan Price
2011	Janet McTeer	Albert Nobbs	Hubert Page
2011	Carey Mulligan	Shame	Sissy Sullivan
2011	Shailene Woodley	The Descendants	Alexandra King
2012	Anne Hathaway	Les Misérables	Fantine
2012	Amy Adams	The Master	Peggy Dodd
2012	Ann Dowd	Compliance	Sandra
2012	Sally Field	Lincoln	Mary Todd Lincoln
2012	Helen Hunt	The Sessions	Cheryl Cohen-Greene
2013	Lupita Nyong'o	12 Years a Slave	Patsey
2013	Sally Hawkins	Blue Jasmine	Ginger
2013	Scarlett Johansson	Her	Samantha (voice)
2013	Jennifer Lawrence	American Hustle	Rosalyn Rosenfeld
2013	Léa Seydoux	Blue is the Warmest Color	Emma
2014	Patricia Arquette	Boyhood	Olivia Evans
2014	Jessica Chastain	A Most Violent Year	Anna Morales
2014	Suzanne Clément	Mommy	Kyla
2014	Agata Kulesza	Ida	Wanda Gruz
2014	Tilda Swinton	Snowpiercer	Minister Mason
2015	Rooney Mara	Carol	Therese Belivet
2015	Cynthia Nixon	James White	Gail White
2015	Kristen Stewart	Clouds of Sils Maria	Valentine
2015	Alicia Vikander	The Danish Girl	Gerda Wegener
2015	Kate Winslet	Steve Jobs	Joanna Hoffman
2016	Naomie Harris	Moonlight	Paula
2016	Viola Davis	Fences	Rose Maxson
2016	Lily Gladstone	Certain Women	Jamie
2016	Octavia Spencer	Hidden Figures	Dorothy Vaughan
2016	Michelle Williams	Manchester by the Sea	Randi Chandler
2017	Laurie Metcalf	Lady Bird	Marion McPherson
2017	Mary J. Blige	Mudbound	Florence Jackson
2017	Tiffany Haddish	Girls Trip	Dina
2017	Holly Hunter	The Big Sick	Beth Gardner
2017	Allison Janney	I, Tonya	LaVona Golden
2018	Regina King	If Beale Street Could Talk	Sharon Rivers
2018	Elizabeth Debicki	Widows	Alice
2018	Thomasin McKenzie	Leave No Trace	Tom
2018	Emma Stone	The Favourite	Abigail Masham
2018	Rachel Weisz	The Favourite	Sarah Churchill
2019	Jennifer Lopez	Hustlers	Ramona Vega
2019	Laura Dern	Marriage Story	Nora Fanshaw
2019	Florence Pugh	Little Women	Amy March
2019	Margot Robbie	Once Upon a Time in Hollywood	Sharon Tate
2019	Zhao Shuzhen	The Farewell	Nai Nai

=== 2020s ===
Year	Winner	Film	Role
2020	Maria Bakalova	Borat Subsequent Moviefilm	Tutar Sagdiyev
2020	Olivia Colman	The Father	Anne
2020	Talia Ryder	Never Rarely Sometimes Always	Skyler
2020	Amanda Seyfried	Mank	Marion Davies
2020	Youn Yuh-jung	Minari	Soonja
2021	Kirsten Dunst	The Power of the Dog	Rose Gordon
2021	Ariana DeBose	West Side Story	Anita
2021	Ann Dowd	Mass	Linda
2021	Aunjanue Ellis	King Richard	Oracene Price
2021	Ruth Negga	Passing	Clare Bellew
2022	Kerry Condon	The Banshees of Inisherin	Siobhán Súilleabháin
2022	Angela Bassett	Black Panther: Wakanda Forever	Queen Ramonda
2022	Dolly De Leon	Triangle of Sadness	Abigail
2022	Jamie Lee Curtis	Everything Everywhere All At Once	Deirdre Beaubeirdre
2022	Stephanie Hsu	Everything Everywhere All At Once	Joy Wang / Jobu Tupaki
2023	Da'Vine Joy Randolph	The Holdovers	Mary Lamb
2023	Emily Blunt	Oppenheimer	Katherine Oppenheimer
2023	Danielle Brooks	The Color Purple	Sofia
2023	Rachel McAdams	Are You There God? It's Me, Margaret.	Barbara Simon
2023	Julianne Moore	May December	Gracie
2024	Margaret Qualley	The Substance	Sue
2024	Aunjanue Ellis-Taylor	Nickel Boys	Hattie
2024	Ariana Grande	Wicked	Galinda "Glinda" Upland
2024	Isabella Rossellini	Conclave	Sister Agnes
2024	Zoe Saldaña	Emilia Pérez	Rita Mora Castro
2025	Amy Madigan	Weapons	Gladys
2025	Elle Fanning	Sentimental Value	Rachel Kemp
2025	Inga Ibsdotter Lilleaas	Sentimental Value	Agnes Borg Pettersen
2025	Wunmi Mosaku	Sinners	Annie
2025	Teyana Taylor	One Battle After Another	Perfidia Beverly Hills
