= Online Film Critics Society Award for Best Foreign Language Film =

Annual film award

The Online Film Critics Society Award for Best Foreign Language Film (Best Film Not in the English Language) is an annual film award given by the Online Film Critics Society to honor the best foreign language film of the year.

== Winners and nominees ==
=== 1990s ===
Year	English title	Original title	Country	Director
1997	Shall We Dance?	Shall We Dansu?	Japan	Masayuki Suo
1997	Ponette		France	Jacques Doillon
1997	La Promesse		Belgium	Jean-Pierre Dardenne and Luc Dardenne
1998	Life Is Beautiful	La vita è bella	Italy	Roberto Benigni
1998	The Celebration	Festen	Denmark	Thomas Vinterberg
1998	Central Station	Central do Brasil	Brazil	Walter Salles
1999	Run Lola Run	Lola rennt	Germany	Tom Tykwer
1999	All About My Mother	Todo sobre mi madre	Spain	Pedro Almodóvar
1999	The Dreamlife of Angels	La Vie rêvée des anges	France	Erick Zonca
1999	The Red Violin	Le Violon Rouge	Canada	François Girard
1999	Xiu Xiu: The Sent Down Girl	天浴 (Tiān Yù)	China	Joan Chen

=== 2000s ===
Year	English title	Original title	Country	Director
2000	Crouching Tiger, Hidden Dragon	Wo hu cang long	China	Ang Lee
2000	The Color of Paradise	رنگ خدا, Rang-e Khodā	Iran	Majid Majidi
2000	Girl on the Bridge	La fille sur le pont	France	Patrice Leconte
2000	Shower	洗澡, Xǐ zǎo	China	Zhang Yang
2000	Yi Yi	Yī Yī	Taiwan	Edward Yang
2001	Amélie	Le fabuleux destin d'Amélie Poulain	France/Germany	Jean-Pierre Jeunet
2001	Fat Girl	À ma sœur!	France	Catherine Breillat
2001	In the Mood for Love	花樣年華	Hong Kong	Wong Kar-wai
2001	No Man’s Land	Ničija zemlja, Ничија земља	Bosnia and Herzegovina	Danis Tanović
2001	With a Friend Like Harry…	Harry, un ami qui vous veut du bien	France	Dominik Moll
2002	And Your Mother Too	Y Tu Mamá También	Mexico	Alfonso Cuarón
2002	Atanarjuat: The Fast Runner	ᐊᑕᓈᕐᔪᐊᑦ	Canada	Zacharias Kunuk
2002	Monsoon Wedding		India	Mira Nair
2002	Spirited Away	千と千尋の神隠し, Sen to Chihiro no Kamikakushi	Japan	Hayao Miyazaki
2002	Talk to Her	Hable Con Ella	Spain	Pedro Almodóvar
2003	City of God	Cidade de Deus	Brazil	Fernando Meirelles
2003	The Barbarian Invasions	Les Invasions barbares	Canada/France	Denys Arcand
2003	Irreversible	Irréversible	France	Gaspar Noé
2003	The Man Without a Past	Mies vailla menneisyyttä	Finland	Aki Kaurismäki
2003	The Triplets of Belleville	Les Triplettes de Belleville	France/Belgium	Sylvain Chomet
2004	Hero	Ying xiong	China/Hong Kong	Zhang Yimou
2004	House of Flying Daggers	十面埋伏, Shímiàn máifú	China/Hong Kong	Zhang Yimou
2004	Maria Full of Grace	María, llena eres de gracia	Colombia	Joshua Marston
2004	The Motorcycle Diaries	Diarios de motocicleta	Argentina/Brazil	Walter Salles
2004	A Very Long Engagement	Un long dimanche de fiançailles	France	Jean-Pierre Jeunet
2005	Downfall	Der Untergang	Germany	Oliver Hirschbiegel
2005	2046		Hong Kong	Wong Kar-wai
2005	Caché		France/Austria	Michael Haneke
2005	Kung Fu Hustle	功夫	Hong Kong/China	Stephen Chow
2005	Oldboy	올드보이, Oldeuboi	South Korea	Park Chan-wook
2006	Pan's Labyrinth	El laberinto del fauno	Mexico	Guillermo del Toro
2006	The Death of Mr. Lazarescu	Moartea domnului Lăzărescu	Romania	Cristi Puiu
2006	L’Enfant		Belgium	Dardenne brothers
2006	Volver		Spain	Pedro Almodóvar
2006	Water	जल, Jal	Canada/USA/India	Deepa Mehta
2007	The Diving Bell and the Butterfly	Le scaphandre et le papillon	France/USA	Julian Schnabel
2007	The Host	괴물, Goemul	South Korea/Japan	Bong Joon-ho
2007	The Lives of Others	Das Leben der Anderen	Germany	Florian Henckel von Donnersmarck
2007	The Orphanage	El orfanato	Spain/Mexico	J. A. Bayona
2007	La Vie en Rose	La Môme	France	Olivier Dahan
2008	Let the Right One In	Låt den rätte komma in	Sweden	Tomas Alfredson
2008	A Christmas Tale	Un conte de Noël	France	Arnaud Desplechin
2008	The Counterfeiters	Die Fälscher	Austria/Germany	Stefan Ruzowitzky
2008	I’ve Loved You So Long	Il y a longtemps que je t'aime	France/Germany	Philippe Claudel
2008	Waltz with Bashir	ואלס עם באשיר, Vals Im Bashir	Israel	Ari Folman
2009	The White Ribbon	Das weiße Band, Eine deutsche Kindergeschichte	Germany	Michael Haneke
2009	Broken Embraces	Los abrazos rotos	Spain	Pedro Almodóvar
2009	Police, Adjective	Polițist, Adjectiv	Romania	Corneliu Porumboiu
2009	Silent Light	Stellet Licht	Mexico/France	Carlos Reygadas
2009	Summer Hours	L'Heure d'été	France	Olivier Assayas

=== 2010s ===
Year	English title	Original title	Country	Director
2010	Mother	Madeo	South Korea	Bong Joon-ho
2010	Carlos		France/Germany	Olivier Assayas
2010	Dogtooth	Κυνόδοντας, Kynothontas	Greece	Yorgos Lanthimos
2010	The Girl with the Dragon Tattoo	Män som hatar kvinnor	Sweden/Denmark	Niels Arden Oplev
2010	A Prophet	Un prophète	France	Jacques Audiard
2011	A Separation	Jodái-e Náder az Simin	Iran	Asghar Farhadi
2011	13 Assassins	十三人の刺客, Jūsannin no Shikaku	United Kingdom/Japan	Takashi Miike
2011	Certified Copy	Copie conforme	France/Italy	Abbas Kiarostami
2011	The Skin I Live In	La piel que habito	Spain	Pedro Almodóvar
2011	Uncle Boonmee Who Can Recall His Past Lives	ลุงบุญมีระลึกชาติ, Lung Bunmi Raluek Chat	Thailand	Apichatpong Weerasethakul
2012	Holy Motors		France/Germany	Leos Carax
2012	Amour		France/Austria	Michael Haneke
2012	Rust and Bone	De rouille et d'os	France/Belgium	Jacques Audiard
2012	This Is Not a Film	این فیلم نیست	Iran	Jafar Panahi and Mojtaba Mirtahmasb
2012	The Turin Horse	A torinói ló	Hungary	Béla Tarr and Ágnes Hranitzky
2013	Blue Is the Warmest Colour	La vie d'Adèle	France	Abdellatif Kechiche
2013	Drug War	毒战	Hong Kong	Johnnie To
2013	Museum Hours		Austria	Jem Cohen
2013	Wadjda	وجدة	Saudi Arabia	Haifaa al-Mansour
2013	The Wind Rises	風立ちぬ, Kaze Tachinu	Japan	Hayao Miyazaki
2014	Two Days, One Night	Deux jours, une nuit	Belgium	Luc Dardenne and Jean-Pierre Dardenne
2014	Ida		Poland	Paweł Pawlikowski
2014	The Missing Picture	L'Image manquante	Cambodia/France	Rithy Panh
2014	Mommy		Canada	Xavier Dolan
2014	The Tale of the Princess Kaguya	かぐや姫の物語, Kaguya-hime no Monogatari	Japan	Isao Takahata
2015	The Assassin	Nie yin niang	Taiwan	Hou Hsiao-hsien
2015	Goodnight Mommy	Ich seh, Ich seh	Austria	Veronika Franz
2015	Mustang		France	Deniz Gamze Ergüven
2015	Phoenix		Germany	Christian Petzold
2015	Son of Saul	Saul fia	Hungary	László Nemes
2016	The Handmaiden	Agassi	South Korea	Park Chan-wook
2016	Elle		France	Paul Verhoeven
2016	Neruda		Chile	Pablo Larraín
2016	The Salesman	فروشنده, Forušande	Iran	Asghar Farhadi
2016	Toni Erdmann		Germany	Maren Ade
2017	BPM (Beats per Minute)	120 battements par minute	France	Robin Campillo
2017	Nocturama		France/Belgium	Bertrand Bonello
2017	Raw	Grave	France/Belgium	Julia Ducournau
2017	Thelma		Norway/Sweden	Joachim Trier
2017	The Square		Sweden/Germany	Ruben Östlund
2018	Roma		Mexico	Alfonso Cuarón
2018	Burning	버닝, Beoning	South Korea/Japan	Lee Chang-dong
2018	Cold War	Zimna wojna	Poland/France	Paweł Pawlikowski
2018	Shoplifters	万引き家族, Manbiki Kazoku	Japan	Hirokazu Kore-eda
2018	Zama		Argentina/Spain	Lucrecia Martel
2019	Parasite	Gisaengchung	South Korea	Bong Joon-ho
2019	Atlantics	Atlantique	France/Senegal	Mati Diop
2019	Monos		Colombia/Argentina	Alejandro Landes
2019	Pain and Glory	Dolor y gloria	Spain	Pedro Almodóvar
2019	Portrait of a Lady on Fire	Portrait de la jeune fille en feu	France	Céline Sciamma

=== 2020s ===
Year	English title	Original title	Country	Director
2020	Minari		United States	Lee Isaac Chung
2020	Another Round	Druk	Denmark	Thomas Vinterberg
2020	Bacurau		Brazil	Kleber Mendonça Filho and Juliano Dornelles
2020	Collective	Colectiv	Romania	Alexander Nanau
2020	La Llorona		Guatemala	Jayro Bustamante
2021	Drive My Car	ドライブ・マイ・カー (Doraibu Mai Kā)	Japan	Ryusuke Hamaguchi
2021	Flee	Flugt	Denmark	Jonas Poher Rasmussen
2021	A Hero	قهرمان, Qahremaan	Iran	Asghar Farhadi
2021	Titane		France	Julia Ducournau
2021	The Worst Person in the World	Verdens verste menneske	Norway	Joachim Trier
2022	Decision to Leave	헤어질 결심, Heeojil gyeolsim	South Korea	Park Chan-wook
2022	All Quiet on the Western Front	Im Westen nichts Neues	Germany	Edward Berger
2022	EO	Io	Poland	Jerzy Skolimowski
2022	No Bears	خرس نیست, Khers Nist	Iran	Jafar Panahi
2022	RRR		India	S. S. Rajamouli
2023	Anatomy of a Fall	Anatomie d'une chute	France	Justine Triet
2023	Fallen Leaves	Kuolleet lehdet	Finland	Aki Kaurismäki
2023	Godzilla Minus One	ゴジラ マイナスワン, Gojira Mainasu Wan	Japan	Takashi Yamazaki
2023	Perfect Days		Japan	Wim Wenders
2023	The Zone of Interest		United Kingdom/Poland	Jonathan Glazer
2024	All We Imagine as Light		France/India	Payal Kapadia
2024	Emilia Pérez		France	Jacques Audiard
2024	Flow	Straume	Latvia	Gints Zilbalodis
2024	I’m Still Here	Ainda Estou Aqui	Brazil	Walter Salles
2024	The Seed of the Sacred Fig	دانه‌ی انجیر معابد,Dāne-ye anjīr-e ma'ābed	Germany/Iran	Mohammad Rasoulof
