= Online Film Critics Society Award for Best Actress =

Annual film award

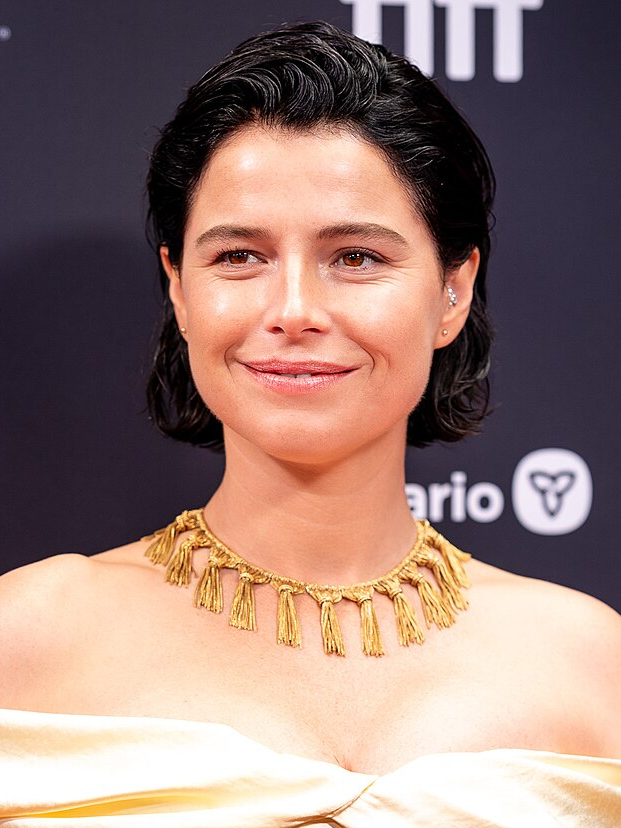
The 2025 recipient: Jessie Buckley

The Online Film Critics Society Award for Best Actress is an annual film award given by the Online Film Critics Society to honor the best lead actress of the year.

Natalie Portman, Naomi Watts and Reese Witherspoon have each won this award twice. Cate Blanchett has been awarded three times.

== Winners ==
=== 1990s ===
Year	Winner	Film	Role
1997	Judi Dench	Mrs Brown	Queen Victoria
1997	Helena Bonham Carter	The Wings of the Dove	Kate Croy
1997	Kate Winslet	Titanic	Rose DeWitt Bukater
1998	Cate Blanchett	Elizabeth	Queen Elizabeth I
1998	Gwyneth Paltrow	Shakespeare in Love	Viola de Lesseps
1998	Emily Watson	Hilary and Jackie	Jacqueline du Pré
1999	Reese Witherspoon	Election	Tracy Flick
1999	Annette Bening	American Beauty	Carolyn Burnham
1999	Heather Donahue	The Blair Witch Project	Heather Donahue
1999	Janet McTeer	Tumbleweeds	Mary Jo Walker
1999	Hilary Swank	Boys Don't Cry	Brandon Teena

=== 2000s ===
Year	Winner	Film	Role
2000	Ellen Burstyn	Requiem for a Dream	Sara Goldfarb
2000	Joan Allen	The Contender	Sen. Laine Billings Hanson
2000	Björk	Dancer in the Dark	Selma Ježková
2000	Laura Linney	You Can Count on Me	Samantha 'Sammy' Prescott
2000	Julia Roberts	Erin Brockovich	Erin Brockovich
2001	Naomi Watts	Mulholland Drive	Betty Elms / Diane Selwyn
2001	Thora Birch	Ghost World	Enid
2001	Nicole Kidman	The Others	Grace Stewart
2001	Sissy Spacek	In the Bedroom	Ruth Fowler
2001	Tilda Swinton	The Deep End	Margaret Hall
2002	Julianne Moore	Far from Heaven	Cathy Whitaker
2002	Jennifer Aniston	The Good Girl	Justine Last
2002	Maggie Gyllenhaal	Secretary	Lee Holloway
2002	Isabelle Huppert	The Piano Teacher	Erika Kohut
2002	Diane Lane	Unfaithful	Connie Sumner
2003	Naomi Watts	21 Grams	Cristina Peck
2003	Angela Bettis	May	May Dove Canady
2003	Scarlett Johansson	Lost in Translation	Charlotte
2003	Charlize Theron	Monster	Aileen Wuornos
2003	Uma Thurman	Kill Bill: Volume 1	The Bride/Black Mamba
2004	Kate Winslet	Eternal Sunshine of the Spotless Mind	Clementine Kruczynski
2004	Julie Delpy	Before Sunset	Celine
2004	Imelda Staunton	Vera Drake	Vera Drake
2004	Hilary Swank	Million Dollar Baby	Maggie Fitzgerald
2004	Uma Thurman	Kill Bill: Volume 2	Beatrix Kiddo/The Bride/Black Mamba
2005	Reese Witherspoon	Walk the Line	June Carter Cash
2005	Joan Allen	The Upside of Anger	Terry Wolfmeyer
2005	Felicity Huffman	Transamerica	Bree Osbourne
2005	Keira Knightley	Pride & Prejudice	Elizabeth Bennet
2005	Naomi Watts	King Kong	Ann Darrow
2006	Helen Mirren	The Queen	Queen Elizabeth II
2006	Penélope Cruz	Volver	Raimunda
2006	Judi Dench	Notes on a Scandal	Barbara Covett
2006	Meryl Streep	The Devil Wears Prada	Miranda Priestly
2006	Kate Winslet	Little Children	Sarah Pierce
2007	Julie Christie	Away from Her	Fiona Anderson
2007	Marion Cotillard	La Vie en rose	Édith Piaf
2007	Angelina Jolie	A Mighty Heart	Mariane Pearl
2007	Laura Linney	The Savages	Wendy Savage
2007	Elliot Page (Note: Credited as Ellen Page)	Juno	Juno MacGuff
2008	Michelle Williams	Wendy and Lucy	Wendy Carroll
2008	Anne Hathaway	Rachel Getting Married	Kym Buchanan
2008	Sally Hawkins	Happy-Go-Lucky	Poppy Cross
2008	Meryl Streep	Doubt	Sister Aloysius Beauvier
2008	Kate Winslet	Revolutionary Road	April Wheeler
2009	Mélanie Laurent	Inglourious Basterds	Shoshanna Dreyfus
2009	Carey Mulligan	An Education	Jenny Miller
2009	Gabourey Sidibe	Precious	Claireece "Precious" Jones
2009	Meryl Streep	Julie & Julia	Julia Child
2009	Tilda Swinton	Julia	Julia

=== 2010s ===
Year	Winner	Film	Role
2010	Natalie Portman	Black Swan	Nina Sayers
2010	Annette Bening	The Kids Are All Right	Dr. Nicole "Nic" Allgood
2010	Nicole Kidman	Rabbit Hole	Becca Corbett
2010	Kim Hye-ja	Mother	Mother
2010	Jennifer Lawrence	Winter's Bone	Ree Dolly
2011	Tilda Swinton	We Need to Talk About Kevin	Eva Khatchadourian
2011	Kirsten Dunst	Melancholia	Justine
2011	Elizabeth Olsen	Martha Marcy May Marlene	Martha
2011	Meryl Streep	The Iron Lady	Margaret Thatcher
2011	Michelle Williams	My Week with Marilyn	Marilyn Monroe
2012	Jessica Chastain	Zero Dark Thirty	Maya
2012	Jennifer Lawrence	Silver Linings Playbook	Tiffany Maxwell
2012	Emmanuelle Riva	Amour	Anne Laurent
2012	Quvenzhané Wallis	Beasts of the Southern Wild	Hushpuppy
2012	Rachel Weisz	The Deep Blue Sea	Hester Collyer
2013	Cate Blanchett	Blue Jasmine	Jeanette "Jasmine" Francis
2013	Amy Adams	American Hustle	Sydney Prosser / Lady Edith Greensly
2013	Julie Delpy	Before Midnight	Céline Wallace
2013	Adèle Exarchopoulos	Blue Is the Warmest Colour	Adèle
2013	Brie Larson	Short Term 12	Grace
2014	Rosamund Pike	Gone Girl	Amy Elliott-Dunne
2014	Marion Cotillard	Two Days, One Night	Sandra Bya
2014	Essie Davis	The Babadook	Amelia
2014	Anne Dorval	Mommy	Diane Després
2014	Julianne Moore	Still Alice	Dr. Alice Howland
2015	Cate Blanchett	Carol	Carol Aird
2015	Brie Larson	Room	Joy "Ma" Newsome
2015	Charlotte Rampling	45 Years	Kate Mercer
2015	Saoirse Ronan	Brooklyn	Eilis Lacey
2015	Charlize Theron	Mad Max: Fury Road	Imperator Furiosa
2016	Natalie Portman	Jackie	Jackie Kennedy
2016	Amy Adams	Arrival	Dr. Louise Banks
2016	Isabelle Huppert	Elle	Michèle Leblanc
2016	Ruth Negga	Loving	Mildred Loving
2016	Emma Stone	La La Land	Mia Dolan
2017	Sally Hawkins	The Shape of Water	Elisa Esposito
2017	Frances McDormand	Three Billboards Outside Ebbing, Missouri	Mildred Hayes
2017	Cynthia Nixon	A Quiet Passion	Emily Dickinson
2017	Margot Robbie	I, Tonya	Tonya Harding
2017	Saoirse Ronan	Lady Bird	Christine "Lady Bird" McPherson
2018	Toni Collette	Hereditary	Annie Graham
2018	Yalitza Aparicio	Roma	Cleodegaria "Cleo" Gutiérrez
2018	Olivia Colman	The Favourite	Anne, Queen of Great Britain
2018	Regina Hall	Support the Girls	Lisa Conroy
2018	Lady Gaga	A Star is Born	Ally Maine
2019	Lupita Nyong'o	Us	Adelaide Wilson / Red
2019	Awkwafina	The Farewell	Billi Wang
2019	Scarlett Johansson	Marriage Story	Nicole Barber
2019	Florence Pugh	Midsommar	Dani Ardor
2019	Renée Zellweger	Judy	Judy Garland

=== 2020s ===
Year	Winner	Film	Role
2020	Frances McDormand	Nomadland	Fern
2020	Jessie Buckley	I'm Thinking of Ending Things	Young Woman
2020	Viola Davis	Ma Rainey's Black Bottom	Ma Rainey
2020	Sidney Flanigan	Never Rarely Sometimes Always	Autumn Callahan
2020	Carey Mulligan	Promising Young Woman	Cassandra "Cassie" Thomas
2021	Olivia Colman	The Lost Daughter	Leda Caruso
2021	Alana Haim	Licorice Pizza	Alana Kane
2021	Renate Reinsve	The Worst Person in the World	Julie
2021	Agathe Rousselle	Titane	Alexia/Adrien
2021	Kristen Stewart	Spencer	Diana, Princess of Wales
2022	Michelle Yeoh	Everything Everywhere All At Once	Evelyn Quan Wang
2022	Cate Blanchett	Tár	Lydia Tár
2022	Viola Davis	The Woman King	General Nanisca
2022	Danielle Deadwyler	Till	Mamie Till-Mobley
2022	Mia Goth	Pearl	Pearl
2023	Lily Gladstone	Killers of the Flower Moon	Mollie Kyle
2023	Sandra Hüller	Anatomy of a Fall	Sandra Voyter
2023	Greta Lee	Past Lives	Nora Moon
2023	Margot Robbie	Barbie	Barbie
2023	Emma Stone	Poor Things	Bella Baxter
2024	Mikey Madison	Anora	Anora "Ani" Mikheeva
2024	Cynthia Erivo	Wicked	Elphaba Thropp
2024	Marianne Jean-Baptiste	Hard Truths	Pansey Deacon
2024	Demi Moore	The Substance	Elisabeth Sparkle
2024	Fernanda Torres	I'm Still Here	Eunice Paiva
2025	Jessie Buckley	Hamnet	Agnes Shakespeare
2025	Rose Byrne	If I Had Legs I'd Kick You	Linda
2025	Renate Reinsve	Sentimental Value	Nora Borg
2025	Amanda Seyfried	The Testament of Ann Lee	Ann Lee
2025	Emma Stone	Bugonia	Michelle Fuller
