= Online Film Critics Society Award for Best Documentary Film =

Annual film award

The Online Film Critics Society Award for Best Documentary Film is an annual film award given by the Online Film Critics Society to honor the best documentary of the year.

== Winners ==
=== 1990s ===
Year	Film
1997	4 Little Girls
1997	Fast, Cheap & Out of Control
1997	Sick: The Life & Death of Bob Flanagan, Supermasochist
1998	The Big One
1998	The Cruise
1998	Wild Man Blues
1999	Buena Vista Social Club
1999	42 Up
1999	American Movie
1999	Mr. Death: The Rise and Fall of Fred A. Leuchter, Jr.
1999	Trekkies

=== 2000s ===
Year	Film
2000	The Filth and the Fury
2000	Dark Days
2000	The Eyes of Tammy Faye
2000	The Life and Times of Hank Greenberg
2000	One Day in September
2001	Startup.com
2001	Down from the Mountain
2001	In the Bedroom
2001	The Endurance
2001	The Gleaners and I
2001	Keep the River on Your Right: A Modern Cannibal Tale
2002	Bowling for Columbine
2002	Comedian
2002	Dogtown and Z-Boys
2002	The Kid Stays in the Picture
2002	Standing in the Shadows of Motown
2003	Capturing the Friedmans
2003	The Fog of War
2003	Lost in La Mancha
2003	Spellbound
2003	Winged Migration
2004	Fahrenheit 9/11
2004	Control Room
2004	Metallica: Some Kind of Monster
2004	Super Size Me
2004	Touching the Void
2005	Grizzly Man
2005	The Aristocrats
2005	Enron: The Smartest Guys in the Room
2005	March of the Penguins
2005	Murderball
2006	An Inconvenient Truth
2006	Dave Chappelle’s Block Party
2006	Jesus Camp
2006	Neil Young: Heart of Gold
2006	Shut Up & Sing
2007	The King of Kong: A Fistful of Quarters
2007	In the Shadow of the Moon
2007	Into Great Silence
2007	No End in Sight
2007	Sicko
2008	Man on Wire
2008	Dear Zachary: A Letter to a Son About His Father
2008	Encounters at the End of the World
2008	I.O.U.S.A.
2008	My Winnipeg
2009	Anvil! The Story of Anvil
2009	The Beaches of Agnès
2009	Capitalism: A Love Story
2009	The Cove
2009	Food, Inc.

=== 2010s ===
Year	Film
2010	Exit Through the Gift Shop
2010	Catfish
2010	Inside Job
2010	Joan Rivers: A Piece of Work
2010	Restrepo
2010	Waiting for “Superman”
2011	Cave of Forgotten Dreams
2011	The Interrupters
2011	Into the Abyss
2011	Project Nim
2011	Tabloid
2012	This Is Not a Film
2012	The Imposter
2012	The Invisible War
2012	Jiro Dreams of Sushi
2012	The Queen of Versailles
2013	The Act of Killing
2013	56 Up
2013	At Berkeley
2013	Blackfish
2013	Stories We Tell
2014	Life Itself
2014	Citizenfour
2014	The Missing Picture
2014	National Gallery
2014	The Overnighters
2015	The Look of Silence
2015	Amy
2015	Best of Enemies
2015	Cartel Land
2015	Going Clear: Scientology and the Prison of Belief
2016	O.J.: Made in America
2016	13th
2016	Cameraperson
2016	I Am Not Your Negro
2016	Weiner
2017	Faces Places
2017	Dawson City: Frozen Time
2017	Ex Libris: The New York Public Library
2017	Jane
2017	The Work
2018	Won’t You Be My Neighbor?
2018	Free Solo
2018	Minding the Gap
2018	Shirkers
2018	Three Identical Strangers
2019	Apollo 11
2019	American Factory
2019	For Sama
2019	Honeyland
2019	One Child Nation

=== 2020s ===
Year	Film
2020	Dick Johnson Is Dead
2020	Boys State
2020	Collective
2020	The Painter and the Thief
2020	Time
2021	Summer of Soul (…Or, When the Revolution Could Not Be Televised)
2021	Flee
2021	Procession
2021	The Rescue
2021	The Velvet Underground
2022	Fire of Love
2022	All That Breathes
2022	All the Beauty and the Bloodshed
2022	Good Night Oppy
2022	Moonage Daydream
2023	20 Days in Mariupol
2023	American Symphony
2023	Beyond Utopia
2023	Kokomo City
2023	Still: A Michael J. Fox Movie
2024	Dahomey
2024	Daughters
2024	Soundtrack to a Coup d’Etat
2024	Sugarcane
2024	Will & Harper
