= Online Film Critics Society Award for Best Actor =

Annual film award

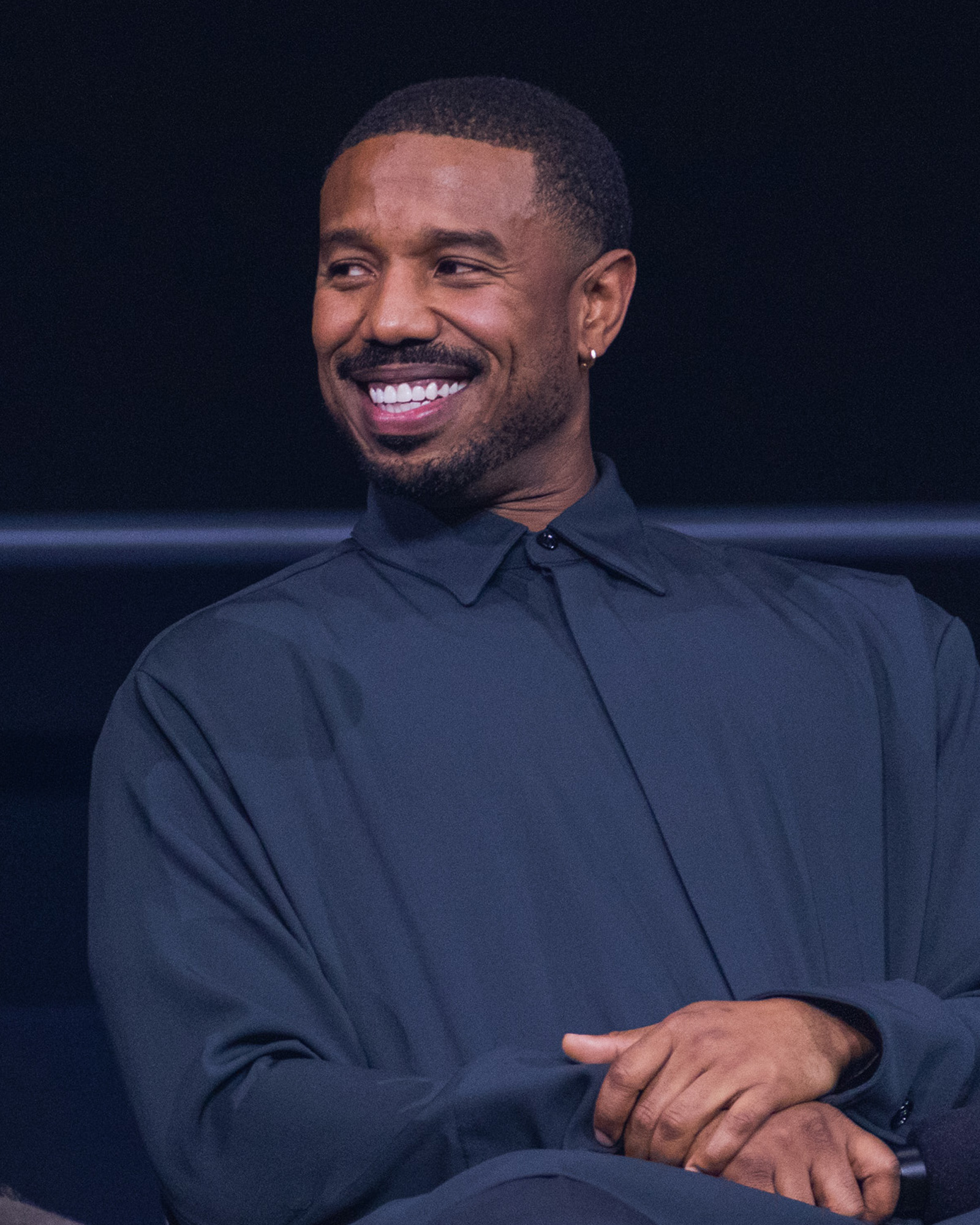
The 2025 recipient: Michael B. Jordan

The Online Film Critics Society Award for Best Actor is an annual film award given by the Online Film Critics Society to honor the best lead actor of the year.

== Winners ==
=== 1990s ===
Year	Winner	Film	Role
1997	Jack Nicholson	As Good as It Gets	Melvin Udall
1997	Peter Fonda	Ulee's Gold	Ulysses "Ulee" Jackson
1997	Ian Holm	The Sweet Hereafter	Mitchell Stephens
1998	Ian McKellen	Gods and Monsters	James Whale
1998	Tom Hanks	Saving Private Ryan	Captain John H. Miller
1998	Edward Norton	American History X	Derek Vinyard
1999	Kevin Spacey	American Beauty	Lester Burnham
1999	Jim Carrey	Man on the Moon	Andy Kaufman
1999	Russell Crowe	The Insider	Jeffrey Wigand
1999	Richard Farnsworth	The Straight Story	Alvin Straight
1999	Edward Norton	Fight Club	The Narrator

=== 2000s ===
Year	Winner	Film	Role
2000	Tom Hanks	Cast Away	Chuck Noland
2000	Christian Bale	American Psycho	Patrick Bateman
2000	Russell Crowe	Gladiator	Maximus Decimus Meridius
2000	Michael Douglas	Wonder Boys	Prof. Grady Tripp
2000	Geoffrey Rush	Quills	Marquis de Sade
2001	Billy Bob Thornton	The Man Who Wasn't There	Ed Crane
2001	Russell Crowe	A Beautiful Mind	John Nash
2001	Guy Pearce	Memento	Leonard Shelby
2001	Denzel Washington	Training Day	Alonzo Harris
2001	Tom Wilkinson	In the Bedroom	Matt Fowler
2002	Daniel Day-Lewis	Gangs of New York	William "Bill the Butcher" Cutting
2002	Adrien Brody	The Pianist	Władysław Szpilman
2002	Nicolas Cage	Adaptation	Charlie Kaufman / Donald Kaufman
2002	Jack Nicholson	About Schmidt	Warren R. Schmidt
2002	Robin Williams	One Hour Photo	Seymour "Sy" Parrish
2003	Bill Murray	Lost in Translation	Bob Harris
2003	Johnny Depp	Pirates of the Caribbean: The Curse of the Black Pearl	Captain Jack Sparrow
2003	Paul Giamatti	American Splendor	Harvey Pekar
2003	Ben Kingsley	House of Sand and Fog	Massoud Behrani
2003	Sean Penn	Mystic River	Jimmy Markum
2004	Paul Giamatti	Sideways	Miles Raymond
2004	Jim Carrey	Eternal Sunshine of the Spotless Mind	Joel Barish
2004	Don Cheadle	Hotel Rwanda	Paul Rusesabagina
2004	Leonardo DiCaprio	The Aviator	Howard Hughes
2004	Jamie Foxx	Ray	Ray Charles
2005	Philip Seymour Hoffman	Capote	Truman Capote
2005	Terrence Howard	Hustle & Flow	DJay
2005	Heath Ledger	Brokeback Mountain	Ennis del Mar
2005	Joaquin Phoenix	Walk the Line	Johnny Cash
2005	David Strathairn	Good Night, and Good Luck	Edward R. Murrow
2006	Forest Whitaker	The Last King of Scotland	Idi Amin
2006	Sacha Baron Cohen	Borat	Borat Sagdiyev
2006	Leonardo DiCaprio	The Departed	Billy Costigan
2006	Ryan Gosling	Half Nelson	Dan Dunne
2006	Peter O'Toole	Venus	Maurice
2007	Daniel Day-Lewis	There Will Be Blood	Daniel Plainview
2007	George Clooney	Michael Clayton	Michael Clayton
2007	Emile Hirsch	Into the Wild	Christopher McCandless
2007	Frank Langella	Starting Out in the Evening	Leonard Schiller
2007	Viggo Mortensen	Eastern Promises	Nikolai Luzhin
2008	Mickey Rourke	The Wrestler	Randy Robinson
2008	Benicio del Toro	Che	Che Guevara
2008	Richard Jenkins	The Visitor	Walter Vale
2008	Frank Langella	Frost/Nixon	Richard Nixon
2008	Sean Penn	Milk	Harvey Milk
2009	Jeremy Renner	The Hurt Locker	SFC. William James
2009	Jeff Bridges	Crazy Heart	Otis "Bad" Blake
2009	George Clooney	Up in the Air	Ryan Bingham
2009	Sharlto Copley	District 9	Wikus van de Merwe
2009	Joaquin Phoenix	Two Lovers	Leonard Kraditor

=== 2010s ===
Year	Winner	Film	Role
2010	Colin Firth	The King's Speech	King George VI
2010	Jeff Bridges	True Grit	Rooster Cogburn
2010	Jesse Eisenberg	The Social Network	Mark Zuckerberg
2010	James Franco	127 Hours	Aron Ralston
2010	Ryan Gosling	Blue Valentine	Dean Pereira
2010	Édgar Ramírez	Carlos	Carlos the Jackal
2011	Michael Fassbender	Shame	Brandon Sullivan
2011	George Clooney	The Descendants	Matt King
2011	Jean Dujardin	The Artist	George Valentin
2011	Gary Oldman	Tinker Tailor Soldier Spy	George Smiley
2011	Michael Shannon	Take Shelter	Curtis LaForche
2012	Daniel Day-Lewis	Lincoln	Abraham Lincoln
2012	John Hawkes	The Sessions	Mark O'Brien
2012	Denis Lavant	Holy Motors	Mr. Oscar / Various Characters
2012	Joaquin Phoenix	The Master	Freddie Quell
2012	Denzel Washington	Flight	William "Whip" Whitaker, Sr.
2013	Chiwetel Ejiofor	12 Years a Slave	Solomon Northup
2013	Tom Hanks	Captain Phillips	Captain Richard Phillips
2013	Oscar Isaac	Inside Llewyn Davis	Llewyn Davis
2013	Mads Mikkelsen	The Hunt	Lucas
2013	Joaquin Phoenix	Her	Theodore Twombly
2014	Michael Keaton	Birdman	Riggan Thomson
2014	Ralph Fiennes	The Grand Budapest Hotel	Monsieur Gustave H.
2014	Brendan Gleeson	Calvary	Father James Lavelle
2014	Jake Gyllenhaal	Nightcrawler	Louis "Lou" Bloom
2014	Timothy Spall	Mr. Turner	J. M. W. Turner
2015	Michael Fassbender	Steve Jobs	Steve Jobs
2015	Matt Damon	The Martian	Mark Watney
2015	Leonardo DiCaprio	The Revenant	Hugh Glass
2015	Michael B. Jordan	Creed	Adonis Creed
2015	Ian McKellen	Mr. Holmes	Sherlock Holmes
2016	Casey Affleck	Manchester by the Sea	Lee Chandler
2016	Adam Driver	Paterson	Paterson
2016	Ryan Gosling	La La Land	Sebastian Wilder
2016	Viggo Mortensen	Captain Fantastic	Ben Cash
2016	Denzel Washington	Fences	Troy Maxson
2017	Gary Oldman	Darkest Hour	Winston Churchill
2017	Timothée Chalamet	Call Me by Your Name	Elio Perlman
2017	James Franco	The Disaster Artist	Tommy Wiseau
2017	Daniel Kaluuya	Get Out	Chris Washington
2017	Robert Pattinson	Good Time	Constantine "Connie" Nikas
2018	Ethan Hawke	First Reformed	Ernst Toller
2018	Christian Bale	Vice	Dick Cheney
2018	Bradley Cooper	A Star Is Born	Jackson Maine
2018	Joaquin Phoenix	You Were Never Really Here	Joe
2018	John David Washington	BlacKkKlansman	Ron Stallworth
2019	Adam Driver	Marriage Story	Charlie Barber
2019	Antonio Banderas	Pain and Glory	Salvador Mallo
2019	Robert De Niro	The Irishman	Frank Sheeran
2019	Joaquin Phoenix	Joker	Arthur Fleck / Joker
2019	Adam Sandler	Uncut Gems	Howard Ratner

=== 2020s ===
Year	Winner	Film	Role
2020	Delroy Lindo	Da 5 Bloods	Paul
2020	Riz Ahmed	Sound of Metal	Ruben Stone
2020	Chadwick Boseman	Ma Rainey's Black Bottom	Levee Green
2020	Anthony Hopkins	The Father	Anthony
2020	Steven Yeun	Minari	Jacob Yi
2021	Benedict Cumberbatch	The Power of the Dog	Phil Burbank
2021	Nicolas Cage	Pig	Robbie "Rob" Feld
2021	Andrew Garfield	tick, tick... Boom!	Jonathan Larsen
2021	Oscar Isaac	The Card Counter	William Tell
2021	Hidetoshi Nishijima	Drive My Car	Yūsuke Kafuku
2022	Colin Farrell	The Banshees of Inisherin	Pádraic Súilleabháin
2022	Austin Butler	Elvis	Elvis Presley
2022	Brendan Fraser	The Whale	Charlie
2022	Paul Mescal	Aftersun	Calum Paterson
2022	Bill Nighy	Living	Mr. Williams
2023	Paul Giamatti	The Holdovers	Paul Hunham
2023	Leonardo DiCaprio	Killers of the Flower Moon	Ernest Burkhart
2023	Cillian Murphy	Oppenheimer	J. Robert Oppenheimer
2023	Andrew Scott	All of Us Strangers	Adam
2023	Jeffrey Wright	American Fiction	Thelonious "Monk" Ellison
2024	Ralph Fiennes	Conclave	Cardinal Thomas Lawrence
2024	Adrien Brody	The Brutalist	László Tóth
2024	Timothée Chalamet	A Complete Unknown	Bob Dylan
2024	Colman Domingo	Sing Sing	John "Divine G" Whitfield
2024	Sebastian Stan	A Different Man	Edward Lemuel / "Guy Moratz"
2025	Michael B. Jordan	Sinners	Elijah "Smoke" Moore / Elias "Stack" Moore
2025	Timothée Chalamet	Marty Supreme	Marty Mauser
2025	Leonardo DiCaprio	One Battle After Another	Bob Ferguson
2025	Ethan Hawke	Blue Moon	Lorenz Hart
2025	Wagner Moura	The Secret Agent	Marcelo Alves / Armando Solimões / Fernando Solimões
