= Online Film Critics Society Award for Best Director =

Annual film award

The Online Film Critics Society Award for Best Director is an annual film award given by the Online Film Critics Society to honor the best director of the year.

== Winners ==
=== 1990s ===
Year	Winner	Film
1997	James Cameron	Titanic
1997	Paul Thomas Anderson	Boogie Nights
1997	Curtis Hanson	L.A. Confidential
1998	Steven Spielberg	Saving Private Ryan
1998	Terrence Malick	The Thin Red Line
1998	Peter Weir	The Truman Show
1999	Sam Mendes	American Beauty
1999	David Fincher	Fight Club
1999	Spike Jonze	Being John Malkovich
1999	Stanley Kubrick	Eyes Wide Shut
1999	Michael Mann	The Insider

=== 2000s ===
Year	Winner	Film
2000	Darren Aronofsky	Requiem for a Dream
2000	Cameron Crowe	Almost Famous
2000	Ang Lee	Crouching Tiger, Hidden Dragon
2000	Steven Soderbergh	Traffic
2000	Lars von Trier	Dancer in the Dark
2001	David Lynch	Mulholland Drive
2001	Joel Coen	The Man Who Wasn't There
2001	Todd Field	In the Bedroom
2001	Peter Jackson	The Lord of the Rings: The Fellowship of the Ring
2001	Baz Luhrmann	Moulin Rouge!
2001	Christopher Nolan	Memento
2002	Peter Jackson	The Lord of the Rings: The Two Towers
2002	Todd Haynes	Far from Heaven
2002	Spike Jonze	Adaptation.
2002	Martin Scorsese	Gangs of New York
2002	Steven Spielberg	Minority Report
2003	Peter Jackson	The Lord of the Rings: The Return of the King
2003	Sofia Coppola	Lost in Translation
2003	Clint Eastwood	Mystic River
2003	Alejandro González Iñárritu	21 Grams
2003	Quentin Tarantino	Kill Bill: Volume 1
2004	Michel Gondry	Eternal Sunshine of the Spotless Mind
2004	Clint Eastwood	Million Dollar Baby
2004	Alexander Payne	Sideways
2004	Martin Scorsese	The Aviator
2004	Zhang Yimou	Hero
2005	David Cronenberg	A History of Violence
2005	George Clooney	Good Night, and Good Luck.
2005	Peter Jackson	King Kong
2005	Ang Lee	Brokeback Mountain
2005	Steven Spielberg	Munich
2006	Martin Scorsese	The Departed
2006	Alfonso Cuarón	Children of Men
2006	Guillermo del Toro	Pan's Labyrinth
2006	Alejandro González Iñárritu	Babel
2006	Paul Greengrass	United 93
2007	Joel Coen and Ethan Coen	No Country for Old Men
2007	Paul Thomas Anderson	There Will Be Blood
2007	David Cronenberg	Eastern Promises
2007	David Fincher	Zodiac
2007	Julian Schnabel	The Diving Bell and the Butterfly
2008	Christopher Nolan	The Dark Knight
2008	Darren Aronofsky	The Wrestler
2008	Danny Boyle	Slumdog Millionaire
2008	David Fincher	The Curious Case of Benjamin Button
2008	Andrew Stanton	WALL-E
2009	Kathryn Bigelow	The Hurt Locker
2009	Neill Blomkamp	District 9
2009	James Cameron	Avatar
2009	Joel Coen and Ethan Coen	A Serious Man
2009	Quentin Tarantino	Inglourious Basterds

=== 2010s ===
Year	Winner	Film
2010	David Fincher	The Social Network
2010	Darren Aronofsky	Black Swan
2010	Danny Boyle	127 Hours
2010	Joel Coen and Ethan Coen	True Grit
2010	Christopher Nolan	Inception
2011	Terrence Malick	The Tree of Life
2011	Michel Hazanavicius	The Artist
2011	Martin Scorsese	Hugo
2011	Lars von Trier	Melancholia
2011	Nicolas Winding Refn	Drive
2012	Paul Thomas Anderson	The Master
2012	Ben Affleck	Argo
2012	Wes Anderson	Moonrise Kingdom
2012	Kathryn Bigelow	Zero Dark Thirty
2012	Leos Carax	Holy Motors
2013	Alfonso Cuarón	Gravity
2013	Joel Coen and Ethan Coen	Inside Llewyn Davis
2013	Spike Jonze	Her
2013	Steve McQueen	12 Years a Slave
2013	Hayao Miyazaki	The Wind Rises
2014	Richard Linklater	Boyhood
2014	Wes Anderson	The Grand Budapest Hotel
2014	Jean-Pierre Dardenne and Luc Dardenne	Two Days, One Night
2014	Ava DuVernay	Selma
2014	Jonathan Glazer	Under the Skin
2015	George Miller	Mad Max: Fury Road
2015	Todd Haynes	Carol
2015	Tom McCarthy	Spotlight
2015	Ridley Scott	The Martian
2015	Denis Villeneuve	Sicario
2016	Barry Jenkins	Moonlight
2016	Damien Chazelle	La La Land
2016	Pablo Larraín	Jackie
2016	Kenneth Lonergan	Manchester by the Sea
2016	Denis Villeneuve	Arrival
2017	Christopher Nolan	Dunkirk
2017	Paul Thomas Anderson	Phantom Thread
2017	Guillermo del Toro	The Shape of Water
2017	Greta Gerwig	Lady Bird
2017	Jordan Peele	Get Out
2018	Alfonso Cuarón	Roma
2018	Barry Jenkins	If Beale Street Could Talk
2018	Yorgos Lanthimos	The Favourite
2018	Spike Lee	BlacKkKlansman
2018	Lynne Ramsay	You Were Never Really Here
2019	Bong Joon-ho	Parasite
2019	Sam Mendes	1917
2019	Céline Sciamma	Portrait of a Lady on Fire
2019	Martin Scorsese	The Irishman
2019	Quentin Tarantino	Once Upon a Time in Hollywood

=== 2020s ===
Year	Winner	Film
2020	Chloé Zhao	Nomadland
2020	Emerald Fennell	Promising Young Woman
2020	Eliza Hittman	Never Rarely Sometimes Always
2020	Spike Lee	Da 5 Bloods
2020	Kelly Reichardt	First Cow
2021	Jane Campion	The Power of the Dog
2021	Paul Thomas Anderson	Licorice Pizza
2021	Ryusuke Hamaguchi	Drive My Car
2021	Steven Spielberg	West Side Story
2021	Denis Villeneuve	Dune
2022	Daniel Kwan and Daniel Scheinert	Everything Everywhere All at Once
2022	Todd Field	Tár
2022	Martin McDonagh	The Banshees of Inisherin
2022	Steven Spielberg	The Fabelmans
2022	Charlotte Wells	Aftersun
2023	Christopher Nolan	Oppenheimer
2023	Greta Gerwig	Barbie
2023	Yorgos Lanthimos	Poor Things
2023	Martin Scorsese	Killers of the Flower Moon
2023	Celine Song	Past Lives
2024	Coralie Fargeat	The Substance
2024	Sean Baker	Anora
2024	Brady Corbet	The Brutalist
2024	RaMell Ross	Nickel Boys
2024	Denis Villeneuve	Dune: Part Two
