= Online Film Critics Society Award for Best Supporting Actor =

Annual film award

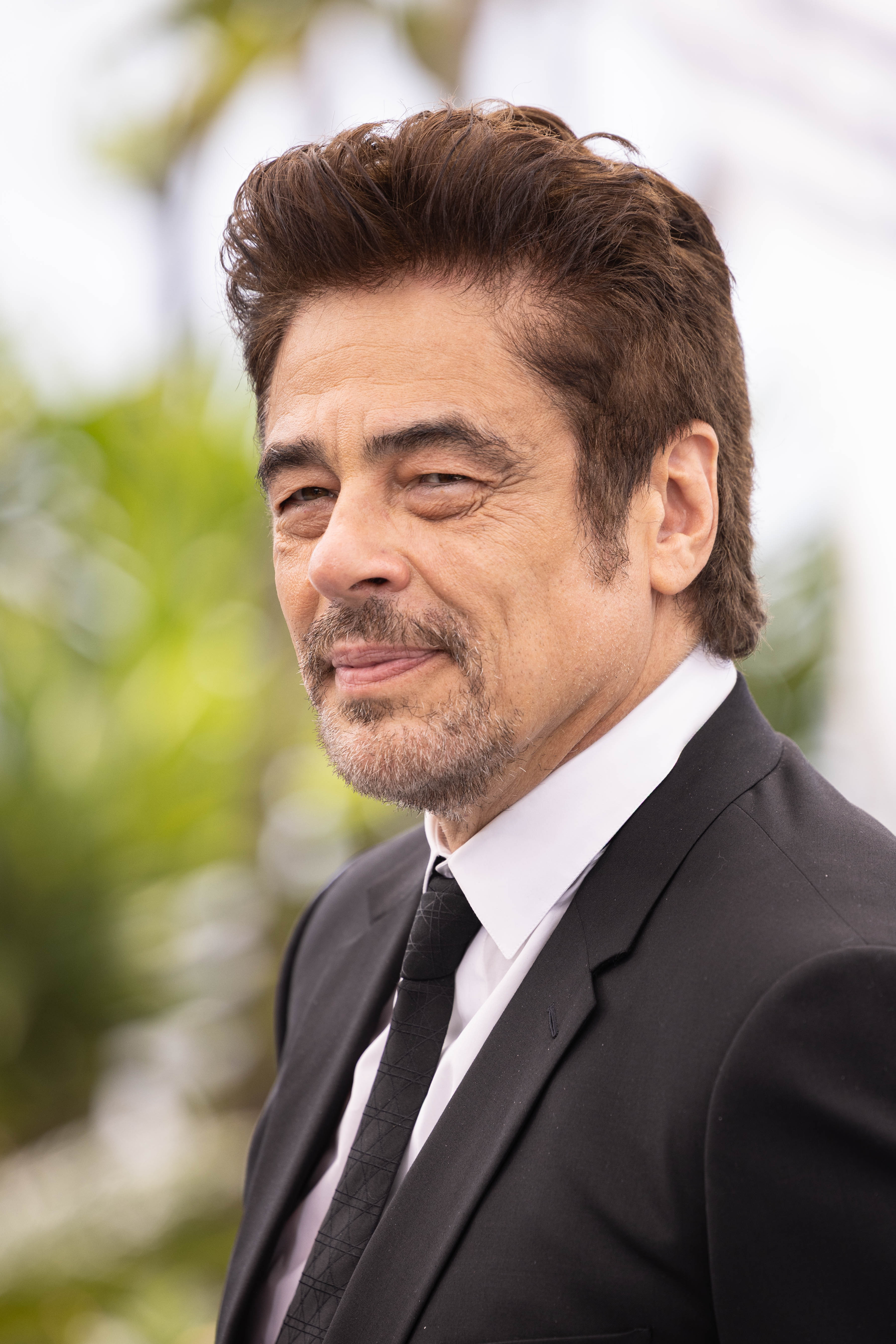
The 2025 recipient: Benicio del Toro

The Online Film Critics Society Award for Best Supporting Actor is an annual film award given by the Online Film Critics Society to honor the best supporting actor of the year.

== Winners ==
=== 1990s ===
Year	Winner	Film	Role
1997	Burt Reynolds	Boogie Nights	Jack Horner
1997	Rupert Everett	My Best Friend's Wedding	George Downes
1997	Anthony Hopkins	Amistad	John Quincy Adams
1998	Billy Bob Thornton	A Simple Plan	Jacob Mitchell
1998	Ed Harris	The Truman Show	Christof
1998	Jason Patric	Your Friends & Neighbors	Cary
1999	Haley Joel Osment	The Sixth Sense	Cole Sear
1999	Wes Bentley	American Beauty	Ricky Fitts
1999	Michael Clarke Duncan	The Green Mile	John Coffey
1999	John Malkovich	Being John Malkovich	John Horatio Malkovich
1999	Christopher Plummer	The Insider	Mike Wallace

=== 2000s ===
Year	Winner	Film	Role
2000	Benicio del Toro	Traffic	Javier Rodriguez
2000	Philip Seymour Hoffman	Almost Famous	Lester Bangs
2000	Jack Black	High Fidelity	Barry
2000	Willem Dafoe	Shadow of the Vampire	Max Schreck
2000	Albert Finney	Erin Brockovich	Edward L. Masry
2000	Joaquin Phoenix	Gladiator	Commodus
2001	Steve Buscemi	Ghost World	Seymour
2001	Ben Kingsley	Sexy Beast	Don Logan
2001	Jude Law	A.I. Artificial Intelligence	Gigolo Joe
2001	Ian McKellen	The Lord of the Rings: The Fellowship of the Ring	Gandalf the Grey
2001	Tony Shalhoub	The Man Who Wasn't There	Freddy Riedenschneider
2002	Dennis Quaid	Far from Heaven	Frank Whitaker
2002	Alan Arkin	Thirteen Conversations About One Thing	Gene
2002	Chris Cooper	Adaptation.	John Laroche
2002	Paul Newman	Road to Perdition	John Rooney
2002	Andy Serkis	The Lord of the Rings: The Two Towers	Sméagol/Gollum
2003	Peter Sarsgaard	Shattered Glass	Chuck Lane
2003	Sean Astin	The Lord of the Rings: The Return of the King	Samwise Gamgee
2003	Alec Baldwin	The Cooler	Shelly Kaplow
2003	Tim Robbins	Mystic River	Dave Boyle
2003	Andy Serkis	The Lord of the Rings: The Return of the King	Sméagol/Gollum
2004	Thomas Haden Church	Sideways	Jack Lopate
2004	David Carradine	Kill Bill: Volume 2	Bill
2004	Jamie Foxx	Collateral	Max Durocher
2004	Clive Owen	Closer	Larry Gray
2004	Peter Sarsgaard	Kinsey	Clyde Martin
2005	Mickey Rourke	Sin City	Marv
2005	Matt Dillon	Crash	Officer John Ryan
2005	Paul Giamatti	Cinderella Man	Joe Gould
2005	Jake Gyllenhaal	Brokeback Mountain	Jack Twist
2005	William Hurt	A History of Violence	Richie Cusack
2006	Jackie Earle Haley	Little Children	Ronald James McGorvey
2006	Alan Arkin	Little Miss Sunshine	Edwin Hoover
2006	Eddie Murphy	Dreamgirls	James "Thunder" Early
2006	Jack Nicholson	The Departed	Frank Costello
2006	Mark Wahlberg	The Departed	Sgt. Sean Dignam
2007	Javier Bardem	No Country for Old Men	Anton Chigurh
2007	Casey Affleck	The Assassination of Jesse James...	Robert Ford
2007	Philip Seymour Hoffman	Charlie Wilson's War	Gust Avrakotos
2007	Hal Holbrook	Into the Wild	Ron Franz
2007	Tom Wilkinson	Michael Clayton	Arthur Edens
2008	Heath Ledger posthumously	The Dark Knight	The Joker
2008	Robert Downey Jr.	Tropic Thunder	Kirk Lazarus
2008	Philip Seymour Hoffman	Doubt	Father Brendan Flynn
2008	Eddie Marsan	Happy-Go-Lucky	Scott
2008	Michael Shannon	Revolutionary Road	John Givings, Jr.
2009	Christoph Waltz	Inglourious Basterds	Col. Hans Landa
2009	Peter Capaldi	In the Loop	Malcolm Tucker
2009	Jackie Earle Haley	Watchmen	Walter Kovacs / Rorschach
2009	Woody Harrelson	The Messenger	Capt. Tony Stone
2009	Anthony Mackie	The Hurt Locker	Sergeant J. T. Sanborn

=== 2010s ===
Year	Winner	Film	Role
2010	Christian Bale	The Fighter	Dicky Eklund
2010	Andrew Garfield	The Social Network	Eduardo Saverin
2010	John Hawkes	Winter's Bone	Teardrop Dolly
2010	Mark Ruffalo	The Kids Are All Right	Paul Hatfield
2010	Geoffrey Rush	The King's Speech	Lionel Logue
2011	Christopher Plummer	Beginners	Hal Fields
2011	Albert Brooks	Drive	Bernie Rose
2011	John Hawkes	Martha Marcy May Marlene	Patrick
2011	Nick Nolte	Warrior	Paddy Conlon
2011	Brad Pitt	The Tree of Life	Mr. O'Brien
2012	Philip Seymour Hoffman	The Master	Lancaster Dodd
2012	Alan Arkin	Argo	Lester Siegel
2012	Dwight Henry	Beasts of the Southern Wild	Wink
2012	Tommy Lee Jones	Lincoln	Thaddeus Stevens
2012	Christoph Waltz	Django Unchained	Dr. King Schultz
2013	Michael Fassbender	12 Years a Slave	Edwin Epps
2013	Barkhad Abdi	Captain Phillips	Abduwali Muse
2013	Jared Leto	Dallas Buyers Club	Rayon
2013	Matthew McConaughey	Mud	Mud
2013	Sam Rockwell	The Way, Way Back	Owen
2014	Edward Norton	Birdman	Mike Shiner
2014	Josh Brolin	Inherent Vice	Lt. Det. Christian "Bigfoot" Bjornsen
2014	Ethan Hawke	Boyhood	Mason Evans, Sr.
2014	Mark Ruffalo	Foxcatcher	David Schultz
2014	J. K. Simmons	Whiplash	Terrence Fletcher
2015	Oscar Isaac	Ex Machina	Nathan Bateman
2015	Mark Ruffalo	Spotlight	Michael Rezendes
2015	Mark Rylance	Bridge of Spies	Rudolf Abel
2015	Sylvester Stallone	Creed	Rocky Balboa
2015	Benicio del Toro	Sicario	Alejandro
2016	Mahershala Ali	Moonlight	Juan
2016	Tom Bennett	Love & Friendship	Sir James Martin
2016	Jeff Bridges	Hell or High Water	Marcus Hamilton
2016	Lucas Hedges	Manchester by the Sea	Patrick Chandler
2016	Michael Shannon	Nocturnal Animals	Detective Bobby Andes
2017	Sam Rockwell	Three Billboards Outside Ebbing, Missouri	Officer Jason Dixon
2017	Armie Hammer	Call Me by Your Name	Oliver
2017	Richard Jenkins	The Shape of Water	Giles
2017	Patrick Stewart	Logan	Charles Xavier
2017	Michael Stuhlbarg	Call Me by Your Name	Mr. Perlman
2018	Michael B. Jordan	Black Panther	Erik Killmonger
2018	Adam Driver	BlacKkKlansman	Flip Zimmerman
2018	Mahershala Ali	Green Book	Dr. Donald Shirley
2018	Richard E. Grant	Can You Ever Forgive Me?	Jack Hock
2018	Steven Yeun	Burning	Ben
2019	Brad Pitt	Once Upon a Time in Hollywood	Cliff Booth
2019	Al Pacino	The Irishman	Jimmy Hoffa
2019	Joe Pesci	The Irishman	Russell Bufalino
2019	Song Kang-ho	Parasite	Kim Ki-taek
2019	Willem Dafoe	The Lighthouse	Thomas Wake

=== 2020s ===
Year	Winner	Film	Role
2020	Leslie Odom Jr.	One Night in Miami...	Sam Cooke
2020	Sacha Baron Cohen	The Trial of the Chicago 7	Abbie Hoffman
2020	Chadwick Boseman	Da 5 Bloods	"Stormin'" Norman Earl Holloway
2020	Bill Murray	On the Rocks	Felix Keane
2020	Paul Raci	Sound of Metal	Joe
2021	Kodi Smit-McPhee	The Power of the Dog	Peter Gordon
2021	Mike Faist	West Side Story	Riff
2021	Ciarán Hinds	Belfast	Pop
2021	Troy Kotsur	CODA	Frank Rossi
2021	Jeffrey Wright	The French Dispatch	Roebuck Wright
2022	Ke Huy Quan	Everything Everywhere All At Once	Waymond Wang
2022	Barry Keoghan	The Banshees of Inisherin	Dominic Kearney
2022	Brendan Gleeson	The Banshees of Inisherin	Colm Doherty
2022	Brian Tyree Henry	Causeway	James
2022	Paul Dano	The Fabelmans	Burt Fabelman
2023	Robert Downey Jr.	Oppenheimer	Lewis Strauss
2023	Robert De Niro	Killers of the Flower Moon	William King Hale
2023	Ryan Gosling	Barbie	Ken
2023	Charles Melton	May December	Joe Yoo
2023	Mark Ruffalo	Poor Things	Duncan Wedderburn
2024	Kieran Culkin	A Real Pain	Benji Kaplan
2024	Yura Borisov	Anora	Igor
2024	Clarence Maclin	Sing Sing	Himself
2024	Edward Norton	A Complete Unknown	Pete Seeger
2024	Guy Pearce	The Brutalist	Harrison Lee Van Buren
