= Online Film Critics Society Award for Best Picture =

Annual film award

- Presented by: Online Film Critics Society
- First award: 1998 (for films released in 1997)
- Currently held by: Anora

The Online Film Critics Society Award for Best Picture is an annual film award given by the Online Film Critics Society to honor the best picture of the year.

== Winners and nominees ==
=== 1990s ===
| Year | Winner and nominees | Director(s) |
|---|---|---|
| 1997 | L.A. Confidential | Curtis Hanson |
| 1997 | The Sweet Hereafter | Atom Egoyan |
| 1997 | Titanic | James Cameron |
| 1998 | Saving Private Ryan | Steven Spielberg |
| 1998 | Life is Beautiful | Roberto Benigni |
| 1998 | The Truman Show | Peter Weir |
| 1999 | American Beauty | Sam Mendes |
| 1999 | Being John Malkovich | Spike Jonze |
| 1999 | Fight Club | David Fincher |
| 1999 | The Insider | Michael Mann |
| 1999 | Toy Story 2 | John Lasseter |

=== 2000s ===
| Year | Winner and nominees | Director(s) |
|---|---|---|
| 2000 | Almost Famous | Cameron Crowe |
| 2000 | Crouching Tiger, Hidden Dragon | Ang Lee |
| 2000 | Dancer in the Dark | Lars von Trier |
| 2000 | Requiem for a Dream | Darren Aronofsky |
| 2000 | Traffic | Steven Soderbergh |
| 2001 | Memento | Christopher Nolan |
| 2001 | Mulholland Drive | David Lynch |
| 2001 | Ghost World | Terry Zwigoff |
| 2001 | In the Bedroom | Todd Field |
| 2001 | The Lord of the Rings: The Fellowship of the Ring | Peter Jackson |
| 2002 | The Lord of the Rings: The Two Towers | Peter Jackson |
| 2002 | Adaptation. | Spike Jonze |
| 2002 | Bowling for Columbine | Michael Moore |
| 2002 | Far from Heaven | Todd Haynes |
| 2002 | Minority Report | Steven Spielberg |
| 2003 | The Lord of the Rings: The Return of the King | Peter Jackson |
| 2003 | City of God | Fernando Meirelles |
| 2003 | Kill Bill: Volume 1 | Quentin Tarantino |
| 2003 | Lost in Translation | Sofia Coppola |
| 2003 | Mystic River | Clint Eastwood |
| 2004 | Eternal Sunshine of the Spotless Mind | Michel Gondry |
| 2004 | Before Sunset | Richard Linklater |
| 2004 | Garden State | Zach Braff |
| 2004 | The Incredibles | Brad Bird |
| 2004 | Sideways | Alexander Payne |
| 2005 | A History of Violence | David Cronenberg |
| 2005 | Brokeback Mountain | Ang Lee |
| 2005 | Crash | Paul Haggis |
| 2005 | Good Night, and Good Luck. | George Clooney |
| 2005 | Munich | Steven Spielberg |
| 2006 | United 93 | Paul Greengrass |
| 2006 | Babel | Alejandro González Iñárritu |
| 2006 | Children of Men | Alfonso Cuarón |
| 2006 | The Departed | Martin Scorsese |
| 2006 | Pan's Labyrinth | Guillermo del Toro |
| 2007 | No Country for Old Men | Joel Coen and Ethan Coen |
| 2007 | Atonement | Joe Wright |
| 2007 | Juno | Jason Reitman |
| 2007 | There Will Be Blood | Paul Thomas Anderson |
| 2007 | Zodiac | David Fincher |
| 2008 | WALL-E | Andrew Stanton |
| 2008 | The Curious Case of Benjamin Button | David Fincher |
| 2008 | The Dark Knight | Christopher Nolan |
| 2008 | Slumdog Millionaire | Danny Boyle |
| 2008 | The Wrestler | Darren Aronofsky |
| 2009 | The Hurt Locker | Kathryn Bigelow |
| 2009 | Inglourious Basterds | Quentin Tarantino |
| 2009 | A Serious Man | Joel Coen and Ethan Coen |
| 2009 | Up | Pete Docter |
| 2009 | Up in the Air | Jason Reitman |

=== 2010s ===
| Year | Winner and nominees | Director(s) |
|---|---|---|
| 2010 | The Social Network | David Fincher |
| 2010 | Black Swan | Darren Aronofsky |
| 2010 | Inception | Christopher Nolan |
| 2010 | Toy Story 3 | Lee Unkrich |
| 2010 | True Grit | Joel Coen and Ethan Coen |
| 2010 | Winter's Bone | Debra Granik |
| 2011 | The Tree of Life | Terrence Malick |
| 2011 | The Artist | Michel Hazanavicius |
| 2011 | The Descendants | Alexander Payne |
| 2011 | Drive | Nicolas Winding Refn |
| 2011 | Hugo | Martin Scorsese |
| 2012 | Argo | Ben Affleck |
| 2012 | Holy Motors | Leos Carax |
| 2012 | The Master | Paul Thomas Anderson |
| 2012 | Moonrise Kingdom | Wes Anderson |
| 2012 | Zero Dark Thirty | Kathryn Bigelow |
| 2013 | 12 Years a Slave | Steve McQueen |
| 2013 | American Hustle | David O. Russell |
| 2013 | Before Midnight | Richard Linklater |
| 2013 | Blue is the Warmest Color | Abdellatif Kechiche |
| 2013 | Drug War | Johnnie To |
| 2013 | Gravity | Alfonso Cuarón |
| 2013 | Her | Spike Jonze |
| 2013 | Inside Llewyn Davis | Joel Coen and Ethan Coen |
| 2013 | Short Term 12 | Destin Cretton |
| 2013 | The Wind Rises | Hayao Miyazaki |
| 2014 | The Grand Budapest Hotel | Wes Anderson |
| 2014 | Boyhood | Richard Linklater |
| 2014 | Ida | Paweł Pawlikowski |
| 2014 | The Lego Movie | Phil Lord and Christopher Miller |
| 2014 | Mommy | Xavier Dolan |
| 2014 | Nightcrawler | Dan Gilroy |
| 2014 | Selma | Ava DuVernay |
| 2014 | Two Days, One Night | Luc Dardenne and Jean-Pierre Dardenne |
| 2014 | Under the Skin | Jonathan Glazer |
| 2014 | Whiplash | Damien Chazelle |
| 2015 | Mad Max: Fury Road | George Miller |
| 2015 | Brooklyn | John Crowley |
| 2015 | Carol | Todd Haynes |
| 2015 | Ex Machina | Alex Garland |
| 2015 | Inside Out | Ronnie Del Carmen and Pete Docter |
| 2015 | The Martian | Ridley Scott |
| 2015 | The Revenant | Alejandro González Iñárritu |
| 2015 | Room | Lenny Abrahamson |
| 2015 | Sicario | Denis Villeneuve |
| 2015 | Spotlight | Tom McCarthy |
| 2016 | Moonlight | Barry Jenkins |
| 2016 | Arrival | Denis Villeneuve |
| 2016 | The Handmaiden | Park Chan-wook |
| 2016 | Hell or High Water | Davie Mackenzie |
| 2016 | Jackie | Pablo Larraín |
| 2016 | La La Land | Damien Chazelle |
| 2016 | Manchester by the Sea | Kenneth Lonergan |
| 2016 | O.J.: Made in America | Ezra Edelman |
| 2016 | Paterson | Jim Jarmusch |
| 2016 | The Witch | Robert Eggers |
| 2017 | Get Out | Jordan Peele |
| 2017 | Call Me by Your Name | Luca Guadagnino |
| 2017 | Dunkirk | Christopher Nolan |
| 2017 | The Florida Project | Sean Baker |
| 2017 | A Ghost Story | David Lowery |
| 2017 | Lady Bird | Greta Gerwig |
| 2017 | Mother! | Darren Aronofsky |
| 2017 | Phantom Thread | Paul Thomas Anderson |
| 2017 | The Shape of Water | Guillermo del Toro |
| 2017 | Three Billboards Outside Ebbing, Missouri | Martin McDonagh |
| 2018 | Roma | Alfonso Cuarón |
| 2018 | BlacKkKlansman | Spike Lee |
| 2018 | If Beale Street Could Talk | Barry Jenkins |
| 2018 | First Reformed | Paul Schrader |
| 2018 | The Favourite | Yorgos Lanthimos |
| 2018 | You Were Never Really Here | Lynne Ramsay |
| 2018 | Annihilation | Alex Garland |
| 2018 | Eighth Grade | Bo Burnham |
| 2018 | Hereditary | Ari Aster |
| 2018 | A Star Is Born | Bradley Cooper |
| 2018 | Suspiria | Luca Guadagnino |
| 2019 | Parasite | Bong Joon-ho |
| 2019 | 1917 | Sam Mendes |
| 2019 | The Irishman | Martin Scorsese |
| 2019 | Jojo Rabbit | Taika Waititi |
| 2019 | Knives Out | Rian Johnson |
| 2019 | Marriage Story | Noah Baumbach |
| 2019 | Once Upon a Time in Hollywood | Quentin Tarantino |
| 2019 | Portrait of a Lady on Fire | Céline Sciamma |
| 2019 | Uncut Gems | Josh & Benny Safdie |
| 2019 | Us | Jordan Peele |

=== 2020s ===
| Year | Winner and nominees | Director(s) |
|---|---|---|
| 2020 | Nomadland | Chloé Zhao |
| 2020 | Da 5 Bloods | Spike Lee |
| 2020 | First Cow | Kelly Reichardt |
| 2020 | I'm Thinking of Ending Things | Charlie Kaufman |
| 2020 | Minari | Lee Isaac Chung |
| 2020 | Never Rarely Sometimes Always | Eliza Hittman |
| 2020 | Promising Young Woman | Emerald Fennell |
| 2020 | Soul | Pete Docter and Kemp Powers |
| 2020 | Sound of Metal | Darius Marder |
| 2020 | The Trial of the Chicago 7 | Aaron Sorkin |
| 2021 | The Power of the Dog | Jane Campion |
| 2021 | Belfast | Kenneth Branagh |
| 2021 | Drive My Car | Ryusuke Hamaguchi |
| 2021 | Dune | Denis Villeneuve |
| 2021 | The Green Knight | David Lowery |
| 2021 | Licorice Pizza | Paul Thomas Anderson |
| 2021 | Pig | Michael Sarnoski |
| 2021 | Titane | Julia Ducournau |
| 2021 | West Side Story | Steven Spielberg |
| 2021 | The Worst Person in the World | Joachim Trier |
| 2022 | Everything Everywhere All at Once | Daniel Kwan and Daniel Scheinert |
| 2022 | Aftersun | Charlotte Wells |
| 2022 | The Banshees of Inisherin | Martin McDonagh |
| 2022 | EO | Jerzy Skolimowski |
| 2022 | The Fabelmans | Steven Spielberg |
| 2022 | Nope | Jordan Peele |
| 2022 | RRR | S. S. Rajamouli |
| 2022 | Tár | Todd Field |
| 2022 | Top Gun: Maverick | Joseph Kosinski |
| 2022 | Women Talking | Sarah Polley |
| 2023 | Oppenheimer | Christopher Nolan |
| 2023 | Anatomy of a Fall | Justine Triet |
| 2023 | Asteroid City | Wes Anderson |
| 2023 | Barbie | Greta Gerwig |
| 2023 | The Holdovers | Alexander Payne |
| 2023 | Killers of the Flower Moon | Martin Scorsese |
| 2023 | May December | Todd Haynes |
| 2023 | Past Lives | Celine Song |
| 2023 | Poor Things | Yorgos Lanthimos |
| 2023 | The Zone of Interest | Jonathan Glazer |
| 2024 | Anora | Sean Baker |
| 2024 | The Brutalist | Brady Corbet |
| 2024 | Challengers | Luca Guadagnino |
| 2024 | Conclave | Edward Berger |
| 2024 | Dune: Part Two | Denis Villeneuve |
| 2024 | Nickel Boys | RaMell Ross |
| 2024 | Nosferatu | Robert Eggers |
| 2024 | I Saw the TV Glow | Jane Schoenbrun |
| 2024 | The Substance | Coralie Fargeat |
| 2024 | Wicked | Jon M. Chu |
