= Online Film Critics Society =

International professional association of online film journalists

- Abbreviation: OFCS
- Formation: January 1997
- Founder: Harvey S. Karten
- Type: Film criticism
- Members: 284 (2020)
- Official language: English

The Online Film Critics Society (OFCS) is an international professional association of online film journalists, historians and scholars who publish their work on the World Wide Web. The organization was founded in January 1997 by Harvey S. Karten, an early online critic who discovered that membership in the New York Film Critics Circle was open only to journalists working for newspapers and magazines. Online critics have generally found it difficult to gain acceptance for their work, and one role of the OFCS is to provide professional recognition to the most prolific and successful online critics.

Since 1997, the OFCS has given out annual awards that recognize the best films in about seventeen categories. These awards are noted in the established print media such as Variety and The Hollywood Reporter, and are included in their annual speculation about the ultimate winners of the Academy Awards.

== Membership ==
Critics whose primary media affiliation is a print publication, or radio or television, are excluded; this criterion distinguishes the OFCS from associations, such as the Hollywood Foreign Press Association, which is responsible for the annual, widely televised Golden Globe Awards. Applicants for membership in the OFCS must have published at least 100 film reviews over at least two years, and are subject to a peer review process to establish the quality of their work. Of hundreds of applications that are received, only a "tiny number" are accepted. As of January 2020, there were 284 members worldwide.

Its membership includes writers for such film-related websites as Apollo Movie Guide, DVDTalk, eFilmCritic.com, The Moving Arts Film Journal, FilmCritic.com (now defunct), FilmFocus, Film Threat, The Internet Movie Database, and Slant Magazine.

== Members ==
- Dennis Schwartz
- Kristian Lin

== Award ceremonies ==
- 1997
- 1998
- 1999
- 2000
- 2001
- 2002
- 2003
- 2004
- 2005
- 2006
- 2007
- 2008
- 2009
- 2010
- 2011
- 2012
- 2013
- 2014
- 2015
- 2016
- 2017
- 2018
- 2019
- 2020
- 2021
- 2022
- 2023
- 2024
- 2025

== Current award categories ==
- Best Picture
- Best Director
- Best Actor
- Best Actress
- Best Supporting Actor
- Best Supporting Actress
- Best Documentary Film
- Best Foreign Language Film

(aka Best Film Not in the English Language)

- Best Adapted Screenplay (1998–1999, 2001–)
- Best Original Screenplay (1998–1999, 2001–)
- Best Original Score (1998–2009, 2018–)
- Best Cinematography (1998–)
- Best Editing (1998–2000, 2002, 2004–)
- Best Breakthrough Filmmaker (1999, 2001–)
- Best Breakthrough Performance (2000–)
- Best Animated Feature (2001–)
- Best Costume Design (2002–2003, 2021–)
- Best Production Design (2002–2003, 2021–)
- Best Visual Effects
- Special Achievement Award (1999, 2011–)

== Previous award categories ==
- Online Film Critics Society Discontinued Awards
