= Online Film Critics Society Award for Best Animated Film =

Annual film award

The Online Film Critics Society Award for Best Animated Feature is an annual film award given by the Online Film Critics Society to honor the best animated feature of the year.

== History ==
Toy Story and Spider-Verse are the only franchises with multiple wins, winning two times for Toy Story 3 (2010) and Toy Story 4 (2019) and for Into the Spider-Verse (2018) and Across the Spider-Verse (2023)

== Winners ==
=== 2000s ===
Year	Winner	Director
2001	Shrek	Andrew Adamson and Vicky Jenson
2001	Atlantis: The Lost Empire	Gary Trousdale and Kirk Wise
2001	Monsters, Inc.	Pete Docter
2001	Final Fantasy: The Spirits Within	Hironobu Sakaguchi
2001	Waking Life	Richard Linklater
2002	Spirited Away	Hayao Miyazaki
2002	Ice Age	Chris Wedge
2002	Lilo & Stitch	Chris Sanders
2002	Spirit: Stallion of the Cimarron	Kelly Asbury and Lorna Cook
2002	Metropolis	Rintaro
2003	Finding Nemo	Andrew Stanton
2003	Cowboy Bebop: The Movie	Shinichirō Watanabe
2003	Looney Tunes: Back in Action	Joe Dante and Eric Goldberg
2003	Millennium Actress	Satoshi Kon
2003	The Triplets of Belleville	Sylvain Chomet
2004	The Incredibles	Brad Bird
2004	Ghost in the Shell 2: Innocence	Mamoru Oshii
2004	The Polar Express	Robert Zemeckis
2004	Shrek 2	Andrew Adamson, Kelly Asbury and Conrad Vernon
2004	Team America: World Police	Trey Parker
2005	Wallace & Gromit: The Curse of the Were-Rabbit	Steve Box and Nick Park
2005	Corpse Bride	Tim Burton
2005	Howl’s Moving Castle	Hayao Miyazaki
2005	Madagascar	Eric Darnell and Tom McGrath
2005	Robots	Chris Wedge
2006	A Scanner Darkly	Richard Linklater
2006	Cars	John Lasseter
2006	Happy Feet	George Miller
2006	Monster House	Gil Kenan
2006	Over the Hedge	Tim Johnson and Karey Kirkpatrick
2007	Ratatouille	Brad Bird
2007	Beowulf	Robert Zemeckis
2007	Paprika	Satoshi Kon
2007	Persepolis	Marjane Satrapi and Vincent Paronnaud
2007	The Simpsons Movie	David Silverman
2008	WALL-E	Andrew Stanton
2008	Bolt	Chris Williams and Byron Howard
2008	Dr. Seuss' Horton Hears a Who!	Jimmy Hayward and Steve Martino
2008	Kung Fu Panda	John Stevenson and Mark Osborne
2008	Waltz with Bashir	Ari Folman
2009	Up	Pete Docter and Bob Peterson
2009	Coraline	Henry Selick
2009	Fantastic Mr. Fox	Wes Anderson
2009	Ponyo	Hayao Miyazaki
2009	The Princess and the Frog	John Musker and Ron Clements

=== 2010s ===
Year	Winner	Director
2010	Toy Story 3	Lee Unkrich
2010	Despicable Me	Chris Renaud and Pierre Coffin
2010	How to Train Your Dragon	Chris Sanders and Dean DeBlois
2010	The Illusionist	Sylvain Chomet
2010	Tangled	Nathan Greno and Byron Howard
2011	Rango	Gore Verbinski
2011	The Adventures of Tintin	Steven Spielberg
2011	Arthur Christmas	Sarah Smith
2011	Kung Fu Panda 2	Jennifer Yuh Nelson
2011	Winnie the Pooh	Stephen Anderson and Don Hall
2012	ParaNorman	Sam Fell and Chris Butler
2012	Brave	Mark Andrews and Brenda Chapman
2012	Frankenweenie	Tim Burton
2012	The Secret World of Arrietty	Hiromasa Yonebayashi
2012	Wreck-It Ralph	Rich Moore
2013	The Wind Rises	Hayao Miyazaki
2013	Despicable Me 2	Chris Renaud and Pierre Coffin
2013	From Up on Poppy Hill	Gorō Miyazaki
2013	Frozen	Chris Buck and Jennifer Lee
2013	Monsters University	Dan Scanlon
2014	The Lego Movie	Phil Lord and Christopher Miller
2014	Big Hero 6	Don Hall and Chris Williams
2014	The Boxtrolls	Graham Annable and Anthony Stacchi
2014	How to Train Your Dragon 2	Dean DeBlois
2014	The Tale of the Princess Kaguya	Isao Takahata
2015	Inside Out	Ronnie del Carmen and Pete Docter
2015	Anomalisa	Charlie Kaufman and Duke Johnson
2015	The Good Dinosaur	Peter Sohn
2015	The Peanuts Movie	Steve Martino
2015	Shaun the Sheep Movie	Mark Burton and Richard Starzak
2016	Kubo and the Two Strings	Travis Knight
2016	Finding Dory	Andrew Stanton
2016	Moana	John Musker and Ron Clements
2016	The Red Turtle	Michaël Dudok de Wit
2016	Zootopia	Byron Howard and Rich Moore
2017	Coco	Lee Unkrich
2017	In This Corner of the World	Sunao Katabuchi
2017	The Lego Batman Movie	Chris McKay
2017	Loving Vincent	Dorota Kobiela and Hugh Welchman
2017	The Breadwinner	Nora Twomey
2018	Spider-Man: Into the Spider-Verse	Bob Persichetti, Peter Ramsey, and Rodney Rothman
2018	Incredibles 2	Brad Bird
2018	Isle of Dogs	Wes Anderson
2018	Mirai	Mamoru Hosoda
2018	Ralph Breaks the Internet	Rich Moore and Phil Johnston
2019	Toy Story 4	Josh Cooley
2019	Frozen 2	Chris Buck and Jennifer Lee
2019	How to Train Your Dragon: The Hidden World	Dean DeBlois
2019	I Lost My Body	Jérémy Clapin
2019	Missing Link	Chris Butler

=== 2020s ===
Year	Winner	Director
2020	Soul	Pete Docter
2020	Onward	Dan Scanlon
2020	Over the Moon	Glen Keane
2020	The Wolf House	Cristobal León and Joaquín Cociña
2020	Wolfwalkers	Tomm Moore and Ross Stewart
2021	The Mitchells vs. the Machines	Mike Rianda
2021	Encanto	Jared Bush and Byron Howard
2021	Flee	Jonas Poher Rasmussen
2021	Luca	Enrico Casarosa
2021	Raya and the Last Dragon	Don Hall and Carlos López Estrada
2022	Guillermo del Toro's Pinocchio	Guillermo del Toro and Mark Gustafson
2022	Apollo 10 1/2: A Space Age Childhood	Richard Linklater
2022	Marcel the Shell with Shoes On	Dean Fleischer Camp
2022	Puss in Boots: The Last Wish	Joel Crawford
2022	Turning Red	Domee Shi
2023	Spider-Man: Across the Spider-Verse	Joaquim Dos Santos, Kemp Powers, and Justin K. Thompson
2023	The Boy and the Heron	Hayao Miyazaki
2023	Nimona	Nick Bruno and Troy Quane
2023	Robot Dreams	Pablo Berger
2023	Teenage Mutant Ninja Turtles: Mutant Mayhem	Jeff Rowe
2024	Flow	Gints Zilbalodis
2024	Inside Out 2	Kelsey Mann
2024	Memoir of a Snail	Adam Elliott
2024	Wallace & Gromit: Vengeance Most Fowl	Nick Park
2024	The Wild Robot	Chris Sanders
