= Online Film Critics Society Award for Best Original Score =

Annual film award

The Online Film Critics Society Award for Best Original Score is an annual film award given by the Online Film Critics Society to honor the best original score of the year.

== Winners ==
=== 1990s ===
Year	Winner	Composer(s)
1998	Pleasantville	Randy Newman
1998	The Prince of Egypt	Hans Zimmer
1998	Saving Private Ryan	John Williams
1999	South Park: Bigger, Longer & Uncut	Marc Shaiman
1999	American Beauty	Thomas Newman
1999	Eyes Wide Shut	Jocelyn Pook
1999	Star Wars Episode I: The Phantom Menace	John Williams
1999	The Straight Story	Angelo Badalamenti

=== 2000s ===
Year	Winner	Composer(s)
2000	Requiem for a Dream	Clint Mansell
2000	Crouching Tiger, Hidden Dragon	Tan Dun
2000	Dancer in the Dark	Björk
2000	Gladiator	Hans Zimmer, Lisa Gerrard, and Klaus Badelt
2000	O Brother, Where Art Thou?	T-Bone Burnett and Carter Burwell
2001	Mulholland Drive	Angelo Badalamenti
2001	A.I. Artificial Intelligence	John Williams
2001	The Lord of the Rings: The Fellowship of the Ring	Howard Shore
2001	Moulin Rouge!	Craig Armstrong and Marius de Vries
2001	Ocean’s Eleven	David Holmes
2002	Far from Heaven	Elmer Bernstein
2002	Catch Me If You Can	John Williams
2002	The Lord of the Rings: The Two Towers	Howard Shore
2002	Punch-Drunk Love	Jon Brion
2002	Signs	James Newton Howard
2003	The Lord of the Rings: The Return of the King	Howard Shore
2003	Kill Bill: Vol. 1	RZA
2003	The Last Samurai	Hans Zimmer
2003	Lost in Translation	Brian Reitzell and Kevin Shields
2003	Pirates of the Caribbean: The Curse of the Black Pearl	Klaus Badelt
2004	The Incredibles	Michael Giacchino
2004	The Aviator	Howard Shore
2004	Birth	Alexandre Desplat
2004	Eternal Sunshine of the Spotless Mind	Jon Brion
2004	Hero	Tan Dun
2005	Brokeback Mountain	Gustavo Santaolalla
2005	Batman Begins	James Newton Howard and Hans Zimmer
2005	King Kong	James Newton Howard
2005	Munich	John Williams
2005	The New World	James Horner
2006	The Fountain	Clint Mansell
2006	Babel	Gustavo Santaolalla
2006	The Illusionist	Philip Glass
2006	Notes on a Scandal	Philip Glass
2006	Pan’s Labyrinth	Javier Navarrete
2007	There Will Be Blood	Jonny Greenwood
2007	The Assassination of Jesse James by the Coward Robert Ford	Nick Cave and Warren Ellis
2007	Atonement	Dario Marianelli
2007	Into the Wild	Michael Brook, Kaki King, and Eddie Vedder
2007	Once	Glen Hansard and Markéta Irglová
2008	The Dark Knight	James Newton Howard and Hans Zimmer
2008	The Curious Case of Benjamin Button	Alexandre Desplat
2008	Milk	Danny Elfman
2008	Slumdog Millionaire	A. R. Rahman
2008	WALL-E	Thomas Newman
2009	Up	Michael Giacchino
2009	Fantastic Mr. Fox	Alexandre Desplat
2009	The Informant!	Marvin Hamlisch
2009	Star Trek	Michael Giacchino
2009	Where the Wild Things Are	Carter Burwell and Karen O

=== 2010s ===
Year	Winner	Composer(s)
2018	If Beale Street Could Talk	Nicholas Britell
2018	Black Panther	Ludwig Göransson
2018	First Man	Justin Hurwitz
2018	Isle of Dogs	Alexandre Desplat
2018	Suspiria	Thom Yorke
2019	Us	Michael Abels
2019	Joker	Hildur Guðnadóttir
2019	Little Women	Alexandre Desplat
2019	Marriage Story	Randy Newman
2019	1917	Thomas Newman

=== 2020s ===
Year	Winner	Composer(s)
2020	Soul	Trent Reznor and Atticus Ross
2020	Da 5 Bloods	Terence Blanchard
2020	Mank	Trent Reznor and Atticus Ross
2020	Minari	Emile Mosseri
2020	Tenet	Ludwig Goransson
2021	The Power of the Dog	Jonny Greenwood
2021	Dune	Hans Zimmer
2021	Encanto	Germaine Franco
2021	The French Dispatch	Alexandre Desplat
2021	Spencer	Jonny Greenwood
2022	The Banshees of Inisherin	Carter Burwell
2022	Babylon	Justin Hurwitz
2022	The Batman	Michael Giacchino
2022	The Fabelmans	John Williams
2022	Women Talking	Hildur Guðnadóttir
2023	Oppenheimer	Ludwig Göransson
2023	Killers of the Flower Moon	Robbie Robertson
2023	Poor Things	Jerskin Fendrix
2023	Spider-Man: Across the Spider-Verse	Daniel Pemberton
2023	The Zone of Interest	Mica Levi
2024	Challengers	Trent Reznor and Atticus Ross
2024	The Brutalist	Daniel Blumberg
2024	Conclave	Volker Bertelmann
2024	Dune: Part Two	Hans Zimmer
2024	The Wild Robot	Kris Bowers

== See also ==
- List of film music awards § Best score
