= List of films featuring unemployment =

This is a list of films featuring unemployment.

== B ==
- The Big Lebowski

== D ==
- Do Bigha Zameen

== G ==
- Gates of Paris
- The Grapes of Wrath

== H ==
- Heat

== I ==
- Idiot Box
- It's a Free World...

== K ==
- Kuhle Wampe

== M ==
- Master of the World
- Mondays in the Sun

== N ==
- Nadodikkattu
- Naukri
- New Kids Turbo
- No Other Choice
- Nomadland

== P ==
- Parasite
- Pather Panchali
- The Pursuit of Happyness

== R ==
- Raining Stones
- Ramji Rao Speaking
- Roti Kapada Aur Makaan

== S ==
- Shree 420

== T ==
- Time Out
- Tokyo Sonata
- Two Days, One Night

== W ==
- Washington Merry-Go-Round
