= Mulholland Drive (soundtrack) =

2001 film soundtrack album

David Lynch's Mulholland Dr. (Music from the Motion Picture)

Soundtrack album by Angelo Badalamenti and David Lynch
- Released: October 9, 2001
- Genres: Electronic; jazz; rock; pop; downtempo; pop rock; ambience
- Length: 73:58
- Label: Milan
- Compilers: David Lynch; John Neff

David Lynch's Mulholland Dr. (Music from the Motion Picture) is the soundtrack album to the 2001 film Mulholland Drive directed by David Lynch starring Naomi Watts, Laura Harring, Justin Theroux, Ann Miller and Robert Forster. The album featured original score composed by recurring Lynch collaborator Angelo Badalamenti, while Lynch also provided few songs with John Neff and other existing songs were used in the film. Milan Records released the soundtrack on October 9, 2001.

== Background and development ==
Lynch's frequent collaborator Angelo Badalamenti had provided the score for Mulholland Drive; it was also their last film together. Mulholland Drive was initially envisioned as a television pilot for which Badalamenti had thought of a synth score in mind. But as Lynch had the option to make this into a feature film, Badalamenti then changed the landscape to an orchestral score and further wrote 90 minutes of score for the film. However, he further admitted on writing even more music for the film as "there was a tremendous amount of musical options for it."

Badalamenti described a particular technique applied to the sound design of the film, where he would provide multiple ten- to twelve-minute tracks which layered at a slow tempo, that they describe "firewood", and then record them with a full orchestra while also adding a bit of synthesizers. Lynch then took those tracks and experiment it with resulting in the eerie sound design. Badalmenti admitted that Lynch liked a variety of musical styles ranging from Russian to Eastern European and he wanted him to emulate the style for the title music, but for it to be beautiful at the same time. Lynch then asked Badalamenti to use that pieces in different places and different ways, as he wanted the audience to relate to the main theme.

Lynch then asked Badalamenti to play a sample of classical music for the film, ranging from artists such as Dmitri Shostakovich and Richard Wagner. Upon playing the particular pieces, Lynch then noticed on how the notes would fly and ask Badalamenti about the same, only to replay it and then repeats it until he finds a particular note that intrigued. Eventually, he suggested Badalamenti to play the pieces together to form the theme of Mulholland Drive. Lynch was also credited as the composer for the film, providing few musical pieces with John Neff.

The opening music resembled a big-band swing of the 1940s which was however recorded in an abstract way, so that the audience would not understand the events happening offscreen, despite the piece having a Glenn Miller-kind of rhythm. Further a "strange and off-center blues piece" was written for the theater magician scene, which Badalamenti considered much closer to him. Specific themes were written for the main characters. The string ensemble for the recording consisted of 62 players, with some synthesizers, while Badalamenti also used brass, woodwinds and percussions for the magic scene and opening dance.

== Reception ==
The album progresses much like a typical Lynch film, opening with a quick, pleasant Jitterbug and then slowly delving into darker string passages, the twangy guitar sounds of '50s diner music and, finally, the layered, disturbing, often confusing underbelly of the score.

— Neil Shurley, 2002

Reviewers described Mulholland Drive as one of Badalamenti's darkest scores. Music critic Jonathan Broxton felt that the film's music, "could almost be taken as an exercise in sound design than anything resembling conventional music." Describing the soundtrack as "equally eerie, elegant, and eclectic", Heather Phares of AllMusic said, "More focused than the Lost Highway soundtrack and more traditionally Lynchian than the score for The Straight Story, Mulholland Drive is a mysterious and affecting soundtrack from one of the most consistently creative teams working in film." Chris Feil of The Film Experience summarized that "The awe Lynch creates hides the moebius strip of its two narratives, with music being the primary tool – if we're not singing along, we find ourselves surprised to be crying."

== Track listing ==
No.	Title	Artist(s)	Length
1.	"Jitterbug"	Angelo Badalamenti	1:27
2.	"Main Title Theme"	Angelo Badalamenti	4:16
3.	"Rita Walks/Sunset Boulevard/Aunt Ruth"	Angelo Badalamenti	1:55
4.	"Diner"	Angelo Badalamenti	4:16
5.	"Mr. Roque"	Angelo Badalamenti	4:06
6.	"The Beast"	Milt Buckner	2:29
7.	"Bring It On Home"	Sonny Boy Williamson II	2:39
8.	"I've Told Ev'ry Little Star"	Linda Scott	2:17
9.	"Dwarfland/Love Theme"	Angelo Badalamenti	12:14
10.	"Silencio"	Angelo Badalamenti	4:27
11.	"Llorando"	Rebekah Del Rio	3:32
12.	"Pretty Fifties"	David Lynch; John Neff	3:02
13.	"Go Get Some"	David Lynch; John Neff	7:09
14.	"Diane & Camilla"	Angelo Badalamenti	4:48
15.	"Dinner Party Pool Music"	Angelo Badalamenti	1:26
16.	"Mountains Falling"	David Lynch; John Neff	8:15
17.	"Ending/Love Theme"	Angelo Badalamenti	5:40
Total length:			73:58

== Awards ==
Award	Category	Recipient	Result	Ref.
AFI Awards	Composer of the Year	Angelo Badalamenti	Nominated	
BAFTA Awards	Best Film Music	Angelo Badalamenti	Nominated	
Chicago Film Critics Awards	Best Original Score	Angelo Badalamenti	Nominated	
Golden Globe Awards	Best Original Score	Angelo Badalamenti	Nominated	
Online Film Critics Society	Best Original Score	Angelo Badalamenti	Won	
Saturn Awards	Saturn Award for Best Music	Angelo Badalamenti	Nominated	

== Sources ==
- McGowan, Todd (2007). The Impossible David Lynch. Columbia University Press. ISBN 978-0-231-13955-7.
