= Online Film Critics Society Awards 2014 =

18th Online Film Critics Society Awards

18th Online Film Critics Society Awards
- Date: December 15, 2014

Highlights
- Most awards: 3 (The Grand Budapest Hotel, Birdman)
- Most nominations: 6 (The Grand Budapest Hotel, Boyhood)

The 18th Online Film Critics Society, honoring the best in film for 2014, were announced on December 8, 2014. The winners were announced on December 15, 2014.

== Nominees ==
Best Picture	Best Director
The Grand Budapest Hotel; Boyhood; Ida; The Lego Movie; Mommy; Nightcrawler; Selma; Two Days, One Night; Whiplash; Under the Skin	Richard Linklater – Boyhood; Wes Anderson – The Grand Budapest Hotel; Jean-Pierre Dardenne and Luc Dardenne – Two Days, One Night; Ava DuVernay – Selma; Jonathan Glazer – Under the Skin
Best Actor	Best Actress
Michael Keaton – Birdman; Ralph Fiennes – The Grand Budapest Hotel; Brendan Gleeson – Calvary; Jake Gyllenhaal – Nightcrawler; Timothy Spall – Mr. Turner	Rosamund Pike – Gone Girl; Marion Cotillard – Two Days, One Night; Essie Davis – The Babadook; Anne Dorval – Mommy; Julianne Moore – Still Alice
Best Supporting Actor	Best Supporting Actress
Edward Norton – Birdman; Josh Brolin – Inherent Vice; Ethan Hawke – Boyhood; Mark Ruffalo – Foxcatcher; J. K. Simmons – Whiplash	Patricia Arquette – Boyhood; Jessica Chastain – A Most Violent Year; Suzanne Clément – Mommy; Agata Kulesza – Ida; Tilda Swinton – Snowpiercer
Best Animated Feature	Best Film Not in the English Language
The Lego Movie; Big Hero 6; The Boxtrolls; How to Train Your Dragon 2; The Tale of the Princess Kaguya	Two Days, One Night; Ida; The Missing Picture; Mommy; The Tale of the Princess Kaguya
Best Documentary	Best Non-U.S. Release (non-competitive category)
Life Itself; Citizenfour; The Missing Picture; National Gallery; The Overnighters	’71; 10,000 km; Entre Nós; Han Gong-ju; Hard to Be a God; The Look of Silence; The Salt of the Earth; Timbuktu; The Tribe; What We Do in the Shadows
Best Adapted Screenplay	Best Original Screenplay
Gone Girl; Inherent Vice; Snowpiercer; Under the Skin; We Are the Best!	The Grand Budapest Hotel; Boyhood; Selma; Two Days, One Night; Whiplash
Best Editing	Best Cinematography
Birdman; Boyhood; Gone Girl; The Grand Budapest Hotel; Whiplash	The Grand Budapest Hotel; Birdman; Ida; Mr. Turner; Under the Skin
