= Online Film Critics Society Awards 2019 =

23rd Online Film Critics Society Awards

23rd Online Film Critics Society Awards

Highlights
- Best Picture: Parasite
- Most awards: Parasite (6)
- Most nominations: Once Upon a Time...in Hollywood (7)

The 23rd Online Film Critics Society Awards, honoring the best in film for 2019, were announced on January 6, 2020.

== Winners and nominees ==
Best Picture	Best Director
1. Parasite; 2. The Irishman; 3. Once Upon a Time...in Hollywood; 4. Marriage Story; 5. Knives Out; 6. Portrait of a Lady on Fire; 7. Us; 8. Uncut Gems; 9. 1917; 10. Jojo Rabbit	Bong Joon-ho – Parasite; Sam Mendes – 1917; Céline Sciamma – Portrait of a Lady on Fire; Martin Scorsese – The Irishman; Quentin Tarantino – Once Upon a Time… in Hollywood
Best Actor	Best Actress
Adam Driver – Marriage Story; Antonio Banderas – Pain and Glory; Robert De Niro – The Irishman; Joaquin Phoenix – Joker; Adam Sandler – Uncut Gems	Lupita Nyong’o – Us; Awkwafina – The Farewell; Scarlett Johansson – Marriage Story; Florence Pugh – Midsommar; Renée Zellweger – Judy
Best Supporting Actor	Best Supporting Actress
Brad Pitt – Once Upon a Time… in Hollywood; Willem Dafoe – The Lighthouse; Al Pacino – The Irishman; Joe Pesci – The Irishman; Song Kang-ho – Parasite	Jennifer Lopez – Hustlers; Laura Dern – Marriage Story; Florence Pugh – Little Women; Margot Robbie – Once Upon a Time… in Hollywood; Zhao Shu-zhen – The Farewell
Best Animated Feature	Best Film Not in the English Language
Toy Story 4; Frozen 2; How to Train Your Dragon: The Hidden World; I Lost My Body; Missing Link	Parasite; Atlantics; Monos; Pain and Glory; Portrait of a Lady on Fire
Best Documentary	Best Debut Feature
Apollo 11; American Factory; For Sama; Honeyland; One Child Nation	Olivia Wilde – Booksmart; Mati Diop – Atlantics; Melina Matsoukas – Queen & Slim; Tyler Nilson and Michael Schwartz – The Peanut Butter Falcon; Joe Talbot – The Last Black Man in San Francisco
Best Original Screenplay	Best Adapted Screenplay
Bong Joon-ho and Han Jin-won – Parasite; Rian Johnson – Knives Out; Noah Baumbach – Marriage Story; Quentin Tarantino – Once Upon a Time...in Hollywood; Jordan Peele – Us	Steven Zaillian – The Irishman; Micah Fitzerman-Blue and Noah Harpster – A Beautiful Day in the Neighborhood; Lorene Scafaria – Hustlers; Taika Waititi – Jojo Rabbit; Greta Gerwig – Little Women
Best Editing	Best Cinematography
Yang Jin-mo – Parasite; Andrew Buckland and Michael McCusker – Ford v Ferrari; Thelma Schoonmaker – The Irishman; Lee Smith – 1917; Fred Raskin – Once Upon a Time...in Hollywood	Roger Deakins – 1917; Rodrigo Prieto – The Irishman; Jarin Blaschke – The Lighthouse; Robert Richardson – Once Upon a Time...in Hollywood; Claire Mathon – Portrait of a Lady on Fire
Best Original Score	
Michael Abels – Us; Hildur Guðnadóttir – Joker; Alexandre Desplat – Little Women; Randy Newman – Marriage Story; Thomas Newman – 1917

== Special awards ==
=== Technical Achievement Awards ===
- Ad Astra – Best Visual Effects
- John Wick: Chapter 3 – Parabellum – Best Stunt Coordination
- Knives Out – Best Acting Ensemble
- 1917 – Best Production Design
- Parasite – Best Production Design

=== Lifetime Achievement Awards ===
- Julie Andrews
- Olivia de Havilland
- Roger Corman
- Martin Scorsese
- John Waters

=== Non-U.S. Releases ===
- Bacurau (Brazil)
- Bait (United Kingdom)
- Beanpole (Russia)
- A Good Woman Is Hard to Find (United Kingdom)
- A Rainy Day in New York (USA)
- The Truth (France-Japan)
- Vitalina Varela (Portugal)
- The Whistlers (A European co-production)
- Zombi Child (France)

=== Non-Theatrical Releases ===
- Between Two Ferns: The Movie
- The Body Remembers When the World Broke Open
- El Camino: A Breaking Bad Movie
- Homecoming: A Film by Beyoncé
- Horror Noire: A History of Black Horror
- Little Monsters
- One Cut of the Dead
- The Perfection
- See You Yesterday
- The Wind

=== Special Achievement Awards ===
- Agencia Nacional de Cinema (Brazil) for supporting art against the attacks from a fascist government.
