= Two Days, One Night =

2014 film directed by the Dardenne brothers

- French theatrical release poster
- French: Deux jours, une nuit
- Directed by: Luc Dardenne; Jean-Pierre Dardenne
- Written by: Luc Dardenne; Jean-Pierre Dardenne
- Produced by: Luc Dardenne; Jean-Pierre Dardenne; Denis Freyd
- Starring: Marion Cotillard; Fabrizio Rongione; Christelle Cornil; Olivier Gourmet; Catherine Salée
- Cinematography: Alain Marcoen
- Edited by: Marie-Hélène Dozo
- Production companies: Les Films du Fleuve; Archipel 35; BIM Distribuzione; Eyeworks; Eurimages; France 2 Cinéma; Radio Télévision Belge Francophone; Belgacom
- Distributed by: Cinéart (Belgium); Diaphana Films (France); BIM Distribuzione (Italy)
- Release dates: 20 May 2014 (Cannes); 21 May 2014 (Belgium & France); 13 November 2014 (Italy)
- Running time: 95 minutes
- Countries: Belgium; France; Italy
- Language: French
- Budget: €7 million
- Box office: $9 million

Two Days, One Night (French: Deux jours, une nuit) is a 2014 drama film written and directed by the Dardenne brothers, starring Marion Cotillard and Fabrizio Rongione, with Christelle Cornil, Olivier Gourmet and Catherine Salée in supporting roles. The film is an international co-production between Belgium, France, and Italy, and had its world premiere at the 2014 Cannes Film Festival, where it competed for the Palme d'Or. It was released theatrically in Belgium and France on 21 May 2014, through Cinéart and Diaphana, respectively, and in Italy through BIM Distribuzione on 13 November 2014.

Both the film and Cotillard's performance received widespread critical acclaim, and the film sold over 1 million tickets in Europe and grossed $9 million worldwide on a €7 million budget, becoming the Dardenne brothers' highest-grossing film. Among its numerous accolades, the film won the Sydney Film Prize at the 2014 Sydney Film Festival, was nominated for a BAFTA Award for Best Film Not in the English Language, was nominated for two César Awards, was nominated for three European Film Awards (winning Best Actress for Cotillard), and was nominated for nine Magritte Awards (winning three, including Best Film and Best Director for Jean-Pierre and Luc Dardenne). Cotillard also won the National Society of Film Critics Award for Best Actress and the New York Film Critics Circle Award for Best Actress. Time magazine ranked Cotillard's performance in Two Days, One Night as the fourth Best Movie Performance of 2014.

Two Days, One Night was selected as Belgium's submission for the Academy Award for Best Foreign Language Film at the 87th Academy Awards, but was not selected as one of the final five nominees, though Cotillard received a Best Actress nomination for her performance in the film, making her the first actor to be nominated for an Academy Award for a Belgian film.

== Plot ==
In Seraing, an industrial town near Liège, Belgium, young wife and mother Sandra prepares to return to work at Solwal, a small solar panel factory, after a medical leave of absence for depression. During her absence, Mr. Dumont, the manager of Solwal, realizes her colleagues are able to cover her shifts by working slightly longer hours and asks them to choose between retaining Sandra's position or receiving a €1,000 bonus. On Friday evening, after Sandra hears the news and that only two of her 16 coworkers voted for her to stay, she breaks down, feeling hopeless and worthless.

Sandra's husband, Manu, works to lift her spirits and convinces her to talk to Dumont with Juliette, a coworker and friend. Sandra is too petrified to speak, but Juliette argues her case, saying some of the workers felt pressured to vote against Sandra by the factory foreman, Jean-Marc, who insinuated that one employee would be let go regardless of the vote, and Dumont agrees to allow a second, secret ballot on Monday morning.

Pushed by Juliette and Manu, Sandra reluctantly agrees to talk to each of the coworkers who voted against her over the course of the weekend and attempt to persuade seven of them to reject the bonus. She faces an uphill battle, as most of her coworkers, several of whom are immigrants, are counting on the bonus for their own families, and she discovers that some work second jobs to get by. Her resolve to continue wavers when she is met with coldness, such as when a coworker she considered a friend pretends not to be home, or anger, such as when her visit prompts an altercation between a son and father, but she is heartened by the few who support her and say they will change their vote, such as Timur, who breaks down in tears and says he is ashamed of himself, as Sandra covered for him when he broke a panel on his first day. Timur even says he will contact another worker on Sandra's behalf.

On Sunday afternoon, Sandra discovers that Jean-Marc has been calling her coworkers to convince them not to change their votes, as he is against her coming back because of her depression. She visits Anne, who says she would like to vote for Sandra, but Anne's husband interrupts and throws Sandra out. Dejected, Sandra tells Manu to take her home, where she takes an overdose of Xanax. When Anne arrives to say she will support Sandra, Sandra tells Manu about the pills, and he forces her to vomit them up. At the hospital, Sandra tells Manu that she wants to visit her last three coworkers that evening. Anne tells Sandra that she has decided to leave her husband, and Sandra offers her a place to spend the night.

Alphonse, a young African immigrant who is a contract worker at Solwal, tells Sandra that, although he would only get a €150 bonus, Jean-Marc told him to vote against Sandra to fit in with his coworkers. He says he wants to vote for Sandra, but is afraid Jean-Marc will retaliate by giving him a bad review so his contract will not get renewed.

On Monday morning, the atmosphere at Solwal is volatile. While the workers vote, Jean-Marc calls Sandra a troublemaker, but she stands up for herself. There are eight votes for Sandra—one short of a majority. She tearfully thanks those who supported her, including Alphonse, and is clearing out her locker when Dumont calls her to his office. He tells her that he has decided to give everyone the bonus and also keep her on, but Sandra's joy is short-lived, as he explains he will come up with the money by not renewing the contract of a contract worker. Not wanting to retain her job at the expense of someone else, Sandra rejects this offer and leaves. As she walks away from Solwal, she calls Manu to give him the news. After saying she will begin to look for a new job that day, she tells him, "We put up a good fight. I'm happy."

== Cast ==
- Marion Cotillard as Sandra Bya, an employee at a small solar panel factory who is recovering from a bout of depression
- Fabrizio Rongione as Manu, Sandra's husband, who works as a chef
- Catherine Salée as Juliette, Sandra's coworker and friend
- Batiste Sornin as Mr. Dumont, the manager at Solwal
- Pili Groyne as Estelle, Sandra and Manu's daughter
- Simon Caudry as Maxime, Sandra and Manu's son
- Lara Persain as Willy's wife
- Alain Eloy as Willy, Sandra's coworker
- Myriem Akheddiou as Mireille, Sandra's coworker
- Timur Magomedgadzhiev as Timur, Sandra's coworker
- Hicham Slaoui as Hicham, Sandra's coworker
- Philippe Jeusette as Yvon, Sandra's coworker and Jérôme's father
- Yohan Zimmer as Jérôme, Sandra's coworker and Yvon's son
- Christelle Cornil as Anne, Sandra's coworker
- Laurent Caron as Julien, Sandra's coworker
- Franck Laisné as Dominique, Sandra's coworker
- Serge Koto as Alphonse, a contract worker at Solwal
- Olivier Gourmet as Jean-Marc, Sandra's supervisor at Solwal

== Production ==
=== Development ===
On 25 February 2013, The Film Stage announced that Marion Cotillard would star in the Dardenne brothers' next film, Two Days, One Night, and that Fabrizio Rongione (who had previously worked with the Dardenne brothers on Rosetta (1999), L'Enfant (2005), Lorna's Silence (2008), and The Kid with a Bike (2011)) would have a supporting role as the husband of Cotillard's character. Cotillard is the most famous actor the Dardenne brothers have worked with, and the first French actor they cast as the lead in one of their films, which usually have relatively unknown Belgian actors in the cast. Jean-Pierre Dardenne said about Cotillard's casting: "hiring such a famous actress was an additional challenge for us. Marion was able to find a new body and a new face for this film." One of the Dardenne brothers' first requests for Cotillard was for her to lose her French Parisian accent, in order for her character to sound like an authentic Belgian. Cotillard said she was very happy when the Dardennes praised her Liège accent.

The Dardenne brothers were co-producers on Jacques Audiard's 2012 romantic drama film Rust and Bone, which Cotillard had starred in, and they met the actress by chance on that film's set in Belgium when she was coming out of an elevator holding her baby. During that meeting, the brothers told Cotillard about a project they were writing about a young doctor and that they would love to work with her, and she said the same to them. The brothers have said they were won over immediately, with Luc Dardenne calling their first encounter with Cotillard "a cinematic love at first sight", and saying that, "Driving back to Liège, we didn't stop talking about her: her face, her look..."

Initially, the Dardenne brothers had a different project in mind in which Cotillard would play a doctor, but that script did not come together because they had writer's block, so they decided to write a different film for her, which was a project they had originally begun about ten years earlier before setting it aside. They started working again on the script that became Two Days, One Night in October 2012, and finished writing it in March 2013.

The script was based on a story the Dardenne brothers read in a sociology book about a worker at Peugeot in France in 1998, who was fired after his boss incited his team to vote for his dismissal because he was preventing them from getting bigger bonuses. Luc Dardenne said he and his brother were also thinking of Sidney Lumet's 1957 courtroom drama film 12 Angry Men, "because it's a process of going to see people to try and change their minds".

The film was a Belgian production with French and Italian co-producers. It was produced by the Dardenne's Les Films du Fleuve, with co-production support from France's Archipel 35, Italy's BIM Distribuzione, and Belgium's Eyeworks Film & TV Drama. The film received funding from the Flemish Audiovisual Fund, RTBF, and Centre du cinéma et de l'audiovisuel, and received €500,000 from Eurimages. The total budget was seven million euros.

=== Filming ===
Following a six-week rehearsal process, filming began in late June 2013 in Seraing, Belgium and wrapped in September 2013.

The film was shot in chronological order. The Dardenne brothers required several takes for the long sequence shots. They did 56 takes for a single sequence on the second day of filming, and on the fourth day they did 82 takes. Cotillard said that she even asked for more takes herself, and that sometimes it went up to 95 or 100 takes.

== Release ==
Two Days, One Night premiered at the 2014 Cannes Film Festival on 20 May 2014. It was released theatrically in France and Belgium the next day, through Diaphana and Cinéart, respectively. The film was screened at the Sydney Film Festival on 9 June and the Munich Film Festival on 29 June, and it was the closing film of the Norwegian Film Festival on 20 August. Artificial Eye released the film in the United Kingdom on 22 August 2014.

The North American premiere of the film occurred at the Telluride Film Festival on 29 August, and it was subsequently screened at the Toronto International Film Festival on 9 September, the New York Film Festival on 5 October, the Hamptons Film Festival on 10 October, the Mill Valley Film Festival on 11 October, and the Chicago Film Festival on 16 October. It was the opening film of Valladolid Film Festival on 18 October, and it was screened at the Savannah Film Festival on 28 October and at AFI Fest on 7 November. BIM Distribuzione released the film theatrically in Italy on 13 November 2014. Sundance Selects distributed the film in the United States on 24 December 2014.

== Reception ==
=== Box office ===
Two Days, One Night sold over 520,000 tickets in France and grossed US$3,5 million at the French box office. It made US$1,4 million in the United States and US$7,5 million in other territories, with over 1 million tickets sold in Europe. The film grossed a total of US$9 million worldwide, making it the Dardenne brothers' highest-grossing film.

=== Critical response ===
Two Days, One Night received critical acclaim after its premiere at the 2014 Cannes Film Festival, where it earned a 15-minute standing ovation, with Marion Cotillard's performance earning particular praise. On the film review aggregator website Rotten Tomatoes, 97% of 185 critics' reviews of the film are positive, with an average rating of 8.4/10; the site's "critics consensus" reads: "Another profoundly affecting work from the Dardenne brothers, Two Days, One Night delivers its timely message with honesty and clear-eyed compassion." On Metacritic, the film has a weighted average score of 89 out of 100 based on reviews from 38 critics, indicating "universal acclaim".

Writing for The Guardian, Peter Bradshaw gave the film five stars out of five and praised Cotillard's "supremely intelligent performance." Empire also gave the film five out of five stars, describing it as "a rare film of unforced simplicity, with an outstanding lead performance"; the magazine later chose Two Days, One Night as one of the 50 best films of 2014, ranked at number 44. The Hollywood Reporter praised the film and stated that it stands alongside Marion Cotillard's best work.

Nicholas Barber of the BBC gave the film four stars out of five, praising Cotillard's performance by saying that "she conveys a tremendous amount with the smallest, quietest gestures. When you see the fierce, tearful grin on her face after one successful encounter, and the sleepwalking shuffle she adopts when her depression threatens to engulf her, it’s plain that she is one of the finest cinema actors we have." Emma Dibdin of Digital Spy also gave the film four stars out of five, calling Cotillard "fascinating to watch", and writing: "The physical sluggishness and emotional numbing of depression have seldom been better portrayed on screen, and yet Two Days One Night still emerges as a psychologically delving and quietly uplifting modern-day morality play." David Sims of The Atlantic wrote that Cotillard gives "a career-best performance that has run the table at critics' awards this year."

=== Industry reception ===
After seeing Cotillard's performance in Two Days, One Night at the 2014 Cannes Film Festival, American actress Julianne Moore said: "If Marion Cotillard doesn't win the Golden Globe, there is no justice." Moore said she was surprised when Cotillard did not get the nomination, adding: "I was so flabbergasted by her performance. It was so, so beautiful." Moore, who won the 2015 Academy Award for Best Actress for Still Alice (2014), later said that Cotillard deserved to win the Oscar more than she did.

In Spain, filmmaker Pedro Almodóvar made a list of the best films and performances of 2014 and included Cotillard's performance in Two Days, One Night on his list of best foreign actresses.

== Accolades ==
In June 2014, the film won the Sydney Film Prize at the Sydney Film Festival, "For its masterfully elegant storytelling, its dedication to a fiercely humanistic, super-realist worldview, its brave, essential commitment to community solidarity, and its celebration of a woman's power and vitality," according to Rachel Perkins, the president of the jury.

The National Board of Review chose the film as one of the Top 5 Foreign Films of 2014. Time magazine ranked Cotillard's performance in the film as the second best female movie performance of 2014 and the fourth best movie performance overall (shared with her performance in The Immigrant). And Variety ranked it as the 13th best performance of the year on its list of "The 59 Best Performances of 2014".

On 19 September 2014, it was announced that Two Days, One Night would be Belgium's submission for the foreign language film category at the 87th Academy Awards, but it did not make it to the December shortlist of nine films, which was described by The Hollywood Reporter's Scott Feinberg as the "most upsetting" snub to him. However, Cotillard received a Best Actress nomination for her performance, making her the first actor to be nominated for an Academy Award for a Belgian film.

Award	Category	Recipient(s)	Result	Ref(s)
Academy Awards	Best Actress	Marion Cotillard	Nominated	
British Academy Film Awards	Best Film Not in the English Language	Two Days, One Night	Nominated	
Alliance of Women Film Journalists	Best Actress	Marion Cotillard	Nominated	
Belgian Film Critics Association	André Cavens Award for Best Film	Two Days, One Night	Won	
Boston Online Film Critics Association	Best Actress	Marion Cotillard	Won	
Boston Online Film Critics Association	Best Foreign Language Film	Two Days, One Night	Won	
Boston Online Film Critics Association	Top 10 Best Films of 2014	Two Days, One Night	Won	
Boston Society of Film Critics	Best Actress	Marion Cotillard (shared with her performance in The Immigrant)	Won	
Boston Society of Film Critics	Best Foreign Language Film	Two Days, One Night	Won	
Cannes Film Festival	Palme d'Or	Jean-Pierre Dardenne and Luc Dardenne	Nominated	
César Awards	Best Actress	Marion Cotillard	Nominated	
César Awards	Best Foreign Film	Two Days, One Night	Nominated	
Chicago Film Critics Association	Best Actress	Marion Cotillard	Nominated	
Chicago Film Critics Association	Best Foreign Language Film	Two Days, One Night	Nominated	
Critics' Choice Movie Awards	Best Actress	Marion Cotillard	Nominated	
Critics' Choice Movie Awards	Best Foreign Language Film	Two Days, One Night	Nominated	
Dallas–Fort Worth Film Critics Association Awards	Best Actress	Marion Cotillard	Nominated	
Denver Film Critics Society	Best Actress	Marion Cotillard	Nominated	
Denver Film Critics Society	Best Foreign Language Film	Two Days, One Night	Won	
Dublin Film Critics' Circle Awards	Best Director	Jean-Pierre Dardenne and Luc Dardenne	Nominated	
Dublin Film Critics' Circle Awards	Best Actress	Marion Cotillard	Won	
Dublin Film Critics' Circle Awards	Top 10 Films	Two Days, One Night	7th Place	
Film Comment	Top 20 Best Films of 2014	Jean-Pierre Dardenne and Luc Dardenne	11th place	
European Film Awards	Best Screenwriter	Jean-Pierre Dardenne and Luc Dardenne	Nominated	
European Film Awards	Best Actress	Marion Cotillard	Won	
European Film Awards	People's Choice Award	Two Days, One Night	Nominated	
Georgia Film Critics Association	Best Actress	Marion Cotillard	Won	
Georgia Film Critics Association	Best Foreign Language Film	Two Days, One Night	Nominated	
Globes de Cristal Award	Best Film	Two Days, One Night	Nominated	
Globes de Cristal Award	Best Actress	Marion Cotillard	Nominated	
Guldbagge Awards	Best Foreign Film	Two Days, One Night	Won	
Hawaii International Film Festival	EuroCinema Hawai'i Award – Best Film	Two Days, One Night	Nominated	
Houston Film Critics Society	Best Actress	Marion Cotillard	Nominated	
Houston Film Critics Society	Best Foreign Language Film	Two Days, One Night	Nominated	
Indiana Film Journalists Association	Best Foreign Language Film	Two Days, One Night	Won	
Indiewire Critics' Poll	Best Actress	Marion Cotillard	Won	
International Cinephile Society Awards	Grand Prix	Two Days, One Night	Won	
London Film Critics Circle Award	Best Actress	Marion Cotillard	Nominated	
London Film Critics Circle Award	Best Foreign Language Film	Two Days, One Night	Nominated	
Lumière Awards	Best French-Language Film	Two Days, One Night	Won	
Magritte Awards	Best Film	Two Days, One Night	Won	
Magritte Awards	Best Director	Jean-Pierre Dardenne and Luc Dardenne	Won	
Magritte Awards	Best Screenplay	Jean-Pierre Dardenne and Luc Dardenne	Nominated	
Magritte Awards	Best Actor	Fabrizio Rongione	Won	
Magritte Awards	Best Supporting Actress	Christelle Cornil	Nominated	
Magritte Awards	Best Supporting Actress	Catherine Salée	Nominated	
Magritte Awards	Best Production Design	Igor Gabriel	Nominated	
Magritte Awards	Best Sound	Benoît De Clerck and Thomas Gauder	Nominated	
Magritte Awards	Best Editing	Marie-Hélène Dozo	Nominated	
Munich Film Festival	ARRI/OSRAM Award – Best International Film	Two Days, One Night	Nominated	
National Board of Review	Top 5 Foreign Films	Two Days, One Night	Won	
National Society of Film Critics Awards	Best Actress	Marion Cotillard (shared with her performance in The Immigrant)	Won	
New York Film Critics Circle	Best Actress	Marion Cotillard	Won	
North Carolina Film Critics Association	Best Actress	Marion Cotillard	Nominated	
North Carolina Film Critics Association	Best Foreign Language Film	Two Days, One Night	Nominated	
Online Film Critics Society Awards	Best Picture	Two Days, One Night	Nominated	
Online Film Critics Society Awards	Best Director	Jean-Pierre Dardenne and Luc Dardenne	Nominated	
Online Film Critics Society Awards	Best Original Screenplay	Jean-Pierre Dardenne and Luc Dardenne	Nominated	
Online Film Critics Society Awards	Best Actress	Marion Cotillard	Nominated	
Online Film Critics Society Awards	Best Foreign Language Film	Two Days, One Night	Won	
San Diego Film Critics Society Awards	Best Actress	Marion Cotillard	Won	
San Diego Film Critics Society Awards	Best Foreign Language Film	Two Days, One Night	Nominated	
San Francisco Film Critics Circle	Best Actress	Marion Cotillard	Nominated	
San Francisco Film Critics Circle	Best Foreign Language Film	Two Days, One Night	Nominated	
Satellite Awards	Best Actress in a Motion Picture	Marion Cotillard	Nominated	
Satellite Awards	Best International Film	Two Days, One Night	Nominated	
Sydney Film Festival	Sydney Film Prize	Two Days, One Night	Won	
St. Louis Gateway Film Critics Association Awards	Best Actress	Marion Cotillard	Nominated	
St. Louis Gateway Film Critics Association Awards	Best Foreign Film	Two Days, One Night	Nominated	
Valladolid Film Festival	Golden Spike - Best Film	Two Days, One Night	Nominated	
Village Voice Film Poll	Best Actress	Marion Cotillard (shared with her performance in The Immigrant)	Won	
Utah Film Critics Association	Best Actress	Marion Cotillard	Runner-up	
Utah Film Critics Association	Best Foreign Language Film	Two Days, One Night	Runner-up	
Washington D.C. Area Film Critics Association	Best Foreign Language Film	Two Days, One Night	Nominated	
Women Film Critics Circle	Best Foreign Film By or About Women	Two Days, One Night	Won	
Women Film Critics Circle	Best Movie About Women	Two Days, One Night	Nominated	
Women Film Critics Circle	Women's Work (Best Ensemble)	Two Days, One Night	Nominated	
Women Film Critics Circle	Best Actress	Marion Cotillard	Nominated	

== See also ==
- List of submissions to the 87th Academy Awards for Best Foreign Language Film
- List of Belgian submissions for the Academy Award for Best Foreign Language Film
- List of films featuring unemployment
- List of films featuring mental disorders
