= Online Film Critics Society Awards 2018 =

22nd Online Film Critics Society Awards
- Date: January 2, 2019

Highlights
- Best Picture: Roma
- Most awards: Roma (4)
- Most nominations: The Favourite (8)

The 22nd Online Film Critics Society Awards, honoring the best in film for 2018, were announced on January 2, 2019. The nominations were announced on December 26, 2018.

== Winners and nominees ==
Best Picture	Best Director
1. Roma; 2. BlacKkKlansman; 3. If Beale Street Could Talk; 4. First Reformed; 5. The Favourite; 6. You Were Never Really Here; 7. Annihilation; 8. Eighth Grade; 9. Hereditary; 10. A Star Is Born; 11. Suspiria	Alfonso Cuarón – Roma; Barry Jenkins – If Beale Street Could Talk; Yorgos Lanthimos – The Favourite; Spike Lee – BlacKkKlansman; Lynne Ramsay – You Were Never Really Here
Best Actor	Best Actress
Ethan Hawke – First Reformed; Christian Bale – Vice; Bradley Cooper – A Star Is Born; Joaquin Phoenix – You Were Never Really Here; John David Washington – BlacKkKlansman	Toni Collette – Hereditary; Yalitza Aparicio – Roma; Olivia Colman – The Favourite; Regina Hall – Support the Girls; Lady Gaga – A Star Is Born
Best Supporting Actor	Best Supporting Actress
Michael B. Jordan – Black Panther; Mahershala Ali – Green Book; Adam Driver – BlacKkKlansman; Richard E. Grant – Can You Ever Forgive Me?; Steven Yeun – Burning	Regina King – If Beale Street Could Talk; Elizabeth Debicki – Widows; Thomasin McKenzie – Leave No Trace; Emma Stone – The Favourite; Rachel Weisz – The Favourite
Best Animated Feature	Best Film Not in the English Language
Spider-Man: Into the Spider-Verse; Incredibles 2; Isle of Dogs; Mirai; Ralph Breaks the Internet	Roma (Mexico); Burning (South Korea); Cold War (Poland); Shoplifters (Japan); Zama (Argentina)
Best Documentary	Best Debut Feature
Won't You Be My Neighbor?; Free Solo; Minding the Gap; Shirkers; Three Identical Strangers	Ari Aster – Hereditary; Bo Burnham – Eighth Grade; Bradley Cooper – A Star Is Born; Carlos López Estrada – Blindspotting; Boots Riley – Sorry to Bother You
Best Original Screenplay	Best Adapted Screenplay
Paul Schrader – First Reformed; Bo Burnham – Eighth Grade; Deborah Davis and Tony McNamara – The Favourite; Alfonso Cuarón – Roma; Boots Riley – Sorry to Bother You	Barry Jenkins – If Beale Street Could Talk; Charlie Wachtel, David Rabinowitz, Kevin Willmott, and Spike Lee – BlacKkKlansman; Nicole Holofcener and Jeff Whitty – Can You Ever Forgive Me?; Debra Granik and Anne Rosellini – Leave No Trace; Gillian Flynn and Steve McQueen – Widows
Best Editing	Best Cinematography
Eddie Hamilton – Mission: Impossible – Fallout; Yorgos Mavropsaridis – The Favourite; Tom Cross – First Man; Alfonso Cuarón and Adam Gough – Roma; Joe Walker – Widows	Alfonso Cuarón – Roma; Łukasz Żal – Cold War; Robbie Ryan – The Favourite; Linus Sandgren – First Man; James Laxton – If Beale Street Could Talk
Best Original Score
Nicholas Britell – If Beale Street Could Talk; Ludwig Göransson – Black Panther; Justin Hurwitz – First Man; Alexandre Desplat – Isle of Dogs; Thom Yorke – Suspiria

== Special awards ==
=== Technical Achievement Awards ===
- Annihilation – Best Visual Effects
- Black Panther – Best Costume Design
- Mission: Impossible – Fallout – Best Stunt Coordination
- A Quiet Place – Best Sound Design
- A Star Is Born – Best Original Songs

=== Lifetime Achievement Awards ===
- Roger Deakins
- Spike Lee
- Rita Moreno
- Robert Redford
- Agnès Varda

=== Special Achievement Awards ===
- Ryan Coogler for Black Panther's distinctive critical and box office appeal.
- The city of Oakland, California, for hosting 2018's most socially and artistically compelling films about racism, Sorry to Bother You and Blindspotting

== Films with multiple nominations and awards ==
Films that received multiple nominations
Nominations	Film
8	The Favourite
7	Roma
6	If Beale Street Could Talk
5	BlacKkKlansman
4	A Star Is Born
3	Eighth Grade
3	First Man
3	First Reformed
3	Hereditary
3	Widows
3	You Were Never Really Here
2	Black Panther
2	Burning
2	Can You Ever Forgive Me?
2	Cold War
2	Isle of Dogs
2	Leave No Trace
2	Sorry to Bother You
2	Suspiria

Films that received multiple awards
Awards	Film
4	Roma
3	If Beale Street Could Talk
2	First Reformed
2	Hereditary
