= Online Film Critics Society Awards 2015 =

19th Online Film Critics Society Awards

19th Online Film Critics Society Awards
- Date: December 14, 2015

Highlights
- Most awards: 4 (Mad Max: Fury Road)
- Most nominations: 6 (Carol, Sicario)

The 19th Online Film Critics Society Awards, honoring the best in film for 2015, were announced on December 7, 2015. The winners were announced on December 14, 2015.

== Nominees ==
Best Picture	Best Director
Mad Max: Fury Road; Brooklyn; Carol; Ex Machina; Inside Out; The Martian; The Revenant; Room; Sicario; Spotlight	George Miller – Mad Max: Fury Road; Todd Haynes – Carol; Tom McCarthy – Spotlight; Ridley Scott – The Martian; Denis Villeneuve – Sicario
Best Actor	Best Actress
Michael Fassbender – Steve Jobs; Matt Damon – The Martian; Leonardo DiCaprio – The Revenant; Michael B. Jordan – Creed; Ian McKellen – Mr. Holmes	Cate Blanchett – Carol; Brie Larson – Room; Charlotte Rampling – 45 Years; Saoirse Ronan – Brooklyn; Charlize Theron – Mad Max: Fury Road
Best Supporting Actor	Best Supporting Actress
Oscar Isaac – Ex Machina; Benicio del Toro – Sicario; Mark Ruffalo – Spotlight; Mark Rylance – Bridge of Spies; Sylvester Stallone – Creed	Rooney Mara – Carol; Cynthia Nixon – James White; Kristen Stewart – Clouds of Sils Maria; Alicia Vikander – The Danish Girl; Kate Winslet – Steve Jobs
Best Animated Feature	Best Film Not in the English Language
Inside Out; Anomalisa; The Good Dinosaur; The Peanuts Movie; Shaun the Sheep Movie	The Assassin; Goodnight Mommy; Mustang; Phoenix; Son of Saul
Best Documentary	Best Non-U.S. Release (non-competitive category)
The Look of Silence; Amy; Best of Enemies; Cartel Land; Going Clear	Aferim!; Cemetery of Splendour; The Club; Dheepan; The Lobster; Mia Madre; Mountains May Depart; Rams; Right Now, Wrong Then; Sunset Song
Best Adapted Screenplay	Best Original Screenplay
Carol; Brooklyn; The Martian; Room; Steve Jobs	Spotlight; Ex Machina; Inside Out; Mistress America; Sicario
Best Editing	Best Cinematography
Mad Max: Fury Road; The Martian; The Revenant; Sicario; Steve Jobs	Mad Max: Fury Road; The Assassin; Carol; The Revenant; Sicario
