= Online Film Critics Society Awards 1998 =

2nd Online Film Critics Society Awards

2nd Online Film Critics Society Awards

January 3, 1999

Best Film:
Saving Private Ryan

The 2nd Online Film Critics Society Awards, honoring the best in film for 1998, were given on 3 January 1999. They were organized by the Online Film Critics Society.

== Winners and nominees ==
| Best Picture Saving Private Ryan: Life Is Beautiful; The Truman Show | Best Director Steven Spielberg — Saving Private Ryan: Peter Weir — The Truman Show; Terrence Malick — The Thin Red Line |
| Best Actor Ian McKellen — Gods and Monsters as James Whale: Edward Norton — American History X as Derek Vinyard; Tom Hanks — Saving Private Ryan as Captain John Miller | Best Actress Cate Blanchett — Elizabeth as Elizabeth I: Emily Watson — Hilary and Jackie as Jacqueline du Pré; Gwyneth Paltrow — Shakespeare in Love as Viola de Lesseps |
| Best Supporting Actor Billy Bob Thornton — A Simple Plan as Jacob Mitchell: Ed Harris — The Truman Show as Christof; Jason Patric — Your Friends & Neighbors as Cary | Best Supporting Actress Joan Allen — Pleasantville as Betty Parker: Kathy Bates — Primary Colors as Libby Holden; Lisa Kudrow — The Opposite of Sex as Lucia De Lury |
| Best Original Screenplay The Truman Show — Andrew Niccol: Happiness — Todd Solondz; Shakespeare in Love — Marc Norman and Tom Stoppard | Best Adapted Screenplay Out of Sight — Scott Frank: Primary Colors — Elaine May; A Simple Plan — Scott Smith |
| Best Foreign Language Film Life Is Beautiful • Italy — Roberto Benigni: Festen • Denmark — Thomas Vinterberg; Central Station • Brazil — Walter Salles | Best Documentary Film The Big One — Michael Moore: The Cruise — Bennett Miller; Wild Man Blues — Barbara Kopple |
| Best Cinematography Saving Private Ryan — Janusz Kamiński: Pleasantville — John Lindley; The Thin Red Line — John Toll | Best Editing Saving Private Ryan — Michael Kahn: Out of Sight — Anne V. Coates; Pleasantville — William Goldenberg; The Truman Show — Lee Smith and William M. Anderson |
| Best Original Score Pleasantville — Randy Newman: The Prince of Egypt — Hans Zimmer; Saving Private Ryan — John Williams | Best Ensemble Saving Private Ryan: Happiness; Your Friends & Neighbors |
