= Online Film Critics Society Awards 1997 =

1st Online Film Critics Society Awards

1st Online Film Critics Society Awards
- Presented on: January 11, 1998

Highlights
- Best Picture: L.A. Confidential

The 1st Online Film Critics Society Awards, honoring the best in film for 1997, were given on 11 January 1998.

== Winners and nominees ==
Best Picture L.A. Confidential: The Sweet Hereafter; Titanic	Best Director James Cameron — Titanic: Curtis Hanson — L.A. Confidential; Paul Thomas Anderson — Boogie Nights
Best Actor Jack Nicholson — As Good as It Gets as Melvin Udall: Ian Holm — The Sweet Hereafter as Mitchell Stephens; Peter Fonda — Ulee's Gold as Ulee Jackson	Best Actress Judi Dench — Mrs Brown as Queen Victoria: Helena Bonham Carter — The Wings of the Dove as Kate Croy; Kate Winslet — Titanic as Rose DeWitt Bukater
Best Supporting Actor Burt Reynolds — Boogie Nights as Jack Horner: Anthony Hopkins — Amistad as John Quincy Adams; Rupert Everett — My Best Friend's Wedding as George Downes	Best Supporting Actress Gloria Stuart — Titanic as Rose Dowson Calvert: Joan Cusack — Grosse Pointe Blank as Marcella; Julianne Moore — The Myth of Fingerprints as Mia
Best Screenplay L.A. Confidential — Brian Helgeland and Curtis Hanson: Boogie Nights — Paul Thomas Anderson; Good Will Hunting — Ben Affleck and Matt Damon	Best Foreign Language Film Shall We Dance? • Japan — Masayuki Suo: La Promesse • Belgium — Jean-Pierre Dardenne and Luc Dardenne; Ponette • France — Jacques Doillon
Best Documentary Film 4 Little Girls — Spike Lee: Fast, Cheap & Out of Control — Errol Morris; Sick: The Life and Death of Bob Flanagan, Supermasochist — Kirby Dick	
