= Online Film Critics Society Awards 2012 =

16th Online Film Critics Society Awards

16th Online Film Critics Society Awards

2013

Best Picture:
Argo

The nominations for the 16th Online Film Critics Society Awards, honoring the best in film for 2012, were announced on 24 December 2012. The winners were announced on Monday, December 31.

== Winners and nominees ==
=== Best Picture ===
Argo

- Holy Motors
- The Master
- Moonrise Kingdom
- Zero Dark Thirty

=== Best Director ===
Paul Thomas Anderson – The Master

- Ben Affleck – Argo
- Wes Anderson – Moonrise Kingdom
- Kathryn Bigelow – Zero Dark Thirty
- Leos Carax – Holy Motors

=== Best Actor ===
Daniel Day-Lewis – Lincoln

- John Hawkes – The Sessions
- Denis Lavant – Holy Motors
- Joaquin Phoenix – The Master
- Denzel Washington – Flight

=== Best Actress ===
Jessica Chastain – Zero Dark Thirty

- Jennifer Lawrence – Silver Linings Playbook
- Emmanuelle Riva – Amour
- Quvenzhané Wallis – Beasts of the Southern Wild
- Rachel Weisz – The Deep Blue Sea

=== Best Supporting Actor ===
Philip Seymour Hoffman – The Master

- Alan Arkin – Argo
- Dwight Henry – Beasts of the Southern Wild
- Tommy Lee Jones – Lincoln
- Christoph Waltz – Django Unchained

=== Best Supporting Actress ===
Anne Hathaway – Les Misérables

- Amy Adams – The Master
- Ann Dowd – Compliance
- Sally Field – Lincoln
- Helen Hunt – The Sessions

=== Best Original Screenplay ===
Moonrise Kingdom – Wes Anderson & Roman Coppola

- The Cabin in the Woods – Joss Whedon & Drew Goddard
- Looper – Rian Johnson
- The Master – Paul Thomas Anderson
- Zero Dark Thirty – Mark Boal

=== Best Adapted Screenplay ===
Argo – Chris Terrio

- Beasts of the Southern Wild – Lucy Alibar & Benh Zeitlin
- Cloud Atlas – Lana Wachowski, Tom Tykwer & Andy Wachowski
- Cosmopolis – David Cronenberg
- Lincoln – Tony Kushner

=== Best Foreign Language Film ===
Holy Motors

- Amour
- Rust and Bone
- This Is Not a Film
- The Turin Horse

=== Best Documentary ===
This Is Not a Film

- The Imposter
- The Invisible War
- Jiro Dreams of Sushi
- The Queen of Versailles

=== Best Animated Feature ===
ParaNorman

- Brave
- Frankenweenie
- The Secret World of Arrietty
- Wreck-It Ralph

=== Best Cinematography ===
Skyfall – Roger Deakins

- Life of Pi – Claudio Miranda
- Lincoln – Janusz Kamiński
- The Master – Mihai Mălaimare Jr.
- Moonrise Kingdom – Robert Yeoman

=== Best Editing ===
Cloud Atlas – Alexander Berner

- Argo – William Goldenberg
- The Master – Leslie Jones and Peter McNulty
- Skyfall – Stuart Baird
- Zero Dark Thirty – William Goldenberg and Dylan Tichenor
