= Monster's Ball =

2001 film by Marc Forster

- Theatrical release poster
- Directed by: Marc Forster
- Written by: Milo Addica; Will Rokos
- Produced by: Lee Daniels
- Starring: Billy Bob Thornton; Heath Ledger; Halle Berry; Sean Combs; Mos Def; Peter Boyle
- Cinematography: Roberto Schaefer
- Edited by: Matt Chesse
- Music by: Asche and Spencer
- Production company: Lee Daniels Entertainment
- Distributed by: Lions Gate Films
- Release dates: November 11, 2001 (AFI Fest); December 26, 2001 (Los Angeles and New York City); February 8, 2002 (United States)
- Running time: 111 minutes 112 minutes (Unrated)
- Country: United States
- Language: English
- Budget: $4 million
- Box office: $45 million

Monster's Ball is a 2001 American independent Southern Gothic romantic drama film directed by Marc Forster, produced by Lee Daniels and written by Milo Addica and Will Rokos, who also appeared in the film. It stars Billy Bob Thornton, Heath Ledger, Halle Berry, and Peter Boyle, with Sean Combs, Mos Def, and Coronji Calhoun in supporting roles.

Thornton portrays a corrections officer who begins a relationship with a woman (Berry), unaware that she is the widow of a man (Combs) he assisted in executing. Principal photography began in May 2001 in New Orleans, Louisiana and lasted for five weeks.

Monster's Ball premiered at AFI Fest on November 11, 2001, and was theatrically released in the United States on February 8, 2002, by Lionsgate Films. The film received positive reviews from critics, who praised the performances (particularly Berry's), Forster's direction, and Addica and Rokos' screenplay. It was also a significant commercial success, grossing $45 million worldwide on a production budget of $4 million.

The film received numerous accolades and nominations, and was nominated twice at the 74th Academy Awards for Best Actress (Berry) and Original Screenplay (Addica and Rokos), with Berry winning for her performance, becoming the first African American woman to win the award.

== Plot ==
Hank Grotowski, a widower, and his son, Sonny, are corrections officers in a Georgia (Note: The location is never directly mentioned in dialog, although Clement's gas station has a "Georgia Is Peachy" sign in its window. In the script, the location of the prison is referenced as being in Georgia, which is evident from the shoulder patches reading "G.S.P." on prison guard's uniforms (likely meaning Georgia State Prison). Some scenes erroneously depict the uniforms as having Louisiana-shaped patches (similar to actual Louisiana prison guards) alongside the "G.S.P." patches, likely as a result of the filming location being in Louisiana.) prison. They reside with Hank's father, Buck, an ailing, racist retired corrections officer whose wife had taken their own life. When Willie and Darryl Cooper, friends of Sonny's who are Black, come by the house, Hank frightens them off with a shotgun at the behest of Buck.

Hank is the prison's deputy warden, whose work is to oversee the execution of convicted murderer Lawrence Musgrove. Musgrove is visited by his wife Leticia and son Tyrell before his execution. While at home, overwhelmed by her husband's impending death as well as numerous personal and financial difficulties, Leticia lashes out at her boy for his obesity, resorting to physical and emotional abuse. The night before the execution, Hank tells Sonny that a "monster's ball" is held by the corrections officers, a get-together of those who will participate in the execution. While Musgrove waits to be taken to the chair, he draws a sketch of Sonny and Hank. The proceedings prove too much for Sonny, who, while leading Lawrence to the electric chair, vomits and then collapses. Following the execution, Hank confronts Sonny in the prison's bathroom and assaults him for ruining Musgrove's last walk.

The next morning, Hank attacks Sonny in his bed and orders him to leave the house. Sonny grabs a revolver from under his pillow and holds his father at gunpoint. The confrontation ends in their living room with Sonny asking if his father hates him. After Hank confirms that he does and always has, Sonny takes his own life by shooting himself in the chest after stating that he always loved Hank. A shocked, ashamed, and devastated Hank buries Sonny in the back garden. He subsequently resigns as deputy warden, burns his uniform in the backyard, and locks the door of Sonny's room. He later purchases Clement's gas station in an attempt to provide a distraction in his retirement. The Coopers offer condolences to Hank, which he accepts.

One rainy night, Hank is driving and sees Tyrell lying on the ground by the side of the road, with Leticia calling for help. After some hesitation, Hank stops. Leticia claims that Tyrell was struck by a car; Hank drives them to a hospital, where Tyrell dies from his injuries. At the suggestion of the authorities at the hospital, Hank drives Leticia to her home, where she appears distressed by the fact that the police are going to have an autopsy conducted on her son to confirm his cause of death. A few days later, Hank gives Leticia a ride home from the diner where she works. They begin talking in the car about their common losses, and she invites him in. Hank finds out that Leticia is Lawrence's widow, though he does not tell her that he participated in her husband's execution. They drown their grief with alcohol and have aggressive sex.

Hank eventually offers to give Leticia Sonny's truck, which had been fixed up by the Coopers and their father, Ryrus. She finally accepts after initial discomfort. When Leticia stops by Hank's home with a present for him, she meets Buck, who insults her and implies that Hank is only involved with her because he enjoys sex with Black women. Leticia, offended by the remarks, refuses to interact with Hank. After Hank is made aware of Buck's actions, he finally stands up to his father and commits him to a nursing home. He then renames the gas station Leticia's, and when asked he replies that it is his girlfriend's name.

Leticia is evicted from her home and Hank invites her to move in with him. While he is out, she discovers Lawrence's drawings of Sonny and Hank, discovering Hank's involvement in her husband's death. She is angered at first by the revelation, but numbed by her suffering, she stays. The film ends with the two of them eating ice cream together on the back porch as Hank states that he thinks they'll be okay.

== Cast ==
- Billy Bob Thornton as Hank Grotowski
- Heath Ledger as Sonny Grotowski
- Halle Berry as Leticia Musgrove
- Sean Combs as Lawrence Musgrove
- Mos Def as Ryrus Cooper
- Coronji Calhoun as Tyrell Musgrove
- Peter Boyle as Buck Grotowski

== Production ==
=== Development ===
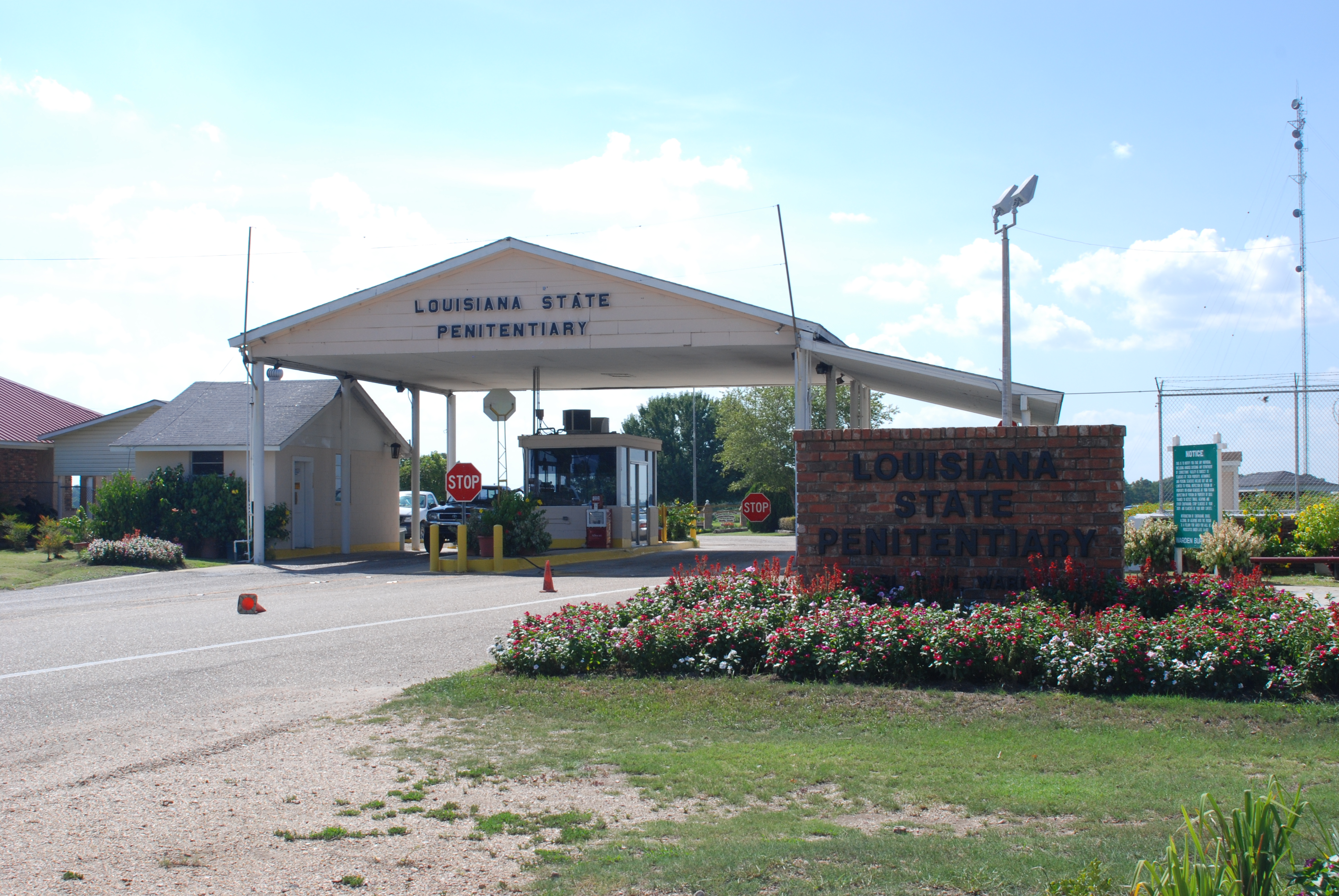
Louisiana State Penitentiary served as a filming location.

The basis for this film came from the desire of actors-turned-writers Addica and Rokos to make a script that would interest a big star alongside themselves with Harvey Keitel in mind since he liked the latter's writing when offered one of their scripts. They were inspired by their troubled relationships with their fathers as a starting point that eventually led to a generational tale about executioners, which eventually led to the inspiration for the title (an old term for the last meal of a condemned man and a "ball" that took place with his jailers the night before). They wrote the script over a period of eight months in 1995, which led to some interest from a producer of a film Rokos had previously acted in. Years of development occurred due to interest from filmmakers ranging from Robert De Niro to Oliver Stone along with studios that wanted a lighter ending, but the transition to Lee Daniels and Lionsgate led to interest back to the original ending. The film was produced by Lionsgate and Lee Daniels Entertainment, the first production for the latter. Before Halle Berry was cast as Leticia, Angela Bassett and Vanessa Williams were sought, but both of them declined. Wes Bentley turned down the part of Sonny, which eventually went to Heath Ledger. The role of Tyrell went to ten-year-old actor Coronji Calhoun. Calhoun died in November 2021, and both Berry and Daniels contributed financial assistance to Calhoun's funeral.

=== Filming ===
Principal photography began in May 2001 in New Orleans, Louisiana and lasted for five weeks. A week before production, Sean Combs auditioned for the role of Lawrence Musgrove, and won it. At one point, the production moved to the fields, cellblocks and death houses of Louisiana State Penitentiary for a week to shoot prison interiors and exteriors, with some scenes shot in the LSP execution room.

== Reception ==
On review aggregator website Rotten Tomatoes, the film has an approval rating of 85% based on 142 reviews, with an average rating of 7.3/10. The site's critical consensus states, "Somber and thought provoking, Monster's Ball has great performances all around." Metacritic, which uses a weighted average, assigned the film a score of 69 out of 100, based on 32 critics, indicating "generally favorable" reviews.

Roger Ebert gave the film four stars and rated it as the best film of 2001, stating that it "has the complexity of great fiction". Ebert also praised the performances of Berry and Thornton, saying, "[Thornton] and [Berry] star as Hank and Leticia, in two performances that are so powerful because they observe the specific natures of these two characters, and avoid the pitfalls of racial cliches. What a shock to find these two characters freed from the conventions of political correctness, and allowed to be who they are: weak, flawed, needful, with good hearts tested by lifetimes of compromise." Of the screenplay, Ebert wrote, "The screenplay by [Addica] and [Rokos] is subtle and observant; one is reminded of short fiction by Andre Dubus, William Trevor, Eudora Welty, Raymond Carver. It specifically does not tell "their" story, but focuses on two separate lives. The characters are given equal weight, and have individual story arcs, which do not intersect but simply, inevitably, meet."

Ben Falk of BBC.com spoke highly of Berry's and Thornton's performances, writing, "This is by far Berry's best-ever performance and Thornton reminds us that there are few, if any, leading men who can convey sadness and hope almost simultaneously in just one minimal glance."

=== Accolades ===
Award	Category	Recipient	Result	Ref.
Academy Awards	Best Actress	Halle Berry	Won	
Academy Awards	Best Screenplay – Written Directly for the Screen	Milo Addica and Will Rokos	Nominated	
American Film Institute Awards	Movie of the Year		Nominated	
American Film Institute Awards	Actor of the Year – Female – Movies	Halle Berry	Nominated	
American Screenwriters Association Awards	Discover Screenwriting Award	Milo Addica	Won	
Awards Circuit Community Awards	Best Actress in a Leading Role	Halle Berry	Nominated	
Bambi Awards	Best Film – International	Halle Berry	Won	
Berlin International Film Festival	Golden Bear	Marc Forster	Nominated	
Berlin International Film Festival	Best Actress	Halle Berry	Won	
BET Awards	Best Actress	Halle Berry (also for Swordfish)	Won	
Black Reel Awards	Best Actress	Halle Berry	Won	
British Academy Film Awards	Best Actress in a Leading Role	Halle Berry	Nominated	
Chicago Film Critics Association Awards	Best Actress	Halle Berry	Nominated	
Dallas–Fort Worth Film Critics Association Awards	Best Actress	Halle Berry	Nominated	
Film Critics Circle of Australia Awards	Best Foreign Film – English Language		Nominated	
Florida Film Critics Circle Awards	Best Actor	Billy Bob Thornton (also for Bandits and The Man Who Wasn't There)	Won	
Golden Globe Awards	Best Actress in a Motion Picture – Drama	Halle Berry	Nominated	
Independent Spirit Awards	Best Screenplay	Milo Addica and Will Rokos	Nominated	
Japan Academy Film Prize	Outstanding Foreign Language Film		Won	
Jupiter Awards	Best International Actress	Halle Berry	Won	
London Film Critics Circle Awards	Actress of the Year	Halle Berry	Nominated	
MTV Movie Awards	Best Female Performance	Halle Berry	Nominated	
National Board of Review Awards	Top Ten Films		5th Place	
National Board of Review Awards	Best Actor	Billy Bob Thornton (also for Bandits and The Man Who Wasn't There)	Won	
National Board of Review Awards	Best Actress	Halle Berry	Won	
Online Film & Television Association Awards	Best Actress	Halle Berry	Nominated	
Phoenix Film Critics Society Awards	Best Actress in a Leading Role	Halle Berry	Won	
Phoenix Film Critics Society Awards	Best Screenplay – Original	Milo Addica and Will Rokos	Nominated	
Robert Awards	Best American Film	Marc Forster	Nominated	
Satellite Awards	Best Actor in a Motion Picture – Drama	Billy Bob Thornton	Nominated	
Satellite Awards	Best Actress in a Motion Picture – Drama	Halle Berry	Nominated	
Satellite Awards	Best Screenplay – Original	Milo Addica and Will Rokos	Won	
Screen Actors Guild Awards	Outstanding Actress in a Leading Role	Halle Berry	Won	
Southeastern Film Critics Association Awards	Best Picture		10th Place	
Southeastern Film Critics Association Awards	Best Actress	Halle Berry	Nominated	
Turkish Film Critics Association Awards	Best Foreign Film		16th Place	
Writers Guild of America Awards	Best Screenplay – Written Directly for the Screen	Milo Addica and Will Rokos	Nominated	
