= The Deep End (film) =

2001 film by McGehee and Siegel

- Theatrical release poster
- Directed by: Scott McGehee; David Siegel
- Written by: Scott McGehee; David Siegel
- Based on: The Blank Wall by Elisabeth Sanxay Holding
- Produced by: Scott McGehee; David Siegel
- Starring: Tilda Swinton; Goran Višnjić; Jonathan Tucker; Josh Lucas
- Cinematography: Giles Nuttgens
- Music by: Peter Nashel
- Distributed by: Fox Searchlight Pictures
- Release dates: January 21, 2001 (Sundance); August 8, 2001 (United States)
- Running time: 101 minutes
- Country: United States
- Language: English
- Budget: $3 million
- Box office: $10 million

The Deep End is a 2001 American thriller film written, directed, and produced by Scott McGehee and David Siegel. It stars Tilda Swinton, Goran Visnjic, Jonathan Tucker, and Josh Lucas and was released by Fox Searchlight Pictures. The film was very loosely adapted from the novel The Blank Wall by Elisabeth Sanxay Holding (filmed in 1949 by Max Ophüls as The Reckless Moment). The film premiered in competition at the Sundance Film Festival where English cinematographer Giles Nuttgens won the Best Cinematography award.

== Plot ==
Margaret Hall and her family live an upper middle class life in Lake Tahoe, California. She herself runs the household, which includes her three children and elderly father-in-law, as her Navy pilot husband is away on the aircraft carrier USS Constellation. One day, she is startled to discover that her son Beau, a high school senior, has been having a sexual affair with 30-year-old Reno, Nevada, nightclub owner Darby Reese. Margaret visits Reese's nightclub, The Deep End, to demand that he stay away from her son. Reese demands $5,000 from her in exchange. That night, a drunken Reese secretly visits Beau and the two meet in the boathouse. Beau confronts him about asking his mother for money. The two argue, eventually coming to blows. As Beau returns to the house, Reese leans on a railing, causing it to collapse. He falls into the water, impaling himself on an anchor.

The next morning, Margaret discovers Reese's body on the beach. Believing that her son killed Reese, Margaret hides the body to protect Beau. She removes the body and dumps it in a cove, but police soon discover the body and investigate the case as a homicide. Soon after, a man named Alek Spera confronts Margaret with a tape of Darby and Beau having sex. Alek demands $50,000 in 24 hours or he will turn the tape over to the police, which would implicate Beau as a suspect.

To get the money, Margaret goes to the bank and sells her jewelry at a pawn shop, but she is unsuccessful in coming up with the full amount. Alek calls Margaret the next day and tells her that she needs to get only $25,000 but Alek's partner, Nagle, is convinced she is lying about not being able to raise the money. Nagle corners and beats Margaret but Alek arrives and the two men scuffle, resulting in Alek strangling Nagle. Margaret attempts to take responsibility for Nagle's death, but Alek takes the body away in Nagle's car. As Margaret and her son drive looking for Nagle's car, they see it overturned in a ditch. Margaret attempts to free Alek, who is critically injured. Alek pleads with her to leave before the police arrive. Margaret stays until Alek dies.

Back at home, Margaret, in a state of distress, is comforted by Beau. Another phone call is heard coming in from the absent husband, answered by Beau's sister. The Halls' normal life resumes.

== Cast ==
- Tilda Swinton as Margaret Hall
- Goran Višnjić as Alek Spera
- Jonathan Tucker as Beau Hall
- Peter Donat as Jack Hall
- Josh Lucas as Darby Reese
- Raymond J. Barry as Carlie Nagle
- Tamara Hope as Paige Hall
- Jordon Dorrance as Dylan Hall
- Holmes Osborne as Loan Officer

== Production ==
The film was shot on location in North Lake Tahoe area, including Kings Beach, Crystal Bay and Incline Village.

== Reception ==
The Deep End received positive reviews from critics. On the review aggregator website Rotten Tomatoes, 82% of 118 critics' reviews are positive, with an average rating of 7.2/10. The website's consensus reads: "A well-acted film noir with arresting visuals." Metacritic, which uses a weighted average, assigned the film a score of 78 out of 100, based on 27 critics, indicating "generally favorable" reviews.

Tilda Swinton's performance was widely praised. Roger Ebert wrote The Deep End "is the kind of crime movie where the everyday surroundings make the violence seem all the more shocking and gruesome". In The New York Times, Elvis Mitchell said the film "is fastidious and smart, and Ms. Swinton's fixated intensity isn't ever remote; we're always aware of how deeply she's feeling. Her work is magnificent, an actress burrowing inside herself to play a woman doing the most horrible thing in the world to restore order to her life". Stephanie Zacharek of Salon commented "Visnjic adds gradual layers to his performance; its depth and resonance smolder like glowing charcoal", and praised the film's visuals, cinematography, and use of noir elements. She concluded The Deep End "is completely modern-feeling, all cool and no camp, but it's still refreshingly unapologetic about the way it taps into those secret moviegoing parts of us".

== Awards and nominations ==
Award	Category	Nominee(s)	Result
Boston Society of Film Critics Awards	Best Actress	Tilda Swinton	Won
Casting Society of America Awards	Best Casting for Feature Film, Independent	Mindy Marin	Nominated
Chicago Film Critics Association Awards	Best Actress	Tilda Swinton	Nominated
Dallas-Fort Worth Film Critics Association Awards	Best Actress	Tilda Swinton	Nominated
Deauville Film Festival	Grand Special Prize	Scott McGehee	Nominated
Golden Globe Awards	Best Performance by an Actress in a Motion Picture - Drama	Tilda Swinton	Nominated
Satellite Awards	Best Performance by an Actress in a Motion Picture, Drama	Tilda Swinton	Nominated
Satellite Awards	Best Performance by an Actor in a Motion Picture, Drama	Goran Višnjić	Nominated
Satellite Awards	Best Motion Picture, Drama		Nominated
Satellite Awards	Best Director	Scott McGehee, David Siegel	Nominated
Independent Spirit Awards	Best Female Lead	Tilda Swinton	Nominated
Independent Spirit Awards	Best Cinematography	Giles Nuttgens	Nominated
Las Vegas Film Critics Society Awards	Best Actress	Tilda Swinton	Won
National Board of Review Awards	Special Recognition for excellence in filmmaking		Won
New York Film Critics Circle Awards	Best Actress	Tilda Swinton	Nominated
Online Film Critics Society Awards	Best Actress		Nominated
Sundance Film Festival	Best Cinematography - Drama	Giles Nuttgens	Won
Sundance Film Festival	Grand Jury Prize - Dramatic	Scott McGehee, David Siegel	Nominated
Toronto Film Critics Association Awards	Best Performance, Female	Tilda Swinton	Nominated
