= National Board of Review Awards 2001 =

Annual US film awards ceremony

73rd NBR Awards

December 5, 2001

Best Film:
Moulin Rouge!

The 73rd National Board of Review Awards, honoring the best in filmmaking in 2001, were announced on 5 December 2001 and given on 7 January 2002.

== Top 10 films ==
1. Moulin Rouge!
2. In the Bedroom
3. Ocean's Eleven
4. Memento
5. Monster's Ball
6. Black Hawk Down
7. The Man Who Wasn't There
8. A.I. Artificial Intelligence
9. The Pledge
10. Mulholland Drive

== Top Foreign Films ==
1. Amores perros
2. Behind the Sun
3. Dark Blue World
4. No Man's Land
5. Amélie

== Winners ==
- Best Film:
  - Moulin Rouge!
- Best Foreign Language Film:
  - Amores perros, Mexico
- Best Actor:
  - Billy Bob Thornton – The Man Who Wasn't There, Monster's Ball, Bandits
- Best Actress:
  - Halle Berry – Monster's Ball
- Best Supporting Actor:
  - Jim Broadbent – Iris and Moulin Rouge!
- Best Supporting Actress:
  - Cate Blanchett – The Lord of the Rings: The Fellowship of the Ring, The Man Who Cried, and The Shipping News
- Best Acting by an Ensemble:
  - Last Orders
- Breakthrough Performance – Male:
  - Hayden Christensen – Life as a House
- Breakthrough Performance – Female:
  - Naomi Watts – Mulholland Drive
- Best Director:
  - Todd Field – In the Bedroom
- Outstanding Directorial Debut:
  - John Cameron Mitchell – Hedwig and the Angry Inch
- Best Screenplay:
  - In the Bedroom – Robert Festinger and Todd Field
- Best Documentary Feature:
  - The Endurance: Shackleton's Legendary Antarctic Expedition
- Best Animated Feature:
  - Shrek
- Best Film made for Cable TV:
  - Wit
- Career Achievement Award:
  - Jon Voight
- Billy Wilder Award For Excellence In Directing:
  - Steven Spielberg
- Special Filmmaking Achievement:
  - Peter Jackson – The Lord of the Rings: The Fellowship of the Ring
- Best Art Direction:
  - Grant Major – The Lord of the Rings: The Fellowship of the Ring
- Career Achievement – Music Composition:
  - John Williams
- Humanitarian Award:
  - Arthur Cohn
- William K. Everson Award For Film History:
  - Martin Scorsese, My Voyage to Italy
- Freedom Of Expression:
  - Baran
  - Jung in the Land of the Mujaheddin
  - Kandahar
- Special Recognition For Excellence In Filmmaking:
  - The Anniversary Party
  - The Deep End
  - Diamond Men
  - Ghost World
  - Happy Accidents
  - Iris
  - Lantana
  - L.I.E.
  - Piñero
  - Sexy Beast
