= Online Film Critics Society Awards 2001 =

5th Online Film Critics Society Awards

5th Online Film Critics Society Awards

January 2, 2002

Best Film:
Memento
Mulholland Drive

The 5th Online Film Critics Society Awards, honoring the best in filmmaking in 2001, were given on 2 January 2002.

== Top 10 films ==
1. Memento (tied for 1st place with Mulholland Drive)
2. Mulholland Drive (tied for 1st place with Memento)
3. The Lord of the Rings: The Fellowship of the Ring
4. Ghost World
5. In the Bedroom
6. Moulin Rouge!
7. The Man Who Wasn't There
8. Shrek
9. Gosford Park (tied for 9th place with The Royal Tenenbaums)
10. The Royal Tenenbaums (tied for 9th place with Gosford Park)

== Winners and nominees ==
=== Best Picture ===
Memento
Mulholland Drive

- Ghost World
- In the Bedroom
- The Lord of the Rings: The Fellowship of the Ring

=== Best Director ===
David Lynch – Mulholland Drive

- Joel Coen – The Man Who Wasn't There
- Todd Field – In the Bedroom
- Peter Jackson – The Lord of the Rings: The Fellowship of the Ring
- Baz Luhrmann – Moulin Rouge!
- Christopher Nolan – Memento

=== Best Actor ===
Billy Bob Thornton – The Man Who Wasn't There

- Russell Crowe – A Beautiful Mind
- Guy Pearce – Memento
- Denzel Washington – Training Day
- Tom Wilkinson – In the Bedroom

=== Best Actress ===
Naomi Watts – Mulholland Drive

- Thora Birch – Ghost World
- Nicole Kidman – The Others
- Sissy Spacek – In the Bedroom
- Tilda Swinton – The Deep End

=== Best Supporting Actor ===
Steve Buscemi – Ghost World

- Ben Kingsley – Sexy Beast
- Jude Law – A.I. Artificial Intelligence
- Ian McKellen – The Lord of the Rings: The Fellowship of the Ring
- Tony Shalhoub – The Man Who Wasn't There

=== Best Supporting Actress ===
Jennifer Connelly – A Beautiful Mind

- Scarlett Johansson – Ghost World
- Helen Mirren – Gosford Park
- Maggie Smith – Gosford Park
- Marisa Tomei – In the Bedroom

=== Best Original Screenplay ===
Mulholland Drive – David Lynch
The Others – Alejandro Amenábar

- Gosford Park – Julian Fellowes
- The Man Who Wasn't There – Joel and Ethan Coen
- The Royal Tenenbaums – Wes Anderson and Owen Wilson

=== Best Adapted Screenplay ===
Memento – Christopher Nolan

- A.I. Artificial Intelligence – Steven Spielberg
- Ghost World – Daniel Clowes and Terry Zwigoff
- In the Bedroom – Todd Field and Rob Festinger
- The Lord of the Rings: The Fellowship of the Ring – Fran Walsh, Philippa Boyens and Peter Jackson

=== Best Foreign Language Film ===
Amélie

- Fat Girl
- In the Mood for Love
- No Man's Land
- With a Friend Like Harry...

=== Best Documentary ===
Startup.com

- Down from the Mountain
- The Endurance
- The Gleaners and I
- Keep the River on Your Right: A Modern Cannibal Tale

=== Best Animated Feature ===
Shrek

- Atlantis: The Lost Empire
- Final Fantasy: The Spirits Within
- Monsters, Inc.
- Waking Life

=== Best Cinematography ===
The Man Who Wasn't There – Roger Deakins

- A.I. Artificial Intelligence – Janusz Kamiński
- The Lord of the Rings: The Fellowship of the Ring – Andrew Lesnie
- Moulin Rouge! – Donald McAlpine
- Mulholland Drive – Peter Deming

=== Best Ensemble ===
Gosford Park

- Ghost World
- The Lord of the Rings: The Fellowship of the Ring
- Ocean's Eleven
- The Royal Tenenbaums

=== Best Original Score ===
Mulholland Drive – Angelo Badalamenti

- A.I. Artificial Intelligence – John Williams
- The Lord of the Rings: The Fellowship of the Ring – Howard Shore
- Moulin Rouge! – Craig Armstrong and Marius de Vries
- Ocean's Eleven – David Holmes

=== Best Overall DVD ===
Moulin Rouge!

- Almost Famous Untitled: The Bootleg Cut
- Citizen Kane
- The Godfather Collection
- Shrek

=== Breakthrough Filmmaker ===
Christopher Nolan – Memento

- Todd Field – In the Bedroom
- Alejandro González Iñárritu – Amores Perros
- Richard Kelly – Donnie Darko
- John Cameron Mitchell – Hedwig and the Angry Inch

=== Breakthrough Performer ===
Naomi Watts – Mulholland Drive

- Hayden Christensen – Life as a House
- John Cameron Mitchell – Hedwig and the Angry Inch
- Audrey Tautou – Amélie
