= The Man Who Wasn't There (2001 film) =

2001 film by Joel and Ethan Coen

- Theatrical release poster
- Directed by: Joel Coen (Note: Although the Coen brothers co-directed this film, Joel received sole credit due to Directors Guild of America regulations)
- Written by: Joel Coen; Ethan Coen
- Produced by: Ethan Coen (Note: Although the Coen brothers both produced this film, Ethan received sole credit due to Directors Guild of America regulations)
- Starring: Billy Bob Thornton; Frances McDormand; Michael Badalucco; Richard Jenkins; Scarlett Johansson; Jon Polito; Tony Shalhoub; James Gandolfini
- Cinematography: Roger Deakins
- Edited by: Roderick Jaynes (Note: Roderick Jaynes is the shared pseudonym used by the Coen brothers for their editing.); Tricia Cooke
- Music by: Carter Burwell
- Production companies: Working Title Films; Mike Zoss Productions
- Distributed by: USA Films (United States); Entertainment Film Distributors (United Kingdom)
- Release dates: May 13, 2001 (Cannes); November 2, 2001 (United States)
- Running time: 116 minutes
- Countries: United Kingdom; United States
- Language: English
- Budget: $20 million
- Box office: $18.9 million

The Man Who Wasn't There is a 2001 neo-noir crime film written, directed, produced and co-edited by Joel and Ethan Coen. It stars Billy Bob Thornton, Frances McDormand, Michael Badalucco, Richard Jenkins, Scarlett Johansson, Jon Polito, Tony Shalhoub, and James Gandolfini. The film is set in 1949 and tells the story of Ed Crane, a withdrawn barber who leads an ordinary life in a small California town with his wife, who he suspects is having an affair with her boss. Crane's situation changes when a stranger comes to the barbershop and offers him the opportunity to join him as a partner in a promising new business, in exchange for an investment of ten thousand dollars. Drawn to the idea, Crane plans to blackmail his wife's lover for the money.

The film is in black-and-white and employs voiceover narration, honoring classic film noir. It differs by including classical music, setting the plot in a small town, and featuring a protagonist from outside the criminal underworld. The Coens began developing the idea from a 1940s haircut poster they saw while filming The Hudsucker Proxy. The plot was influenced by James M. Cain's crime novels, primarily Double Indemnity, The Postman Always Rings Twice, and Mildred Pierce. Aesthetically, The Man Who Wasn't There was inspired by films from the 1940s and 1950s—including Shadow of a Doubt—along with science fiction films and documentaries of the period.

The film premiered and participated in the official selection at the 2001 Cannes Film Festival, where Joel Coen won the award for best director. Its theatrical response was lukewarm, although it was well-received by film critics, who praised Roger Deakins' cinematography and the performances, especially Thornton's. Media critics in The Guardian, the BBC, and The Austin Chronicle referred to it as one of the best films of the year. The National Board of Review included it among its top ten films of the year and awarded Thornton best actor. Deakins received a nomination for the Academy Award for Best Cinematography and the film achieved multiple nominations and awards from other organizations.

== Plot ==
In 1949 Santa Rosa, California, Ed Crane is a quiet barber working in his brother-in-law Frank’s barbershop. His wife Doris, a bookkeeper, struggles with a drinking problem, and their marriage is strained. One day, a customer named Creighton Tolliver tells Ed about an investment opportunity in a new technology called dry cleaning. Tolliver persuades Ed to invest $10,000, but Ed, desperate for money, decides to blackmail Doris's boss, "Big Dave" Brewster, whom he suspects of having an affair with her. Ed anonymously demands money from Brewster, who embezzles funds from his department store to meet the blackmail demands.

However, Brewster soon uncovers the scheme and confronts Ed. After Tolliver implicates Ed in the plan, Brewster beats him to death. In a desperate attempt to protect himself, Ed fatally stabs Brewster with a cigar knife in self-defense. Despite this, the police discover discrepancies in the store’s financial records and arrest Doris, suspecting her of both embezzling the money and murdering Brewster.

Ed hires Freddy Riedenschneider, a Sacramento defense attorney, who arrives in town and immediately starts living lavishly on the defense fund Doris’s family raised by mortgaging the barbershop. On the day of Doris’s trial, she is found dead, having hanged herself in her jail cell. It is later revealed that Doris was pregnant when she died, though she and Ed had not been intimate for years. Ed’s world unravels further as Frank, now deeply in debt and consumed by grief, turns to alcohol.

Amid the chaos, Ed begins spending time with Rachel "Birdy" Abundas, a teenage girl and friend of the family, listening to her play the piano. Ed fantasizes about launching her musical career and becoming her manager, but his dreams are crushed when a music teacher bluntly informs him that Birdy has no talent. On the way home, Birdy makes an overt sexual advance toward Ed, causing him to lose control of his car and crash.

Ed wakes up in the hospital to find himself arrested for murder. Tolliver’s body, beaten and found with Ed’s investment contract, leads the police to believe that Ed coerced Doris into embezzling the money and murdered Tolliver when he discovered the scheme. With no resources left, Ed mortgages his house to hire Riedenschneider for his defense. However, during Riedenschneider’s opening statement, Frank attacks Ed in a fit of rage, and the judge declares a mistrial. With his defense in shambles, Ed throws himself at the mercy of the court, but the judge sentences him to death.

While awaiting execution on death row, Ed writes his life story to sell to a pulp magazine. One night, he sees a UFO outside the prison, which he walks away from. As Ed is led to the electric chair, he reflects on his life and decisions, finding peace with his past. He regrets nothing and holds hope that, in the afterlife, he and Doris will be free from the imperfections of the mortal world.

== Cast ==
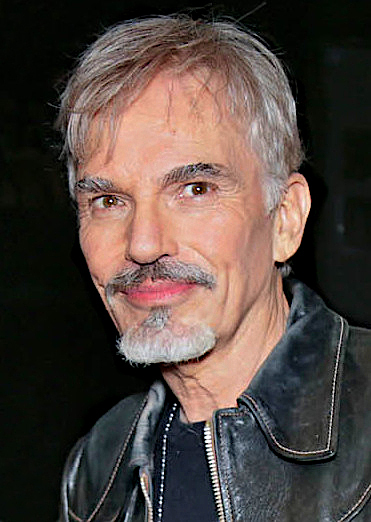
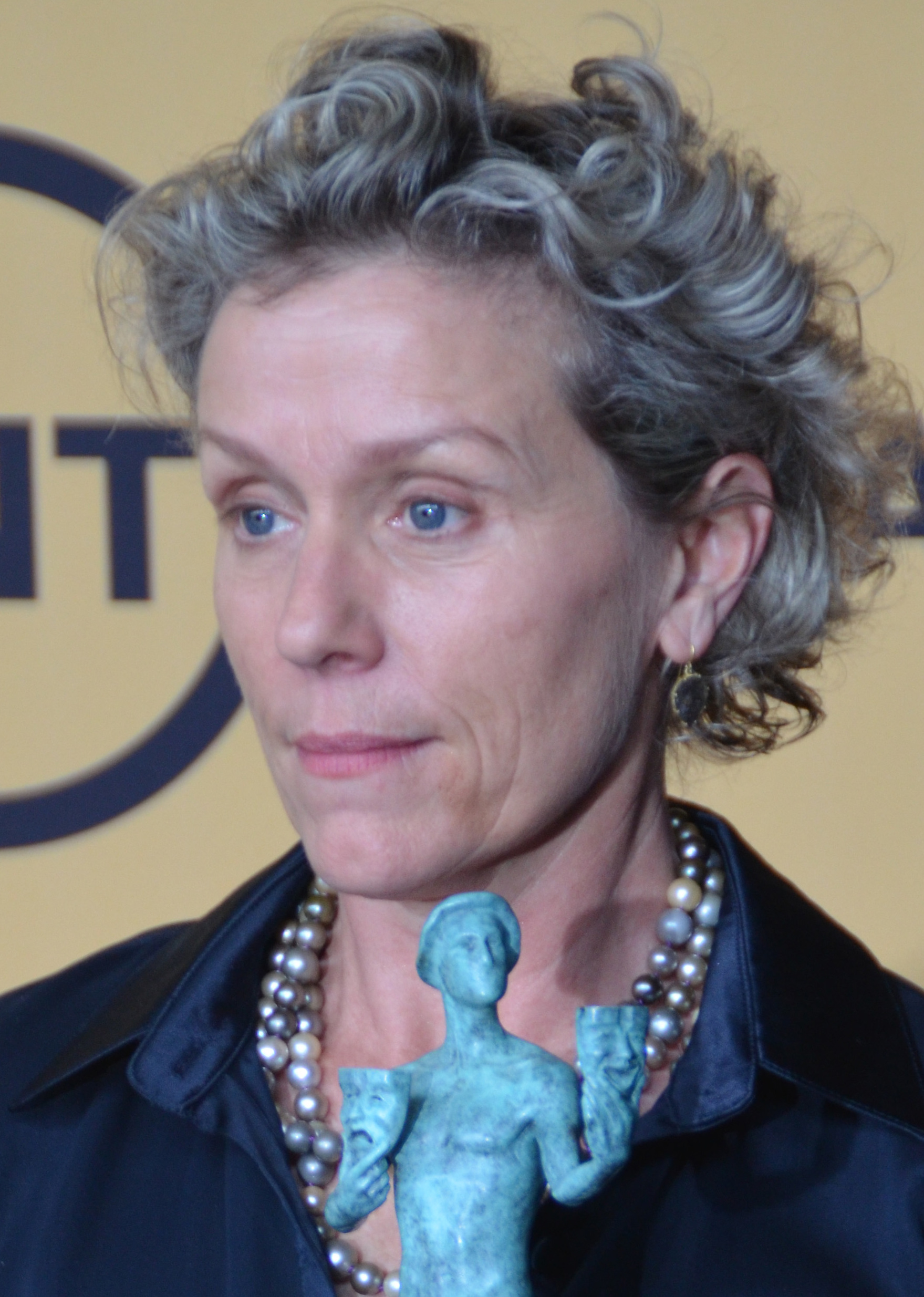
Billy Bob Thornton and Frances McDormand star as married couple Ed and Doris Crane.
- Billy Bob Thornton as Ed Crane
- Frances McDormand as Doris Crane
- Michael Badalucco as Frank Raffo
- Richard Jenkins as Walter Abundas
- Scarlett Johansson as Rachel "Birdy" Abundas
- Jon Polito as Creighton Tolliver
- Tony Shalhoub as Freddy Riedenschneider
- James Gandolfini as Dave "Big Dave" Brewster
- Katherine Borowitz as Ann Nirdlinger Brewster
- Christopher Kriesa as Officer Persky
- Brian Haley as Officer Krebs
- Jack McGee as P.I. Burns

== Background ==
The idea of writing a film starring a barber was inspired by a poster that the Coen brothers saw while filming The Hudsucker Proxy (1994). "We filmed a scene in a barbershop, and there was a poster on the wall showing all the different 1940s-style haircuts," recalled Joel Coen. "It was a fixture on the set, and we were always looking at it. So we started thinking about the guy who actually did the haircuts, and the story began to take shape. It really evolved from that haircut poster." The directors took the title of the film from the 1899 poem written by William Hughes Mearns entitled "Antigonish" and they chose it in reference to the character of the barber, to reflect his emotional emptiness.

Yesterday, upon the stair,
I met a man who wasn't there!
He wasn't there again today,
I wish, I wish he'd go away!

— First lines of the poem "Antigonish" (1899) by William Hughes Mearns

Set in 1949, the plot—according to Joel Coen—"is heavily influenced" by the work of writer James M. Cain, in particular, the novels Double Indemnity, The Postman Always Rings Twice, and Mildred Pierce. Despite being a neo-noir story, The Coens replaced the underworld setting with a typical American town with ordinary people. "The criminal element here is sort of inadvertent. The hero sort of stumbles into it," Ethan Coen explained. This storytelling device was an homage to Cain, whose stories usually featured characters with conventional jobs who, motivated by need or greed, ended up involved in a crime. Other conventions were present in The Man Who Wasn't There, such as the plan to get money quickly, sexual misadventures, and coincidences of fate. The failure of a "perfect plan" to raise money appears in Double Indemnity and The Postman Always Rings Twice, both novels narrated by down-and-out working-class men during the Great Depression.

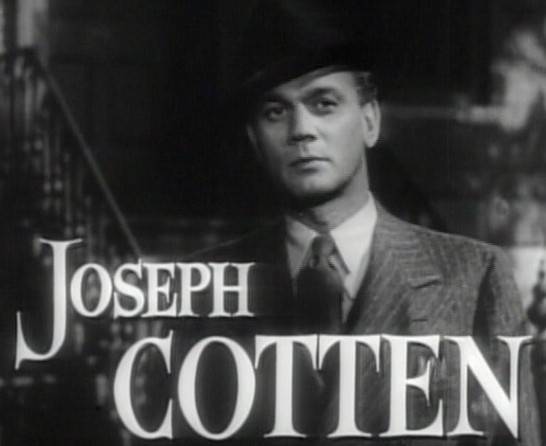
One of the film's influences was Shadow of a Doubt (1943), also set in Santa Rosa, California.

The Coens named Shadow of a Doubt as a reference to the film and had in mind the science fiction genre of the 1950s. The film's aesthetics were influenced by science fiction cinema and "cheap documentaries of the '50s". Cinematographer Roger Deakins drew inspiration for his work from the 1940s and 1950s films such as This Gun for Hire, The Blue Dahlia, Kiss Me Deadly, and Touch of Evil. Likewise, The Atlantic's Christopher Orr compared the voiceover and Crane's reserved character with the character of Robert Mitchum in the film Out of the Past (1947). The Coens referred to other works through character names, as in the department store Nirdlinger or Dietrichson —surnames used in Double Indemnity—Riedenschneider —the surname of a character from The Asphalt Jungle — or the name of Tolliver's hotel, "The Hobart Arms", an homage to the novel The Big Sleep by Raymond Chandler.

In addition to Cain's novels and film noir, the story borrowed ideas from existentialist literature, such as Albert Camus's The Stranger. In addition to noting the similarities in both works, authors and critics compared the disconnection with reality and Ed's attitude with that of the protagonist of Camus's novel. Through his main character, The Man Who Wasn't There explores the existentialist view of despair, a theme reminiscent of philosopher Søren Kierkegaard. Authors Jean-Pierre Boulé and Enda McCaffrey compared Crane's attempt to escape from his routine life with Jean-Paul Sartre's idea of a "search for transcendence", with dry cleaning, the character of Birdy, and UFOs being gestures toward this search. Although The Man Who Wasn't There, cataloged as postmodern, inherited film noir thematic and narrative elements, at the same time it explored concepts of the post World War II period, portraying America's early postwar years. The story was contextualized by events such as UFOs, references to the bombings of Hiroshima and Nagasaki, Werner Heisenberg's reflections on humanity, and the idea of succeeding in an age of opportunity. The plot alludes to Heisenberg's uncertainty principle through the character of defense attorney Riedenschneider, who refers to that principle more than once.

== Production ==
=== Development ===
The Coen brothers began writing the script in the mid-1990s, after filming The Big Lebowski. The brothers moved to Ireland — where Frances McDormand was working — to continue writing. The Coens sent the script to producers Eric Fellner and Tim Bevan of Working Title; they intended to start production in 1999, but taking advantage of George Clooney's availability, they dedicated themselves to O Brother, Where Art Thou?. Following completion of O Brother, The Man Who Wasn't There was financed independently by Working Title, Gramercy Pictures, and Good Machine, raising an approximate budget of $20 million.

The Coens wrote the characters of Doris and Frank for McDormand and Michael Badalucco, respectively, and cast Billy Bob Thornton, an actor with whom they had not worked before, for the title role. Thornton accepted the role before reading the script: "I knew that it would be good. There are certain people you know you can't go wrong with." The Coens had to convince James Gandolfini, who had just finished filming The Mexican and was about to return to The Sopranos, to join the cast as Big Dave Brewster; he finally agreed after reading the script and finding Big Dave "different from anything else I've ever done. He's kind of a big lug, a bit of a loudmouth, and clotheshorse kind of guy." Coens regulars Jon Polito and Tony Shalhoub soon joined the cast, followed by Adam Alexi-Malle, Katherine Borowitz, Richard Jenkins, and Scarlett Johansson. Jenkins initially declined the casting call because he had been rejected from three previous Coen productions.

=== Filming ===
Filming began on June 26, 2000, in California and ended on September 1, after ten weeks. Deakins' cinematography was simple and traditional. Most of the shots were taken with the camera at eye level, with normal lenses and a long depth of field. Compared to older American film noir, Deakins used a wide range of grays and attempted to create low contrast without many strong shadows, using fewer and larger lights. He used contemporary technologies and wanted the film to reflect the era in which it was made, noting that "we're not trying to make an old movie." It was filmed with color 35mm film and converted to black and white during post-production. This procedure was due, in part, to technical reasons since in recent decades the availability of black and white film rolls had become scarce. However, due to contractual and marketing requirements, it was released in color in some countries. Joel Coen noted that "the film wasn't made to be seen in color" and that in color it would look "horribly out of place" due to grayscale neutralizing colors outside the time frame of the plot.

For a lot of intangible reasons that are not easy to explain, black and white seemed to be appropriate for the plot. It's a movie from a historical period and the black and white helps the feel of that time. It's evocative for a story like this in ways color photography isn't.

— Joel Coen

The set and costume design by Dennis Gassner and Mary Zophres, respectively, had to adapt to the absence of color, avoiding distracting high contrasts. Black and white also affected the actors, intensifying some elements: "Just a close-up is very striking because of the shadows and the sense of depth," said McDormand. However, the team did not lose sight of the color version and designed the locations avoiding bright colors and preferring browns and grays. Ed Crane's clothing consisted of sports jackets, gabardine and rayon shirts. Typical of those years, McDormand's stockings had no elastic at the top, and — like the extras — she used garters to hold them up. Women's clothing included seamed stockings, girdles, and pointy bras. Defense attorney Freddy Riedenschneider's unusual for the time peaked lapel double-breasted suit was inspired by Salvador Dalí, according to costume designer Mary Zophres, to suggest opulence.

To compose his character's look, Thornton looked at images of figures from that decade and borrowed some elements from Raymond Burr and Frank Sinatra. The actor commented, "Once you get the right look, everything in your attitude changes." When Ed appears on screen, he is almost always seen smoking a Chesterfield. Professional barbers trained Thornton and Badalucco.

==== Locations ====
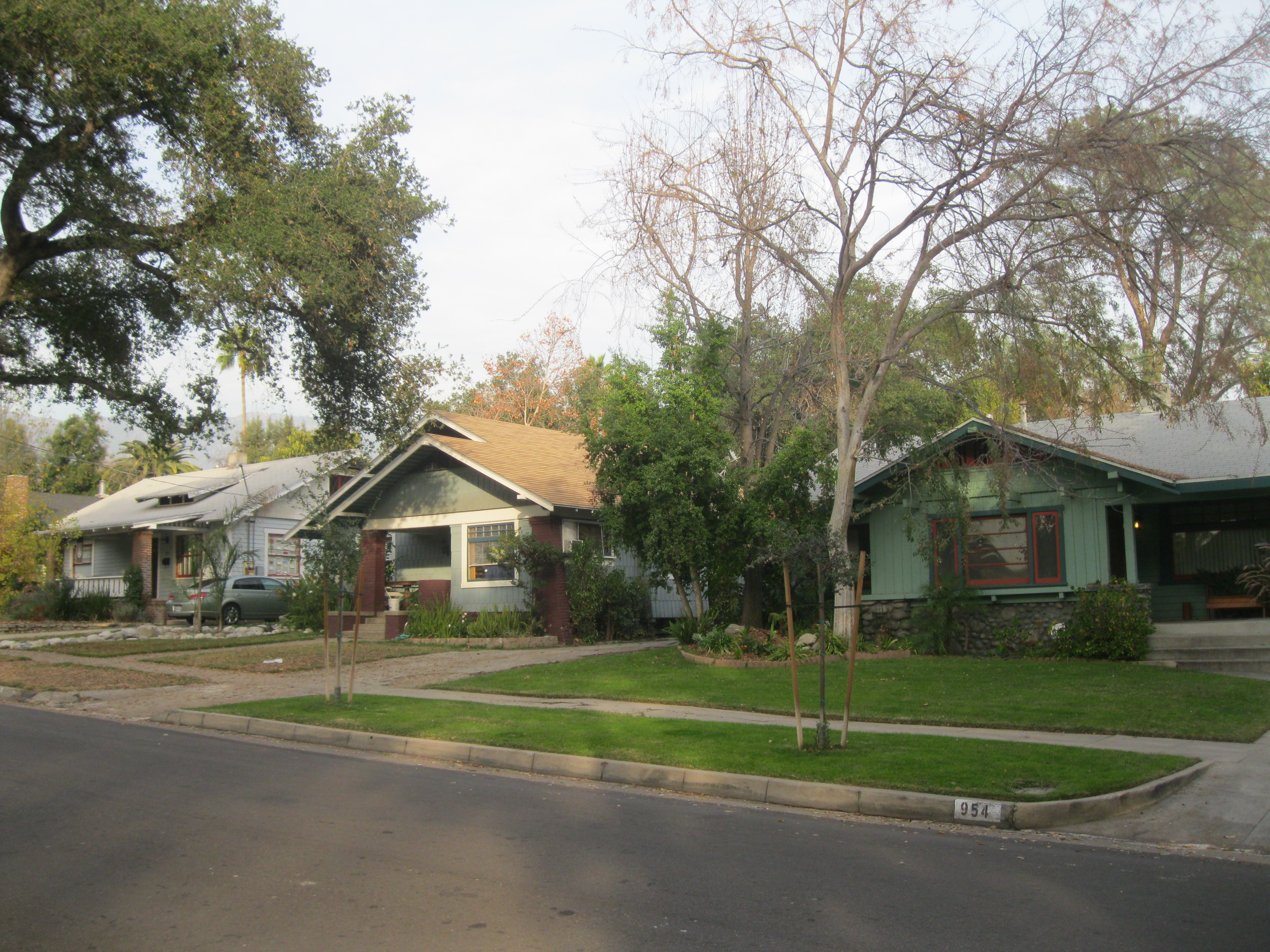
The Bungalow Heaven neighborhood located in the city of Pasadena (California) was used to shoot exterior scenes of Ed Crane's house.

Filming began in the abandoned Lincoln Heights Jail in Los Angeles to set up a Santa Rosa city jail cell. It continued in East Los Angeles and the Musso & Frank Grill restaurant on Hollywood Boulevard, where Ed Crane meets his attorney for the first time. Production moved to Thousand Oaks for two days to shoot the country wedding scenes; Michael Badalucco had to practice extensively for the scene where he rides a pig. The production then returned to Los Angeles to film in a Presbyterian church on Wilshire Boulevard and to Downtown Los Angeles, including an apartment complex that was used to make the hotel lobby scenes and an abandoned Bank of America used for the scenes where Ed goes to the bank. The Nirdlingers building, where Doris works as an accountant, was created in an abandoned furniture store located in Glendale, as production designer Dennis Gassner recalled:

We had to modernize it in a certain way, keeping what was already in the architecture and making it work for the modern style of 1949. That space was like a quarry where I could extract what I needed. In fact, I used some chrome art deco bulwark designs that had been kept on the walls and various wall moldings.

A day of filming took place in the city of Orange, which was used to represent the exteriors of the town of Santa Rosa, where the majority of the film is set. Although only in Orange for one day, the team worked for more than two weeks dressing the streets for the film's 1949 setting: traffic signs were replaced, facades were modified, and minor street repairs were made. The exterior scenes of Ed Crane's house were filmed in the Pasadena neighborhood of Bungalow Heaven, a popular and affordable location in the mid-twentieth century. The Coens chose a house with a lower ceiling to achieve the impression of a smaller space and represent the economic situation typical of a barber. The scenes in the piano teacher's room were also shot in Pasadena, in the Green Hotel building complex. The film was mostly filmed on location, but a few scenes, such as those at the barbershop, were shot at the end of principal photography on a set built by Gassner at Paramount Studios.

=== Music ===
The film's soundtrack consists of classical music, primarily piano sonatas by Ludwig van Beethoven, interspersed with seven new compositions by Carter Burwell, in his ninth collaboration with the Coens. In addition to Beethoven, the soundtrack included a Mozart composition, "Sull'aria ... che soave zeffiretto;" the atypical inclusion of classical music distinguishes the film from others in the noir genre. Music editor Todd Kasow was tasked with selecting suitable sonatas for the soundtrack while Burwell began work on a "pianocentric" composition. Some of the compositions feature "cyclical" structures that symbolize the situation the protagonist finds himself in and his difficulty in freeing himself from it, but at the same time, the Coens felt it was essential to the character that the music suggests "a vague longing." Journalist Dan Goldwasser described Burwell's work as "dark and solemn" and wrote that the main composition, "The Trial of Ed Crane", has "a kind of romanticism with just a hint of hope".

The Decca Records label released the soundtrack album on October 30, 2001.

No.	Title	Music	Length
1.	"Birdy's "Pathétique"" (Piano Sonata No. 8 In C Minor, Op. 13)	Jonathan Feldman	1:17
2.	"Che soave zeffiretto" (Wolfgang Amadeus Mozart)	Edith Mathis, Gundula Janowitz and the Deutsche Opera Berlin	3:33
3.	"Bringing Doris Home" (Piano Sonata No. 25 In G Major, Op. 79)	Jonathan Feldman	1:18
4.	"I Met Doris Blind"	Carter Burwell	1:15
5.	"Ed Visits Dave"	Carter Burwell	1:03
6.	"Ed Returns Home" (Piano Sonata No. 23 In F Minor, Op. 57 "Appassionata" (Beethoven))	Jonathan Feldman	1:57
7.	"I Love You Birdy Abundas!"	Carter Burwell	0:42
8.	"Nirdlinger's Swing"	Carter Burwell	5:12
9.	"Moonlight Sonata" (Piano Sonata No. 14 In C Sharp Minor, Op. 27 "Moonlight")	Jonathan Feldman	2:29
10.	"The Fight"	Carter Burwell	3:01
11.	"The Bank"	Carter Burwell	1:03
12.	"Adagio Cantabile" (Adagio Cantabile From Piano Sonata No. 8 In C Minor, Op. 13 "Pathétique")	Jonathan Feldman	5:33
13.	"The Trial of Ed Crane"	Carter Burwell	3:52
14.	"Andante Cantabile" (Piano Trio No. 7 In B Flat, Op. 97 "Archduke")	Beaux Arts Trio	13:28
Total length:			45:43

== Release ==
=== Premiere ===
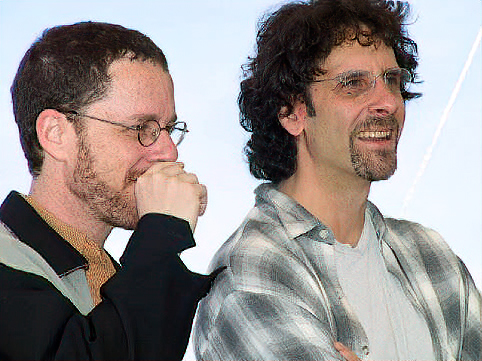
The Coen Brothers at the film's premiere at the 2001 Cannes Film Festival. Joel Coen shared the festival award for best director with David Lynch. (Note: The Coen brothers directed the film together, but Directors Guild of America rules only allowed for Joel to be credited)

The film premiered at the Cannes Film Festival on May 13, 2001, followed by other European film festivals that year, such as Edinburgh, Flanders, Warsaw, and Vienna. On October 31, 2001, it premiered in Los Angeles and New York, followed by a limited release in American cinemas by USA Films. It was the first Coen film to be released in black and white, something the directors had tried unsuccessfully with Blood Simple (1984) and The Hudsucker Proxy (1994) in the face of the advantages of color distribution.

=== Home media ===
The first home edition was available on DVD released by USA Home Entertainment in 2002. DVD extras included commentary by the Coen brothers and Thornton recorded on January 8, 2002, a sixteen-minute making-of, an interview with Deakins, five deleted scenes, a photo gallery, and promotional videos.

In September 2002, a three-disc DVD edition was released in France, with the original, black and white version on the first disc, the color version on the second disc, and a third disc of extras, which included a fifty minute documentary entitled The Film Noir Universe.

In September 2015, Universal Pictures Home Entertainment released a Blu-ray edition of the film.

The Criterion Collection released a 4K Blu-ray edition on February 24, 2026. It reproduces most of the special features of the 2002 USA Home Entertainment release plus a newly-recorded 40 minute interview between crime novelist Megan Abbott and the Coen brothers about the film and its influences.

== Reception ==
=== Box office ===
The Man Who Wasn't There grossed $7.5 million in the United States and Canada, and $11.4 million in other territories, for a worldwide total of $18.9 million against its $20 million budget. The film was the Coen Brothers' worst-performing film at the box office since The Hudsucker Proxy (1994). Some speculated that the poor returns were because the film is in black and white. In its opening weekend in the United States, it grossed $664,404 from thirty-nine theaters.

=== Critical response ===
On the review aggregator website Rotten Tomatoes, 81% of 159 critics' reviews are positive, with an average rating of 7.1/10. The website's consensus reads: "Stylish but emotionally distant, The Man Who Wasn't There is a clever tribute to the film noir genre." Metacritic, which uses a weighted average, assigned the film a score of 73 out of 100, based on 33 critics, indicating "generally favorable" reviews.

Many critics praised the film for its technique and performances. Richard Schickel of Time wrote "affectlessness is not a quality much prized in movie protagonists, but Billy Bob Thornton, that splendid actor, does it perfectly as Ed Crane, a taciturn small-town barber, circa 1949." Emanuel Levy, of Screen Daily wrote that Thornton "acquits himself marvellously in a demanding role that mostly calls for reaction rather than action", adding that he comes across as "a tormented and soulful Montgomery Clift." Todd McCarthy of Variety wrote that Thornton's Ed Crane "sets new standards for opaqueness and passivity."

Jonathan Rosenbaum of the Chicago Reader wrote that "Joel and Ethan Coen stay true to their bent for dense heroes and neonoir, and to their unshakable conviction that life usually turns out to be splendidly horrific." Roger Ebert of the Chicago Sun-Times commented that the film "is so assured and perceptive in its style, so loving, so intensely right, that if you can receive on that frequency, [it] is like a voluptuous feast." Similarly, Peter Travers of Rolling Stone named it one of the best films of the year and expressed that it is "devilishly funny" and highlighted the photography and performances. Travers included The Man Who Wasn't There at number eight on his list of the ten best indie films of 2001. Peter Bradshaw of The Guardian described it as "the best American film of the year" and Philip French, in another review for The Guardian, also wrote that it was the best film of the year up to that point. Likewise, Marc Savlov of the Austin Chronicle called it "the best-looking film of the year" and added that Thornton's performance "is dazzling, a dull diamond in the gutter rough." The BBC critic Nev Pierce also described it as "one of the best films of the year" and added about its viewing that it was "a unique, peculiar, riveting experience."

Deakins's black-and-white photography was singled out by several critics. The Chicago Reader compared the photography to Federico Fellini's 8½ and, despite writing a lukewarm review, McCarthy's Variety review praised Deakins' work, Dennis Gassner's sets, and Mary Zophres' costumes that create a "a superior post-war, small-town period feel."

McCarthy concluded that "the film holds the interest, to be sure, but more due to the sure sense of craft and precise effect that one expects from the Coens than from genuine involvement in the story." Similarly, David Denby of The New Yorker called it a “dud academic exercise”. Michael Sragow of The Baltimore Sun was also critical, writing that the film "is an intellectualized, aestheticized, altogether hollow period piece. Despite its superb, claustrophobically controlled black-and-white look, it has all the impact of a cap pistol."

=== Awards and nominations ===
Award	Date of the ceremony	Category	Recipients	Result	Ref.
Cannes Film Festival	9–20 May 2001	Palme d'Or	The Man Who Wasn't There	Nominated	
Cannes Film Festival	9–20 May 2001	Best Director (tied with David Lynch for Mulholland Drive)	Joel Coen and Ethan Coen	Won	
British Society of Cinematographers	7 December 2001	Best Cinematography in a Theatrical Feature Film	Roger Deakins	Won	
Los Angeles Film Critics Association	15 December 2001	Best Cinematography	Roger Deakins	Won	
Boston Society of Film Critics	16 December 2001	Best Cinematography	Roger Deakins	Won	
New York Film Critics Online	17 December 2001	Best Cinematography	Roger Deakins	Won	
Online Film Critics Society	2 January 2002	Top 10 Films	The Man Who Wasn't There	7th place	
Online Film Critics Society	2 January 2002	Best Director	Joel Coen and Ethan Coen	Nominated	
Online Film Critics Society	2 January 2002	Best Actor	Billy Bob Thornton	Won	
Online Film Critics Society	2 January 2002	Best Supporting Actor	Tony Shalhoub	Nominated	
Online Film Critics Society	2 January 2002	Best Original Screenplay	Joel Coen and Ethan Coen	Nominated	
Online Film Critics Society	2 January 2002	Best Cinematography	Roger Deakins	Won	
Dallas–Fort Worth Film Critics Association	3 January 2002	Top 10 Films	The Man Who Wasn't There	7th place	
Dallas–Fort Worth Film Critics Association	3 January 2002	Best Actor	Billy Bob Thornton	Nominated	
Florida Film Critics Circle	3 January 2002	Best Actor	Billy Bob Thornton (also for Bandits and Monster's Ball)	Won	
Florida Film Critics Circle	3 January 2002	Best Cinematography	Roger Deakins	Nominated	
National Society of Film Critics	4 January 2002	Best Cinematography	Roger Deakins	Nominated	
American Film Institute Awards	5 January 2002	Movie of the Year	The Man Who Wasn't There	Nominated	
American Film Institute Awards	5 January 2002	Actor of the Year – Male – Movies	Billy Bob Thornton	Nominated	
American Film Institute Awards	5 January 2002	Featured Actor of the Year – Male – Movies	Tony Shalhoub	Nominated	
American Film Institute Awards	5 January 2002	Cinematographer of the Year	Roger Deakins	Won	
New York Film Critics	6 January 2002	Best Cinematographer	Roger Deakins	Nominated	
National Board of Review	7 January 2002	Top Ten Films	The Man Who Wasn't There	7th place	
National Board of Review	7 January 2002	Best Actor	Billy Bob Thornton (also for Bandits and Monster's Ball)	Won	
Las Vegas Film Critics Society	8 January 2002	Best Actor	Billy Bob Thornton	Nominated	
Las Vegas Film Critics Society	8 January 2002	Best Cinematography	Roger Deakins	Nominated	
Critics' Choice Movie Awards	11 January 2002	Top 10 Films	The Man Who Wasn't There	Won	
Critics' Choice Movie Awards	11 January 2002	Best Picture	The Man Who Wasn't There	Nominated	
Critics' Choice Movie Awards	11 January 2002	Best Original Screenplay	The Man Who Wasn't There	Nominated	
Art Directors Guild	16 January 2002	Excellence in Production Design for a Period or Fantasy Film	Dennis Gassner, Chris Gorak, and Lance Hammer	Nominated	
Satellite Awards	19 January 2002	Best Cinematography	Roger Deakins	Won	
Golden Globe Awards	20 January 2002	Best Motion Picture – Drama	The Man Who Wasn't There	Nominated	
Golden Globe Awards	20 January 2002	Best Actor in a Motion Picture – Drama	Billy Bob Thornton	Nominated	
Golden Globe Awards	20 January 2002	Best Screenplay	Joel Coen and Ethan Coen	Nominated	
Empire Awards	5 February 2002	Best Actor	Billy Bob Thornton	Won	
London Film Critics' Circle	13 February 2002	Actor of the Year	Billy Bob Thornton	Won	
London Film Critics' Circle	13 February 2002	Screenwriter of the Year	Roger Deakins	Won	
American Society of Cinematographers	17 February 2002	Outstanding Achievement in Cinematography in Theatrical Release	Roger Deakins	Won	
British Academy Film Awards	24 February 2002	Best Cinematography	Roger Deakins	Won	
Chicago Film Critics Association	25 February 2002	Best Supporting Actor	Tony Shalhoub	Nominated	
Chicago Film Critics Association	25 February 2002	Best Cinematography	Roger Deakins	Nominated	
César Awards	2 March 2002	Best Foreign Film	The Man Who Wasn't There	Nominated	
Writers Guild of America Awards	2 March 2002	Best Original Screenplay	Joel Coen and Ethan Coen	Nominated	
Academy Awards	24 March 2002	Best Cinematography	Roger Deakins	Nominated	
David di Donatello	10 April 2002	Best International Film	The Man Who Wasn't There	Won	
Saturn Awards	10 June 2002	Best Action or Adventure Film	The Man Who Wasn't There	Nominated	
Saturn Awards	10 June 2002	Best Actor	Billy Bob Thornton	Nominated	
Saturn Awards	10 June 2002	Best Supporting Actress	Frances McDormand	Nominated	

== Bibliography ==
- Allen, William Rodney (2006). The Coen Brothers: Interviews. Mississippi: University Press of Mississippi. ISBN 978-1578068890.
- Bergan, Ronald (2016). The Coen Brothers, Second Edition. New York: Skyhorse Publishing, Inc. ISBN 978-1628725667.
- Nathan, Ian (2012). Masters of Cinema: Ethan and Joel Coen. London: Phaidon Press. ISBN 978-2866429034.
- Robson, Eddie (2007). Coen Brothers - Virgin Film. New York: Random House. ISBN 978-0753547700.
