= Florida Film Critics Circle Awards 2001 =

Annual US film awards ceremony

6th FFCC Awards

January 2, 2002

Best Film:
Amélie

The 6th Florida Film Critics Circle Awards were announced on 3 January 2002.

== Winners ==
- Best Actor:
  - Billy Bob Thornton - Bandits, The Man Who Wasn't There and Monster's Ball
- Best Actress:
  - Sissy Spacek - In the Bedroom
- Best Animated Film:
  - Shrek
- Best Cast:
  - Gosford Park
- Best Cinematography:
  - The Man Who Wasn't There - Roger Deakins
- Best Director:
  - Peter Jackson - The Lord of the Rings: The Fellowship of the Ring
- Best Documentary Film:
  - startup.com
- Best Film:
  - Amélie (Le fabuleux destin d'Amélie Poulain)
- Best Foreign Language Film:
  - Amélie (Le fabuleux destin d'Amélie Poulain) • France/Germany
- Best Newcomer:
  - John Cameron Mitchell - Hedwig and the Angry Inch
- Best Screenplay:
  - Memento - Christopher Nolan
- Best Song:
  - Stephen Trask - Hedwig and the Angry Inch
- Best Supporting Actor:
  - Ben Kingsley - Sexy Beast
- Best Supporting Actress:
  - Cate Blanchett - Bandits, The Lord of the Rings: The Fellowship of the Ring, The Man Who Cried and The Shipping News
