= Killings (short story) =

- Short story by Andre Dubus
- Country: United States
- Language: English
- Genre: short story

Publication
- Published in: Finding a Girl in America In the Bedroom
- Publisher: Vintage Contemporaries
- Publication date: 1979 & 2002

"Killings" is a short story written by Andre Dubus in 1979. It entails how a man seeks revenge after the murder of his son. In 2001, the story was adapted into the feature-length film In the Bedroom, directed by Todd Field and starring Sissy Spacek, Tom Wilkinson, and Marisa Tomei. The film was nominated for five Academy Awards – Best Picture, Best Actor (Wilkinson), Best Actress (Spacek), Supporting Actress (Tomei), and Best Adapted Screenplay (Robert Festinger & Field). After the film's release the story was republished in a collection called In the Bedroom, for which Field wrote the preface.

The work deals with the emotional struggle that the main character, Matt Fowler, encounters as he is forced to confront the killer of his son.
