= Dallas–Fort Worth Film Critics Association Award for Best Actress =

Annual US film award

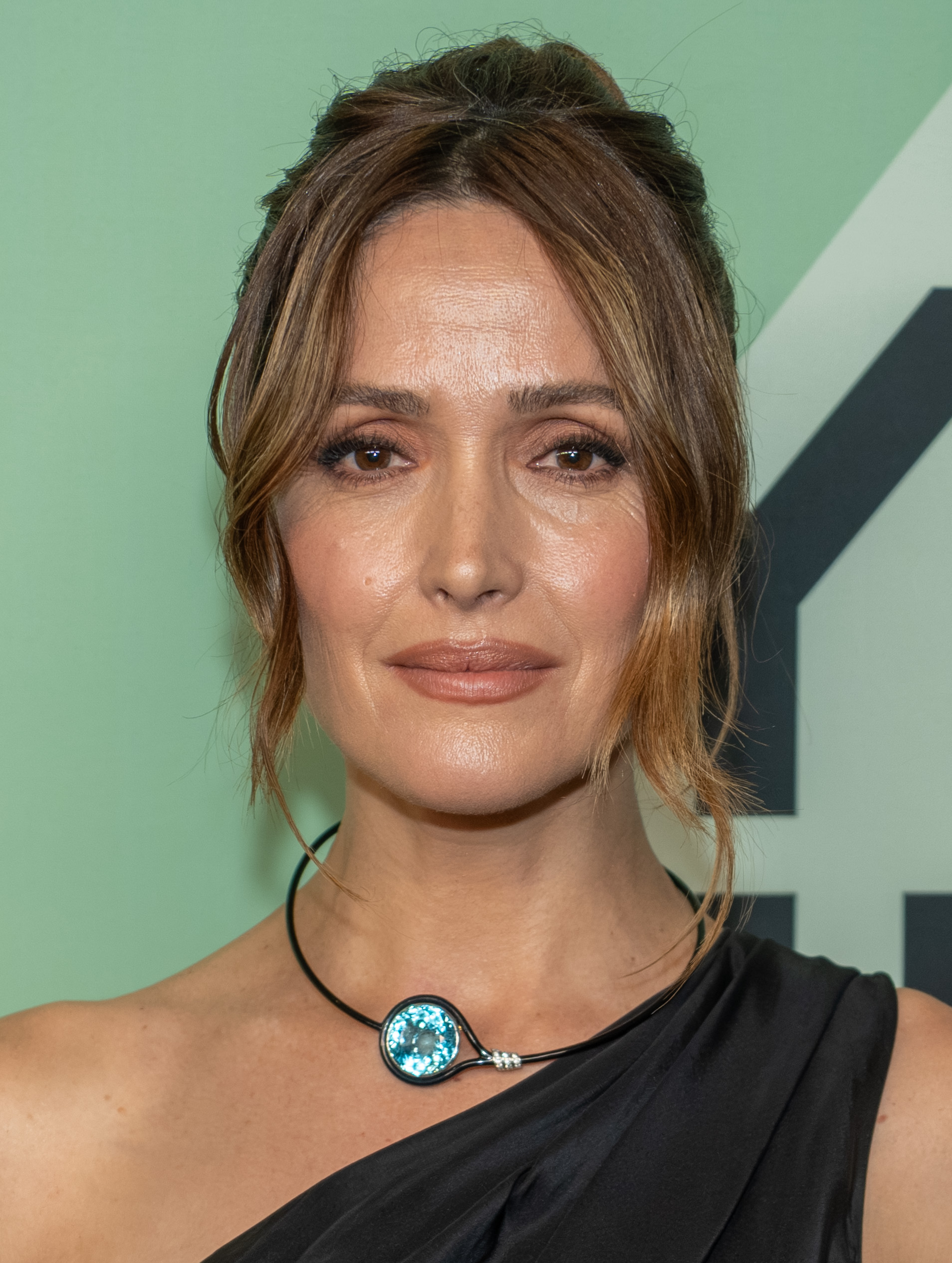
- The 2025 recipient: Rose Byrne
- Awarded for: Best Performance by an Actress in a Leading Role
- Country: United States
- Presented by: Dallas–Fort Worth Film Critics Association
- First award: Kathy Bates; Misery (1990)
- Currently held by: Rose Byrne; If I Had Legs I'd Kick You (2025)
- Website: dfwcritics.com

The Dallas–Fort Worth Film Critics Association Award for Best Actress is an award presented by the Dallas–Fort Worth Film Critics Association. It is given in honor of an actress who has delivered an outstanding performance in a leading role.

== Winners and nominees ==
- † = Winner of the Academy Award for Best Actress

=== 1990s ===
Year	Winner	Film	Role
1990	Kathy Bates †	Misery	Annie Wilkes
1991	Jodie Foster †	The Silence of the Lambs	Clarice Starling
1992	Emma Thompson	Howards End	Margaret Schlegel
1993	Holly Hunter †	The Piano	Ada McGrath
1994	Linda Fiorentino	The Last Seduction	Bridget Gregory
1994	Jodie Foster	Nell	Nell Kellty
1995	Elisabeth Shue	Leaving Las Vegas	Sera
1996	Frances McDormand †	Fargo	Marge Gunderson
1997	Helena Bonham Carter	The Wings of the Dove	Kate Croy
1998	Cate Blanchett	Elizabeth	Elizabeth I of England
1999	Hilary Swank †	Boys Don't Cry	Brandon Teena / Teena Renae Brandon

=== 2000s ===
Year	Winner and nominees	Film	Role
2000	Laura Linney	You Can Count on Me	Samantha "Sammy" Prescott
2000	Joan Allen	The Contender	Senator Laine Billings Hanson
2000	Ellen Burstyn	Requiem for a Dream	Sara Goldfarb
2000	Julia Roberts †	Erin Brockovich	Erin Brockovich
2000	Renée Zellweger	Nurse Betty	Betty Sizemore
2001	Sissy Spacek	In the Bedroom	Ruth Fowler
2001	Halle Berry †	Monster's Ball	Leticia Musgrove
2001	Nicole Kidman	Moulin Rouge!	Satine
2001	Tilda Swinton	The Deep End	Margaret Hall
2001	Renée Zellweger	Bridget Jones's Diary	Bridget Jones
2002	Julianne Moore	Far from Heaven	Cathleen "Cathy" Whitaker
2002	Salma Hayek	Frida	Frida Kahlo
2002	Isabelle Huppert	The Piano Teacher	Erika Kohut
2002	Nicole Kidman †	The Hours	Virginia Woolf
2002	Renée Zellweger	Chicago	Roxie Hart
2003	Charlize Theron †	Monster	Aileen Wuornos
2003	Scarlett Johansson	Lost in Translation	Charlotte
2003	Diane Keaton	Something's Gotta Give	Erica Barry
2003	Nicole Kidman	Cold Mountain	Ada Monroe
2003	Naomi Watts	21 Grams	Cristina Peck
2004	Hilary Swank †	Million Dollar Baby	Margaret "Maggie" Fitzgerald
2004	Annette Bening	Being Julia	Julia Lambert
2004	Catalina Sandino Moreno	Maria Full of Grace	María Álvarez
2004	Imelda Staunton	Vera Drake	Vera Drake
2004	Kate Winslet	Eternal Sunshine of the Spotless Mind	Clementine Kruczynski
2005	Felicity Huffman	Transamerica	Sabrina "Bree" Osbourne
2005	Joan Allen	The Upside of Anger	Terry Wolfmayer
2005	Keira Knightley	Pride & Prejudice	Elizabeth "Lizzie" Bennet
2005	Charlize Theron	North Country	Josie Aimes
2005	Reese Witherspoon †	Walk the Line	June Carter Cash
2006	Helen Mirren †	The Queen	Queen Elizabeth II
2006	Penélope Cruz	Volver	Raimunda
2006	Judi Dench	Notes on a Scandal	Barbara Covett
2006	Maggie Gyllenhaal	Sherrybaby	Sherry Swanson
2006	Meryl Streep	The Devil Wears Prada	Miranda Priestly
2006	Kate Winslet	Little Children	Sarah Pierce
2007	Julie Christie	Away from Her	Fiona Anderson
2007	Marion Cotillard †	La Vie en Rose (La Môme)	Édith Piaf
2007	Angelina Jolie	A Mighty Heart	Mariane Pearl
2007	Laura Linney	The Savages	Wendy Savage
2007	Elliot Page	Juno	Juno MacGuff
2008	Anne Hathaway	Rachel Getting Married	Kym Buchman
2008	Sally Hawkins	Happy-Go-Lucky	Pauline "Poppy" Cross
2008	Meryl Streep	Doubt	Sister Aloysius Beauvier
2008	Kristin Scott Thomas	I've Loved You So Long	Juliette Fontaine
2008	Kate Winslet	Revolutionary Road	April Wheeler
2009	Carey Mulligan	An Education	Jenny Miller
2009	Emily Blunt	The Young Victoria	Queen Victoria
2009	Sandra Bullock †	The Blind Side	Leigh Anne Tuohy
2009	Gabourey Sidibe	Precious	Claireece "Precious" Jones
2009	Meryl Streep	Julie & Julia	Julia Child

=== 2010s ===
Year	Winner and nominees	Film	Role
2010	Natalie Portman †	Black Swan	Nina Sayers
2010	Annette Bening	The Kids Are All Right	Dr. Nicole "Nic" Allgood
2010	Nicole Kidman	Rabbit Hole	Becca Corbett
2010	Jennifer Lawrence	Winter's Bone	Ree Dolly
2010	Michelle Williams	Blue Valentine	Cindy Heller
2011	Michelle Williams	My Week with Marilyn	Marilyn Monroe
2011	Kirsten Dunst	Melancholia	Justine
2011	Meryl Streep †	The Iron Lady	Margaret Thatcher
2011	Tilda Swinton	We Need to Talk About Kevin	Eva Khatchadourian
2011	Charlize Theron	Young Adult	Mavis Gary
2012	Jessica Chastain	Zero Dark Thirty	Maya Harris
2012	Jennifer Lawrence †	Silver Linings Playbook	Tiffany Maxwell
2012	Helen Mirren	Hitchcock	Alma Reville
2012	Emmanuelle Riva	Amour	Anne Laurent
2012	Naomi Watts	The Impossible	Maria Bennett
2012	Quvenzhané Wallis	Beasts of the Southern Wild	Hushpuppy
2013	Cate Blanchett †	Blue Jasmine	Jeanette "Jasmine" Francis
2013	Sandra Bullock	Gravity	Dr. Ryan Stone
2013	Judi Dench	Philomena	Philomena Lee
2013	Meryl Streep	August: Osage County	Violet Weston
2013	Emma Thompson	Saving Mr. Banks	P. L. Travers
2014	Reese Witherspoon	Wild	Cheryl Strayed
2014	Marion Cotillard	Two Days, One Night	Sandra Bya
2014	Felicity Jones	The Theory of Everything	Jane Wilde Hawking
2014	Julianne Moore †	Still Alice	Dr. Alice Howland
2014	Rosamund Pike	Gone Girl	Amy Elliott Dunne
2015	Brie Larson †	Room	Joy "Ma" Newsome
2015	Cate Blanchett	Carol	Carol Aird
2015	Carey Mulligan	Suffragette	Maud Watts
2015	Charlotte Rampling	45 Years	Kate Mercer
2015	Saoirse Ronan	Brooklyn	Eilis Lacey
2015	Charlize Theron	Mad Max: Fury Road	Imperator Furiosa
2016	Natalie Portman	Jackie	Jackie Kennedy
2016	Amy Adams	Arrival	Dr. Louise Banks
2016	Annette Bening	20th Century Women	Dorothea Fields
2016	Ruth Negga	Loving	Mildred Loving
2016	Emma Stone †	La La Land	Mia Dolan
2017	Sally Hawkins	The Shape of Water	Elisa Esposito
2017	Frances McDormand †	Three Billboards Outside Ebbing, Missouri	Mildred Hayes
2017	Margot Robbie	I, Tonya	Tonya Harding
2017	Saoirse Ronan	Lady Bird	Christine "Lady Bird" McPherson
2017	Meryl Streep	The Post	Katharine Graham
2018	Olivia Colman †	The Favourite	Queen Anne
2018	Glenn Close	The Wife	Joan Castleman
2018	Lady Gaga	A Star Is Born	Ally Maine
2018	Nicole Kidman	Destroyer	Erin Bell
2018	Melissa McCarthy	Can You Ever Forgive Me?	Lee Israel
2019	Scarlett Johansson	Marriage Story	Nicole Barber
2019	Awkwafina	The Farewell	Billi Wang
2019	Lupita Nyong'o	Us	Adelaide Wilson / Red
2019	Saoirse Ronan	Little Women	Josephine "Jo" March
2019	Charlize Theron	Bombshell	Megyn Kelly
2019	Renée Zellweger †	Judy	Judy Garland

=== 2020s ===
Year	Winner and nominees	Film	Role
2020	Carey Mulligan	Promising Young Woman	Cassandra "Cassie" Thomas
2020	Viola Davis	Ma Rainey's Black Bottom	Ma Rainey
2020	Andra Day	The United States vs. Billie Holiday	Billie Holiday
2020	Vanessa Kirby	Pieces of a Woman	Martha Weiss
2020	Frances McDormand †	Nomadland	Fern
2021	Kristen Stewart	Spencer	Diana, Princess of Wales
2021	Olivia Colman	The Lost Daughter	Leda Caruso
2021	Jessica Chastain †	The Eyes of Tammy Faye	Tammy Faye Bakker
2021	Lady Gaga	House of Gucci	Patrizia Reggiani
2021	Nicole Kidman	Being the Ricardos	Lucille Ball
2022	Cate Blanchett	Tár	Lydia Tár
2022	Viola Davis	The Woman King	General Nanisca
2022	Danielle Deadwyler	Till	Mamie Till-Mobley
2022	Michelle Williams	The Fabelmans	Mitzi Schildkraut-Fabelman
2022	Michelle Yeoh †	Everything Everywhere All at Once	Evelyn Quan Wang
2023	Lily Gladstone	Killers of the Flower Moon	Mollie Kyle
2023	Sandra Hüller	Anatomy of a Fall	Sandra Voyter
2023	Greta Lee	Past Lives	Nora Moon
2023	Carey Mulligan	Maestro	Felicia Montealegre Bernstein
2023	Emma Stone †	Poor Things	Bella Baxter
2024	Mikey Madison †	Anora	Anora "Ani" Mikheeva
2024	Demi Moore	The Substance	Elisabeth Sparkle
2024	Karla Sofía Gascón	Emilia Pérez	Emilia Pérez / Juan "Manitas" Del Monte
2024	Angelina Jolie	Maria	Maria Callas
2024	Marianne Jean-Baptiste	Hard Truths	Pansey
2024	Nicole Kidman	Babygirl	Romy Mathis
