= National Board of Review Award for Best Actor =

American movie award

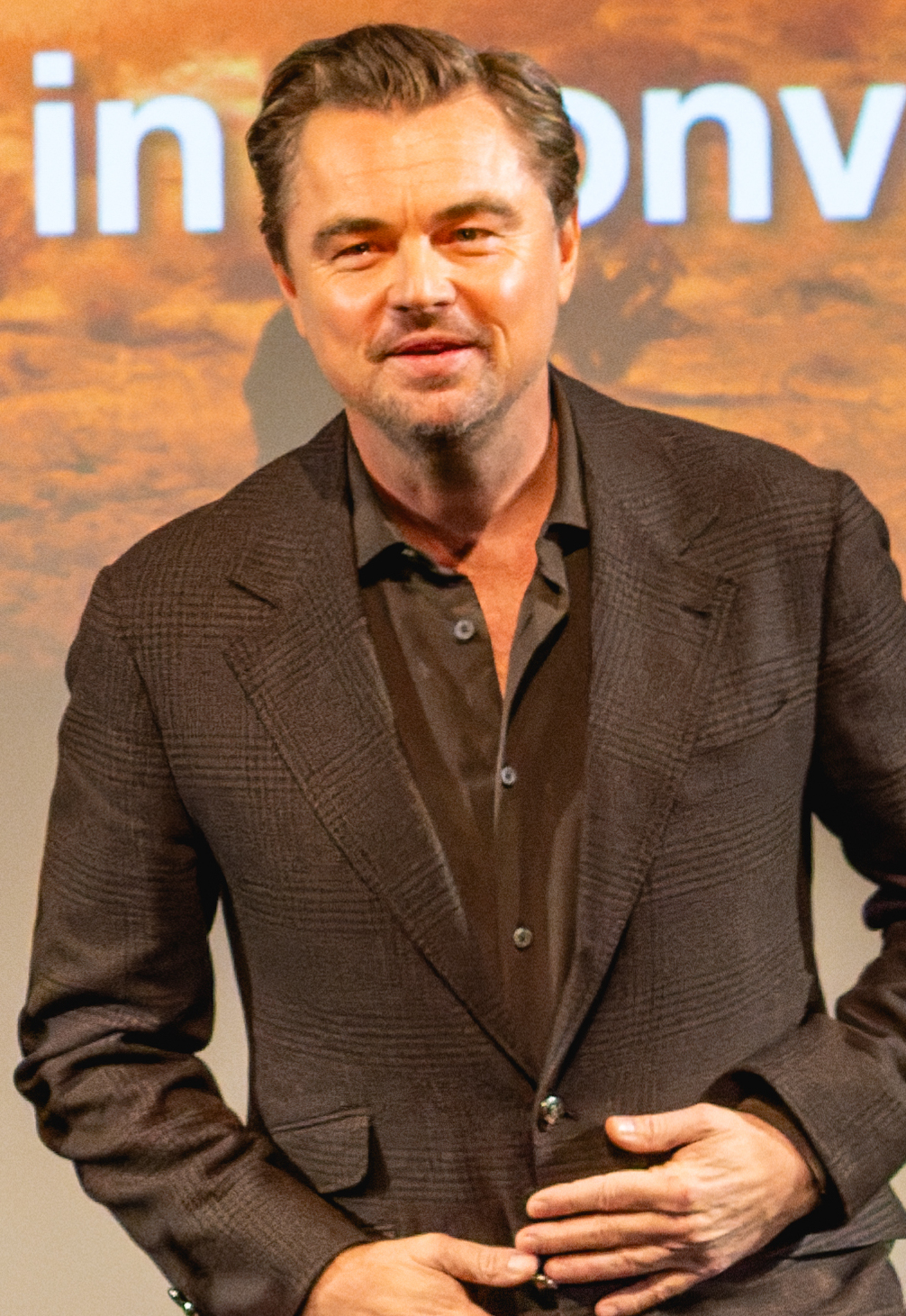
- 2025 recipient: Leonardo DiCaprio
- Awarded for: Best Performance by an Actor in a Leading Role
- Country: United States
- Presented by: National Board of Review
- First award: Ray Milland; The Lost Weekend (1945)
- Currently held by: Leonardo DiCaprio; One Battle After Another (2025)
- Website: nationalboardofreview.org

The National Board of Review Award for Best Actor is one of the annual film awards given (since 1945) by the National Board of Review of Motion Pictures.

== Winners ==
=== 1940s ===
Year	Winner	Film	Role
1945	Ray Milland	The Lost Weekend	Don Birnam
1946	Laurence Olivier	Henry V	King Henry V
1947	Michael Redgrave	Mourning Becomes Electra	Orin Mannon
1948	Walter Huston	The Treasure of the Sierra Madre	Howard
1949	Ralph Richardson	The Fallen Idol	Baines
1949	Ralph Richardson	The Heiress	Austin Sloper

=== 1950s ===
Year	Winner	Film	Role
1950	Alec Guinness	Kind Hearts and Coronets	Various
1951	Richard Basehart	Fourteen Hours	Robert Cosick
1952	Ralph Richardson	Breaking the Sound Barrier	John Ridgefield
1953	James Mason	The Desert Rats	Field Marshal Erwin von Rommel
1953	James Mason	Face to Face	The Captain
1953	James Mason	Julius Caesar	Brutus
1953	James Mason	The Man Between	Ivo Kern
1954	Bing Crosby	The Country Girl	Frank Elgin
1955	Ernest Borgnine	Marty	Marty Piletti
1956	Yul Brynner	Anastasia	General Sergei Pavlovich Bounine
1956	Yul Brynner	The King and I	King Mongkut of Siam
1956	Yul Brynner	The Ten Commandments	Pharaoh Rameses II
1957	Alec Guinness	The Bridge on the River Kwai	Lieutenant Colonel Nicholson
1958	Spencer Tracy	The Old Man and the Sea	The Old Man / Narrator
1959	Victor Sjöström	Wild Strawberries	Professor Isak Borg

=== 1960s ===
Year	Winner	Film	Role
1960	Robert Mitchum	Home from the Hill	Wade Hunnicutt
1960	Robert Mitchum	The Sundowners	Paddy Carmody
1961	Albert Finney	Saturday Night and Sunday Morning	Arthur Seaton
1962	Jason Robards, Jr.	Long Day's Journey Into Night	James Tyrone, Jr.
1962	Jason Robards, Jr.	Tender Is the Night	Dick Diver
1963	Rex Harrison	Cleopatra	Julius Caesar
1964	Anthony Quinn	Zorba the Greek (Alexis Zorbas)	Alexis Zorba
1965	Lee Marvin	Cat Ballou	Kid Shelleen / Tim Strawn
1965	Lee Marvin	Ship of Fools	Bill Tenny
1966	Paul Scofield	A Man for All Seasons	Sir Thomas More
1967	Peter Finch	Far from the Madding Crowd	William Boldwood
1968	Cliff Robertson	Charly	Charly Gordon
1969	Peter O'Toole	Goodbye, Mr. Chips	Arthur Chipping, MA (Oxon), Latin Master

=== 1970s ===
Year	Winner	Film	Role
1970	George C. Scott	Patton	George S. Patton, Jr.
1971	Gene Hackman	The French Connection	Detective Jimmy "Popeye" Doyle
1972	Peter O'Toole	Man of La Mancha	Don Quixote de La Mancha / Miguel de Cervantes / Alonso Quijana
1972	Peter O'Toole	The Ruling Class	Jack Gurney, 14th Earl of Gurney
1973	Al Pacino	Serpico	Francesco "Frank" Serpico
1973	Robert Ryan	The Iceman Cometh	Larry Slade
1974	Gene Hackman	The Conversation	Harry Caul
1975	Jack Nicholson	One Flew Over the Cuckoo's Nest	Randle "R.P." McMurphy
1976	David Carradine	Bound for Glory	Woodrow "Woody" Guthrie
1977	John Travolta	Saturday Night Fever	Anthony "Tony" Manero
1978	Jon Voight	Coming Home	Luke Martin
1978	Laurence Olivier	The Boys from Brazil	Ezra Lieberman
1979	Peter Sellers	Being There	Chance

=== 1980s ===
Year	Winner	Film	Role
1980	Robert De Niro	Raging Bull	Jake LaMotta
1981	Henry Fonda	On Golden Pond	Norman Thayer
1982	Ben Kingsley	Gandhi	Mahatma Gandhi
1983	Tom Conti	Merry Christmas, Mr. Lawrence	John Lawrence
1983	Tom Conti	Reuben, Reuben	Gowan McGland
1984	Victor Banerjee	A Passage to India	Dr. Aziz H. Ahmed
1985	William Hurt and Raúl Juliá	Kiss of the Spider Woman	Luis Molina and Valentin Arregui
1986	Paul Newman	The Color of Money	Fast Eddie Felson
1987	Michael Douglas	Wall Street	Gordon Gekko
1988	Gene Hackman	Mississippi Burning	Agent Rupert Anderson
1989	Morgan Freeman	Driving Miss Daisy	Hoke Colburn

=== 1990s ===
Year	Winner	Film	Role
1990	Robert De Niro and Robin Williams	Awakenings	Leonard Lowe and Dr. Malcolm Sayer
1991	Warren Beatty	Bugsy	Benjamin "Bugsy" Siegel
1992	Jack Lemmon	Glengarry Glen Ross	Shelley "The Machine" Levene
1993	Anthony Hopkins	The Remains of the Day	James Stevens
1993	Anthony Hopkins	Shadowlands	Clive "C. S." Lewis
1994	Tom Hanks	Forrest Gump	Forrest Gump
1995	Nicolas Cage	Leaving Las Vegas	Ben Sanderson
1996	Tom Cruise	Jerry Maguire	Jerry Maguire
1997	Jack Nicholson	As Good as It Gets	Melvin Udall
1998	Ian McKellen	Gods and Monsters	James Whale
1999	Russell Crowe	The Insider	Dr. Jeffrey Wigand

=== 2000s ===
Year	Winner	Film	Role
2000	Javier Bardem	Before Night Falls	Reinaldo Arenas
2001	Billy Bob Thornton	Bandits	Terry Lee Collins
2001	Billy Bob Thornton	The Man Who Wasn't There	Ed Crane
2001	Billy Bob Thornton	Monster's Ball	Hank Grotowski
2002	Campbell Scott	Roger Dodger	Roger Swanson
2003	Sean Penn	Mystic River	Jimmy Markum
2004	Jamie Foxx	Ray	Ray Charles
2005	Philip Seymour Hoffman	Capote	Truman Capote
2006	Forest Whitaker	The Last King of Scotland	Idi Amin
2007	George Clooney	Michael Clayton	Michael Clayton
2008	Clint Eastwood	Gran Torino	Walt Kowalski
2009	George Clooney	Up in the Air	Ryan Bingham
2009	Morgan Freeman	Invictus	Nelson Mandela

=== 2010s ===
Year	Winner	Film	Role
2010	Jesse Eisenberg	The Social Network	Mark Zuckerberg
2011	George Clooney	The Descendants	Matt King
2012	Bradley Cooper	Silver Linings Playbook	Patrick "Pat" Solitano, Jr.
2013	Bruce Dern	Nebraska	Woodrow "Woody" Grant
2014	Oscar Isaac	A Most Violent Year	Abel Morales
2014	Michael Keaton	Birdman	Riggan Thomson
2015	Matt Damon	The Martian	Mark Watney
2016	Casey Affleck	Manchester by the Sea	Lee Chandler
2017	Tom Hanks	The Post	Ben Bradlee
2018	Viggo Mortensen	Green Book	Frank "Tony Lip" Vallelonga
2019	Adam Sandler	Uncut Gems	Howard Ratner

=== 2020s ===
Year	Winner	Film	Role
2020	Riz Ahmed	Sound of Metal	Ruben Stone
2021	Will Smith	King Richard	Richard Williams
2022	Colin Farrell	The Banshees of Inisherin	Pádraic Súilleabháin
2023	Paul Giamatti	The Holdovers	Paul Hunham
2024	Daniel Craig	Queer	William Lee
2025	Leonardo DiCaprio	One Battle After Another	"Ghetto" Pat Calhoun / "Rocketman" / Bob Ferguson

== Multiple awards ==
3 wins

- George Clooney (2007, 2009, 2011)
- Gene Hackman (1971, 1974, 1988)

2 wins

- Robert De Niro (1980, 1990)
- Morgan Freeman (1989, 2009)
- Alec Guinness (1950, 1957)
- Tom Hanks (1994, 2017)
- Jack Nicholson (1975, 1997)
- Laurence Olivier (1946, 1978)
- Peter O'Toole (1969, 1972)
- Ralph Richardson (1949, 1952)

== See also ==
- New York Film Critics Circle Award for Best Actor
- National Society of Film Critics Award for Best Actor
- Los Angeles Film Critics Association Award for Best Actor
