= Dallas–Fort Worth Film Critics Association Awards 2001 =

Annual US film awards ceremony

7th Dallas-Fort Worth Film Critics Association Awards
- Date: January 3, 2002
- Location: Dallas, Texas
- Country: United States
- Presented by: Dallas–Fort Worth Film Critics Association
- Website: dfwfilmcritics.net

The 7th Dallas–Fort Worth Film Critics Association Awards, honoring the best in film for 2001, were given on January 3, 2002.

== Top 10 films ==
1. A Beautiful Mind (Academy Award for Best Picture)
2. Moulin Rouge!
3. Memento
4. The Lord of the Rings: The Fellowship of the Ring
5. In the Bedroom
6. Shrek
7. The Man Who Wasn't There
8. Mulholland Drive
9. Life as a House
10. Amélie (Le fabuleux destin d'Amélie Poulain)

== Winners ==
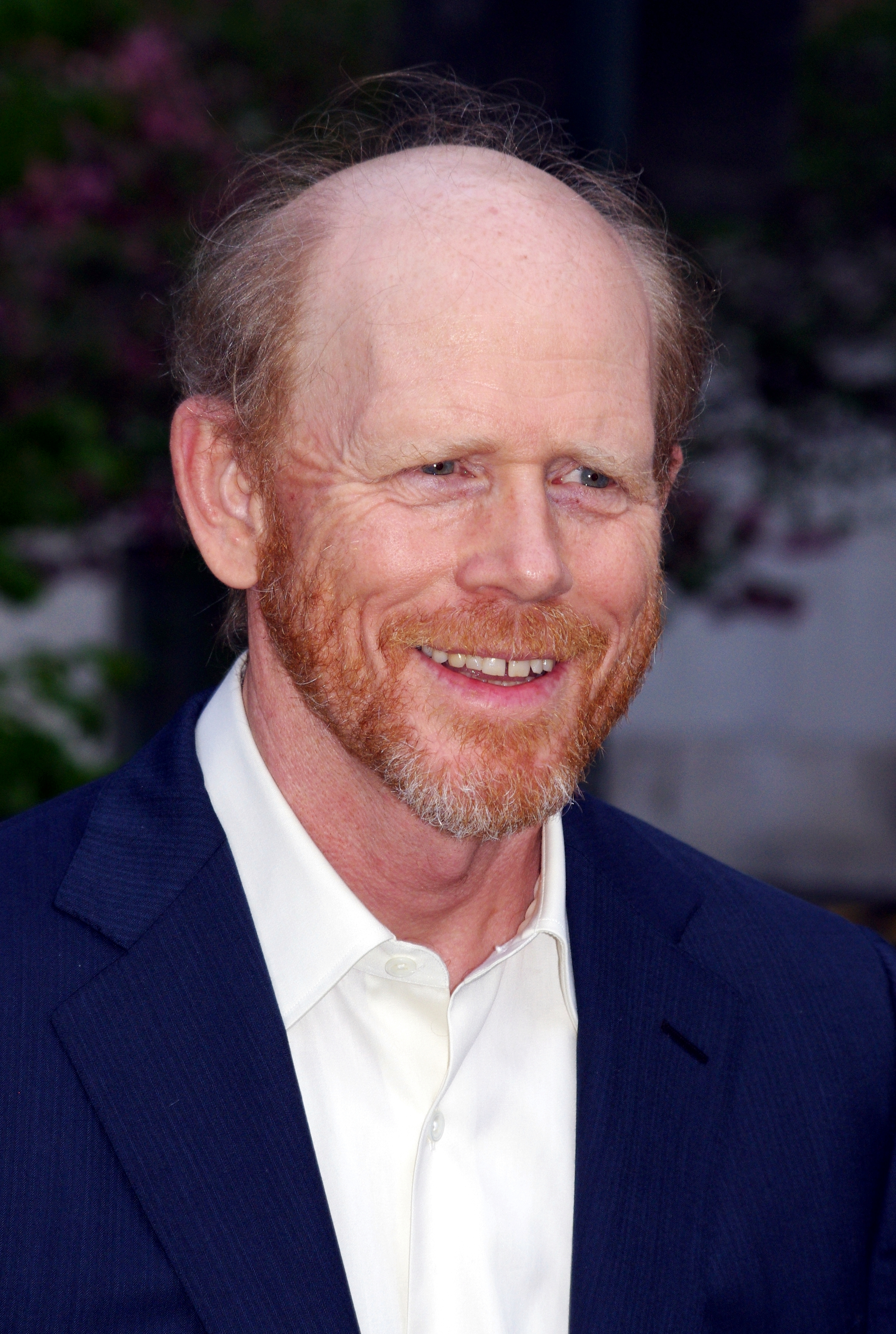
Ron Howard, Best Director winner

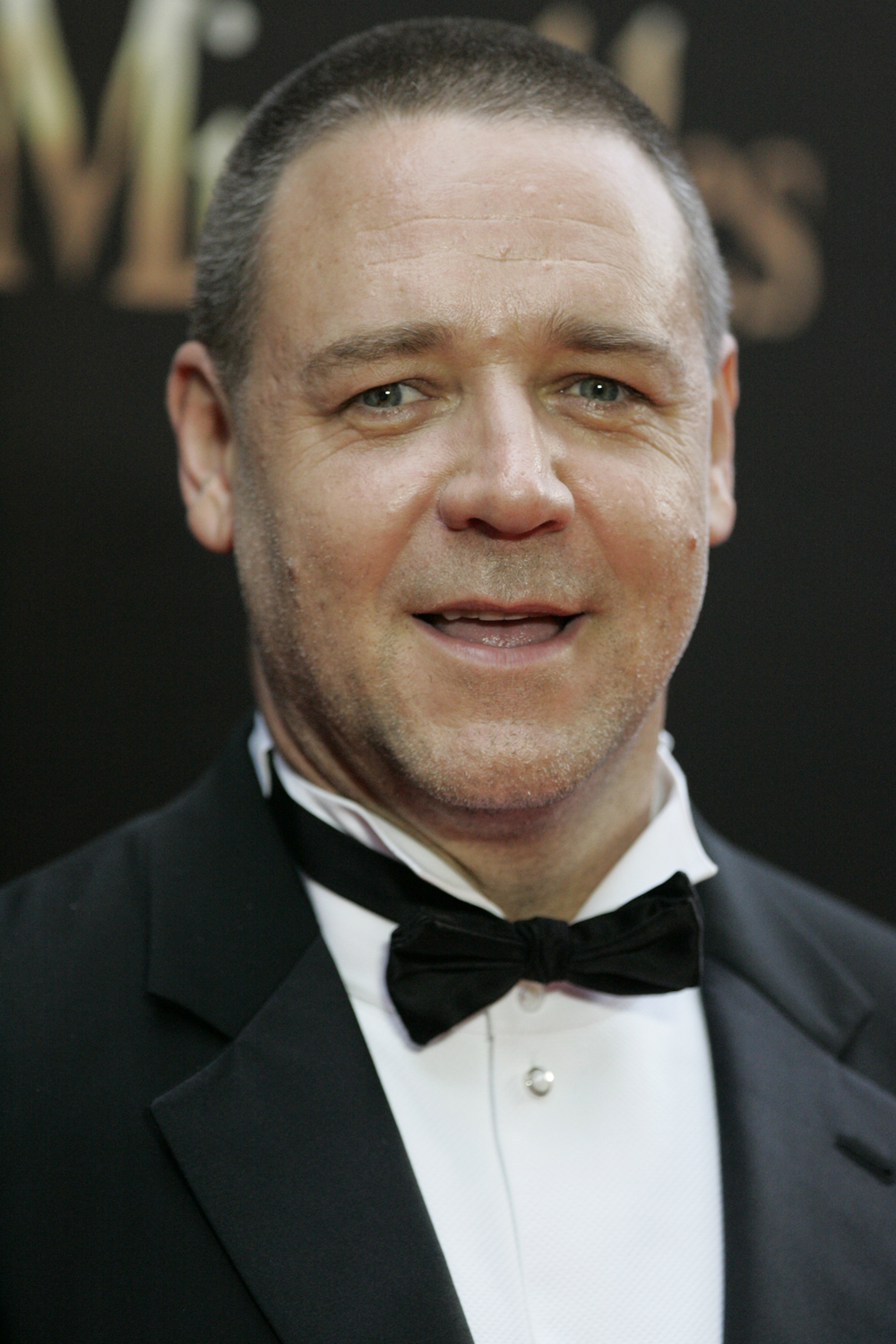
Russell Crowe, Best Actor winner

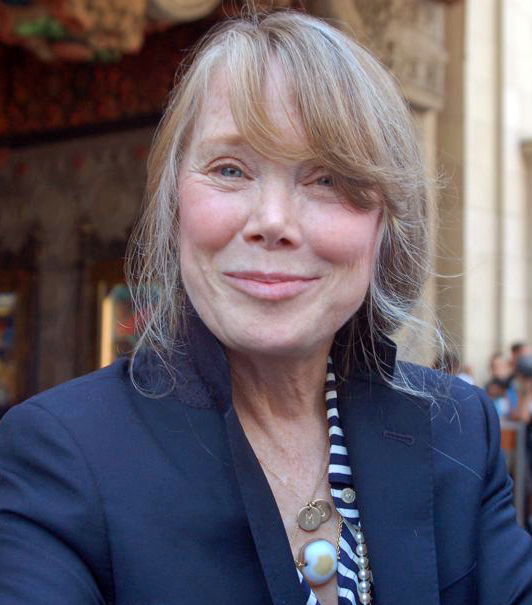
Sissy Spacek, Best Actress winner

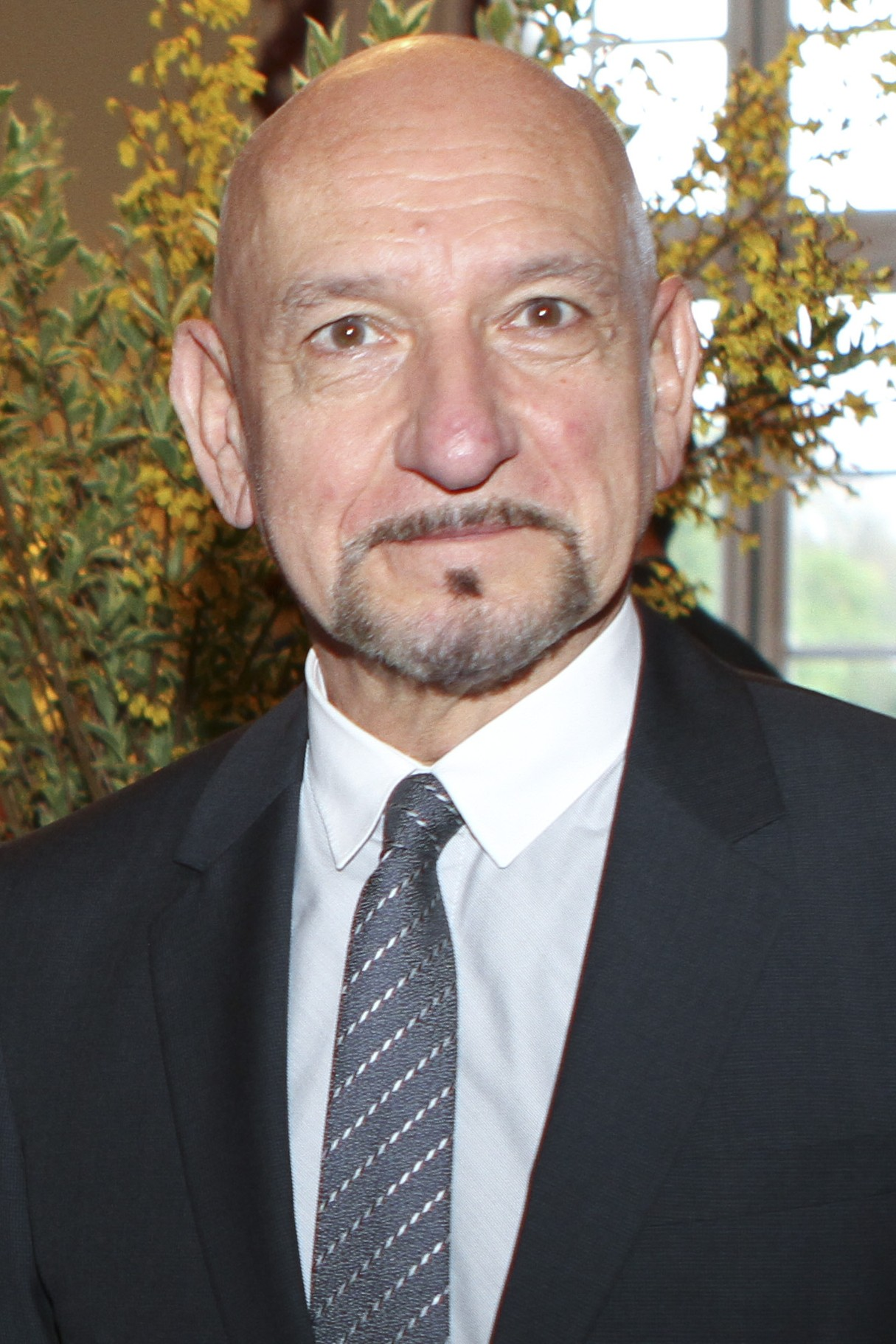
Ben Kingsley, Best Supporting Actor winner

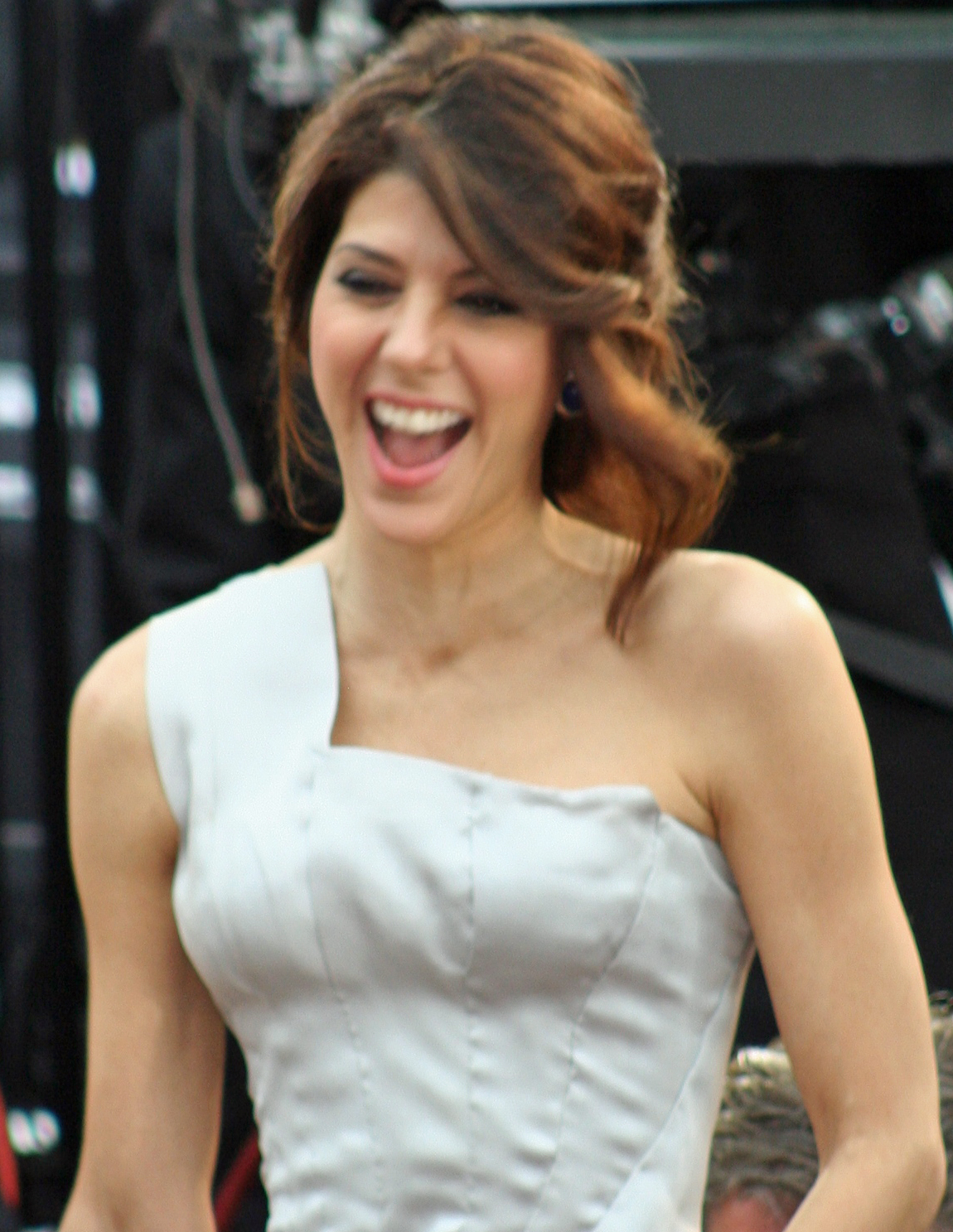
Marisa Tomei, Best Supporting Actress winner

- Best Actor:
  - Russell Crowe – A Beautiful Mind
- Best Actress:
  - Sissy Spacek – In the Bedroom
- Best Animated Film:
  - Shrek
- Best Cinematography:
  - The Lord of the Rings: The Fellowship of the Ring – Andrew Lesnie
- Best Director:
  - Ron Howard – A Beautiful Mind
- Best Film:
  - A Beautiful Mind
- Best Foreign Language Film:
  - Amélie (Le fabuleux destin d'Amélie Poulain) • France
- Best Supporting Actor:
  - Ben Kingsley – Sexy Beast
- Best Supporting Actress:
  - Marisa Tomei – In the Bedroom
- Worst Film:
  - Freddy Got Fingered
