= Chicago Film Critics Association Awards 2001 =

Annual US film awards ceremony

14th CFCA Awards

February 25, 2002

Best Film:
Mulholland Dr.

The 14th Chicago Film Critics Association Awards, given on 25 February 2002, honored the finest achievements in 2001 filmmaking.

== Winners ==
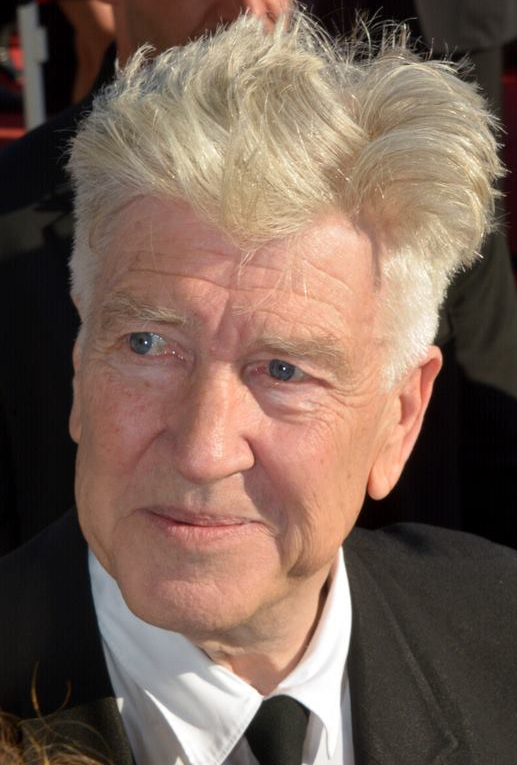
David Lynch, Best Director winner

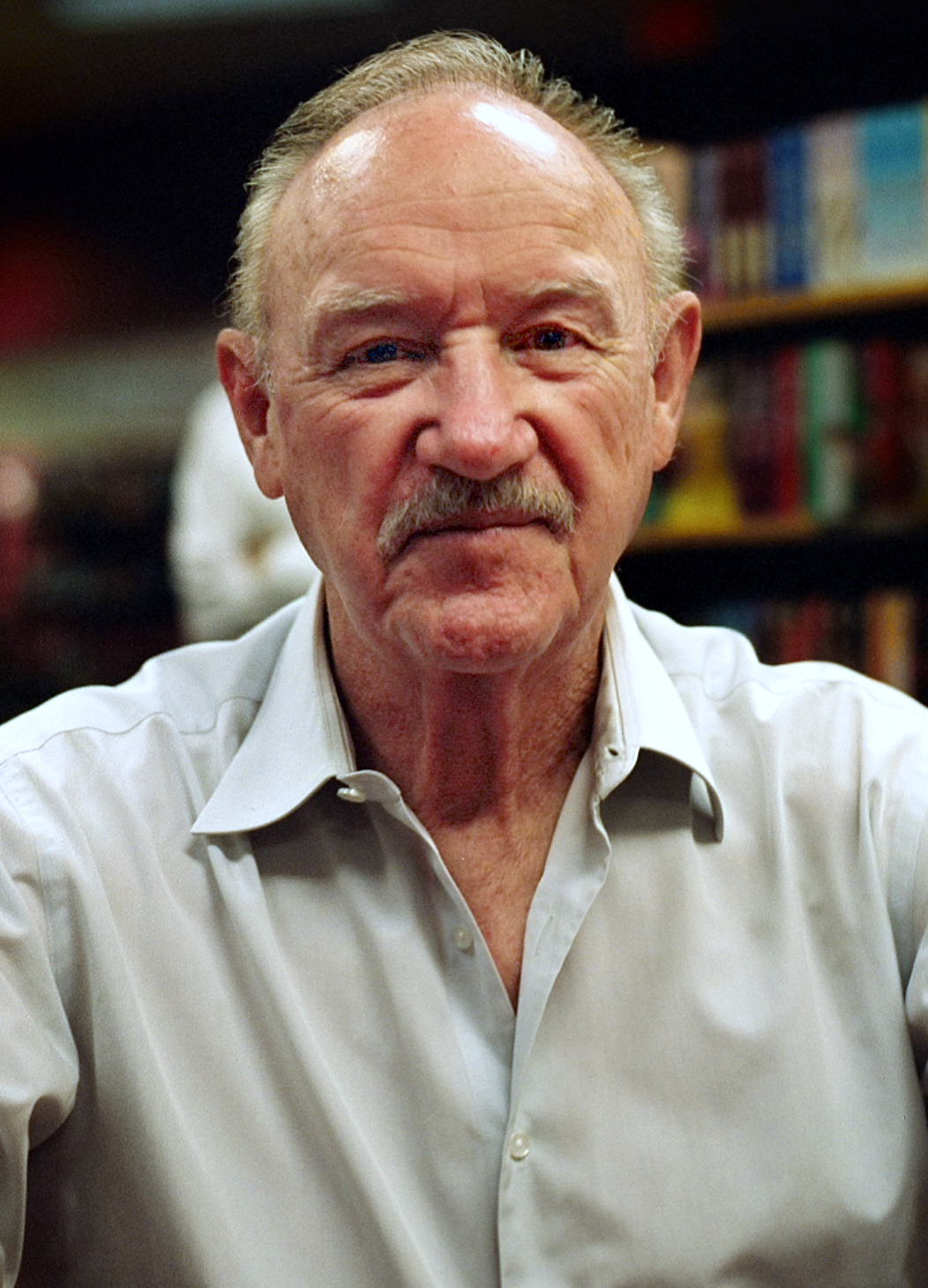
Gene Hackman, Best Actor winner

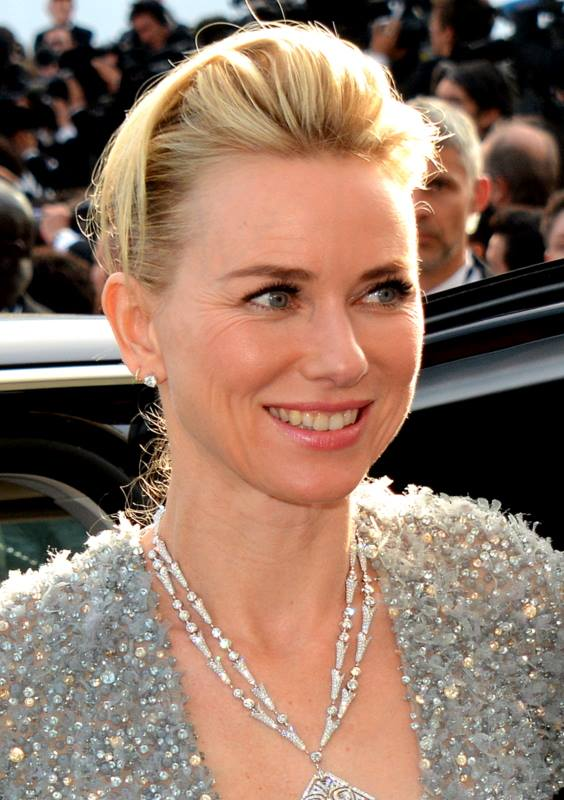
Naomi Watts, Best Actress winner

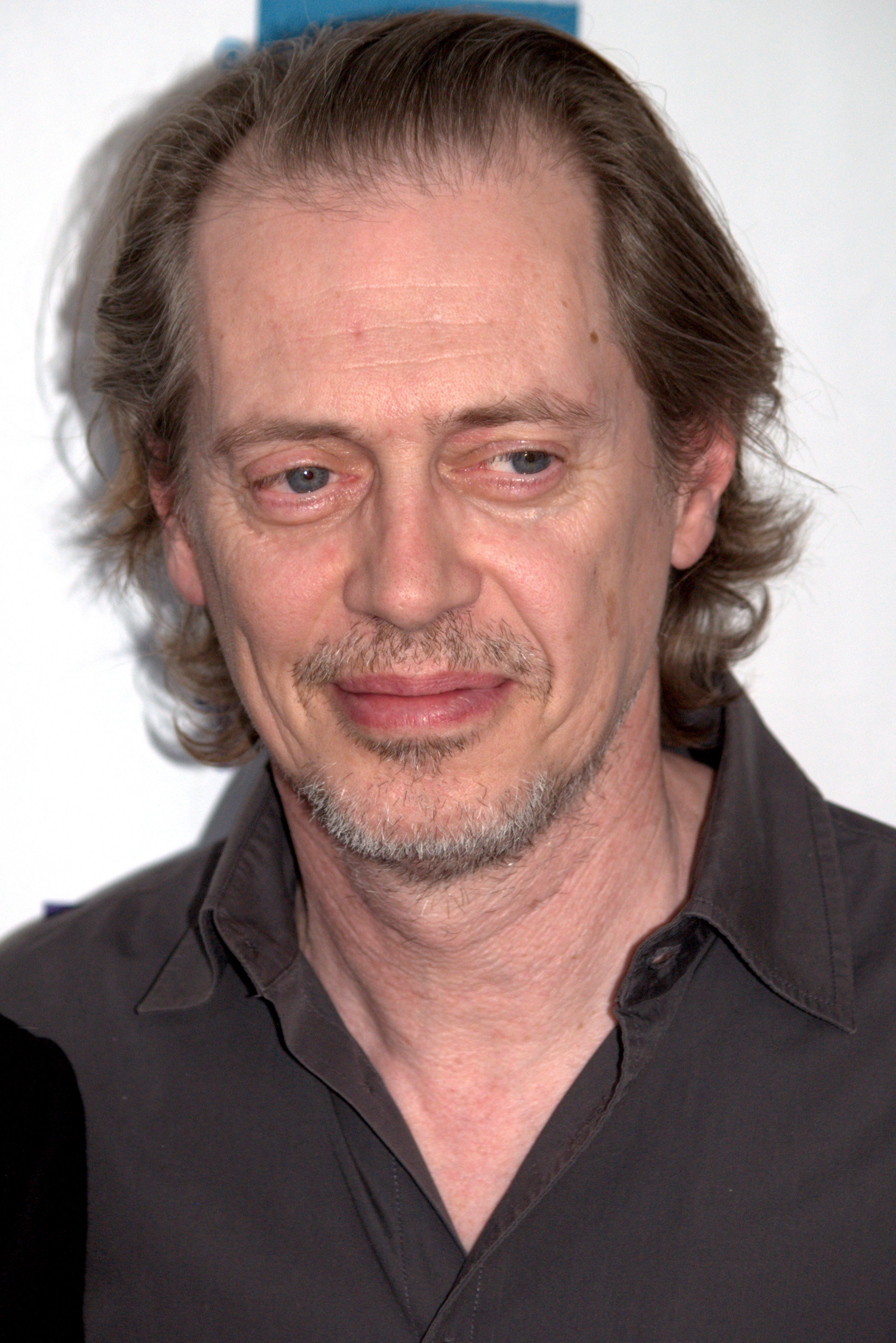
Steve Buscemi, Best Supporting Actor winner

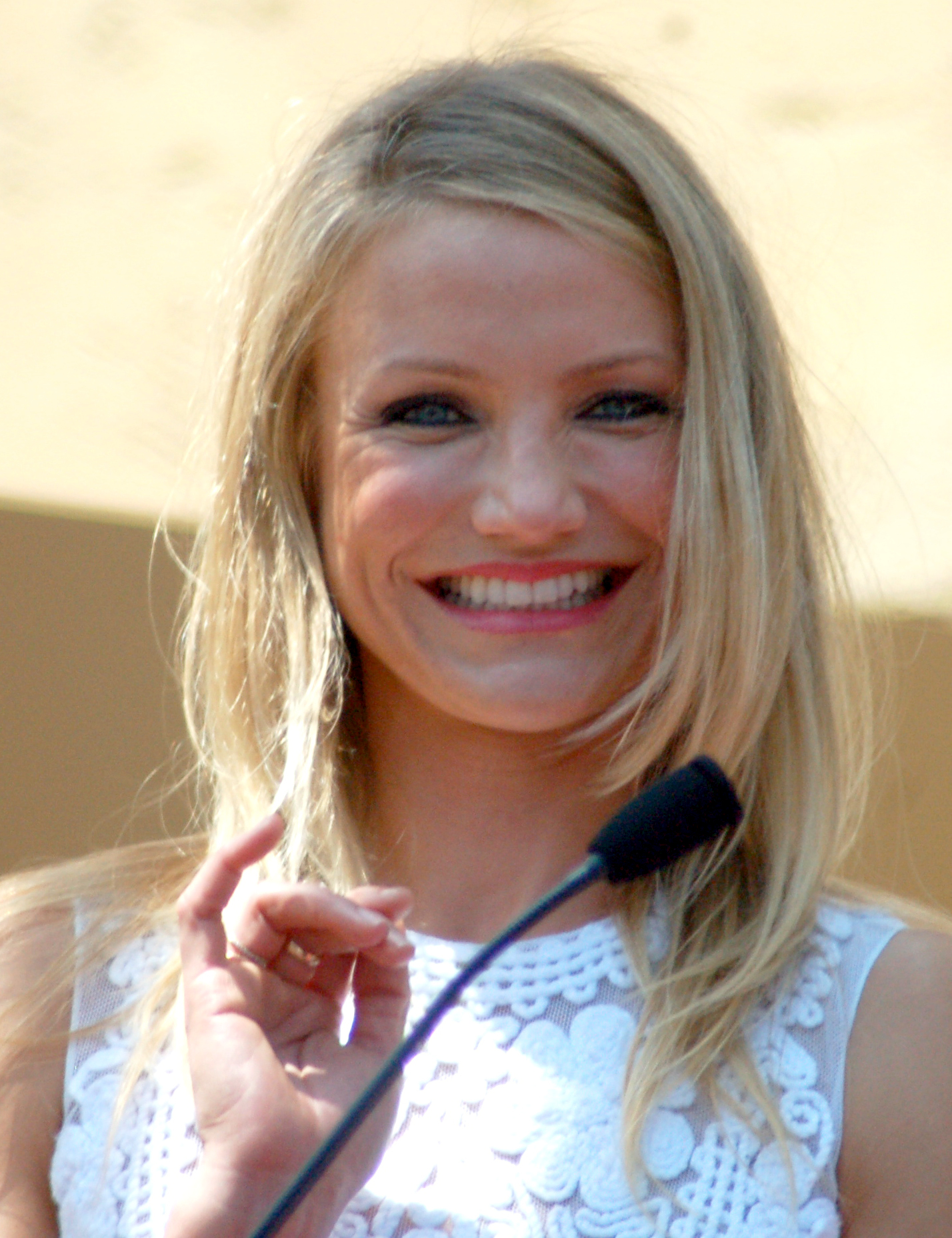
Cameron Diaz, Best Supporting Actress winner

- Best Actor:
  - Gene Hackman - The Royal Tenenbaums
- Best Actress:
  - Naomi Watts - Mulholland Drive
- Best Cinematography:
  - The Lord of the Rings: The Fellowship of the Ring - Andrew Lesnie
- Best Director:
  - David Lynch - Mulholland Drive
- Best Film:
  - Mulholland Drive
- Best Foreign Language Film:
  - Le fabuleux destin d'Amélie Poulain (Amélie), France
- Best Score:
  - "The Lord of the Rings: The Fellowship of the Ring" - Howard Shore
- Best Screenplay:
  - Memento - Christopher Nolan
- Best Supporting Actor:
  - Steve Buscemi - Ghost World
- Best Supporting Actress:
  - Cameron Diaz - Vanilla Sky
- Most Promising Director:
  - Todd Field - In the Bedroom
- Most Promising Newcomer:
  - Audrey Tautou - Amélie
