= In the Bedroom =

2001 film by Todd Field

- Theatrical release poster
- Directed by: Todd Field
- Screenplay by: Todd Field; Robert Festinger
- Based on: "Killings" by Andre Dubus
- Produced by: Todd Field; Ross Katz; Graham Leader
- Starring: Sissy Spacek; Tom Wilkinson; Nick Stahl; William Mapother; William Wise; Celia Weston; Marisa Tomei
- Cinematography: Antonio Calvache
- Edited by: Frank Reynolds
- Music by: Thomas Newman
- Production companies: Good Machine; Eastern Standard Film Company; GreeneStreet Films
- Distributed by: Miramax Films
- Release dates: January 19, 2001 (Sundance); November 23, 2001 (United States)
- Running time: 131 minutes
- Country: United States
- Language: English
- Budget: $1.7 million
- Box office: $44.8 million

In the Bedroom is a 2001 American drama film directed by Todd Field from a screenplay by Field and Robert Festinger, based on the 1979 short story "Killings" by Andre Dubus. It stars Sissy Spacek, Tom Wilkinson, Nick Stahl, Marisa Tomei, and William Mapother. The film centers on the inner dynamics of a family in transition. Matt Fowler (Wilkinson) is a doctor practicing in Maine and is married to Ruth Fowler (Spacek), a music teacher. Their son Frank (Stahl) is involved in a love affair with an older single mother, Natalie Strout (Tomei).

The title refers to the rear compartment of a lobster trap known as the "bedroom" and how it can hold only two lobsters before the lobsters begin to turn on each other. In the Bedroom premiered at the 2001 Sundance Film Festival. It was theatrically released in limited theatres on November 23, 2001, and grossed $44.8 million against a $1.7 million budget. The film was praised for Field's direction, its screenplay and the performances (particularly those of Spacek, Wilkinson, Stahl and Tomei).

In the Bedroom received 5 nominations at the 74th Academy Awards; Best Picture, Best Adapted Screenplay, Best Actress (for Spacek), Best Actor (for Wilkinson) and Best Supporting Actress (for Tomei). The film also earned Spacek and Wilkinson nominations for Best Actress and Best Actor respectively at the 55th British Academy Film Awards and the 8th Screen Actors Guild Awards. Spacek's performance in the film earned her the Golden Globe Award for Best Actress in a Motion Picture – Drama and the Critics' Choice Movie Award for Best Actress. Moreover, the film was chosen by the American Film Institute as one of the top ten films of the year while Spacek's performance was named the best female performance of the year.

== Plot ==
In coastal Rockport, Maine, Matt and Ruth Fowler enjoy a happy marriage and a good relationship with their son Frank, a recent college graduate home for the summer. Frank has fallen in love with a divorced older woman with children, Natalie Strout; Ruth is concerned about the relationship, while Matt thinks it is only a fling. The family struggles to communicate their feelings to one another, especially regarding Frank's relationship and schooling.

Frank is about to begin graduate school for architecture but is considering staying in town to continue working as a fisherman and to be near Natalie and her kids. Natalie's ex-husband, Richard Strout, tries to find a way into his ex-wife and children's lives, going to increasingly violent lengths to get his intentions across to Natalie, including assaulting Frank.

Frank rushes to Natalie's home one evening after receiving a frightened phone call from one of her children. He arrives to find the living room trashed and Natalie in distress. She tells him Richard just left, but he returns almost immediately. Natalie takes the boys upstairs, and Frank insists through the locked front door that Richard leave. He feigns doing so, only to break in through the back door with a handgun; in the ensuing scuffle, Frank is shot and killed.

Though equally devastated, Matt and Ruth grieve in different ways, with Matt putting on a brave face and quickly returning to work, while Ruth becomes reclusive and quiet. The couple retreat with friends Willis and Katie Grinnel to a secluded cottage for a weekend, but Ruth is distant and Matt begins to drink heavily.

At Richard's bail hearing, Natalie is pressed by his lawyer over whether she saw the shooting, as she initially testified when police arrived on the scene, and she tearfully shakes her head, as she only heard what happened. The tension between Matt and Ruth increases when their lawyer informs them that because of the change from Natalie's original testimony, Richard was allowed out on bail, and his defense will argue that Frank's death was an accident, meaning Richard will most likely be charged with accidental manslaughter and only serve five to ten years in prison. The couple begin to see Richard around town.

Matt approaches Natalie at work to check in on her and the two have a well-intentioned but strained conversation. Matt takes the boat out to catch lobsters to feel a connection with Frank, but he struggles with it and is pinched by a lobster, leaving a bleeding wound on one finger which Matt bandages. Natalie approaches Ruth at work and attempts to apologize, but Ruth slaps her before dismissively returning to her work. Natalie leaves in tears. Later that day, Ruth runs into Richard at the grocery store.

When she returns home, an argument erupts between the couple in which they emotionally savage each other; Matt lambastes Ruth for being overbearing in Frank's youth, while Ruth chastises Matt for showing little grief for their deceased son and encouraging his relationship with Natalie because of his own vicarious lust for her. After a young girl selling candy for a fundraiser interrupts them, Matt takes back what he said to Ruth, who apologizes in turn and, breaking down, tells Matt about seeing Natalie and Richard. They embrace and find common ground in their grief. Matt and Willis spend the evening drinking and lamenting the injustice, and Willis asks if the couple have considered moving or doing anything about Richard.

Matt abducts Richard at gunpoint, saying he's arranged for Richard to jump bail and leave the state, so as to spare them the pain of seeing him in Camden. He forces Richard to pack clothes for warm weather and plants a train schedule in his apartment. He then makes Richard drive them to the Grinnel cabin, where Willis is waiting with another vehicle. He begins to load Richard's belongings, but Matt hesitates, then shoots Richard, killing him. Willis admonishes Matt for not following their plan to kill Richard in the woods, and Matt responds that he couldn't wait. They bury Richard's body deep in the woods but are stuck unexpectedly at a bridge crossing on their return home. Willis laments that this cost them nearly an hour, meaning they will arrive back in town just after sunrise instead of in darkness.

Matt returns home to find Ruth awake. She asks, "Did you do it?" Matt appears troubled and unresponsive. He climbs into bed and turns away from her. She asks if he's okay, and Matt haltingly describes a photo he saw in Richard's apartment of him with Natalie in a loving embrace, but cannot explain why it affected him. At length Ruth gets up to make coffee, calling "Matt, do you want coffee?" from the kitchen, but he doesn't answer. Matt removes the bandage from his finger and finds the wound scabbed over.

== Cast ==
- Sissy Spacek as Ruth Fowler
- Tom Wilkinson as Matt Fowler
- Nick Stahl as Frank Fowler
- Marisa Tomei as Natalie Strout
- William Mapother as Richard Strout
- Celia Weston as Katie Grinnel
- Karen Allen as Marla Keyes
- Deborah Derecktor as Janelle
- William Wise as Willis Grinnel
- Justin Ashforth as Tim Bryson
- Camden Munson as Jason Strout
- Frank T. Wells as Henry
- Kevin Chapman as Tim's Friend

== Production ==
Principal photography began on 1 June 2000 and completed on 6 July 2000.

== Release ==
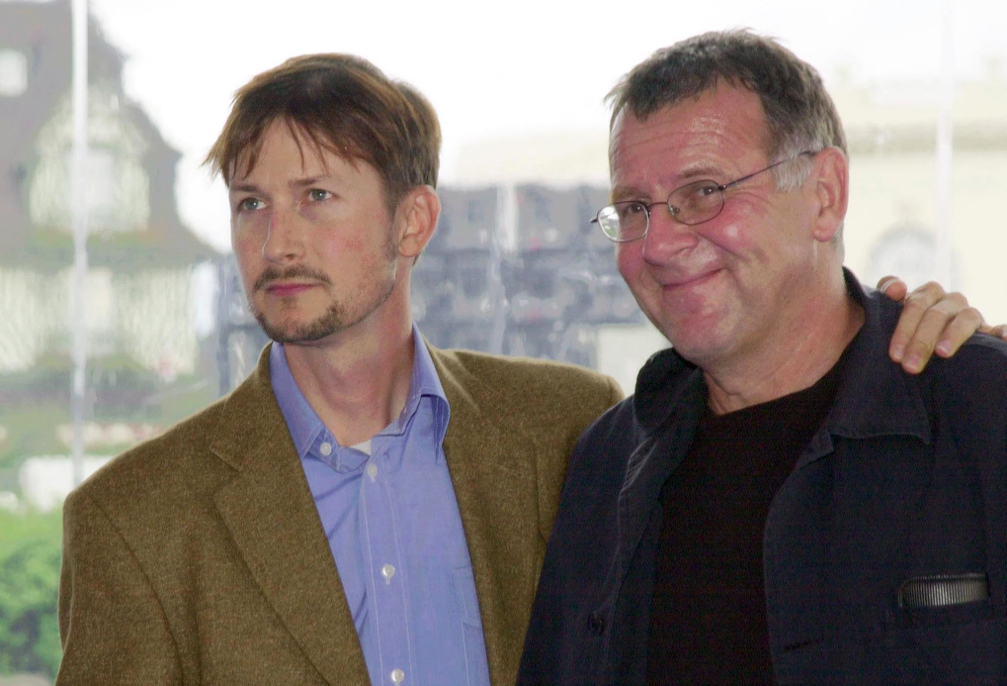
Todd Field and Tom Wilkinson at the Deauville Film Festival in September 2001

In the Bedroom made its debut at the 2001 Sundance Film Festival. In a 2022 The New Yorker profile, director Todd Field recalled that when the film was acquired by Miramax Films, he was devastated, concerned that his film would be heavily re-edited by Harvey Weinstein. Field called Tom Cruise, a personal friend (and cousin of In the Bedroom actor William Mapother), who advised him not to give Weinstein any pushback, allow him to extensively re-edit, wait until the film tested poorly, then remind Weinstein of how well the film was initially received at Sundance. Field followed Cruise's advice and it worked.

Critic Dennis Lim wrote in the Village Voice:

Todd Field's debut feature, In the Bedroom, alighted on the snowy peaks of Sundance last January as if from another universe. Here was a small miracle of patience and composure, so starkly removed from everything the festival had come to represent that it seemed almost to herald the overdue coming-of-age of American independent film.

In the Bedroom was the first film that premiered at the Sundance Film Festival to receive an Academy Award nomination for Best Picture. It also received nominations for Best Actor, Best Actress, Best Supporting Actress, and Best Adapted screenplay, more nominations than any film to premiere at Sundance until Precious in 2009.

=== Box office ===
In the Bedroom was the second highest-grossing film that premiered at the Sundance Film Festival from 2000 to 2009, after Napoleon Dynamite. The film grossed a worldwide total of $44.8 million. It went on to become, at the time, the highest-grossing non-IMAX film in history never to reach the top 10 in a given week, and also one of the most successful films in history, with an expense-to-profit ratio of 1:25.

== Critical reception ==
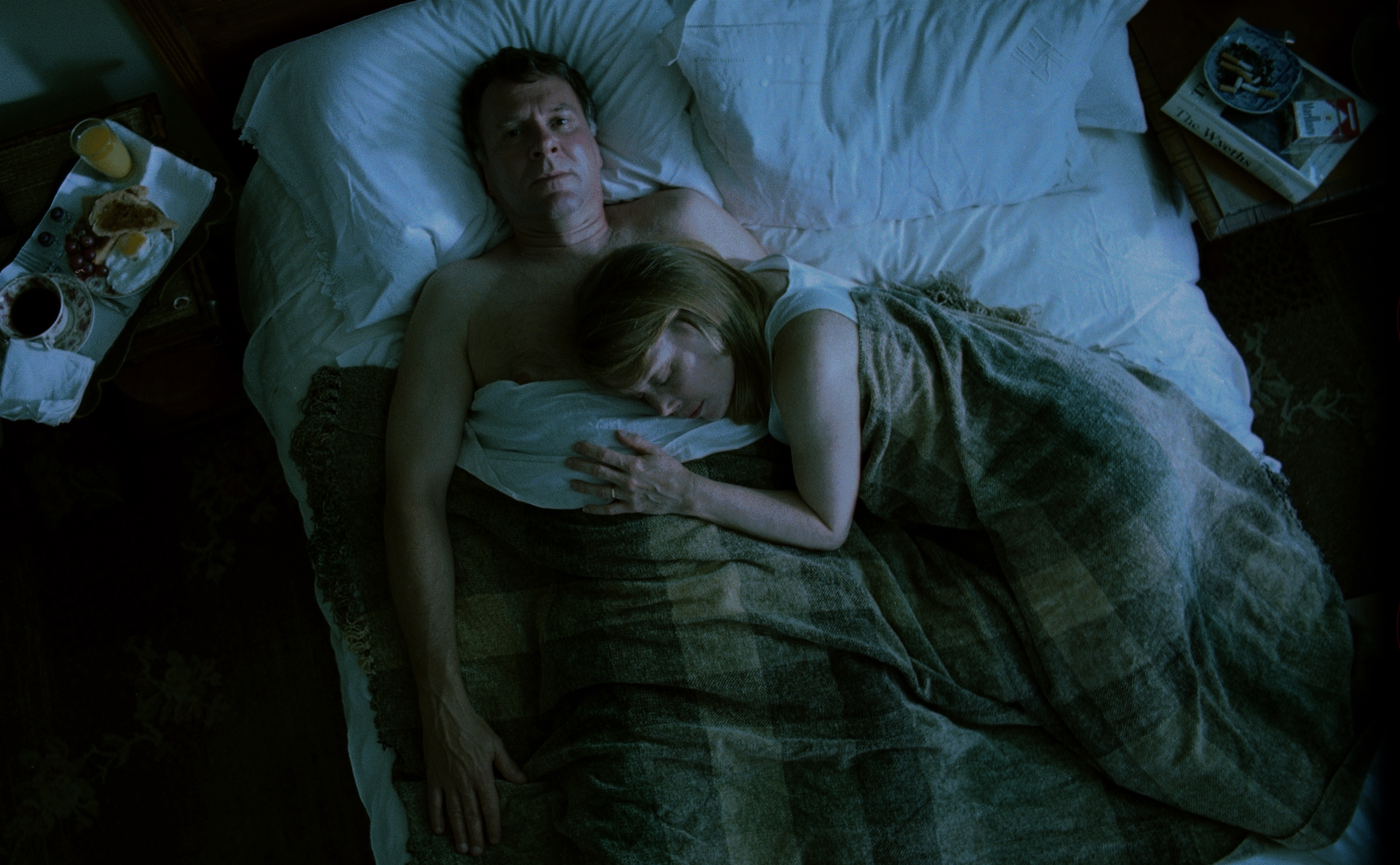
The performances of Sissy Spacek and Tom Wilkinson received critical acclaim, earning them Academy Award nominations for Best Actress and Best Actor respectively.

Upon its release, the film received critical acclaim for its direction, script, and performances, notably from Wilkinson and Spacek. On Rotten Tomatoes, the film has an approval rating of 93% based on 141 reviews, with an average score of 8.6/10. The site's consensus states "Expertly crafted and performed, In the Bedroom is a quietly wrenching portrayal of grief." Metacritic, which uses a weighted average, assigned the film a score of 86 out of 100 based on reviews from 31 critics, indicating "universal acclaim".

Stanley Kauffmann of The New Republic wrote, "In the Bedroom leaves us with the happy knowledge that with Field the American film scene, continually deplored as scraggly, can boast another admirable directing talent.

David Edelstein of Slate Magazine wrote, "it is the best movie of the last several years," and described it as "the most evocative, the most mysterious, the most inconsolably devastating." Edelstein said that the film "isn't over when you leave the theater", that it's "always going to be there," and called it a "masterpiece".

Neil Norman of The Evening Standard stated "It is apparent that Field has not only studied the masters of cinematic understatement, such as Ozu and Bergman, but that he fully understands their processes... Field's achievement is such a perfectly consummated marriage of intent and execution that he need never make another movie. I would not be alone, I think, in hoping he will make many more."

William Arnold of the Seattle Post-Intelligencer compared Field's direction to Kubrick's, saying that it "manages to feel both highly controlled and effortlessly spontaneous at the same time; and his lifting of the facade of this picturesque, Norman Rockwell setting is carried out with surgical precision". He further mentioned that "like Kubrick, Field doesn't make any moral judgments about his characters, and his film remains stubbornly enigmatic. It can be read as a high-class revenge thriller, an ode to the futility of vengeance or almost anything in between."

Among the negative reviews of the film include Paul Tatara of CNN mentioning that the film "flounders" despite the good performances. Stephen Hunter of The Washington Post said "it opens brilliantly" but goes on to "self-negating absurdity."

=== Retrospective lists ===
A. O. Scott included the film in his New York Times essay "The most important films of the past decade—and why they mattered."

In the Bedroom was also chosen by the New York Times Film Critics for their "Best 1,000 Films of All Time" list.

The March 2023 issue of New York magazine listed In the Bedroom alongside Citizen Kane, Sunset Boulevard, Dr. Strangelove, Butch Cassidy and the Sundance Kid, The Conversation, Nashville, Taxi Driver, The Elephant Man, Pulp Fiction, There Will Be Blood, Roma, and Tár, also directed by Field, as "The Best Movies That Lost Best Picture at the Oscars".

The March 2024 issue of IndieWire listed In the Bedroom and Tár, also directed by Field, as two of the "Best Picture Nominees that Deserved to win the Oscar."

== Accolades ==
Award	Category	Recipients	Result
Academy Awards	Best Picture	Graham Leader, Ross Katz and Todd Field	Nominated
Academy Awards	Best Actor	Tom Wilkinson	Nominated
Academy Awards	Best Actress	Sissy Spacek	Nominated
Academy Awards	Best Supporting Actress	Marisa Tomei	Nominated
Academy Awards	Best Adapted Screenplay	Robert Festinger and Todd Field	Nominated
American Film Institute Awards	Top 10 Films	Graham Leader, Ross Katz, Todd Field	Won
American Film Institute Awards	Actor of the Year	Tom Wilkinson	Nominated
American Film Institute Awards	Actress of the Year	Sissy Spacek	Won
BAFTA Awards	Best Actor in a Leading Role	Tom Wilkinson	Nominated
BAFTA Awards	Best Actress in a Leading Role	Sissy Spacek	Nominated
Broadcast Film Critics Association Awards	Best Film	Graham Leader, Ross Katz, Todd Field	Nominated
Broadcast Film Critics Association Awards	Best Actress	Sissy Spacek	Won
Broadcast Film Critics Association Awards	Best Supporting Actress	Marisa Tomei	Nominated
Chicago Film Critics Association Awards	Best Film	Graham Leader, Ross Katz, Todd Field	Nominated
Chicago Film Critics Association Awards	Best Actor	Tom Wilkinson	Nominated
Chicago Film Critics Association Awards	Best Actress	Sissy Spacek	Nominated
Chicago Film Critics Association Awards	Best Supporting Actress	Marisa Tomei	Nominated
Dallas–Fort Worth Film Critics Association Awards	Best Actress	Sissy Spacek	Won
Dallas–Fort Worth Film Critics Association Awards	Best Supporting Actress	Marisa Tomei	Won
Florida Film Critics Circle Awards	Best Actress	Sissy Spacek	Won
Golden Globe Awards	Best Motion Picture – Drama	Graham Leader, Ross Katz, Todd Field	Nominated
Golden Globe Awards	Best Actress – Motion Picture, Drama	Sissy Spacek	Won
Golden Globe Awards	Best Supporting Actress – Motion Picture	Marisa Tomei	Nominated
Independent Spirit Awards	Best First Feature	Todd Field	Won
Independent Spirit Awards	Best Male Lead	Tom Wilkinson	Won
Independent Spirit Awards	Best Female Lead	Sissy Spacek	Won
Independent Spirit Awards	Best Screenplay	Robert Festinger and Todd Field	Nominated
Los Angeles Film Critics Association Awards	Best Film	Graham Leader, Ross Katz, Todd Field	Won
Los Angeles Film Critics Association Awards	Best Actress	Sissy Spacek	Won
National Board of Review Awards	Best Director	Todd Field	Won
National Board of Review Awards	Best Screenplay	Robert Festinger and Todd Field	Won
New York Film Critics Circle Awards	Best First Film	Todd Field	Won
New York Film Critics Circle Awards	Best Actor	Tom Wilkinson	Won
New York Film Critics Circle Awards	Best Actress	Sissy Spacek	Won
Online Film Critics Society Awards	Best Film	Graham Leader, Ross Katz, Todd Field	Nominated
Online Film Critics Society Awards	Best Director	Todd Field	Nominated
Online Film Critics Society Awards	Best Actor	Tom Wilkinson	Nominated
Online Film Critics Society Awards	Best Actress	Sissy Spacek	Nominated
Online Film Critics Society Awards	Best Supporting Actress	Marisa Tomei	Nominated
Online Film Critics Society Awards	Best Screenplay – Adapted	Robert Festinger and Todd Field	Nominated
Online Film Critics Society Awards	Best Breakthrough Filmmaker	Todd Field	Nominated
Satellite Awards	Best Film – Drama	Graham Leader, Ross Katz, Todd Field	Won
Satellite Awards	Best Actress – Drama	Sissy Spacek	Won
Satellite Awards	Best Supporting Actress – Drama	Marisa Tomei	Nominated
Satellite Awards	Best Screenplay – Adapted	Robert Festinger and Todd Field	Won
Screen Actors Guild Awards	Outstanding Performance by a Male Actor in a Leading Role	Tom Wilkinson	Nominated
Screen Actors Guild Awards	Outstanding Performance by a Female Actor in a Leading Role	Sissy Spacek	Nominated
Screen Actors Guild Awards	Outstanding Performance by a Cast in a Motion Picture	William Mapother, Sissy Spacek, Nick Stahl, Marisa Tomei, Celia Weston, Tom Wilkinson, William Wise	Nominated
Southeastern Film Critics Association Awards	Best Actress	Sissy Spacek	Won
Southeastern Film Critics Association Awards	Best Supporting Actress	Marisa Tomei	Won
Sundance Film Festival Awards	Special Jury Prize – Dramatic Acting	Sissy Spacek and Tom Wilkinson	Won
USC Scripter Award	USC Scripter Award	Robert Festinger and Todd Field (screenwriters) and Andre Dubus (author)	Nominated
Vancouver Film Critics Circle	Best Actor	Tom Wilkinson	Nominated
Vancouver Film Critics Circle	Best Actress	Sissy Spacek	Won

== Home media ==
The film was released on DVD in 2002 in a bare-bones edition containing no extras or director's commentary. When Field was asked by The New York Times why this was the case, he said, "Once a film is made available to the public, the right of interpretation belongs to the viewer. Unless it's something historical—like Citizen Kane or Raging Bull—it seems really silly to have that kind of thing."

== Film archives ==
A 35mm safety print is housed in the permanent collection of the UCLA Film & Television Archive.

== Popular culture ==
During season four (episode eight, "Mergers and Acquisitions") of The Sopranos, Tony shows Carmela the new media center he has installed in the pool house, and she replies that she will pick up In the Bedroom for them to watch.
