= Online Film Critics Society Award for Best Adapted Screenplay =

Annual film award

The Online Film Critics Society Award for Best Adapted Screenplay is an annual film award given by the Online Film Critics Society to honor the best screenplay (adapted from another medium) of the year.

== Winners and nominees ==
Winners are in bold.

=== 1990s ===
| Year | Winner | Writer(s) | Source |
|---|---|---|---|
| 1998 | **Out of Sight** | **Scott Frank** | **Out of Sight by Elmore Leonard** |
| 1998 | Primary Colors | Elaine May | Primary Colors by Joe Klein |
| 1998 | A Simple Plan | Scott Smith | A Simple Plan by Scott B. Smith |
| 1999 | **Election** | **Alexander Payne and Jim Taylor** | **Election by Tom Perrotta** |
| 1999 | Fight Club | Jim Uhls | Fight Club by Chuck Palahniuk |
| 1999 | The Green Mile | Frank Darabont | The Green Mile by Stephen King |
| 1999 | The Insider | Eric Roth and Michael Mann | "The Man Who Knew Too Much" by Marie Brenner |
| 1999 | The Talented Mr. Ripley | Anthony Minghella | The Talented Mr. Ripley by Patricia Highsmith |

=== 2000s ===
| Year | Winner | Writer(s) | Source |
|---|---|---|---|
| 2000 | No Best Adapted Screenplay Award this year. | | |
| 2001 | **Memento** | **Christopher Nolan** | **"Memento Mori" by Jonathan Nolan** |
| 2001 | A.I. Artificial Intelligence | Steven Spielberg | "Supertoys Last All Summer Long" by Brian Aldiss |
| 2001 | Ghost World | Daniel Clowes and Terry Zwigoff | Ghost World by Daniel Clowes |
| 2001 | In the Bedroom | Todd Field and Rob Festinger | "Killings" by Andre Dubus |
| 2001 | The Lord of the Rings: The Fellowship of the Ring | Fran Walsh, Philippa Boyens, and Peter Jackson | The Fellowship of the Ring by J. R. R. Tolkien |
| 2002 | **Adaptation.** | **Charlie Kaufman and Donald Kaufman** | **The Orchid Thief by Susan Orlean** |
| 2002 | About Schmidt | Alexander Payne and Jim Taylor | About Schmidt by Louis Begley |
| 2002 | Catch Me If You Can | Jeff Nathanson | Catch Me If You Can by Frank Abagnale Jr. & Stan Redding |
| 2002 | The Lord of the Rings: The Two Towers | Fran Walsh, Philippa Boyens, Stephen Sinclair, and Peter Jackson | The Two Towers by J. R. R. Tolkien |
| 2002 | Minority Report | Scott Frank and Jon Cohen | "The Minority Report" by Philip K. Dick |
| 2003 | **The Lord of the Rings: The Return of the King** | **Philippa Boyens, Peter Jackson, and Fran Walsh** | **The Return of the King by J. R. R. Tolkien** |
| 2003 | American Splendor | Shari Springer Berman and Robert Pulcini | American Splendor by Harvey Pekar and Our Cancer Year by Harvey Pekar &Joyce Brabner |
| 2003 | Bubba Ho-Tep | Don Coscarelli | Bubba Ho-Tep by Joe R. Lansdale |
| 2003 | Mystic River | Brian Helgeland | Mystic River by Dennis Lehane |
| 2003 | Shattered Glass | Billy Ray | "Shattered Glass" by H. G. Bissinger |
| 2004 | **Sideways** | **Alexander Payne and Jim Taylor** | **Sideways by Rex Pickett** |
| 2004 | Before Sunset | Richard Linklater, Julie Delpy, and Ethan Hawke | Characters by Richard Linklater and Kim Krizan |
| 2004 | Closer | Patrick Marber | Closer by Patrick Marber |
| 2004 | Million Dollar Baby | Paul Haggis | Rope Burns: Stories from the Corner by F.X. Toole |
| 2004 | The Motorcycle Diaries | José Rivera | The Motorcycle Diaries by Che Guevara & Che Guevara: The Making of a Revolutionary by Alberto Granado |
| 2005 | **Brokeback Mountain** | **Larry McMurty & Diana Ossana** | **Brokeback Mountain by Annie Proulx** |
| 2005 | Capote | Dan Futterman | Capote by Gerald Clarke |
| 2005 | The Constant Gardener | Jeffrey Caine | The Constant Gardener by John le Carré |
| 2005 | A History of Violence | Josh Olson | A History of Violence by John Wagner & Vince Locke |
| 2005 | Munich | Tony Kushner & Eric Roth | Vengeance by George Jonas |
| 2006 | **Children of Men** | **Alfonso Cuarón, Timothy J. Sexton, David Arata, Mark Fergus, & Hawk Ostby** | **The Children of Men by P. D. James** |
| 2006 | The Departed | William Monahan | Infernal Affairs by Alan Mak & Felix Chong |
| 2006 | Little Children | Todd Field & Tom Perrotta | Little Children by Tom Perrotta |
| 2006 | The Prestige | Jonathan Nolan & Christopher Nolan | The Prestige by Christopher Priest |
| 2006 | Thank You for Smoking | Jason Reitman | Thank You for Smoking by Christopher Buckley |
| 2007 | **No Country for Old Men** | **Joel and Ethan Coen** | **No Country for Old Men by Cormac McCarthy** |
| 2007 | Atonement | Christopher Hampton | Atonement by Ian McEwan |
| 2007 | The Diving Bell and the Butterfly | Ronald Harwood | The Diving Bell and the Butterfly by Jean-Dominique Bauby |
| 2007 | There Will Be Blood | Paul Thomas Anderson | Oil! by Upton Sinclair |
| 2007 | Zodiac | James Vanderbilt | Zodiac and Zodiac Unmasked by Robert Graysmith |
| 2008 | **Let the Right One In** | **John Ajvide Lindqvist** | **Låt den rätte komma in by John Ajvide Lindqvist** |
| 2008 | The Curious Case of Benjamin Button | Eric Roth | The Curious Case of Benjamin Button by F. Scott Fitzgerald |
| 2008 | The Dark Knight | Jonathan Nolan & Christopher Nolan | Comic books published by DC Comics |
| 2008 | Frost/Nixon | Peter Morgan | Frost/Nixon by Peter Morgan |
| 2008 | Slumdog Millionaire | Simon Beaufoy | Q & A by Vikas Swarup |
| 2009 | **Fantastic Mr. Fox** | **Wes Anderson and Noah Baumbach** | **Fantastic Mr Fox by Roald Dahl** |
| 2009 | District 9 | Neill Blomkamp & Terri Tatchell | Alive in Joburg by Neill Blomkamp |
| 2009 | In the Loop | Jesse Armstrong, Simon Blackwell, Armando Iannucci, & Tony Roche | The Thick of It by Armando Iannucci |
| 2009 | Up in the Air | Jason Reitman & Sheldon Turner | Up in the Air by Walter Kirn |
| 2009 | Where the Wild Things Are | Spike Jonze & Dave Eggers | Where the Wild Things Are by Maurice Sendak |

=== 2010s ===
| Year | Winner | Writer(s) | Source |
|---|---|---|---|
| 2010 | **The Social Network** | **Aaron Sorkin** | **The Accidental Billionaires by Ben Mezrich** |
| 2010 | 127 Hours | Danny Boyle & Simon Beaufoy | Between a Rock and a Hard Place by Aron Ralston |
| 2010 | Scott Pilgrim vs. the World | Michael Bacall & Edgar Wright | Scott Pilgrim by Bryan Lee O'Malley |
| 2010 | True Grit | Joel Coen & Ethan Coen | True Grit by Charles Portis |
| 2010 | Winter’s Bone | Debra Granik & Anne Rosellini | Winter's Bone by Daniel Woodrell |
| 2011 | **Tinker Tailor Soldier Spy** | **Bridget O'Connor and Peter Straughan** | **Tinker Tailor Soldier Spy by John le Carré** |
| 2011 | The Descendants | Nat Faxon, Jim Rash, & Alexander Payne | The Descendants by Kaui Hart Hemmings |
| 2011 | Drive | Hossein Amini | Drive by James Sallis |
| 2011 | Moneyball | Steven Zaillian & Aaron Sorkin | Moneyball: The Art of Winning an Unfair Game by Michael Lewis |
| 2011 | We Need to Talk About Kevin | Lynne Ramsay & Rory Stewart Kinnear | We Need to Talk About Kevin by Lionel Shriver |
| 2012 | **Argo** | **Chris Terrio** | **The Master of Disguise by Antonio J. Mendez and "The Great Escape: How the CIA Used a Fake Sci-Fi Flick to Rescue Americans from Tehran" by Joshuah Bearman** |
| 2012 | Beasts of the Southern Wild | Lucy Alibar & Benh Zeitlin | Juicy and Delicious by Lucy Alibar |
| 2012 | Cloud Atlas | Lana Wachowski, Tom Tykwer, & Lilly Wachowski | Cloud Atlas by David Mitchell |
| 2012 | Cosmopolis | David Cronenberg | Cosmopolis by Don DeLillo |
| 2012 | Lincoln | Tony Kushner | Team of Rivals by Doris Kearns Goodwin |
| 2013 | **12 Years a Slave** | **John Ridley** | **Twelve Years a Slave by Solomon Northup** |
| 2013 | Before Midnight | Richard Linklater, Julie Delpy, & Ethan Hawke | Characters by Richard Linklater and Kim Krizan |
| 2013 | In the House | Juan Mayorga & François Ozon | The Boy in the Last Row by Juan Mayorga |
| 2013 | Short Term 12 | Destin Cretton | Short Term 12 (short) by Destin Daniel Cretton |
| 2013 | The Wind Rises | Hayao Miyazaki | 風立ちぬ (The Wind Has Risen) by Hayao Miyazaki |
| 2014 | **Gone Girl** | **Gillian Flynn** | **Gone Girl by Gillian Flynn** |
| 2014 | Inherent Vice | Paul Thomas Anderson | Inherent Vice by Thomas Pynchon |
| 2014 | Snowpiercer | Bong Joon-ho & Kelly Masterson | Le Transperceneige by Jacques Lob, Benjamin Legrand, &Jean-Marc Rochette |
| 2014 | Under the Skin | Walter Campbell & Jonathan Glazer | Under the Skin by Michel Faber |
| 2014 | We Are the Best! | Lukas Moodysson | Never Goodnight by Coco Moodysson |
| 2015 | **Carol** | **Phyllis Nagy** | **The Price of Salt by Patricia Highsmith** |
| 2015 | Brooklyn | Nick Hornby | Brooklyn by Colm Tóibín |
| 2015 | The Martian | Drew Goddard | The Martian by Andy Weir |
| 2015 | Room | Emma Donoghue | Room by Emma Donoghue |
| 2015 | Steve Jobs | Aaron Sorkin | Steve Jobs by Walter Isaacson |
| 2016 | **Arrival** | **Eric Heisserer** | **"Story of Your Life" by Ted Chiang** |
| 2016 | Elle | David Birke & Philippe Djian | Oh... by Philippe Djian |
| 2016 | Love & Friendship | Whit Stillman | Lady Susan by Jane Austen |
| 2016 | Moonlight | Barry Jenkins & Tarell Alvin McCraney | In Moonlight Black Boys Look Blue by |
| 2016 | Nocturnal Animals | Tom Ford | Tony and Susan by Austin Wright |
| 2017 | **Call Me by Your Name** | **James Ivory** | **Call Me by Your Name by André Aciman** |
| 2017 | The Beguiled | Sofia Coppola | The Beguiled by Thomas P. Cullinan & The Beguiled by Albert Maltz |
| 2017 | The Disaster Artist | Scott Neustadter & Michael H. Weber | The Disaster Artist: My Life Inside The Room, the Greatest Bad Movie Ever Made by Greg Sestero & Tom Bissell |
| 2017 | The Lost City of Z | James Gray | The Lost City of Z by David Grann |
| 2017 | Molly's Game | Aaron Sorkin | Molly's Game by Molly Bloom |
| 2018 | **If Beale Street Could Talk** | **Barry Jenkins** | **If Beale Street Could Talk by James Baldwin** |
| 2018 | BlacKkKlansman | Charlie Wachtel, David Rabinowitz, Kevin Willmott, & Spike Lee | Black Klansman by Ron Stallworth |
| 2018 | Can You Ever Forgive Me? | Nicole Holofcener & Jeff Whitty | Can You Ever Forgive Me? by Lee Israel |
| 2018 | Leave No Trace | Debra Granik & Anne Rosellini | My Abandonment by Peter Rock |
| 2018 | Widows | Gillian Flynn & Steve McQueen | Widows by Lynda La Plante |
| 2019 | **The Irishman** | **Steven Zaillian** | **I Heard You Paint Houses by Charles Brandt** |
| 2019 | A Beautiful Day in the Neighborhood | Micah Fitzerman-Blue & Noah Harpster | "Can You Say ... Hero?" by Tom Junod |
| 2019 | Hustlers | Lorene Scafaria | "The Hustlers at Scores" by Jessica Pressler |
| 2019 | Jojo Rabbit | Taika Waititi | Caging Skies by Christine Leunens |
| 2019 | Little Women | Greta Gerwig | Little Women by Louisa May Alcott |

=== 2020s ===
| Year | Winner | Writer(s) | Source |
|---|---|---|---|
| 2020 | **Nomadland** | **Chloé Zhao** | **Nomadland: Surviving America in the Twenty-First Century by Jessica Bruder** |
| 2020 | First Cow | Jonathan Raymond & Kelly Reichardt | The Half-Life by Jonathan Raymond |
| 2020 | I'm Thinking of Ending Things | Charlie Kaufman | I'm Thinking of Ending Things by Iain Reid |
| 2020 | Ma Rainey's Black Bottom | Ruben Santiago-Hudson | Ma Rainey's Black Bottom by August Wilson |
| 2020 | One Night in Miami | Kemp Powers | One Night in Miami by Kemp Powers |
| 2021 | **The Power of the Dog** | **Jane Campion** | **novel by Thomas Savage** |
| 2021 | Drive My Car | Ryusuke Hamaguchi & Takamasa Oe | "Drive My Car" by Haruki Murakami |
| 2021 | Dune | Jon Spaihts, Denis Villeneuve, & Eric Roth | Dune by Frank Herbert |
| 2021 | The Lost Daughter | Maggie Gyllenhaal | The Lost Daughter by Elena Ferrante |
| 2021 | Passing | Rebecca Hall | Passing by Nella Larsen |
| 2022 | **Glass Onion: A Knives Out Mystery** | **Rian Johnson** | **characters from the film Knives Out by Rian Johnson** |
| 2022 | Guillermo del Toro's Pinocchio | Guillermo del Toro & Patrick McHale | Pinocchio by Carlo Collodi |
| 2022 | She Said | Rebecca Lenkiewicz | She Said by Jodi Kantor & Megan Twohey |
| 2022 | White Noise | Noah Baumbach | White Noise by Don DeLillo |
| 2022 | Women Talking | Sarah Polley | Women Talking by Miriam Toews |
| 2023 | **Oppenheimer** | **Christopher Nolan** | **American Prometheus by Kai Bird & Martin J. Sherwin** |
| 2023 | American Fiction | Cord Jefferson | Erasure by Percival Everett |
| 2023 | Killers of the Flower Moon | Eric Roth & Martin Scorsese | Killers of the Flower Moon by David Grann |
| 2023 | Poor Things | Tony McNamara | Poor Things by Alasdair Gray |
| 2023 | The Zone of Interest | Jonathan Glazer | The Zone of Interest by Martin Amis |
| 2024 | **Conclave** | **Peter Straughan** | **Conclave by Robert Harris** |
| 2024 | Dune: Part Two | Denis Villeneuve & Jon Spaihts | Dune by Frank Herbert |
| 2024 | Nickel Boys | RaMell Ross & Joslyn Barnes | The Nickel Boys by Colson Whitehead |
| 2024 | Nosferatu | Robert Eggers | Nosferatu: A Symphony of Horror by Henrik Galeen & Dracula by Bram Stoker |
| 2024 | Sing Sing | Clint Bentley & Greg Kwedar | "The Sing Sing Follies" by John H. Richardson & Breakin' the Mummy's Code by Brent Buell |
