= Charlie Hunnam =

British actor (born 1980)

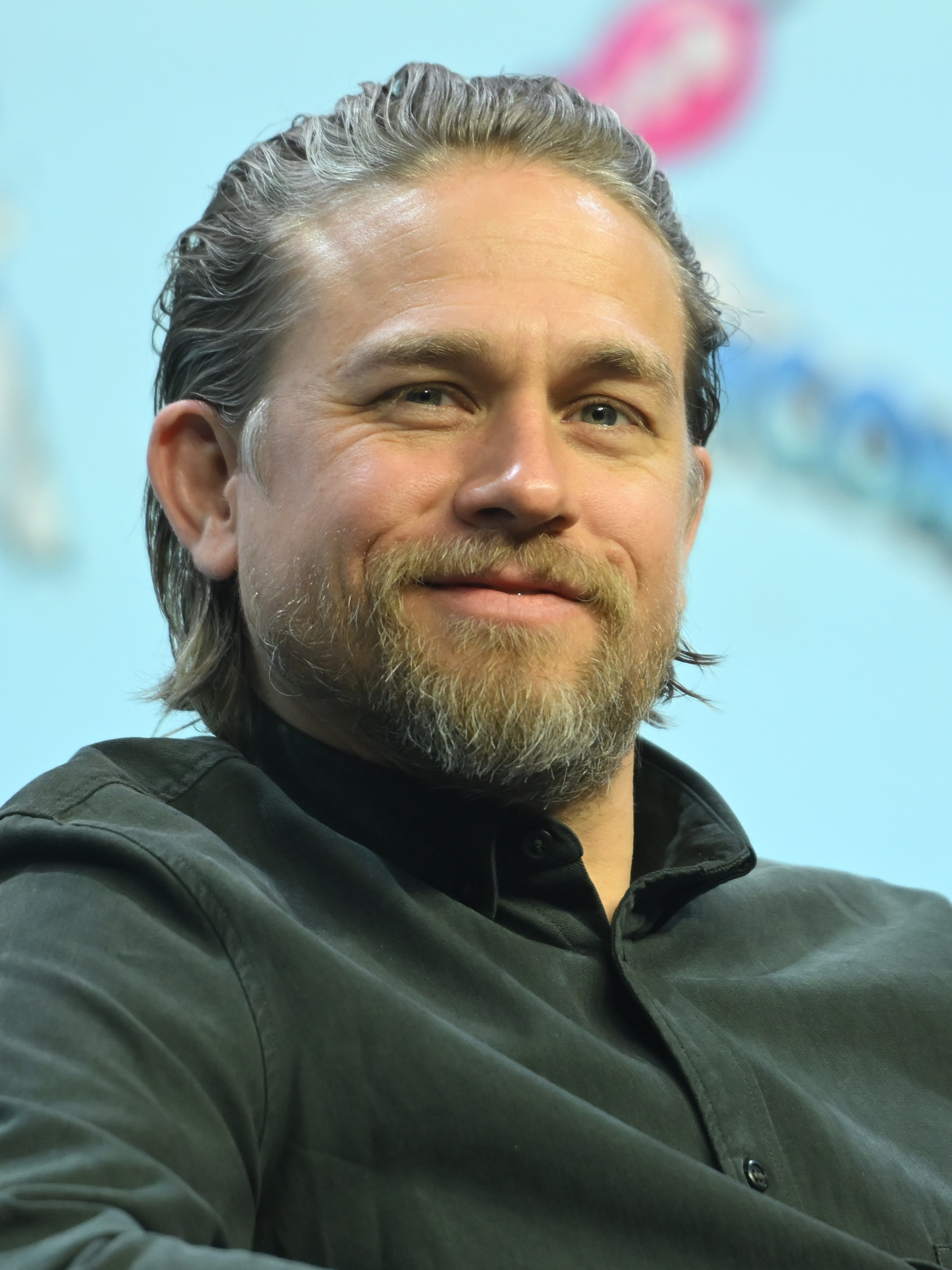
- Hunnam in 2024
- Born: Charles Matthew Hunnam; 10 April 1980 (age 46); Newcastle upon Tyne, England
- Education: Cumbria College of Art and Design
- Occupation: Actor
- Years active: 1998–present
- Spouse: Katharine Towne (m. 1999; div. 2002)

Charles Matthew Hunnam (/ˈhʌnəm/; born 10 April 1980) is an English actor. He portrayed Jax Teller in the FX drama series Sons of Anarchy (2008–2014), for which he was twice nominated for the Critics' Choice Television Award for Best Actor.

Hunnam has been featured as the lead in numerous films, including Green Street (2005), Nicholas Nickleby (2002), Pacific Rim (2013), Triple Frontier (2019). He has also portrayed Percy Fawcett in The Lost City of Z (2016) and Arthur Pendragon in King Arthur: Legend of the Sword (2017).

Hunnam's notable television projects include the Channel 4 drama Queer as Folk (1999–2000), the Fox series Undeclared (2001–2002) and the Apple TV+ series Shantaram (2022). In 2025, he portrayed the titular character in Monster: The Ed Gein Story, and in 2026, he portrayed Andrew Borden in Monster: The Lizzie Borden Story, the third and fourth season of the Netflix true crime anthology series Monster, for which he received nominations for a Primetime Emmy Awards, a Golden Globe Award, an Actor Award, and a Critics' Choice Television Award.

== Early life ==
Charles Matthew Hunnam was born in Newcastle upon Tyne on 10 April 1980, the son of Jane Bell, a ballet dancer and business owner, and William Hunnam. One of his grandmothers was a portrait artist. He has said that his mother "did a very good job" of being a single parent. He has an older brother named William and two younger half brothers on his mother's side named Oliver and Christian.

At age 12, when his mother remarried, the family moved to Melmerby in Cumbria. He attended Queen Elizabeth Grammar School, Penrith, from which he was later expelled. During his adolescence, he played rugby and fought with his classmates. After that, instead of going to university, he decided to go to the Cumbria College of Art and Design in Carlisle (now part of the University of Cumbria) to study performing arts. He studied a Diploma in Media, changing to Performing Arts at the same time as studting an A-Level in Film Studies. He did not complete either course as he left to star in Queer as Folk.

== Career ==
=== 1997–2007 ===
Hunnam was discovered at the age of 17 in a branch of JD Sports on Christmas Eve, while playing around with his brother during a trip to buy shoes. A production manager for the Newcastle-based teen drama Byker Grove approached Hunnam and he was later cast in his first role as Jason for three episodes of the show. He also had a brief modelling career where he did a photo shoot for Kangol Caps and then decided modelling was not for him. Hunnam's first major role came at age 18 when he was cast by Russell T Davies as 15-year-old schoolboy Nathan Maloney in Davies' Channel 4 drama Queer as Folk. He followed this up with his role as Daz in the film Whatever Happened to Harold Smith? (1999) and then moved to the United States. Hunnam was heavily considered by George Lucas for the role of Anakin Skywalker in Star Wars: Attack of the Clones, but following an awkward in-person interview with George Lucas and producers, ultimately Hayden Christensen was cast in the role instead.

His career expanded to include a recurring role as Gregor Ryder in the WB series Young Americans. He then appeared in the short-lived Fox series Undeclared as a British drama student called Lloyd Haythe. Despite critical acclaim, the series was cancelled after one season. Hunnam then appeared on the large screen in Abandon (2002), Nicholas Nickleby (2002), and Cold Mountain (2003). Hunnam stated he did not wish to simply take any role offered to him, saying, "I have 60 years to make the money, but the choices I make in the next five years are really going to define my career."

This decision resulted in his return to the UK to take the lead role of Pete Dunham in the film Green Street (2005); however, his attempt at delivering a Cockney accent resulted in his inclusion in many critics' "worst accents in movie history" lists. Hunnam said his role as Patric, a member of "The Fishes" in Children of Men (2006), was the final part in his "trilogy of mad men": "I played the psycho in Cold Mountain, my character in Green Street Hooligans is fairly psychotic and now I've got this role."

=== 2008–2012 ===
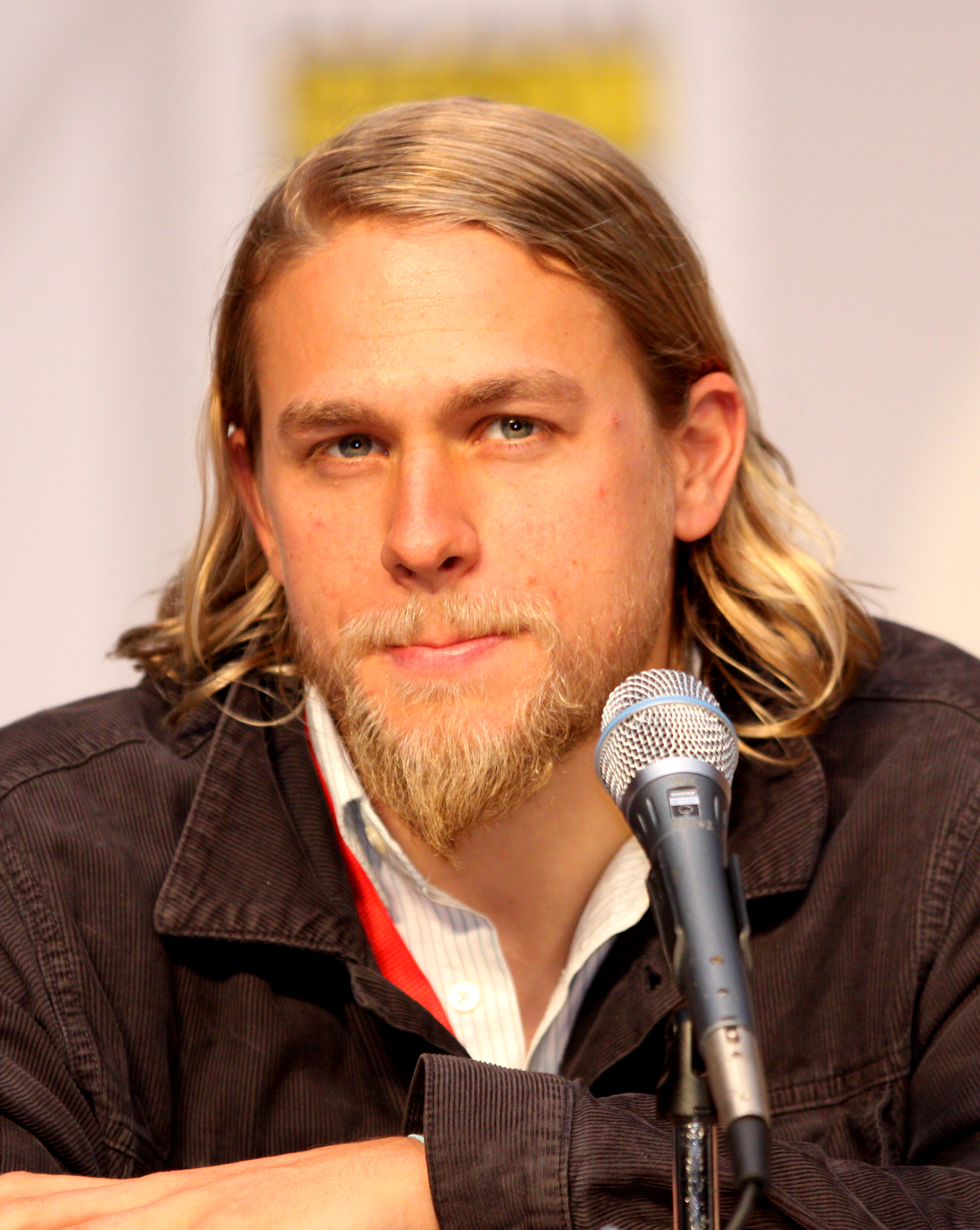
Hunnam at San Diego Comic-Con in July 2010

From 2008 to 2014, Hunnam starred in Sons of Anarchy as Jackson "Jax" Teller leader of SAMCRO, a prominent motorcycle club set in the fictional town of Charming, California. Hunnam was cast after Kurt Sutter, the creator of the show, saw him in Green Street Hooligans. His portrayal as Jax Teller has led Hunnam to receive a Critics' Choice Television Award nomination, two EWwy Award nominations for Best Lead Actor in a Drama series, and a PAAFTJ Award nomination for Best Cast in a Drama Series.

In 2011, Hunnam played the role of Gavin Nichols in the philosophical drama/thriller The Ledge by Matthew Chapman. In 2012, he starred as the title character in the indie comedy 3,2,1... Frankie Go Boom alongside his Sons of Anarchy co-star Ron Perlman. Hunnam said he considered the day he filmed scenes with Perlman the best and funniest day of filming he's had in his career. He also appeared as Jay, an ex-boxer, in Stefan Ruzowitzky's crime drama Deadfall (2012).

=== 2013–2019 ===
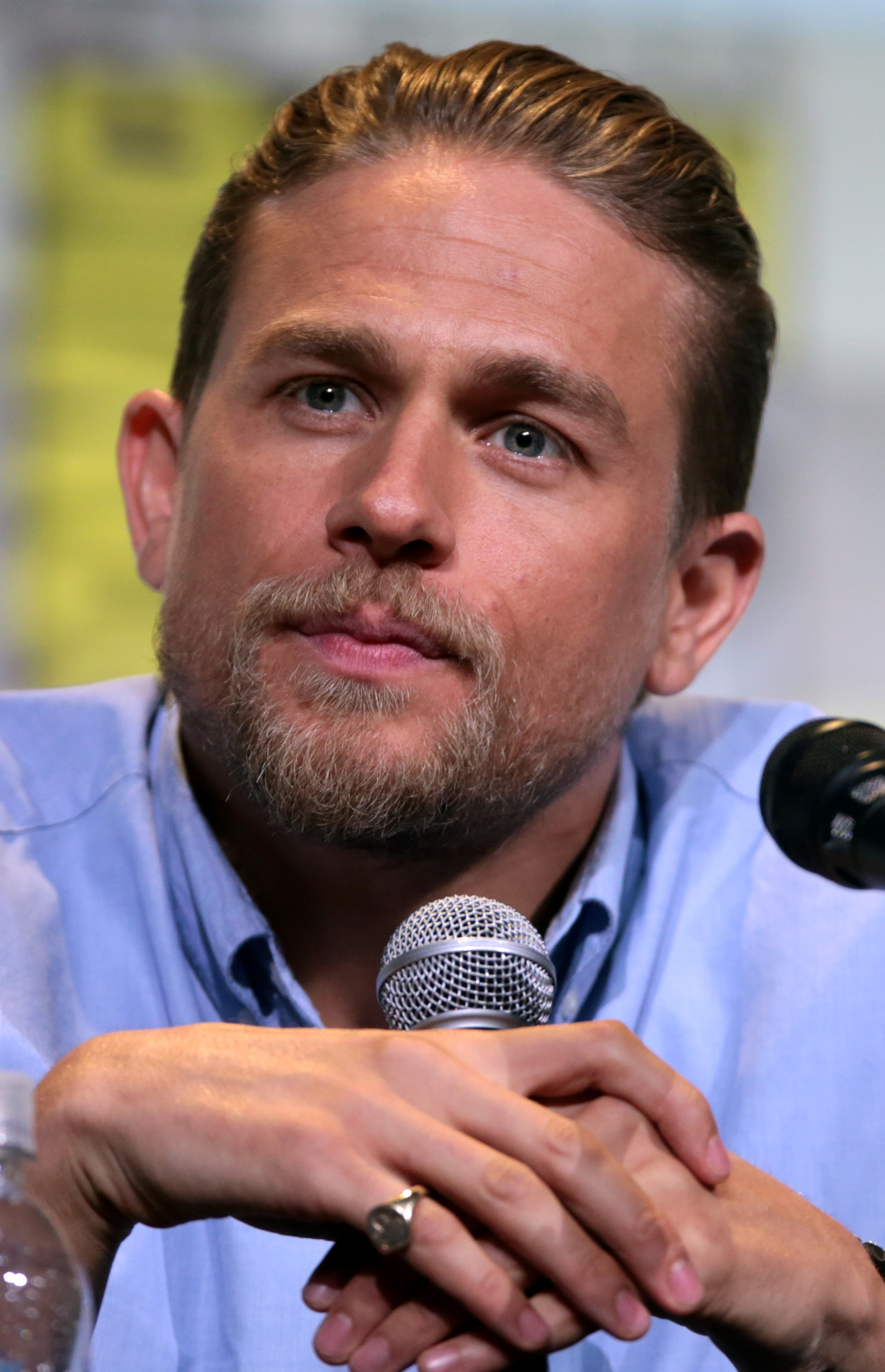
Hunnam at San Diego Comic-Con in 2016

Hunnam starred as Raleigh Becket in Guillermo del Toro's sci-fi film Pacific Rim, which opened in July 2013 and grossed $411 million worldwide. It was announced on 2 September 2013 that Hunnam would play the lead role of Christian Grey in the film adaptation of E. L. James' novel Fifty Shades of Grey. However, on 12 October 2013, Universal Pictures announced that Hunnam had withdrawn from the film due to conflicts with the schedule of his series Sons of Anarchy.

On 2 June 2014, Hunnam was awarded a Huading Award for Best Global Emerging Actor, for his role as Raleigh in Pacific Rim due to the film performing well in Asian markets. Hunnam reunited with del Toro in the horror film Crimson Peak, alongside Mia Wasikowska, Tom Hiddleston, and Jessica Chastain. The film began shooting in February 2014 and was released on 16 October 2015.

Hunnam starred as geographer Percy Fawcett in James Gray's adaptation of author David Grann's 2009 book, The Lost City of Z: A Tale of Deadly Obsession in the Amazon. Gray dubbed his adventure drama The Lost City of Z, which was filmed from August to October 2015. The film had its world premiere 15 October 2016 as the closing night selection at the New York Film Festival. It was released in the United States on 14 April 2017. Hunnam played the eponymous title role in Guy Ritchie's action-adventure film King Arthur: Legend of the Sword, which was filmed between March and July 2015. It was released in May 2017. He next starred in Guy Ritchie's 2019 film The Gentlemen alongside Matthew McConaughey.

=== 2020–present ===
Hunnam portrayed Charlie Waldo in the 2022 mystery/thriller Last Looks which also featured Mel Gibson. His first television series for Apple TV+, Shantaram, premiered 14 October 2022. Hunnam led the cast of characters as Dale Conti/Lindsay "Linbaba" Ford. The series was based on Gregory David Roberts' 2003 autobiographical novel.

On 9 February 2023, Deadline Hollywood reported that Hunnam joined Zack Snyder's Netflix project Rebel Moon. The project reunited Hunnam with King Arthur: Legend of the Sword co-star Djimon Hounsou. The epic space opera, Rebel Moon – Part One: A Child of Fire had a limited theatrical release on 15 December 2023. On 21 December 2023, the film was released worldwide via Netflix's streaming service. Rebel Moon – Part Two: The Scargiver was released worldwide 14 April 2024 on Netflix.

In May 2024, Hunnam was cast in the lead role of Leo, "a brilliant master thief", for Amazon Prime Video's adaptation of the comic series by Ed Brubaker and Sean Phillips, Criminal.

In October 2025, Hunnam portrayed convicted murderer and grave robber Ed Gein in Monster: The Ed Gein Story, the third season of the biographical crime drama anthology series Monster, created by Ryan Murphy and Ian Brennan for Netflix. Hunnam also served as an executive producer for the season. Hunnam reappeared in the fourth season of the same series, this time playing Andrew Borden, father of Lizzie Borden, who was accused of killing her parents in Fall River, Massachusetts.

== Personal life ==
Hunnam met actress Katharine Towne, daughter of actress Julie Payne and filmmaker Robert Towne, in 1999 when they both auditioned for roles on Dawson's Creek. After dating for three weeks, they married in Las Vegas; they divorced in 2002. He dated model Sophie Dahl, actress Stella Parker and film producer Georgina Townsley. He has been in a relationship with artist Morgana McNelis since 2005. He referred to McNelis as his wife in an interview in January 2026 at the Critic’s Choice Awards.

In 2016, he began training in Brazilian jiu-jitsu under Rigan Machado, and received his blue belt in October 2018.

== Filmography ==
=== Film ===
Year	Title	Roles	Notes	Ref.
1999	Whatever Happened to Harold Smith?	Daz		
2002	Abandon	Embry Larkin		
2002	Nicholas Nickleby	Nicholas Nickleby		
2003	Cold Mountain	Bosie		
2005	Green Street	Peter "Pete" Dunham		
2006	Children of Men	Patric		
2011	The Ledge	Gavin Nichols		
2012	3, 2, 1... Frankie Go Boom	Frankie		
2012	Deadfall	Jay Mills		
2013	Pacific Rim	Raleigh Becket		
2015	Crimson Peak	Dr. Alan McMichael		
2016	The Lost City of Z	Percy Fawcett		
2017	King Arthur: Legend of the Sword	King Arthur		
2017	Papillon	Henri "Papillon" Charrière		
2019	A Million Little Pieces	Bob Frey Jr.		
2019	Triple Frontier	William "Ironhead" Miller		
2019	True History of the Kelly Gang	Sergeant O'Neill		
2019	Jungleland	Stanley Kaminski		
2019	The Gentlemen	Raymond Smith		
2022	Last Looks	Charlie Waldo		
2023	Rebel Moon – Part One: A Child of Fire	Kai		

=== Television ===
Year	Title	Role	Notes	Ref.
1998	Byker Grove	Jason Chuckle	Episode: "#10.1"	
1999	My Wonderful Life	Wes	Main role; 7 episodes (series 3)	
1999–2000	Queer as Folk	Nathan Maloney	Main role; 10 episodes	
1999	Microsoap	Brad	Episode: "#2.6"	
2000	Young Americans	Gregor Ryder	Recurring role; 3 episodes	
2001–2002	Undeclared	Lloyd Haythe	Main role; 17 episodes	
2008–2014	Sons of Anarchy	Jackson "Jax" Teller	Main role; 92 episodes	
2022	Shantaram	Lin Ford	Main role; 12 episodes	
2025	Monster: The Ed Gein Story	Ed Gein	Main role; 8 episodes (also executive producer)	
2026	Monster: The Lizzie Borden Story	Andrew Borden	Main role; 7 episodes	
2027	Criminal	Leo	Main role	

== Awards and nominations ==
Year	Award	Category	Work	Result	Ref.
2002	National Board of Review	Best Acting by an Ensemble	Nicholas Nickleby	Won	
2012	EWwy Award	EWwy Award for Best Actor in a Drama Series	Sons of Anarchy	Nominated	
2012	Critics' Choice Television Award	Best Actor in a Drama Series	Sons of Anarchy	Nominated	
2013	Pan-American Association of Film & Television Journalists	Best Cast in a Drama Series	Sons of Anarchy	Nominated	
2014	EWwy Award	EWwy Award for Best Actor in a Drama Series	Sons of Anarchy	Nominated	
2015	People's Choice Awards	Favorite Cable TV Actor	Sons of Anarchy	Nominated	
2015	Satellite Awards	Best Actor in a Drama Series	Sons of Anarchy	Nominated	
2015	Critics' Choice Television Awards	Best Actor in a Drama Series	Sons of Anarchy	Nominated	
2013	Huading Awards	Huading Award for Best Global Emerging Actor	Pacific Rim	Won	
2017	CinemaCon Award	Male Star of the Year	King Arthur: Legend of the Sword	Won	
2026	Golden Globe Awards	Best Actor – Miniseries or Television Film	Monster: The Ed Gein Story	Nominated	
2026	Critics' Choice Television Awards	Best Actor in a Movie/Miniseries	Monster: The Ed Gein Story	Nominated	
2026	Actor Awards	Outstanding Performance by a Male Actor in a Miniseries or Television Movie	Monster: The Ed Gein Story	Nominated	
2026	Primetime Emmy Awards	Outstanding Lead Actor in a Limited or Anthology Series or Movie	Monster: The Ed Gein Story	Nominated	
