= Lost City of Z (disambiguation) =

Lost City of Z is a fabled lost city in the Amazon.

Lost City of Z may also refer to:

- The Lost City of Z (book), a 2005 New Yorker article and 2009 book by David Grann
- The Lost City of Z (film), a 2016 film directed by James Gray

== See also ==
- The Lost City of D, an American film released in 2022
