= The Devil and Sherlock Holmes =

2010 book by David Grann

- Kindle cover
- Author: David Grann
- Language: English
- Genre: Non-fiction
- Publisher: Doubleday
- Publication date: 2010
- Publication place: United States
- English publication date: March 9, 2010
- Media type: Print (hardcover)
- Pages: 350 pp
- ISBN: 978-0-385-51792-8
- LC Class: PN4874.G672A25 2010
- Preceded by: The Lost City of Z
- Followed by: Killers of the Flower Moon

The Devil and Sherlock Holmes: Tales of Murder, Madness, and Obsession (2010) is a collection of 12 articles (essays) by American journalist David Grann.

== Essays ==
The essays were previously published between 2000 and 2009 in The New Yorker, The New York Times Magazine, The New Republic and The Atlantic, and have been "updated and revised". The stories are about real-life mysteries, a "mosaic of ambition, deception, passion, and folly."

Four of the stories have been filmed or optioned, and five of the stories have been collected in other "best" anthology volumes. It is Grann's second book, after The Lost City of Z (2009) published the previous year, and his first collected anthology of essays.

== Critical response ==
In The New York Times, Sam Roberts called the book "riveting." Writing in Entertainment Weekly, critic Keith Staskiewicz gave the collection a grade of A: "This collection of David Grann's nonfiction, much of it from The New Yorker, is by turns horrifying, hilarious, and outlandish... These straightforward tales grip you as unrelentingly as the suckered appendages of the giant squid Grann attempts to track down in 'The Squid Hunter.' You might feel that some of the pieces skirt credibility, but remember, as Holmes himself once said, "Life is infinitely stranger than anything which the mind of man could invent."

== Editions ==
- Grann, David. The Devil and Sherlock Holmes: Tales of Murder, Madness, and Obsession. March 9, 2010. Doubleday. ISBN 978-0-385-51792-8 (hardcover, first edition).

== Contents ==
Chapter number	Part	Chapter title	Year published	Source(s)	Related articles	Adaptations
01	Part 1	Mysterious Circumstances	2004	The New Yorker, December 13, 2004. The Best American Crime Writing 2005	Richard Lancelyn Green, Category:Sherlock Holmes	
02	Part 1	Trial by Fire	2009	The New Yorker, September 7, 2009.	Cameron Todd Willingham	Trial by Fire (2018), film directed by Edward Zwick
03	Part 1	The Chameleon	2008	The New Yorker, August 11, 2008.	Frédéric Bourdin	
04	Part 1	True Crime	2008	The New Yorker, February 11, 2008. The Best American Crime Reporting 2009	Krystian Bala	Dark Crimes (2016), film directed by Alexandros Avranas
05	Part 1	Which Way Did He Run?	2002	The New York Times Magazine, January 13, 2002.	September 11 attacks	
06	Part 2	The Squid Hunter	2004	The New Yorker, May 24, 2004.	Giant squid, Steve O'Shea	
07	Part 2	City of Water	2003	The New Yorker, September 1, 2003.	Sandhog, Water infrastructure of New York City	Optioned for film by Paramount in 2010.
08	Part 2	The Old Man and the Gun	2003	The New Yorker, January 27, 2003. The Best American Crime Writing 2004	Forrest Tucker	The Old Man & the Gun (2018), film directed by David Lowery
09	Part 2	Stealing Time	2005	The New Yorker, September 12, 2005. The Best American Sports Writing 2006	Rickey Henderson	
10	Part 3	The Brand	2004	The New Yorker, February 16, 2004.	Aryan Brotherhood	
11	Part 3	Crimetown, U.S.A.	2000	The New Republic, July 10, 2000. Wise Guys: Stories of Mobsters from Jersey to Vegas	James Traficant	
12	Part 3	Giving the 'Devil' His Due	2001	The Atlantic, June, 2001.	Toto Constant	
