= Online Film Critics Society Awards 2017 =

21st Online Film Critics Society Awards

21st Online Film Critics Society Awards
- Date: December 28, 2017

Highlights
- Most nominations: 8 (The Shape of Water)

The 21st Online Film Critics Society Awards, honoring the best in film for 2017, were announced on December 17, 2017.

== Nominees ==
Best Picture	Best Director
Get Out; The Shape of Water (Runner-up); Call Me by Your Name; Dunkirk; The Florida Project; A Ghost Story; Lady Bird; Mother!; Phantom Thread; Three Billboards Outside Ebbing, Missouri	Christopher Nolan – Dunkirk; Guillermo del Toro – The Shape of Water (Runner-up) [TIE]; Jordan Peele – Get Out (Runner-up) [TIE]; Paul Thomas Anderson – Phantom Thread; Greta Gerwig – Lady Bird
Best Actor	Best Actress
Gary Oldman – Darkest Hour; Daniel Kaluuya – Get Out (Runner-up); Timothée Chalamet – Call Me by Your Name; James Franco – The Disaster Artist; Robert Pattinson – Good Time	Sally Hawkins – The Shape of Water; Frances McDormand – Three Billboards Outside Ebbing, Missouri (Runner-up); Cynthia Nixon – A Quiet Passion; Margot Robbie – I, Tonya; Saoirse Ronan – Lady Bird
Best Supporting Actor	Best Supporting Actress
Sam Rockwell – Three Billboards Outside Ebbing, Missouri; Richard Jenkins – The Shape of Water (Runner-up); Armie Hammer – Call Me by Your Name; Patrick Stewart – Logan; Michael Stuhlbarg – Call Me by Your Name	Laurie Metcalf – Lady Bird; Allison Janney – I, Tonya (Runner-up); Mary J. Blige – Mudbound; Tiffany Haddish – Girls Trip; Holly Hunter – The Big Sick
Best Animated Feature	Best Film Not in the English Language
Coco; The Breadwinner (Runner-up); In This Corner of the World; The Lego Batman Movie; Loving Vincent	BPM (Beats Per Minute); The Square (Runner-up); First They Killed My Father; Nocturama; Raw; Thelma
Best Documentary	Best Breakout Star (non-competitive category)
Faces Places; Jane (Runner-up); Dawson City: Frozen Time; Ex Libris: The New York Public Library; The Work	Timothée Chalamet – Call Me by Your Name; Daniel Kaluuya – Get Out (Runner-up); Tiffany Haddish – Girls Trip; Dafne Keen – Logan; Brooklynn Prince – The Florida Project
Best Adapted Screenplay	Best Original Screenplay
James Ivory – Call Me by Your Name; Scott Neustadter and Michael H. Weber – The Disaster Artist (Runner-up); Sofia Coppola – The Beguiled; James Gray – The Lost City of Z; Aaron Sorkin – Molly's Game	Jordan Peele – Get Out; Martin McDonagh – Three Billboards Outside Ebbing, Missouri (Runner-up); Paul Thomas Anderson – Phantom Thread; Guillermo del Toro and Vanessa Taylor – The Shape of Water; Greta Gerwig – Lady Bird
Best Editing	Best Cinematography
Lee Smith – Dunkirk; Paul Machliss and Jonathan Amos – Baby Driver (Runner-up); Ben Safdie and Ronald Bronstein – Good Time; Tatiana S. Riegel – I, Tonya; Sidney Wolinsky – The Shape of Water	Roger Deakins – Blade Runner 2049; Dan Laustsen – The Shape of Water (Runner-up); Hoyte van Hoytema – Dunkirk; Darius Khondji – The Lost City of Z; Rachel Morrison – Mudbound
Best Ensemble
Three Billboards Outside Ebbing, Missouri; Get Out; Lady Bird; Mudbound; The Post; The Shape of Water
