= White Darkness =

White Darkness or The White Darkness may refer to:

- White Darkness (album), by the Swedish rock band Nightingale
- White Darkness (novel), a Doctor Who novel by David A. McIntee
- The White Darkness (film), a 2002 collaboration between Richard Stanley and Simon Boswell
- The White Darkness (Grann book), a 2018 non-fiction book by David Grann
- The White Darkness (novel), a children's novel by Geraldine McCaughrean
