= The Wager: A Tale of Shipwreck, Mutiny and Murder =

2023 history book by David Grann

- First edition cover design
- Author: David Grann
- Language: English
- Subject: Wager Mutiny
- Genre: Nonfiction
- Publisher: Doubleday
- Publication date: April 18, 2023
- Publication place: United States
- Media type: Print, e-book
- Pages: 352 pp. (hardcover)
- ISBN: 978-0385534260 (Hardcover)
- Dewey Decimal: 910.9164/1
- LC Class: G530.W25 G73 2023
- Preceded by: The White Darkness

The Wager: A Tale of Shipwreck, Mutiny and Murder is the fifth nonfiction book by American journalist David Grann. The book describes the Wager Mutiny. It was published on April 18, 2023, by Doubleday. The book became a bestseller, topping The New York Times best-seller list in the nonfiction category for its first week of publication. It stayed on their list of best-selling hardcover non-fiction books for 66 weeks.

== Theme ==
The book concerns HMS Wager, a square-rigged sixth-rate Royal Navy ship, and the mutiny that took place after the ship's wrecking in 1741.

== Reception ==
In their starred review, Kirkus Reviews wrote: "Recounting the tumultuous events in tense detail, Grann sets the Wager episode in the context of European imperialism as much as the wrath of the sea. A brisk, absorbing history and a no-brainer for fans of the author's suspenseful historical thrillers." Publishers Weekly wrote that Grann "packs the narrative with fascinating details about life at sea [...] and makes excellent use of primary sources". Matthew Teague of The Guardian commented, "There's an expectation, in reviewing a book like The Wager, to balance its strengths with some discussion of its flaws. But The Wager is one of the finest nonfiction books I've ever read. I can only offer the highest praise a writer can give: endless envy, as deep and salty as the sea." Chris Vognar of The Boston Globe wrote, "Grann guides us through this process, step by step, storm by storm, man by man, in prose that the writers he references, including Herman Melville and Joseph Conrad, would appreciate." Carl Hoffman of The Washington Post described the book as "almost pure, horror-filled plot, without the usual Grannian first-person moments, a tightly written, relentless, blow-by-blow account that is hard to put down, even as there are sometimes frustrating narrative gaps, a result of the limits of nonfiction grappling with 280-year-old events."

== Adaptations ==
In July 2022, Martin Scorsese and Leonardo DiCaprio acquired the screen rights to the book. The project is supposed to reteam the key actors and companies standing behind the recent adaptation of Grann's previous book Killers of the Flower Moon.

In January 2024, an abridged version of the book was broadcast on BBC Radio 4's Book of the Week.
