= Krystian Bala =

Polish writer and murderer (born 1974)

Krystian Bala (born 1974) is a Polish murderer, self-published writer, and photographer. In 2000, Bala murdered Dariusz Janiszewski, a small business owner in Wrocław, after Janiszewski went on a date with Bala's wife. The case was not solved until three years later, when a detective linked the murder to events in Bala's 2003 novel Amok, which contained events that were incredibly similar to the murder and details that would be only known by the murderer. Bala was sentenced to 25 years in prison.

== Murder of Dariusz Janiszewski ==
In 2007, Bala was sentenced to jail for 25 years for planning and committing the murder of Dariusz Janiszewski, a Polish small business owner, in Wrocław in 2000. Janiszewski's dead body was discovered floating in a lake. For three years the Wrocław police had failed to solve the murder, until a detective found some physical clues linking the murder to Bala. More sensationally, clues to the killing were found in Bala's first novel Amok (2003), published three years after Janiszewski's death. It was as if Bala had written a "fictionalized" version of the real-life killing into his novel, using information only the murderer could have known. The case drew widespread media coverage in Poland and resulted in increased sales of the novel as readers looked for clues in the novel to the real-life events of Janiszewski's death.

Prosecutors believed the motive for the killing was tied to jealousy, as Bala had hired a private investigator to spy on his wife, and found out she went on a date with Janiszewski.

In 2007 while Bala was in prison, an appeals court ordered a retrial of the case. In December 2008, Bala had a new trial and was again found guilty and continued to serve a 25-year sentence. Bala is working on a second novel tentatively titled De Liryk. Police report evidence found on his computer showed plans for killing a new victim to tie in with his second novel.

== Media ==
The case was the subject of a 2008 investigative article by David Grann in The New Yorker, called "True Crime", later published in The Devil and Sherlock Holmes: Tales of Murder, Madness, and Obsession (2010). In 2010, Grann's article was optioned to be made into a movie by Focus Films. The completed film, Dark Crimes (formerly titled True Crimes), was shown at the Warsaw Film Festival in October 2016, and the Berlin International Film Festival the following February before being picked up for US distribution in April 2017. The crime was also the subject of a dramatization in one segment of True Nightmares, Season 1, Ep.6, "No Way to Die", first aired November 18, 2015.

The case was also covered by Casefile True Crime Podcast on 15 October 2016, and by Criminal podcast on 23 January 2026.

In 2017, Krystian Bala's book Amok was the inspiration for the feature film Amok directed by Kasia Adamik. It was released theatrically in Poland on March 24, 2017. At the 42nd Polish Feature Film Festival in Gdansk, Łukasz Simlat won an award for Best Supporting Actor.
