= Flower Moon =

Flower Moon may refer to:

- A full moon
- "Flower Moon", a track on the Vampire Weekend album Father of the Bride (album)
- Flower moon, a phenomenon of fields of blooms featured in the book and the film discussed below
  - Killers of the Flower Moon (book), a nonfiction book about Osage murders by David Grann
  - Killers of the Flower Moon, a film adaptation of the book
