= Pan-American Association of Film & Television Journalists =

The Pan-American Association of Film & Television Journalists, also known as the PAAFTJ Television Awards, is an annual awards ceremony held by a non-profit organization headquartered in Burbank, California. The first annual awards were given on July 8, 2012. The PAAFTJ honors the best achievements in commercial and non-commercial television in the US. The members of PAAFTJ vote annually for the PAAFTJ Television Awards, which are presented to outstanding shows in fields such as drama, comedy, variety, and animation. As of 2013, the categories have been reduced to 45.

At the first ceremony, Community won Best Comedy Series, Breaking Bad won Best Drama Series, Sherlock won Best Miniseries or TV Movie, The Late Late Show with Craig Ferguson won Best Variety Series, and Archer won Best Animated Series.
