= Dark Crimes =

- Theatrical release poster
- Directed by: Alexandros Avranas
- Screenplay by: Jeremy Brock
- Based on: "True Crime" by David Grann
- Produced by: John Cheng; David Gerson; Simon Horsman; Brett Ratner; Jeffrey Soros
- Starring: Jim Carrey; Marton Csokas; Charlotte Gainsbourg; Agata Kulesza; Kati Outinen; Zbigniew Zamachowski
- Cinematography: Michal Englert
- Edited by: Agnieszka Glinska
- Music by: Richard Patrick; Tobias Enhus
- Production companies: RatPac Entertainment; InterTitle Films; Los Angeles Media Fund; Opus Film
- Distributed by: Saban Films
- Release dates: October 12, 2016 (Warsaw Film Festival); May 18, 2018 (United States)
- Running time: 92 minutes
- Countries: Poland; United States
- Language: English
- Budget: €3.8 million
- Box office: $21,216

Dark Crimes is a 2016 crime drama film directed by Alexandros Avranas and written by Jeremy Brock. The film was based on a 2008 article in The New Yorker by David Grann titled "True Crime: A Postmodern Murder Mystery", about convicted murderer Krystian Bala who supposedly wrote a fictionalized novel about a murder he committed. The film stars Jim Carrey as a detective who notices similarities between a cold case murder and a best-selling novel. The supporting cast includes Agata Kulesza, Charlotte Gainsbourg, Kati Outinen, Zbigniew Zamachowski, and Marton Csokas.

Producer Brett Ratner had True Crimes in development since 2010. Principal photography began on 12 November 2015 in Kraków, Poland and ended a month later. It held its premiere at the Warsaw Film Festival on 12 October 2016 with the title True Crimes, and had a limited theatrical release in only a few countries, such as the United States, in 2018. Despite some praise for the cast, critics panned Dark Crimes for its pacing, overly downcast tone, and presentation of abused women. It is one of the worst-reviewed films of 2018, holding a 0% approval rating on Rotten Tomatoes.

== Plot ==
In Warsaw, Poland, Tadek is an unhappily married detective who takes on the cold case involving the murder of a businessman, Daniel Sadowsky. To his and everyone's surprise the case is identical to a character's murder in a recently published novel by a man named Kozlov. In the process of trying to prove Kozlov's guilt for the murder, Tadek discovers a building called the 'sex cage' where women are brought to be abused and raped by businessmen. He sees videotape showing both Kozlov and Sadowsky being at the sex cage and participating in the abuse of women. Convinced of Kozlov's guilt, Tadek arrests Kozlov and questions him. He has no hard evidence, so Kozlov is set free. Frustrated that he is being outsmarted, Tadek sneaks into Kozlov's apartment and tries to plant a recording device, but is interrupted when Kozlov and his girlfriend Kasia enter. Tadek sneaks out, but goes back the next day to visit Kasia and questions her. Kasia tells Tadek that she never feels safe, seduces him and they have rough sex.

Kozlov taunts Tadek telling him that he will be ruined for trying to pin a crime on an innocent man and insinuates he knows about Kasia and Tadek being intimate, accusing him "You raped her." Tadek goes to Kasia's apartment again and gets angry with her, threatening custody of her eight-year-old daughter due to her drug abuse, coercing her to sign a statement saying Kozlov killed Sadowsky. Tadek arrests Kozlov again, and shows him Kasia's statement, to which Kozlov signs a confession for Sadowsky's murder and is brought to jail. Even though the next day Tadek reads a newspaper article showing that Kozlov was out of the country when Sadowsky was murdered, his corrupt newly promoted chief of police Piotr isn't interested. In fact, Piotr also reveals he fed case details to Tadek and had him followed. Frustrated, Tadek gives proof of Kozlov's innocence to a TV journalist as a media leak.

Stopping by his elderly mother's apartment, he sobs after finding her dead on the living room floor. He then goes home to find his wife and daughter have left him. Earlier, his wife threatened him over his obsession over this case.

The next morning, following Kasia to the 'sex cage' location, he visits her there, apologizes for his anger during their last meeting. Kasia serves them both a shot of liquor, which they drink, and sit down. He asks her to tell him what happened in her interaction with Daniel Sadowski, saying "that's all I have left" --- the truth. Kasia tells Tadek that Sadowsky was a sadist who would often have her play dead as he raped her. She took drugs to numb the pain he caused. He often forced her to choke him. One time, she choked him but didn't stop until she killed him. Kozlov helped her clean it up and is taking the fall for her. She tells him that kind of love is rare, saying Koslov and her daughter are her only family and nothing will get in its way. She walks away as the camera pans over to Tadek, showing him slumped back on the couch, having died from the poison in the shot Kasia gave him before confessing to the murder.

== Cast ==
- Jim Carrey as Tadek
- Marton Csokas as Kozlov
- Charlotte Gainsbourg as Kasia
- Agata Kulesza as Marta
- Kati Outinen as Malinowska
- Zbigniew Zamachowski as Lukasz
- Danuta Kowalska as Kozlov's Mother

== Development ==
An article from The Hollywood Reporter published on 29 September 2010 revealed Brett Ratner's company RatPac Entertainment was developing a film named True Crimes with Focus Features. On 7 April 2011, Deadline Hollywood reported that the script was written by Jeremy Brock, and Roman Polanski was "circling" the project. On 7 June 2013, The Hollywood Reporter revealed Focus Features dropped out in 2012, and Christoph Waltz would play Jacek Wroblewski. On 14 May 2015, TheWrap announced that Waltz was replaced with Jim Carrey for Wroblewski and that Miss Violence (2013) director Alexandros Avranas would direct True Crimes; David Gerson, Ewa Puszczyńska, and Michael Aguilar were also revealed to be producers.

== Production ==
Principal photography on the film began on 12 November 2015 in Kraków, Poland, wrapping up on 14 December 2015. After filming completed, Carrey kept the beard he grew for his role while presenting the 73rd Golden Globe Awards, garnering several Twitter reaction posts. Although the filming location and most of the crew of True Crimes was Polish, the film was an international production due to its actors coming from various countries, such as Canada (Carrey), Britain (Gainsbourg), Romania (Ivanov), and Finland (Outinen); and some of its producers being American and Canadian. Due to the Poland setting of the subject of the New Yorker story, producers David Gerson and Kasia Nabiałczyk contacted the biggest figure of the film industry in Poland, Opus Film, to help on True Crimes; the company was most known for Ida (2015), a film that, only months before True Crimes began principal photography, won an Academy Award.

According to Culture.pl, this plus the cast and crew of the film coming from various countries indicated a re-interest in Polish cinema worldwide. Polish film journalist Darek Kuźma, writing a feature upon True Crimes' 2016 premiere at Warsaw, reported "opportunities in the rapidly developing Polish film industry, with its quality casts and crews, its variety of locations that can stand in for almost every part of the world, and its growing number of regional film commissions." The Polish Film Institute contributed €446,000 to True Crimes' €4 million budget. Explained Ewa Puszczyńska, who attached the Polish Film Institute as well as the Kraków Film Commission for financing, "We’ve made a film with American producers, and international stars, for a fraction of what it would have cost in the US or Western Europe."

== Release ==
The first stills of True Crimes were released on 27 November 2015. The film had its world premiere at the Warsaw Film Festival on 12 October 2016, under the name True Crimes. Saban Films picked up the distribution rights for North America on 4 April 2017. On 25 January 2018, Jim Carrey announced that the film's title had been changed to Dark Crimes and that the North American theatrical release would likely occur in April. Myrkur's song "Skøgen Skulle Dø" was used in the trailer. The U.S. theatrical release was later announced as 18 May 2018, with an earlier DirecTV exclusive release on 19 April. Internationally, Dark Crimes only ran for one week in Colombia, Italy, and Hungary; and only for a week longer in Portugal.

Dark Crimes was released to Blu-ray in Canada on 17 July 2018, the United States on 31 July 2018, Sweden on 30 January 2019, Italy on 7 February 2019, France on 2 May 2019, and Germany on 14 June 2019. Dark Crimes also garnered DVD releases in the United States, issued on 31 July 2018; and Taiwan, on 28 June 2019. Wal-mart exclusively sold versions of the Blu-ray that were also packed with a DVD.

== Critical response ==
Metacritic review
breakdown (unweighted)

Positive
0 (0%)
Mixed
4 (29%)
Negative
10 (71%)

On the review aggregator website Rotten Tomatoes, 0% of 36 critics' reviews are positive, with an average rating of 2.7/10. The website's consensus reads: "Dark Crimes is a rote, unpleasant thriller that fails to parlay its compelling true story and a committed Jim Carrey performance into even modest chills." Metacritic, which uses a weighted average, assigned the film a score of 24 out of 100, based on 14 critics, indicating "generally unfavorable" reviews.

Before the film's release, publications such as The Playlist and The Independent were excited for the project due to the involvements of Avranas, Gainsbourg, and Kulesza; but were a bit skeptical due to Carrey's previous involvement in a dark thriller, The Number 23 (2007), which had an underwhelming reception. Marshall Lemon, responding to the November 2015 still revelations, wrote Carrey "absolutely looks the part," and "the visual style is also reminiscent of shows like True Detective which transformed actors like Woody Harrelson and Matthew McConaughey into surprising dramatic presences. If True Crimes can do the same for Carrey, it might just be worth keeping an eye on."

Upon its release, Metacritic's editorial stated that "this Polish-set but English-language entry stars a bearded, accented, against-type (and, apparently, against-ability) Jim Carrey in a bleak, violent crime thriller described by critics as "misogynistic," "depressing," "ugly," and "abysmal."" It was the eighth lowest-ranking 2018 film on the site. Reviews targeted the film's overly "gloomy and unexciting" tone (noting that it ruined the film's potential plot), as well as the slow pacing and excessively tense build.

Owen Gleiberman of Variety found the pacing especially problematic, writing that the details of the mystery were "all far too obvious." The New York Times called the last act its best part, simply for having far more action than the earlier sequences do. The A.V. Club summarized the film by writing that it replaced the "source material’s appealing elements and characterizations with overcomplicated thriller clichés and humorless prurience." IGN critic Witney Seibold lambasted its predictable plot, noting that "it can be seen in just about every episode of Law & Order: Criminal Intent." The film's exploitative scenes involving physical and sexual abuse of women also turned several critics off; a critic from Slant Magazine described those scenes as "blatantly misogynistic."

The film's technical aspects had a mixed critical reception. The A.V. Club summarized the directing as "leaden and one-note in its attempt to imitate the bleakness of Swedish and Norwegian crime imports in an indifferent Eastern European setting; the sky is always overcast and the characters are all dressed like they’re on their way to a funeral." Similarly, The New York Observer panned the "ugly, sterile sets" and described the photography as poor, while SF Weekly called the shot compositions gimmicky, and Oktay Kozak Ege opined that the "aesthetically repetitive" visuals made the tension sequences more unbearable to watch. In contrast, Consequence of Sound writer Randall Colburn stated that "Avranas' muted, sterile style pops with a few flourishes, mainly in his knack for cultivating a truly unsettling aura around the starkness of the film’s depravity." He also praised the use of POV shots for "creating a curious sense of alienation, as if one is both inside the film but outside of its truth, looking in at the larger reality." Luke W. Thompson of Forbes applauded the editing and directing for matching the mood of the story, and David Lewis of the San Francisco Chronicle honored its "impressive" production design.

Opinions about Carrey's performance ranged from positive (with some calling it the film's only redeeming factor) to very negative, with some calling it his worst-ever dramatic performance. There were several criticisms of his attempt at a Polish accent. And Gleiberman wrote that "Carrey broods and stares like an actor who’s out to muffle any hint of his natural spirit by swathing it in poker-faced gloom." The character of Tadek was also criticized as "underwritten," as "an ordinary person doing his ordinary job [...] even if the circumstances are extraordinary." Colburn explained, "Tadek is a character written to be devoid of charm or humor and, as such, Carrey has no opportunities to draw upon the anxious, springy energy of Man on the Moon or the desperate, aching despair of Eternal Sunshine." IGN wrote that the character was too "empty" for someone supposedly obsessed with the case he was solving.

The supporting actors, such as Csokas, Outinen, Ivanov, and Gainsbourg, were positively commented on. Some critics found Csokas to be the film's best actor: Thompson explained that he "strikes the right balance of legitimate rage and pretentious self-importance that you could imagine youngsters embracing." However, Colburn felt that Csokas' "icky vein of cruelty", Gainsbourg's "compelling bloodletting", and Wieckiewicz's "pulp paperback" style contradicted the tone of Carrey's performance, resulting in an "imbalance that serves to sink the film."

== See also ==
- List of films with a 0% rating on Rotten Tomatoes
