= The Lost City of Z (film) =

2016 American film directed by James Gray

- Theatrical release poster
- Directed by: James Gray
- Screenplay by: James Gray
- Based on: The Lost City of Z 2009 book by David Grann
- Produced by: Dede Gardner; Jeremy Kleiner; Anthony Katagas; James Gray; Dale Armin Johnson
- Starring: Charlie Hunnam; Robert Pattinson; Sienna Miller; Tom Holland; Angus Macfadyen; Ian McDiarmid; Franco Nero
- Cinematography: Darius Khondji
- Edited by: John Axelrad; Lee Haugen
- Music by: Christopher Spelman
- Production companies: Plan B Entertainment; Sierra Pictures; MICA Entertainment; Northern Ireland Screen; Keep Your Head Productions; MadRiver Pictures
- Distributed by: Amazon Studios; Bleecker Street
- Release dates: October 15, 2016 (NYFF); April 14, 2017 (United States)
- Running time: 140 minutes
- Country: United States
- Language: English
- Budget: $30 million
- Box office: $19 million

The Lost City of Z is a 2016 American epic biographical adventure drama film written and directed by James Gray, based on the 2009 book of the same name by David Grann. It portrays British explorer Percy Fawcett, who was sent to Brazil and made several attempts to find a supposed ancient lost city in the Amazon. It stars Charlie Hunnam as Fawcett; Robert Pattinson as his fellow explorer Henry Costin; Sienna Miller as his wife, Nina Fawcett; and Tom Holland as his son, Jack.

Its world premiere was on October 15, 2016, as the closing-night selection at the New York Film Festival. It was released in the United States on April 14, 2017 by Amazon Studios and Bleecker Street. It was praised by critics, but grossed only $19 million against a $30 million budget. Despite its lack of financial success, Time magazine listed it as one of its Top 10 Films of 2017.

"Z" is pronounced "zed", as spoken in the United Kingdom, by the characters in the film. It was pronounced "zee" by the British actors in the American versions of promotional material to suit the local market.

== Plot ==
In 1905, Percy Fawcett is a young British major who participates in a stag hunt on an Irish baronial estate for the visiting Archduke Franz Ferdinand’s benefit. A skilled horseman and marksman, he brings down the stag swiftly, but is snubbed at the after-hunt party.

A year later, Fawcett meets officials of the Royal Geographical Society (RGS) in London, where he is informed that the governments of Bolivia and Brazil are nearly at war over the location of their mutual boundary. Directly affecting the region’s extremely lucrative rubber trade, they have asked the British government to survey it.

Fawcett leads the survey party, meeting Corporal Henry Costin, who is familiar with the Amazon rainforest, aboard the ship to Brazil. At a large rubber plantation in the jungle owned by Portuguese nobleman Baron de Gondoris, they meet Lance Corporal Arthur Manley, who tells them the British government advises against further exploration. Nevertheless, Fawcett and Costin, along with several guides and Amazonian scout Tadjui, complete the mission.

Tadjui tells him stories about a legendary jungle city covered in gold and full of people. Fawcett dismisses this as insane ravings, but he soon discovers highly advanced broken pottery and some small stone statues in the jungle, convincing him of the story’s veracity.

Upon his return, Fawcett is praised, and his wife, Nina (Sienna Miller), has given birth to their second son. In the Trinity College Library of Dublin, she discovers a conquistador text telling of a city deep in the Amazonian jungle, which Fawcett names “the Lost City of Z”. He also meets renowned biologist James Murray, who agrees to back his Amazon expedition to find that lost city. Attempting to convince RGS members for backing, he is initially ridiculed, but ultimately they concede to further exploration.

Murray, unfamiliar with the rigors of the deep jungle, greatly slows them down. Fawcett’s party is attacked along the river, but he makes peace with the natives. Murray’s leg injury becomes severely infected, and he begins to succumb to madness. Fawcett sends him off with a native guide and their last pack animal to find aid. However, the rest of the team abandons the expedition after discovering that Murray had poured paraffin on their supplies.

Fawcett arrives home and is introduced to his daughter. Murray survives and, in front of RGS trustees, accuses Fawcett of abandoning him in the jungle, demanding an apology. Fawcett opts to resign from the society rather than do so. When World War I breaks out in Europe, Fawcett fights in France. Manley dies in the trenches at the Battle of the Somme and Fawcett is temporarily blinded in a chlorine gas attack whilst leading an infantry attack. His estranged eldest, Jack, who had long accused Fawcett of abandoning them, reconciles with him as he recovers.

In 1923, Fawcett is living in obscurity in Britain. American interest in exploring the Amazon has escalated, mostly due to Fawcett’s stories of the lost city. John D. Rockefeller Jr. and a consortium of U.S. newspapers finance a new Fawcett expedition. The RGS co-funds it at the last moment to maintain British pride. Fawcett shows Sir John Scott Keltie a compass, telling him that he will send it back to him once he finds the lost city.

Fawcett and his son go alone this time, travelling as light as possible for up to three years to find “Z”. Costin declines an invitation to join them. The Fawcetts are attacked by natives and run off, only to be stopped by a second tribe, who say that the Englishmen's spirits aren’t wholly of their own world. They declare their spirits “must belong” somewhere, so they will help them find their rightful place. The Fawcetts are drugged during a ceremony and carried away.

Years later, Nina Fawcett has a meeting with Keltie at the RGS, claiming she has heard that Fawcett and Jack are still alive and living with tribespeople. The RGS, having sent over a hundred people to search for Fawcett over the years, refuses to do another search; Keltie advises Nina to accept her husband’s death. She refuses, showing him the compass Fawcett had promised to send once he found the lost city. As Nina leaves, her reflection in a mirror shows her walking out into what looks like the Amazonian jungle.

== Cast ==
- Charlie Hunnam as Percy Fawcett
- Robert Pattinson as Corporal Henry Costin
- Tom Holland as Jack Fawcett
  - Bobby Smalldridge as 7-year-old Jack Fawcett
  - Tom Mulheron as young Jack Fawcett
- Edward Ashley as Corporal Arthur Manley (Note: His real name was Henry Manley, but he was renamed Arthur Manley in the movie, possibly to avoid confusion between him and Henry Costin.)
- Sienna Miller as Nina Fawcett
- Angus Macfadyen as James Murray
- Clive Francis as Sir John Scott Keltie
- Ian McDiarmid as Sir George Goldie
- Pedro Coello as Tadjui
- Franco Nero as Baron de Gondoriz
- Harry Melling as William Barclay
- John Sackville as Simon Beauclerk
- Adam Bellamy as Cecil Gosling
- Daniel Huttlestone as Brian Fawcett
- Murray Melvin as Lord James Bernard
- Elena Solovey as Madame Kumel

== Production ==
"[David Lean, but with a] slightly more hallucinogenic feel, because [Fawcett] went to the jungle and sorta went mad. […] I hope it’s not my Fitzcarraldo."

— James Gray

=== Development ===
In February 2009, James Gray was hired by Paramount Pictures and Plan B Entertainment to write and direct the film based on David Grann's book, but the film remained in development for six years. Based on his experience on previous projects, Gray was not initially sure why Plan B sent him the book. He explained:

When I was sent the book in the fall of 2008, it hadn’t yet been published. I didn’t know what it was and I hadn’t heard of the story at all. It takes place outside of New York, and it’s a period piece in the United Kingdom and the jungle. So I had no idea why the people at Plan B decided to send me this book, because nothing in my prior work had shown that I could do anything like this. Maybe it was an act of madness on their part.

In a 2015 interview with IndieWire, Gray admitted that he had developed the script for a while before moving toward production. He explained that the film was a "very complicated production and the story is amazing, but it's a complicated story. And you want to get it right. It's a very, very scary proposition to go into the jungle and all that. But at the same time it's terrific. It's why you make movies."

=== Casting ===
The lead role underwent numerous casting changes. Brad Pitt was initially set to star as Fawcett and to produce the film through his company Plan B Entertainment. In November 2010, Pitt withdrew from the lead role due to scheduling conflicts, but remained attached as producer. On September 4, 2013, Benedict Cumberbatch came on board to portray Fawcett, along with Robert Pattinson, who joined the cast in the role of Costin. In February 2015, Cumberbatch dropped out also due to scheduling conflicts, and was replaced by Charlie Hunnam, while Sienna Miller was cast as Nina Fawcett.

=== Filming ===
Principal photography began on August 19, 2015, in Belfast, Northern Ireland, and continued for five weeks until late September. On August 28, the production shot at Greyabbey Village and Strangford Lough in Northern Ireland. Hunnam and Miller filmed scenes at Ballintoy, County Antrim, on August 31, and further shooting took place at Craigavon House, East Belfast on September 2.

On September 7, 2015, scenes were filmed at Belfast City Hall and on the grounds of Royal Belfast Academical Institution. Scenes were also shot at Bangor Castle leisure centre on September 13, 2015. Filming then moved to Santa Marta, Colombia, and continued through September and October.

== Music ==
The Lost City of Z: Original Motion Picture Soundtrack

Film score soundtrack album
- Released: March 24, 2017
- Genre: Film score
- Length: 55:04
- Label: Filmtrax
- Producer: Christopher Spelman

Christopher Spelman chronology
The Immigrant (2013)	The Lost City of Z: Original Motion Picture Soundtrack (2017)

Christopher Spelman composed the film's musical score. He had previously composed the music for Gray's 2013 film The Immigrant, and had been arranger on The Yards (2000), We Own the Night (2007), and Two Lovers (2008). George Drakoulias and Randall Poster were music supervisors.

The film's trailer featured "Tangled Earth" by audiomachine. The soundtrack was released digitally on March 24, 2017.

No.	Title	Length
1.	"The Lost City of Z"	0:59
2.	"The Hunt"	2:35
3.	"The First Goodbye"	2:33
4.	"Onto the River"	2:29
5.	"The Letter"	2:05
6.	"City of Gold"	7:39
7.	"Source of the Verde River"	5:40
8.	"The Grenedier's Welcome"	1:34
9.	"The Argument"	2:25
10.	"The Attack"	2:20
11.	"Crossing the River"	3:16
12.	"Delusions"	2:51
13.	"Homecoming"	1:48
14.	"Confrontation"	3:47
15.	"In the Hospital"	3:33
16.	"The Chase"	1:40
17.	"The Final Journey"	7:50
Total length:		55:04

== Release ==
The film had its world premiere as the closing night film on October 15, 2016, at the 54th New York Film Festival. Prior to that, StudioCanal acquired international distribution rights to the film, while Amazon Studios obtained U.S. distribution rights. Bleecker Street is partnering with Amazon on the film's theatrical release. The film was released in the United States on April 14, 2017. The film was released in France on March 15, 2017 and in the UK on March 24, 2017.

In February 2017, the film was presented at the 67th Berlin International Film Festival in the Berlinale Special section. It also served as the opening night film of Boston International Film Festival on April 13, 2017.

The film released in China on June 2, 2017 but was trimmed by 37 minutes, totaling 104 minutes. The cuts were made by the film's producers to increase the chance of the film being commercially successful in China. At the time, exhibitors were not interested in showing films over two hours in length as it would cut into the total amount of screenings a theatre could have in a day.

== Reception ==
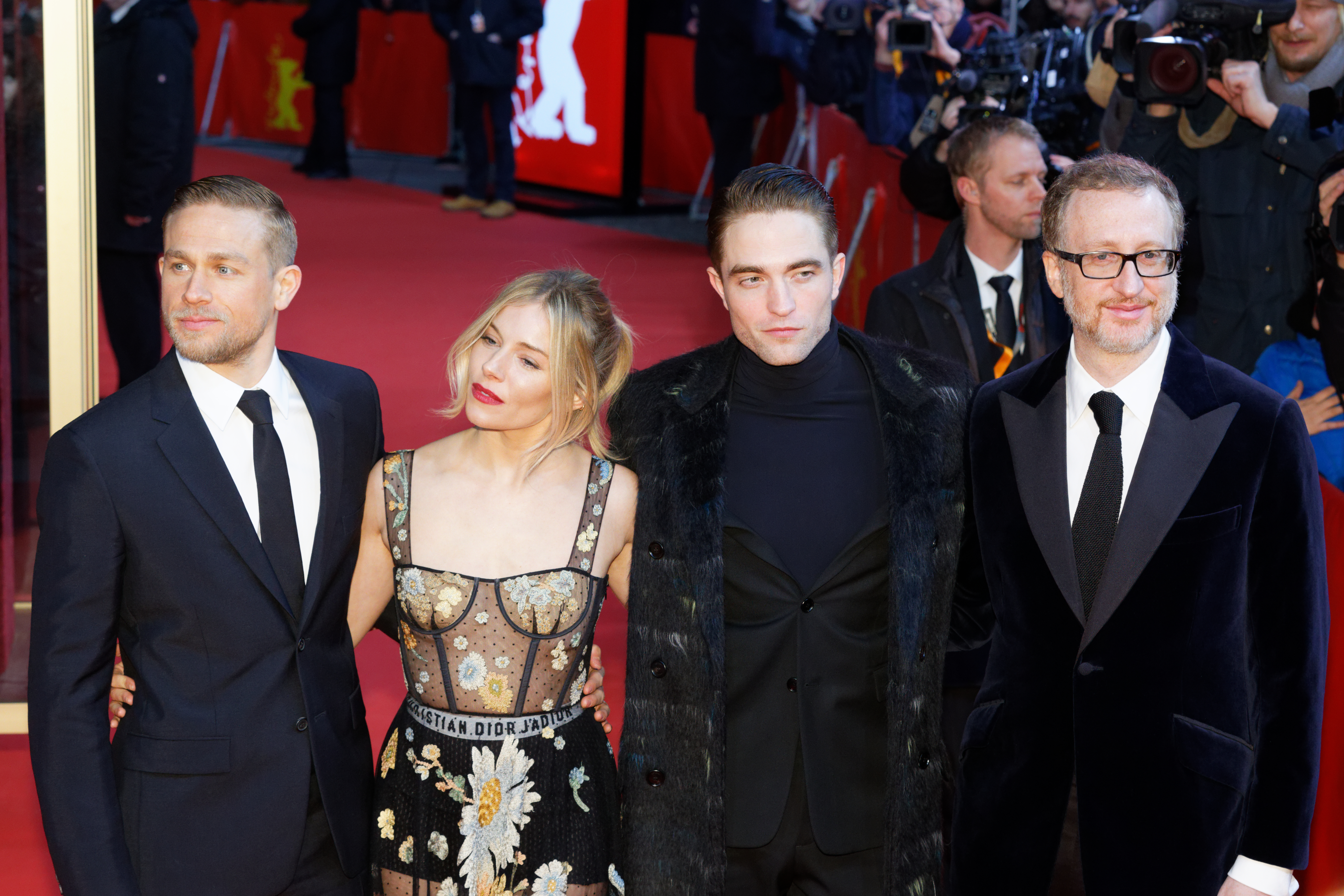
From left to right: Hunnam, Miller, Pattinson and Gray at the film's premiere at the 2017 Berlin International Film Festival.

=== Box office ===
The Lost City of Z grossed $8.6 million in the United States and Canada, and $10.7 million in other territories, for a worldwide total of $19.3 million, against a production budget of $30 million.

The Lost City of Z was first released in France on March 15 where it generated $770,719 on its opening weekend. This was followed by the United Kingdom and Ireland on March 24, earning £270,139 from 282 theatres. It debuted at number seven on the box office chart.

In the United States, the film grossed $110,175 from four theaters in its opening weekend. It expanded to 614 theaters the following weekend and made $2.2 million, finishing 10th at the box office. In its third weekend, the film added 252 theaters, and made $1.8 million.

=== Critical response ===
According to the review aggregator website Rotten Tomatoes, 86% of critics have given the film a positive review based on 250 reviews, with an average rating of 7.3/10. The site's critics consensus reads, "The Lost City of Z's stately pace and visual grandeur hearken back to classic exploration epics, and Charlie Hunnam turns in a masterful performance as its complex protagonist." At Metacritic, the film has a weighted average score of 78 out of 100 based on 44 critics, indicating "generally favorable reviews".

Todd McCarthy of The Hollywood Reporter described the film as "a rare piece of contemporary classical cinema." Dan Callahan in his review for TheWrap said that "The Lost City of Z feels like a clear artistic advance for Gray, who proves himself here as one of our finest and most distinctive living filmmakers." Owen Gleiberman, writing for Variety, called the film "a finely crafted, elegantly shot, sharply sincere movie that is more absorbing than powerful." Joshua Rothkopf in his review for Time Out wrote that "the grandeur of this movie is off the charts ..." Mark Kermode of Kermode and Mayo's Film Review stated that while the film had numerous flaws, such as ineffective elliptical storytelling and Hunnam's uncharismatic performance, "it is a film which is haunting me more than I thought. ... it did feel like it was trying [to] break out of being just that narrative into something else".

Explorer John Hemming criticized the movie's publicity for claiming that Fawcett was one of Britain's greatest explorers, arguing that this was an insult to the many true explorers, and that Fawcett was a racist, a "nutter", and a dangerous incompetent who "never discovered anything", but caused the loss of many lives. (Note: The new film 'The Lost City of Z' is being advertised as based on the true story of one of Britain’s greatest explorers. ... Greatest explorer? Fawcett? He was a surveyor who never discovered anything, a nutter, a racist, and so incompetent that the only expedition he organised was a five-week disaster. Calling him one of our greatest explorers ... is an insult to the huge roster of true explorers. ... Fawcett casually remarked that five out of his six peons died from the effects of this five-week disaster. ... When one aimed a drawn bow at him, Fawcett shot the man with a Mauser revolver – absolutely forbidden by Brazil’s Indian Service. ... In 1925, ... Fawcett ... committed other blunders that antagonised their hosts. So it was only a matter of days before they were all dead. — John Hemming, The Spectator, 1 April 2017)

Joe Morgenstern, a movie critic from The Wall Street Journal, compares the book to the movie by stating "Mr. Hunnam's Fawcett is attractive, and animated when circumstances demand it, but thanks to a clumsy script, not very interesting." In contrast to the book being more interested in the facts along with David Grann's findings.

Peter Travers, a film critic for Rolling Stone, rates The Lost City of Z three and a half stars out of four stars and describes the movie as "haunting and visionary, a potent provocation that gets under your skin." He then notes the complementary elements of The Lost City of Z being "exotic adventure, and the psychological terror that brushes Gray's metaphorical heart of darkness."

Dan Jolin, a freelance journalist, rates The Lost City of Z a four out of five stars on Empire. He states that though Fawcett's story is "a difficult story to end. ... Gray excels, going out on an oblique but elegant note." However he does note that The Lost City of Z may "test your patience" because of the scenes being prolonged to enhance the main character, Percy Fawcett.

Neil Soan, a reviewer, rates The Lost City of Z a three and a half stars out of five stars for The Times of India. In accordance to the role of the main character, Percy Fawcett, Soan believes "Charlie Hunnam adds ample substance to Fawcett" but he also points out that some main personality traits were lackluster. He concludes in his review that though the movie falls short on important scenes, "The lost City of Z an unbalanced but fascinating watch."

Manohla Dargis, a writer from The New York Times, writes that Charlie Hunnam was "mesmerizing" upon his main role of British explorer, Percy Fawcett. She believes Mr. Gray "Effortlessly expands his reach as he moves across time and continents and in the process turns the past into a singular life." She also notes the "lapidary details" that have helped polish The Lost City of Z into something more.

Anthony Lane, a film critic for the New Yorker, believes that the "right person for the role" is actually Robert Pattinson. The way he presents himself in the film as an "Unlikely figure, yet you still follow his every move" which is similar to how someone could think about Percy Fawcett. Despite this, Lane believes The Lost City of Z to be "beautiful, mournful, and measured."

Robbie Collin, a film critic from The Daily Telegraph, describes 'The Lost City of Z' as "a film transporting, profound, and staggering in its emotional power as anything I've seen in the cinema in years. He believes Charlie Hunnam suitably carries the role of Percy Fawcett with his "persuasiveness" demonstrated in roles prior to 'The Lost City of Z'.

David Sims, a staff writer at The Atlantic, writes that "The Lost City of Z is a miraculous movie at once moving, intimidating, and gorgeous to behold."

=== Accolades ===
Award	Date of ceremony	Category	Recipient(s) and nominee(s)	Result
Dublin Film Critics' Circle	February 26, 2017	Best Screenplay	James Gray	Runner-up
Florida Film Critics Circle	December 23, 2017	Best Adapted Screenplay	James Gray	Nominated
Golden Tomato Awards	January 3, 2018	Best Action Movie 2017	The Lost City of Z	4th Place
IndieWire Critics Poll	December 19, 2016	Most Anticipated of 2017	The Lost City of Z	10th Place
London Film Critics' Circle	January 28, 2018	Young British/Irish Performer of the Year	Tom Holland	Nominated
London Film Critics' Circle	January 28, 2018	Technical Achievement Award	Darius Khondji (cinematographer)	Nominated
Online Film Critics Society	December 28, 2017	Best Adapted Screenplay	James Gray	Nominated
Online Film Critics Society	December 28, 2017	Best Cinematography	Darius Khondji	Nominated
San Diego Film Critics Society	December 11, 2017	Best Adapted Screenplay	James Gray	Nominated
San Diego Film Critics Society	December 11, 2017	Best Cinematography	Darius Khondji	Nominated
San Diego Film Critics Society	December 11, 2017	Best Costume Design	Sonia Grande	Nominated
USC Scripter Awards	February 10, 2018	Best Screenplay	James Gray and David Grann	Nominated
