= The White Darkness (Grann book) =

2018 book by David Grann

- First edition cover design
- Author: David Grann
- Language: English
- Subject: Henry Worsley
- Genre: Nonfiction
- Publisher: Doubleday
- Publication date: October 30, 2018
- Publication place: United States
- Media type: Print, e-book
- Pages: 160 pp. (hardcover)
- ISBN: 978-0385544573 (Hardcover)
- Preceded by: Killers of the Flower Moon
- Followed by: The Wager

The White Darkness is the fourth nonfiction book by American journalist David Grann. The book was released on October 30, 2018 by Doubleday. This is a short opus dedicated to the adventures of British explorer Henry Worsley.

== Theme ==
The book centers on the expeditions and adventures by British explorer and British Army officer Henry Worsley, who traveled to the gravesite of Ernest Shackleton, a polar explorer himself. To reach the grave, Worsley traveled to the far shores of South Georgia Island in the southern Atlantic Ocean. In the following years, he traveled even farther.

In 2008, he started his first journey across Antarctica, leading an expedition to pioneer a route through the Transantarctic Mountains, reaching a point 98 miles (157 km) from the South Pole. The expedition commemorated the centenary of Shackleton's Nimrod Expedition. Worsley returned to the Antarctic in 2011, leading a team of six in retracing Roald Amundsen's successful 870-mile (1,400 km) journey in 1912 to the South Pole, marking its centenary. In completing the route, he became the first person to have successfully undertaken the routes taken by Shackleton, Robert Falcon Scott and Amundsen.

In 2015, Worsley decided to start a new expedition. Worsley arrived at the starting point, Berkner Island, on 13 November 2015 with the aim of completing his journey in 80 days. He covered 913 miles (1,469 km) in 69 days, and had only 30 miles (48 km) to go. However, he had to spend days 70 and 71 in his tent, suffering from exhaustion and severe dehydration. Eventually, he radioed for help and was airlifted to Punta Arenas, Chile. He was diagnosed with bacterial peritonitis. On 24 January 2016, he died of organ failure following surgery at the Clinica Magallanes in Punta Arenas. He was 55 years old. Worsley was posthumously awarded the Polar Medal for his exploration of the Antarctic.

== Reception ==
Michael Magras of the Star Tribune noted,

What makes The White Darkness so compelling is Grann’s gift for memorable detail. When, in 2004, Worsley joins an expedition to the South Pole to mark the 100th anniversary of Shackleton’s first attempt, he and his fellow explorers train by tying tractor tires around their waist and dragging them through fields to emulate pulling a heavy sled. And Grann is expert at making readers feel as if they are on the journey with the team.

Julian Glover of the Evening Standard commented,

This is an elegantly packaged book designed to be read as a present on Christmas afternoon, when you are full of wine and turkey and the room is stuffy and the TV dull. Outside it is dark and cold but not as dark or as cold as the world described in this curious book, which will inspire some, just as it frightens others."

David Holahan of the Christian Science Monitor observed, "For all of its page-turning appeal, the book studiously avoids psychological speculation on what compels its subject to repeatedly to place himself in harm’s way. Grann doesn’t openly address the possibility of inner demons, but he drops hints here and there.

== TV limited series ==
In April 2022 Apple TV+ announced that The White Darkness would be developed into a new limited series starring Tom Hiddleston. The series will be developed by Soo Hugh and co-produced by Apple Studios and UCP.
