= Killers of the Flower Moon (book) =

2017 nonfiction book by David Grann

Killers of the Flower Moon: The Osage Murders and the Birth of the FBI
- Author: David Grann
- Language: English
- Subject: Osage Indian murders
- Genre: Nonfiction
- Publisher: Doubleday
- Publication date: April 18, 2017
- Publication place: United States
- Media type: Print, e-book
- Pages: 352 pp. (hardcover)
- ISBN: 978-0-385-53424-6 (Hardcover)
- OCLC: 982488680
- Preceded by: The Devil and Sherlock Holmes
- Followed by: The White Darkness

Killers of the Flower Moon: The Osage Murders and the Birth of the FBI is a 2017 nonfiction book by American journalist David Grann about the Osage murders. Time magazine listed it as one of its top ten nonfiction books of 2017.

The film adaptation Killers of the Flower Moon was directed by Martin Scorsese and released in October 2023.

== Flower Moon origin ==
The Old Farmer's Almanac, which first began publishing the names for the full moons in the 1930s, recorded the name given by American tribes to the full moon in May as the "Flower Moon" because of the flowers blooming across North America, signaling abundance and the coming of spring after a cold, hard winter. The title was originated in the poem "Wi'-gi-e" by Osage poet Elise Paschen, which was written from the perspective of Mollie Kyle. Grann eventually contacted Paschen, and she sent him the poem, an excerpt from which was published in the book.

== Synopsis ==
The book investigates a series of murders of wealthy Osage people that took place in Osage County, Oklahoma, in the early 1920s after extensive oil deposits were discovered beneath their land. After the Osage are awarded headrights in court to the profits from oil deposits found on their land, the Osage people prepare to receive the wealth to which they are legally entitled from sales of their oil deposits.

The Osage are viewed as the "middle man" and a complex plot is hatched to eliminate the Osage inheritors one by one, by any means possible. Officially, the count of the wealthy Osage victims reaches at least 20 but Grann suspects that perhaps hundreds more may have been killed because of their ties to oil. The book details the new FBI's investigation of the murders and the eventual trial and conviction of cattleman William King Hale as the mastermind behind the plot.

== Reception ==
Writing for The New York Times, Dave Eggers called the book "riveting" and wrote, "in these last pages, Grann takes what was already a fascinating and disciplined recording of a forgotten chapter in American history, and with the help of contemporary Osage tribe members, he illuminates a sickening conspiracy that goes far deeper than those four years of horror. It will sear your soul." Dwight Garner, also for the New York Times, stated the work "is close to impeccable".

Sean Woods of Rolling Stone praised Grann's book, noting, "In his masterful new book... Grann chronicles a tale of murder, betrayal, heroism and a nation's struggle to leave its frontier culture behind and enter the modern world... Filled with almost mythic characters from our past – stoic Texas Rangers, corrupt robber barons, private detectives, and murderous desperadoes like the Al Spencer gang – Grann's story amounts to a secret history of the American frontier."

A reviewer of Publishers Weekly stated, "New Yorker staff writer Grann (The Lost City of Z) burnishes his reputation as a brilliant storyteller in this gripping true-crime narrative, which revisits a baffling and frightening—and relatively unknown—spree of murders occurring mostly in Oklahoma during the 1920s."

David Aaronovitch in The Times wrote, "There is a kick-in-the guts half-twist at the end of the book that gives the work its moral heft and reminds the American people of the great cost of their nationhood. It's a twist that owes everything to Grann's diligence and intelligence as a journalist. It could not have been discovered without what he calls his 'research odyssey.'"

=== Oklahoma House Bill 1775 ===
In 2021, the Republican-controlled Oklahoma Legislature passed Oklahoma House Bill 1775, a bill regulating classroom discussion regarding race and gender. After the bill's passage, a teacher in Dewey, Oklahoma canceled her lesson plans involving the book. Lieutenant Governor of Oklahoma Matt Pinnell called on the language in the bill to be "clarified so that teachers know what can be taught and not taught". After the release of the film, author David Grann spoke out against the bill's regulations and wrote an op-ed in The New York Times on the bill.

Hominy Public Schools has taught the book as part of its AP English courses despite HB 1775.

== Film adaptation ==
The book was adapted into a film directed by Martin Scorsese and starring Leonardo DiCaprio, Robert De Niro, Lily Gladstone, John Lithgow, Brendan Fraser, and Jesse Plemons on a budget of over $200 million. It was released theatrically by Paramount Pictures in October 2023. The film is available for streaming on Apple TV+.

Though the role of Tom White, the lead FBI agent, was written for DiCaprio, DiCaprio pushed to have his role changed to Ernest Burkhart, the nephew of Hale, who De Niro played. As a result, Plemons was cast as Tom White to replace DiCaprio.

== See also ==
- The FBI Story
- Mean Spirit
