= James Gray (director) =

American filmmaker

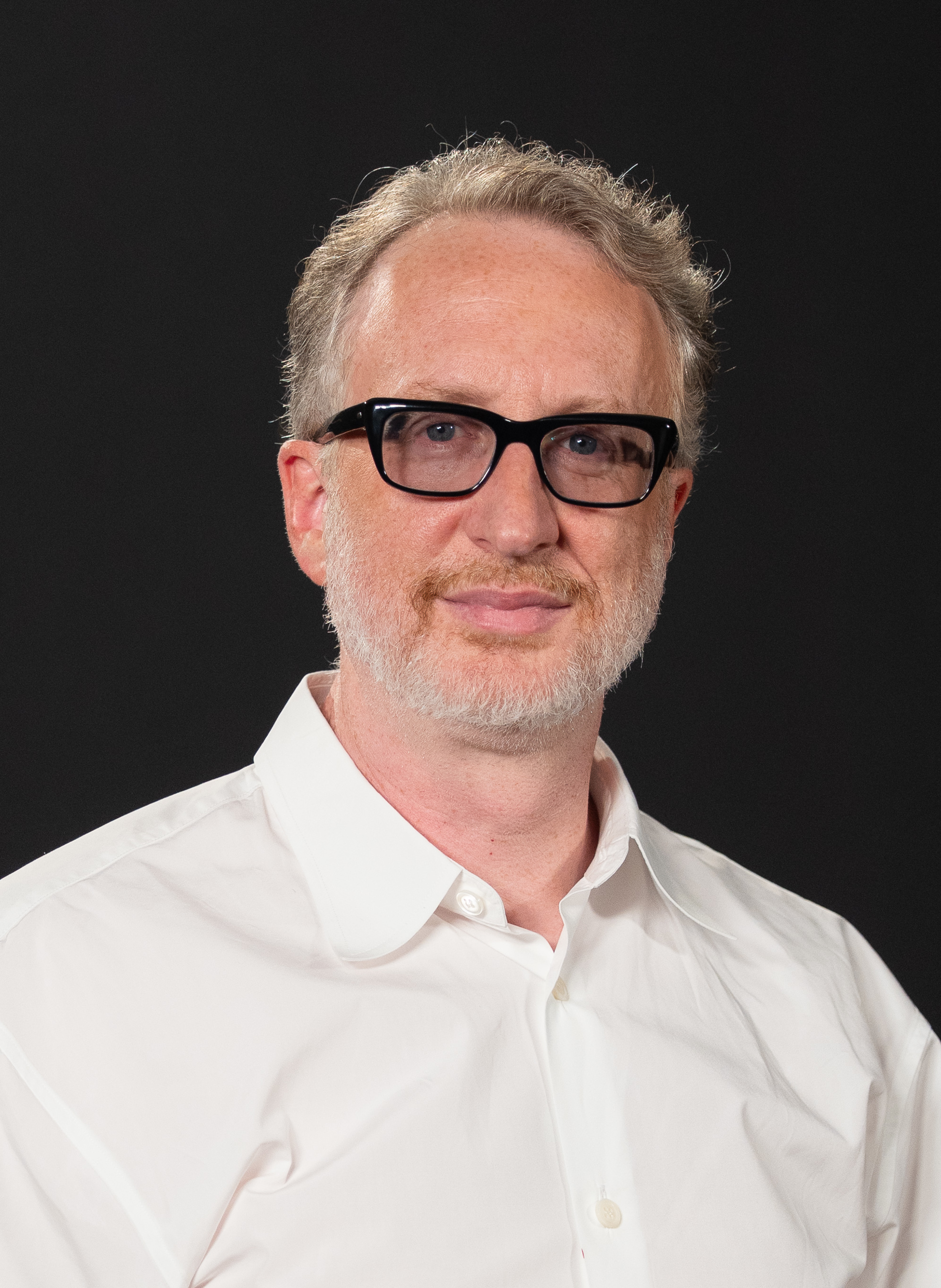
- Gray in 2026
- Born: James Marshall Gray; April 14, 1969 (age 57); New York City, U.S.
- Education: USC School of Cinematic Arts
- Occupations: Film director, screenwriter
- Years active: 1994–present
- Spouse: Alexandra Dickson (m. 2005)
- Children: 3

James Marshall Gray (born April 14, 1969) is an American filmmaker, producer, and screenwriter. Since his feature debut Little Odessa in 1994, he has made eight other features including We Own the Night (2007), Two Lovers (2008), The Immigrant (2013), The Lost City of Z (2016), Ad Astra (2019), Armageddon Time (2022), and Paper Tiger (2026). Six of his films have competed for the Palme d'Or at the Cannes Film Festival.

== Early life ==
Gray was born in New York City and grew up in the neighborhood of Flushing. He is of Russian Jewish descent, with grandparents from Ostropol, Western Ukraine, at that time a part of the USSR. The original family name was "Grayevsky" or "Greyzerstein." His father was once an electronics contractor. Gray attended the USC School of Cinematic Arts, where his student film, Cowboys and Angels, helped him get an agent and the attention of producer Paul Webster, who encouraged him to write a script which he could produce.

== Career ==
=== 1990s ===
In 1994, at age 25, Gray debuted his first feature film Little Odessa, starring Tim Roth as a hit man confronted by his younger brother upon returning to his hometown, "Little Odessa", a section of Brighton Beach, Brooklyn. The film won the Silver Lion at the 51st Venice International Film Festival.

In 1998, Gray began shooting his second film, The Yards, a crime drama set in the commuter rail yards in New York City. The film was released theatrically by Miramax two years later on October 12, 2000.

=== 2000s ===
In March 2006, Gray began production on his third film, We Own the Night, which he had been wanting to shoot since the early 2000s. Set in 1988, it stars Joaquin Phoenix and Mark Wahlberg as two brothers, one a nightclub manager with ties to the Mob and one a police detective who wages an all-out war on drugs. The film screened in competition at the 2007 Cannes Film Festival in May, receiving widely divergent reviews from international critics, and was released theatrically in the U.S. in October.

After that film's success, Gray was given creative freedom for Two Lovers, loosely based on Fyodor Dostoevsky's "White Nights". The film premiered at the 2008 Cannes Film Festival.

=== 2010s ===
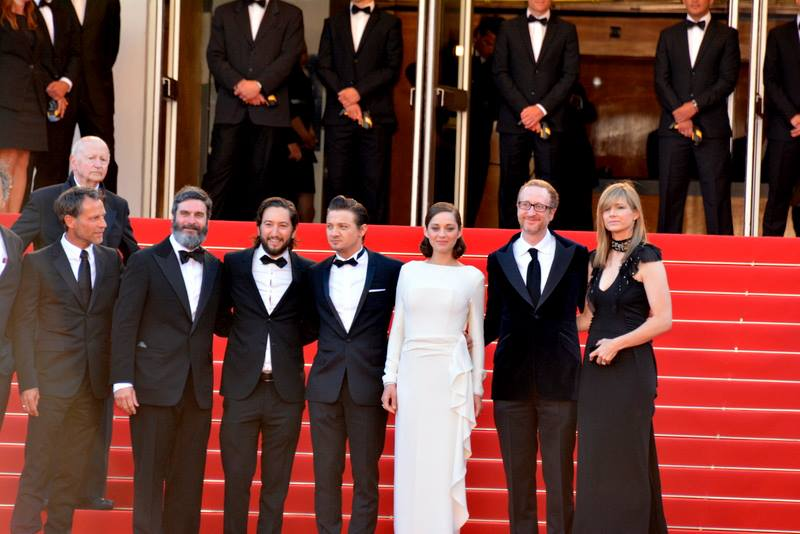
From left: Anthony Katagas, Greg Shapiro, Jeremy Renner, Marion Cotillard, Gray and wife Alexandra Dickson at the 2013 Cannes Film Festival

Gray co-wrote the screenplay for Guillaume Canet's film Blood Ties, a remake of the French thriller Rivals. This collaboration led Gray to meet Canet's partner, Marion Cotillard, whom he cast in his next film, The Immigrant. It tells the story of a Polish nurse who is separated from her sister at Ellis Island and forced into prostitution by a theater manager, played by Joaquin Phoenix. The film, previously titled Lowlife and The Nightingale, was Gray's fourth collaboration with Phoenix. It was nominated for the Palme d'Or at the 2013 Cannes Film Festival.

In 2015, Gray directed a television commercial for Chanel men's fragrance, Bleu de Chanel, starring Gaspard Ulliel. It was filmed in Los Angeles and released on February 5, 2015.

In October 2016, Gray's film The Lost City of Z premiered at the New York Film Festival. The film, based on the book by David Grann, depicts the life of explorer Percy Fawcett, played by Charlie Hunnam.

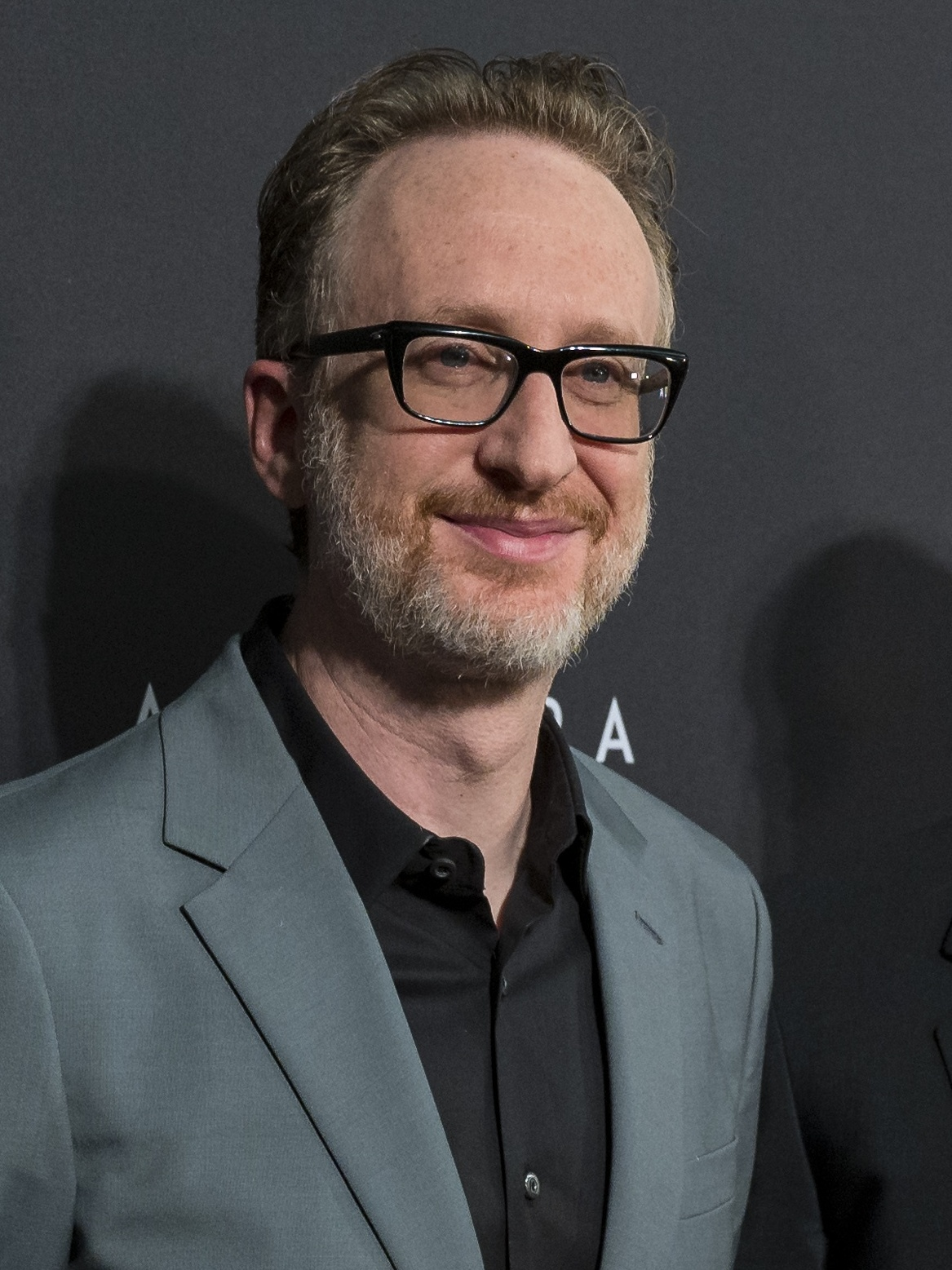
Gray during Ad Astra premiere in 2019

At the 2016 Cannes Film Festival, it was reported that Gray would next direct his long-gestated sci-fi space epic Ad Astra. Brad Pitt signed on to star in April 2017 and the rest of the cast joined later that year. Ad Astra premiered at the Venice Film Festival on August 29, 2019 and was theatrically released in the United States on September 20, 2019 by 20th Century Fox. Gray later said the film released to theaters was not his cut.

=== 2020s ===
On June 16, 2020, it was confirmed that Gray's next film, Armageddon Time, would be a coming-of-age drama loosely based on his childhood memories, with Anne Hathaway, Anthony Hopkins, and Jeremy Strong cast in the film. The film premiered at the Cannes Film Festival on May 19, 2022, and was released in the United States on October 28, 2022 by Focus Features.

In November 2024, it was reported that Gray's next film, Paper Tiger, was a "blue chip crime-drama-thriller" following two brothers who, in pursuit of the American Dream, become "entangled in a scheme that turns out to be too good to be true." Filming commenced in 2025, with financing from Leone Film Group.

=== Unrealized and upcoming projects ===
Gray at the 2026 New York Film Festival

After Little Odessa, Gray was offered the script for The Devil's Own by Brad Pitt, a friend of his. Gray turned it down and the film was directed by Alan J. Pakula. He also passed up the opportunity to direct Good Will Hunting.

In 1997, Gray was in negotiations with producer Art Linson to direct the biopic Killer Spy, about CIA agent Aldrich Ames, based on the novel Betrayal. Kevin Spacey was considered for the starring role of Ames.

In 1999, Gray was in talks to direct Brad Pitt and Jennifer Aniston in Waking Up in Reno for Miramax. The film was made three years later without Gray, Pitt, or Aniston.

It was reported in 2000 that Gray would direct and co-write Edgardo Mortara, a film based on the 1858 kidnapping of the 6-year-old Jewish boy by the Papal police. Gray was to collaborate with writer Rob Eshman on the screenplay.

In 2003, it was rumored that Gray had written an adaptation of Philip K. Dick's novelette "Paycheck". Before John Woo was selected, Brett Ratner was in talks to direct. A film was released later that year, but Gray had no involvement.

In 2006, Gray was planning to direct Alphabet City, based on the 1995 novel by Steven Knight, who also wrote the script's first draft.

In 2010, Gray was hired to rewrite the script of the Charlie Hunnam-scripted Vlad, a period action film based on the story of Vlad the Impaler. Anthony Mandler was attached to direct it.

In January 2011, it was reported that Gray would direct a film adaptation of Mark Greaney's novel The Gray Man by Adam Cozad. The project was first set up at New Regency. Brad Pitt was initially cast to star, but by October 2015, he and Gray were no longer involved with the film.

In April 2011, Jeremy Renner enlisted Gray to write the screenplay for an untitled Steve McQueen biopic, with Renner as McQueen, under his production banner The Combine. "I did it more or less as a favor to Jeremy and to honor Steve McQueen", Gray said. Heavily researched, and based on Portrait of an American Rebel and The Life and Legend of a Hollywood Icon by Marshall Terrill, the film was initially to be directed by Ivan Zachariáš, but Gray said in 2013 that he might direct it himself.

In August 2013, it was announced that Warner Bros. tapped Gray to write and direct White Devil, a film based on the life of John Willis.

It was reported in April 2015 by Variety that Gray was to executive produce and serve as creative consultant on Hard Apple, an "adult-skewing" animated series inspired by Jerome Charyn's Isaac Sidel novels.

In April 2018, MGM closed a deal for Gray to direct I Am Pilgrim, an adaptation of the espionage novel by Terry Hayes. He was slated to direct the film after he finished Ad Astra. In 2022, Gray confirmed that the project is dead, having been lost in the "business mess" with studios changing hands.

In April 2022, Gray announced plans to develop a limited series about novelist Norman Mailer based on J. Michael Lennon's biography Norman Mailer: A Double Life.

In October 2022, Deadline reported that Gray's next film would be a biopic about John F. Kennedy that focused on his time in World War II, when he saved his crew from a sinking patrol boat. The film was titled Mayday 109 and had been in development for several years before Gray boarded the project. Bill Skarsgård was attached to star as Kennedy.

In November 2022, Gray said in an interview that one of his dream projects was an epic about the Russian Revolution called The Dream of a Thousand Men, but that it was unlikely to be made soon, due to Russia's invasion of Ukraine.

In March 2023, it was announced that Gray would direct Ezekiel Moss, a Depression-set ghost story by Keith Bunin, for Focus Features. In 2026, Gray called it a beautiful script but said he could never solve the third act: "I finally declared defeat."

In 2024, Gray was rumored to have replaced Neil Burger as the director of Summer Frost, based on Blake Crouch's source material, which had first been announced in 2020. Zoe Saldana was attached to star in the film. In 2026, Gray acknowledged the rumor, saying, "Summer Frost was something I was attached to some years ago, but it doesn’t seem like that’s going to happen."

In 2025, The Hollywood Reporter announced that Julia Roberts would team with Gray on an adaptation of Peter Swanson's forthcoming Kill Your Darlings, a murder mystery "told in reverse". During a 2026 interview with The Playlist, Gray said Kill Your Darlings was "something I am actively working on", adding: "it's very different from other things I've done, and yet it's exactly the same."

In January 2026, journalist Jeff Sneider reported that Gray was set to adapt The Sun Also Rises, Ernest Hemingway's 1926 novel depicting American and British expatriates struggling with loss and disillusionment in Europe after World War I, with Vanessa Kirby starring. Gray told Deadline that he would likely step away from the autobiographical mode of that film and Armageddon Time and hinted at a return to the kind of "expansiveness" he attempted in The Lost City of Z for his next project. Speaking to The Playlist two months later, Gray said it would cost "$180 million or something" to do the novel justice, but that it "may still happen".

In June 2026, producer-collaborator Rodrigo Teixeira said that he and Gray were developing their fourth film together, an untitled project about the sociopolitical situation in the U.S., to be made in 2027.

Gray turned down the role played by Noah Taylor in Wes Anderson's The Life Aquatic with Steve Zissou. He cameoed in a deleted scene in Love Jones.

=== Opera ===
In 2019, it was reported that Gray was to stage Mozart's The Marriage of Figaro, his first opera, at the Théâtre des Champs-Élysées in Paris that November. French fashion designer Christian Lacroix did the costumes for the production.

== Personal life ==
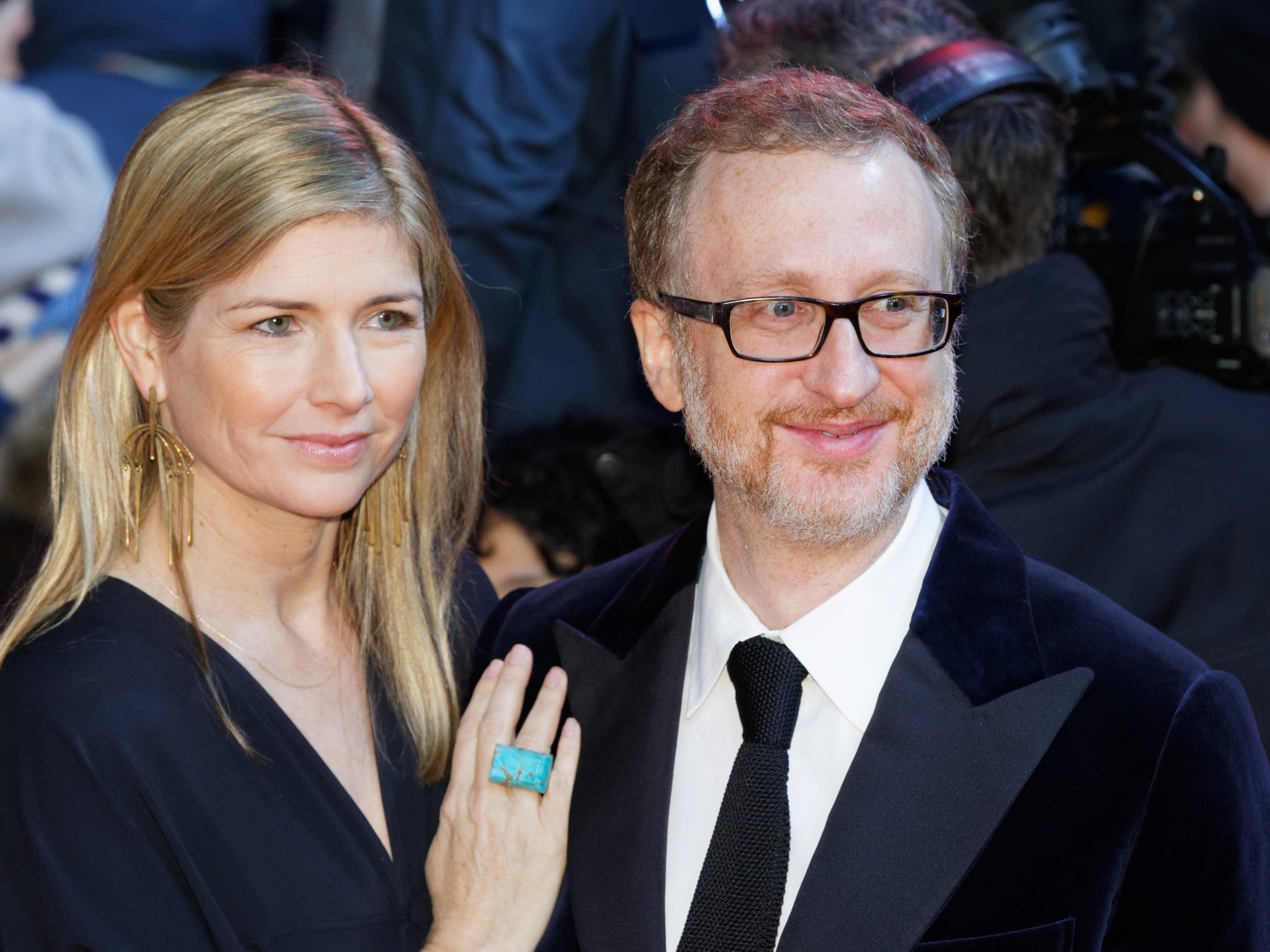
Gray and his wife, Alexandra, in 2017

Gray married Alexandra Dickson in 2005. The couple have three children.

== Favorite films ==
In 2022, Gray participated in the Sight and Sound film polls. Held every ten years to select the greatest films of all time, contemporary directors were asked to select ten films of their choice. Gray chose the following, in no order:

- 2001: A Space Odyssey (USA/UK, 1968)
- Citizen Kane (USA, 1941)
- The Godfather (USA, 1972)
- 8½ (Italy, 1963)
- The Leopard (Italy, 1963)
- Ordet (Denmark, 1955)
- PlayTime (France, 1967)
- Raging Bull (USA, 1980)
- Tokyo Story (Japan, 1953)
- Vertigo (USA, 1958)

== Filmography ==
=== Film ===
Year	Title	Director	Writer	Producer	Notes
1991	Cowboys and Angels	Yes	No	No	Student short film
1994	Little Odessa	Yes	Yes	No	
2000	The Yards	Yes	Yes	No	Co-written with Matt Reeves
2007	We Own the Night	Yes	Yes	No	
2008	Two Lovers	Yes	Yes	Yes	Co-written with Richard Menello
2013	Blood Ties	No	Yes	Executive	Co-written with Guillaume Canet
2013	The Immigrant	Yes	Yes	Yes	Co-written with Richard Menello
2016	The Lost City of Z	Yes	Yes	Yes	Based on the book by David Grann
2019	Ad Astra	Yes	Yes	Yes	Co-written with Ethan Gross
2022	Armageddon Time	Yes	Yes	Yes	
2026	Paper Tiger	Yes	Yes	Yes	

=== Television ===
Year	Title	Episode
2014	The Red Road	"Arise My Love, Shake Off This Dream"

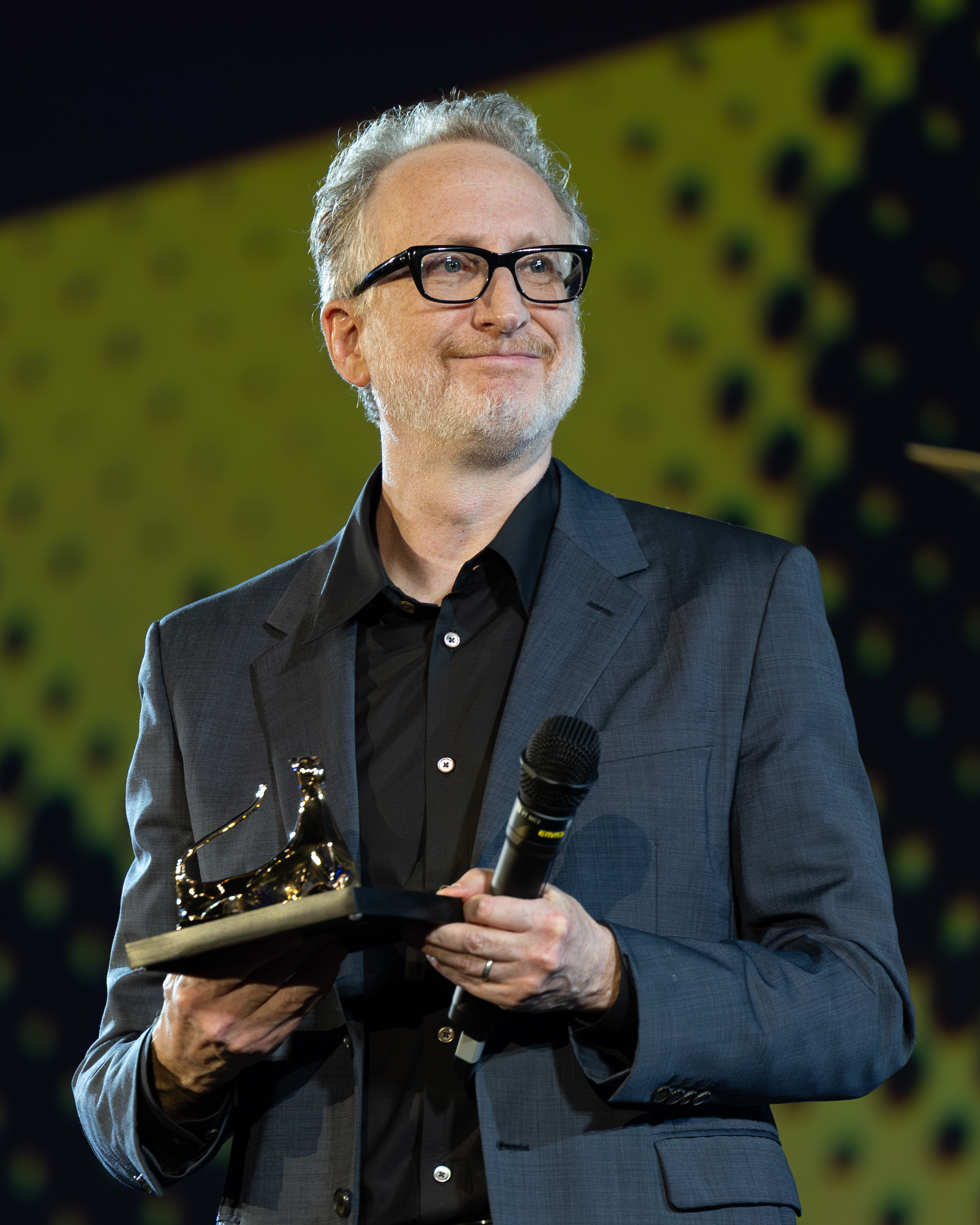
Gray with his Pardo alla Carriera award at the 79th Locarno Film Festival

== Accolades ==
Year	Award	Category	Title	Result
2000	Cannes Film Festival	Palme d'Or	The Yards	Nominated
2007	Cannes Film Festival	Palme d'Or	We Own the Night	Nominated
2008	Cannes Film Festival	Palme d'Or	Two Lovers	Nominated
2013	Cannes Film Festival	Palme d'Or	The Immigrant	Nominated
2022	Cannes Film Festival	Palme d'Or	Armageddon Time	Nominated
2026	Cannes Film Festival	Palme d'Or	Paper Tiger	Nominated
2008	César Awards	Best Foreign Film	We Own the Night	Nominated
2009	César Awards	Best Foreign Film	Two Lovers	Nominated
2026	Gotham Awards	Best Feature	Paper Tiger	Pending
1996	Independent Spirit Awards	Best First Feature	Little Odessa	Nominated
1996	Independent Spirit Awards	Best First Screenplay	Little Odessa	Nominated
2010	Independent Spirit Awards	Best Director	Two Lovers	Nominated
1994	Venice International Film Festival	Golden Lion	Little Odessa	Nominated
1994	Venice International Film Festival	Silver Lion	Little Odessa	Won
2019	Venice International Film Festival	Golden Lion	Ad Astra	Nominated
