= David Grann =

American journalist (born 1967)

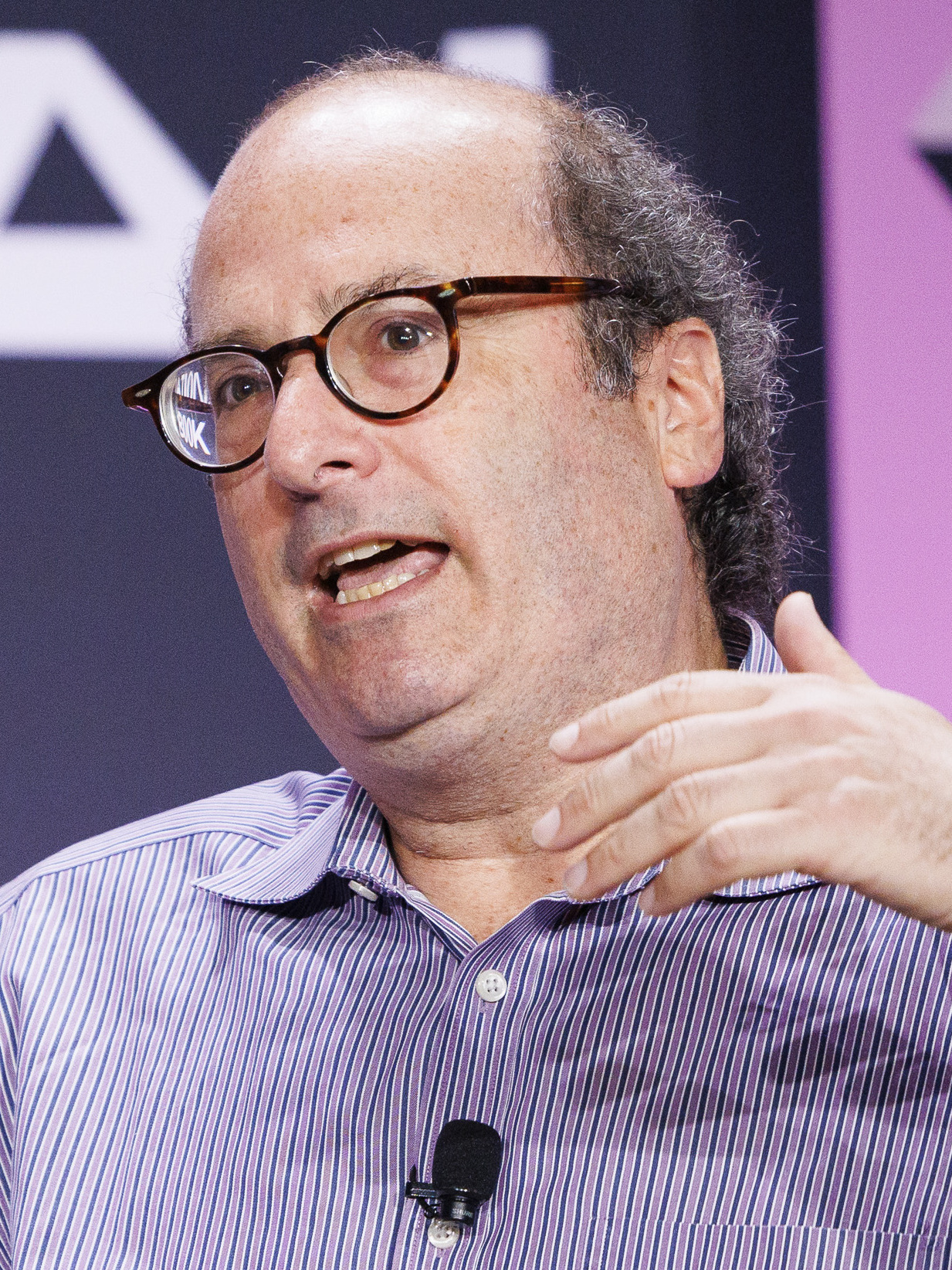
- Grann at the 2023 National Book Festival
- Born: David Elliot Grann; March 10, 1968 (age 58); Sutton, England, UK
- Education: Connecticut College (BA); Tufts University (MA); Boston University (MFA)
- Occupations: Staff writer, and book writer
- Spouse: Kyra Darnton (m. 2000)
- Children: 2
- Writing career
- Notable works: The Lost City of Z The Devil and Sherlock Holmes; Killers of the Flower Moon; The White Darkness; The Wager
- Notable awards: Thomas J. Watson Fellowship; George Polk Awards
- Website: davidgrann.com

David Elliot Grann (born March 10, 1968) is an American journalist, a staff writer for The New Yorker, and author.

His first book, The Lost City of Z: A Tale of Deadly Obsession in the Amazon, was published by Doubleday in February 2009. After its first week of publication, it debuted on The New York Times bestseller list at No. 4 and later reached No. 1. Grann's articles have been collected in several anthologies, including What We Saw: The Events of September 11, 2001, The Best American Crime Writing of 2004 and 2005, and The Best American Sports Writing of 2003 and 2006. He has written for The New York Times Magazine, The Atlantic, The Washington Post, The Wall Street Journal, and The Weekly Standard.

According to a profile in Slate, Grann has a reputation as a "workhorse reporter", which has made him a popular journalist who "inspires a devotion in readers that can border on the obsessive."

== Early life ==
Grann was born on March 10, 1968, to publishing executive Phyllis E. Grann and oncologist Victor Grann. Grann has two siblings, Edward and Alison.

== Career ==
He graduated from Connecticut College in 1989 with a B.A. in Government. While still in college, Grann received a Thomas J. Watson Fellowship and conducted research in Mexico, where he began his career as a freelance journalist.

He received a master's degree in international relations from the Fletcher School of Law and Diplomacy at Tufts University in 1993. At that point primarily interested in fiction, Grann hoped to develop a career as a novelist.

In 1994 he was hired as a copy editor at The Hill, a Washington, D.C.–based newspaper covering the United States Congress. The same year, Grann earned a master's degree in creative writing from Boston University, where he taught courses in creative writing and fiction. He was named The Hill's executive editor in 1995. In 1996, Grann became a senior editor at The New Republic. He joined The New Yorker in 2003 as a staff writer. He was a finalist for the Michael Kelly Award in 2005.

In 2009, he received both the George Polk Award and Sigma Delta Chi Award for his New Yorker piece "Trial By Fire", about Cameron Todd Willingham. Another New Yorker investigative article, "The Mark of a Masterpiece", raised questions about the methods of Peter Paul Biro, who claimed to use fingerprints to help authenticate lost masterpieces. Biro sued Grann and The New Yorker for libel, but the case was summarily dismissed. The article was a finalist for the 2010 National Magazine Award.

=== The Lost City of Z ===
External videos
- Presentation by Grann on The Lost City of Z, February 24, 2009, C-SPAN

Grann's 2009 non-fiction book The Lost City of Z: A Tale of Deadly Obsession in the Amazon recounts the odyssey of the notable British explorer, Captain Percy Fawcett who, in 1925, disappeared with his son in the Amazon while looking for the Lost City of Z. For decades, explorers and scientists have tried to find evidence of both his party and the Lost City of Z. Grann also trekked into the Amazon. In his book, he reveals new evidence about how Fawcett died and shows that "Z" may have existed.

=== Killers of the Flower Moon ===
External videos
- Presentation by Grann on Killers of the Flower Moon, May 9, 2017, C-SPAN

In March 2014, Grann said he was working on a new book about the Osage Indian murders, considered "one of the most sinister crimes in American history." His book Killers of the Flower Moon: An American Crime and the Birth of the FBI was published in 2017, chronicling "a tale of murder, betrayal, heroism and a nation's struggle to leave its frontier culture behind and enter the modern world." It was a finalist for the 2013 National Book Award and later became #1 on The New York Times bestseller list. The film adaptation, Killers of the Flower Moon, was directed by Martin Scorsese and released in October 2023.

=== The Wager: A Tale of Shipwreck, Mutiny and Murder ===
External videos
- Presentation by Grann on The Wager, May 1, 2023, C-SPAN

The Wager: A Tale of Shipwreck, Mutiny and Murder, was published in April 2025. It debuted at #1 on The New York Times bestseller list and the hardcover stayed on the list for 65 weeks. A reviewer in The Guardian wrote, “The Wager is one of the finest nonfiction books I've ever read. I can only offer the highest praise a writer can give: endless envy, as deep and salty as the sea." Former President Barack Obama selected The Wager as one of his summer reading books, a popular booklist he shares annually.

=== Other books ===
External videos
- Presentation by Grann on The White Darkness, August 31, 2019, C-SPAN

A collection of twelve previously published Grann essays, The Devil and Sherlock Holmes: Tales of Murder, Madness, and Obsession, was published in March 2012.

Another book, The White Darkness, was published in October 2017.

== Personal life ==
Grann married Kyra Darnton in 2000. They have two children, and as of 2016 resided in New York.

== Bibliography ==
=== Articles ===
Collections:

- The Devil and Sherlock Holmes: Tales of Murder, Madness, and Obsession. Doubleday. 2010. ISBN 9780385517928.. Collection of 8 articles:
  - "Mysterious Circumstances: The strange death of a Sherlock Holmes fanatic". The New Yorker. December 13, 2004.
  - "Trial by Fire: Did Texas execute an innocent man?". The New Yorker. September 7, 2009.
  - "The Chameleon: The many lives of Frédéric Bourdin". The New Yorker. August 11–18, 2008.
  - "True Crime: A postmodern murder mystery". The New Yorker. February 11–18, 2008.
  - "Which Way Did He Run?". The New York Times Magazine. January 13, 2002.
  - "The Squid Hunter: Can Steve O'Shea capture the sea's most elusive creature". The New Yorker. May 24, 2004.
  - "City of Water: Can an intricate and antiquated maze of tunnels continue to sustain New York?". The New Yorker. September 1, 2003.
  - "The Old Man and the Gun: Forrest Tucker had a long career robbing banks, and he wasn't willing to retire". The New Yorker. January 27, 2003.
  - "Stealing Time: What makes Rickey Henderson run?". The New Yorker. September 12, 2005.
  - "The Brand: How the Aryan Brotherhood became the most murderous prison gang in America". The New Yorker. February 16–23, 2004.
  - "Crimetown USA: The city that fell in love with the mob". The New Republic. July 10, 2000.
  - "Giving "The Devil" His Due". The Atlantic. June 2001.
- The Old Man and the Gun: And Other Tales of True Crime. Doubleday. 2018. ISBN 9780525566038.. Collection of 3 articles:
  "The Old Man and the Gun: Forrest Tucker had a long career robbing banks, and he wasn't willing to retire", "True Crime: A postmodern murder mystery", "The Chameleon: The many lives of Frédéric Bourdin"

=== Books ===
- The Lost City of Z: A Tale of Deadly Obsession in the Amazon. Doubleday. 2009. ISBN 9780385513531. His article "The Lost City of Z: A quest to uncover the secrets of the Amazon" is about the same subject.
- Killers of the Flower Moon: The Osage Murders and the Birth of the FBI. Doubleday. 2017. ISBN 9780385534246. His article "The Marked Woman: How an Osage Indian family became the prime target of one of the most sinister crimes in American history" is about the same subject.
- The White Darkness. Doubleday. 2018. ISBN 9780385544573. Based on his article "The White Darkness".
- The Wager: A Tale of Shipwreck, Mutiny and Murder. Doubleday. 2023. ISBN 9780385534260.

== Adaptations ==
- The Lost City of Z (2016), film directed by James Gray, based on book The Lost City of Z: A Tale of Deadly Obsession in the Amazon
- Dark Crimes (2016) The film was based on a 2008 article in The New Yorker titled "True Crime: A Postmodern Murder Mystery."
- The Old Man & the Gun (2018), film directed by David Lowery, based on article "The Old Man and the Gun: Forrest Tucker had a long career robbing banks, and he wasn't willing to retire"
- Trial by Fire (2018), film directed by Edward Zwick, based on article "Trial by Fire: Did Texas execute an innocent man?"
- Killers of the Flower Moon (2023), film directed by Martin Scorsese, based on book Killers of the Flower Moon: The Osage Murders and the Birth of the FBI

Forthcoming:

- The White Darkness:
  Apple TV+ announced in April 2022 that Grann's book The White Darkness would be developed into a new limited series starring Tom Hiddleston. The series will be developed by Soo Hugh and co-produced by Apple Studios and UCP.
- The Wager:
  In July 2022, Scorsese and DiCaprio also acquired the rights to Grann's 2023 non-fiction book, The Wager: A Tale of Shipwreck, Mutiny and Murder.

== Awards ==
- 1989 Thomas J. Watson Fellowship
- 2005 (finalist) Michael Kelly award
- 2009 George Polk Awards
- 2009 Sigma Delta Chi Award
- 2009 (shortlist) Samuel Johnson Prize
- 2010 (finalist) National Magazine Awards
- 2013 Cullman Fellowship
- 2024 (finalist) National Book AwardReferences
