= The Lost City of Z (book) =

2009 book by David Grann

The Lost City of Z: A Tale of Deadly Obsession in the Amazon
- Cover of the first US edition
- Author: David Grann
- Language: English
- Subject: Percy Fawcett
- Genre: Nonfiction
- Publisher: Doubleday
- Publication date: February 2009
- Publication place: United States
- Media type: Print; e-book
- Pages: 352
- ISBN: 978-0-385-51353-1
- OCLC: 226038067
- Dewey Decimal: 918.1/1046 22
- LC Class: F2546 .G747 2009

The Lost City of Z: A Tale of Deadly Obsession in the Amazon is a nonfiction book by American author David Grann. Published in 2009, the book recounts the activities of the British explorer Percy Fawcett who, in 1925, disappeared with his son in the Amazon rainforest while looking for the ancient "Lost City of Z". In the book, Grann recounts his own journey into the Amazon, by which he discovered new evidence about how Fawcett may have died.

The Lost City of Z was the basis of a 2016 feature film of the same name.

== Overview ==
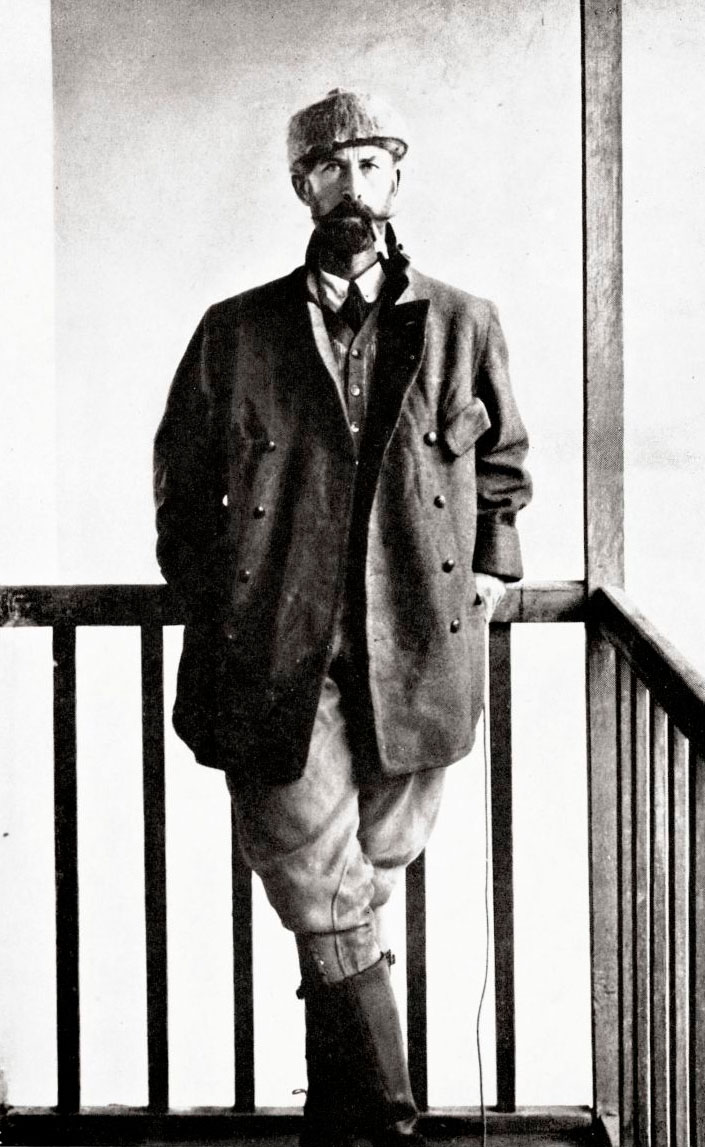
Percy Fawcett in 1911

As observed by Kirkus Reviews, "Fawcett's exploits in jungles and atop mountains inspired novels such as Arthur Conan Doyle's The Lost World, and his character is the tutelary spirit of the Indiana Jones franchise. Fawcett in turn was nurtured by his associations with fabulists such as Doyle and H. Rider Haggard, whose talisman he bore into the Amazonian rainforest."

For decades explorers and scientists have tried to find evidence of Fawcett's party and of the Lost City of Z. Of those, Grann explains, "there are no reliable statistics on the numbers who died. One recent estimate, however, put the total as high as a hundred." (A more historically accurate toll, according to historian John Hemming, is one.)

Grann, a New Yorker magazine staff writer, first wrote about the story in The New Yorker in 2005. The article documents how Grann, working from Fawcett's long-lost diaries, reconstructed the explorer's last journey, including visiting members of the Kalapalo tribe in the Xingu Indigenous Park region of the state of Mato Grosso, Brazil. The Kalapalo had apparently preserved an oral history about Fawcett's small party of himself, his son Jack, and Jack's friend Raleigh Rimell, who were among the first Europeans the tribe had ever seen.

The oral account said that Fawcett and his party had stayed at their village and, despite warnings about "fierce Indians" who occupied that territory, had headed eastward. The Kalapalos observed smoke from Fawcett's expedition's campfire each evening for five days before it disappeared. As a result, the Kalapalos said they were sure that the fierce Indians had killed them. The article formed the basis for Grann's book.

As a result of Grann's own trek into the Amazon and consultations with archeologists, he also learned that Fawcett may have come upon "Z" without knowing it. Grann reported on excavations by the archeologist Michael Heckenberger at a site in the Amazon Xingu region that might be the long-rumored lost city. The ruins were surrounded by several concentric circular moats, with evidence of palisades that had been described in the folklore and oral history of nearby tribes. Heckenberger also found evidence of wooden structures and roads that cut through the jungle. Black Indian earth showed evidence that humans had added supplements to the soil to increase its fertility to support agriculture.

The settlements and civilization of these people appeared to have lasted long enough for them to have had contact with Europeans. Many died due to new infectious diseases, which may have been carried by some of their usual indigenous trading partners, rather than directly by Europeans. The high rate of fatality of these epidemics disrupted the people and their society: in only a few years, they were so devastated by disease that they had virtually died out.

The earliest conquistadors left records of their glimpses of this civilization, but by the time they tried to explore the rainforest again, the indigenous people were all but gone. The jungle was quickly reclaiming the land.

== Reception ==
The Lost City of Z was reviewed by Rich Cohen in the Sunday New York Times Book Review, who said it was "a powerful narrative, stiff-lipped and Victorian at the center, trippy at the edges, as if one of those stern men of Conrad had found himself trapped in a novel by García Márquez." The Washington Post described it as "a thrill ride from start to finish."

Critic Michiko Kakutani ranked it as one of the ten best books of 2009. In her review, Kakutani wrote that it:

is at once a biography, a detective story and a wonderfully vivid piece of travel writing that combines Bruce Chatwinesque powers of observation with a Waugh-like sense of the absurd. Mr. Grann treats us to a harrowing reconstruction of Fawcett’s forays into the Amazonian jungle, as well as an evocative rendering of the vanished age of exploration. . . . Suspenseful. . . Rollicking . . . Fascinating . . . It reads with all the pace and excitement of a movie thriller and all the verisimilitude and detail of firsthand reportage.

Writing for The Wall Street Journal, Simon Winchester said the book was "captivating" but faulted Grann for not having more doubts about the ruins of “Z” being an ancient city. After the movie adaptation, John Hemming, an explorer and expert on the indigenous peoples of the Amazon, dismissed much of the movie’s source material—and Fawcett’s importance—as hyperbolic in a piece for The Times Literary Supplement, concluding that Fawcett was an "unimportant, disagreeable and ultimately pathetic man."

The book appeared on several "best" and "notable books of the year" lists, including that of Entertainment Weekly, The Washington Post, The Boston Globe, Publishers Weekly, Sunday New York Times, The Christian Science Monitor, Bloomberg, the Providence Journal, The Globe and Mail, Evening Standard, Amazon, and McClatchy Newspapers. Barnes & Noble ranked The Lost City of Z as the single best nonfiction book of 2009.

== Awards and honors ==
- New York Times bestseller (Nonfiction, 2009)
- Samuel Johnson Prize, shortlist (2009)
- Amazon's Best Books of the Year (#58, 2009)
- Publishers Weekly’s Top 10 Best Books: 2009
- Publishers Weekly's Best Books: 2009
- New York Times Notable Book of the Year (Nonfiction, 2009)
- ALA Notable Books for Adults (2010)
- Indies Choice Book Award (Adult Non-fiction, 2010)
- Globe and Mail Best Book (Travel 2009)
- The Essential Man's Library: 50 Non-Fiction Adventure Books
- Christian Science Monitor Best Book (Nonfiction, 2009)

== Film adaptation ==
The Lost City of Z was optioned by Brad Pitt’s Plan B production company and Paramount Pictures in 2010. The adaptation, directed by James Gray, who also wrote the screenplay, premiered on October 15, 2016, at the 54th New York Film Festival. The film stars Charlie Hunnam as Percy Fawcett, Sienna Miller as Fawcett's wife, Tom Holland as Jack Fawcett and Robert Pattinson as Henry Costin.

== Editions ==
- Grann, David (2009). The Lost City of Z: A Tale of Deadly Obsession in the Amazon. Doubleday. ISBN 978-0-385-51353-1. A paperback edition was released in January 2010.
- As of this date, The Lost City of Z has been translated into more than 25 languages.

== See also ==
- Brazilian Adventure (1933), by Peter Fleming, travel literature about a search for Fawcett
- Road to Zanzibar (1941), movie loosely based on the search for Fawcett
- Indiana Jones and the Seven Veils (1991), Indiana Jones novel with a plot to find Fawcett
