= Ben Younger =

American screenwriter and film director (born 1972)

- Born: October 7, 1972 (age 53); New York, New York, U.S.
- Occupation: Filmmaker
- Years active: 1995–present

Ben Younger (born October 7, 1972) is an American screenwriter and film director. He wrote and directed the feature films Boiler Room (2000), Prime (2005), and Bleed for This (2016).

== Early life and education ==
Younger was born in Brooklyn and raised in a Modern Orthodox Jewish household in Eltingville, Staten Island and in Fair Lawn, New Jersey. He attended a yeshiva, before entering Queens College, part of the City University of New York, where he studied political science. While at university, he started performing comedy.

== Career ==
After leaving university, he set his sights on a career in politics, taking on a role as a policy analyst for the New York City comptroller's office, where he served as a legislative aide to Alan Hevesi. After that, he successfully managed the State Assembly campaign for Queens Democrat Melinda Katz, becoming, at 21, the city's youngest ever campaign manager.

He wrote and directed a short film, L & M, as well as working on a number of feature films as a grip, and directing music videos and commercials.

=== Boiler Room ===
In 1995, he attended an interview for a job in a brokerage firm, and immediately conceived the idea that went on to become his first film, Boiler Room. He spent two years researching the underground telemarketing brokerage industry as background for his screenplay. Boiler Room was released in 2000. A corporate drama in the mold of Wall Street and Glengarry Glen Ross, with colorful dialogue that some critics compared to David Mamet, the film exposed the shady world of "chop shops" (underground brokerage firms), and starred Giovanni Ribisi, Vin Diesel, Nicky Katt, Jamie Kennedy, and Ben Affleck.

=== Prime ===
Younger's second film, Prime (2005), is a romantic comedy about the relationship between a young Jewish man and an older gentile woman. The film stars Uma Thurman and Meryl Streep. The movie was prominently featured in the HBO show Unscripted because Bryan Greenberg, star of Unscripted was also the male lead in Prime. Younger appeared as himself in the episodes where the movie was featured.

=== Bleed for This ===
Younger's third film Bleed for This is an American biographical drama based on the life of former World Champion Boxer Vinny Pazienza. Younger both wrote and directed. The film stars Miles Teller, Katey Sagal, Amanda Clayton, and Aaron Eckhart, and is executive produced by Martin Scorsese. The film was released on November 18, 2016.

== Filmography ==
=== Short film ===
Year	Title	Director	Producer
1998	Maestro	No	Yes
2001	The Car Thief and the Hit Man	Yes	No
2001	The Investigator and the Man in the Tan Jacket	Yes	No
2001	The Hit Man and the Investigator	Yes	No
2004	Toothpaste	Yes	No
2015	Share	No	Associate

=== Feature film ===
Year	Title	Director	Writer	Producer	Notes
2000	Boiler Room	Yes	Yes	No	
2005	Prime	Yes	Yes	No	
2016	Bleed for This	Yes	Yes	Yes	
TBA	Left Seat	Yes	Yes	Yes	

=== Television ===
Year	Title	Director	Executive producer
2007	Army Wives	Yes (1)	No
2019–23	Snowfall	Yes (6)	Consulting
2023	The Company You Keep	Yes (1)	Yes
2024	The Vince Staples Show	Yes (2)	No
2026	The Drop: A Snowfall Saga	Yes (1)	Yes

== Awards and nominations ==
Year	Award	Result	Category	Film
2000	Deauville American Film Festival	Nominated	Grand Special Prize	Boiler Room
2000	Deauville American Film Festival	Won	Jury Special Prize	Boiler Room (Tied with Memento)
2001	Independent Spirit Award	Nominated	Best First Screenplay	Boiler Room
2001	Independent Spirit Award	Nominated	Best First Feature	Boiler Room (Shared with Jennifer Todd and Suzanne Todd)
