= If These Walls Could Talk =

- DVD cover
- Genre: Drama; Thriller
- Written by: Susan Nanus; I. Marlene King; Nancy Savoca; Earl W. Wallace; Pamela Wallace
- Directed by: Nancy Savoca; Cher
- Starring: Demi Moore; Sissy Spacek; Cher; Xander Berkeley; Hedy Burress; Anne Heche; Jada Pinkett; Shirley Knight
- Composer: Cliff Eidelman
- Country of origin: United States
- Original language: English

Production
- Executive producers: Cher; Demi Moore; Suzanne Todd
- Producers: Martin Ganz; Doris Kirch; Laura Greenlee
- Cinematography: Ellen Kuras; Bobby Bukowski; John Stanier
- Editors: Peter Honess; Elena Maganini
- Running time: 97 minutes
- Production companies: HBO NYC Productions; Moving Pictures

Original release
- Network: HBO
- Release: October 13, 1996

Related
- If These Walls Could Talk 2

If These Walls Could Talk is a 1996 American anthology television film, broadcast on HBO. It follows the plights of three women and their experiences with abortion. Starring Anne Heche, Cher, Demi Moore, and Sissy Spacek, each of the three stories takes place in the same house, albeit 44 years apart (in 1952, 1974, and 1996, respectively). All three segments were co-written by Nancy Savoca, who directed the first and second segments; Cher directed the third segment, and was an executive producer, along with Moore and Suzanne Todd. The women's experiences in each vignette are designed to portray the popular views of society on abortion during each of the respective decades shown.

Debuting at the Toronto International Film Festival, If These Walls Could Talk became a surprise success, becoming the highest-rated movie in HBO history. It was nominated for four Primetime Emmy Awards, including Outstanding Television Movie, and three Golden Globe Awards, including Best Miniseries or Television Film.

== Plot ==
=== 1952 ===
The 1952 segment deals with Claire Donnelly, a widowed nurse living in suburban Chicago, who becomes pregnant by Kevin, her brother-in-law; she decides to undergo an abortion, in order not to hurt her late husband's family. However, at the time, the procedure is strictly illegal. She eventually finds another nurse, who provides Claire with the phone number of a woman who can locate "someone" to perform an abortion. The woman on the phone tells Claire that the only trustworthy care provider she knows is located in Puerto Rico, and Claire cannot afford the travel costs—with air fare and hotel costs, the total trip would have cost about $1,000 (about $11,844 in 2024). After a failed attempt to self-terminate the pregnancy with a knitting needle, Claire contacts a man who comes to her home and performs a clandestine, hasty procedure as she lies atop her kitchen table. Claire finally manages to abort the fetus, but suffers massive blood loss after the man leaves, and passes out as she calls the hospital.

=== 1974 ===
This segment deals with Barbara Barrows, a struggling, aging mother-of-four, and her night-shift-working, policeman husband, who discovers she is pregnant, while having recently gone back to college. She considers abortion with the support of her teenage daughter, Linda, but ultimately chooses to keep the child. Barbara and her husband are frightened by their economic prospect and the future, but they promise each other to try their best so that their new son can have a normal life.

=== 1996 ===
The 1996 segment deals with Christine Cullen, a college student impregnated by a married professor, who decides on an abortion when he breaks up with her and only offers her money. After consulting with her roommate, Patti, Christine schedules an appointment with Dr. Beth Thompson. However, on the day of the procedure, there is a violent anti-abortion protest outside the clinic; just after the actual abortion has been successfully completed, an enraged and unhinged protester abruptly storms in the building, shoots Thompson, and flees. Christine finds herself alone, and screams for help as Thompson bleeds out.

== Cast ==
1952 segment

- Demi Moore as Claire Donnelly
- Shirley Knight as Mary Donnelly
- Robin Gammell as Jim Donnelly
- Catherine Keener as Becky Donnelly
- Jason London as Kevin Donnelly
- CCH Pounder as Jenny Ford
- Phyllis Lyons as Audrey
- Aaron Lustig as Tom
- Kevin Cooney as Dr. Kramer
- Lorna Scott as Louise
- Tim DeKay as Becky's husband

1974 segment

- Sissy Spacek as Barbara Barrows
- Xander Berkeley as John Barrows
- Hedy Burress as Linda Barrows
- Joanna Gleason as Julia
- Harris Yulin as Professor Speras
- Janna Michaels as Sally Barrows
- Ian Bohen as Scott Barrows
- Zack Eginton as Ryan Barrows
- Jordana Spiro as Alison

1996 segment

- Cher as Dr. Beth Thompson
- Anne Heche as Christine Cullen
- Jada Pinkett as Patti
- Eileen Brennan as Tessie
- Lindsay Crouse as Frances White
- Craig T. Nelson as Jim Harris
- Diana Scarwid as Marcia Schulman
- Lorraine Toussaint as Shameeka Webb
- Rita Wilson as Leslie
- Matthew Lillard as protester
- Sally Murphy as Doreen

== Development ==
As executive producer, Moore spent seven years trying to get the film made, until the project was eventually greenlit by HBO. HBO vice president Colin Callender said: "I don't believe there's a studio in the world that would finance this picture", and praised Moore and Cher for having the courage to use their celebrity to address the issue of abortion. Cher commented that "It took someone with Demi's power and fortitude to have something like this made. Without that power, you couldn't do it. These topics are not on everybody's top 10 list of things to do."

== Reception ==
The film received mostly positive reviews from critics. If These Walls Could Talk holds an 88% rating on Rotten Tomatoes based on eight reviews.

Among the positive reviews were Siskel & Ebert, who both gave the film "Two Thumbs Up."

== Awards and nominations ==
Year	Award	Category	Nominee(s)	Result	Ref.
1997	CableACE Awards	Editing a Dramatic Special or Series/Movie or Miniseries	Peter Honess and Elena Maganini	Won	
1997	Festival International de Programmes Audiovisuels	Fiction		Won	
1997	Golden Globe Awards	Best Miniseries or Motion Picture Made for Television		Nominated	
1997	Golden Globe Awards	Best Actress in a Miniseries or Motion Picture Made for Television	Demi Moore	Nominated	
1997	Golden Globe Awards	Best Supporting Actress in a Miniseries or Motion Picture Made for Television	Cher	Nominated	
1997	NAACP Image Awards	Outstanding Lead Actress in a Television Movie or Mini-Series	Jada Pinkett	Nominated	
1997	Online Film & Television Association Awards	Best Motion Picture Made for Television		Nominated	
1997	Online Film & Television Association Awards	Best Direction of a Motion Picture or Miniseries		Nominated	
1997	Online Film & Television Association Awards	Best Writing of a Motion Picture or Miniseries		Nominated	
1997	Online Film & Television Association Awards	Best Editing in a Motion Picture or Limited Series		Nominated	
1997	Primetime Emmy Awards	Outstanding Made for Television Movie	Suzanne Todd, Demi Moore, Laura Greenlee, and J.J. Klein	Nominated	
1997	Primetime Emmy Awards	Outstanding Editing for a Miniseries or a Special – Single Camera Production	Elena Maganini (for "1952" and "1974")	Nominated	
1997	Primetime Emmy Awards	Outstanding Hairstyling for a Miniseries or a Special	Clare M. Corsick, Enzo Angileri, Sally J. Harper, Renate Leuschner, Voni Hinkle, Serena Radaelli, and Cammy R. Langer	Nominated	
1997	Primetime Emmy Awards	The President's Award	HBO Films and Anasazi Productions	Nominated	
1997	Satellite Awards	Best Motion Picture Made for Television		Nominated	
1997	Satellite Awards	Best Actress in a Supporting Role in a Mini-Series or Motion Picture Made for Television	Cher	Nominated	
1997	YoungStar Awards	Best Young Actress in a Made-for-TV Film	Hedy Burress	Nominated	
2000	Women in Film Crystal + Lucy Awards	Lucy Award (Note: To the Creators and Cast of If These Walls Could Talk and If These Walls Could Talk 2. In recognition of excellence and innovation in a creative work that has enhanced the perception of women through the medium of television.)		Won	
2019	Online Film & Television Association Awards	Television Hall of Fame: Productions		Inducted	

== Sequel ==
A sequel anthology, If These Walls Could Talk 2, aired in 2000. However, the subject addressed in the sequel anthology is lesbianism.
