= Boiler Room (film) =

- Theatrical release poster
- Directed by: Ben Younger
- Written by: Ben Younger
- Produced by: Jennifer Todd; Suzanne Todd
- Starring: Giovanni Ribisi; Vin Diesel; Nia Long; Nicky Katt; Scott Caan; Ben Affleck
- Cinematography: Enrique Chediak
- Edited by: Chris Peppe
- Music by: The Angel
- Production company: Team Todd
- Distributed by: New Line Cinema
- Release dates: January 28, 2000 (Sundance); February 18, 2000 (United States)
- Running time: 120 minutes
- Country: United States
- Language: English
- Budget: $7 million
- Box office: $28 million

Boiler Room is a 2000 American crime drama film written and directed by Ben Younger and starring Giovanni Ribisi, Vin Diesel, Nia Long, Ben Affleck, Nicky Katt, Scott Caan, Tom Everett Scott, Ron Rifkin and Jamie Kennedy. The film was conceived when Younger interviewed for a job at brokerage firm Sterling Foster. "I walked in and immediately realized, 'This is my movie.' I mean, you see these kids and know something is going on."

Boiler Room premiered at the Sundance Film Festival on January 28, 2000, before being released by New Line Cinema on February 18, 2000. The film received positive reviews from critics while grossing $28 million against a $7 million budget, and the film was nominated for several awards including a Black Reel Award, a British Independent Film Award and two Independent Spirit Awards. It won the Special Jury Prize at the 2000 Deauville Film Festival.

== Plot ==
In 1999, Seth Davis runs a successful casino from his apartment, catering to college students. His father, federal judge Marty Davis, views him as a disappointment for his illegal activities and dropping out of Queens College. Cousin Adam introduces his associate, Greg Weinstein who plays blackjack, and recruits Seth into J. T. Marlin, a brokerage firm off the Long Island Expressway, promising he will get rich.

Seth attends the firm's group interview. Co-founder Jim Young explains work expectations, and how to become a millionaire within three years. Their techniques include cold calling investors to sell stock. Seth starts as a stockbroker trainee, requiring forty accounts to close for Greg's team, and passing the Series 7 exam, before working independently. To motivate brokers, the firm throws lavish parties with women, gambling, drugs and alcohol. He quickly closes the required accounts, wins his father's grudging approval, and starts romancing secretary Abbie Halpert, Greg's ex-girlfriend.

Gradually, he learns J. T. Marlin (which legitimate brokers believe was named to mimic J. P. Morgan) is running pump and dump schemes to create artificial demand in the stock of expired or fake companies and speculative penny stocks. After "pumping" questionable or illegal stock, the founders sell and trade for legitimate stocks for record profits. Meanwhile, investors lose their money, having no one to sell shares to when prices plummet. FBI agents, investigating the firm through phone taps, plan on turning Seth into their informant, while also pressuring Abbie for better results.

Seth passes his Series 7, becoming a broker. He calls Harry Reynard, purchasing manager for a gourmet food company. Initially reluctant, Harry invests after Seth lies about potential value, selling one-hundred shares at $8 each. When stock value drops, Harry asks what went wrong, but Seth persuades him to buy $50,000 more; Harry's life savings to purchase a house. After the stock tanks, Harry's wife Sara takes their children and leaves him.

Marty discovers the firm's "chop shop" disrepute and disowns Seth, accusing him of "destroying peoples' lives." Feeling guilty, Seth resolves to make the firm pay. Investigating further, he discovers the founders already prepared to abandon J. T. Marlin, destroy records, cut employee ties, and rebrand under a new firm, leaving victims to lengthy legal battles with little hope to recover their money. At Marty's office, Seth tearfully explains he closed his cardroom and only became a broker to gain his approval. He asks Marty to help with a scheme to rob the firm of $300,000 to bring them down and repay firm victims. His judgeship in jeopardy, Marty initially refuses, but later calls to reconcile and offer his help. The FBI record Marty's call with Seth, who is arrested for violating twenty-six SEC and NASD regulations. They offer immunity for Seth's testimony, but threaten to involve Marty, risking impeachment and disbarment. Seth declines, asserting he will refuse to cooperate if his father is implicated. They come to an agreement; Seth is released after staying overnight.

Following the FBI's instructions, Seth returns to work the next morning and copies evidence to a floppy disk. To recover Harry's investment, Seth lies to firm founder Michael Brantley that Harry is "a whale" from which they will lose even more money if they don't placate him with 100,000 shares of their next IPO. Brantley agrees, with a caveat; Harry cannot sell until the firm sells their own shares. Seth double-crosses both Michael and Greg by having senior broker Chris Varick sign Harry's sell ticket explaining, Chris could do one thing right before the firm is raided, ending their broker careers. Chris reluctantly agrees and flees the building to avoid arrest. The FBI arrives and raid the building as Seth leaves, wondering what to do with his life after severing ties with J. T. Marlin.

== Cast ==
- Giovanni Ribisi as Seth Davis
- Vin Diesel as Chris Varick
- Nia Long as Abbie Halpert
- Nicky Katt as Greg Weinstein
- Scott Caan as Richie O'Flaherty
- Ron Rifkin as Judge Marty Davis
- Jamie Kennedy as Adam
- Taylor Nichols as Harry Reynard
- Bill Sage as FBI Agent David Drew
- Tom Everett Scott as Michael Brantley
- Ben Affleck as Jim Young
- John Griesemer as The Concierge
- Mark Webber as Kid
- Christopher Fitzgerald as Kid
- Donna Mitchell as Seth's Mother, Mrs. Davis
- Jon Abrahams as Jeff
- Will McCormack as Mike, the Casino Person
- Anson Mount as Broker
- Kirk Acevedo as Broker
- Peter Maloney as Dr. Jacobs
- Marsha Dietlein as Susan Reynard
- Siobhan Fallon as Harry's Supervisor, Michelle

== Production ==
In interviews, Ben Younger said he was inspired to write the script for the film after going to a job interview at a Long Island-based brokerage firm that turned out to be a pyramid scheme. Younger said he used a speech given by a top broker to the would-be trainees as the model for the lecture the Jim Young character makes early in the film. Jordan Belfort, a former stockbroker and financial criminal who would write The Wolf of Wall Street, claimed that the movie was also loosely based on his rise and fall. Younger spent two years interviewing stockbrokers at boiler rooms, where callers aggressively peddle often fraudulent investments to consumers. Younger sold his script on the condition that he direct. Artisan Entertainment initially backed the production and helped bring actors Giovanni Ribisi, Vin Diesel, and Affleck to the project, but later backed out. New Line Cinema then stepped in for distribution.

=== Alternate ending ===
Another ending for the film was also shot. In it, it follows many of the same beats, but shows Harry Reynard retrieving a gun from his garage after his family leaves him. Instead of the FBI pulling into the parking lot of J.T. Marlin, Harry Reynard pulls in, walking up to the entrance with a briefcase containing his gun. On his way, he bumps into Seth, dropping a bunch of papers. Neither man recognizes the other, as they've never seen each other in person. Seth helps gather his things and gives them back to Harry, before heading to his car. In a voiceover, he said he never got Harry back his money, but hopes he was able to buy that house.

== Release ==
=== Box office ===
The film opened in the United States on February 18, 2000, alongside Hanging Up, Pitch Black and The Whole Nine Yards, grossing $6.7 million on its opening weekend. Eventually, the film grossed $17 million domestically and $11.8 million in other territories, with a worldwide total of $28.8 million.

=== Critical response ===
On Rotten Tomatoes the film has an approval rating of 66% based on reviews from 104 critics. The site's consensus is: "Its ending is disappointingly tidy, but Boiler Room boasts just enough sharp writing and brisk pacing to make getting there worthwhile." On Metacritic the film has a score of 63 out of 100 based on reviews from 34 critics, indicating "generally favorable" reviews Audiences surveyed by CinemaScore gave the film a grade C+ on scale of A to F.

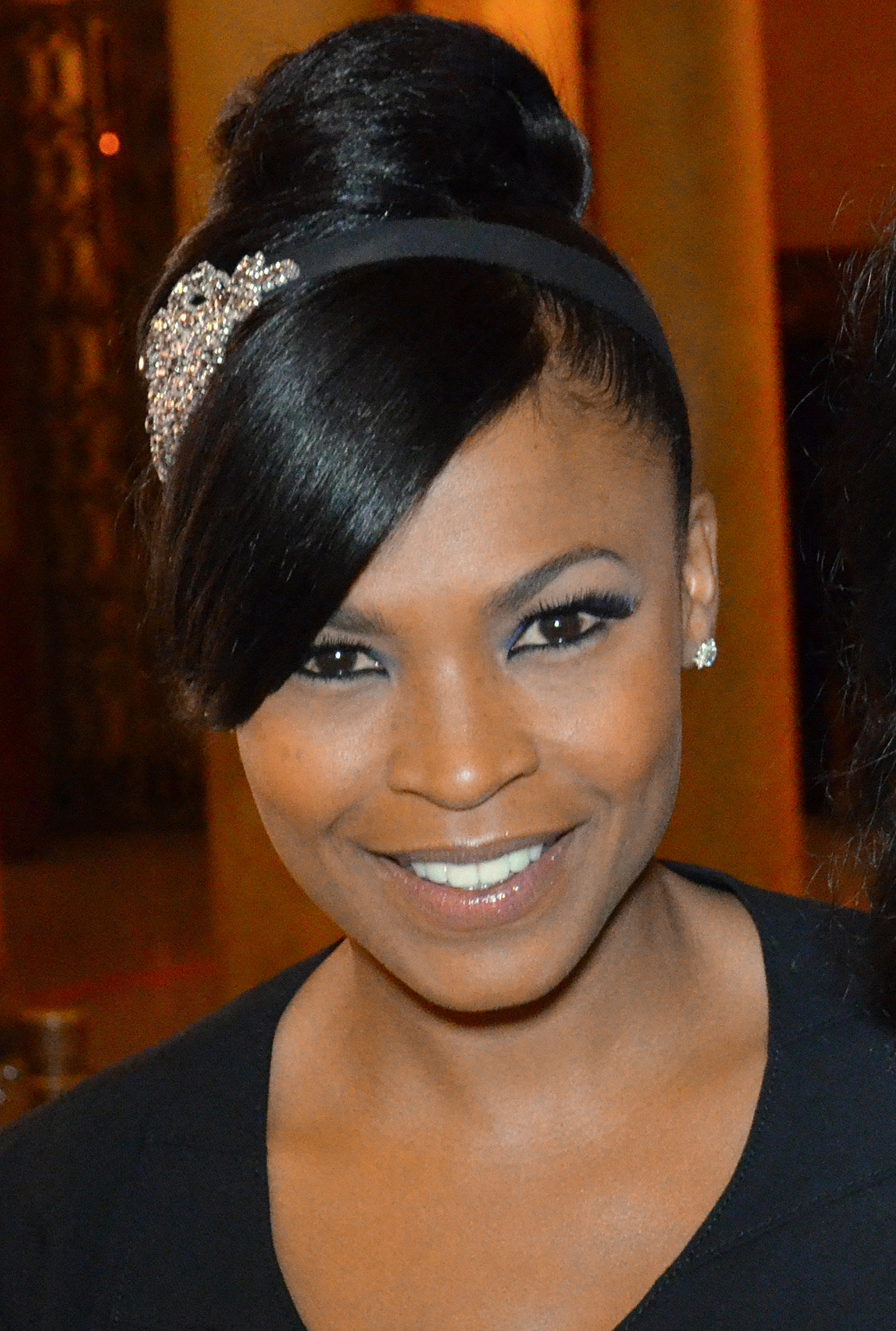
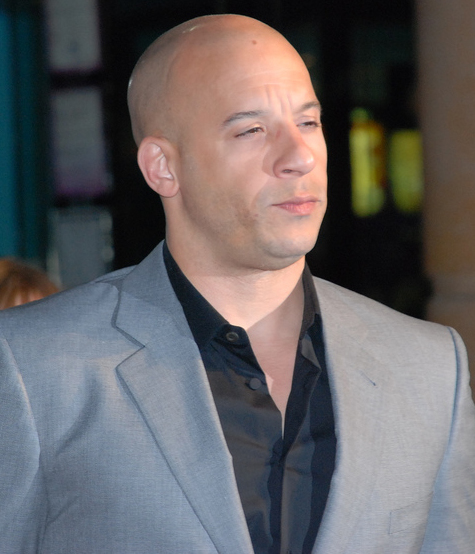
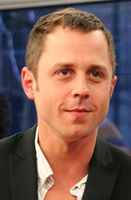
Ribisi, Diesel & Long received
positive attention from critics

Multiple critics noted the film's echoes of other corporate greed films like Wall Street and Glengarry Glenn Ross. Malcolm Johnson of the Hartford Courant wrote "Affleck, the best-known actor in the ensemble, proves no match for Alec Baldwin of 'Glengarry,' who played a similar character in David Mamet's look at a phony real estate operation." He also said "the screenplay misses the verbal pyrotechnics of both [Oliver] Stone and Mamet." A. O. Scott of The New York Times wrote Giovanni Ribisi "captures Seth's man-child suavity as well as his childish sensitivity, and the sweetness underneath his cynicism", and "Nia Long brings wit and patience to the underwritten role of Marlin's receptionist and Seth's love interest, a black woman surrounded by white guys trying to act like homeboys." Vin Diesel was also cited as being one of the more "likable" characters at the brokerage firm.

Roger Ebert of the Chicago Sun-Times gave the film 3.5 out of 4 stars and wrote: "Has the high-octane feel of real life, closely observed." Emanuel Levy of Variety gave the film a mixed review and said while it "begins extremely well as a saga of greed and conspicuous consumption...it gradually loses its bite." Levy also praised Affleck for his performance. James Berardinelli of ReelViews gave it 3 out of 4 stars and called it "A compelling movie-going experience." Berardinelli praised the attention to detail and said the film achieves "the same sort of insight into stock brokering that Glengarry Glenn Ross offered into sales. In fact, this aspect of the film is what makes Boiler Room a compelling movie-going experience. The characters and plot become secondary to the setting and atmosphere."

== Awards and nominations ==
Award	Category	Nominee(s)	Result	Ref.
Black Reel Awards	Best Supporting Actress	Nia Long	Nominated	
British Independent Film Awards	Best Foreign Independent Film		Nominated	
Deauville American Film Festival	Jury Special Prize	Ben Younger	Won (Note: Tied with Memento.)	
Deauville American Film Festival	Grand Special Prize	Ben Younger	Nominated	
Independent Spirit Awards	Best First Feature	Ben Younger, Jennifer Todd, Suzanne Todd	Nominated	
Independent Spirit Awards	Best First Screenplay	Ben Younger	Nominated	
Teen Choice Awards	Film - Choice Liar	Giovanni Ribisi	Nominated	
Teen Choice Awards	Film - Choice Sleazebag	Ben Affleck	Nominated	

== See also ==
- Bridge financing
- Boiler room (business)
- Wall Street
- Glengarry Glen Ross
- The Wolf of Wall Street
- The Big Short
- Rogue Trader
- Margin Call
