= Bleed for This =

- Theatrical release poster
- Directed by: Ben Younger
- Screenplay by: Ben Younger
- Story by: Pippa Bianco; Angelo Pizzo; Ben Younger
- Produced by: Bruce Cohen; Emma Tillinger Koskoff; Chad A. Verdi; Noah Kraft; Pamela Thur; Ben Younger
- Starring: Miles Teller; Aaron Eckhart; Katey Sagal; Ciarán Hinds; Ted Levine
- Cinematography: Larkin Seiple
- Edited by: Zac Stuart-Pontier
- Music by: Julia Holter
- Production companies: Bruce Cohen Productions; Magna Entertainment; Sikelia Productions; The Solution Entertainment Group; Verdi Productions; Younger Than You
- Distributed by: Open Road Films
- Release dates: September 2, 2016 (Telluride); November 18, 2016 (United States)
- Running time: 117 minutes
- Country: United States
- Language: English
- Budget: $16 million
- Box office: $7.2 million

Bleed for This is a 2016 American biographical sports film written and directed by Ben Younger and based on the life of former world champion boxer Vinny Pazienza. The film stars Miles Teller as Pazienza, with Aaron Eckhart, Katey Sagal, Ciarán Hinds, and Ted Levine in supporting roles.

The film had its world premiere at the 43rd Annual Telluride Film Festival on September 2, 2016, and was released in the United States on November 18, 2016, by Open Road Films.

== Plot ==
In November 1988, Vinny Pazienza boxes Roger Mayweather for the WBC World Light Welterweight Title. He arrives late to the weigh-in, having spent hours riding a stationary bicycle in order to make the weight limit. Vinny's final weight is 140 pounds even, which qualifies him for the fight.

Instead of sleeping, the cocky Vinny spends all night at the casino. The following day, he loses to Mayweather. At one point during the fight, Vinny is hit after the bell. His manager, Lou Duva, causes a scene by going after Mayweather and gets punched for his trouble. At the post-match press conference, Duva admits that he feels Vinny isn't serious about the championship and should consider retiring from boxing. This angers Vinny's father and coach, Angelo, and he confronts Duva. In the ensuing argument, Vinny announces that he wants another fight and fires Duva. He replaced his father as coach with Kevin Rooney; Angelo grudgingly agrees to become his manager instead.

Angelo receives confirmation that Vinny has been granted a new title fight against Gilbert Dele. Kevin objects at first, but still believes that Vinny can win the fight. Vinny wins the bout via technical knockout, which makes him the WBA World Light Middleweight champion. Some days later, Angelo tells Vinny that he must defend his title against Panamanian boxer Roberto Durán. Vinny is pleased and drives with his friend Jimmy to get some coffee. On the way, they are hit head-on by an oncoming car. Jimmy sustains minor injuries, but Vinny suffers a critical neck injury. As he regains consciousness in the hospital, the doctor informs him that he might never walk again and will certainly never fight again. He offers to better Vinny's chances of walking by performing a spinal fusion. While this would guarantee that he can walk again, it would limit movement in his neck and leave him medically unfit to box.

Against his doctor's recommendation, Vinny opts to be fitted with a Halo, a medical device consisting of a circular metal brace screwed into his skull in four spots and propped up with four metal rods. This would allow him to regain movement in his neck, which could allow him to box again. Despite Vinny's optimism, Rooney is skeptical and refuses to train him any further. Disobeying his doctors' advice, Vinny begins to work out in his basement. He tells Kevin, who finally agrees to help after realizing how much boxing means to Vinny. Angelo eventually catches them, and kicks Kevin out of the house.

Six months after the accident, Vinny is ready to have the halo removed. He chooses to endure the pain of having the screws removed without taking any sedatives. In his comeback match, it is confirmed that Vinny will once again fight Durán. The fight is held in Las Vegas, in 1990. In the first six rounds, Vinny struggles to match the more fit and better conditioned Durán. Suddenly inspired by his own tenacity, Vinny lands a good punch late in the fight. Vinny eventually wins, via 12-round majority decision (114-114, 115-113, 115-113).

In the final scene, Vinny is interviewed by a journalist. She asks him about the biggest lie he was ever told as a boxer. Vinny pauses, then says the biggest lie is, "It's not that simple".

== Cast ==
- Miles Teller as Vincenzo "Vinny The Pazmanian Devil" Pazienza
- Aaron Eckhart as Kevin Rooney
- Katey Sagal as Louise Pazienza
- Ciarán Hinds as Angelo Pazienza
- Ted Levine as Lou Duva
- Jordan Gelber as Dan Duva
- Daniel Sauli as Jon
- Amanda Clayton as Doreen Pazienza
- Christine Evangelista as Ashley
- Tina Casciani as Heather
- Liz Carey as Charity
- Denise Schaefer as Leigh
- Joe Jafo Carriere as Cebol
- Gia Skova as Duran Ring Girl

Professional boxers Peter Quillin, Jean-Pierre Augustin and Edwin Rodríguez appear as fighters Roger Mayweather, Gilbert Dele and Roberto Durán, respectively, while Godsmack singer Sully Erna plays a Blackjack dealer at Caesars Palace.

== Production ==
In September 2010, it was announced Angelo Pizzo had signed on to write the film, with Chad A. Verdi, Noah Kraft, and Glen Ciano producing while Michael Corrente would direct the film. In 2011, Verdi sent Kraft to meet with Martin Scorsese after an introduction from Senator Sheldon Whitehouse. Scorsese agreed to partner with Verdi and Kraft on the project and signed on as an executive producer. In 2012, Verdi and Kraft hired Younger to write and direct the feature.

In September 2014, it was announced that Miles Teller, Aaron Eckhart, Amanda Clayton, Ciarán Hinds, and Katey Sagal had joined the cast of the film, with Younger directing from a screenplay he wrote, while Scorsese and Emma Koskoff Tillinger, Bruce Cohen and Pamela Thur-Weir serving as producers. In December 2014, Tina Casciani joined the cast of the film. Aaron Eckhart gained a reported 45 pounds for the role of Kevin Rooney.

Teller trained for 5 months with nutritionist Gary Kobat and trainer Darrell Foster to get in shape for the role of Vinny Paz.

== Filming ==
On November 10, 2014, filming started in Warwick, Rhode Island. On December 10, filming took place at Twin River Casino in Lincoln, Rhode Island. On December 16 and 17, filming took place at Dunkin' Donuts Center in Providence.

== Lawsuit ==
On July 27, 2017, Pazienza filed a formal lawsuit against filmmakers Younger and Verdi, citing forgery and failure to pay $175,000 of the promised $300,000 payout for the rights to his life's story. It was dismissed on December 7 of the same year.

== Release ==
In February 2015, the first image of Teller was released. In May 2015, Open Road Films acquired distribution rights to the film. The film had its world premiere at the 43rd Annual Telluride Film Festival on September 2, 2016, before screening at the 2016 Toronto International Film Festival. Originally, the film was scheduled to open in a limited release on November 4, 2016, before opening wide on November 23. In October 2016, the film was rescheduled to have a wide opening on November 18, 2016, forgoing a limited release.

=== Box office ===
Bleed for This opened alongside Fantastic Beasts and Where to Find Them and The Edge of Seventeen, as well as the wide expansions of Moonlight and Billy Lynn's Long Halftime Walk, and was initially expected to gross around $5 million from 1,549 theaters. After grossing less than $900,000 on its opening day expectations were lowered to $2–3 million; it ended up debuting to $2.4 million, finishing 8th at the box office. In its second weekend the film dropped to 17th at the box office, grossing $949,898.

=== Critical response ===
On Rotten Tomatoes the film holds an approval rating of 70% based on 145 reviews, with an average rating of 6.23/10. The website's critical consensus reads, "Bleed for This rises on the strength of Miles Teller's starring performance to deliver a solid fact-based boxing drama that takes a few genre clichés on the chin but keeps on coming." On Metacritic the film has a weighted average score of 62 out of 100, based on 34 critics, indicating "generally favorable" reviews. Audiences polled by CinemaScore gave the film an average grade of "A−" on an A+ to F scale.

Richard Roeper of the Chicago Sun-Times wrote: "Miles Teller gives the performance of his career as the indefatigable Vinny 'The Pazmanian Devil' Pazienza, and writer-director Ben Younger delivers one of the best boxing movies of the decade in Bleed for This." Peter Debruge of Variety wrote: "Teller is terrific, which should come as no surprise to Whiplash fans, though no less significant, the film represents a significant return for writer-director Ben Younger."

TheWrap.com's Claudia Puig wrote: "The boxing drama Bleed for This has a powerful story and a strong lead performance in its corner, but falls short of knockout status. Hampered by clichéd writing and stereotypical portrayals, this extraordinary true-life account feels run-of-the-mill."

== See also ==
- List of boxing films
