= If These Walls Could Talk 2 =

2000 American television film

- DVD cover
- Written by: Jane Anderson; Sylvia Sichel; Alex Sichel; Anne Heche
- Directed by: Jane Anderson; Martha Coolidge; Anne Heche
- Starring: Vanessa Redgrave; Chloë Sevigny; Michelle Williams; Sharon Stone; Ellen DeGeneres
- Music by: Basil Poledouris
- Country of origin: United States
- Original language: English

Production
- Producer: Mary Kane
- Cinematography: Paul Elliott; Robbie Greenberg; Peter Deming
- Editor: Margaret Goodspeed
- Running time: 96 minutes
- Production company: HBO Films

Original release
- Network: HBO
- Release: March 5, 2000

Related
- If These Walls Could Talk

If These Walls Could Talk 2 is a 2000 American television film broadcast on HBO. It is a sequel to the 1996 HBO film If These Walls Could Talk and is likewise a female-centered anthology film, with three separate segments all set in the same house within three different decades of the 20th century. Unlike the earlier film, in which all the stories relate to abortion, all the storylines in this film deal with lesbian couples.

The three segments, "1961", "1972", and "2000", were directed by Jane Anderson, Martha Coolidge, and Anne Heche, respectively.

== Plot ==
=== 1961 ===
An elderly couple, Edith and Abby sit in a cinema watching a lesbian-themed film The Children's Hour. A couple walks out of the theater in disgust at the film, and a group of kids laugh when they see Edith and Abby holding hands.

Later, at the home they have shared for 30 years, Abby falls from a ladder. At the hospital, the doctors tell Edith that Abby may have suffered a stroke. Edith asks to see Abby but is not permitted as she is not a family member. Instead she spends the night in the waiting room. In the morning, Edith learns from a more sympathetic nurse that Abby died alone during the night, and none of the hospital workers informed her after it had happened.

Edith telephones Abby's nephew, Ted, her only living relative, to tell him the news. Before Ted and his family come for the funeral, Edith removes all traces that they were a couple. She makes it look like they had separate bedrooms, and removes photographs of the two of them together.

At the house afterwards, Ted and Edith talk about the fact that the house was in Abby's name. Although Edith contributed equally to the mortgage, she legally owns no part of it. As Ted’s wife Alice packs up Abby's belongings, Ted tells Edith that he would consider letting Edith stay in the house and pay him rent. Edith tells him that Abby would have wanted her to stay in the house, as that was what they always talked about.

Ted eventually tells Edith that it would be better if he sells the house and she finds a place of her own, though adding that he will wait until she finds a new place before putting the house on the market. The family leaves, with Ted telling Edith that he will be in touch in a couple of weeks to discuss what she is going to do.

=== 1972 ===
Linda, a young student, now shares the house with three friends, all lesbians. They face conflict with the feminist group they are part of when the other women do not want to include lesbian issues, despite the fact that Linda and her friends helped to found the group and fought for free contraception on campus with their straight friends.

At a lesbian bar they have not been to before, the friends are surprised and disappointed to see women apparently fulfilling traditional butch and femme roles. They laugh at Amy, a young butch woman who is wearing a tie. Amy asks Linda to dance, but she refuses while her friends are still there. The others soon leave and Linda stays behind and dances with Amy. Later, Amy gives Linda a ride home on her motorcycle and they kiss. Linda invites Amy to return the next day.

The next day, Linda and the others are arguing with a woman from the feminist group when Amy arrives. Linda is embarrassed and is short with Amy who quickly leaves. Linda's friends tease her about Amy and question how they can be taken seriously as feminists if they associate with people like Amy. They cannot understand why a woman would dress like a man when they have fought so hard to escape such stereotypical roles.

Linda goes to Amy's house and apologizes. They sleep together. The next morning Linda sees a picture of Amy as a child, dressed like a boy. She asks Amy if Amy is supposed to be the man and Linda the woman. Amy says no and accuses Linda of being afraid that people will know what she is if she is seen with Amy.

Amy goes to Linda's house for dinner. Linda urges her friends to give Amy a chance, but an awkward evening deteriorates when Linda's friends criticize Amy and try to make her change her clothes. Amy leaves, upset. Linda follows her home and tells her that she was never ashamed of Amy, but only of herself. They reconcile.

=== 2000 ===
The house is now inhabited by Fran and Kal, a couple hoping to have a baby together. They hope to get a sperm donation from Tom and Arnold, a gay couple, but when the men are reluctant to agree to stay out of the baby's life, the women decide not to go ahead. Later, Kal tells Fran that she does not want to know the father of the baby and they agree to use an anonymous donor. They look for donors on the internet and find a company to use. Going through endless profiles of potential donors, Kal gets upset that she herself cannot get Fran pregnant.

When they discover that Fran is ovulating, Kal hurries to the donor company to get the sperm. She inseminates Fran, but with no success. After visiting the local elementary school a few times, they share their worries for their child. Fran and Kal know that their baby will face discrimination because of society's views on lesbian families, but hope that their love for each other and their child will be enough. After three attempts to get pregnant, they go to a doctor to help them conceive. Shortly afterwards they discover that Fran is pregnant.

== Cast ==
=== 1961 ===
- Vanessa Redgrave as Edith Tree
- Paul Giamatti as Ted Hedley
- Elizabeth Perkins as Alice Hedley
- Marian Seldes as Abby Hedley
- Jenny O'Hara as Marge Carpenter
- Marley McClean as Maggie Hedley

=== 1972 ===
- Michelle Williams as Linda
- Chloë Sevigny as Amy
- Nia Long as Karen
- Natasha Lyonne as Jeanne
- Heather McComb as Diane
- Amy Carlson as Michelle
- Lee Garlington as Georgette
- Rashida Jones as Feminist

=== 2000 ===
- Sharon Stone as Fran
- Ellen DeGeneres as Kal
- Regina King as Allie
- Kathy Najimy as Doctor
- Mitchell Anderson as Arnold
- Lucinda Jenney as Ella's Mother
- George Newbern as Tom
- Steffani Brass as Ella

== Awards and nominations ==
| Year | Award | Category | Nominee(s) | Result | Ref. |
|---|---|---|---|---|---|
| 2000 | Artios Awards | Best Casting for TV Movie of the Week | John Papsidera | Nominated | |
| 2000 | Columbus International Film & Animation Festival | Bronze Plaque Award (Social Issues) | | Won | |
| 2000 | Online Film & Television Association Awards | Best Supporting Actress in a Motion Picture or Miniseries | Vanessa Redgrave | Nominated | |
| 2000 | Paris Lesbian and Feminist Film Festival | Best Film (Audience Award) | Jane Anderson, Martha Coolidge, and Anne Heche | Won | |
| 2000 | Primetime Emmy Awards | Outstanding Made for Television Movie | Suzanne Todd, Jennifer Todd, Ellen DeGeneres, and Mary Kane | Nominated | |
| 2000 | Primetime Emmy Awards | Outstanding Supporting Actress in a Miniseries or a Movie | Vanessa Redgrave | Won | |
| 2000 | Primetime Emmy Awards | Outstanding Writing for a Miniseries, Movie or a Special | Jane Anderson (for "1961") | Nominated | |
| 2000 | Primetime Emmy Awards | Outstanding Casting for a Miniseries, Movie or a Special | John Papsidera | Nominated | |
| 2000 | Women in Film Crystal + Lucy Awards | Lucy Award (Note: To the Creators and Cast of If These Walls Could Talk and If These Walls Could Talk 2. In recognition of excellence and innovation in a creative work that has enhanced the perception of women through the medium of television.) | | Won | |
| 2001 | Directors Guild of America Awards | Outstanding Directorial Achievement in Movies for Television or Miniseries | Martha Coolidge (for "1972") | Nominated | |
| 2001 | GLAAD Media Awards | Outstanding TV Movie | | Won | |
| 2001 | Golden Globe Awards | Best Supporting Actress in a Miniseries or Motion Picture Made for Television | Vanessa Redgrave | Won | |
| 2001 | NAACP Image Awards | Outstanding Actress in a Television Movie, Mini-Series or Dramatic Special | Nia Long | Nominated | |
| 2001 | Outfest | Screen Idol Award – Female | Vanessa Redgrave | Won | |
| 2001 | Producers Guild of America Awards | David L. Wolper Award for Outstanding Producer of Long-Form Television | | Nominated | |
| 2001 | Satellite Awards | Best Actress in a Miniseries or a Motion Picture Made for Television | Vanessa Redgrave | Nominated | |
| 2001 | Screen Actors Guild Awards | Outstanding Performance by a Female Actor in a Miniseries or Television Movie | Vanessa Redgrave | Won | |

== See also ==
- List of LGBT-related films directed by women
