= Must Love Dogs =

2005 romantic comedy movie directed by Gary David Goldberg

- Theatrical release poster
- Directed by: Gary David Goldberg
- Written by: Gary David Goldberg
- Based on: Must Love Dogs by Claire Cook
- Produced by: Gary David Goldberg; Jennifer Todd; Suzanne Todd
- Starring: Diane Lane; John Cusack; Dermot Mulroney; Elizabeth Perkins; Stockard Channing; Christopher Plummer
- Cinematography: John Bailey
- Edited by: Roger Bondelli; Eric A. Sears
- Music by: Craig Armstrong
- Production companies: Team Todd; Ubu Productions
- Distributed by: Warner Bros. Pictures
- Release date: July 29, 2005
- Running time: 98 minutes
- Country: United States
- Language: English
- Budget: $30 million
- Box office: $58.4 million

Must Love Dogs is a 2005 American romantic comedy film based on Claire Cook's 2002 novel of the same name. Starring Diane Lane and John Cusack, it is the second and final film to be written, produced, and directed by Gary David Goldberg and was produced on a budget of $30 million. The film focuses on a woman's struggle with divorce and meeting new people afterward.

Production started on October 12, 2004, with a release date of July 29, 2005. Critical opinion was slightly mixed to unfavorable, who called it predictable, but indicated that the actors were not to blame. The film was also the final project ever to be produced by independent company Ubu Productions. It took the fifth spot on its opening weekend, and has grossed $58.4 million worldwide. The film was released on VHS and DVD on December 20, 2005, and then released on Warner Archive Blu-ray disc on November 26, 2024.

== Plot ==
Sarah Nolan, a 40-year-old divorced preschool teacher, is urged by her family to date. Showing her photos of potential men, she is not interested in pursuing a relationship. Jake Anderson, another recent divorcé, is in a similar position; his friend Charlie wants to match him with Sherry. However, he prefers focusing on his handcrafted boats.

Sarah's sister Carol visits and they discuss Bob Connor, a parent from school. Sarah finds him attractive but does not want anything complicated. Carol sets up an ad for her on perfectmatch.com, using her high school graduation photo. She is described as voluptuous and her dates "must love dogs" (Sarah is currently caring for her brother Michael's Newfoundland, while he goes through marital problems). She has several disastrous dates with men: a cryer, a criminal, and one who is attracted to teenaged girls.

Jake is confronted by Sherry at an art gallery, who wants to know why he did not call, but he is not interested. Charlie then hands him a copy of Sarah's dating profile, telling him he has a date with her the next day at a dog park. It proves to be awkward: Jake shows up with a borrowed terrier and offends her when he begins to analyze her profile, then he reveals the dog is not really his. When she accuses him of being deceptive, he points out the requirement was "Must love dogs," not "Must own a dog." Sarah leaves abruptly but agrees to see him again.

Sarah and Jake go to dinner, where he asks her why she got divorced. She explains that her ex stopped loving her and was never ready to have children. Now, her ex is with a woman fifteen years younger with a baby on the way. The date progresses back to her house, where they find neither has a condom. They frantically drive around the city seeking condoms, but when they finally find them neither is in the mood.

Jake tells Charlie that Sarah intrigues him so, that night, he tries to call her. Meanwhile, as she has connected with Bob Connor, she shows up at his home but finds him with her much younger co-worker, June. Sensing they are on a date, she flees, dropping her wallet.

Arriving home, Sarah finds her brother Michael drunk over his marital problems, and Jake, who has been taking care of him. Jake and she share a kiss, he then takes Michael home while she lights candles to set the mood. Bob shows up ahead of Jake, returning her wallet. He says he and June are not involved, and then kisses her just as Jake gets back. Upset, he leaves.

Around Thanksgiving Sarah calls Bob, they go to a hotel and have sex. In the morning, he is rude and she realizes he had slept with June. He had not told her because he still wanted to hook up with her.

Meanwhile, Jake takes Sherry to see Doctor Zhivago. Sarah sees him leaving the theater afterward, runs up and begins discussing the film with him. She then notices Sherry and realizes they are on a date. Sarah flees again, and when Sherry asks Jake up to her apartment, he declines, walking home.

Jake runs into a man named Bill outside a coffee shop, not realizing he is Sarah's father. When Jake confesses that he is heartbroken, Bill mentions that he has a daughter who is single but Jake declines.

Having coffee with Sarah later, Bill quotes Jake and she realizes Jake had been talking about her. She heads over to Jake's with the dog, but he is on the lake with his boat, so cannot hear her yelling from the shore. She convinces a girls crew team to take her out to him, eventually diving in and swimming to his boat. Climbing in, Sarah tells Jake how she feels about him and they kiss.

Later, when telling the story of how they met, they say in unison that they found each other at a dog park.

== Cast ==
- Diane Lane as Sarah Nolan
- John Cusack as Jacob "Jake" Anderson
- Elizabeth Perkins as Carol Nolan
- Brad William Henke as Leo
- Stockard Channing as Dolly
- Christopher Plummer as William "Bill" Nolan
- Colin Egglesfield as David
- Ali Hillis as Christine Nolan
- Dermot Mulroney as Bob Bobby Connor
- Victor Webster as Eric
- Ben Shenkman as Charlie
- Julie Gonzalo as June
- Jordana Spiro as Sherry
- Glenn Howerton as Michael
- Krikor Satamian as Armenian Restaurant Owner
- Michael Spound as Marc
- Marylouise Burke as Aunt Eileen
- Will Rothhaar as Jeremy
- Patrick St. Esprit as Marshall
- Josh Stamberg as Lennie
- Jon Lindstrom as Peter
- Laura Kightlinger as Marcia
- Suzy Nakamura as Mai
- Jamie Denbo as Bertha

== Casting ==
Diane Lane took the part because she wanted to do something different from her recent roles and wanted to keep the shoot local. She was extremely nervous about any improv that Cusack added to the film. When Cusack tried to make her improv she thought, "I don’t feel that confidence. I start blushing profusely and I get all sweaty and, I don’t know. Old school." John Cusack was about to do another film in Europe but it fell through at the last minute. He met with Goldberg and after reading the script they asked him to be in the film. Impressed with the actors that were already signed on, Cusack thought, "that's a pretty great pedigree, so I was kind of happy to be asked to join such a great group." Cusack had always wanted to work with Lane and had been following her career for some time. Kyra Sedgwick was originally cast in the part of Carol Nolan, which was ultimately played by Elizabeth Perkins. Brad William Henke took the role of Leo because he "fell in love with the fact that it wasn’t a stereotypical character." The crew did not mind what the character looked like and he was able to play a normal guy.

== Production ==
Goldberg was first interested in starting this project when he found Cook's book. He thought it had a lot of humor and started working on getting the film rights. Goldberg worked closely with Cook, sharing all the draft copies with her and asking for input. He even included her in the casting process. Even though Cook only made it on set twice she was "so pleased with what they’ve done. It's really such a tribute to the book and just a great movie in its own right."

Goldberg's "process is to just get an actor and then write and re-write and work on the set." Goldberg was constantly bringing new pages to the set while Cusack contributed ideas for him to work with. Cusack also performed in takes where Goldberg allowed him to say whatever came out of his mouth.

=== Mother Teresa ===
"The dog in Claire's book wasn't a Newfoundland, but I'm crazy for Newfies; they have such sweet natures and their eyes are so expressive."

— Gary David Goldberg, director

Goldberg chose a Newfoundland to play the part, even though it was a different breed in the novel. Mother Teresa was played by two females, Molly and Mabel. Lane explained, "Like with kids, they prefer hiring twins." The dogs were chosen when they were only puppies and were trained by Boone Narr for several months before filming. During filming the dogs were still puppies, being 6 months old and 80 pounds. When production ended Goldberg adopted both dogs. Part of the training of the dogs was to follow the commands of the trainer who was situated off-camera while focusing attention on the actor.

== Release ==
=== Critical reception ===
On Rotten Tomatoes, it has an approval rating of 37% based on reviews from 149 critics. The site's consensus was that "Despite good work from its likable leads, the romantic comedy Must Love Dogs is too predictable." On Metacritic, it has a weighted average score of 46 out of 100, based on 36 critics, indicating "mixed or average reviews". Audiences polled by CinemaScore gave the film an average grade of "B+" on an A+ to F scale.

Roger Ebert thought that although Lane and Cusack are "two of the most likable actors in the movies", they "deserve characters that the movie takes more seriously and puts at more risk", giving the film two out of four stars. Stephen Holden of The New York Times gave the film a negative review, wondering how the actors were "bamboozled into lending their talents to the project." He added that the film has "contrived little incidents", "is so clueless", and is "hopelessly clichéd and out of date".

A more positive review from Rolling Stone said that the film had a "great title and appealing performances" from Lane and Cusack. Giving the film three out of four stars, the review also said that "Just when you think you have Goldberg figured, he springs fresh surprises." Ann Hornaday from The Washington Post noted the film "works because Lane is one of those actresses who can do just about anything and still earn the audience's undying love." Hornaday mentioned that the movie "features an enormously appealing supporting cast" and commented on how well Lane and Cusack worked together on the film.

=== Box office ===
Validating the critic's views, the film opened in the number five spot with $12.8 million in 2,505 theaters with a $5,131 average per theater. Must Love Dogs stayed in the theater for twelve weeks, staying in the top 10 for its first three weeks. The film grossed $58,405,313, placing it at number 66 for all films released in 2005.

=== Home media ===
Must Love Dogs was released on December 20, 2005, on DVD and VHS. The video "is lush but soft, and some artificial sharpening only adds insult to injury, doing nothing to alleviate the overall lack of fine detail." The audio is very standard and "wouldn't sound any different through a pair of headphones". The extras are composed of four additional scenes lasting for about eight minutes with optional commentary from Goldberg. There is also a gag reel titled "Pass the Beef" which lasts for about one minute. The film was then later released on Warner Archive Blu-ray disc on November 26, 2024. The Blu-ray has the same extras as the DVD.

== Soundtrack ==
Must Love Dogs - Music from the Motion Picture

Soundtrack album by Various Artists
- Released: July 29, 2005
- Length: 42:44
- Label: Sony

Soundtrack
Review scores
Source	Rating
AllMusic	3/5 stars

Track #	Title	Performer	Length (M:SS)
1	"Brown Penny"	Christopher Plummer	1:03
2	"When Will I Be Loved?"	Linda Ronstadt	3:29
3	"The First Cut Is the Deepest"	Sheryl Crow	3:47
4	"Hey There Lonely Girl"	Eddie Holman	3:35
5	"Don't It Feel Good"	Stephanie Bentley	3:29
6	"I Never"	Rilo Kiley	4:31
7	"I'd Rather Be in Love with You"	Susan Haynes	2:48
8	"Dance All Night"	Ryan Adams	3:14
9	"Shell"	Susie Suh	4:29
10	"What Kind of Love"	Rodney Crowell	3:59
11	"Prelude/Lara's Theme from Dr. Zhivago"	Erich Kunzel, Cincinnati Pops Orchestra	5:47
12	"This Will Be (An Everlasting Love)"	Natalie Cole	2:52
13	"C'mon Get Happy!"	Diane Lane, Dermot Mulroney, Stockard Channing, Elizabeth Perkins, Ali Hillis	1:03
