= Prime (film) =

- Theatrical release poster
- Directed by: Ben Younger
- Written by: Ben Younger
- Produced by: Jennifer Todd; Suzanne Todd
- Starring: Meryl Streep; Uma Thurman; Bryan Greenberg; Jon Abrahams
- Cinematography: William Rexer
- Edited by: Kristina Boden
- Music by: Ryan Shore
- Production companies: Stratus Film Company; Team Todd; Younger Than You
- Distributed by: Universal Pictures (United States and Canada); Focus Features (International)
- Release dates: September 21, 2005 (San Diego); October 28, 2005
- Running time: 105 minutes
- Country: United States
- Language: English
- Budget: $22 million
- Box office: $67.9 million

Prime is a 2005 American romantic comedy-drama film starring Uma Thurman, Meryl Streep, and Bryan Greenberg. It was written and directed by Ben Younger.

In Manhattan Rafi, a career driven 30-something professional, is pursued by 20-something painter David, who happens to be her therapist's son.

The film grossed $67.9 million worldwide.

== Plot ==
Rafi is a recently divorced, 37-year-old career woman from Manhattan who becomes romantically involved with David, a talented 23-year-old painter from the Upper West Side. She shares all her secrets with her therapist Lisa who, unbeknownst to her, is David's mother. Lisa is supportive of Rafi's relationship with a younger man before she learns who he is.

Once Lisa discovers the connection, she finds herself faced with the ethical and moral dilemma of counselling David's girlfriend. But she also realizes she feels differently about the relationship, now that she knows her son is involved. Lisa consults her own therapist, and they decide that it is in the best interest of her patient Rafi for Lisa to continue treatment, as long as the relationship remains the "fling" they suppose it to be.

However, once Lisa realizes the relationship is serious, she tells Rafi that she is David's mother. Feeling embarrassed and betrayed, Rafi ends her treatment with Lisa. Their differences causing problems between them, Rafi and David break up.

A couple of weeks later, David is enjoying a night on the town with his best friend Morris; David gets drunk and ends up sleeping with Sue, Rafi's friend from work. The same day, after bumping into each other at the supermarket and going back to David's place, David and Rafi start seeing each other again.

The newly reestablished couple also try to make the relationship stronger by going to a Friday night dinner with David's family. The rift between Rafi and Lisa is patched up. However, when Rafi brings up the possibility of her and David having children, Lisa reacts strongly.

A few days later, Rafi discovers that David had slept with Sue, so they fight. After sulking for some time, David goes to seek Lisa's help as both his mother and as a therapist. She advises him to do what he can to keep the relationship, because it was through Rafi that Lisa was able to understand David's career as an artist.

David goes back to Rafi to apologize and offer to give her a child because that is what she wants the most. At first, Rafi accepts his apology. They fall into bed together, and Rafi realizes how deep David's love must be for him to make such a sacrifice—he is so much younger than she is, and she fears that having a child at his age could negatively impact his art career. Somehow, she convinces him that love is not enough to keep a relationship going, and they break up.

A year later, David and Morris leave the restaurant where he and Rafi had their first proper date. Going back to retrieve his forgotten hat, he spots Rafi but she does not see him; he gets his hat, rushes out the door, and hides. David defrosts the glass a bit to watch her, and she turns around and sees him. They share a smile before parting.

== Cast ==
- Meryl Streep as Lisa Metzger Bloomberg
- Uma Thurman as Raffaela "Rafi" Gardet
- Bryan Greenberg as David Bloomberg
- Jon Abrahams as Morris
- Annie Parisse as Katherine
- Madhur Jaffrey as Rita
- John Rothman as Jack Bloomberg
- Jerry Adler as Sam
- Doris Belack as Blanch
- Zak Orth as Randall
- Aubrey Dollar as Michelle
- Ato Essandoh as Damien
- Naomi Aborn as Dinah Bloomberg
- Lotte Mandel as Bubi
- Alex Webb as Art Collector

== Production ==
The role of Rafi was originally going to be played by Sandra Bullock. Bullock completed rehearsals with Younger and Greenberg, but pulled out just before filming began, because she wanted major script changes, and the director was not willing to change the script.

Bryan Greenberg's trip to New York to film this movie is documented as part of HBO's semi-reality series Unscripted.

== Music ==
The film's original score was composed by Ryan Shore.

== Soundtrack ==
Prime

Soundtrack album by Various Artists
- Released: October 28, 2005
- Genre: Pop, jazz, film music
- Label: Varèse Sarabande
- Producer: Ryan Shore

The soundtrack is a mix of different music genres such as jazz and pop. The composer of this soundtrack is Ryan Shore.

1. RJD2 – "Ghostwriter" (Remix)
2. Duke Ellington & John Coltrane – "In a Sentimental Mood"
3. Rufus Wainwright – "Peach Trees"
4. Ryan Shore – "Rafi and David"
5. Le Tigre – "Fake French"
6. Stacey Kent – "Isn't This a Lovely Day?"
7. Daniel Merriweather – "Still Got Me"
8. Ray LaMontagne – "Shelter"
9. Debi Nova – "Laylo"
10. Sidsel Endresen & Bugge Wesseltoft – "Try"
11. Rachael Yamagata – "I Wish You Love"
12. Ryan Shore – "Prime Suite"

== Reception ==
=== Critical response ===
On the review aggregator website Rotten Tomatoes, the film holds an approval rating of 50% based on 118 reviews, with an average rating of 5.6/10. The website's critics consensus reads, "Though Streep is dependably terrific in her role, the rest of the movie is too sitcom-ish, and the romance itself is dull." Metacritic, which uses a weighted average, assigned the film a score of 58 out of 100, based on 32 critics, indicating "mixed or average" reviews.

Though critics had dislike for the film's plot mechanics, the performances, especially Streep's and Thurman's, were praised. In a three-star review, Roger Ebert wrote. "Streep has that ability to cut through the solemnity of a scene with a zinger that reveals how all human effort is, after all, comic at some level."

Lisa Schwarzbaum of Entertainment Weekly wrote, "Prime [...] is much more interested in the interpretation of dreams than how a hottie like Thurman could be interested in a blandy like Greenberg's [character]."

=== Box office ===
The film opened at #3 at the U.S. box office, making $6,220,935 USD in its opening weekend, behind The Legend of Zorro and Saw II.
