= Bill Tindall =

American aerospace engineer (1925–1995)

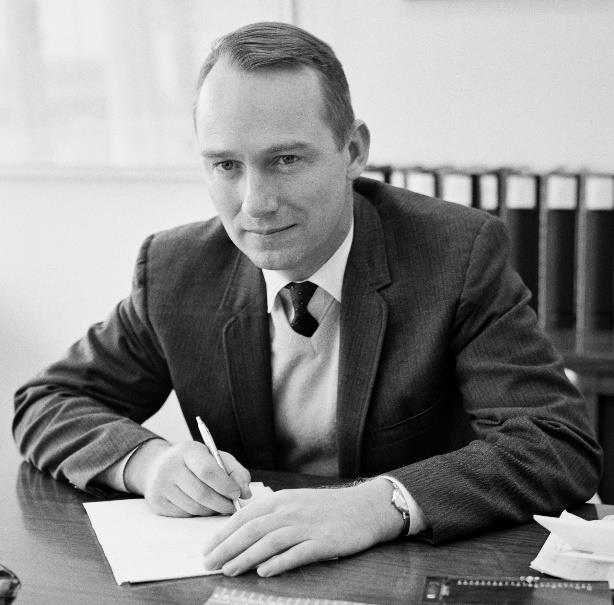
- Tindall in 1965
- Born: February 20, 1925; New York City, U.S.
- Died: November 20, 1995 (aged 70)
- Other names: Howard Wilson "Bill" Tindall, Jr.
- Education: Brown University, B.S. 1948
- Occupations: Aerospace engineer and early expert in orbital mechanics
- Years active: 1950s-1980s
- Known for: Chief of Apollo Data Priority Coordination
- Notable work: "Tindallgrams"

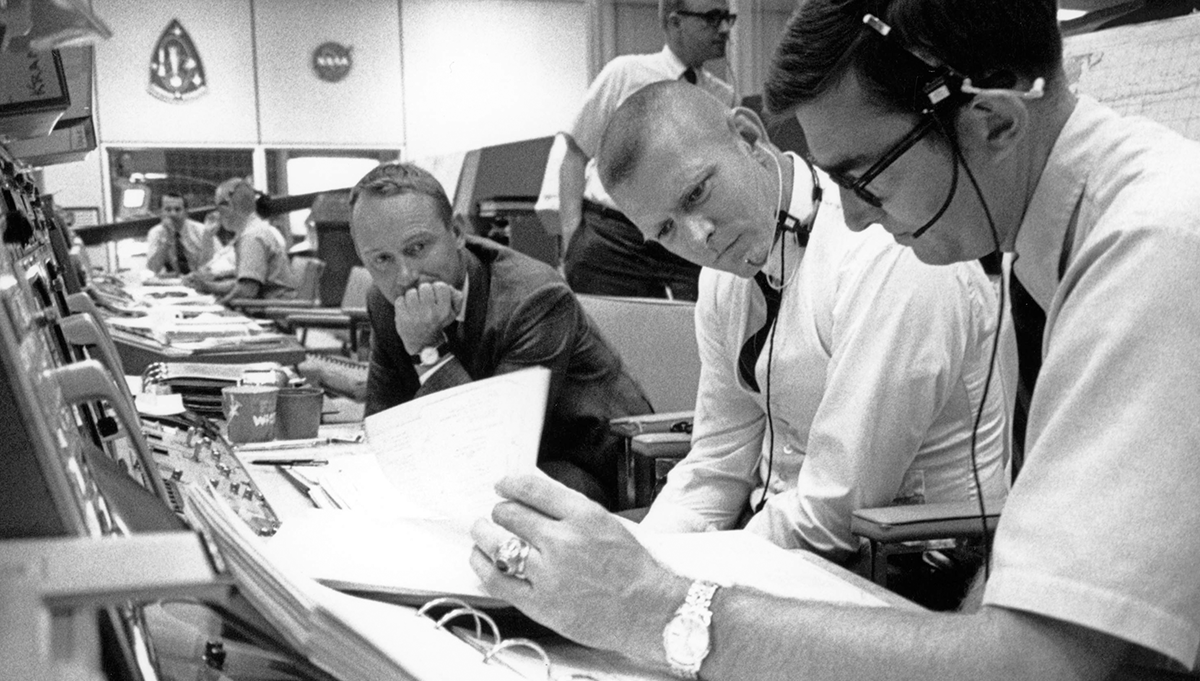
Bill Tindall (left) and Gene Kranz in Mission Control during Apollo 11.

Howard Wilson "Bill" Tindall, Jr. (February 20, 1925 – November 20, 1995) was an American aerospace engineer, NASA engineer and manager. He was an early expert in orbital mechanics and coordinated mission techniques during the Apollo program. In the words of flight director Gene Kranz, Tindall "was pretty much the architect for all of the techniques that we used to go down to the surface of the Moon."

Born in New York City in 1925, Tindall grew up in Scituate, Massachusetts and graduated from Scituate High School in 1943. He enlisted in the Navy and served on destroyers in the Pacific, where he became interested in engineering. Tindall earned a Bachelor of Science degree from Brown University in 1948.

On graduating, Tindall took a job at the Langley Research Center in Hampton, Virginia, which was part of the National Advisory Committee on Aeronautics, a government agency devoted to aeronautical research. Tindall worked on wind tunnel instrumentation.

Tindall's entry into the field of aerospace engineering came when he took a position working on Project Echo, an early communications satellite. He became an expert in the field of orbital mechanics, helping to determine trajectories during Project Mercury and to plan rendezvous techniques during Project Gemini.

During the Apollo program, Tindall was appointed Chief of Apollo Data Priority Coordination. Catherine Osgood, an aerospace engineer who worked with Tindall at NASA, noted that "Bill would just dive into any problem he found, no matter where it was". In practice, Tindall's responsibilities were wide-ranging. He chaired meetings between astronauts, mission controllers, design engineers, contractors, and other relevant parties, adjudicating disagreements and overseeing the details of planning mission techniques.

Tindall was known for the colloquial and entertaining tone of his memos, which were widely referred to as "Tindallgrams." One memo was simply titled "Vent bent descent, lament."

Tindall died November 20, 1995, at the age of 70.
