= Austin Powers: The Spy Who Shagged Me =

1999 film by Jay Roach

- Theatrical release poster
- Directed by: Jay Roach
- Written by: Mike Myers; Michael McCullers
- Based on: Characters by Mike Myers
- Produced by: Suzanne Todd; Jennifer Todd; Demi Moore; Eric McLeod; John Lyons; Mike Myers
- Starring: Mike Myers; Heather Graham; Michael York; Robert Wagner; Seth Green; Elizabeth Hurley
- Cinematography: Ueli Steiger
- Edited by: Debra Neil-Fisher; Jon Poll
- Music by: George S. Clinton
- Production companies: New Line Cinema; Eric's Boy; Moving Pictures; Team Todd
- Distributed by: New Line Cinema
- Release date: June 11, 1999
- Running time: 95 minutes
- Country: United States
- Language: English
- Budget: $33 million
- Box office: $312 million

Austin Powers: The Spy Who Shagged Me is a 1999 American spy comedy film written by Mike Myers and directed by Jay Roach. It is the second installment in the Austin Powers film series, after Austin Powers: International Man of Mystery (1997). It stars Myers as Austin Powers, Dr. Evil, and Fat Bastard, alongside Heather Graham, Michael York, Robert Wagner, Seth Green, Mindy Sterling, Rob Lowe, and Elizabeth Hurley. The plot follows the British spy Austin Powers and the criminal mastermind Dr. Evil as they attempt to defeat each other. The film's title is a play on the title of the James Bond film The Spy Who Loved Me (1977).

The most commercially successful film in the Austin Powers series, The Spy Who Shagged Me grossed $312 million worldwide. Its opening weekend gross surpassed the lifetime gross of the first film. It was nominated at the 72nd Academy Awards for Best Makeup, and was followed by Austin Powers in Goldmember (2002).

== Plot ==
On his honeymoon in 1999, British spy Austin Powers discovers that his wife, Vanessa Kensington, is actually an android "fembot" controlled by Dr. Evil. After Vanessa self-destructs, Austin celebrates that he is single again. Meanwhile, a NATO monitoring facility observes Dr. Evil's return from space. He appears on The Jerry Springer Show, where he reunites with his estranged son, Scott.

At Dr. Evil's Space Needle lair in Seattle, he is presented with a dwarf clone of himself, whom he names Mini-Me. Dr. Evil outlines a plan to time travel back to the late 1960s and render Austin powerless by stealing his "mojo", which Dr. Evil defines as libido or life force. Dr. Evil and Mini-Me travel to 1969, meeting a younger Number Two and Frau Farbissina. Dr. Evil's henchman Fat Bastard extracts Austin's mojo from his frozen body at the Ministry of Defence (MOD). In 1999, British intelligence warns Austin that one of Dr. Evil's agents is after him. The agent, Ivana Humpalot, finds Austin irresistibly attractive and decides not to kill him. While in bed with Ivana, Austin discovers that he has lost his mojo.

The MOD sends Austin to 1969 using a time-traveling Volkswagen New Beetle. He arrives at his London residence, where he evades an assassination attempt by Dr. Evil's operatives with the help of CIA agent Felicity Shagwell. Mustafa, another of Dr. Evil's henchmen, pursues Austin and Felicity, but they manage to subdue him. Mustafa reveals the existence of Dr. Evil's lair, but before he can divulge its location, Mini-Me causes him to fall from a cliff.

Fat Bastard presents Austin's mojo to Dr. Evil, who drinks some of it and then has sex with Frau. Dr. Evil declares his plan to hold the world hostage by threatening to obliterate cities with a massive laser constructed on the Moon. Austin and Felicity get to know each other, but he turns down her offer of sex because of his lack of mojo.

Austin discovers that Fat Bastard stole his mojo. Felicity has sex with Fat Bastard, which enables her to plant a homing device in his anus. After locating the device in a toilet, the MOD finds that Fat Bastard's feces contain traces of a vegetable that only grows on one Caribbean island. Austin and Felicity arrive on the island and are captured, but manage to escape.

Dr. Evil and Mini-Me leave for the Moon to install the giant laser, pursued by Austin and Felicity on the Apollo 11 spaceflight. At Dr. Evil's Moon base, Austin battles Mini-Me, eventually flushing him into space. Austin then confronts Dr. Evil, who has trapped Felicity in a chamber with poison gas. Cornered by Austin, Dr. Evil suggests that Austin use the time machine to save both Felicity and the world. Austin travels ten minutes into the past, meeting up with his past self and accomplishing both objectives. Dr. Evil initiates the self-destruct mechanism of the Moon base and escapes after throwing Austin's mojo into the air. Austin fails to catch it, and it is destroyed. Felicity tells him he still has his mojo, and they escape through the time portal to 1999.

Back at Austin's residence, Fat Bastard attempts to assassinate Austin and Felicity, but they disarm him. In 1969, Dr. Evil recovers Mini-Me from space and vows revenge on Austin.

== Cast ==
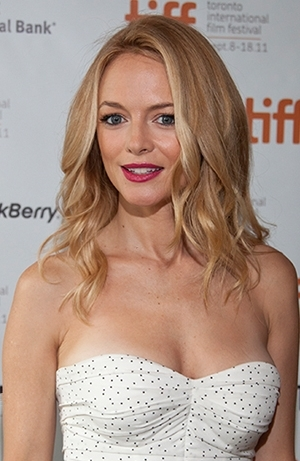
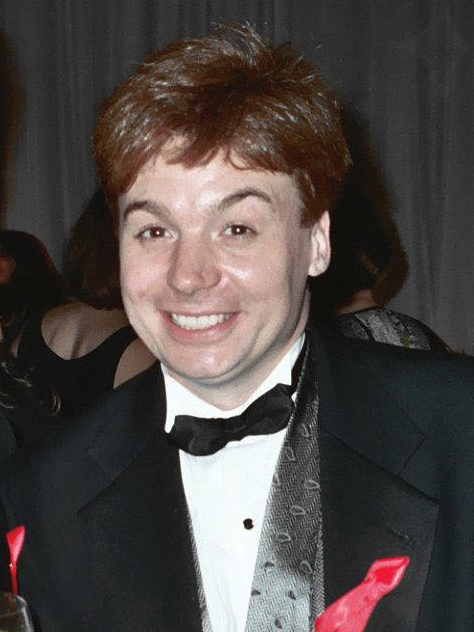
Heather Graham (pictured in 2011) and Mike Myers (1994)
- Mike Myers as Austin Powers, Dr. Evil and Fat Bastard
- Heather Graham as Felicity Shagwell
- Michael York as Basil Exposition
- Robert Wagner as Number Two
  - Rob Lowe as young Number Two
- Seth Green as Scott Evil
- Mindy Sterling as Frau Farbissina
- Verne Troyer as Mini-Me
- Elizabeth Hurley as Vanessa Kensington
- Gia Carides as Robin Spitz-Swallows
- Oliver Muirhead as British colonel
- Clint Howard as Johnson Ritter
- David Koechner as co-pilot
- Kevin Durand as Bazooka Marksman Joe
- Fred Willard as Mission Commander
- Jeff Garlin as Cyclops
- Rachel Wilson as Woody Harrelson fan
- Jennifer Coolidge as woman at football game
- Michael McDonald as NATO soldier
- Steve Wilkos as himself
- Burt Bacharach as himself
- Elvis Costello as himself
- Will Ferrell as Mustafa
- Woody Harrelson as himself
- Kristen Johnston as Ivana Humpalot
- Charles Napier as General Hawk
- Willie Nelson as himself
- Tim Robbins as the president
- Rebecca Romijn-Stamos as herself
- Jerry Springer as himself

== Title ==
Some promotional posters referred to the film as Austin Powers 2. According to the Collins English Dictionary, the use of the word "shag" in the film's title helped to increase the word's acceptability, reducing its shock value and giving it a more jocular, relaxed connotation. Singapore considered changing the title to The Spy Who Shioked Me (shiok derives from the Malay word syok, which means "to feel good").

== Reception ==
=== Box office ===
The Spy Who Shagged Me was a commercial success, opening at the top of the box office and grossing $54.9 million during its first weekend. Opening in 3,315 theaters, the film set a record for the widest release of all time, and achieved the third-highest opening weekend of all time, after Star Wars: Episode I – The Phantom Menace and The Lost World: Jurassic Park. Its opening-weekend total was more than the entire gross of its predecessor. It also set records for the highest June opening and the highest opening for a comedy. (Note: Attributed to multiple references:) The film grossed $206 million in the United States and Canada and $107 million in other countries, for a total of $313 million.

=== Critical response ===
On the review aggregator Rotten Tomatoes, the film has an approval rating of 53% based on 91 reviews, with an average rating of 6/10. The website's critical consensus reads: "Provides lots of laughs with Myers at the helm; as funny or funnier than the original." On Metacritic the film has a weighted average score of 59 out of 100, based on 34 critics, indicating "mixed or average" reviews. Audiences polled by CinemaScore gave the film an average grade of "B+" on an A+ to F scale. Roger Ebert of the Chicago Sun-Times said the film provides "big laughs" but that "too many scenes end on a flat note, like those Saturday Night Live sketches that run out of steam before they end."

== Soundtrack ==
The film's soundtrack has a rating of three out of five stars at AllMusic. It contains the 1999 Madonna song "Beautiful Stranger", which won a Grammy Award in 2000. Mike Myers appears as Austin Powers in the music video, which was directed by Brett Ratner. Another single on the soundtrack, "Word Up!" by Mel B, was released on June 28, 1999. It peaked at number 13 on the UK Singles Chart. Myers (as Dr. Evil) also sings a parody of Will Smith's 1997 song Just the Two of Us, which heavily samples the Grover Washington Jr. song "Just the Two of Us".

Lenny Kravitz performed a cover of the song "American Woman" by The Guess Who for the soundtrack. Kravitz's version reached the top 20 in Australia, Finland, Italy, New Zealand, and Spain, as well as number 26 in Canada and number 49 on the US Billboard Hot 100. Kravitz's version is slower and softer than the original. The music video features Heather Graham; the original political themes of the song were largely replaced by sex appeal. In 1999, Kravitz and his band were joined by The Guess Who for a live performance of "American Woman" at the MuchMusic Video Awards.

== See also ==
- Outline of James Bond
