= Bruce Laird (American football) =

American football player (born 1950)

- Laird in 1977

No. 40, 30
- Positions: Safety, return specialist

Personal information
- Born: May 23, 1950 (age 76); Lowell, Massachusetts, U.S.
- Listed height: 6 ft 0 in (1.83 m)
- Listed weight: 193 lb (88 kg)

Career information
- High school: Scituate (MA)
- College: American International
- NFL draft: 1972: 6th round, 152nd overall pick

Career history
- Baltimore Colts (1972–1981); San Diego Chargers (1982–1983); Arizona Wranglers (1984); Arizona Outlaws (1985)

Awards and highlights
- Pro Bowl (1972); First-team Little All-American (1971)

Career NFL statistics
- Games played: 164
- Starts: 127
- Interceptions: 19
- Fumble recoveries: 18
- Sacks: 4
- Safeties: 1
- Return yards: 4,153
- Stats at Pro Football Reference

Bruce Allan Laird (born May 23, 1950) is an American former professional football player who was a safety and return specialist in the National Football League (NFL) and United States Football League (USFL). He played college football at American International College.

Laird played in the NFL with the Baltimore Colts from 1972 to 1981, then for the San Diego Chargers for two seasons, before moving to the USFL after the 1983 season. Over his 12 year NFL career he started in 127 games, and played in a total of 164 games.

The first half of his career, Laird was a special teams punt and kick returner. Although he never returned one for a touchdown, he accumulated 3,748 yards in 213 attempts, with a career long of 73 yards. His average punt return was 6.6 yards per attempt, and he averaged 24.7 yards per kick return attempt.

== Early life ==
Bruce Allan Laird was born May 23, 1950 in Lowell, Massachusetts. He moved to the coast, and attended Scituate High School where he was a four-sports star.

== College career ==
Laird attended American International College, where he was an All-American his junior and senior years. He graduated with dual degrees in history and political science.

== Later life ==
After Bruce's final season with the NFL, he played in the USFL for the Arizona Wranglers and Arizona Outlaws.

Once retired from the game, Laird remained active with the NFL, as a member of the Board of Directors of "Fourth & Goal", an independent organization for the benefit of retired NFL players.

Laird currently works as a senior marketing executive for a medical practice, Multi-Specialty HealthCare, and resides in the Baltimore metropolitan area, with his second wife, Mary, and his three sons from his first wife. He has also been the NFL's uniform inspector for Baltimore Ravens home games at M&T Bank Stadium since 1998.
