= Scituate High School (Massachusetts) =

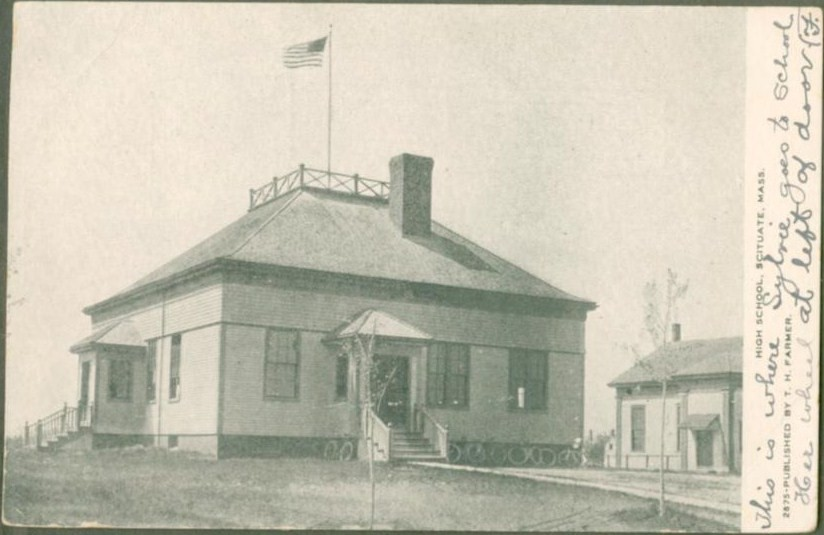
- View of Scituate High School in circa 1905.

Location
- 606 Chief Justice Cushing Highway; Scituate, Massachusetts 02066; United States; 42.200°N 70.769°W

Information
- Type: Public high school
- Established: 1700
- School district: Scituate Public Schools
- Superintendent: Thomas Raab
- Principal: Marc Loranger
- Staff: 60.25 (FTE)
- Grades: 9-12
- Enrollment: 749 (2023–2024)
- Student to teacher ratio: 12.43
- Campus: Suburban
- Colors: Blue and white
- Athletics: Patriot League
- Mascot: Sailor
- Website: shs.scit.org

Scituate High School is a public high school of Scituate, Massachusetts. The school is operated by Scituate Public Schools.

== History ==
Scituate High School was founded in 1700 as Scituate Latin School. Their athletic teams competed in the Patriot League within MIAA Divisions 2, 3, and 4 (football only). In 1984 and 1985, two former students were selected in the NHL entry draft: John Devereaux by the Hartford Whalers in 1985 and Jamie Kelly by the Boston Bruins in 1985. The actor Peter Kastner taught at Scituate High during the 1990-1991 academic year.

== Notable alumni ==
- Jesse Cole, creator of banana ball and commissioner of the Banana Ball Championship League
- Claire Cook, writer
- Casey Dienel, musician
- Bruce Laird (1968), professional football player
- Frank Craig Pandolfe (1976), United States Navy officer
- Bill Tindall (1943), aerospace engineer
- Anna Konkle actor, writer

== See also ==
- List of high schools in Massachusetts
