= Jean-Pierre Augustin =

American boxer

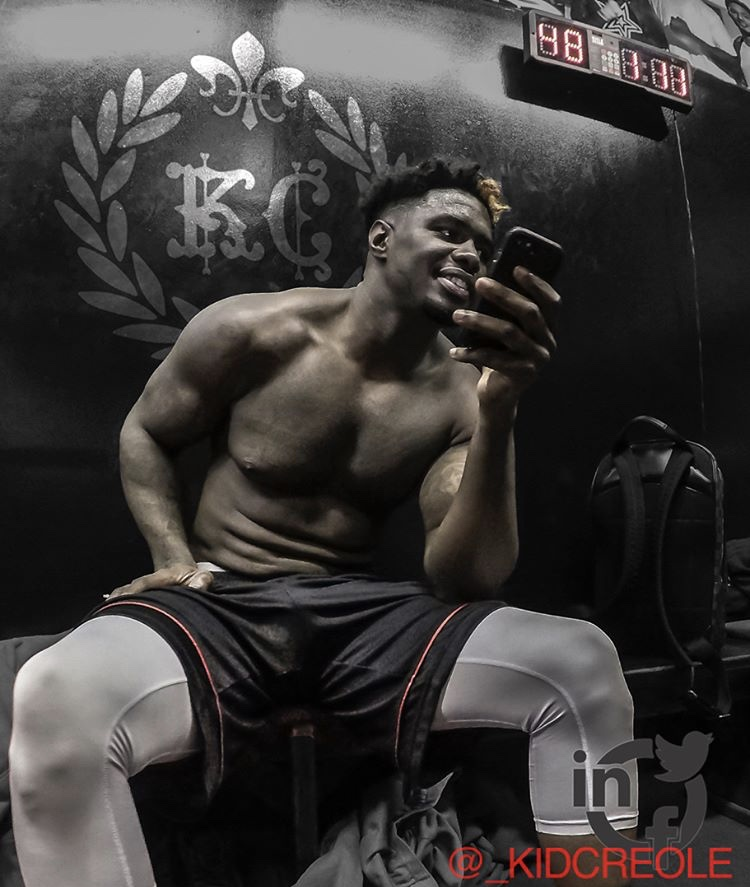

Personal information
- Nickname: Kid Creole
- Nationality: American
- Born: October 1, 1987 Au Cayes, Haiti
- Height: 6 ft 3 1/2 in (1.92 m)
- Weight: Heavyweight

Boxing career
- Stance: Southpaw

Boxing record
- Total fights: 20
- Wins: 18
- Win by KO: 13
- Losses: 1
- Draws: 1

Jean-Pierre Augustin (born October 1, 1987) is a Haitian-American professional boxer.

== Early life ==
Augustin was born in Les Cayes, Haiti. He moved to Boston after birth. He began boxing when he was 12 and had his first bout at 14. His childhood idols were Muhammed Ali, Joe Louis and Jack Johnson.

== Amateur career ==
Augustin's amateur record before he turned professional was 52–12. He boxed as a light heavyweight, 178 pounds. Augustin was also a Pan American team member in 2011 and proceeded to represent Haiti in the 2012 Olympic Trials.

== Professional boxing career ==
Augustin turned professional on Feb 8, 2014, defeating Michael Davis over four rounds at the Serbian American Cultural Center in Weirton, West Virginia. During his professional career, he has held both the WBO-NABO, and IBF North American heavyweight titles and has amassed 18 wins with only 1 loss and 1 draw. Although he is widely listed as fighting out of Louisville, Kentucky, he admitted in an interview that his plan to be based in Louisville did not pan out and in truth, he is actually fighting out of Boston.

== Boxing accomplishments ==
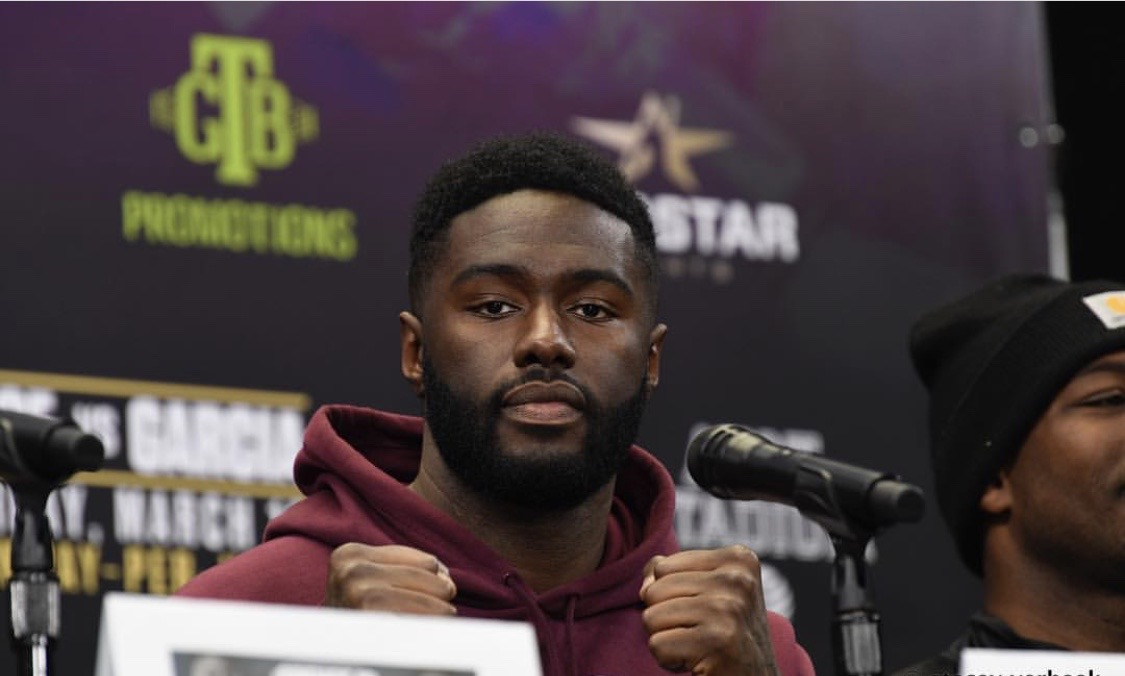
Kid Creole Press Conference

- WBO-NABO, and IBF North American heavyweight titles December 16, 2017
- Professional boxing record 17-1-1, 12 KO’s
- Amateur boxing record 52-12
- 2012 Haitian Olympic Team Member 2012
- 2012 Olympic Continental Qualifier Quarterfinalist 2012
- 2011 Pan American Games Team Member 2011
- 2011 Pan American Games Qualifier Gold Medalist 2011
- 2011 Central American & Caribbean Championship Bronze Medalist 2011
- 2009 State Pal Champion 2009
- 2007 Golden Gloves Regional Champion 2007

== Filmography ==
- Bleed for This (2016) as Gilbert Dele
- Heart, Baby! (2016) as John Tate
- Vault (2019) as an inmate
