= Claire Cook =

American writer and public speaker (born 1955)

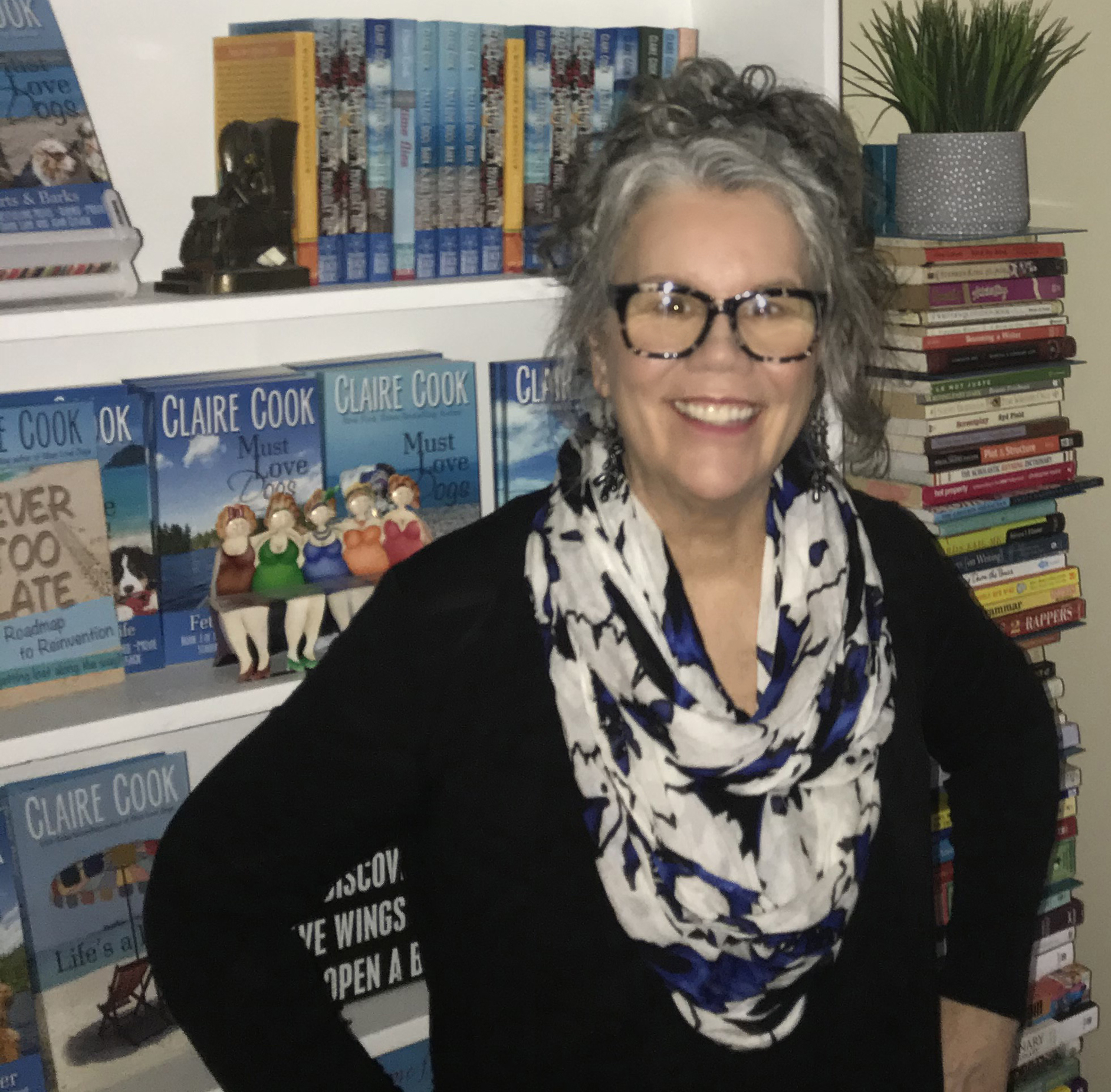
- Claire Cook 2021
- Born: February 14, 1955 (age 71); Alexandria, Virginia, U.S.
- Occupations: Author; speaker; publisher
- Writing career
- Notable work: Must Love Dogs
- Website: www.clairecook.com

Claire Cook (born February 14, 1955) is an American writer and public speaker.

== Career ==
Claire Cook is the New York Times, USA Today and #1 Amazon bestselling author of 21 books with the overarching theme of reinvention for 40-to-forever women. After teaching school for sixteen years, she wrote her first novel (Ready to Fall) in her minivan outside her daughter's swim practice when she was 45 years old. At 50, she walked the red carpet at the Hollywood premiere of the film adaptation of her second novel, Must Love Dogs, which was made into a major motion picture starring Diane Lane and John Cusack. In 2014, she started her own publishing company, Marshbury Beach Books. Cook's first non-fiction book, Never Too Late: Your Roadmap to Reinvention (Without Getting Lost Along the Way), shares her journey and tips for midlife women reinventing their lives. Her books have been translated into 14 languages.

== Education ==
Cook graduated from Scituate High School. She was a Newhouse Scholar at Syracuse University, graduating cum laude with a dual major in Film and Creative Writing. She spent her senior year at Harvard University as a visiting student, where she studied fiction with Robert Stuart Fitzgerald, who translated The Iliad and The Odyssey.

== Personal ==
Cook was born in Alexandria, Virginia to Daniel Joseph Cook and Margaret Lavelle Gibson. Her mother met her father when she taught his Business English class at Worcester Business College after they both finished serving in World War II. Cook's mother died suddenly of sepsis days before Cook's eleventh birthday. Her father worked for The Boston Globe, retiring several years before his death in 1992. Claire Cook is the second oldest, and oldest daughter, of eight siblings.

Cook married Richard (Jake) Jacobucci in 1978. They have two children. Cook and her husband reside in St. Simons Island, GA.

== Bibliography ==
- Ready to Fall (2000)
- Must Love Dogs (#1) (2002)
- Multiple Choice (2004)
- Life's A Beach (2007)
- Summer Blowout (2008)
- The Wildwater Walking Club (2009)
- Seven Year Switch (2010)
- Best Staged Plans (2011)
- Wallflower in Bloom (2012)
- Time Flies (2013)
- Must Love Dogs: New Leash on Life (#2) (2014)
- Never Too Late: Your Roadmap to Reinvention (2014)
- Must Love Dogs: Fetch You Later (#3) (2014)
- Must Love Dogs: Bark & Roll Forever (#4) (2015)
- Shine On: How to Grow Awesome Instead of Old (2015)
- Must Love Dogs: Who Let the Cats In? (#5) (2016)
- The Wildwater Walking Club: Back on Track: Book 2 of The Wildwater Walking Club series (Volume 2) (2017)
- Must Love Dogs: A Howliday Tail (#6) (2017)
- Must Love Dogs: Hearts & Barks (#7) (2019)
- The Wildwater Walking Club: Step by Step: Book 3 of The Wildwater Walking Club series (Volume 3) (2020)
- Life Glows On (2021)
- Must Love Dogs: Lucky Enough (#8) (2022)
- The Wildwater Walking Club: Walk the Talk: Book 4 of The Wildwater Walking Club series (Volume 4) (2022)
- Bonus Time (2023)
- Bonus Time: Still Got It: Book 2 of the Bonus Time series (Volume 2) (2025)

== Speaking engagements ==
- Amelia Island Book Festival
- Atlanta Writers Conference
- California Women's Conference
- Cape Cod Writers Conference
- Decatur Book Festival
- Denmark Literary Festival
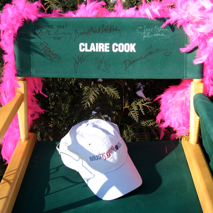
- Dress for Success International Conference
- Emory University
- Massachusetts Women's Conference
- Missouri Writers Guild Conference
- Pennsylvania Women's Conference
- Savannah Book Festival
- South Carolina Book Festival
- South County Hospital's 9th Annual Women's Wellness Day
- Tennessee Williams Literary Festival
- University of Connecticut
