= Jennifer Todd =

American film producer

- Born: October 3, 1969 (age 56); Los Angeles, California, U.S.
- Occupation: Film producer
- Years active: 1995–present
- Title: President of Pearl Street Films
- Spouse: Chris Messina
- Children: 2
- Relatives: Suzanne Todd (sister)

Jennifer Todd (born October 3, 1969) is an American film and television producer. She has a first look film deal at MGM Studios and is partnered with Thomas Kail in an exclusive television deal with 20th Television. She co-produced the 89th and 90th Academy Awards with Michael De Luca. She was nominated for an Emmy for producing both shows. She previously served as President of Pearl Street Films, the production company of actors Ben Affleck and Matt Damon.

== Life and career ==
Todd was born in Los Angeles, California. Her credits include the three Austin Powers films, Boiler Room, Prime, Must Love Dogs, and Memento, for which she won an Independent Spirit Award for producing. Jennifer has produced alongside her sister, Suzanne Todd, also a producer. She produces the Showtime series "City on a Hill" starring Kevin Bacon and Aldis Hodge which aired its second season in 2021. She also produced "The Way Back" for WB starring Ben Affleck that was released in 2020.

Todd also produced Across the Universe, starring Evan Rachel Wood and Jim Sturgess and directed by Julie Taymor, as well as The Accidental Husband, directed by Griffin Dunne, starring Uma Thurman, Colin Firth, and Jeffrey Dean Morgan. She produced (with Richard D. Zanuck) the 2010 film Alice in Wonderland, starring Helena Bonham Carter, Anne Hathaway, Mia Wasikowska and Johnny Depp and directed by Tim Burton.

Todd is a member of the Academy of Motion Picture Arts and Sciences, as well as the Academy of Television Arts and Sciences. In 2018 she was elected to the Board of Governors as a Governor for the Producers Branch.

== Awards ==
89th Oscars nominated for Emmy, Outstanding Special Class Program

90th Oscars nominated for Emmy, Outstanding Special Class Program

If These Walls Could Talk 2, cast and creators awarded the Women in Film Lucy Award in recognition of excellence and innovation in a creative work that have enhanced the perception of women through the medium of television.

Memento, nominated for two Academy Awards in 2002; won three Independent Spirit Awards including Best Feature.

Across the Universe, nominated for a 2008 Academy Award (Best Costume Design); nominated for a Golden Globe (Best Motion Picture – Musical or Comedy)

== Personal life ==
Todd has two sons with her husband, actor Chris Messina.

== Filmography ==
She was a producer in all films unless otherwise noted.

=== Film ===
Year	Film	Credit
1995	Now and Then	Executive producer
1997	Austin Powers: International Man of Mystery	
1999	Idle Hands	
1999	Austin Powers: The Spy Who Shagged Me	
2000	Boiler Room	
2000	Memento	
2002	Austin Powers in Goldmember	
2005	Must Love Dogs	
2005	Prime	
2006	Zoom	
2007	Across the Universe	
2008	The Accidental Husband	
2010	The Romantics	
2010	Alice in Wonderland	
2012	Celeste and Jesse Forever	
2013	The To Do List	
2014	Learning to Drive	Executive producer
2016	Alice Through the Looking Glass	
2016	Jason Bourne	Executive producer
2016	Live by Night	
2020	The Way Back	
2021	Come from Away	
2025	The Thursday Murder Club	

Miscellaneous crew

Year	Film	Role
1988	Lucky Stiff	Assistant to director
1989	Lethal Weapon 2	Assistant: Joel Silver
1990	Die Hard 2	Assistant: Joel Silver
1990	The Adventures of Ford Fairlane	Assistant: Joel Silver

Thanks

Year	Film	Role
2010	Monogamy	Special thanks
2014	Alex of Venice	Special thanks

=== Television ===
Year	Title	Credit	Notes
2000	If These Walls Could Talk 2	Executive producer	Television film
2015	Project Greenlight	Executive producer	Documentary
2015	The Leisure Class	Executive producer	Television film
2016−17	Incorporated	Executive producer	
2017	89th Academy Awards		Television special
2018	90th Academy Awards		Television special
2019−22	City on a Hill	Executive producer	
2023	Up Here	Executive producer	
2024	We Were the Lucky Ones	Executive producer	

Miscellaneous crew

Year	Title	Role
1989−92	Tales from the Crypt	Assistant: Joel Silver
