= Kevin Cooney =

Kevin Cooney may refer to:

- Kevin Cooney (baseball), American baseball player
- Kevin Cooney (hurler), Irish hurler
