= Suzanne Todd =

American film producer

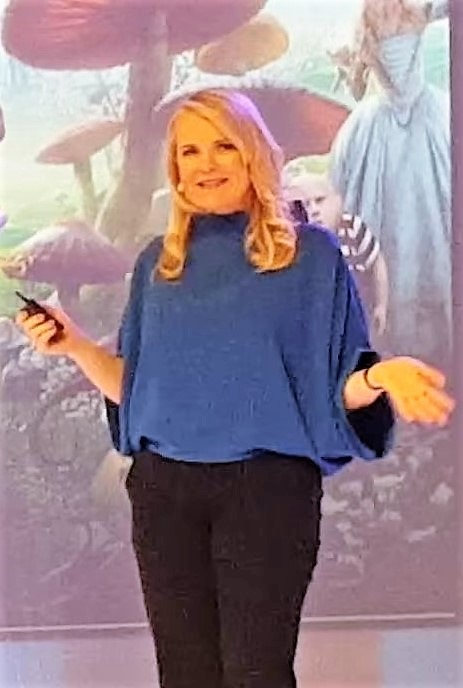
- Todd discussing her film Alice Through the Looking Glass in 2016
- Born: June 1, 1965 (age 61); Sherman Oaks, California, U.S.
- Education: University of Southern California
- Occupation: Producer
- Years active: 1988–present
- Children: 3
- Relatives: Jennifer Todd (sister); Chris Messina (brother-in-law)
- Website: suzannetodd.com

Suzanne Todd (born June 1, 1965) is an American film and television producer, and the owner of the film production company Team Todd.

== Career ==
Todd graduated from the USC's School of Cinematic Arts with a degree in Film Production.

In 1994, Suzanne Todd partnered with Demi Moore to create the production company Moving Pictures. During their five-year collaboration, they produced several films, including the television movie If These Walls Could Talk. Todd received a Golden Globe nomination and two Emmy Award nominations for Outstanding Made for Television as well as the Governor's Award.

In 1999, Todd executive produced HBO's If These Walls Could Talk 2, starring Vanessa Redgrave, Ellen DeGeneres, and Sharon Stone. The film received a nomination for the 2000 Emmy Award for Outstanding Made for Television Movie and a 2001 PGA Golden Laurel Award nomination for Producer of the Year in Longform TV.

Todd is a member of the Academy of Motion Picture Arts and Sciences, Academy of Television Arts and Sciences, the Producers Guild of America, and the Directors Guild of America.

Starting in 2010, Todd spent three years as a creative and business consultant for Activision/Blizzard.

=== Team Todd ===
Todd cofounded the production company Team Todd with her sister, Jennifer Todd, in 1997.

Team Todd produced The Austin Powers trilogy, which grossed over $500 million worldwide. The first film, Austin Powers: International Man of Mystery, starring Mike Myers and Elizabeth Hurley, was released in 1997 and grossed $67 million worldwide. Its 1999 sequel, Austin Powers: The Spy Who Shagged Me, grossed $310 million worldwide and won a Grammy Award for Best Song Written for a Motion Picture, two MTV Movie Awards, and a Teen Choice Award. Nominations included the Academy Award for Best Makeup, a Golden Globe for Best Original Song, a Grammy for Best Soundtrack Album and an MTV Award for Best Movie. The third instalment, Austin Powers in Goldmember, featuring Beyoncé Knowles, grossed $289 million worldwide and won a Kids' Choice Award for Favorite Movie, the MTV Award for Best Comedic Performance and a BMI Film Music Award.

In 2002, Team Todd produced the independent film Memento, which received MTV's Best New Filmmaker Award and the Independent Spirit Awards for Best Feature.

In 2008, Team Todd produced the musical Across The Universe, directed by Julie Taymor and starring Evan Rachel Wood; the film received a Golden Globe Awards nomination for Best Picture and an Academy Award nomination in the Best Costume category.Galt Niederhoffer's directorial debut, The Romantics, which premiered at the 2010 Sundance Film Festival,

In 2012, Team Todd produced the romantic comedy Celeste and Jesse Forever, starring Rashida Jones and Andy Samberg. The film premiered at the 2012 Sundance Film Festival, and was later acquired by Sony Pictures Classics.

Team Todd's other credits include Disney's Alice in Wonderland (2010), directed by Tim Burton, The Accidental Husband, Prime, Must Love Dogs, and Boiler Room. Boiler Room was nominated for Best First Feature at the 2001 Independent Spirit Awards. Most recently, she had signed a first look deal with MGM Television.

== Filmography ==
Associate producer

- Tales from the Crypt (1989−92)
- Die Hard 2 (1990)
- The Adventures of Ford Fairlane (1990)
- Predator 2 (1990)
- Parker Kane (1990)
- Hudson Hawk (1991)

Producer

- Ricochet (1991) (Co-producer)
- Live Wire (1992)
- Loaded Weapon 1 (1993)
- Mighty Morphin Power Rangers: The Movie (1995)
- Now and Then (1995)
- Austin Powers: International Man of Mystery (1997)
- G.I. Jane (1997)
- Idle Hands (1999)
- Austin Powers: The Spy Who Shagged Me (1999)
- Boiler Room (2000)
- Memento (2000)
- Austin Powers in Goldmember (2002)
- Must Love Dogs (2005)
- Prime (2005)
- Zoom (2006)
- Across the Universe (2007)
- The Accidental Husband (2008)
- The Romantics (2010)
- Alice in Wonderland (2010)
- Celeste and Jesse Forever (2012)
- Alice Through the Looking Glass (2016)
- Bad Moms (2016)
- A Bad Moms Christmas (2017)
- Jexi (2019)
- Noelle (2019)
- Magic Camp (2020)
- Spa Weekend (2026)

Executive producer

- If These Walls Could Talk (1996)
- If These Walls Could Talk 2 (2000)
- Candy Coated Christmas (2021)
- The Naughty Nine (2023)
- Descendants: The Rise of Red (2024)
- Descendants: Wicked Wonderland (2026)

== Awards ==
Award	Name	Result	Film	Year
Golden Globe Awards	Golden Globe Award for Best Picture	Nominated	Across the Universe	2008
American Film Institute Awards	AFI Movie of the Year	Nominated	Memento	2002
Independent Spirit Awards	Best Film	Won	Memento	2002
Independent Spirit Awards	Best First Feature	Nominated	Boiler Room	2001
Primetime Emmy Awards	Outstanding Made for Television Movie	Nominated	If These Walls Could Talk 2	2000
Women in Film Lucy Awards	Lucy Award	Won		2000
Primetime Emmy Awards	Outstanding Made for Television Movie	Nominated	If These Walls Could Talk	1997
