= Memento (film) =

2000 film by Christopher Nolan

- Theatrical release poster
- Directed by: Christopher Nolan
- Screenplay by: Christopher Nolan
- Based on: "Memento Mori" by Jonathan Nolan
- Produced by: Suzanne Todd; Jennifer Todd
- Starring: Guy Pearce; Carrie-Anne Moss; Joe Pantoliano
- Cinematography: Wally Pfister
- Edited by: Dody Dorn
- Music by: David Julyan
- Production companies: Summit Entertainment; Team Todd
- Distributed by: Newmarket
- Release dates: September 5, 2000 (Venice); March 16, 2001 (United States)
- Running time: 113 minutes
- Country: United States
- Language: English
- Budget: $5–9 million
- Box office: $43.3 million

Memento is a 2000 American neo-noir psychological thriller film written and directed by Christopher Nolan, based on the 2001 short story "Memento Mori" by his brother, Jonathan Nolan. Starring Guy Pearce, Carrie-Anne Moss, and Joe Pantoliano, the film follows Leonard Shelby (Pearce), a man who has anterograde amnesia, resulting in the inability to form new long-term memories. He uses an elaborate system of photos, notes, and tattoos in an attempt to uncover the perpetrator who killed his wife and caused him to sustain the condition.

The film's non-linear narrative is presented as two different sequences of scenes interspersed during the film: a series in black-and-white that is shown chronologically, and a series of color sequences shown in reverse order (simulating for the audience the mental state of the protagonist). The two sequences meet at the end of the film, producing one complete and cohesive narrative.

Memento premiered in the Cinema del Presente section at the 57th Venice International Film Festival on September 5, 2000, and was theatrically released in the United States on March 16, 2001. The film was highly acclaimed by critics, who praised the performances of the cast, its nonlinear structure, and themes of memory, perception, grief, and self-deception. It was also a commercial success, grossing $43 million against its $5–9 million production budget and gained a cult following. Memento received numerous accolades, including the Waldo Salt Screenwriting Award and a nomination for the Grand Jury Prize at the Sundance Film Festival, and was nominated for Best Original Screenplay and Best Film Editing at the 74th Academy Awards. In 2017, the United States Library of Congress deemed the film "culturally, historically, or aesthetically significant" and selected it for preservation in the National Film Registry.

== Plot ==
The film opens with a sequence, played in reverse, where a man fatally shoots another in the head and takes a Polaroid photo of the dead man. The film continues as a non-linear narrative presented as an alternating series of black-and-white and color scenes.

The black-and-white scenes begin with former insurance investigator Leonard Shelby in a motel room speaking to an unknown caller. As a result of an attack by two men, Leonard has anterograde amnesia and is unable to store recent memories. He explains that he killed the attacker who raped and strangled his wife Catherine, but a second clubbed him and escaped. The police did not accept that there was a second attacker, but Leonard believes the attacker's name is "John G" or "James G". Leonard investigates using an elaborate system of notes, Polaroid photos, and tattoos to keep track of the information he discovers.

Leonard recalls Sammy Jankis, another anterograde amnesiac, from his insurance industry days. After tests demonstrated Sammy's inability to learn tasks through repetition, Leonard believed that his condition was at best psychological and denied his insurance claim. Sammy's distraught wife repeatedly asked Sammy to administer her insulin shots for her diabetes, hoping he would remember having given her a shot. However, Sammy administered each injection, giving her a fatal overdose.

The color scenes are presented in reverse order. In the story's chronology, Leonard self-directively gets a tattoo of John G's license plate number. Finding a note in his clothes, he meets Natalie, a bartender who initially mistakes him for her boyfriend Jimmy Grantz, whom she expects to meet. After offering to help Leonard, she provokes him into assaulting her and exploits his condition by blaming her bruises on Jimmy's associate Dodd. She explains that Dodd has been aggressively pestering her for money that Jimmy took to a meeting he never returned from. Leonard volunteers to confront Dodd and Natalie provides him with Dodd's address.

Dodd finds Leonard driving and questions him about his car, but Leonard escapes after Dodd attempts to shoot him. Leonard ambushes Dodd in the latter's hotel room and calls his contact Teddy, who helps drive Dodd out of town at gunpoint. Teddy advises Leonard not to trust Natalie, but Leonard finds a note warning himself not to trust Teddy. Feeling pity for Leonard, Natalie returns his favor by running John G's license plate through a database and provides him with the driver's license for a John Edward Gammell, Teddy's full name. Confirming his information on "John G" and his warnings, Leonard drives Teddy to an abandoned warehouse, leading to the opening sequence where he fatally shoots him.

In the final black-and-white scene, prompted by the caller, Leonard meets with Teddy, an undercover cop who has found "John G", Jimmy, and directs Leonard to the abandoned warehouse. When Jimmy arrives, Leonard strangles him and takes a Polaroid photo of the body. As the photo develops, the black-and-white transitions to the final (chronologically earliest) color scene. Leonard swaps clothes with Jimmy before hearing him whisper "Sammy".

Suddenly doubting Jimmy's role in his wife's murder, Leonard confronts Teddy when the latter arrives. Teddy explains that he helped Leonard kill the real attacker a year ago, which Leonard has no memory of. Since then, Teddy has cyclically exploited Leonard's condition and search for "John G" to bust drug deals and profit off them. Teddy reveals that Leonard's wife survived the assault and was diabetic. It was actually Leonard who overdosed his wife, and he had repressed the memory into Sammy's story to escape his guilt.

After hearing Teddy confess, Leonard burns the photograph of the dead Jimmy and the photo Teddy handed him that documented his successful revenge from a year ago. In a monologue, Leonard explains that he is willing to lie to himself to be happy and believe that his actions are meaningful. He targets Teddy, who revealed that he too has a "John G" name, by ordering a tattoo of Teddy's license plate number and writing a note that Teddy cannot be trusted. Leonard drives off in Jimmy's car to a tattoo parlor.

== Cast ==
- Guy Pearce as Leonard Shelby
- Carrie-Anne Moss as Natalie
- Joe Pantoliano as John Edward "Teddy" Gammell
- Mark Boone Junior as Burt
- Russ Fega as Waiter
- Jorja Fox as Catherine Shelby
- Stephen Tobolowsky as Sammy Jankis
- Harriet Sansom Harris as Mrs. Jankis
- Thomas Lennon as Doctor
- Callum Keith Rennie as Dodd
- Kimberly Campbell as Blonde
- Marianne Muellerleile as Tattooist
- Larry Holden as Jimmy Grantz

== Film structure ==
A diagram depicting the structure of Memento

The film is structured with two timelines: color sequences are alternated with black-and-white sequences. The latter are put together in chronological order. The color ones are ordered in reverse. Chronologically, the black-and-white sequences come first, the color sequences come next.

Using the numbering scheme suggested by Andy Klein—who took numbers from 1 to 22 for the black-and-white sequences and letters A–V for the color ones in his article for Salon magazine—the plotting of the film as presented is: Opening credits (shown in reverse), 1, V, 2, U, 3, T, 4, S, ..., 22/A, credits.

There is a smooth transition from the black-and-white sequence 22 to color sequence A, which occurs during the development of a Polaroid photograph.

The chronological order of the story can be viewed as a "hidden feature" on the 2-Disc Limited Edition Region 1 DVD and the 3-Disc special Edition Region 2 DVD. In this special feature, the chapters of the film are put together into the chronological order and is shown: Ending Credits (run in reverse), 1, 2, 3, ..., 22/A, B, ..., V, then the opening title runs "backward" to what was shown (the opening title sequence is run in reverse during the actual film, so it is shown forward in this version).

Stefano Ghislotti wrote an article in Film Anthology which discusses how Nolan provides the viewer with the clues necessary to decode the plot as we watch and help us understand the chronology. The color sequences include a brief overlap to help clue the audience into the fact that they are being presented in reverse order. The purpose of the fragmented reverse sequencing is to force the audience into a sympathetic experience of Leonard's defective ability to create new long-term memories, where prior events are not recalled, since the audience has yet to see them.

== Production ==
=== Development ===
In July 1996, brothers Christopher and Jonathan Nolan took a cross-country road trip from Chicago to Los Angeles, as Christopher was relocating to the American West Coast. During the drive, Jonathan pitched the story for the film to his brother, who responded enthusiastically to the idea. After they arrived in Los Angeles, Jonathan left for Washington, D.C. to finish college at Georgetown University. The mysterious killer character known only as "John G." was actually an homage to Jonathan's Georgetown University screenwriting professor at the time, John Glavin. Christopher repeatedly asked Jonathan to send him a first draft, and after a few months, Jonathan complied. Two months later, Christopher came up with the idea to tell the film backwards, and began to work on the screenplay. Jonathan wrote the short story simultaneously, and the brothers continued to correspond, sending each other subsequent revisions of their respective works. Christopher initially wrote the script as a linear story, and then would "go back and reorder it the way it is on screen to check the logic of it." Nolan was also influenced by the short story "Funes the Memorious" by Jorge Luis Borges. "I think Memento is a strange cousin to 'Funes the Memorious'—about a man who remembers everything, who can't forget anything. It's a bit of an inversion of that."

Jonathan's short story, titled "Memento Mori", is radically different from Christopher's film, although it maintains the same essential elements. In Jonathan's version, Leonard is instead named Earl and is a patient at a mental institution. As in the film, his wife was killed by an anonymous man, and during the attack on his wife, Earl lost his ability to create new long-term memories. Like Leonard, Earl leaves notes to himself and has tattoos with information about the killer. However, in the short story, Earl convinces himself through his own written notes to escape the mental institution and murder his wife's killer. Unlike the film, there is no ambiguity that Earl finds and kills the anonymous man.

In July 1997, Christopher Nolan's girlfriend (later wife) Emma Thomas showed his screenplay to Aaron Ryder, an executive for Newmarket Films. Ryder said the script was, "perhaps the most innovative script I had ever seen", and soon after, it was optioned by Newmarket and given a budget of $4.5 million. Pre-production lasted seven weeks, during which the main shooting location changed from Montreal, Quebec to Los Angeles, California, to create a more realistic and noirish atmosphere for the film.

=== Casting ===
Brad Pitt was initially slated to play Leonard. Pitt was interested in the part, but passed due to scheduling conflicts. Other considered actors included Charlie Sheen, Alec Baldwin, Aaron Eckhart (who later worked with Nolan on The Dark Knight), and Thomas Jane, but the role went to Guy Pearce, who impressed Nolan the most. Pearce was chosen partly for his "lack of celebrity" (after Pitt passed, they "decided to eschew the pursuit of A-list stars and make the film for less money by using an affordable quality actor") and his enthusiasm for the role, evidenced by a personal phone call Pearce made to Nolan to discuss the part.

After being impressed by Carrie-Anne Moss's performance as Trinity in the 1999 science fiction film The Matrix, Jennifer Todd suggested her for the part of Natalie. While Mary McCormack lobbied for the role, Nolan decided to cast Moss as Natalie, saying, "She added an enormous amount to the role of Natalie that wasn't on the page". For the corrupt police officer Teddy, "comedian Denis Leary was mentioned, though proved unavailable". Moss suggested her co-star from The Matrix, Joe Pantoliano. Although there was a concern that Pantoliano might be too villainous for the part, he was still cast and Nolan said he was surprised by the actor's subtlety in his performance.

The rest of the film's characters were quickly cast after the three main leads were established. Stephen Tobolowsky and Harriet Sansom Harris play Sammy Jankis and his wife, respectively. Mark Boone Junior landed the role of Burt, the motel clerk, because Jennifer Todd liked his "look and attitude" for the part (as a result he has re-appeared in minor roles in other productions by Nolan). Tobolowsky said that he took the role of Sammy Jankis as he liked the script and also he knew the role was perfect for him as he had suffered from amnesia in real life.

=== Filming ===
Filming took place from September 7 to October 8, 1999, a 25-day shooting schedule. Pearce was on set every day during filming, although all three principal actors (including Pantoliano and Moss) performed together only on the first day, shooting exterior sequences outside Natalie's house. All of Moss' scenes were completed in the first week, including follow-up scenes at Natalie's home, Ferdy's bar, and the restaurant where she meets Leonard for the final time.

Pantoliano returned to the set late in the second week to continue filming his scenes. On September 25, the crew shot the opening scene in which Leonard kills Teddy. Although the scene is in reverse motion, Nolan used forward-played sounds. For a shot of a shell casing flying upwards, the shell had to be dropped in front of the camera in forward motion, but it constantly rolled out of frame. Nolan was forced to blow the casing out of frame instead, but in the confusion, the crew shot it backwards. They then had to make an optical (a copy of the shot) and reverse the shot to make it go forward again. "That was the height of complexity in terms of the film", Nolan said. "An optical to make a backwards running shot forwards, and the forwards shot is a simulation of a backwards shot."

The next day, on September 26, Larry Holden returned to shoot the sequence where Leonard attacks Jimmy. After filming was completed five days later, Pearce's voice-overs were recorded. For the black-and-white scenes, Pearce was given free rein to improvise his narrative, allowing for a documentary feel.

The Travel Inn in Tujunga, California, was repainted and used as the interior of Leonard's and Dodd's motel rooms and the exterior of the film's Discount Inn. Scenes in Sammy Jankis' house were shot in a suburban home close to Pasadena, while Natalie's house was located in Burbank. The crew planned to shoot the derelict building set (where Leonard kills Teddy and Jimmy) in a Spanish-styled brick building owned by a train company. However, one week before shooting began, the company placed several dozen train carriages outside the building, making the exterior unfilmable. Since the interior of the building had already been built as a set, a new location had to be found. An oil refinery near Long Beach was used instead, and the scene where Leonard burns his wife's possessions was filmed on the other side of the refinery.

=== Music ===
David Julyan composed the film's synthesized score. Julyan acknowledges several synthesized soundtracks that inspired him, such as Vangelis's Blade Runner and Hans Zimmer's The Thin Red Line. While composing the score, Julyan created different, distinct sounds to differentiate between the color and black-and-white scenes: "brooding and classical" themes in the former, and "oppressive and rumbly noise" in the latter. Since he describes the entire score as "Leonard's theme", Julyan says, "The emotion I was aiming at with my music was yearning and loss. But a sense of loss you feel but at the same time you don't know what it is you have lost, a sense of being adrift."

Initially, Nolan wanted to use Radiohead's "Paranoid Android" during the end credits, but he was unable to secure the rights. Instead, David Bowie's "Something in the Air" is used, although another of Radiohead's songs, an extended version of "Treefingers", is included on the film's soundtrack.

== Release ==
The film gained substantial word-of-mouth press from the film festival circuit. It premiered at the 2000 Venice Film Festival, where it received a standing ovation, and afterwards played at Deauville American Film Festival and the Toronto International Film Festival. With the publicity from these events, Memento did not have trouble finding foreign distributors, opening in more than 20 countries worldwide. Its promotion tour ended at the Sundance Film Festival, where it played in January 2001.

Finding American distributors proved more troublesome. Memento was screened for various studio heads (including Miramax chief Harvey Weinstein) in March 2000. Although most of the executives loved the film and praised Nolan's talent, all passed on distributing the picture, believing it was too confusing and would not attract a large audience. After famed independent film director Steven Soderbergh saw the film and learned it was not being distributed, he championed the film in interviews and public events, giving it even more publicity, although he did not secure a distributor. Newmarket, in a financially risky move, decided to distribute the film itself.

After the first few weeks of distribution, Memento had reached more than 500 theaters and earned a domestic total of $25 million in its box-office run. The film's success was surprising to those who passed on the film, so much so that Weinstein realized his mistake and tried to buy the film from Newmarket.

=== Marketing ===
Jonathan Nolan designed the film's official website. As with the marketing strategy of The Blair Witch Project, the website was intended to provide further clues and hints to introduce the story, while not providing any concrete information. After a short intro on the website, the viewer is shown a newspaper clipping detailing Leonard's murder of Teddy. Clicking on highlighted words in the article leads to more material describing the film, including Leonard's notes and photographs as well as police reports. The filmmakers employed another tactic by sending out Polaroid pictures to random people, depicting a bloody and shirtless Leonard pointing at an unmarked spot on his chest. Since Newmarket distributed the film, Christopher Nolan edited the film's trailers. Sold to inexpensive cable channels like Bravo and A&E, and websites such as Yahoo and MSN, the trailers were key to the film gaining widespread public notice.

=== Home media ===
The Special Edition DVD's menus are arranged as items in a psychological test. Highlighting certain objects leads to special features.

Memento was released on DVD and VHS in the United States and Canada on September 4, 2001, and in the United Kingdom on January 14, 2002. The UK edition contains a hidden feature that allows the viewer to watch the film in chronological order. The Canadian version does not have this feature but the film chapters are set up to do this manually or through DVD programming. The original US release does not have the chronological feature nor are the chapters set up correctly to do it.

The film was re-released in a limited edition DVD that features an audio commentary by Christopher Nolan, with four different endings; the original short story by Jonathan Nolan on which the film was based; and an episode of the Sundance Channel series Anatomy of a Scene documenting the making of the film. The limited edition DVD also contains a hidden feature that allows the viewer to watch the film in chronological order.

The Limited Edition DVD is packaged to look like Leonard's case file from a mental institution, with notes scribbled by "doctors" and Leonard on the inside. The DVD menus are designed as a series of psychological tests; the viewer has to choose certain words, objects, and multiple choice answers to play the movie or access special features. Leonard's "notes" on the DVD case offer clues to navigating the DVD. Some of the "materials" seem designed to induce paranoia and uncertainty (a picture of one person whispering to another is captioned, "They know what you did"), alluding to Shelby's mental state.

Memento was re-released in the UK on a 3-disc Special Edition DVD on December 27, 2004. This release contains all the special features that are on the two US releases in one package plus a couple of new interviews. The menus appear as tattoos on Leonard's body and are more straightforward than the US 2-disc limited edition DVD.

Memento was released on Blu-ray on August 15, 2006. This release lacks the special features contained on the Limited Edition DVD, but does include the audio commentary by director Christopher Nolan. The single-layer disc features an MPEG-2 1080p transfer and PCM 5.1 surround audio. The film was also released on iTunes as a digital download.

The film was re-released on the Blu-ray and DVD in the US on February 22, 2011, by Lionsgate following the 10th anniversary of the film. Both the Blu-ray and DVD have a new transfer that was also shown in theaters. Aside from the transfer, the Blu-ray contains a new special featurette by Nolan on the film's legacy.

A 4K Blu-ray release for the film is set for January 27, 2027; the film will be restored by Australian film distributor Umbrella. Memento will be the first of Nolan's films to receive a director-approved Dolby Vision HDR for a physical release.

== Reception ==
=== Box office ===
Memento was a box office success. In the United States, during its opening weekend, it was released in only 11 theaters, but by week 11 it was distributed to more than 500 theaters. It grossed over $25 million in North America and over $17 million in other countries, combining for a total worldwide gross of over $43 million. During its theatrical run, it did not place higher than eighth in the list of highest-grossing movies for a single weekend.

=== Critical response ===
Memento was met with critical acclaim. On review aggregator Rotten Tomatoes, the film received an approval rating of 94% based on 186 reviews, with an average rating of 8.8/10. The site's critical consensus reads, "Christopher Nolan skillfully guides the audience through Memento's fractured narrative, seeping his film in existential dread." On Metacritic, the film has a weighted average score of 83 out of 100 based on 34 critics, indicating "universal acclaim".

Film critic James Berardinelli gave the film four out of four stars, ranking it number one on his year-end Top Ten list and number sixty-three on his All-Time Top 100 films. In his review, he called it an "endlessly fascinating, wonderfully open-ended motion picture [that] will be remembered by many who see it as one of the best films of the year". Berardinelli praised the film's backwards narrative, saying that "what really distinguishes this film is its brilliant, innovative structure", and noted that Guy Pearce gives an "astounding ... tight, and thoroughly convincing performance". In 2009, Berardinelli chose Memento as his #3 best movie of the decade. William Arnold of the Seattle Post-Intelligencer writes that Memento is a "delicious one-time treat", and emphasizes that director Christopher Nolan "not only makes Memento work as a non-linear puzzle film, but as a tense, atmospheric thriller". Rob Blackwelder noted that "Nolan has a crackerjack command over the intricacies of this story. He makes every single element of the film a clue to the larger picture ... as the story edges back toward the origins of [Leonard's] quest".

Not all critics were impressed with the film's structure. Marjorie Baumgarten wrote, "In forward progression, the narrative would garner little interest, thus making the reverse storytelling a filmmaker's conceit." Sean Burns of the Philadelphia Weekly commented that "For all its formal wizardry, Memento is ultimately an ice-cold feat of intellectual gamesmanship. Once the visceral thrill of the puzzle structure begins to wear off, there's nothing left to hang onto. The film itself fades like one of Leonard's temporary memories." While Roger Ebert gave the film a favorable three out of four stars, he did not think it warranted multiple viewings. After watching Memento twice, he concluded that "Greater understanding helped on the plot level, but didn't enrich the viewing experience. Confusion is the state we are intended to be in." Jonathan Rosenbaum disliked the film, and commented in his review of Eternal Sunshine of the Spotless Mind that Memento is a "gimmicky and unpoetic counterfeit" of Alain Resnais's 1968 film Je t'aime, je t'aime.

In 2005, the Writers Guild of America ranked the screenplay #100 on its list of 101 Greatest Screenplays ever written. In 2012, the Motion Picture Editors Guild listed the film as the fourteenth best-edited film of all time based on a survey of its membership. Memento was considered "culturally, historically or aesthetically significant" by the US Library of Congress and was selected for preservation in the National Film Registry in 2017, the first narrative feature of the 2000s to be honored. In 2021, members of Writers Guild of America West (WGAW) and Writers Guild of America, East (WGAE) ranked its screenplay 10th in WGA’s 101 Greatest Screenplays of the 21st Century (so far).

=== Scientific response ===
Many medical experts have cited Memento as featuring one of the most realistic and accurate depictions of anterograde amnesia. Caltech neuroscientist Christof Koch called Memento "the most accurate portrayal of the different memory systems in the popular media", while physician Esther M. Sternberg, Director of the Integrative Neural Immune Program at the National Institute of Mental Health, identified the film as "close to a perfect exploration of the neurobiology of memory."

Sternberg concludes:

This thought-provoking thriller is the kind of movie that keeps reverberating in the viewer's mind, and each iteration makes one examine preconceived notions in a different light. Memento is a movie for anyone interested in the workings of memory and, indeed, in what it is that makes our own reality.

Clinical neuropsychologist Sallie Baxendale writes in The BMJ:

The overwhelming majority of amnesic characters in films bear little relation to any neurological or psychiatric realities of memory loss. Apparently inspired partly by the neuropsychological studies of the famous patient HM (who developed severe anterograde memory impairment after neurosurgery to control his epileptic seizures) and the temporal lobe amnesic syndrome, the film documents the difficulties faced by Leonard, who develops a severe anterograde amnesia after an attack in which his wife is killed. Unlike in most films in this genre, this amnesic character retains his identity, has little retrograde amnesia, and shows several of the severe everyday memory difficulties associated with the disorder. The fragmented, almost mosaic quality to the sequence of scenes in the film also reflects the 'perpetual present' nature of the syndrome.

=== Interpretations and analysis ===
By going backward in time, Memento draws the real mystery from viewers learning the first step in Leonard's investigation, the origins of his self-deception. Yes, we also learn what really happened to his wife, what happened to him, and what happened to his killer, and we understand more about Teddy's complicated role in using Leonard for his own purposes. But the most telling revelation, at the end of Memento, isn't limited to his condition: Leonard lies to himself. And when he isn't outright lying to himself, he's guilty of confirmation bias, accepting only the facts that affirm his pre-cooked conclusions, and tossing out all the rest.

— Scott Tobias, from The A.V. Club

Since its release, Memento has been a widely noted topic of film discussion, both for its unique narrative structure and themes. Those searching for explanations of the film's plot have either resorted to online forums, message boards or scholarly material, or have ignored the film's official website and forums to maintain their own personal hypotheses. On the same topic of self-deception, James Mooney of filmandphilosophy.com notes that the film suggests how "our memories deceive us, or rather, sometimes we deceive ourselves by 'choosing' to forget or by manipulating our memories of past events." This is much in line with a psychological analysis of the film, specifically the act of confabulation. Leonard's use of confabulation poses the dilemma, as explained by SUNY Downstate Medical Center Professor John Kubie for BrainFacts.org: "In Memento we are faced with the question of how much of Leonard's memory of the past is real and how much constructed from beliefs and wishes."

Author Chuck Klosterman has written in-depth about Memento in his essay collection Sex, Drugs, and Cocoa Puffs: A Low Culture Manifesto, specifically on the diner scene with Leonard and Natalie.

In an interview with Chuck Stephens for Filmmaker in 2001, Nolan also stated:

The most interesting part of that for me is that audiences seem very unwilling to believe the stuff that Teddy [Pantoliano] says at the end and yet why? I think it's because people have spent the entire film looking at Leonard's photograph of Teddy, with the caption: "Don't believe his lies." That image really stays in people's heads, and they still prefer to trust that image even after we make it very clear that Leonard's visual recollection is completely questionable. It was quite surprising, and it wasn't planned. What was always planned was that we don't ever step completely outside Leonard's head, and that we keep the audience in that interpretive mode of trying to analyze what they want to believe or not. For me, the crux of the movie is that the one guy who might actually be the authority on the truth of what happened is played by Joe Pantoliano ... who is so untrustworthy, especially given the baggage he carries in from his other movies: he's already seen by audiences as this character actor who's always unreliable. I find it very frightening, really, the level of uncertainty and malevolence Joe brings to the film.

=== Best film list appearances ===
| Year | Presenter | Title | Rank | Notes |
|---|---|---|---|---|
| 2001 | National Board of Review (NBR) | Top 10 Films of the Year | 4th | |
| 2001 | American Film Institute (AFI) | Top 10 Films of the Year | 6th | |
| 2005 | Empire | The 50 Greatest Independent Films | 14 | |
| 2005 | Writers Guild of America West | 101 Greatest Screenplays of All Time | 100 | |
| 2007 | Entertainment Weekly | The 100 Best Films From 1983 to 2008 | 23 | |
| 2008 | Empire | The 500 Greatest Movies of All Time | 173 | |
| 2009 | The A.V. Club | The Best Films of the '00s | 5 | |
| 2012 | Total Film | 50 Best Movies of Total Film Magazine's Lifetime | 2 | |
| 2013 | Motion Picture Editors Guild | 75 Best Edited Films of All Time | 14 | |
| 2014 | The Hollywood Reporter | Hollywood's 100 Favorite Films | 90 | |
| 2014 | Empire | The 301 Greatest Movies Of All Time | 58 | |
| 2016 | BBC | 100 Greatest Films of the 21st Century | 25 | |
| 2025 | The New York Times | The 100 Best Movies of the 21st Century | 62 | |
| 2025 | Rolling Stone | 100 Best Movies of the 21st Century | 54 | |

=== Awards and accolades ===
Because Jonathan Nolan's short story was not published before the film was released, it was nominated for Original Screenplay instead of Adapted Screenplay and both Christopher and Jonathan received a nomination.

| Award | Category | Recipient | Result | Ref. |
|---|---|---|---|---|
| Academy Awards | Best Original Screenplay | Christopher Nolan and Jonathan Nolan | Nominated | |
| Academy Awards | Best Film Editing | Dody Dorn | Nominated | |
| AFI Awards | Movie of the Year | Memento | Nominated | |
| AFI Awards | Story of the Year | Christopher Nolan | Won | |
| AFI Awards | Editor of the Year | Dody Dorn | Nominated | |
| Sundance Film Festival | Grand Jury Prize | Christopher Nolan | Nominated | |
| Sundance Film Festival | Waldo Salt Screenwriting Award | Christopher Nolan and Jonathan Nolan | Won | |
| Chicago Film Critics Association Awards | Best Actor | Guy Pearce | Nominated | |
| Chicago Film Critics Association Awards | Best Screenplay | Christopher Nolan | Won | |
| Directors Guild of America Awards | Outstanding Directing – Feature Film | Christopher Nolan | Nominated | |
| Independent Spirit Awards | Best Film | Memento | Won | |
| Independent Spirit Awards | Best Director | Christopher Nolan | Won | |
| Independent Spirit Awards | Best Screenplay | Christopher Nolan | Won | |
| Independent Spirit Awards | Best Supporting Female | Carrie-Anne Moss | Won | |
| Independent Spirit Awards | Best Cinematography | Wally Pfister | Nominated | |
| Belgian Film Critics Association | Grand Prix | | Nominated | |
| BAFTA Interactive Entertainment Awards | Enhancement of Linear Media | | Won | |
| British Independent Film Awards | Best Foreign Independent Film | Memento | Won | |
| Boston Society of Film Critics Awards | Best Actor | Guy Pearce | Nominated | |
| Boston Society of Film Critics Awards | Best Screenplay | Christopher Nolan | Won | |
| Bram Stoker Award | Best Screenplay | Christopher Nolan and Jonathan Nolan | Won | |
| Critics' Choice Movie Awards | Best Picture | Memento | Nominated | |
| Critics' Choice Movie Awards | Best Screenplay | Christopher Nolan | Won | |
| Saturn Awards | Best Action/Adventure/Thriller Film | Memento | Won | |
| Saturn Awards | Best Actor | Guy Pearce | Nominated | |
| Casting Society of America Awards | Best Casting | John Papsidera | Won | |
| Dallas–Fort Worth Film Critics Association Awards | Best Film | Memento | Nominated | |
| Dallas–Fort Worth Film Critics Association Awards | Russell Smith Award | Christopher Nolan | Won | |
| Deauville American Film Festival | CinéLive Award | Christopher Nolan | Won | |
| Deauville American Film Festival | Critics Award | Christopher Nolan | Won | |
| Deauville American Film Festival | Jury Special Prize | Christopher Nolan | Won | |
| Deauville American Film Festival | Grand Special Prize | Christopher Nolan | Nominated | |
| Edgar Awards | Best Screenplay | Christopher Nolan | Won | |
| Florida Film Critics Circle Awards | Best Screenplay | Christopher Nolan | Won | |
| Golden Trailer Awards | Best Drama | Memento | Won | |
| Golden Trailer Awards | Most Original | Memento | Won | |
| Golden Trailer Awards | Best of Show | Memento | Nominated | |
| London Film Critics Circle Awards | Film of the Year | Memento | Nominated | |
| London Film Critics Circle Awards | British Director of the Year | Christopher Nolan | Nominated | |
| London Film Critics Circle Awards | British Screenwriter of the Year | Christopher Nolan | Won | |
| Los Angeles Film Critics Association Awards | Best Screenplay | Christopher Nolan | Won | |
| MTV Movie Awards | Best New Filmmaker | Christopher Nolan | Won | |
| Online Film Critics Society Awards | Best Picture | Memento | Won | |
| Online Film Critics Society Awards | Best Director | Christopher Nolan | Nominated | |
| Online Film Critics Society Awards | Best Adapted Screenplay | Christopher Nolan | Won | |
| Online Film Critics Society Awards | Best Actor | Guy Pearce | Nominated | |
| Online Film Critics Society Awards | Best Breakthrough Filmmaker | Christopher Nolan | Won | |
| San Diego Film Critics Society Awards | Best Actor | Guy Pearce | Won | |
| Toronto Film Critics Association Awards | Best Film | Memento | Won | |
| Toronto Film Critics Association Awards | Best Screenplay | Christopher Nolan | Won | |
| Vancouver Film Critics Circle Awards | Best Film | Memento | Won | |

== See also ==
- List of cult films
- Reverse chronology

=== Similar films ===
- Regarding Henry (1991)
- Ghajini (2005), a Tamil-language unauthorized adaptation of Memento by A. R. Murugadoss.
- Ghajini (2008), a Hindi-language remake of the 2005 film by same director.
- The Vow (2012)

== Bibliography ==
- Mottram, James (2002). The Making of Memento. New York: Faber. ISBN 0-571-21488-6.
- Kirsch, Konrad (2024). From ›Doodlebug‹ to ›Oppenheimer‹. An Analysis of Christopher Nolan's Film Work. Stuttgart / London: Edition Axel Menges. ISBN 9783869050379.
