= Steve Yockey =

American playwright, producer and screenwriter

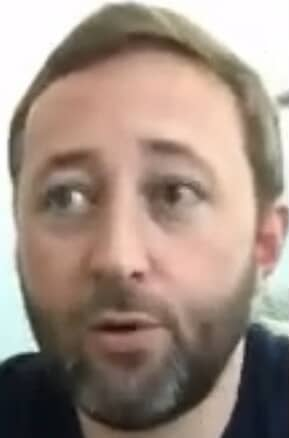
- Yockey in 2020
- Education: University of Georgia; New York University Tisch School of the Arts
- Occupations: Playwright, producer, screenwriter

Steve Yockey is an American playwright, producer and screenwriter. He is known as the creator/showrunner of the American darkly comedic thriller television series The Flight Attendant, an adaptation of the 2018 novel of the same name by Chris Bohjalian. He is also the creator/showrunner of Dead Boy Detectives, a supernatural detective series for Netflix based on the cult DC comic book.

== Career ==
Yockey attended the University of Georgia, and the New York University Tisch School of the Arts, earning his MFA degree in dramatic writing. In 2014, he wrote an episode for the MTV teen comedy drama television series Awkward. He later was a co-executive producer and writer for The CW drama television series Supernatural. He left the series in 2019 to work on the adapted HBO Max television series The Flight Attendant. At the 73rd Primetime Emmy Awards, he was nominated for two Primetime Emmy Awards in the categories Outstanding Comedy Series and Outstanding Writing. In 2022, he signed a multi-year overall deal with Warner Bros. Television.

== Playwriting ==
Yockey writes in a style that’s been called “absurd metamodernism” and leans into spectacle in his theatrical work. His plays are published and licensed by Concord Theatricals.

== Filmography ==
Year	Title	Credited as			Notes
Year	Title	Writer	Producer	Developer	Notes
2007	Sucker Punch	Yes	No	No	Short film
2014	Awkward	Yes	No	No	"#Drama"
2015	Self Promotion	No	Executive	No	TV movie
2016	Scream	Yes	No	No	Wrote 2 episodes, also story editor
2016–2019	Supernatural	Yes	Yes	No	Wrote 11 episodes Also co-producer and executive story editor
2020–2022	The Flight Attendant	Yes	Executive	Yes	Wrote 6 episodes
2021	Doom Patrol	Yes	No	No	"Dead Patrol"
2024	Dead Boy Detectives	Yes	Executive	Yes	Wrote 2 episodes

Uncredited writer

- Another Simple Favor (2025) (additional literary material writer)
