= Midwives (2001 film) =

2001 television film by Glenn Jordan

- Film poster
- Directed by: Glenn Jordan
- Written by: Cynthia Saunders (teleplay)
- Based on: Midwives by Chris Bohjalian
- Produced by: Glenn Jordan; Rosalie Muskatt
- Starring: Sissy Spacek; Peter Coyote; Terry Kinney; Alison Pill; Piper Laurie
- Cinematography: Neil Roach
- Edited by: Douglas Clark; David A. Simmons
- Music by: Cameron Allan
- Production companies: Columbia TriStar Television; Craig Anderson Productions
- Release date: April 2, 2001
- Running time: 92 minutes
- Country: United States
- Language: English

Midwives is a 2001 American television film, starring Sissy Spacek, Peter Coyote, Terry Kinney, Alison Pill and Piper Laurie. It was directed by Glenn Jordan. The film is based in the 1997 novel Midwives written by Chris Bohjalian. It was Lifetime's 100th Original Movie and had the highest rating in the network's history.

== Plot ==
Sibyl Danforth, a midwife in rural Vermont, is charged with manslaughter in the death of one of her patients.

== Cast ==
- Sissy Spacek as Sibyl Danforth
- Peter Coyote as Stephen Hastings
- Terry Kinney as Rand Danforth
- Alison Pill as Constance 'Connie' Danforth
- Piper Laurie as Cheryl Visco

== Reception ==
Midwives got most favorable reviews from critics and was nominated for "Best Motion Picture Made for Television" in the 6th Golden Satellite Awards, but lost for The Day Reagan Was Shot.

Sissy Spacek was nominated for a Screen Actors Guild Award in the category of "Outstanding Performance by a Female Actor in a Television Movie or Miniseries" and a Satellite Award in the category of "Best Performance by an Actress in a Miniseries or a Motion Picture Made for Television", but lost both to Judy Davis in Life with Judy Garland: Me and My Shadows.
