= Yes, Norman Productions =

Film and television production company

- Type: Private
- Industry: Production company
- Founded: October 27, 2017; 8 years ago
- Founder: Kaley Cuoco
- Headquarters: Beverly Hills, California, U.S.
- Key people: Kaley Cuoco (CEO); Suzanne McCormack (SVP)
- Owner: Kaley Cuoco

Yes, Norman Productions is an American film and television production company founded on October 27, 2017 by actress and producer Kaley Cuoco. It produced the television series Harley Quinn (2019–present) and The Flight Attendant (2020–2022).

== History ==
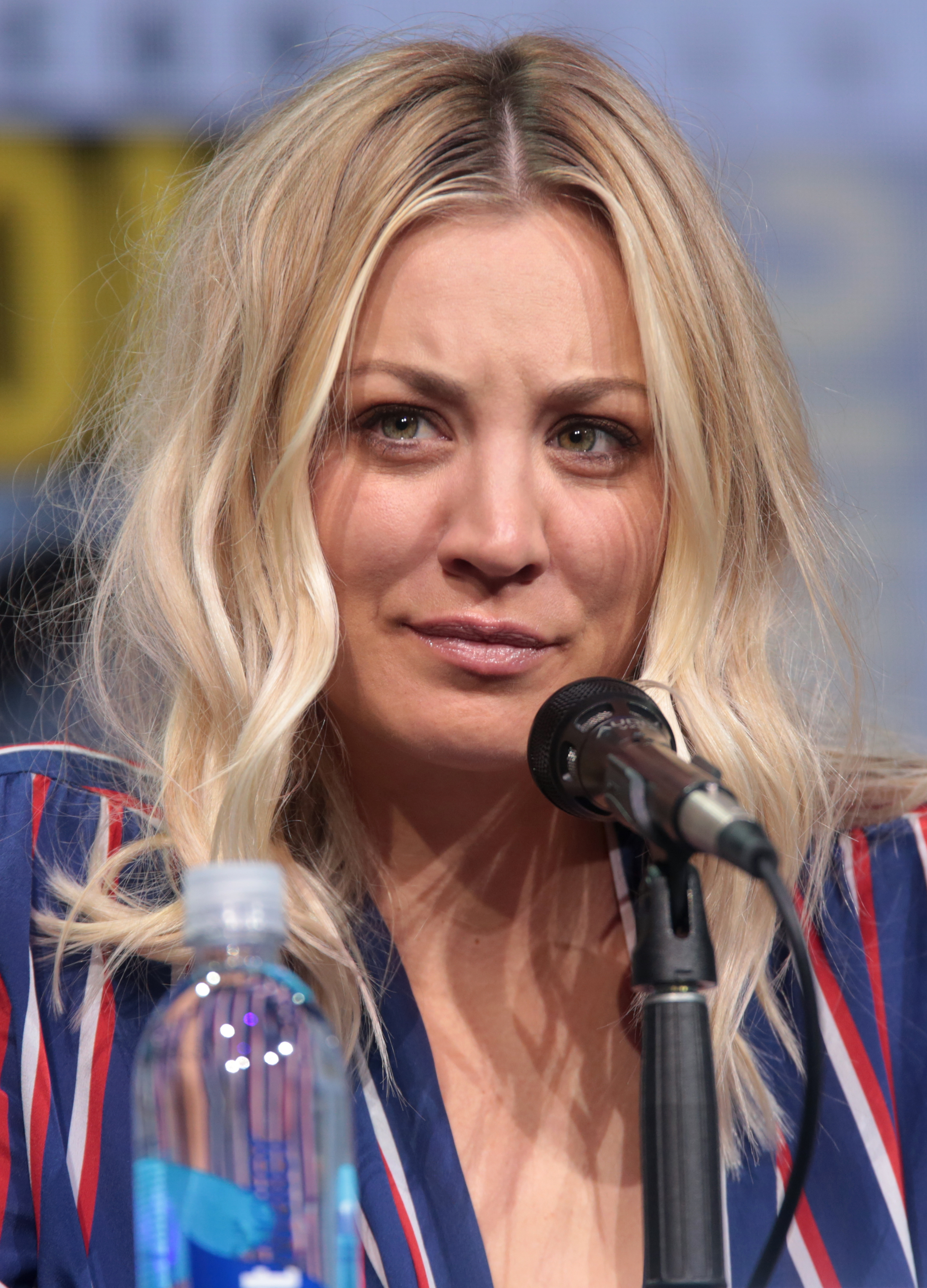
The company's founder Kaley Cuoco in 2017

In October 2017, the company, founded by actress and producer Kaley Cuoco, entered an exclusive multi-year first look production deal with Warner Bros. Television. The production company is named after Cuoco's dog. With this production deal, the company optioned the rights to The Flight Attendant, a book written by author Chris Bohjalian. The book was later developed into a black comedy mystery thriller series of the same name, with Cuoco starring and serving as executive producer. Greg Berlanti also serves as executive producer via his production company, Berlanti Productions.

In August 2018, Suzanne McCormack joined the company from Chuck Lorre Productions as senior vice president, and oversees the development and production of the company's television and film projects. In October 2018, it was announced that the company would co-produce the DC Universe animated series Harley Quinn, with Cuoco as one of the show's executive producers and the voice of its main character, Dr. Harleen Quinzel / Harley Quinn.

In July 2019, the company entered a two-year first look production deal with Warner Bros. Television, and announced that The Flight Attendant had been picked up by WarnerMedia's streaming platform, HBO Max. In August 2019, it was announced that the company would produce an upcoming CBS comedy, Pretty, which is written by Lindsey Kraft and Santina Muha, and will also star Kraft. On November 29, 2019, Harley Quinn premiered on DC Universe, with the second season premiering on April 3, 2020, and a third season announced on September 18, 2020, alongside the announcement that the show would move to HBO Max, following the restructuring of DC Universe.

In November 2020, it was announced that the company will be producing a live-action series called America's Sweetheart, from the developers of Harley Quinn for Apple TV+, but the series later moved to HBO Max. On November 26, 2020, The Flight Attendant premiered on HBO Max, and in December 2020, the series was renewed for a second season. The second season premiered on April 21, 2022.

In an interview with Variety in February 2021, Cuoco said that her company was acquiring the rights to a limited series about the life of actress, singer, and animal welfare activist, Doris Day. In March 2021, it was announced that the company would be producing and developing a limited series about Doris Day, based on the 1976 biography Doris Day: Her Own Story by A. E. Hotchner. Cuoco will play Doris Day in the series and executive produce alongside Greg Berlanti, who will also executive produce via Berlanti Productions.

In May 2021, the company optioned the rights to A Season With Mom, a book written by author Katie Russell Newland, and foreword written by former American football quarterback, Peyton Manning. Also in May 2021, the company signed a three-year first look production deal with Warner Bros. Television Studios.

In October 2021, it was announced that the company would be co-producing the thriller film Role Play, with The Picture Company and StudioCanal, written by Seth Owen and directed by Thomas Vincent. The film's cast includes Cuoco, David Oyelowo, Bill Nighy, and Connie Nielsen. Role Play began principal photography in July 2022 at Babelsberg Studio in Berlin, Germany, and was released on Amazon Prime Video on January 12, 2024.

== Filmography ==
=== Television ===
Year	Title	Network	Notes	Ref.
2019–present	Harley Quinn	DC Universe; HBO Max/Max	with Lorey Stories, Ehsugadee Productions, Delicious Non-Sequitur Productions, DC Entertainment, and Warner Bros. Animation	
2020–2022	The Flight Attendant	HBO Max	with Berlanti Productions and Warner Bros. Television	
2024	Kite Man: Hell Yeah!	Max	with Lorey Stories, Delicious Non-Sequitur Productions, DC Studios, and Warner Bros. Animation	

==== In development ====
- Kansas City Star (HBO; with Warner Bros. Television)

=== Film ===
Year	Title	Director	Gross (worldwide)	Notes	Distributor	Ref.
2022	Meet Cute	Alex Lehmann	—N/a	with Weed Road Pictures and Convergent Media	Peacock	
2024	Role Play	Thomas Vincent	—N/a	with The Picture Company and StudioCanal	Amazon Prime Video	
