= Midwives (novel) =

1997 novel by Chris Bohjalian

- First edition cover
- Author: Chris Bohjalian
- Language: English
- Publisher: Harmony Books
- Publication date: April 1997
- Publication place: United States
- Media type: Print (hardback & paperback)
- Pages: 312 pp (hardback edition)
- ISBN: 0-517-70396-3 (hardback edition)
- OCLC: 34839705
- Dewey Decimal: 813/.54 20
- LC Class: PS3552.O495 M5 1997

Midwives: A Novel is a novel by Chris Bohjalian, and was chosen as an Oprah's Book Club selection in October 1998.

== Film, TV or theatrical adaptations ==
A TV film, Midwives, was made in 2001, adapted from this novel. It stars Sissy Spacek, Piper Laurie and directed by Glenn Jordan.
