= Meet Cute (film) =

2022 American film by Alex Lehmann

- Official release poster
- Directed by: Alex Lehman
- Written by: Noga Pnueli
- Produced by: Akiva Goldsman; Gregory Lessans; Rachel Reznick Wizenberg; Santosh Govindaraju; Dan Reardon
- Starring: Kaley Cuoco; Pete Davidson
- Cinematography: John Matysiak
- Edited by: Christopher Donlon
- Music by: Stephen Lukach
- Production companies: Weed Road Pictures; Convergent Media; Orogen Entertainment; The Exchange; Anamorphic Media; Three Point Capital; Amnis Investments; Summerland Entertainment; Sprockefeller Pictures; Yes, Norman Productions; King For A Night Productions
- Distributed by: Peacock
- Release date: September 21, 2022
- Running time: 89 minutes
- Country: United States
- Language: English

Meet Cute is a 2022 American romantic dark comedy film directed by Alex Lehmann, starring Kaley Cuoco and Pete Davidson.

Sheila and Gary are on a one-day time loop, as she wants to relive their 'meet cute' over and over.

It was digitally released on September 21, 2022, on Peacock, and received mixed reviews from critics.

== Plot ==
Manhattan resident Sheila discovers that a tanning bed in June's nail salon is a time machine. One night at a bar, she runs into Gary, a meek man who prefers to watch movies over sports. They go on a date and bond over their similar taste in drinks, and childhoods before the night ends.

Throughout the date, Sheila tells him that she has been using June's time machine to relive the same night for the past seven nights. They end the date on good terms and she tells him that she'll see him again the next day.

Over the course of a month's worth of resets, Sheila reveals that she began using time travel on the day she planned to kill herself. During the first reset, she and Gary met in a bar and had a nice date. Having felt happy for the first time in a long time, Sheila continues to reset the day and relive the date.

On several occasions on the dates, Sheila reveals that when she was young a cable man who came to her house was nice to her in a way that stuck with her, but she doesn't know why she brings it up. After about five months, standing at the spot where she planned to jump off the Manhattan Bridge, she admits that she's in love with Gary, which unnerves him to the point of leaving the date.

After the 364th reset, the monotony of the same date catches up to Sheila. She decides to use the time machine to spice up their date by going further back and changing Gary. On the first anniversary of the resets, he is no longer interested in movies, and is now an assertive and successful businessman.

Unfortunately, Sheila reveals that she manipulated his life by taking on the role of "Uncle Charlie", Gary's new childhood neighbor who played catch with him and got him interested in sports, as well as "deleting" a couple of negative people in Gary's life. Gary does not take the news kindly and the two end the date on poor terms.

Although Sheila goes back to undo her edits in Gary's life, he experiences déjà vu and manages to piece together that they have indeed experienced the date multiple times. Upset, Gary uses the knowledge he gained from their date, namely the location of June and the time machine and where Sheila used to live, to try to save her from wanting to commit suicide, which had also made her obsessed with him. It is revealed that Gary is the cable man who was nice to her when she was young, leaving her life unchanged.

Deciding that reliving the same day is no longer making her happy, Sheila goes to commit suicide, which June notices and informs Gary when he comes back from the past. He manages to catch up to Sheila and tells her the machine sent him forward, that she did not commit suicide, and that they met again "tomorrow". Gary walks away from her. This lie works, and Sheila follows him off the bridge; as the sun rises on tomorrow, the two continue a truly new day for their date.

== Cast ==
- Kaley Cuoco as Sheila
- Pete Davidson as Gary
- Deborah S. Craig as June

In addition, Kevin Corrigan portrays Phil the bartender, Rock Kohli portrays Amit the waiter and Hari Nef portrays Chai the ice cream vendor; all three have extended screen time in the mid-credits montage of scene variations.

== Production ==
In June 2021, it was announced that Kaley Cuoco and Pete Davidson would play the lead roles in a romantic comedy film. It was also announced that the film would be directed by Alex Lehmann. The film's screenplay, written by Noga Pnueli, was featured on the 2018 Black List, which compiles the best unproduced scripts of the year.

The film is produced by Akiva Goldsman, Gregory Lessans, and Rachel Reznick for Weed Road Pictures, and Santosh Govindaraju and Dan Reardon for Convergent Media.

=== Filming ===
Principal photography began in August 2021 in New York City. On August 27, 2021, Cuoco announced that filming had wrapped.

== Reception ==
On the review aggregator website Rotten Tomatoes, the film holds an approval rating of 59% based on 34 reviews, with an average rating of 6.1/10. The website's critics consensus reads, "Its charming stars notwithstanding, the middling Meet Cute offers little to set itself apart in the ever-more-crowded 'time loop romcom' subgenre." Metacritic, which uses a weighted average, assigned the film a score of 50 out of 100, based on 13 critics, indicating "mixed or average reviews".

CNN's Brian Lowry characterized the film as a "modest win" for Peacock that ultimately cannot overcome the formula of Groundhog Day-style films.

== See also ==
- List of films featuring time loops
