= The Flight Attendant =

American comedy-drama television series

- Genre: Thriller; Comedy drama; Dark comedy; Mystery
- Based on: The Flight Attendant by Chris Bohjalian
- Developed by: Steve Yockey
- Starring: Kaley Cuoco; Michiel Huisman; Zosia Mamet; T. R. Knight; Michelle Gomez; Colin Woodell; Merle Dandridge; Griffin Matthews; Nolan Gerard Funk; Rosie Perez; Deniz Akdeniz; Mo McRae; Callie Hernandez; J. J. Soria; Cheryl Hines
- Music by: Blake Neely
- Country of origin: United States
- Original language: English
- No. of seasons: 2
- No. of episodes: 16

Production
- Executive producers: Susanna Fogel; Sarah Schechter; Meredith Lavender; Marcie Ulin; Steve Yockey; Kaley Cuoco; Greg Berlanti; Silver Tree; David Madden; Suzanne McCormack; Natalie Chaidez
- Producers: Erika Kennair; Jennifer Lence; Raymond Quinlan; Ian Weinreich; Stephanie Johnson; Carl Ogawa; Bonnie Muñoz
- Cinematography: Brian Burgoyne; Adrian Peng Correia; Jay Feather; Hillary Spera; Cort Fey; Anthony Hardwick
- Editors: Heather Persons; Anthony Miller; Carol Stutz; Jean Crupper; Rita K. Sanders; Katie Ruzicka; Christopher Petrus
- Running time: 37–49 minutes
- Production companies: Berlanti Productions; Yes, Norman Productions; Warner Bros. Television

Original release
- Network: HBO Max
- Release: November 26, 2020 – May 26, 2022

The Flight Attendant is an American dark comedy drama mystery thriller television series developed by Steve Yockey based on the 2018 novel of the same name by Chris Bohjalian. It stars Kaley Cuoco in the title role and premiered on HBO Max on November 26, 2020. In December 2020, the series was renewed for a second season, which premiered on April 21, 2022. In January 2024, Cuoco announced that a third season was not in the plans and that the second season had been the last.

== Plot ==
American flight attendant Cassie Bowden is a reckless alcoholic who drinks during flights and spends her time having sex with strangers, including her passengers. When she wakes up in a hotel room in Bangkok with a hangover from the night before, she discovers the body of a passenger on her last flight, lying next to her with his throat slashed. Afraid to call the police, she cleans up the crime scene, then joins the other airline crew traveling to the airport. In New York City, she is met by Federal Bureau of Investigation (FBI) agents who question her about the layover in Bangkok. Still unable to piece the night together, and suffering intermittent flashbacks/hallucinations about it, she begins to wonder who the killer could be.

Season 2 takes place a year after the events of the previous season. Cassie now works part-time as an asset for the CIA, where she surveils people in between flights. She has been sober for a year, is a regular member of Alcoholics Anonymous, and has relocated to Los Angeles, where she has a new boyfriend, Marco. During an assignment in Berlin, her target is assassinated by a woman pretending to be her, down to the tattoo. She is haunted by the images of her doppelgänger and tries to figure out who is impersonating her, while suffering hallucinations once again, this time of the past versions of herself who try to persuade her to revert to who she once was.

== Cast and characters ==
=== Main ===
- Kaley Cuoco as Cassandra "Cassie" Bowden: An alcoholic flight attendant with self-destructive tendencies. She has a one-night stand with a passenger in Bangkok and wakes up to his dead body the next morning. She is left to search for answers to clear her name of the murder.
  - Audrey Grace Marshall portrays young Cassie.
- Michiel Huisman as Alex Sokolov (season 1): A businessman on Cassie's flight to Bangkok. He is murdered in the first episode and primarily appears through hallucinations and flashbacks.
- Zosia Mamet as Annie Mouradian: A lawyer and Cassie's best friend who assists her with her situation.
- T. R. Knight as Davey Bowden (season 1; recurring season 2): Cassie's older brother, with whom she has a complicated relationship. Owen Asztalos portrays young Davey in season 1.
- Michelle Gomez as Miranda Croft (season 1; guest season 2): A mysterious woman with connections to Alex.
- Colin Woodell as Buckley Ware, also known as Feliks (season 1; guest season 2): Cassie's romantic interest who she meets on a bender.
- Merle Dandridge as Kim Hammond (season 1): The lead FBI agent investigating Alex's murder and Agent White's partner.
- Griffin Matthews as Shane Evans: A flight attendant and a friend of Cassie's.
- Nolan Gerard Funk as Van White (season 1): An FBI agent who suspects Cassie of the murder and Agent Hammond's partner.
- Rosie Perez as Megan Briscoe: The team flight lead and Cassie's friend, who has secrets of her own.
- Deniz Akdeniz as Max Park (season 2; recurring season 1): Annie's boyfriend and a hacker who helps Cassie.
- Mo McRae as Benjamin Berry (season 2): A CIA agent who serves as Cassie's handler.
- Callie Hernandez as Gabrielle Diaz (season 2): Esteban's wife and a passenger on Cassie's flight to Berlin.
- J. J. Soria as Esteban Diaz (season 2): Gabrielle's husband and a passenger on Cassie's flight to Berlin.
- Cheryl Hines as Dot Karlson (season 2): Benjamin's boss in the CIA.

=== Recurring ===
- Terry Serpico as Bill Briscoe
- Bruce Baek as Hak Oh-Seong
- Briana Cuoco as Cecilia
- David Iacono as Eli Briscoe
- Yasha Jackson as Jada Harris
- Sherin Shetty as Jennifer (season 1)
- Jason Jones as Hank Bowden (season 1)
- Alberto Frezza as Enrico (season 1)
- Bebe Neuwirth as Diana Carlisle (season 1)
- Isha Blaaker as Nate (season 1)
- Stephanie Koenig as Sabrina Oznowich (season 1)
- Ritchie Coster as Victor (season 1)
- Ann Magnuson as Janet Sokolov (season 1)
- Kayvon Esmaili as Will Kotov (season 2)
- Mae Martin as Grace St. James (season 2)
- Jessie Ennis as Jenny (season 2)
- Santiago Cabrera as Marco (season 2)
- Shohreh Aghdashloo as Brenda (season 2)
- Erik Passoja as Jim Jones (season 2)
- Margaret Cho as Charlie Utada (season 2)
- Alanna Ubach as Carol Atkinson (season 2)
- Sharon Stone as Lisa Bowden (season 2)
- Izabella Miko as Cherri (season 2)

== Episodes ==
Season	Episodes	Originally released	
Season	Episodes	First released	Last released
1	8	November 26, 2020	December 17, 2020
2	8	April 21, 2022	May 26, 2022

=== Season 1 (2020) ===
No. overall	No. in season	Title	Directed by	Teleplay by	Original release date	Prod. code
1	1	"In Case of Emergency"	Susanna Fogel	Steve Yockey	November 26, 2020 (Note: This episode was released on the HBO Max YouTube channel on November 18, 2020, ahead of the debut of the series.)	U13.14051
Flight attendant Cassie is a reckless alcoholic who spends time between flights getting drunk and hooking up. She has a strained relationship with her brother and has flashbacks to trauma from her childhood. She often calls her best friend, a lawyer, Annie, and has a rocky relationship with her friend and co-worker, Megan. On a flight to Bangkok, she flirts with a handsome stranger, Alex Sokolov. When the flight lands, they go out partying and they both get drunk and end up having sex. She wakes up the next morning hung over and is horrified to find Alex dead in bed next to her, with his throat slit. Scared of being arrested, she cleans up the mess and leaves. She is unable to remember any events from the night, but over time she remembers it in flashes. She later realizes she lost her ID. After returning home to the United States, she is questioned by FBI Agents Van and Kim. She made herself look suspicious by trying to run prior to the interview. She ultimately remembers that there was a third person with her and Alex the night he was murdered.
2	2	"Rabbits"	Susanna Fogel	Steve Yockey	November 26, 2020	U13.14052
Cassie keeps having conversations with her vision of Alex, including one where she remembers that they met with Miranda, his business associate, in Bangkok. Instead of contacting Annie, Cassie goes to Alex's office hoping to find Miranda. The FBI contacts her, wanting to question her further. She meets with Annie, tells her what happened, and stuns her with the revelation that she visited the office. She promises Annie she will not drink and will be on time for the FBI meeting, but gets drunk that night and sleeps with Buckley, a man she met in a nightclub. She also continues a strained relationship with her brother Davey. Van and Kim learn that the hotel security footage is gone. In Bangkok, Miranda attempts to track down Cassie. The FBI has a photo of Cassie at Alex's office at Unisphere, so she reveals everything, but says Alex was still alive when she left. Megan trades a student's drugs for a flash drive. Miranda is in New York, watching Cassie, and with help from Sabrina, Cassie realizes that Miranda may be Alex's murderer.
3	3	"Funeralia"	Tom Vaughan	Kara Lee Corthron & Ryan Jennifer Jones	November 26, 2020	U13.14053
Cassie learns that Miranda broke into her house and is frightened, needing answers. She flashes back to when her drinking began as a child at her father's funeral. Annie learns that the FBI has found the murder weapon and is testing for prints. She confronts Sabrina about having drinks with Cassie and asks what she knows about Miranda; however, Sabrina denies ever having drinks with Cassie. Megan is entangled in corporate espionage with her husband's company, stealing blueprints from his computer for another business. Cassie thinks Alex dated Miranda, so she attends his funeral looking for answers. Annie's hacker boyfriend, Max, learns that Unisphere is owned by the dangerous Sokolovs and that they are using it to launder money. Cassie learns Alex did not date Miranda, but later hears Alex's mother and father talking about Miranda and destroying documents from a company called Lionfish. Cassie steals the shredded documents and on her way home she is approached by Miranda on the train.
4	4	"Conspiracy Theories"	John Strickland	Ian Weinreich	December 3, 2020	U13.14054
Cassie escapes Miranda. Buckley continues to pursue Cassie. Annie is informed by her boss that she now owes the firm's client for getting Cassie out of Alex's memorial unharmed. Megan's husband grows suspicious of her use of his laptop as she continues handing files over. Cassie follows the trail of the documents she stole and with Max's help learns that Lionfish and the Sokolovs flew a plane from Teterboro, NJ to Portland, ME once a week with a very short layover. She gets herself on the plane with Nate's help, but learns that there are never passengers on it and that the pilots pretend they saw passengers. She learns the plane is transporting missile parts. Miranda is taken off investigating Cassie and from retrieving a missing item. She later approaches Sabrina, who promises Miranda she did not say anything or share information. Cassie's visit with Davey goes badly as he thinks she is drunk when she is not and he's jealous of her childhood. Angry, she has sex with Buckley. She realizes Sabrina may know about the missiles and the plane, and goes to speak with her. Outside her building, she is horrified when Sabrina's body falls from her apartment window.
5	5	"Other People's Houses"	Glen Winter	Ticona S. Joy	December 3, 2020	U13.14055
Cassie and Max decide to investigate Alex's apartment to look for evidence proving the Sokolovs are dirty and to clear her with the FBI after Sabrina's murder. Van suspects Sabrina really did commit suicide, while Kim believes her to be murdered. Annie is called in to pay her debts by a mysterious and dangerous client and is tasked with giving an inmate a message that his family will be taken care of. She wishes not to go through with it, but is given no choice by her boss. While visiting prison, she is horrified to have to give the inmate pills that will kill him. Miranda is ordered to return home by her boss. Megan's husband grows suspicious. Buckley runs into Cassie. Cassie and Max investigate Alex's apartment where she learns that he was not the person she thought he was, with a large pornography collection and prescription painkillers from a number of different doctors. They find an address for Lionfish and go to investigate, where they find an empty and abandoned building. Inside, they find Lionfish and Sokolov servers which contain IDs of people who have been murdered, including Cassie's missing ID. While copying server data onto a flash drive, they realize someone knows they are there and flee. As they run out, a car speeds towards them and Max pushes Cassie out of the way but is struck by the car.
6	6	"After Dark"	Batan Silva	Jess Meyer	December 10, 2020	U13.14056
Max survives but is badly injured, much to Annie's chagrin. Cassie thinks that the flash drive will prove she and Max were doing good work but is missing from Max's pants pocket. Annie tells Cassie they are done, which sends Cassie into a drinking depression. Cassie calls Buckley and they hook up and then go on a bender together. Van and Kim have an agent tailing Cassie, which Cassie notices, forcing him to leave. He is murdered by an unknown assailant. Megan learns that she left Cassie a voicemail of her talking to the Koreans and deletes it from Cassie's phone while she is in a bar drunk. Cassie and Alex deduce in her head that her childhood wasn't how she remembered it and that Davey was treated badly by their father. Cassie tearfully tries to make up with Annie, who refuses as she points out that they really don't know who each other are and their friendship doesn't work. Cassie, deflated, tells her she'll be sorry when she ends up dead. Annie quits her job at the firm. Cassie and Buckley are arrested and Cassie apologies to Davey over the phone as they emotionally mend fences. Megan's husband is called into work due to a computer issue. Someone attempts to murder Miranda, who posts Cassie's bail and approaches her with a gun, telling her they need to talk.
7	7	"Hitchcock Double"	Marcos Siega	Meredith Lavender & Marcie Ulin	December 10, 2020	U13.14057
Miranda learns that Cassie is not the killer and does not have the money she is looking for. She tells Cassie that Victor must have hired his enforcer, Feliks, to kill them and he is the one who has killed Alex for his money and others. Cassie and Davey make up. Cassie also mends fences with Annie, but decides it is better for her and Miranda to go on the run rather than to involve Annie. Flashbacks reveal Cassie feels she is at fault for her father's death as they were both drinking while he was driving and she has kept this a secret. Annie tells Max she loves him. Megan's husband is suspected to be involved with North Korean espionage and he realizes that Megan is the true culprit. Cassie realizes she has a drinking problem and these revelations help her remember where Alex had stored the money encryption key. She and Miranda go to retrieve it and are followed by Feliks, causing them to run. They must jump to the roof of the next building and Miranda loses the book. However, Cassie sees that Feliks is really Buckley. She and Miranda make a plan to use herself as bait and catch him.
8	8	"Arrivals & Departures"	Marcos Siega	Steve Yockey	December 17, 2020	U13.14058
Cassie's fingerprints are found on the bottle. Miranda learns of Victor's location and confronts him, before killing him and taking the money. This causes her to miss the flight to Rome. Buckley follows Cassie to Rome and attempts to kidnap her. He later knocks out Miranda. Cassie escapes and obtains a gun from Enrico. Annie turns over the flash drive to Van and Kim, exonerating Cassie, as they all realize Buckley is the killer. Megan and Cassie share their secrets with each other as Megan goes on the run. Cassie kisses Alex goodbye in her head. Cassie is confronted by Buckley, who divulges that he has been stalking her since Bangkok. Buckley attempts to kill Cassie and Enrico, but they are both saved by Shane, who arrests Buckley. Shane reveals he has been working with the CIA undercover investigating Megan. Miranda disappears but gives Cassie the book. Back home, Cassie reunites with Davey, promising him she will be different from now on. Cassie vows to remain sober to Davey and Annie. Shane tells Cassie that the CIA is interested in her becoming a human asset. Cassie reflects on her journey and the scenarios in her mind as she closes the dark part of her life for good and smiles, happy for the future.

=== Season 2 (2022) ===
No. overall	No. in season	Title	Directed by	Written by	Original release date	Prod. code
9	1	"Seeing Double"	Silver Tree	Steve Yockey	April 21, 2022	U13.14701
Cassie tells her new AA group she just moved to LA and is dating Marco. She doubles as a CIA informant, tasked with taking photos and reporting back to her handler, Benjamin. Her next assignment is to observe a target named Will at a hotel in Berlin. Pre-flight she meets Grace St. James, another flight attendant. Annie and Max arrive in LA for an interview. At the hotel, a couple secretly clone Cassie's phone. Without authorization, Cassie follows Will, observes him in a hotel room with a woman who is her doppelganger, and sees a surveillance team watching too. Back on the street, a car he gets into explodes. In a trip into her mind, everything has changed. On her flight home she confides in Grace and they plan to hang out in LA. Jim Jones from the surveillance team is on the flight but she ditches him. Cassie is forced to meet with Benjamin's boss Dot to discuss her actions and lies. Cassie tries to tell her about the doppelganger. Dot grounds Cassie for a few days. Cassie spots Jim Jones before she leaves Dot's building. Annie has a ring but is not engaged. Cassie's luggage is delivered but contains items that are not hers.
10	2	"Mushrooms, Tasers, and Bears, Oh My!"	Silver Tree	Elizabeth Benjamin & Jess Meyer	April 21, 2022	U13.14702
Cassie tells Annie and Max she works for the CIA and about what happened in Berlin. Cassie thinks it is Grace who is disguising herself as Cassie's doppelganger. Cassie goes to Grace's place and follows her when she comes outside. At the airport, she cannot follow Grace past a gate. Annie goes to her interview. Cassie goes to her AA meeting to celebrate 1 year of sobriety. Davey arrives with a stuffed bear gift. In her mind, Cassie confronts the "new hers" and there is also a younger version of herself. Jenny from the AA group and Davey leave together, and Jenny tries to get Davey to do her podcast. Cassie goes to Grace's to hang out, peeks at her in the shower, and looks through her stuff. An elderly couple warn Megan the mushrooms she is picking are poisonous. Max tracks down the subject of a cryptic photo from the ViewMaster, and Cassie, Annie, and Max go to Echo Park, where an unknown person takes their picture. At dinner, Cassie tells Annie that she no longer thinks Grace is her doppelganger. Eli calls Cassie about a cryptic text message from Megan. Annie and Max meet a neighbor but do not know he is the one who cloned Cassie's phone.
11	3	"The Reykjavik Ice Sculpture Festival Is Lovely This Time of Year"	Jennifer Phang	Louisa Levy & Ryan Jennifer Jones	April 28, 2022	U13.14703
The Diazes are listening in on Cassie's place. Cassie tries to decode Megan's message with the help of the versions of herself in her mind. Cassie sneaks off to Iceland to find Megan. Shane is working the flight and in her mind Cassie figures out he must know Megan's in Iceland. Cassie hunts for Megan in Reykjavik and reminisces about good times drinking with her. Max takes Annie to his parents house in LA. Annie removes her engagement ring before going inside. Davey calls Cassie about the podcast. Cassie gets stuck having dinner with Shane and when her credit card is declined, she learns someone has used it to purchase tape, ropes, tarps, and other items. In her room she is tempted to drink. Benjamin complains to Dot about Cassie not following orders and not answering her phone. Cassie finds an AA meeting and gets a lead on Megan. Max and Annie's relationship gets bumpy. Megan is not happy to see Cassie. The Diazes break into Cassie's home and are there when Max and Annie come back.
12	4	"Blue Sincerely Reunion"	Jennifer Phang	Natalie Chaidez & Haruna Lee	April 28, 2022	U13.14704
Megan tells Cassie she decoded her message wrong. Megan is hiding with Charlie due to the bounty on her head. They have plans to eliminate Hak who is pursuing the bounty. Miranda shows up and kills Hak instead. Cassie is confronted about March 21 and 23 in her mind. Miranda calls Cecilia to help dispose of the body. Jenny calls Cassie about the podcast. The Diazes tie up Annie and Max, then search and find Megan's envelope from Iceland. Cassie, Megan, Charlie, and Miranda are on the run in Reykjavik. Cecilia confesses to exposing their location for the bounty. The ladies fight with their pursuer, then get away. Cassie takes a call from Shane and thinks she recognizes Cecilia. The Diazes take off and Annie discovers they took her ring. Annie and Max go to the neighbor's place and discover the true neighbors tied up in the closet. Miranda flies the ladies back to LA and Cassie hears about two Echo Park murders on the news. Cassie takes Megan to Brenda's due to the cops being at her place, but Megan wants to go to Long Island. Cassie visits Benjamin's office and he tells her it was two CIA agents who were murdered. They have sex.
13	5	"Drowning Women"	Pete Chatmon	Liz Sagal & Steve Yockey	May 5, 2022	U13.14705
Cassie takes pictures of her file on Benjamin's desk, and Dot sees her sneak out. Cassie learns the ViewMaster is gone. Cassie and Marco's relationship unravels. Dot confronts Benjamin about Cassie who calls Shane for help. Shane obtains photos of Cassie's doppelganger, but he needs the ViewMaster. Megan goes to NY to meet with Cherri and learns Wanda stole the lockbox. Max traces the bugs he found and realizes the Diazes hacked his laptop. Benjamin asks Jim Jones to put Cassie's file back and erase that he checked it out. Cassie storms out of flight attendant training and goes to Grace's house, where she takes a drink. Megan puts mushroom powder in Wanda's drink and gets back her lockbox. Cassie gets drunk, trashes her place and the stuffed bear. Annie and Max go to the Diazes' real house to retrieve Annie's ring. Cassie goes to the beach and throws the bear in the ocean. In her mind, her drinking episodes on March 21 and 23 are revealed. She calls Brenda.
14	6	"Brothers & Sisters"	Silver Tree	Ian Weinreich & Kristin Layne Tucker	May 12, 2022	U13.14706
Annie tells Cassie to go on the planned trip with her brother. Seeing Jim Jones outside, she ducks in an Uber. On the plane Cassie confesses to Davey that she drank. Megan learns of her family's financial troubles. Cassie reads her forgiveness letter at her dad's grave. Cassie's doppelganger sneaks in her home and plants the knife that killed the CIA agents. Dot reprimands Benjamin, who contacts Shane about Cassie's recent behavior. Max tells Annie the Diazes are sending reports on Cassie to a Korean group. Cassie discovers a box with the ViewMaster, planted in a break-in at her mom's house. Cassie apologizes for being a shitty daughter and Lisa tells Cassie she loves her but does not like her. Bill talks to Megan but then calls the FBI on her. Dot tells Cassie the incident in Berlin is connected to the murders and that she has doubts about Benjamin. Cassie tells Dot that Jim Jones was in Berlin and Echo Park. Cassie and Davey run from North Koreans. Davey solves one of the ViewMaster pictures and Cassie asks Shane to trace the boat number. At the boat, Cassie's doppelganger shoots Jim Jones.
15	7	"No Exit"	Silver Tree	Jess Meyer	May 19, 2022	U13.14707
Shane and Cassie go to the marina and Cassie apologizes. He tells her everyone who was killed had contact with Will. They think Benjamin is framing Cassie for the murders. On the boat they find 3 murdered people. Cassie takes her glove that was planted at the scene. Megan assaults a North Korean. Cassie and Shane leave when Jenny shows up at the boat. Shane thinks the last ViewMaster photo will show the place of Cassie's death. Megan asks Cassie to help set up a meeting with Shane. Max figures out the last photo and Cassie finds the planted knife. At the Santa Monica pier, Cassie spots her doppelganger and the Diazes show up. After a call with Cassie, Dot heads for the pier. As Benjamin shows up, Cassie hides on the Ferris Wheel. From the ride Cassie thinks she sees Benjamin hurt Shane. Max lures the Diazes to the beach, where Annie tazes them and takes back her ring. Grace confronts Cassie and they get back on the ride. Grace tells Cassie she just stabbed Benjamin, but she does not appear to know anything about the ViewMaster. Cassie asks her who she is working for. Grace considers her options, then commits suicide.
16	8	"Backwards and Forwards"	Silver Tree	Steve Yockey	May 26, 2022	U13.14708
At the airport Megan talks to the North Korean in her trunk, then goes back to LA. Dot takes Cassie to the hospital. Dot clears Benjamin and tells Cassie that Grace was not working alone. Cassie brings Megan to Shane's room to give him the evidence against the North Koreans. Dot takes Cassie to her place to shower. Cassie sees a photo of Dot in Iraq, then finds the perfume, and connects the dots. Dot tells Cassie she picked her to frame because she knew Cassie would follow the ViewMaster clues. In her mind, Cassie pushes back hard at the version of herself and tells her she is not going to take it anymore. Cassie sets off a personal safety alarm and Dot is arrested by two men Benjamin sent. Benjamin tells her he was suspicious of the information in her file. Cassie goes to Jenny's place to retrieve Davey. Jenny pulls out a hammer and tells Cassie about falling in love with Feliks, who is using Jenny to find and murder Cassie. Davey and Cassie team up to take down Jenny. Megan and her family go into witness protection. Cassie flies to Las Vegas to attend Max and Annie's wedding.

== Production ==
=== Development ===
On October 27, 2017, it was announced that Kaley Cuoco's production company, Yes, Norman Productions, had optioned the rights to the novel, The Flight Attendant. The novel would be developed into what was reported to be a limited television series with Cuoco as executive producer. On July 1, 2019, it was announced that Greg Berlanti had joined the series as an executive producer through Berlanti Productions. On July 1, 2019, it was announced that the series would join WarnerMedia's new streaming service, HBO Max. On December 18, 2020, HBO Max renewed the series for a second season. On May 31, 2022, Cuoco said the series would likely end with season two. On January 19, 2024, she announced that the series would not return for Season 3.

=== Casting ===
Upon the series development announcement, Cuoco was also cast to star in the series. In September 2019, Sonoya Mizuno was cast to star alongside Cuoco. In October, Michiel Huisman, Colin Woodell, Rosie Perez, and Zosia Mamet joined the cast of the series. In November 2019, Merle Dandridge, Griffin Matthews, and T. R. Knight joined the cast of the series. In December 2019, Nolan Gerard Funk joined the cast. Bebe Neuwirth was added in a recurring role in February 2020. In August 2020, Michelle Gomez joined the cast of the series, replacing Mizuno. In October 2020, Yasha Jackson joined the cast in a recurring role. In September 2021, Mo McRae, Callie Hernandez, and JJ Soria were cast as new series regulars while Cheryl Hines, Jessie Ennis, Mae Martin, Margaret Cho, Santiago Cabrera, and Shohreh Aghdashloo were cast in recurring capacities. In November 2021, Alanna Ubach joined the cast in a recurring role for the second season. In January 2022, Sharon Stone was cast in a recurring role for the second season.

=== Filming ===
Filming began in November 2019 in Bangkok, Thailand, before continuing in White Plains, New York, in December. On March 12, 2020, Warner Bros. Television shut down production on the series due to the COVID-19 pandemic. Production on the season's remaining two episodes resumed on August 31, 2020, in New York. For the second season, the series relocated its production to California to take advantage of tax incentives provided by the California Film Commission. Cuoco stated that the producers consulted with the team who worked on Orphan Black to film the scenes which involved multiple versions of Cassie and explained that those scenes were shot on a massive sound stage with several body doubles that she would act opposite.

=== Soundtrack ===
Sia's "Angel by the Wings" was featured on the season 1 finale ("Arrivals and Departures").

Cassie's ringtone is a sample of "Two of Hearts" by Stacey Q.

== Release ==
The series premiered on November 26, 2020, with the first three episodes available. On October 20, 2020, an official trailer for the series and the rollout plan of episodes after the premiere were released; two episodes released on December 3, followed by two more episodes on December 10, and then the season finale on December 17. The second season premiered on April 21, 2022, with the first two episodes available immediately, followed by two more episodes on April 28, and one episode debuting on a weekly basis until the season finale on May 26.

In the United Kingdom, the first season was broadcast on Sky One and the second on Sky Max.

The first season began airing on TBS in March 2022.

=== Home media ===
The first and second seasons were released on DVD on November 29, 2022.

== Reception ==
=== Critical response ===
Critical response of The Flight Attendant
Season	Rotten Tomatoes	Metacritic
1	97% (69 reviews)	78 (24 reviews)
2	86% (53 reviews)	76 (21 reviews)

==== Season 1 ====
The first season received mostly positive reviews. On the review aggregator Rotten Tomatoes, it holds a 97% approval rating with an average rating of 7.4/10, based on 69 reviews. The website's critics consensus reads, "Kaley Cuoco shines as a hot mess in The Flight Attendant, an addictively intriguing slice of stylish pulp that will bring mystery aficionados to Cloud Nine." According to Metacritic, which calculated a weighted average score of 78 out of 100 based on 24 critic reviews, the series received "generally favorable reviews".

Reviewing the series for Rolling Stone, Alan Sepinwall gave it 3.5 out of 5 stars and said, "Cuoco is sharp and likable throughout, two necessary ingredients for playing a character who makes a scene wherever she goes."

==== Season 2 ====
The second season also received mostly positive reviews. On Rotten Tomatoes, it has an 86% approval rating with an average rating of 7.15/10, based on 53 reviews. The website's critics consensus states, "While there's some turbulence as The Flight Attendant charters a new course, passengers are in safe hands with Kaley Cuoco's zestful turn and the writers' knack for satisfying twists." On Metacritic, the second season has a weighted average score of 76 out of 100 based on 21 critic reviews, indicating "generally favorable reviews".

=== Awards and nominations ===
Year	Award	Category	Nominee(s)	Result	Ref.
2021	Art Directors Guild Awards	Excellence in Production Design for a One-Hour Contemporary Single-Camera Series	Sara K. White (for "After Dark")	Nominated	
2021	Critics' Choice Television Awards	Best Comedy Series	The Flight Attendant	Nominated	
2021	Critics' Choice Television Awards	Best Actress in a Comedy Series	Kaley Cuoco	Nominated	
2021	Directors Guild of America Awards	Outstanding Directorial Achievement in Comedy Series	Susanna Fogel (for "In Case of Emergency")	Won	
2021	Golden Globe Awards	Best Television Series – Musical or Comedy	The Flight Attendant	Nominated	
2021	Golden Globe Awards	Best Actress – Television Series Musical or Comedy	Kaley Cuoco	Nominated	
2021	Hollywood Critics Association TV Awards	Best Streaming Series, Comedy	The Flight Attendant	Nominated	
2021	Hollywood Critics Association TV Awards	Best Actress in a Streaming Series, Comedy	Kaley Cuoco	Nominated	
2021	Hollywood Critics Association TV Awards	Best Supporting Actress in a Streaming Series, Comedy	Rosie Perez	Nominated	
2021	Motion Picture Sound Editors Awards	Outstanding Achievement in Sound Editing – Episodic Short Form – Dialogue/ADR	Mike Marchain, Julie Altus, Vince Tennant and Doug Mountain (for "Other People's Houses")	Nominated	
2021	Primetime Emmy Awards	Outstanding Comedy Series	Greg Berlanti, Kaley Cuoco, Steve Yockey, Meredith Lavender, Marcie Ulin, Sarah Schechter, Suzanne McCormack, Jess Meyer, Raymond Quinlan, Jennifer Lence and Erika Kennair	Nominated	
2021	Primetime Emmy Awards	Outstanding Lead Actress in a Comedy Series	Kaley Cuoco	Nominated	
2021	Primetime Emmy Awards	Outstanding Supporting Actress in a Comedy Series	Rosie Perez	Nominated	
2021	Primetime Emmy Awards	Outstanding Directing for a Comedy Series	Susanna Fogel (for "In Case of Emergency")	Nominated	
2021	Primetime Emmy Awards	Outstanding Writing for a Comedy Series	Steve Yockey (for "In Case of Emergency")	Nominated	
2021	Primetime Creative Arts Emmy Awards	Outstanding Casting for a Comedy Series	Kim Miscia, Beth Bowling and John Papsidera	Nominated	
2021	Primetime Creative Arts Emmy Awards	Outstanding Production Design for a Narrative Contemporary Program (One Hour or More)	Sara K. White (for "After Dark")	Nominated	
2021	Primetime Creative Arts Emmy Awards	Outstanding Single-Camera Picture Editing for a Comedy Series	Heather Persons (for "In Case of Emergency")	Nominated	
2021	Primetime Creative Arts Emmy Awards	Outstanding Original Main Title Theme Music	Blake Neely	Won	
2021	Producers Guild of America Awards	Danny Thomas Award for Outstanding Producer of Episodic Television – Comedy	Greg Berlanti, Kaley Cuoco, Steve Yockey, Meredith Lavender, Marcie Ulin, Sarah Schechter, Suzanne McCormack, Jess Meyer, Raymond Quinlan, Jennifer Lence and Erika Kennair	Nominated	
2021	Screen Actors Guild Awards	Outstanding Performance by an Ensemble in a Comedy Series	Kaley Cuoco, Merle Dandridge, Nolan Gerard Funk, Michelle Gomez, Michiel Huisman, Yasha Jackson, Jason Jones, T.R. Knight, Zosia Mamet, Audrey Grace Marshall, Griffin Matthews, Rosie Perez, Terry Serpico and Colin Woodell	Nominated	
2021	Screen Actors Guild Awards	Outstanding Performance by a Female Actor in a Comedy Series	Kaley Cuoco	Nominated	
2021	Television Critics Association Awards	Outstanding Achievement in Comedy	The Flight Attendant	Nominated	
2021	Television Critics Association Awards	Outstanding New Program	The Flight Attendant	Nominated	
2021	Television Critics Association Awards	Individual Achievement in Comedy	Kaley Cuoco	Nominated	
2021	Writers Guild of America Awards	New Series	Kara Lee Corthron, Michael Foley, Ryan Jennifer Jones, Ticona S. Joy, Meredith Lavender, Jess Meyer, Daniele Nathanson, Marcie Ulin, Ian Weinreich and Steve Yockey	Nominated	
2022	Hollywood Critics Association TV Awards	Best Actress in a Streaming Series, Comedy	Kaley Cuoco	Nominated	
2022	Primetime Emmy Awards	Outstanding Lead Actress in a Comedy Series	Kaley Cuoco	Nominated	
2022	Primetime Creative Arts Emmy Awards	Outstanding Music Composition for a Series (Original Dramatic Score)	Blake Neely (for "The Reykjavík Ice Sculpture Festival Is Lovely This Time Of Year")	Nominated	
2022	Primetime Creative Arts Emmy Awards	Outstanding Production Design for a Narrative Contemporary Program (One Hour or More)	Nina Ruscio, Josh Lusby, Mari Lappalainen and Matt Callahan (for "Seeing Double")	Nominated	
2023	Critics' Choice Awards	Best Actress in a Comedy Series	Kaley Cuoco	Nominated	
2023	Golden Globe Awards	Best Actress – Television Series Musical or Comedy	Kaley Cuoco	Nominated	

=== Audience viewership ===
According to TVLine, The Flight Attendant became the HBO Max's biggest debut of all time, until it was surpassed by the Gossip Girl reboot in 2021. According to HBO Max, the first season "saw week over week growth and ranked as HBO Max’s No. 1 series overall during its run."
