= Skeletons at the Feast =

2008 novel by Chris Bohjalian

- First edition
- Author: Chris Bohjalian
- Language: English
- Genre: Fiction
- Published: 2008 by Shaye Areheart
- Publication place: United States
- Media type: Print
- Pages: 372 pp
- ISBN: 978-0-3073-9495-8
- OCLC: 174112672
- Dewey Decimal: 813.54
- LC Class: PS3552.O495

Skeletons at the Feast is a novel by author Chris Bohjalian, published in 2008. It tells the story of a journey in the waning months of World War II concerning the Emmerich family, who flee their beloved home in Prussia and move west to avoid the advancing Russian troops. The family consists of one of the novel's main protagonists, Anna; her mother, known affectionately as "Mutti"; her father, Rolf; her twin brother, Helmut; her younger brother, Theo; and the Scottish POW that once worked on the family's farm, Callum Finella, who later becomes Anna's lover. Anna also has an older brother, Werner, who is off fighting in the war. Rolf and Helmut depart from the family in an effort to stop the Russian advance while the rest continue on alone. On their westward journey the family are joined by Uri Singer, an escaped Jew posing as a Nazi officer.

Bohjalian said in an interview he was inspired to write the story after being persuaded to read a diary spanning from 1920 to 1945 belonging to Eva Henatsch, a German woman that embarked on a similar journey west across the Third Reich.

== Plot summary ==
The plot of the story centers around a young Prussian girl, Anna Emmerich, and the broken remnants of her family as they flee westward from the advancing Russian army. Along with them they are joined by the Scottish POW, Callum Finella, with whom Anna has embarked on a secret love affair. As Anna, her mother, her younger brother Theo, and Callum trek across the Third Reich, other stories run parallel to theirs, including the story of Uri Singer, a Jew that leapt off the train to Auschwitz and survives by assuming identities belonging to various German soldiers; and Cecile, a French Jew taken prisoner in a concentration camp and, along with her fellow prisoners, forced to march westward to outdistance the Russian advance. Eventually all three stories come together when Anna's party, joined by Uri, crosses paths with the sad march of Cecile and the other prisoners. Throughout the novel, Anna struggles with understanding the atrocities the Nazis have committed and how she can possibly bear the burden of blame by the rest of the world.

== Reception ==
The book was reviewed by the Los Angeles Times, USA Today, Kirkus Reviews, The New York Times, and was "highly recommended" by The Historical Novel Society.
