= Kaley Cuoco =

American actress (born 1985)

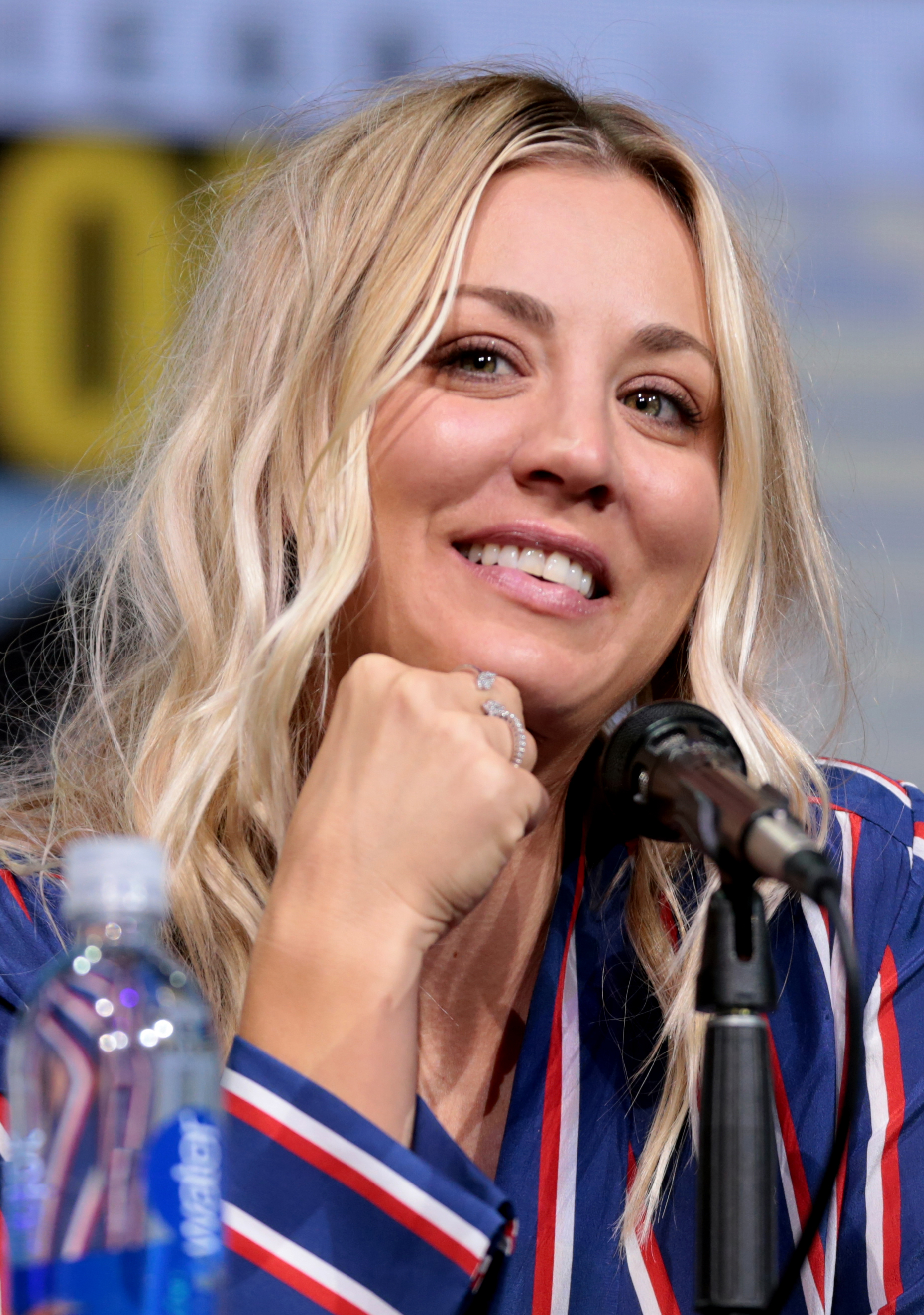
- Cuoco in 2017
- Born: Kaley Christine Cuoco; November 30, 1985 (age 40); Camarillo, California, U.S.
- Other name: Kaley Cuoco-Sweeting
- Occupation: Actress
- Years active: 1992–present
- Spouses: Ryan Sweeting (m. 2013; div. 2016); Karl Cook (m. 2018; div. 2022)
- Partner(s): Tom Pelphrey (2022–present; engaged)
- Children: 2
- Relatives: Briana Cuoco (sister)

Kaley Christine Cuoco (/ˈkwoʊkoʊ/ KWOH-koh; born November 30, 1985) is an American actress. She starred as Bridget Hennessy on the ABC sitcom 8 Simple Rules (2002–2005), Penny on the CBS sitcom The Big Bang Theory (2007–2019), and as the title character in the HBO Max comic thriller The Flight Attendant (2020–2022).

Cuoco has also played Billie Jenkins in the fantasy series Charmed (2005–2006), voiced the title role in the animated series Harley Quinn since 2019, and played the lead role in the comedy thriller series Based on a True Story (2023). Her film work includes Quicksand: No Escape (1992) and Growing Up Brady (2000), as well as Virtuosity (1995), Hop (2011), The Wedding Ringer (2015), The Man from Toronto, Meet Cute (both 2022), and Role Play (2024). She received a star on the Hollywood Walk of Fame in 2014, and in 2017 founded Yes, Norman Productions.

== Early life ==
Kaley Christine Cuoco was born on November 30, 1985, in Camarillo, California. She is the elder daughter of Layne Ann (née Wingate), a homemaker, and Gary Carmine Cuoco, a real estate agent. Her father is of Italian descent while her mother is of English and German ancestry. Her sister, Briana, is an actress and singer who competed on the fifth season of The Voice and co-starred with her on the HBO Max series The Flight Attendant and on Harley Quinn as Barbara Gordon/Batgirl. As a child, Cuoco was a ranked amateur tennis player, a sport she took up when she was three years old. She stopped playing at the age of 16 to pursue a career in acting.

== Career ==
=== 1995–2006: Early work and 8 Simple Rules ===
Cuoco made her first feature film appearance as the young Karin Carter in the 1995 action thriller Virtuosity. In 2000, she portrayed former The Brady Bunch star Maureen McCormick in the TV film Growing Up Brady as well as starring in the Disney Channel original film Alley Cats Strike, and then in 2001, she appeared on the CBS sitcom Ladies Man. In September 2002, she began a starring role as Bridget Hennessy on the ABC sitcom 8 Simple Rules for Dating My Teenage Daughter (afterwards 8 Simple Rules). Bridget was the oldest child, despite Cuoco being six years younger than Amy Davidson, who played her younger sister.

In addition to the final season of 8 Simple Rules, Cuoco had starring roles on the NBC miniseries 10.5, the ABC Family original film Crimes of Fashion, the independent film Debating Robert Lee, and in the film The Hollow at the same time. She also voiced the character of Brandy Harrington, a 14-year-old anthropomorphic mixed-breed dog, on the Disney Channel animated series Brandy & Mr. Whiskers. She voiced the character of Kirstee Smith in Bratz from 2004 to 2005. In the eighth season of the TV series Charmed, she appeared as Billie Jenkins, a powerful young witch with the powers of telekinesis and projection. Executive producer Brad Kern stated that Cuoco's character was initially brought in as a possible spin-off.

=== 2007–2016: The Big Bang Theory and other roles ===
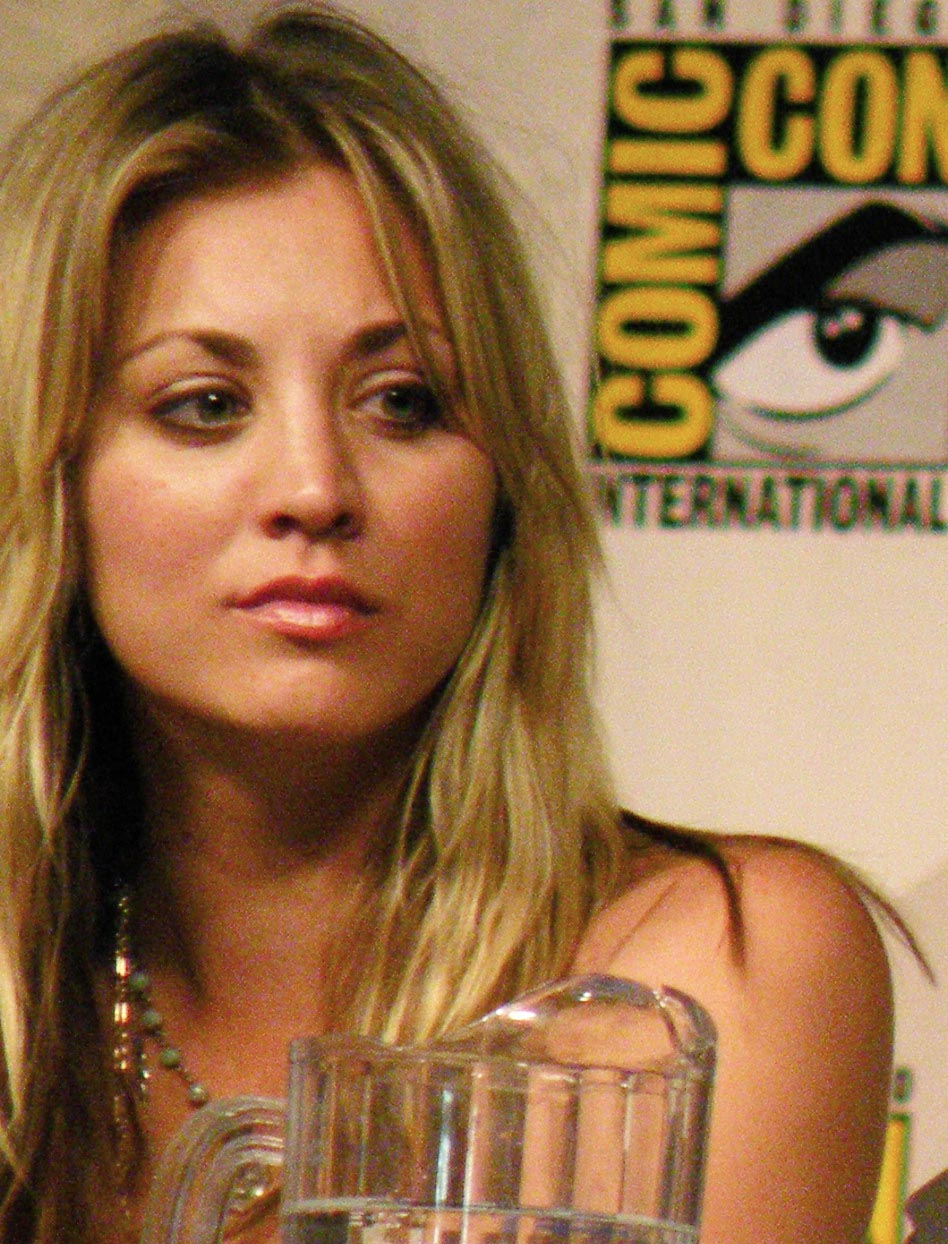
Cuoco at San Diego Comic-Con in July 2009

In September 2007, Cuoco began starring in the CBS sitcom The Big Bang Theory, playing Penny, a Cheesecake Factory employee and aspiring actress who lives across the hall from physicists Dr. Leonard Hofstadter and Dr. Sheldon Cooper. Prior to the 2010–2011 season, she earned US$60,000 an episode for the series, the same as her co-stars. In 2010, the cast negotiated a raise for each actor to make US$200,000 per episode. As of August 2014, Cuoco and her co-stars from The Big Bang Theory Johnny Galecki and Jim Parsons each earned an estimated US$1 million per episode.

In late October 2012, Cuoco enlisted the help of her sister Briana to organize a flash mob on the set of the show, in which she and the cast and crew surprised the studio audience by suddenly lip syncing and dancing to Carly Rae Jepsen's song "Call Me Maybe". A video of the event was posted on YouTube and became a viral success. A clip from the performance was also played during Cuoco's January 8, 2013, appearance on the late-night talk show Conan.

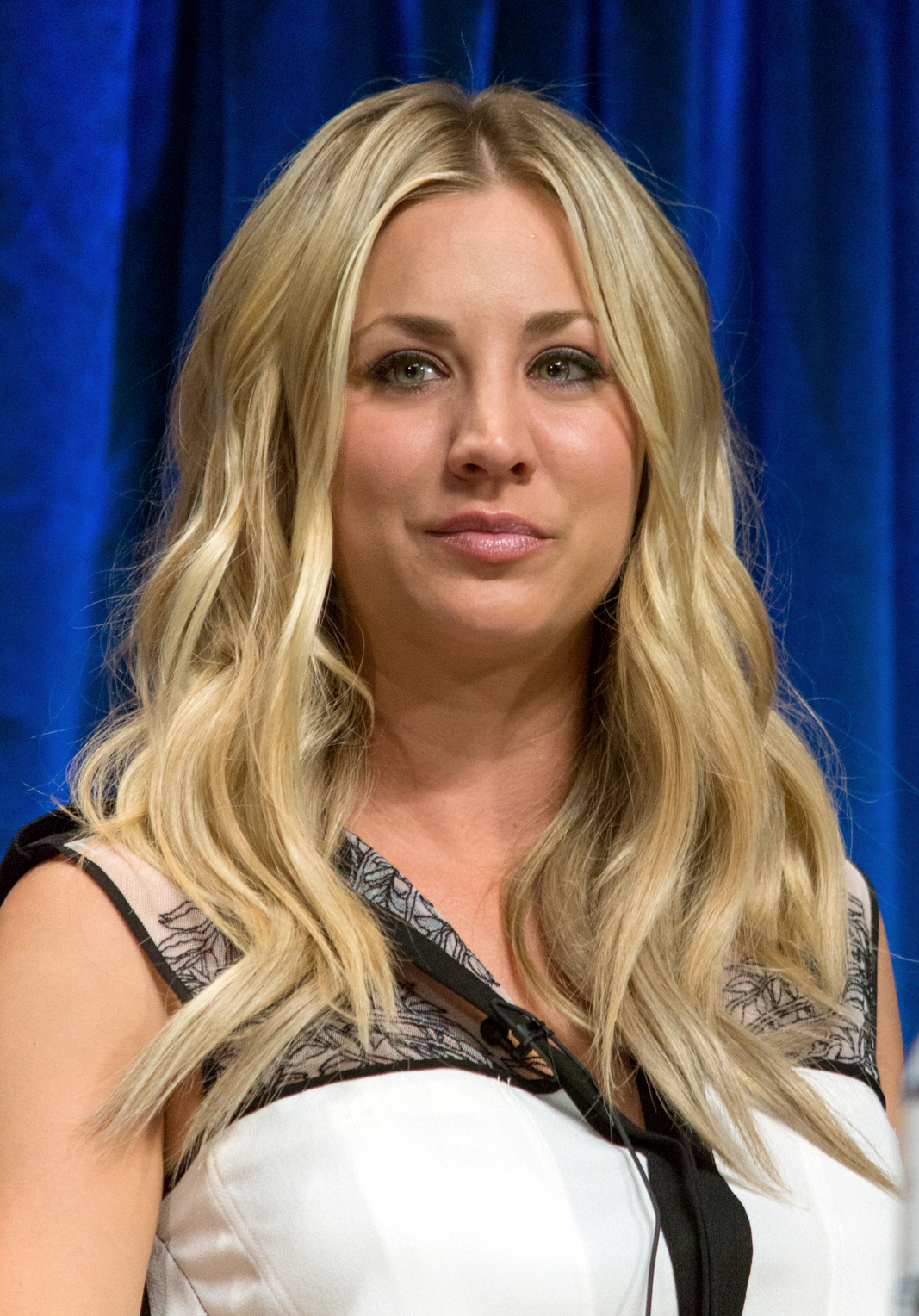
Cuoco at PaleyFest in March 2013

Cuoco starred in the Lifetime film To Be Fat like Me, which premiered on January 8, 2007. She played a minor role in the Prison Break episodes "The Message" and "Chicago", as well as starring in the comedy horror spoof Killer Movie in 2008. She also appeared in the 2010 film The Penthouse. In 2011, she posed nude in Allure magazine's annual "Naked Truth" feature. That same year, she appeared in the films Hop and The Last Ride. She was also chosen to host the Teen Choice Awards in 2011, as well as the People's Choice Awards in 2012 and 2013. She is a regular on Priceline.com commercials as the daughter of William Shatner's character.

=== 2017–present: Harley Quinn animated series and The Flight Attendant ===
In October 2017, Cuoco founded Yes, Norman Productions, a television production company which entered an exclusive multi-year first-look production deal with Warner Bros. Television. Her first project through Yes, Norman was an adaptation of the book The Flight Attendant, written by author Chris Bohjalian, which was developed into a comedy-drama series of the same name. Cuoco starred in the series as Cassie Bowden, and also served as executive producer. The Flight Attendant premiered on November 26, 2020, on WarnerMedia's streaming platform HBO Max to widespread critical acclaim, and was renewed for a second season on December 18, 2020.

In October 2018, it was announced that Cuoco would voice the title character of the DC Universe adult animation series Harley Quinn, and also serve as executive producer. The series premiered on November 29, 2019, to critical acclaim. In September 2020, it was announced that the series was renewed for a third season and would move to HBO Max.

In April 2020, Cuoco joined the cast of the action comedy film The Man from Toronto as the female lead alongside Kevin Hart and Woody Harrelson. During May 2021, her production company expanded its Warner Bros. Television overall deal. In 2023, Cuoco launched an online pet product business called "Oh Norman!".

== Personal life ==
While working on The Big Bang Theory, Cuoco privately dated co-star Johnny Galecki for roughly two years, until December 2009. She later told CBS Watch in September 2010 that they have remained on good terms since ending their relationship.

On September 13, 2010, Cuoco broke her leg in a horse-riding accident and missed the filming of two episodes of The Big Bang Theory.

In October 2011, she became engaged to addiction specialist Josh Resnik, but ended their engagement by March 2012. She became engaged to professional tennis player Ryan Sweeting in September 2013, after three months of dating. They married on December 31, 2013, in Santa Susana, California. On September 25, 2015, it was announced that she and Sweeting had decided to divorce. The divorce was finalized on May 9, 2016.

Cuoco began dating equestrian Karl Cook in late 2016. They became engaged on November 30, 2017, Cuoco's 32nd birthday, and were married on June 30, 2018. In September 2021, the couple announced their separation, stating "we have realized that our current paths have taken us in opposite directions". In June 2022, their divorce was finalized.

Cuoco confirmed her relationship with actor Tom Pelphrey in May 2022. Five months later, she announced on Instagram that they were expecting their first child together. Cuoco gave birth to their daughter Matilda on March 30, 2023. They announced their engagement on August 14, 2024. The couple's second daughter, Philomena, was born on October 12, 2026.

== Filmography ==
=== Film ===
Year	Title	Role	Notes
1995	Virtuosity	Karin Carter	
1997	Picture Perfect	Little Girl	
1999	Can't Be Heaven	Teresa Powers	
2004	Debating Robert Lee	Maralee Rodgers	
2005	Lucky 13	Sarah Baker	
2006	Wasted	Katie Cooning	
2006	Bratz Passion 4 Fashion – Diamondz	Kirstee Smith	Voice
2006	Bratz: Genie Magic	Kirstee Smith	Voice
2007	Cougar Club	Amanda	
2008	Killer Movie	Blanca Champion	
2010	The Penthouse	Erica Roc	
2011	Hop	Sam O'Hare	
2011	The Last Ride	Wanda	
2014	Authors Anonymous	Hannah Rinaldi	Also executive producer
2014	A Million Ways to Die in the West	Woman in the Store	Unrated version
2015	The Wedding Ringer	Gretchen Palmer	
2015	Burning Bodhi	Katy	
2015	Alvin and the Chipmunks: The Road Chip	Eleanor	Voice
2016	Why Him?	Justine	Voice
2017	Handsome	Herself	
2022	The Man from Toronto	Anne	
2022	Meet Cute	Sheila	Also executive producer
2024	Role Play	Emma	Also producer

=== Television ===
Year	Title	Role	Notes
1992	Quicksand: No Escape	Connie Reinhardt	Television film
1994	My So-Called Life	Young Angela Chase	Episode: "Father Figures"
1994	Northern Exposure	Miranda	Episode: "Hello, I Love You"
1996	Ellen	Little Ellen Morgan	Episode: "The Bubble Gum Incident"
1997	Toothless	Lori	Television film
1998	Mr. Murder	Charlotte Stillwater	Miniseries
1998	The Tony Danza Show	Pammie Green	Episode: "Mini-pause"
2000	Don't Forget Your Toothbrush	Ashley	Episode: "March 12, 2000"
2000	Alley Cats Strike	Elisa Bowers	Television film
2000	Growing Up Brady	Maureen McCormick	Television film
2001	Ladies Man	Bonnie Stiles	Main role
2001	7th Heaven	Lynn	Episode: "Relationships"
2002	First Monday	Alyssa	Episode: "Pilot"
2002	The Ellen Show	Vanessa	Episode: "Shallow Gal"
2002	The Nightmare Room	Kristin Ferris	Episode: "My Name is Evil"
2002–2005	8 Simple Rules	Bridget Hennessy	Main role
2004	The Help	Carly Michaels	Episode: "Pilot"
2004	10.5	Amanda Williams	2 episodes
2004	Punk'd	Herself	Episode: "May 9, 2004"
2004	Crimes of Fashion	Brooke Sarto	Television film
2004–2006	Brandy & Mr. Whiskers	Brandy Harrington	Voice, main role
2004	The Hollow	Karen	Television film
2004	Complete Savages	Erin	Episode: "For Whom the Cell Tolls"
2005–2006	Bratz	Kirstee Smith	Voice, main role
2005–2007	Loonatics Unleashed	Paula Hayes / Weather Vane	Voice, 3 episodes
2005–2006	Charmed	Billie Jenkins	Main role
2007	To Be Fat like Me	Alyson Schmidt	Television film
2007	Prison Break	Sasha Murray	2 episodes
2007–2019	The Big Bang Theory	Penny	Main role
2012	Drew Peterson: Untouchable	Stacy Peterson	Television film
2016	Comedy Bang! Bang!	Herself	Episode: "Kaley Cuoco Wears a Black Blazer and Slip on Sneakers"
2016	Lip Sync Battle	Herself	Episode: "Josh Gad vs. Kaley Cuoco"
2018	Best.Worst.Weekend.Ever.	Herself	Episode: "Issue 8"
2019–present	Harley Quinn	Dr. Harleen Quinzel / Harley Quinn	Voice, main role; also executive producer
2019	Young Sheldon	Pool Water	Voice, episode: "Teenager Soup and a Little Ball of Fib"
2020–2022	The Flight Attendant	Cassie Bowden	Main role; also executive producer
2021	Curb Your Enthusiasm	Heidi	Episode: "The Watermelon"
2023–2024	Based on a True Story	Ava Bartlett	Main role; also executive producer
2024	Kite Man: Hell Yeah!	Dr. Harleen Quinzel / Harley Quinn	Voice, episode: "Pilot, Hell Yeah!"; also executive producer
2026	Vanished	Alice Monroe	Main role; also executive producer
2026	Life, Larry and the Pursuit of Unhappiness	Gloria (Widow)	Episode: "Farewell"
2026	Stuart Fails to Save the Universe	Penny	2 episodes

== Awards and nominations ==
Year	Award	Category	Work	Result	Ref.
1993	Young Artist Awards	Best Young Actress in a Cable Movie	Quicksand: No Escape	Nominated	
2000	Young Artist Awards	Best Young Actress in a Mini-Series/Made for TV Film	Growing Up Brady	Nominated	
2003	Young Artist Awards	Best Performance in a TV Series (Comedy or Drama) – Leading Young Actress	8 Simple Rules	Nominated	
2003	Teen Choice Awards	Choice TV Actress: Comedy	8 Simple Rules	Nominated	
2003	Teen Choice Awards	Choice TV Breakout Star: Female	8 Simple Rules	Won	
2004	Teen Choice Awards	Choice TV Actress: Comedy	8 Simple Rules	Nominated	
2004	Young Artist Awards	Best Young Adult Performer in a Teenage Role	8 Simple Rules	Nominated	
2010	Teen Choice Awards	Choice TV Actress: Comedy	The Big Bang Theory	Nominated	
2011	Teen Choice Awards	Choice TV Actress: Comedy	The Big Bang Theory	Nominated	
2012	People's Choice Awards	Favorite TV Comedy Actress	The Big Bang Theory	Nominated	
2012	Teen Choice Awards	Choice TV Actress: Comedy	The Big Bang Theory	Nominated	
2012	Satellite Awards	Best Actress – Television Series Musical or Comedy	The Big Bang Theory	Won	
2013	Teen Choice Awards	Choice TV Actress: Comedy	The Big Bang Theory	Nominated	
2013	People's Choice Awards	Favorite TV Comedy Actress	The Big Bang Theory	Nominated	
2013	Critics' Choice Television Awards	Best Supporting Actress in a Comedy Series	The Big Bang Theory	Won (tied with Eden Sher)	
2014	People's Choice Awards	Favorite TV Comedy Actress	The Big Bang Theory	Won	
2014	Kids' Choice Awards	Favorite Funny Star	The Big Bang Theory	Nominated	
2014	Critics' Choice Television Awards	Best Supporting Actress in a Comedy Series	The Big Bang Theory	Nominated	
2015	People's Choice Awards	Favorite TV Comedy Actress	The Big Bang Theory	Won	
2015	Kids' Choice Awards	Favorite TV Actress	The Big Bang Theory	Nominated	
2015	Teen Choice Awards	Choice TV Actress: Comedy	The Big Bang Theory	Nominated	
2016	Golden Raspberry Awards	Worst Supporting Actress	Alvin and the Chipmunks: The Road Chip The Wedding Ringer	Won	
2019	Teen Choice Awards	Choice Comedy TV Actress	The Big Bang Theory	Nominated	
2021	Critics' Choice Super Awards	Best Voice Actress in an Animated Series	Harley Quinn	Won	
2021	Critics' Choice Television Awards	Best Actress in a Comedy Series	The Flight Attendant	Nominated	
2021	Golden Globe Awards	Best Television Series – Musical or Comedy (as executive producer)	The Flight Attendant	Nominated	
2021	Golden Globe Awards	Best Actress – Television Series Musical or Comedy	The Flight Attendant	Nominated	
2021	Screen Actors Guild Awards	Outstanding Performance by a Female Actor in a Comedy Series	The Flight Attendant	Nominated	
2021	Screen Actors Guild Awards	Outstanding Performance by an Ensemble in a Comedy Series	The Flight Attendant	Nominated	
2021	Producers Guild of America Awards	Outstanding Producer of Episodic Television, Comedy	The Flight Attendant	Nominated	
2021	Primetime Emmy Awards	Outstanding Comedy Series (as executive producer)	The Flight Attendant	Nominated	
2021	Primetime Emmy Awards	Outstanding Lead Actress in a Comedy Series	The Flight Attendant	Nominated	
2021	Hollywood Critics Association TV Awards	Best Actress in a Streaming Series, Comedy	The Flight Attendant	Nominated	
2021	Television Critics Association Awards	Individual Achievement in Comedy	The Flight Attendant	Nominated	
2022	Primetime Emmy Awards	Outstanding Lead Actress in a Comedy Series	The Flight Attendant	Nominated	
2022	Hollywood Critics Association TV Awards	Best Actress in a Streaming Series, Comedy	The Flight Attendant	Nominated	
2023	Critics' Choice Television Awards	Best Actress in a Comedy Series	The Flight Attendant	Nominated	
2023	Golden Globe Awards	Best Actress – Television Series Musical or Comedy	The Flight Attendant	Nominated	
