= 6th Golden Satellite Awards =

Awards ceremony for film and television

- Date: January 19, 2002

Highlights
- Best drama film: In the Bedroom
- Best comedy/musical film: Moulin Rouge!
- Best television drama: 24
- Best television musical/comedy: Sex and the City
- Best director: Baz Luhrmann for Moulin Rouge!

The 6th Golden Satellite Awards were given on January 19, 2002, at the St. Regis Hotel in Los Angeles, California.

== Special achievement awards ==
Mary Pickford Award (for outstanding contribution to the entertainment industry) – Karl Malden

Special Achievement Award (for outstanding devotion & commitment in promoting the best of Israeli films through Israel Film Festival in the United States) – Meir Fenigstein

Outstanding New Talent – Dakota Fanning / Rupert Grint

== Motion picture winners and nominees ==
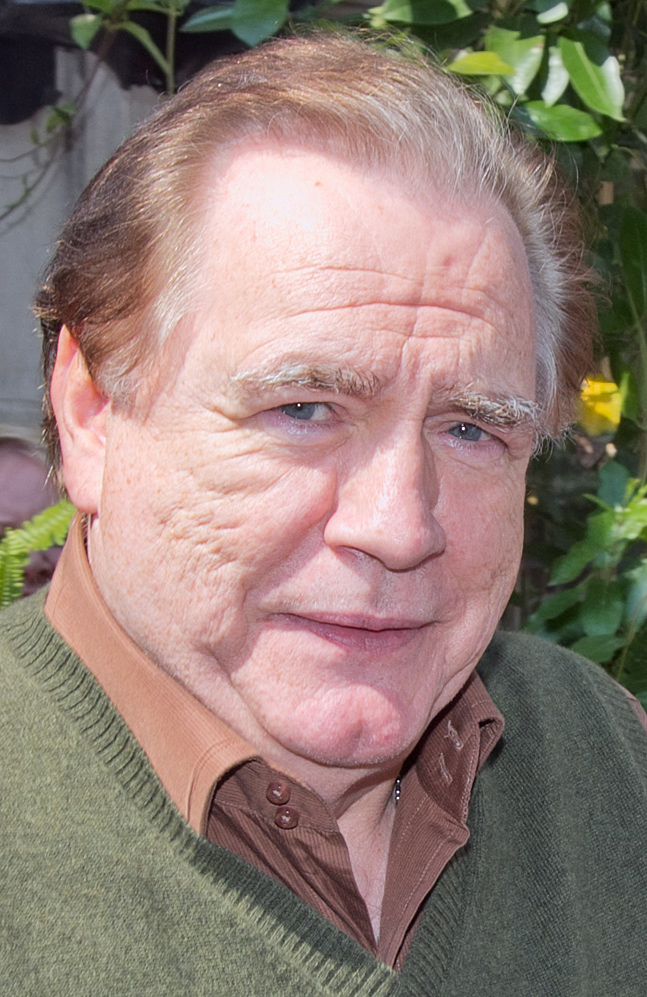
Brian Cox – Best Actor in a Motion Picture, Drama

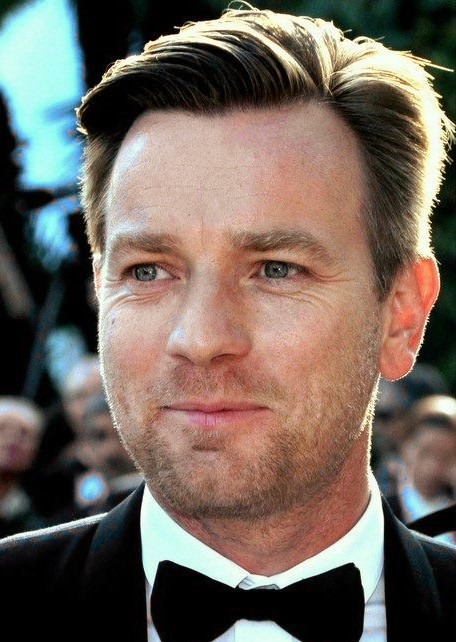
Ewan McGregor – Best Actor in a Motion Picture, Comedy or Musical

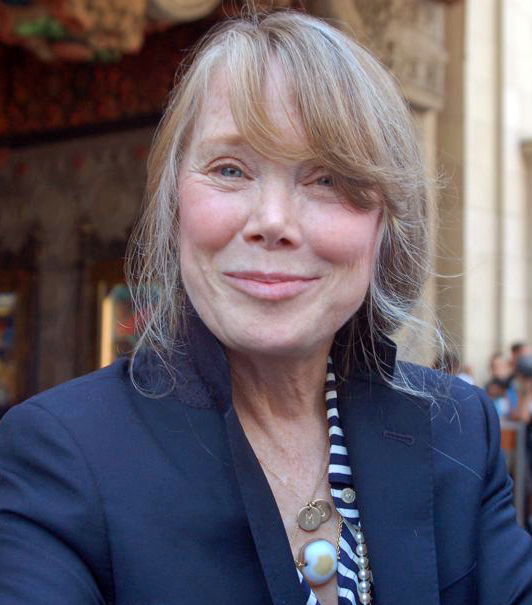
Sissy Spacek – Best Actress in a Motion Picture, Drama

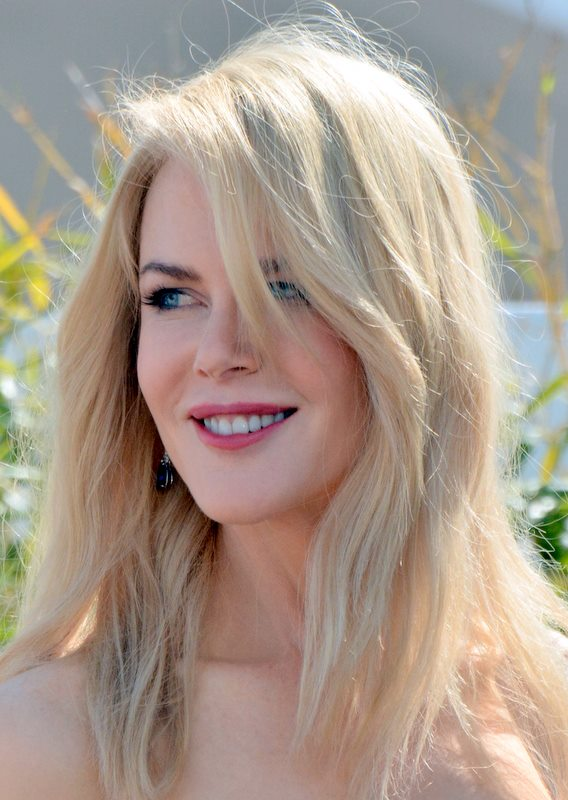
Nicole Kidman – Best Actress in a Motion Picture, Comedy or Musical

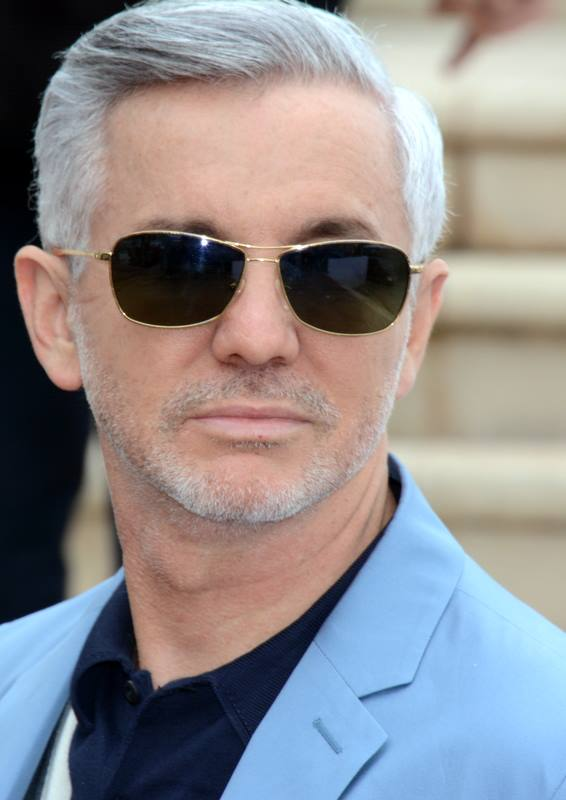
Baz Luhrmann – Best Director

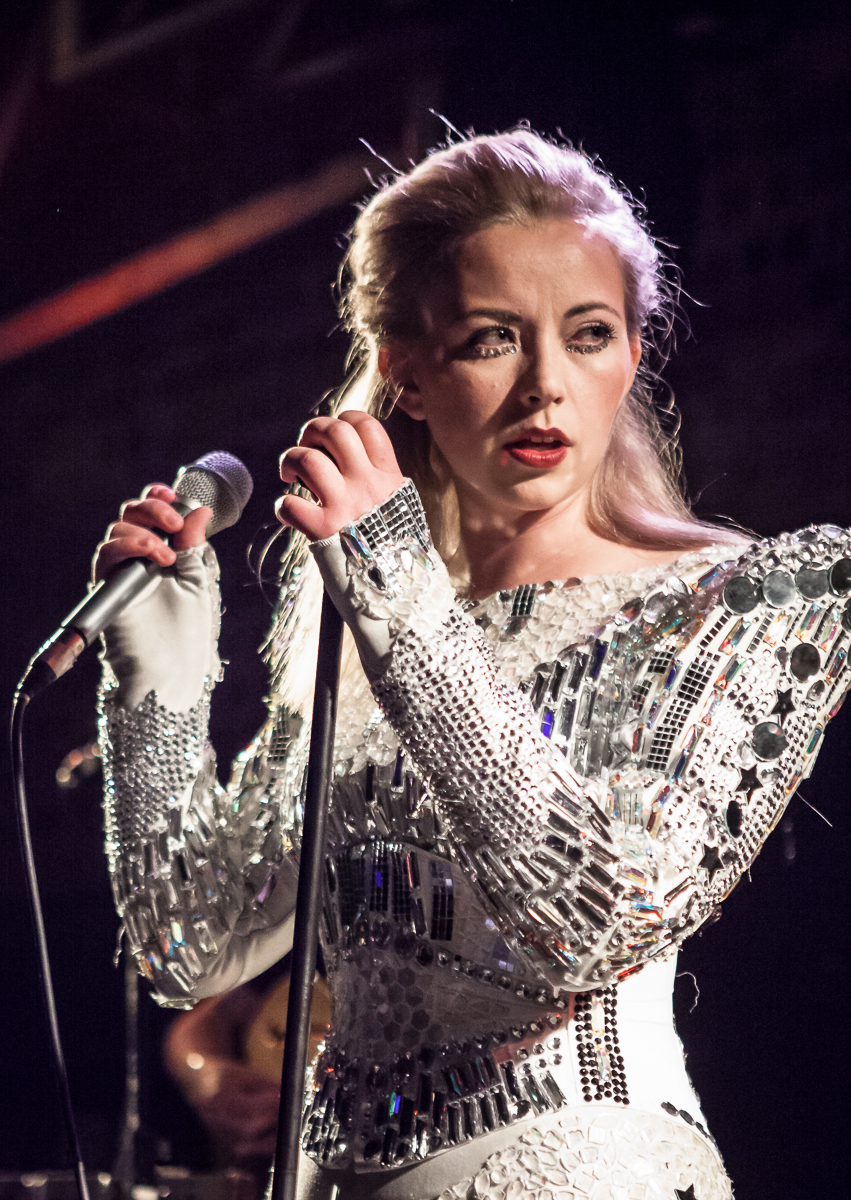
Charlotte Church – Best Original Song "All Love Can Be"

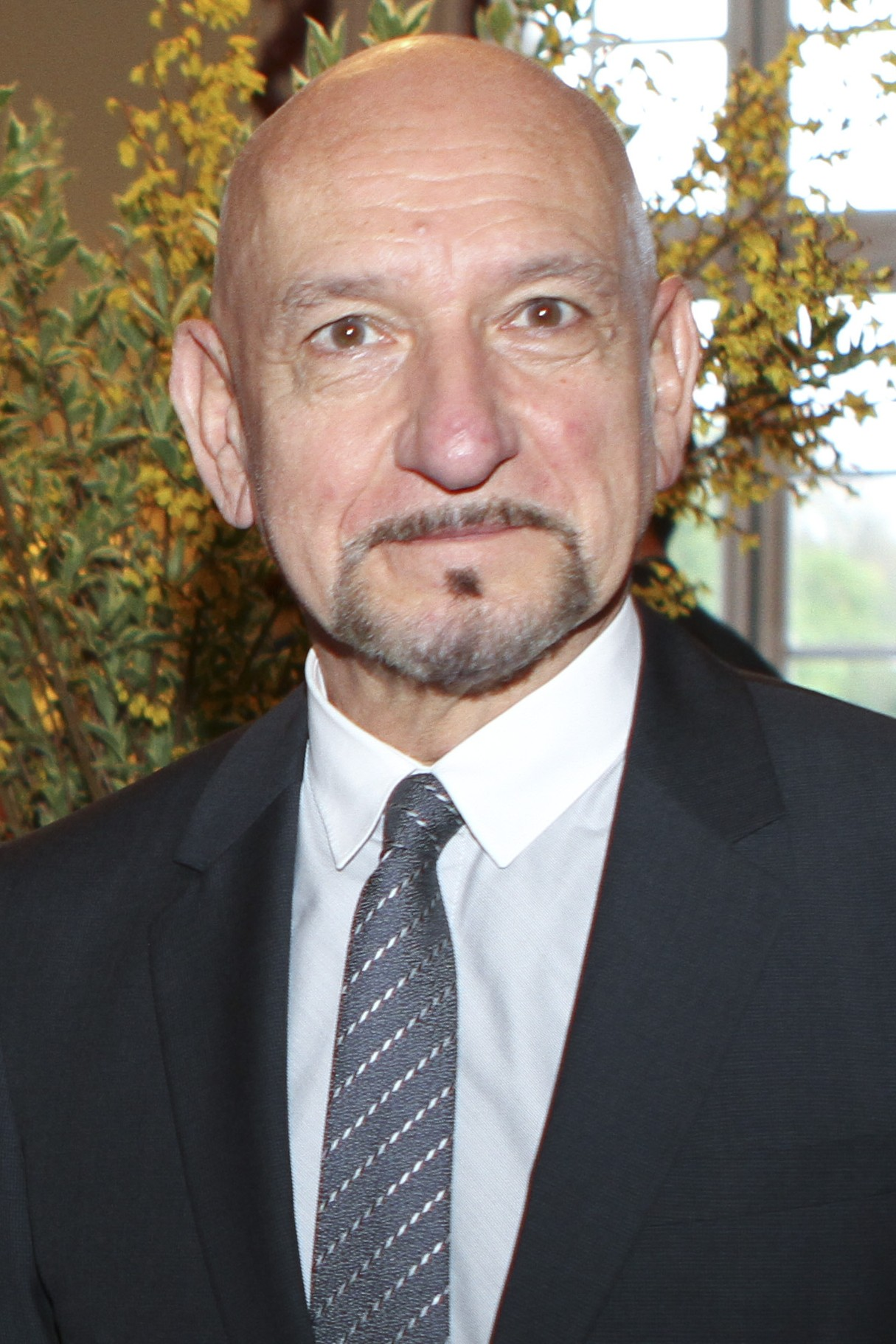
Ben Kingsley – Best Supporting Actor in a Motion Picture, Drama

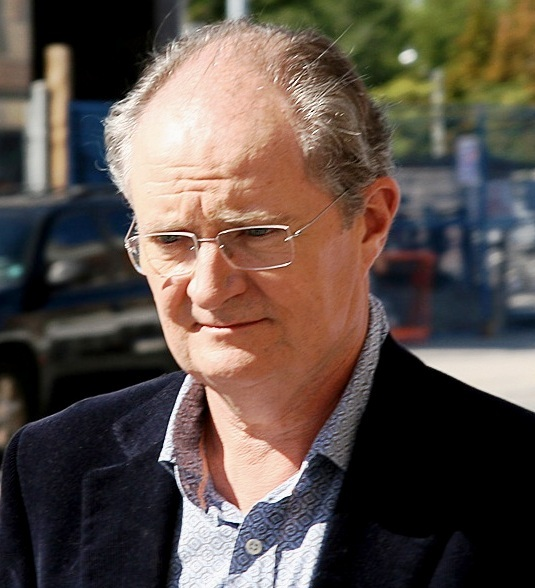
Jim Broadbent – Best Supporting Actor in a Motion Picture, Comedy or Musical

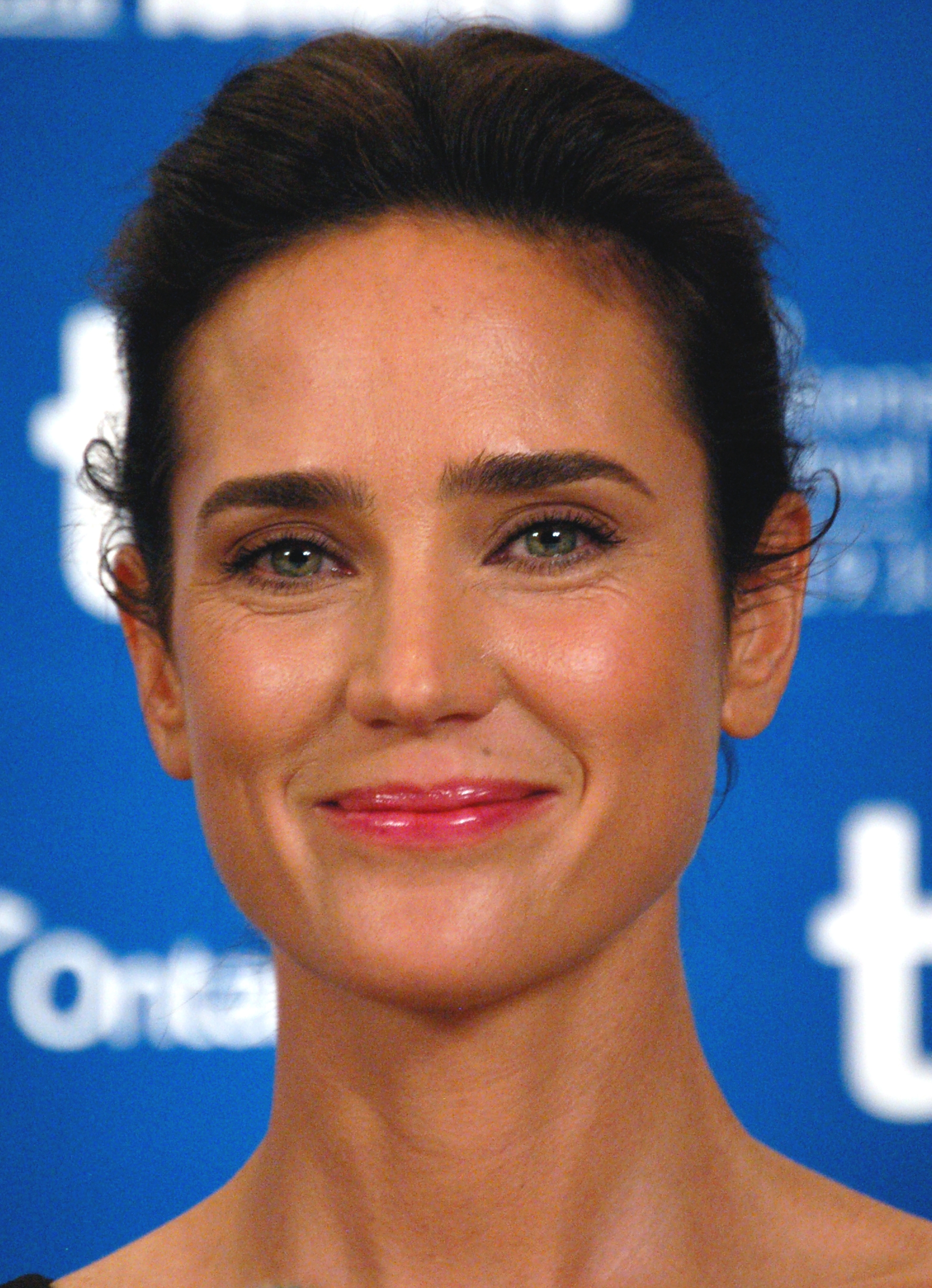
Jennifer Connelly – Best Supporting Actress in a Motion Picture, Drama

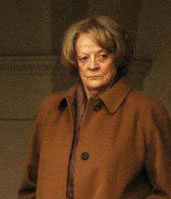
Maggie Smith – Best Supporting Actress in a Motion Picture, Comedy or Musical

=== Best Actor – Drama ===
Brian Cox – L.I.E.

- Russell Crowe – A Beautiful Mind
- Guy Pearce – Memento
- Sean Penn – I Am Sam
- Billy Bob Thornton – Monster's Ball
- Denzel Washington – Training Day

=== Best Actor – Musical or Comedy ===
Ewan McGregor – Moulin Rouge!

- Colin Firth – Bridget Jones's Diary
- Gene Hackman –The Royal Tenenbaums
- John Cameron Mitchell – Hedwig and the Angry Inch
- Ben Stiller – Zoolander
- Chris Tucker – Rush Hour 2

=== Best Actress – Drama ===
Sissy Spacek – In the Bedroom

- Halle Berry – Monster's Ball
- Cate Blanchett – Charlotte Gray
- Judi Dench – Iris
- Nicole Kidman – The Others
- Tilda Swinton – The Deep End

=== Best Actress – Musical or Comedy ===
Nicole Kidman – Moulin Rouge!

- Thora Birch – Ghost World
- Audrey Tautou – Amélie (La fabuleux destin d'Amélie Poulain)
- Sigourney Weaver – Heartbreakers
- Reese Witherspoon – Legally Blonde
- Renée Zellweger – Bridget Jones's Diary

=== Best Animated or Mixed Media Film ===
The Lord of the Rings: The Fellowship of the Ring

- Harry Potter and the Philosopher's Stone
- Jimmy Neutron: Boy Genius
- Monsters, Inc.
- Shrek

=== Best Art Direction ===
Moulin Rouge!

- Gosford Park
- Harry Potter and the Philosopher's Stone
- The Lord of the Rings: The Fellowship of the Ring
- The Others

=== Best Cinematography ===
The Man Who Wasn't There – Roger Deakins

- Hearts in Atlantis
- The Lord of the Rings: The Fellowship of the Ring
- Moulin Rouge!
- Pearl Harbor

=== Best Costume Design ===
Moulin Rouge! – Catherine Martin and Angus Strathie

- The Affair of the Necklace
- From Hell
- The Lord of the Rings: The Fellowship of the Ring
- Planet of the Apes

=== Best Director ===
Baz Luhrmann – Moulin Rouge!

- Jonathan Glazer – Sexy Beast
- John Cameron Mitchell – Hedwig and the Angry Inch
- Christopher Nolan – Memento
- Scott McGehee and David Siegel – The Deep End

=== Best Documentary Film ===
In Cane for Life (A Vida em Cana)

- Calle 54
- My Voyage to Italy (Il mio viaggio in Italia)
- Stanley Kubrick: A Life in Pictures

=== Best Editing ===
The Lord of the Rings: The Fellowship of the Ring – John Gilbert

- Amélie (Le fabuleux destin d'Amélie Poulain)
- A Beautiful Mind
- Harry Potter and the Philosopher's Stone
- Moulin Rouge!

=== Best Film – Drama ===
In the Bedroom

- The Deep End
- Memento
- The Others
- Sexy Beast

=== Best Film – Musical or Comedy ===
Moulin Rouge!

- Bridget Jones's Diary
- Gosford Park
- Hedwig and the Angry Inch
- The Royal Tenenbaums

=== Best Foreign Language Film ===
No Man's Land, Bosnia-Herzegovina

- Amélie (Le fabuleux destin d'Amélie Poulain), France
- Baran, Iran
- Beijing Bicycle (Shiqi sui de dan che), China/France/Taiwan
- Our Lady of the Assassins (La virgen de los sicarios), Colombia/France/Spain
- The Princess and the Warrior (Der Krieger und die Kaiserin), Germany

=== Best Original Score ===
"Moulin Rouge!" – Craig Armstrong

- "A Beautiful Mind" – James Horner
- "Hannibal" – Hans Zimmer
- "Legally Blonde" – Rolfe Kent
- "Spy Game" – Harry Gregson-Williams

=== Best Original Song ===
"All Love Can Be" performed by Charlotte Church – A Beautiful Mind

- "Come What May" – Moulin Rouge!
- "There You'll Be" – Pearl Harbor
- "Vanilla Sky" – Vanilla Sky
- "I Fall Apart" – Vanilla Sky

=== Best Screenplay – Adapted ===
In the Bedroom – Robert Festinger and Todd Field

- A Beautiful Mind – Akiva Goldsman
- Hedwig and the Angry Inch – John Cameron Mitchell
- Last Orders – Fred Schepisi
- The Lord of the Rings: The Fellowship of the Ring – Philippa Boyens, Peter Jackson and Fran Walsh

=== Best Screenplay – Original ===
Monster's Ball – Milo Addica and Will Rokos

- Memento – Christopher Nolan
- Moulin Rouge! – Baz Luhrmann and Craig Pierce
- The Others – Alejandro Amenábar
- Sexy Beast – Louis Mellis and David Scinto

=== Best Sound ===
The Lord of the Rings: The Fellowship of the Ring

- Hedwig and the Angry Inch
- Jurassic Park III
- Moulin Rouge!
- The Others

=== Best Supporting Actor – Drama ===
Ben Kingsley – Sexy Beast

- Jim Broadbent – Iris
- Billy Crudup – Charlotte Gray
- Ed Harris – A Beautiful Mind
- Ian McKellen – The Lord of the Rings: The Fellowship of the Ring
- Goran Visnjic – The Deep End

=== Best Supporting Actor – Musical or Comedy ===
Jim Broadbent – Moulin Rouge!

- Steve Buscemi – Ghost World
- Hugh Grant – Bridget Jones's Diary
- Carl Reiner – Ocean's Eleven
- Ben Stiller – The Royal Tenenbaums
- Owen Wilson – The Royal Tenenbaums

=== Best Supporting Actress – Drama ===
Jennifer Connelly – A Beautiful Mind

- Fionnula Flanagan – The Others
- Brittany Murphy – Don't Say a Word
- Julia Stiles – The Business of Strangers
- Marisa Tomei – In the Bedroom
- Kate Winslet – Iris

=== Best Supporting Actress – Musical or Comedy ===
Maggie Smith – Gosford Park

- Anjelica Huston – The Royal Tenenbaums
- Helen Mirren – Gosford Park
- Gwyneth Paltrow – The Royal Tenenbaums
- Miriam Shor – Hedwig and the Angry Inch
- Emily Watson – Gosford Park

=== Best Visual Effects ===
The Lord of the Rings: The Fellowship of the Ring

- Harry Potter and the Philosopher's Stone
- Jurassic Park III
- Moulin Rouge!
- Pearl Harbor

=== Outstanding Motion Picture Ensemble ===
Gosford Park

== Television winners and nominees ==
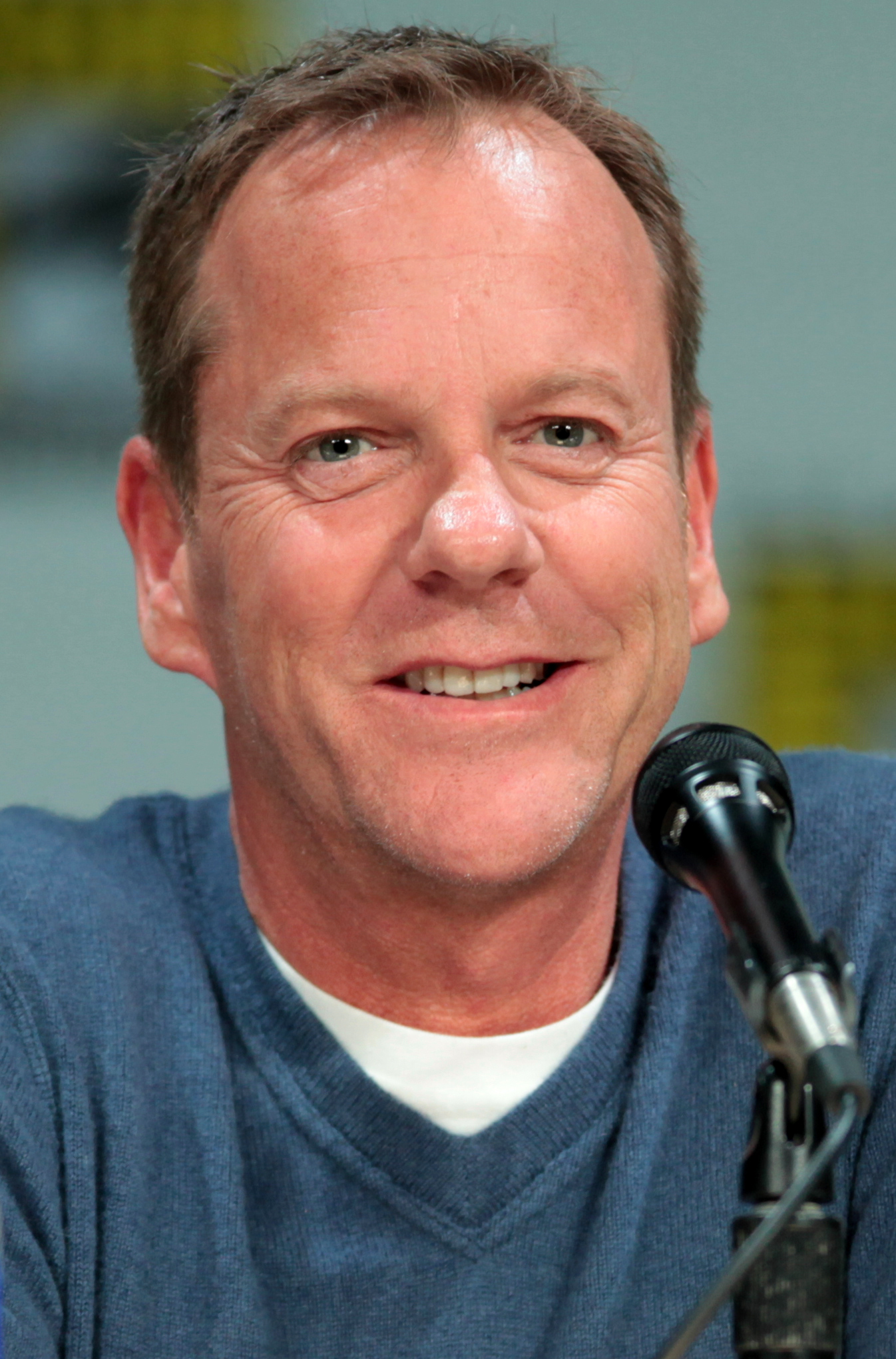
Kiefer Sutherland – Best Actor in a Series, Drama

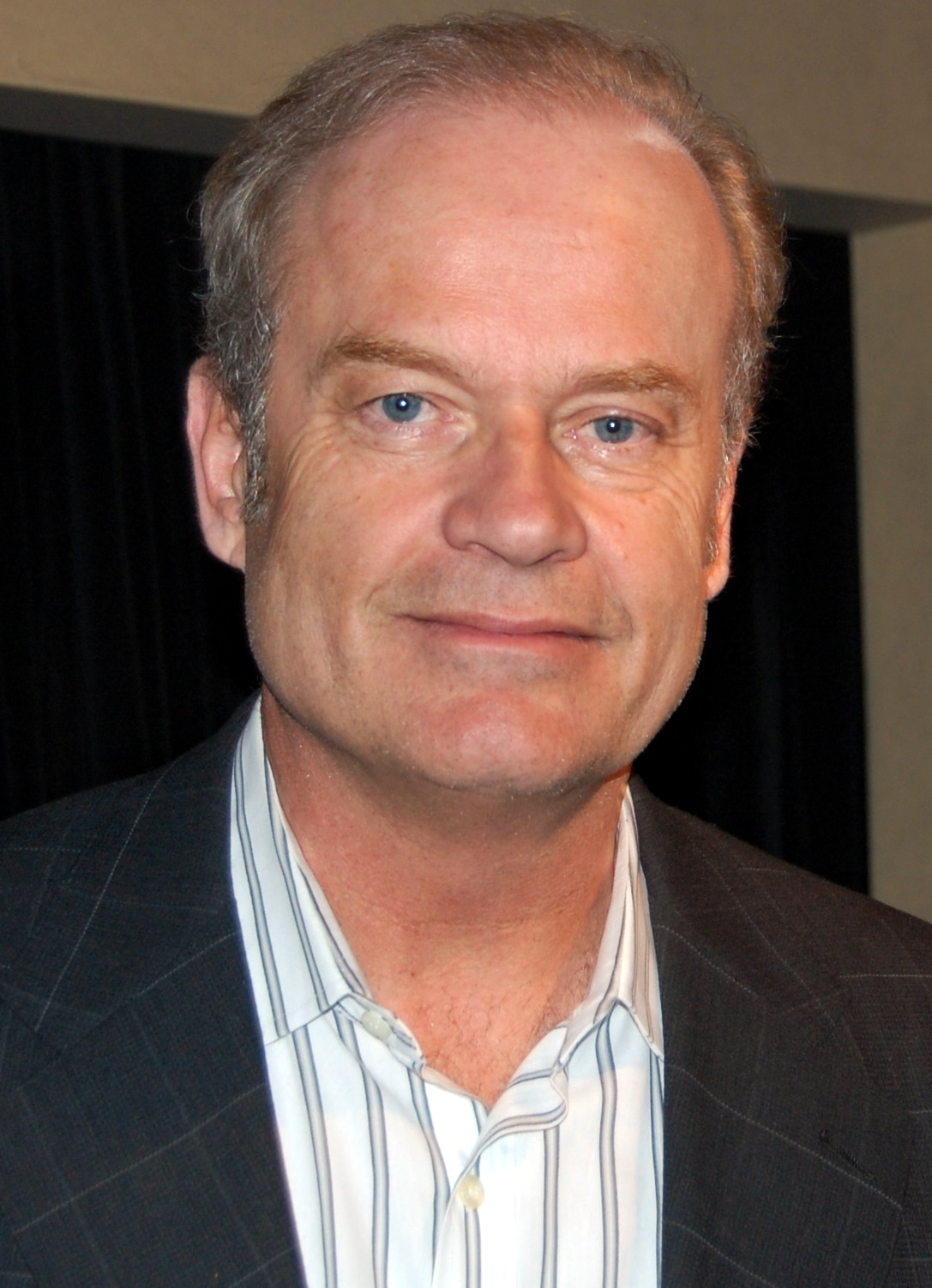
Kelsey Grammer – Best Actor in a Series, Comedy or Musical

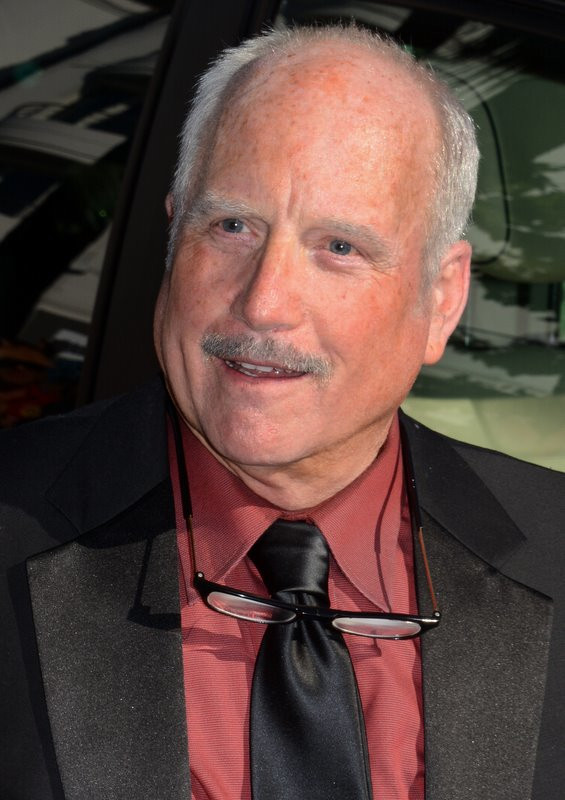
Richard Dreyfuss – Best Actor in a Miniseries or Television Film

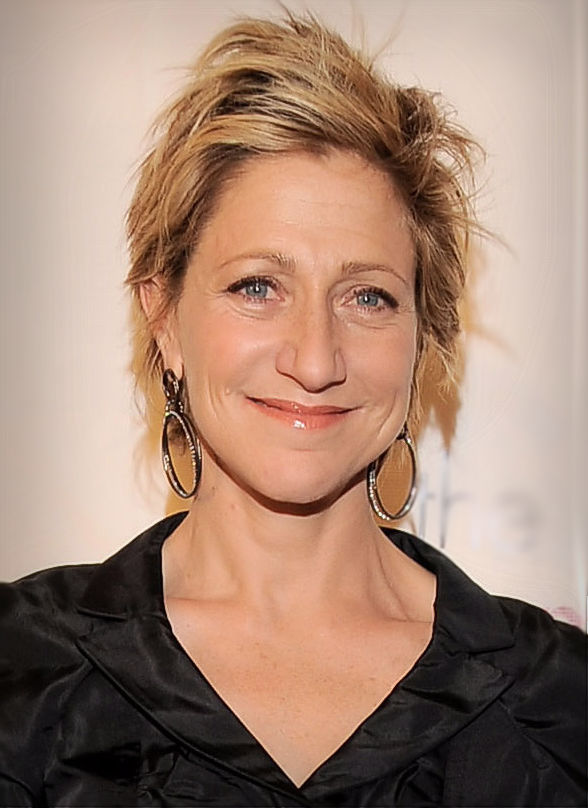
Edie Falco – Best Actress in a Series, Drama

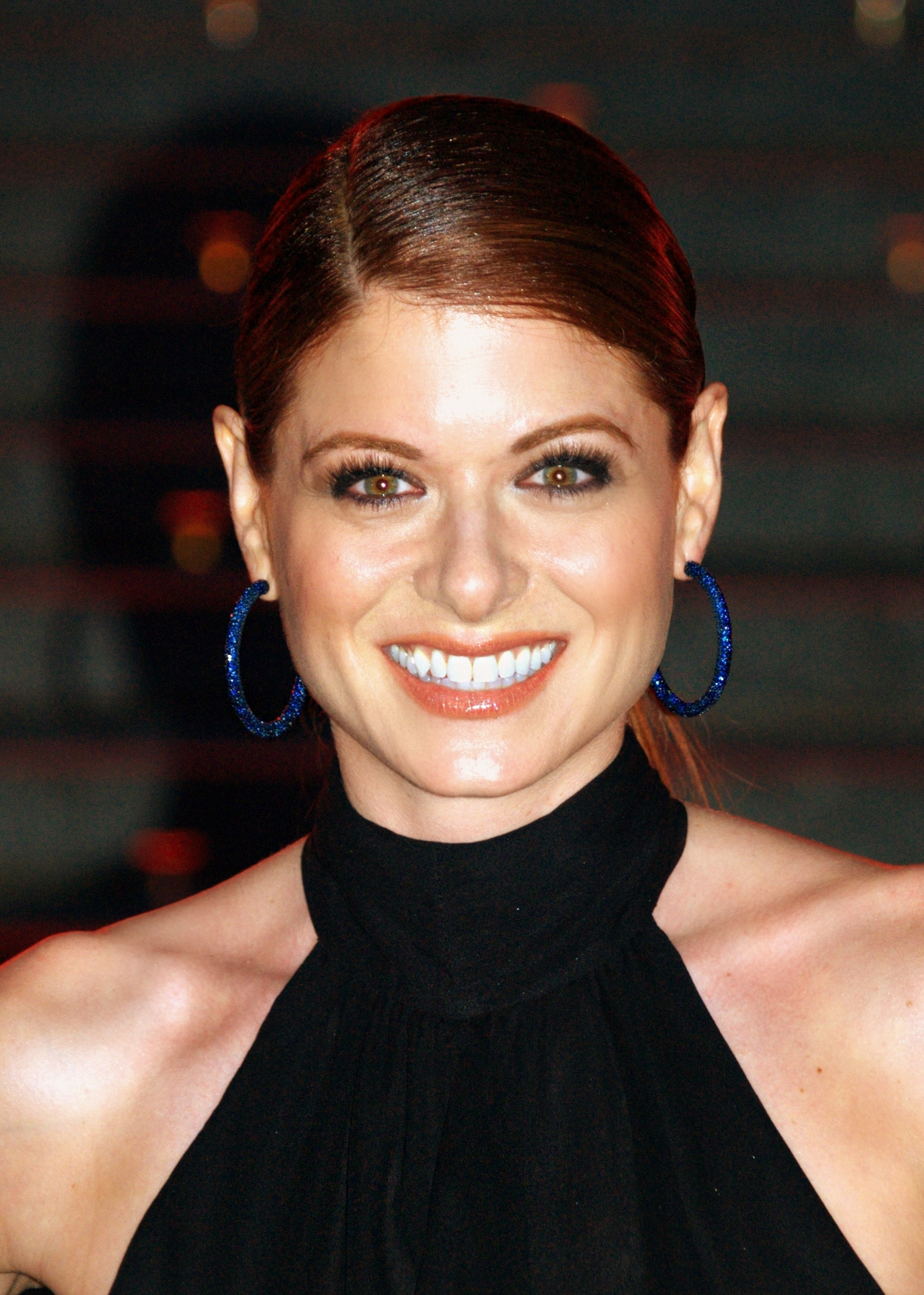
Debra Messing – Best Actress in a Series, Comedy or Musical

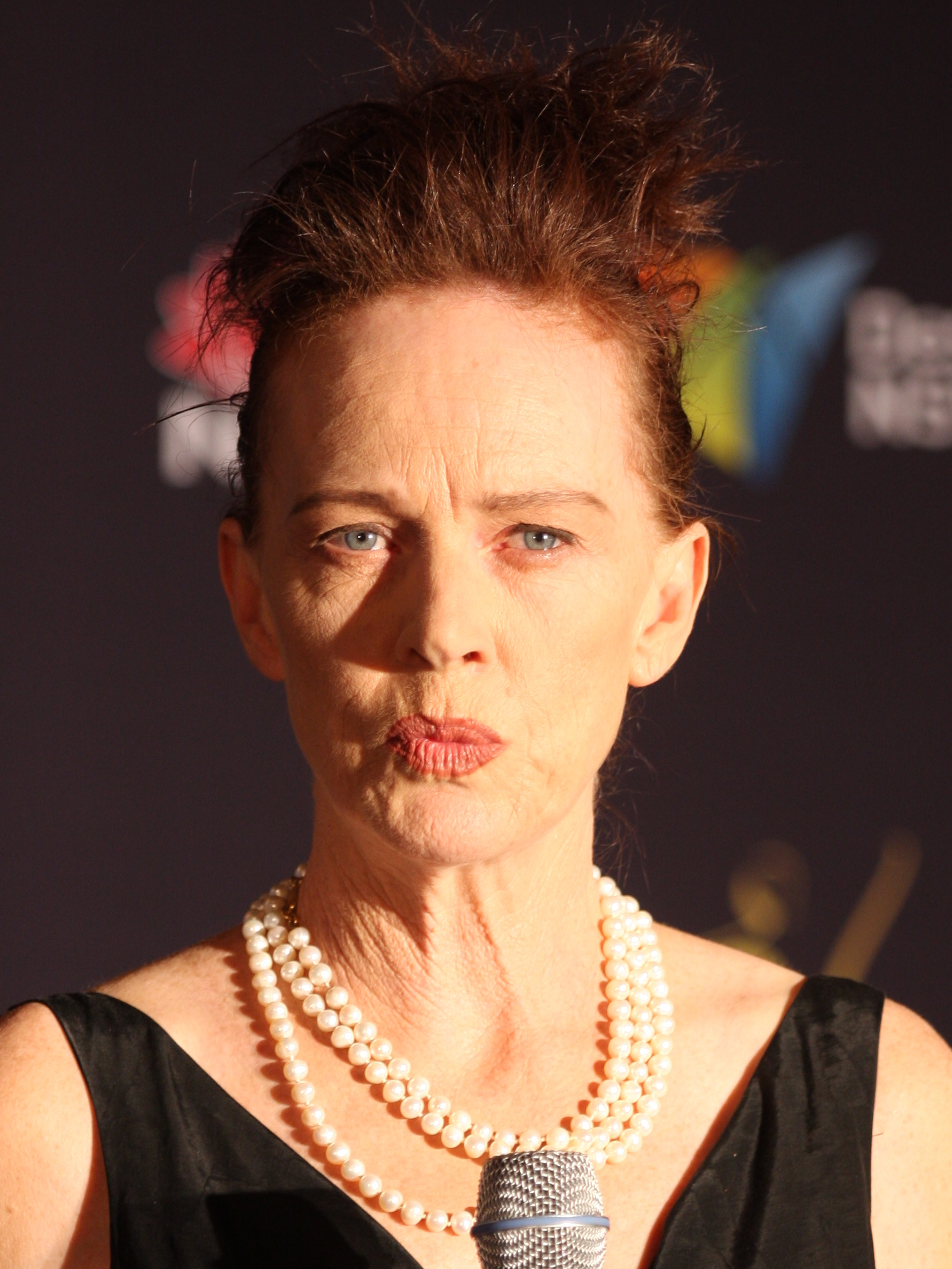
Judy Davis – Best Actress in a Miniseries or Television Film

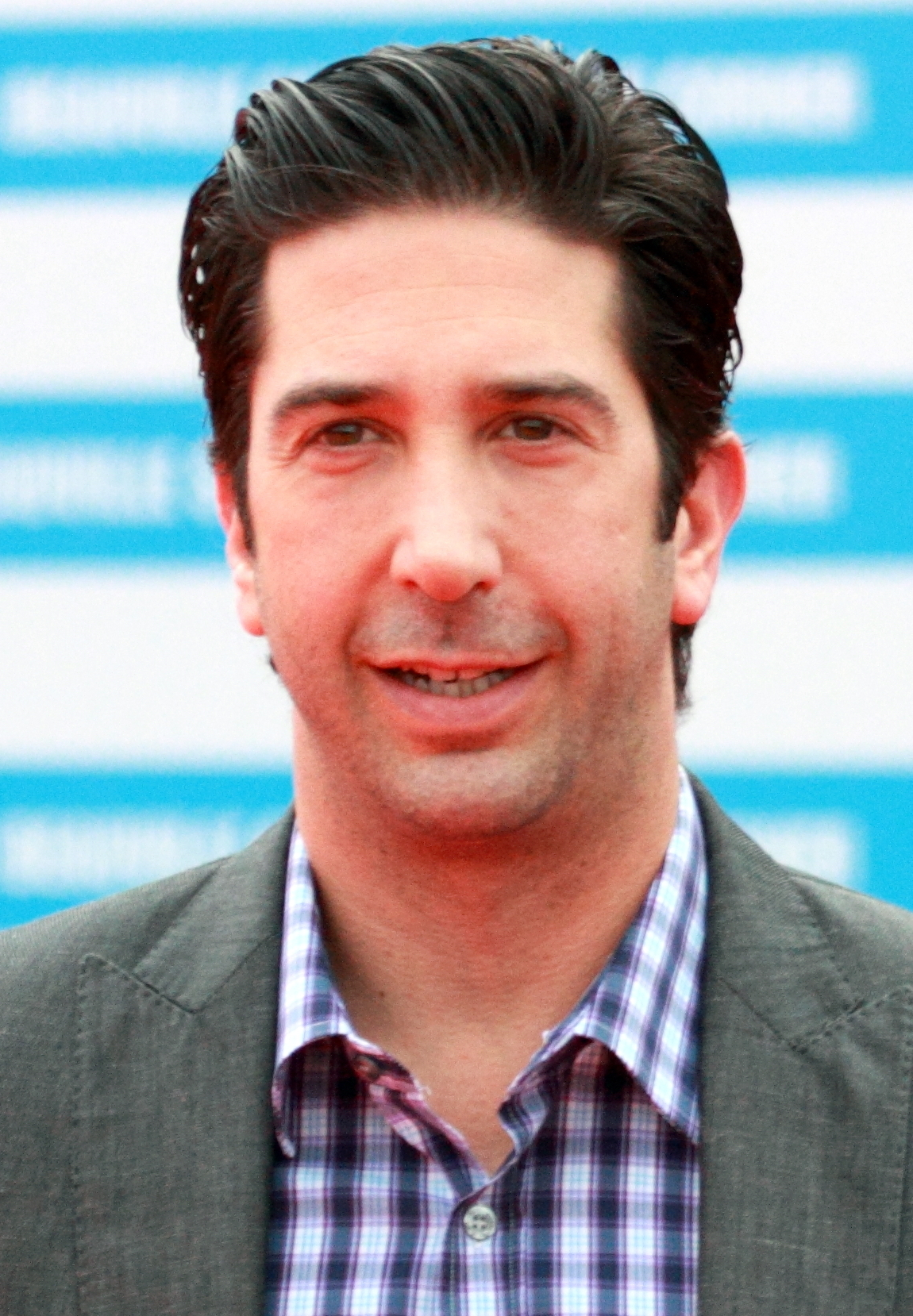
David Schwimmer – Best Supporting Actor in a Series, Miniseries or Television Film

=== Best Actor – Drama Series ===
Kiefer Sutherland – 24

- James Gandolfini – The Sopranos
- Craig T. Nelson – The District
- William Petersen – CSI: Crime Scene Investigation
- Martin Sheen – The West Wing

=== Best Actor – Musical or Comedy Series ===
Kelsey Grammer – Frasier

- Thomas Cavanagh – Ed
- Eric McCormack – Will & Grace
- Ray Romano – Everybody Loves Raymond
- George Segal – Just Shoot Me!

=== Best Actor – Miniseries or TV Film ===
Richard Dreyfuss – The Day Reagan Was Shot

- William Hurt – Varian's War
- Ben Kingsley – Anne Frank: The Whole Story
- Damian Lewis – Band of Brothers
- Jeffrey Wright – Boycott

=== Best Actress – Drama Series ===
Edie Falco – The Sopranos

- Amy Brenneman – Judging Amy
- Kim Delaney – Philly
- Marg Helgenberger – CSI: Crime Scene Investigation
- Sela Ward – Once and Again

=== Best Actress – Musical or Comedy Series ===
Debra Messing – Will & Grace

- Jenna Elfman – Dharma & Greg
- Lauren Graham – Gilmore Girls
- Jane Kaczmarek – Malcolm in the Middle
- Lisa Kudrow – Friends

=== Best Actress – Miniseries or TV Film ===
Judy Davis – Life with Judy Garland: Me and My Shadows

- Laura Linney – Wild Iris
- Sissy Spacek – Midwives
- Hannah Taylor-Gordon – Anne Frank: The Whole Story
- Emma Thompson – Wit

=== Best Miniseries ===
Life with Judy Garland: Me and My Shadows

- Anne Frank: The Whole Story
- Band of Brothers
- Further Tales of the City
- Uprising

=== Best Series – Drama ===
24

- The District
- Six Feet Under
- The Sopranos
- The West Wing

=== Best Series – Musical or Comedy ===
Sex and the City

- Dharma & Greg
- Everybody Loves Raymond
- Frasier
- Friends

=== Best Supporting Actor – (Mini)Series or TV Film ===
David Schwimmer – Band of Brothers

- Billy Campbell – Further Tales of the City
- Cary Elwes – Uprising
- Colin Firth – Conspiracy
- Stanley Tucci – Conspiracy

=== Best Supporting Actress – (Mini)Series or TV Film ===
Julia Ormond – Varian's War

- Tammy Blanchard – Life with Judy Garland: Me and My Shadows
- Brenda Blethyn – Anne Frank: The Whole Story
- Jill Hennessy – Jackie, Ethel, Joan: The Women of Camelot
- Lauren Holly – Jackie, Ethel, Joan: The Women of Camelot

=== Best TV Film ===
The Day Reagan Was Shot

- Conspiracy
- Midwives
- Varian's War
- Wild Iris
- Wit

=== Outstanding Television Ensemble ===
Buffy the Vampire Slayer

== New Media winners and nominees ==
=== Best Internet Site ===
www.bmwfilms.com

- www.cbs.com/latenight/lateshow
- www.cinemanow.com
- www.heavy.com
- www.sputnik7.com

=== Computer Software ===
Final Cut Pro 2.0

- Avid Xpress DV
- Final Draft 5.0
- Macromedia Flash 5.0
- Premiere 6.0

=== Video Game ===
Final Fantasy VIII

- Command & Conquer: Red Alert 2
- Myst, Riven: The Sequel to Myst, and Myst III: Exile (for the Myst series)
- Quake III Arena
- Tony Hawk's Pro Skater 2

== Films and series with multiple wins and nominations ==
=== Film ===
Wins	Nominations	Films
8	14	Moulin Rouge!
4	9	The Lord of the Rings: The Fellowship of the Ring
3	4	In the Bedroom
2	6	Gosford Park
2	7	A Beautiful Mind
1	4	Sexy Beast
1	3	Monster's Ball
0	6	Hedwig and the Angry Inch, The Others, The Royal Tenenbaums
0	4	Bridget Jones's Diary, The Deep End, Memento
0	3	Amélie (La fabuleux destin d'Amélie Poulain), Iris, Harry Potter and the Philosopher's Stone, Pearl Harbor
0	2	Charlotte Gray, Ghost World, Jurassic Park III, Legally Blonde, Vanilla Sky

=== Television ===
Wins	Nominations	Series
2	2	24 and The Day Reagan Was Shot
1	3	Band of Brothers, The Sopranos, Varian's War
1	2	Frasier and Will & Grace
0	4	Anne Frank: The Whole Story
0	3	Conspiracy
0	2	CSI: Crime Scene Investigation, Dharma & Greg, The District, Everybody Loves Raymond, Friends, Further Tales of the City, Jackie, Ethel, Joan: The Women of Camelot, Midwives, Uprising, The West Wing, Wild Iris, Wit
