= Crimes of Fashion =

2004 television film by Stuart Gillard

- DVD cover
- Written by: David Mickel
- Directed by: Stuart Gillard
- Starring: Kaley Cuoco; Dominic Chianese; Megan Fox
- Composer: Michael Wandmacher
- Country of origin: United States
- Original language: English

Production
- Producer: Kevin Lafferty
- Cinematography: Manfred Guthe
- Editor: Robin Russell
- Running time: 90 minutes
- Production companies: Just Singer Entertainment; The Walt Disney Company

Original release
- Network: ABC Family
- Release: July 25, 2004

Crimes of Fashion is a 2004 American crime comedy television film directed by Stuart Gillard. The film stars Kaley Cuoco, Dominic Chianese, and Megan Fox, and premiered on ABC Family on July 25, 2004.

== Premise ==
The movie follows Brooke, a plain but creative and hard-working student at the top fashion school in the nation, who has come a long way from her tough childhood in foster care. Always dreaming of a career in fashion, she is thrilled to finally be on her way. However, when the grandfather she never knew about dies, her life is suddenly turned upside down. Not only has he left her his estate, he left her in charge of the family business, and now she is to be the boss of a mob that is trying to become legit. As if that wasn't not enough, the handsome new student she is falling for may be the one trying to bring her family down.

== Cast ==
- Kaley Cuoco as Brooke Sarto
- Megan Fox as Candace, a fashion designer rival of Brooke's
- Chuck Shamata as Sal Hugo, an enemy mob boss, who is trying to take over the Sarto's territory
- David Sparrow as Bruno, Sal Hugo's bodyguard
- Pat Kelly as Jack Lawton, an FBI agent, who goes undercover
- Dominic Chianese as George, the person who contacts Brooke and helps her become the new mob boss. He has a big secret.
- Tim Rozon as Marcus, a handsome man on whom Brooke has a crush in the earlier part of the film
- James Kall as bartender
