= Role Play =

2024 film by Thomas Vincent

- Release poster
- Directed by: Thomas Vincent
- Written by: Seth Owen
- Produced by: Kaley Cuoco; Alex Heineman; Andrew Rona
- Starring: Kaley Cuoco; David Oyelowo; Rudi Dharmalingam; Connie Nielsen; Bill Nighy
- Cinematography: Maxime Alexandre
- Edited by: Gareth C. Scales
- Music by: Rael Jones
- Production companies: StudioCanal; Picture Company; Studio Babelsberg; Yes, Norman Productions
- Distributed by: Amazon MGM Studios
- Release date: January 12, 2024
- Running time: 101 minutes
- Countries: United States; France; Germany
- Language: English

Role Play is a 2024 action comedy film directed by Thomas Vincent, written by Seth Owen, produced by Andrew Rona and Kaley Cuoco. The film stars Cuoco, David Oyelowo, Rudi Dharmalingam, Connie Nielsen, and Bill Nighy.

Role Play was released on Amazon Prime Video on January 12, 2024.

== Plot ==
Emma leads a double life; Dave's loving wife for seven years and Wyatt and Caroline's mother, but also secretly an assassin. Her frequent “business trips” create a rift in her family life, leading to missed anniversaries and strained attempts to maintain a connection with her loved ones.

Emma's handler Raj calls to update her, trying to tempt her with a high-paying hit. Reminding her to keep a low profile, he has found another ad on the dark web from her former employer Sovereign offering a reward for finding her.

To rekindle their passion, Emma and Dave plan a role-playing game, meeting at a hotel as strangers. It takes a dramatic turn when Emma’s two worlds collide. As she is waiting for Dave, Bob Kitterman introduces himself, having recognised her. Emma continues to use her assumed name, as he repeatedly alludes to their shared profession. Bob mentions his room number and leaves.

The couple continue with their role play and drinking heavily, then head to their room, where Dave promptly falls asleep. Emma sneaks up to Bob's room. Trying to blackmail her, he asks for a sizeable cut of her future hits as his partner. Refusing, citing the 30% she already pays Raj, she reveals she spiked Bob's scotch when they were in the bar. Bob is shortly incapacitated.

Hurrying to their room, Dave apologizes for seemingly falling asleep and they soon head home. Contacting Raj about her blown cover, Emma warns him she's coming to him in Germany. Citing a work emergency in Boise, she flies off to Europe.

On Monday, when Dave goes to collect Emma at the airport, she does not appear and is not registered on the flight. He stays all day in case, and NYPD homicide detectives bring him in for questioning. As they are taking his statement Special Agent Carver from the ITIC enters. She shows Dave that Emma took over the identity of a woman who died 8 years ago, and that she is an assassin.

As soon as Dave arrives home, he finds Emma's passports, guns and other paraphernalia. Carver shows up, asking to come in and look around, so he asks to see a warrant. Meanwhile, Raj picks up Emma at the German airport. He warns her that Sovereign will never let her have a normal life, just as she spots them. Carver gets word that Emma has been found, so leaves Dave.

Emma takes out two Sovereign assassins on foot. Reconnecting with Raj, another shoots at them, inadvertently killing him. Shortly after, Dave calls Raj's mobile and talks with Emma. He insists on coming to Berlin to help her, despite her protests. Upon arriving, Dave sees a driver with the pseudonym he had used in the hotel, and is taken to a small café. There Emma tells him her name used to be Anna. Her father was in the secret service, but later started Sovereign with Carver. When he died, she raised her, training her to be an assassin.

When Emma met Dave in Boston, she fell in love and realised she wanted out. She promises she needs to tie up loose ends, then will stop killing as she simply wants a normal and safe life for them as a family. Four Sovereign employees find and tranquilize them.

Emma wakes in a compound in the forest, hearing her kids. Carver has flown them over, as she convinced Dave's sister Molly to hand them over. She tells Emma she and the kids will be safe once she returns to Sovereign and kills Dave. Taking him for a walk in the woods, Emma has him hold her, so she can whisper that she has to shoot him but promises it won't be fatal. After the gun goes off, he plays dead, then Emma kills the woman who comes to confirm. Next, she takes out the sniper. Back at the compound, Emma takes out another, and sends Dave to watch the kids.

Emma takes out Carver's last mercenary. Taking to the woods, they exchange bullets until Carver goes down. Fatally wounded, she asks Emma to finish her off, but she'd rather let her bleed out. Reuniting with her family, they head out together.

== Cast ==
- Kaley Cuoco as Emma Brackett
- David Oyelowo as Dave Brackett
- Bill Nighy as Bob Ketterman
- Connie Nielsen as Gwen Carver
- Rudi Dharmalingam as Rajendra 'Raj' Bakshi
- Lucia Aliu as Caroline Brackett
- Regan Bryan-Gudgeon as Wyatt Brackett
- Simon Delaney as Toby Berman
- Sonita Henry as Karen Shah
- Jade-Eleena Dregorius as Ji
- Julia Schunevitsch as Salas
- Stephanie Levi-John as Molly
- Steffen Jung as Carlo
- Betty Kaplan as Bartender Chazz
- Dong Hyun Yoon as Gorman
- Matthias Schmidt as Kobel
- Moritz Berg as Bartender Berlin
- Angus McGruther as Amadi
- Dominic Holmes as Meyer
- Jonathan Failla as Driver - Berlin Airport
- Stacy Thunes as female Airline Employee
- Cornell Adams as Doorman
- Steven Stalder as Sovereign Driver
- Erkan Sulcani as Bouncer

== Production ==
In July 2020, it was announced that StudioCanal and The Picture Company had acquired Role Play, a thriller spec script written by Seth Owen, based on an original idea by George Heller, to be produced by Alex Heineman and Andrew Rona. In July 2021, it was announced that Kaley Cuoco was in negotiations to star in the film, as well as produce alongside Heineman and Rona. In October 2021, it was reported that Thomas Vincent would direct the film, and Cuoco's roles as actor and producer were also confirmed; Cuoco would be producing though under her banner Yes, Norman Productions.

In June 2022, it was announced that David Oyelowo was cast as Cuoco's character's husband, and Billy Bob Thornton was cast as a "mysterious stranger who encounters the couple". In July 2022, it was announced that Bill Nighy had replaced Thornton, who had to leave the film due to a scheduling conflict. Connie Nielsen was also cast.

Principal photography began in July 2022 at Babelsberg Studio in Berlin, Germany.

== Release ==
In June 2022, it was reported that Amazon Prime Video was in final negotiations to release the film in the United States and several international territories. The sale was confirmed that same month.

Role Play was released by the platform on January 12, 2024.

== Reception ==
On the review aggregator website Rotten Tomatoes, 24% of 49 critics' reviews are positive, with an average rating of 5/10. Metacritic, which uses a weighted average, assigned the film a score of 38 out of 100, based on 11 critics, indicating "generally unfavorable" reviews.

Dennis Harvey of Variety wrote: "Luckily, Role Play is handled lightly enough by Vincent's direction and Seth Owen's script that we never feel the need to take it very seriously. Which is fortunate, because otherwise we'd have to ponder why we’re rooting for an amorally ruthless hitwoman anyway".
