= The Flight Attendant (novel) =

2018 novel by Chris Bohjalian

- First edition cover
- Author: Chris Bohjalian
- Language: English
- Genre: Mystery; thriller
- Publisher: Doubleday
- Publication date: March 13, 2018
- Publication place: United States
- Media type: Print (hardcover and paperback); Audiobook; E-book
- Pages: 368 (hardcover); 512 (paperback)
- ISBN: 978-0-3855-4241-8
- OCLC: 1029546931

The Flight Attendant is a novel by Chris Bohjalian, published on March 13, 2018, by Doubleday. It was adapted into a television series that premiered on HBO Max in 2020.

== Plot summary ==
Flight attendant Cassandra Bowden wakes up with a hangover in a hotel room in Dubai to find a dead body next to her. Afraid to call the police, she continues as though nothing has happened, joining the other flight attendants and pilots traveling to the airport for a flight to New York City. She is met in New York by FBI agents who question her about her recent layover in Dubai. Still unable to piece the night together, she starts to wonder whether she could be the killer.

== Reception ==
Writing for The Washington Post, Maureen Corrigan described the novel as "the ultimate airplane book, and not just because of its name: entertaining and filled with inside info on the less glamorous aspect of flight crew's lives, it may even make you more politely attentive the next time you're asked to listen to that in-flight lecture on emergency water landings."

== Television adaptation ==
In October 2017, it was announced that Kaley Cuoco's production company, Yes, Norman Productions, had optioned the rights to the book to be developed into a limited television series with the same name, The Flight Attendant, starring Cuoco, who was also an executive producer.

The series premiered on November 26, 2020, on HBO Max.
