= Chris Bohjalian =

American novelist

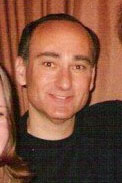
- Born: August 12, 1962 (age 64); White Plains, New York, U.S.
- Education: Amherst College
- Occupation: Novelist
- Spouse: Victoria Schaefer Blewer
- Writing career
- Genre: Fiction
- Notable awards: Oprah Winfrey Book Club selection, 1998, for Midwives

Chris A. Bohjalian (Armenian: Քրիս Պոհճալեան) is an American novelist and the author of over twenty novels, including Midwives (1997), The Sandcastle Girls (2012), The Guest Room (2016), and The Flight Attendant (2018). Bohjalian's work has been published in over thirty languages, and three of his novels have been adapted into films. Bohjalian's The Flight Attendant has been adapted by Steve Yockey for a television drama starring Kaley Cuoco.

== Biography ==
Chris Bohjalian graduated from Amherst College summa cum laude, where he was a member of the Phi Beta Kappa honor society. In the mid-1980s, he worked as an account representative for J. Walter Thompson, an ad agency located in New York City. Bohjalian moved with his wife Victoria Blewer to Lincoln, Vermont in 1988.

In Lincoln, Bohjalian began writing weekly columns for the local newspaper and magazine about living in the small town, which had a population of about 975 residents. The column ran in The Burlington Free Press from 1992 through 2015 and won a Best Lifestyle Column from the Vermont Press Association. Bohjalian has written for Cosmopolitan, Reader's Digest, The New York Times, and the Boston Globe Sunday Magazine.

Bohjalian's first novel, A Killing in the Real World, was released in 1988. His third novel, Past the Bleachers, was released in 1992 and was adapted to a television movie in 1995.

In 1997, Bohjalian's fifth novel, Midwives, was released. The novel focuses on the rural Vermont midwife Sibyl Danforth, who becomes embroiled in a legal battle after one of her patients dies following an emergency Caesarean section. The novel was critically acclaimed and was selected by Oprah Winfrey as the October 1998 selection of Oprah's Book Club. It became a #1 bestseller on the New York Times and USA Today. In 2001, the novel was adapted into a television film starring Sissy Spacek in the lead role. Spacek said the Danforth character appealed to her because "the heart of the story is my character's inner struggle with self-doubt, the solo road you travel when you have a secret".

== Later career ==
Bohjalian followed Midwives with the 1998 novel The Law of Similars, about a widower attorney suffering from nameless anxieties who starts dating a woman who practices alternative medicine. The novel was inspired by Bohjalian's visit to a homeopath in an attempt to cure frequent colds he was catching from his daughter's day care center. Bohjalian said of the visit: "I don't think I imagined there was a novel in homeopathy, however, until I met the homeopath and she explained to me the protocols of healing. There was a poetry to the language that a patient doesn't hear when visiting a conventional doctor." The protagonist, a father, is based in part on Bohjalian himself, and his four-year-old daughter is based largely on Bohjalian's daughter, who was three when he was writing the book. Liz Rosenberg of The New York Times wrote "Few writers can manipulate a plot with Bohjalian's grace and power." However, Rosenberg felt that the novel shared too many similarities with Midwives. Rosenberg argued that, "unlike its predecessor, it (The Law of Similars) fails to take advantage of Bohjalian's great gift for creating thoughtful fiction featuring characters in whom the reader sustains a lively interest." Megan Harlan of The Boston Phoenix described the novel as "formulaic fiction" and wrote that Bohjalian focused too much on creating a complex plot and not enough of complex characterizations. The Law of Similars, like Midwives, made The New York Times bestsellers list.

In 2001, Bohjalian was a finalist for the Lambda Literary Award for Transgender Literature with his book, Trans-Sister Radio. Bohjalian won the New England Book Award in 2002.

The Double Bind was a Barnes & Noble Recommends Selection in 2007 and debuted at #3 on the "New York Times" bestseller list.

In 2008, Bohjalian released Skeletons at the Feast, a love story set in the last six months of World War II in Poland and Germany. The novel was inspired by an unpublished diary written by German citizen Eva Henatsch from 1920 to 1945. The diary was given to Bohjalian in 1998 by Henatsch's grandson Gerd Krahn, a friend of Bohjalian, who had a daughter in the same kindergarten class as Bohjalian's daughter. Bohjalian was fascinated by Henatsch's account of her family's trek west ahead of the Soviet Army, but he was not inspired to write a novel from it until 2006 when he read Armageddon: The Battle for Germany, Max Hastings' history of the final years of World War II. Bohjalian was struck by how often Henatsch's story mirrored real-life experiences and the common "moments of idiosyncratic human connection" found in both. Skeletons at the Feast was considered a departure for Bohjalian because it was set outside of Vermont and set in a particular historical moment. The novel was an enormous commercial and critical success: It was Bohjalian's fifth New York Times bestseller and was selected a "Best Book of the Year" by the Washington Post and the St. Louis Post-Dispatch. It was also an NBC Today Show "Top Ten" summer pick in 2008.

His 2009 novel Secrets of Eden was also a critical success, receiving starred reviews from three of the four trade journals (Booklist, Library Journal, and Publishers Weekly). It debuted at #6 on the bestseller lists for the New York Times and Publishers Weekly. It premiered as a TV movie on February 4, 2012, starring John Stamos, Dorsa Giyahi and Anna Gunn.

His thirteenth novel, The Night Strangers, was published in 2011. It's a ghost story that drew comparisons to the work of Nathaniel Hawthorne, Margaret Atwood, Alice Sebold, Stephen King, and Ira Levin. The reader response was mixed, with some readers frustrated with the ending and Bohjalian's use of the second person for parts of the narration. The book won the New England Society Book Award for fiction in April 2012.

Bohjalian's The Sandcastle Girls (2012) is about the Armenian genocide and its century-long denial by Turkey. The novel includes two stories folded into one: the story of Elizabeth Endicott and Armen Petrosian, lovers who meet in Syria during the genocide; and the story of Laura Petrosian, their granddaughter, who after a century tries to understand why they were silent about their youth. USA Today proclaimed that Bohjalian makes "a near-century-old event come to life in a way that will make readers gasp with shock that such a terrible event — Turkey's determination to kill all the Armenians in their country — is such a small part of our knowledge of world history". Oprah Winfrey chose it as a Book of the Week: "This rendering of one of history's greatest (and least known) tragedies is a nuanced, sophisticated portrayal of what it means not only to endure but also to insist on hope".

Since then Bohjalian has written other New York Times bestsellers, including The Light in the Ruins (2013); Close Your Eyes, Hold Hands (2014); The Guest Room (2016); The Sleepwalker (2017); and The Flight Attendant (2018).

In 2020 the TV show The Flight Attendant, based on Bohjalian's book of the same name, premiered. It is a comedy thriller starring Kaley Cuoco as an alcoholic flight attendant.

Bohjalian's books have been chosen as Best Books of the Year by the Washington Post, the St. Louis Post-Dispatch, Hartford Courant, Milwaukee Journal-Sentinel, Publishers Weekly, Library Journal, Kirkus Reviews, Bookpage, and Salon.

On September 1, 2017, Bohjalian delivered a Vardanants Day Armenian Lecture at the Library of Congress.

== Writing style ==
Bohjalian novels often focus on a specific issue, such as homelessness, animal rights, or environmentalism as well as tend to be character driven, revolving around complex and flawed protagonists and secondary characters. Bohjalian uses characteristics from his life in his writings; in particular, many of his novels take place in Vermont towns, some fictional. Bohjalian has said "writers can talk with agonizing hubris about finding their voices, but for me, it was in Vermont that I discovered issues, things that matter to me." His novels also tend to focus on ordinary people facing extraordinarily difficult situations resulting from unforeseen circumstances, often triggered by other parties.

== Personal life ==
Chris Bohjalian was born to an Armenian father and Swedish mother. His Armenian grandparents were survivors of the Armenian genocide. On October 13, 1984, Bohjalian married Victoria Schaeffer Blewer during a ceremony at the Brick Presbyterian Church in New York City. Chris and Victoria live in Vermont. Their daughter Grace Experience is an actress based in Manhattan.

== Published works ==
- A Killing in the Real World (1988)
- Hangman (1991)
- Past the Bleachers (1992)
- Water Witches (1995)
- Midwives (1997)
- The Law of Similars (1999)
- Trans-Sister Radio (2000)
- The Buffalo Soldier (2002)
- Idyll Banter: Weekly Excursions to a Very Small Town (2003)
- Before You Know Kindness (2004)
- The Double Bind (2007)
- Skeletons at the Feast (2008)
- Secrets of Eden (2010)
- The Night Strangers (2011)
- The Sandcastle Girls (2012)
- The Light in the Ruins (2013)
- Close Your Eyes, Hold Hands (2014)
- The Guest Room (2016)
- The Sleepwalker (2017)
- The Flight Attendant (2018)
- The Red Lotus (2020)
- Hour of the Witch (2021)
- The Lioness (2022)
- The Princess of Las Vegas (2024)
- The Jackal's Mistress (2025)
- The Amateur (2026)
