= Paul Wesley filmography =

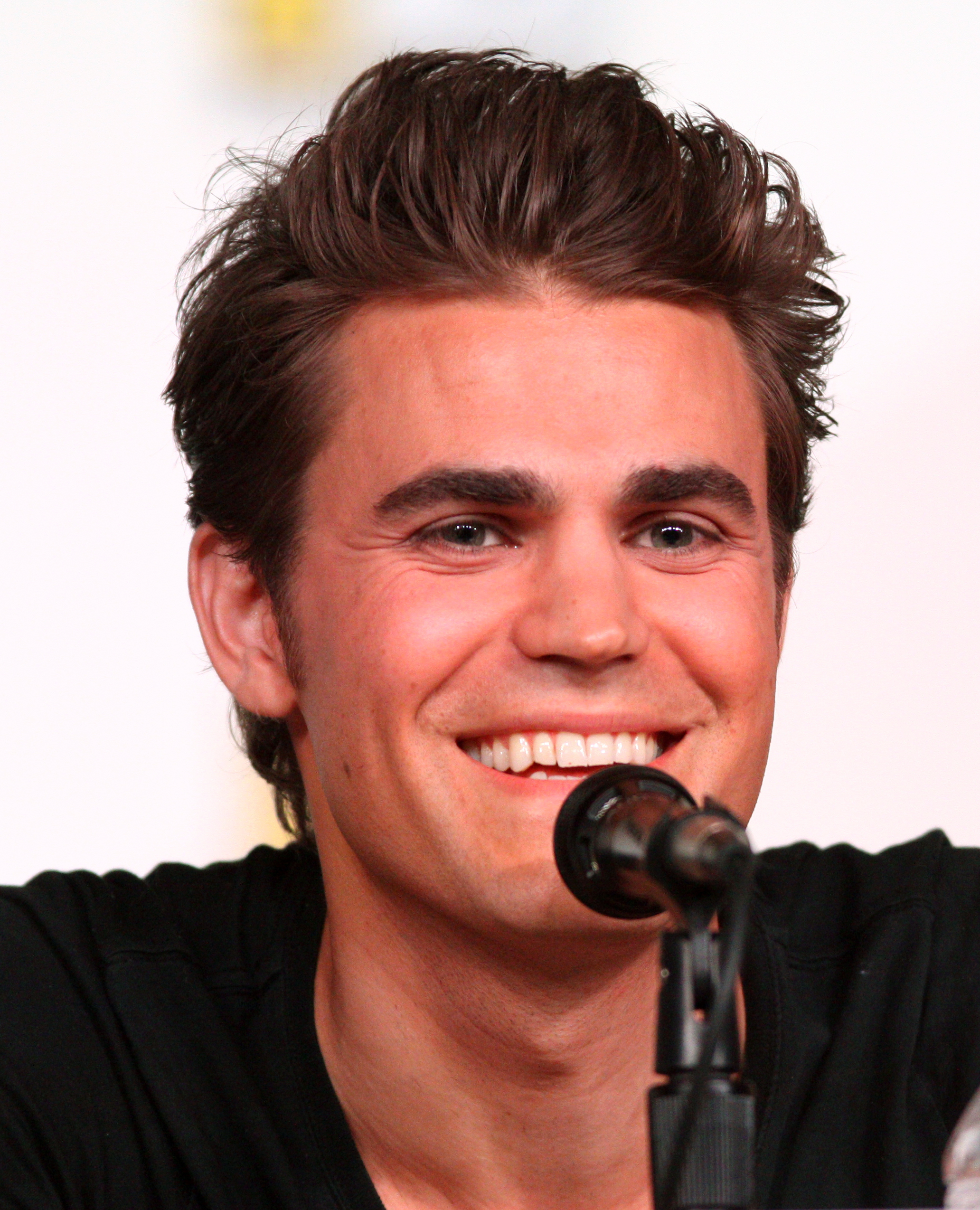
- Paul Wesley at the 2012 San Diego Comic-Con
- Film: 14
- Television film: 5
- Television series: 25

The filmography of American actor Paul Wesley comprises both film and television roles. He has appeared in over fourteen feature films, and twenty-seven television films and series.

== Films ==
List of acting performances in film
| Year | Title | Role | Notes | Ref. |
|---|---|---|---|---|
| 2002 | Minority Report | Nathan with Bicycle | Uncredited | |
| 2004 | The Last Run | Seth | as Paul Wasilewski | |
| 2005 | Roll Bounce | Troy | | |
| 2006 | Cloud 9 | Jackson Fargo | | |
| 2006 | Lenexa, 1 Mile | Rick Lausier | | |
| 2006 | Peaceful Warrior | Trevor | | |
| 2008 | Killer Movie | Jake Tanner | | |
| 2009 | Elsewhere | Billy | | |
| 2010 | Beneath the Blue | Craig Morrison | | |
| 2012 | The Baytown Outlaws | Anthony Reese | | |
| 2014 | Amira & Sam | Charlie | | |
| 2014 | Before I Disappear | Gideon | | |
| 2016 | The Late Bloomer | Charlie | | |
| 2016 | Mothers and Daughters | Kevin | | |
| 2021 | Killer Movie: Director's Cut | Jake Tanner | | |
| 2024 | History of Evil | Ron Dyer | Also executive producer | |
| 2026 | He Bled Neon | | Post-production | |

List of producer credits
| Year | Title | Contributor | Notes | Ref. |
|---|---|---|---|---|
| 2010 | Norman | Producer | | |
| 2014 | Before I Disappear | Producer | | |
| 2019 | Anna | Producer | Short Film | |
| 2021 | Aliya | Producer | Short Film | |
| 2024 | History of Evil | Producer | | |

== Television ==
List of acting performances in television
| Year | Title | Role | Notes | Ref. |
|---|---|---|---|---|
| 1999 | Another World | Sean McKinnon | as Paul Wasilewski | |
| 1999–2001 | Guiding Light | Max Nickerson No. 2 | as Paul Wasilewski | |
| 2000, 2005 | Law & Order: Special Victims Unit | Danny Burrell | Episode: "Wrong is Right" (as Paul Wasilewski) | |
| 2000, 2005 | Law & Order: Special Victims Unit | Luke Breslin | Episode: "Ripped" | |
| 2001 | Shot in the Heart | Gary (Age 15–22) | Television film; as Paul Wasilewski | |
| 2001–2002 | Wolf Lake | Luke Cates | Main role; as Paul Wasilewski | |
| 2002 | The Education of Max Bickford | Craig | Episode: "One More Time"; as Paul Wasilewski | |
| 2002 | Law & Order: Criminal Intent | Luke Miller | Episode: "Malignant"; as Paul Wasilewski | |
| 2002 | Young Arthur | Lancelot | Television film; as Paul Wasilewski | |
| 2002–2005 | American Dreams | Tommy DeFelice | Recurring role (credited as Paul Wasilewski through 2003) | |
| 2003 | The Edge | Himself | Television film; as Paul Wasilewski | |
| 2003 | The O.C. | Donnie | Episode: "The Outsider"; as Paul Wasilewski | |
| 2003 | Smallville | Lucas Luthor | Episode: "Prodigal"; as Paul Wasilewski | |
| 2003–2004 | 8 Simple Rules | Damian | Episodes: "Premiere", "Opposites Attract: Part 3: Night of the Locust"; as Paul Wasilewski | |
| 2003–2004 | Everwood | Tommy Callahan | Recurring role; as Paul Wasilewski | |
| 2004 | CSI: Miami | Jack Warner Bradford | Episode: "Legal" | |
| 2005 | CSI: NY | Steve Samprass | Episode: "Grand Murder at Central Station" | |
| 2006 | Crossing Jordan | Quentin Baker | Episode: "Thin Ice" | |
| 2006 | Fallen | Aaron Corbett | Television film | |
| 2007 | Cane | Nick | 3 episodes | |
| 2007 | Fallen | Aaron Corbett | Television miniseries | |
| 2007 | Shark | Justin Bishop | Episode: "Shaun of the Dead" | |
| 2008 | Cold Case | Petey Murphy (2008) | Episode: "Bad Reputation" | |
| 2008 | The Russell Girl | Evan Carroll | Television film | |
| 2008–2009 | Army Wives | Logan Atwater | Recurring role | |
| 2009–2010 | 24 | Stephen | 4 episodes | |
| 2009–2017 | The Vampire Diaries | Stefan Salvatore / Silas / Tom Avery / Ambrose | Main role; producer (season 8) | |
| 2016 | The Originals | Stefan Salvatore | Episode: "A Streetcar Named Desire" | |
| 2018 | Medal of Honor | Clint Romesha | Episode: "Clint Romesha" | |
| 2018 | Robot Chicken | Piccolo / Soldier / Kurt von Trapp | Voice; Episode: "Shall I Visit the Dinosaurs?" | |
| 2018–2020 | Tell Me a Story | Eddie Longo (season 1); Tucker Reed (season 2) | Main role | |
| 2022 | Flowers in the Attic: The Origin | John Amos | Miniseries | |
| 2022–present | Star Trek: Strange New Worlds | James T. Kirk | Recurring role | |
| TBA | Icebreaker | Neil Faulkner | | |

List of director credits
| Year | Title | Notes | Ref. |
|---|---|---|---|
| 2014–2016 | The Vampire Diaries | 5 episodes: "Resident Evil", "Woke Up With a Monster", "Detoured on Some Random Backwoods Path to Hell", "Requiem for a Dream", "Things We Lost In The Fire" | |
| 2017 | Shadowhunters | Episode: "Day of Atonement" | |
| 2019 | Legacies | Episode: "The Boy Who Still Has a Lot of Good to Do" | |
| 2019 | Roswell, New Mexico | Episode: "I Saw the Sign" | |
| 2020 | Batwoman | Episode: "A Narrow Escape" | |

=== Web ===
| Year | Title | Role | Notes |
|---|---|---|---|
| 2009 | The Vampire Diaries: A Darker Truth | Stefan Salvatore | Episode: "A Darker Truth Part 3"; archive footage |

== Audio ==
| Year | Title | Role | Notes |
|---|---|---|---|
| 2026 | The Haunting of Pendle Creek | Ezra | Main role |
