= Adele Parks =

English author

Adele Parks MBE
- Parks at the 2026 London Book Fair
- Born: Teesside, England
- Education: University of Leicester
- Occupation: Author
- Website: www.adeleparks.com

Adele Parks MBE (born 1969 or 1970) is an English women's fiction author. She has written 24 novels in her 24-year career as an author and is one of the bestselling authors of women's fiction in the United Kingdom.

== Biography ==
Parks is from Teesside, near Middlesbrough, in North Yorkshire. She decided she wanted to be a writer at the age of seven. She studied English at the University of Leicester. Before becoming a novelist, Parks worked in advertising and management consultancy. Her debut novel, Playing Away, was released in 2000.

As of January 2025, she has sold more than 5.5 million UK edition copies of her novels and her books have been translated into 31 languages. Every one of her 23 novels are bestsellers in the UK.

She was awarded with an MBE in the New Year Honours List 2022. She was a judge of the Costa Book Awards in 2010 and has regularly been the judge of the Costa Short Story Awards. In 2009 she was awarded an honorary doctorate, a Doctor of Letters, by Teesside University. Her Quick Read book, Happy Families, won the Learners' Favourite Award. She is an ambassador for literacy charity The Reading Agency and a Patron of the National Literacy Trust. She is also a Patron of The Guildford Book Festival.

Lies, Lies, Lies was shortlisted for the 2020 Fiction Book of the Year in the British Book Awards.

== Personal life ==
Parks has been married twice, divorcing her first husband aged 32. She has an adult son, Conrad.

She is a Pescaterian. She lives in Surrey with her husband.

== Adaptations ==
In 2020, Parks entered a deal with MPCA and Engage Productions for cinematic adaptations of her books.

Parks' 2017 novel The Image of You was adapted into a 2024 feature film of the same title, directed by Jeff Fisher from a screenplay by Chris Sivertson and starring Sasha Pieterse.

In 2026, James Strong's Studiocanal-backed company optioned the rights to adapt Our Beautiful Mess and its shared universe for television.

== Works ==
- Playing Away (2000)
- Game Over (2001)
- Larger Than Life (2002)
- The Other Woman's Shoes (2003)
- Still Thinking of You (2004)
- Husbands (2005)
- Young Wives' Tales (2007)
- Happy Families (2008)
- Tell Me Something (2008)
- Love Lies (2009)
- Men I've Loved Before (2010)
- About Last Night (2011)
- Whatever It Takes (2012)
- The State We're In (2013)
- Spare Brides (2014)
- If You Go Away (2015)
- Love Is a Journey (2016)
- The Stranger in My Home (2016)
- The Image of You (2017)
- I Invited Her In (2018)
- Lies Lies Lies (2019)
- Just My Luck (2020)
- Both of You (2021)
- One Last Secret (2022)
- Just Between Us (2023)
- First Wife's Shadow (2024)
- Our Beautiful Mess (2025)
