= Jeff Fisher (director) =

American film and television director, producer, and writer

- Born: Jeffrey Lawrence Fisher; January 19, 1968 (age 58); Hollywood, Florida, U.S.
- Occupations: Film and television director, producer, writer
- Years active: 1990s–present
- Notable work: Killer Movie, My Christmas Love, The Image of You
- Parents: Harry Fisher (father); Gilda T. Fisher (mother)
- Website: www.jefffisherdirector.com

Jeff Fisher (born January 19, 1968) is an American film and television director, producer, and writer. Fisher made his feature directorial debut with the film Killer Movie and has directed television films such as My Christmas Love (2016) and genre films in development or released in the 2020s.

== Early life and education ==
Jeff Fisher was born on January 19, 1968, in Hollywood, Florida, United States. He began making short films in middle school and later earned a degree in film from Columbia College Chicago, where his student films won consecutive awards in film technique competitions.

== Career ==
Fisher began his entertainment career working in reality television and production roles. Early credits include reality and unscripted shows such as The Simple Life, The Real World, Keeping Up with the Kardashians, MTV’s The Challenge, Dancelife, and 90 Day Fiancé.

Fisher directed and wrote his first feature film, the horror comedy Killer Movie (2008), which premiered at the Tribeca Film Festival and starred Paul Wesley, Kaley Cuoco, and Leighton Meester.

He later directed the television movie My Christmas Love (2016), a romantic holiday film released on the Hallmark Channel.

In the 2020s, Fisher has directed films including The Image of You (2024), a thriller project, and The Stranger in My Home.

== Filmography ==
=== Feature films ===
- Killer Movie (2008) – Director
- Christmas Camp (2018)
- The Image of You (2024) – Director
- The Stranger in My Home (2025) – Director

=== Television films ===
- My Christmas Love (2016) – Director
- Christmas Camp (2018) – Director

=== Television (selected) ===
- The Simple Life
- The Real World
- Keeping Up with the Kardashians
- MTV’s The Challenge
- Dancelife
- 90 Day Fiancé.
