= The Image of You (film) =

2024 film by Jeff Fisher

- Theatrical release poster
- Directed by: Jeff Fisher
- Screenplay by: Chris Sivertson
- Based on: The Image of You by Adele Parks
- Produced by: Brad Krevoy
- Starring: Sasha Pieterse; Parker Young; Mira Sorvino; Nestor Carbonell
- Cinematography: Graham Robbins
- Edited by: Jason Dale
- Music by: Hamish Thomson
- Production company: Motion Picture Corporation of America
- Distributed by: Republic Pictures; Paramount Global Content Distribution
- Release date: May 10, 2024
- Running time: 94 minutes
- Country: United States
- Language: English

The Image of You is a 2024 American psychological thriller film directed by Jeff Fisher from a screenplay written by Chris Sivertson and based on the 2017 novel of the same name by Adele Parks, and starring Sasha Pieterse and Parker Young. Its plot follows the story of identical twin sisters, who find their bond tested when one of them falls in love with a man, and the other sister sets out to discover the truth about him, where things will prove fatal.

The Image of You was released theatrically and on digital in the United States on May 10, 2024.

== Premise ==
Anna and Zoe are identical twins, who share a bond so close that nothing – and no one – can tear them apart. But the two have very different personalities; while Anna is romantic and trusting, Zoe is daring and dangerous. When Anna meets charismatic Nick, an ambitious stock trader, she thinks he's perfect. But Zoe, who has seen Anna betrayed by men before, doesn't trust him. She's determined to find who Nick really is and discover the truth about him, no matter who stands in the way. As Zoe digs for the truth, they're all pulled into a dangerous game where honesty could prove fatal.

== Cast ==
- Sasha Pieterse as Anna and Zoe
- Parker Young as Nick
- Néstor Carbonell as David
- Mira Sorvino as Alexia
- Michele Nordin as Rebecca
- Ben Milliken as Hal
- Rebekah Graf as Isabelle
- Anne Sward as Pamela
- Mark Provencher as Ivan
- Kate Rachesky as Kayla
- Ogy Durham as Vera
- Teo Santos as Pete

== Production ==
In July 2023, Deadline announced that Republic Pictures has snapped up rights to The Image of You - an adaptation of the same-name novel from UK-based bestseller Adele Parks, which Jeff Fisher directs from a script by Chris Sivertson. Motion Picture Corporation of America's CEO Brad Krevoy with David Wulf and Ernie Barbarash were confirmed as main producers, along with Amanda Phillips, Lorenzo Nardini, Aj Risch and Kaan Karahan also serve as exec producers. Sasha Pieterse was cast in starring dual roles of Anna and Zoe, along with Parker Young in the role of Nick. Néstor Carbonell and Academy Award winner Mira Sorvino were also added to the cast list, in the role of the twins' wealthy parents, Alexia and David, with Michele Nordin as Nick's sister, Rebecca.

== Release ==
The Image of You was theatrically released in the United States on May 10, 2024. From the day of the premiere, the film was also available via PVOD, followed by digital platforms Amazon Prime Video and Apple TV. It had a limited theatrical run and was released in select theaters.

== Reception ==
On the review aggregator website Rotten Tomatoes, 63% of 8 critics' reviews are positive, with an average rating of 4.8/10.

Will Sayre from MovieWeb gave the film two-and-a-half out of five stars, opining that "The storyline digresses significantly from the hit novel by Parks by the end, but other elements are also responsible for hiccups along the way, such as cheesy stylistic choices on the filmmaking front that almost make this feature film feel like an elongated network TV episode."

Kyle Climas of FilmSpeak gave the film an average grade of 'C,' writing that "The Image of You is one of those inexplicable films which becomes more tolerable – or at least, more entertaining – as it becomes more absurd. The actors' performances, while stilted and clunky at first, improve over time as they embrace the hyperbole."

Leslie Felperin from The Guardian gave the film two out of five stars, stating "There's a bit of soft-core humping and salty talk to break up the tedium, a phenomenon that's fast disappearing from most mainstream films. The ripe naffness on show makes it somehow entertaining."
