= I Can't Fix You =

Single by Sasha Pieterse

from the album TBA
- Released: July 12, 2013
- Recorded: 2013
- Genre: Country, Country pop
- Length: 3:47
- Label: Dan Franklin Music
- Songwriter(s): Sasha Pieterse; Dan Franklin
- Producer(s): Dan Franklin

Sasha Pieterse singles chronology
"R.P.M." (2013)	"I Can't Fix You" (2013)	"No" (2013)

"I Can’t Fix You" (stylized in all lowercase) is a song by South African-American singer Sasha Pieterse. The single was released on July 12, 2013, accompanied by a music video was released three days earlier.

== Background ==
“I Can’t Fix You”, was written for one of Pieterse' friends who is struggling with addiction. “I wanted to save this person. I wanted to fix them. And, I couldn’t, ” she says upon revealing the tear-inducing inspiration behind the song. “And it kind of came down to me realizing that, because I couldn’t do that, all I could do was love them and support them, and try to keep them accountable.”

She has teamed up with "A Light of Hope", a substance abuse support center in Southern California, to promote the song and its powerful message. Ten percent of the single's sales will go to benefiting the non-profit's life-saving services. “I’m excited to be partnering up with A Light of Hope,” said Pieterse. “They’re in my local community and they’re doing such great work.”

== Music video ==
The music video released on July 9, 2013. The video was directed by Dan Franklin and Johnny Kubelka. The video featured the foundation "A Light of Hope" which deals with people whom have struggled with substance abuse.

== Live Performances ==
Pieterse performed "I Can't Fix You" live on Feb 3, 2014 with duo Dan and Leland.

== Chart Positions ==
The song debuted on iTunes in Brazil, France and United Kingdom at 1, 4 and at 16, respectively.

== Track listing ==
- Digital download
1. "I Can't Fix You" – 3:29
