= The Honor List =

2018 film by Elissa Down

- Release poster
- Directed by: Elissa Down
- Written by: Marilyn Fu
- Produced by: Liz Destro
- Starring: Meghan Rienks; Karrueche Tran; Arden Cho; Sasha Pieterse
- Cinematography: Catherine Goldschmidt
- Edited by: Peggy Eghbalian
- Music by: Michael Yezerski
- Production companies: Studio L; Cinestar Pictures; Untitled Entertainment; Destro Films
- Distributed by: Lionsgate
- Release date: May 11, 2018
- Running time: 103 minutes
- Country: United States
- Language: English

The Honor List is a 2018 American coming-of-age drama film directed by Elissa Down and starring Meghan Rienks, Karrueche Tran, Arden Cho, and Sasha Pieterse.

== Premise ==
Four friends revisit a bucket list they left at the bottom of a lake after they lose one of their pack to an illness.

== Cast ==
- Meghan Rienks as Piper Morely
- Sasha Pieterse as Isabella Walker
- Karrueche Tran as Sophie Stevens
- Arden Cho as Honor Liang
- Chris Mason as Aaron Masey
- Ethan Peck as Dillon Walker

== Release ==
The film was released on demand and on digital on May 11, 2018, and on DVD on May 15, 2018, by Lionsgate.

== Reception ==
Andrea Beach of Common Sense Media awarded the film three stars out of five.
