= The Help (TV series) =

- Genre: Situation comedy
- Created by: Ron Leavitt
- Starring: Camille Guaty; Al Santos; Brenda Strong; Keri Lynn Pratt; Megan Fox; Mindy Cohn; Marika Dominczyk; Antonio Sabato Jr.
- Opening theme: "Jump in the Line" by Harry Belafonte
- Country of origin: United States
- Original language: English
- No. of seasons: 1
- No. of episodes: 7

Production
- Executive producers: Ron Leavitt; Marty Adelstein
- Camera setup: Multi-camera
- Running time: 30 minutes
- Production company: Warner Bros. Television

Original release
- Network: The WB
- Release: March 5 – April 16, 2004

The Help is an American sitcom television series which premiered on The WB on March 5, 2004. The show was a raunchy comedy that focused on the hard-luck life of a beauty school dropout who must work for the wealthy, spoiled Ridgeway family along with the rest of the staff. The WB only aired seven episodes, the show ending on April 16, 2004, and canceled it in May 2004.

It was the last television series created by Ron Leavitt before his death from lung cancer in 2008.

== Summary ==
Maria is studying to be a beautician when she has to come home to nurse her sick mother. After her mother's death, Maria is forced to take her place as the wealthy Ridgeway family's maid. She soon discovers not only a class struggle between the Ridgeways and the help, but also an all-out war among the servants.

== Cast ==
=== Main ===
- Camille Guaty as Maria, the maid
- Al Santos as Ollie, the chauffeur
- Brenda Strong as Arlene Ridgeway, the rich lady
- Keri Lynn Pratt as Veronica Ridgeway, the pop-star daughter
- Megan Fox as Cassandra Ridgeway, the spoiled daughter
- Mindy Cohn as Maggie, the cook
- Marika Dominczyk as Anna, the nanny
- Graham Murdoch as Douglas Ridgeway, the "baby"
- Antonio Sabato Jr. as Dwayne, the trainer

=== Recurring ===
- Tori Spelling as Molly, the dog walker
- Esther Scott as Doris, the older nanny
- Jack Axelrod as Grandpa Eddie
- David Faustino as Adam Ridgeway, the oldest son

== Episodes ==
All seven episodes were directed by Gerry Cohen.

No.	Title	Written by	Original release date	U.S. viewers (millions)
1	"Pilot"	Ron Leavitt	March 5, 2004	3.33
Arlene's new personal assistant, Bernice Hipple (Kennedy), announces that if the missing $1000 is not returned by the end of the day, all of the help will be fired.
2	"Dwayne Gets A Cold"	Ron Leavitt	March 12, 2004	2.30
Dwayne misses work because mysophobe Arlene doesn't want a sick trainer near her. The help realize that the new trainer (Roland Kickinger) is a threat to Dwayne's job—and is more repulsive than Dwayne—so Maria starts a campaign to save Dwayne's job.
3	"Maggie Chicken"	Christina Lynch	March 26, 2004	2.47
The help's love of Maggie's "Maggie Chicken" leads to getting the Ridgeways to invest in a start-up venture. All goes well until Maggie refuses to include her secret ingredient in the recipe.
4	"Pahtay"	James L. Freedman & Stacie Lipp	March 26, 2004	2.51
The Ridgeways take an immediate vacation when a rat is found in their mansion. The help take advantage of the freedom and throw a wild party that gets busted by Bernice.
5	"Ollie Shares"	Matt Leavitt	April 2, 2004	2.11
After getting arrested for selling fake IDs, Ollie sells shares of himself to the help in order to pay for his lawyer.
6	"Doghouse"	James L. Freedman & Stacie Lipp	April 9, 2004	1.83
Maria lives in the posh doghouse while her apartment is being renovated.
7	"Searching For Grandpa Eddie"	Marcy Vosburgh	April 16, 2004	2.25
When Arlene announces an "employee of the month" competition, Molly decides to take Grandpa Eddie along when she walks the dog to show her dedication to the Ridgeways. Molly loses Grandpa Eddie at the park. The Help come to the rescue, for Molly's sake as much as for their own job security.

== Reception ==
The premiere of The Help was the most watched program in the Friday 9:30–10:00 time slot on The WB in the 2003–04 season. The premiere was more popular among women than men aged 12–34 (2.0/8 versus 1.3/5).

Despite the premiere being the best performance in the time slot of the season on The WB, critical reception had was negative. Virginia Heffernan of The New York Times said the show "comes off like a school play, clumsily blocked, loudly acted and nearly shouted down by obligatory laughter and applause". Robert Bianco of USA Today pointed out that "this is the kind of show that opens with a doggie-doo joke and still finds a way to go downhill". Matthew Gilbert of The Boston Globe wrote, "The WB's claim that 'The Help' is a 'biting satire' is only half true. No, it's not a satire, but yes, it does indeed bite. And it will be biting the dust before long, unless it can find a new cast, new writers, new producers, a new set, and an entirely new premise." In her review of the 2003–04 TV season, Kay McFadden, television critic for The Seattle Times, classified The Help as "Never should have aired".
