= The Wannabe =

- Theatrical release poster
- Directed by: Nick Sandow
- Written by: Nick Sandow
- Produced by: Michael Gasparro; Lizzie Nastro; Vincent Piazza
- Starring: Vincent Piazza; Patricia Arquette; Michael Imperioli; Doug E. Doug; Vincenzo Amato; David Zayas; Domenick Lombardozzi; Joseph Siravo; Nick Sandow
- Cinematography: Brett Pawlak
- Edited by: Melody London
- Music by: Nathan Larson
- Production companies: Electric Entertainment; Traction Media
- Distributed by: Orion Pictures; Momentum Pictures
- Release dates: April 17, 2015 (Tribeca Film Festival); December 4, 2015 (United States)
- Running time: 90 minutes
- Country: United States
- Language: English
- Box office: $272

The Wannabe is a 2015 American drama film written and directed by Nick Sandow, with Martin Scorsese as an executive producer, and starring Patricia Arquette, David Zayas, Domenick Lombardozzi, Michael Imperioli, Vincent Piazza and Nick Sandow.

This was distributed by Orion Pictures and Momentum Pictures on December 4, 2015.

== Cast ==
- Vincent Piazza as Thomas
- Patricia Arquette as Rose
- Michael Imperioli as Alphonse
- David Zayas as Pablo Guzman
- Domenick Lombardozzi as Mickey
- Nick Sandow as Anthony
- Mike Starr as Jerry
- Doug E. Doug as The Twin
- Vincenzo Amato as Richie
- Slaine as Bruce Cutler
- Larry Eudene as Assistant DA
- Joseph Siravo as John Gotti
- Neal Huff as Judge Glasser
- Mark Lotito as Prosecutor Maloney
- Adriana DeMeo as Annie
- Daniel Sauli as Curtis Sliwa
- Mario Macaluso as Whitey
- Jay Bulger as Eric Roberts
- Mark Vincent as Eddie Lino
- Joe Bevilacqua as Giuseppe

== Production ==
Nick Sandow was inspired to write the film after reading about Thomas and Rosemarie Uva, a New York City couple who were murdered on Christmas Eve 1992 by the New York mafia after they had robbed several mafia social clubs over the prior few months. After Sandow worked with his Boardwalk Empire co-star Vincent Piazza on the script, the pair sent the script to Boardwalk Empire executive producer Martin Scorsese. Sandow told Creative Screenwriting, "When we felt comfortable about the script, we thought about trying to get it to Marty. He sent it to him with a bottle of wine before the holidays. We didn't have expectations, but after the holidays they were having a table read for the first episode of the next season of Boardwalk Empire and Marty came up to him and said he loved The Wannabe." Scorsese agreed to serve as executive producer of the film.

== Release ==
The film premiered at the Tribeca Film Festival on April 17, 2015, and theatrically released on December 4, 2015, in the United States by Orion Pictures and Momentum Pictures.

== Reception ==
On review aggregator Rotten Tomatoes the film holds a "Rotten" 38% rating based on eight reviews, with an average rating of 3.5/10. On Metacritic, the film has a weighted average score of 49 out of 100, based on seven critics, indicating "mixed or average reviews".

Ronnie Scheib of Variety called the film a "conventional mob drama" but praised the performances.
