= RPM (Sasha Pieterse song) =

"R.P.M."

Single by Sasha Pieterse

from the album TBA
- Released: June 13, 2013
- Recorded: 2013
- Genre: Country, Southern rock
- Length: 3:31
- Label: Dan Franklin Music
- Songwriters: Sasha Pieterse; Dan Franklin
- Producer: Dan Franklin

Sasha Pieterse singles chronology
"This Country is Bad Ass" (2013)	"R.P.M." (2013)	"I Can't Fix You" (2013)

"R.P.M." is a song by South African-American singer Sasha Pieterse. The single, accompanied by a music video, was released on June 13, 2013.

== Background and release ==
The music video released on June 13, 2013. The video was directed by Matt Steele.

== Credits and personnel ==
=== Video cast ===
- Vocals and background vocals – Sasha Pieterse
- Boyfriend - Alexander Suarez
- Drums – Matt Davis
- Guitar – Dan Franklin
- Bass – Allee Fütterer
- Fiddle – Lauren Baba
- Songwriting – Pieterse, Matt Steele
- Production – Steele, Dan Franklin

=== Music video ===
- Director – Matt Steele
- Executive Producers – Sasha Pieterse, Dan Franklin, Matt Steele
- Location Sound – Johnny Kubelka
- Grip – Hudson Sheaffer
- Makeup – Kristina Goldberg
- Hair – Jeanie Duronsiet
- Driver – Bill Diaz
- Wardrobe consideration – Threadsence
- Equipment consideration – Carvin, Divided by 13, Orybon Drums, Hollywood Sound

== Chart Positions ==
The song debuted in Brazil, France at 91.

Chart (2013)	Peak position
Brazil (Hot 100 Airplay)	91

== Track listing ==
- Digital download
1. "R.P.M." – 3:31
