= Burning Bodhi =

- Directed by: Matthew McDuffie
- Written by: Matthew McDuffie
- Produced by: Marshall Bear; Marj Ergas
- Starring: Kaley Cuoco; Meghann Fahy; Cody Horn; Landon Liboiron; Sasha Pieterse; Eli Vargas; Andy Buckley; Virginia Madsen
- Cinematography: David J. Myrick
- Edited by: Ben Callahan
- Music by: Ian Hultquist
- Distributed by: monterey media inc. (usa)
- Release date: November 1, 2015 (Austin Film Festival)
- Running time: 93 minutes
- Country: United States
- Language: English

Burning Bodhi is a 2015 independent film written and directed by Matthew McDuffie. It stars Kaley Cuoco, Landon Liboiron, Sasha Pieterse, and Cody Horn. The film had its world premiere at the Austin Film Festival on November 1, 2015.

== Plot ==
Dylan finds out via Facebook that his best friend from high school, "Bodhi" has died suddenly of an aneurysm. Reluctantly, he returns to his old neighborhood in New Mexico to grieve his popular friend's death. Yet, as past lovers and old friends follow suit, Dylan gradually realizes his homecoming also means reconciling the realities of his present with those of the people from his past. The former classmates struggle with the experience of confronting not only Bodhi's sudden passing, but their own vulnerability to blind chance. Throughout their reunion, sticky feelings of love, longing, and regret are stirred up in the characters, alongside novel insights into forgiveness, mortality, and gratitude.

== Cast ==
- Kaley Cuoco as Katy
- Sasha Pieterse as Aria
- Virginia Madsen as Naomi
- Tatanka Means as Lucas
- Cody Horn as Ember
- Landon Liboiron as Dylan
- Andy Buckley as Buck
- Meghann Fahy as Lauren
- Jason A. Sedillo as Big Bob's Friend
- Eli Vargas as Miguel
- Lauren Ham as Ember's Friend
- Augusta Allen-Jones as Rock Chick
- Christopher Atwood as Bodhi's Dad
- Juanita Trad as Katy's Grandmother
- Lara Dale as Katy's Mom
- Wyatt Denny as Big Bob

== Production ==
Principal photography commenced in Albuquerque, New Mexico in July 2014.

== Release ==
The film had its world premiere at the Austin Film Festival on November 1, 2015. Monterey Media bought the U.S. and Canadian rights for the film in November following the Austin Film Festival. The theatrical launch was on March 18, 2016.
