= Enlisted (TV series) =

- Genre: Sitcom
- Created by: Kevin Biegel
- Starring: Geoff Stults; Chris Lowell; Parker Young; Keith David; Angelique Cabral
- Composers: Orr Rebhun; Erica Weis; Evan Brau
- Country of origin: United States
- Original language: English
- No. of seasons: 1
- No. of episodes: 13

Production
- Executive producers: Kevin Biegel; Mike Royce
- Camera setup: Single-camera
- Running time: 24 minutes
- Production companies: Palace Flophouse; Snowpants Productions; 20th Century Fox Television

Original release
- Network: Fox
- Release: January 10 – June 22, 2014

Enlisted is an American sitcom that premiered January 10, 2014, on Fox. Fox placed a 13-episode order for the single-camera comedy in May 2013. Despite low ratings, the show received many good reviews.

On March 26, 2014, Fox announced that from April 11, Kitchen Nightmares would be airing in Enlisted's timeslot – effectively removing Enlisted from the schedule after nine episodes had aired. On May 7, 2014, Fox canceled the series due to low ratings, but allowed the final four episodes to air in June. The entire first season was released on DVD on December 9, 2014.

== Premise ==
Three very different brothers, each soldiers in the U.S. Army, find themselves all assigned to the same unit: the fictional A Company, 2nd Battalion, 618th Infantry Regiment, 1st Brigade Combat Team, 18th Infantry Division (Mechanized), at the fictional Fort McGee, located in Florida. While the majority of the base's personnel are deployed overseas, the two younger brothers (Derrick and Randy) are assigned to rear detachment – the soldiers left behind to take care of the base. The oldest brother, Staff Sergeant Pete Hill, is returned stateside from Afghanistan after punching a superior officer. He is assigned to supervise a platoon of misfits that includes his brothers. While working together, the brothers are able to renew and strengthen their childhood bonds.

== Cast ==
=== Main cast ===
- Geoff Stults as Staff Sergeant Peter "Pete" Hill, the older brother
- Chris Lowell as Corporal Derrick Hill, the middle brother
- Parker Young as Private First Class Randall "Randy" Hill, the younger brother
- Keith David as Command Sergeant Major Donald Cody
- Angelique Cabral as Staff Sergeant Jillian "Jill" Perez

=== Supporting cast ===
- Kyle Davis as Private First Class Dobkiss
- Tania Gunadi as Private First Class Cindy Park
- Mel Rodriguez as Specialist George Chubowski
- Mort Burke as Private First Class Mort Gumble
- Michelle Buteau as Private Tanisha Robinson
- Maronzio Vance as Private Ruiz
- Ross Philips as Second Lieutenant Tyson Schneeberger
- Jessy Hodges as Erin
- Rob Lamer as Sam
- Brandon Routh as Brandon Stone

== Episodes ==
The first season aired mostly out of the production order in an effort to build early positive buzz by airing "stronger" episodes first. As a result, some plot points did not play out as intended by the creative team – most noticeably in the fourth episode to air ("Homecoming"), which was the tenth episode produced; there was a jump forward as Derrick was shown to be in a relationship with Erin despite not meeting her until the sixth episode to air, which was the fifth episode produced. This resulted in a "lack of investment in the stakes of said relationship". The football-themed tenth episode had been moved forward to coincide with Super Bowl XLVIII, which took place two days later. According to producer Mike Royce, the following is the correct order.

No.	Title	Directed by	Written by	Original release date	Prod. code	US viewers (millions)
1	"Pilot"	Phil Traill	Kevin Biegel	January 10, 2014	1AWV79	2.41
Staff Sergeant Pete Hill is sent home from Afghanistan for assaulting a superior and is forced to return to the US. Upon his return, he is made the platoon sergeant of a group of misfits at Florida-based Fort McGee that includes his two younger brothers, Derrick and Randy. Pete's sergeant major, Command Sergeant Major Cody, gives his platoon the task of finding a lost dog that belongs to the family of a deployed soldier. Pete's platoon is moments away from winning a war games exercise against a group of Italian troops when the dog is spotted in the battlefield, causing Pete to choose between winning the war games or rescuing the dog.
2	"Parade Duty"	Phil Traill	Mike Royce	March 7, 2014	1AWV03	1.84
The town's annual parade is coming, and Cody asks Jill's troops to march in the parade while placing Pete's team on "doody duty" (clean-up detail). Derrick and the troops seem perfectly happy with this, as it means they only have to work a couple of hours and don't have to do marching practice in the hot sun. But when Pete challenges the gang and asks if they've ever aspired to something greater, they all remember how Derrick was their "dreamcrusher" when they first came to the base, and they turn on him.
3	"Pete's Airstream"	Matt Sohn	Theresa Mulligan Rosenthal	January 24, 2014	1AWV02	3.23
Randy wants Pete to move in with him and Derrick but Pete just wants to get away from everyone at the end of the day, so he buys a trailer away from the barracks. Meanwhile, Robinson and Park challenge Sgt. Perez's desire to be an enigma who keeps her work and private lives separate.
4	"Randy Get Your Gun"	Phil Traill	Jeff Chiang & Eric Ziobrowski	January 17, 2014	1AWV05	2.01
After Pete and Jill tie for the base marksmanship trophy, they embark on a series of additional competitions to try and break the tie. Meanwhile, Randy is the only member of his troop to fail the marksmanship test, so Derrick steps in with some unusual training methods to prepare his brother for a retest.
5	"Rear D Day"	Phil Traill	Kevin Biegel	February 7, 2014	1AWV01	1.83
Pete and his unit offer to do home improvements for an obnoxious father (Andrew Daly) and his reclusive son (Drew Justice) while their wife/mother is deployed. As the projects become more challenging and the father more irritating, Derrick fears Pete's legendary temper will surface, but Pete gets through it by using a technique he learned in Afghanistan called "embracing the suck." All goes well and the projects are finished, but Pete loses it when the father says Pete and his troops are "not real soldiers." In the end, Randy figures out a way for the father to connect with his son. Meanwhile, Jill thinks Cody is taking her out for coffee to talk about her request for enrollment in the Advanced Leader Course, but he just uses her to help spy on his teenage daughter.
6	"Brothers and Sister"	Peter Lauer	Peter A. Knight	February 28, 2014	1AWV04	1.90
An AFO show (similar to USO) comes to the base, and the show's coordinator turns out to be a girlfriend of Pete's that he never contacted again after being deployed, and still hasn't since he returned. Jill convinces Pete to be a man and apologize, but it backfires when the girl thanks Jill for getting them back together again. Derrick realizes his routine of saving Randy from his own embarrassment in front of girls at the bar is unnecessary. He leaves Randy on his own for a night and sees him do fine, while Derrick realizes he has "no game" of his own and spills his guts to bartender Erin. Meanwhile, Cody learns from the troops that his annual song at the AFO show could use some updating.
7	"Prank War"	Phil Traill	Laura Gutin Peterson	June 1, 2014	1AWV07	1.14
When a prank war between Pete and Jill's platoons reveals Pete's hidden weakness, Derrick and Randy must help their brother maintain the respect of the platoon. But Jill appears to have the upper hand in every prank. Meanwhile, desk-bound Cody has his hands full dealing with his new, young superior, 2nd LT Schneeberger, a recent West Point grad. When Cody becomes the victim of Pete's prank that was intended for Jill, he gets a chance to put his old soldier skills to work.
8	"Vets"	Fred Goss	Kate Purdy	March 14, 2014	1AWV06	1.36
The troops are all set for a day at the beach on "soldier appreciation day", when Cody asks the Hill brothers to look after three Korean War veterans who are visiting Fort McGee for the first time in 60 years. After the vets steal a Humvee and the brothers go to retrieve it, they each find a connection with one of the old men. The guys learn that the vets are in town for the funeral of a recently passed comrade, and they help the old men fulfill their Army brother's dying wish. Meanwhile, Derrick learns that Erin has a 6-year old son.
9	"The General Inspection"	Richie Keen	Sanjay Shah	June 8, 2014	1AWV08	1.00
Anticipating a visit by a General who was also his mentor, Cody pushes Pete to whip the Rear D into shape for a base inspection. Cody manipulates Pete into action by suggesting he can earn the first meaningful trophy for the Fort McGee display case and become a hero, while also tricking Jill into thinking she can get a face-to-face meeting with the general and push for a promotion. Meanwhile, Jill gains newfound respect for Randy after she is paired with him to prepare for the inspection. In the end, the base earns the general's "gold star" rating for passing inspection without an infraction, but Lt. Schneeberger takes all the credit.
10	"Homecoming"	Michael McDonald	Scott Rutherford	January 31, 2014	1AWV09	2.79
Cody meets with USMC Sergeant Major Diggins to discuss an upcoming Army-Marine flag football game, and the two make their "usual wager" on the results of the game. In his room, Randy becomes emotional watching military homecoming videos on the Internet. Derrick then mentions that his girlfriend Erin, a single mother whose ex-husband is deployed, is upset because she can't take her son Sam (Rob Lamer) to Walt Disney World for his birthday. Derrick offers to take Sam in her place, but all Sam wants is for his father to come home. Randy indirectly convinces Cody to call in some favors to get Sam's father home after suggesting a homecoming ceremony at the football game. At the game, the Army does terribly, but is able to score one touchdown, winning Cody his bet with Diggins. After the game, Sam's father comes onto the field and embraces both Sam and Erin. Derrick thinks the two will now get back together, but Erin then embraces Derrick even stronger for what he did for Sam. Pete and Derrick show Randy a reunion tape with their father that took place while their mother was still pregnant with Randy.
11	"Paint Cart 5000 vs. The Mondo Spider"	Phil Traill	Peter A. Knight & Theresa Mulligan Rosenthal	March 28, 2014	1AWV10	1.33
Pete tries to get the troops excited about painting duty by suggesting they use his tricked-out golf cart, "Paint Cart 5000". But Pete's contraption is upstaged when his troops are introduced to "Mondo Spider", a robotic attack machine. The troops badly want to be part of the detail testing Mondo Spider, but its access is controlled by Lieutenant Schneeberger, whom Pete has crossed in the past. Meanwhile, Cody insists that Derrick use his photography skills to take a new portrait of him, causing Derrick to miss the Mondo Spider tests.
12	"Army Men"	Linda Mendoza	Laura Gutin Peterson & Kate Purdy	June 15, 2014	1AWV11	1.18
Randy and Pete partake in Sgt. Major Cody's Army Ranger trials, reigniting their intense competition over everything. Things take a turn when Jill joins the trial and both brothers think they're in love with her. Meanwhile, Derrick feels emasculated by Erin's ex, and enlists the platoon to make him seem more capable of manly tasks than he really is.
13	"Alive Day"	Phil Traill	Story by : Sanjay Shah; Teleplay by : Jeff Chiang & Eric Ziobrowski	June 22, 2014	1AWV12	0.90
The Hill brothers celebrate Pete's one year anniversary of almost dying in Afghanistan, otherwise known as his "Alive Day." After hearing the funding has been cut for Fort McGee's annual ball, which was going to honor Sergeant Major Cody's 30 years of service, Pete enlists the platoon to create their own ball to honor him. Lori Loughlin makes a cameo appearance as herself, surprisingly showing up after Chubowski invited her to be his date to the ball via an online video.

== U.S. ratings ==
No.	Episode	Original air date	Timeslot (EST)	Viewers (millions)	Rating/share (Adults 18–49)
1	"Pilot"	January 10, 2014	Friday 9:30 pm	2.41	0.7/2
2	"Randy Get Your Gun"	January 17, 2014	Friday 9:30 pm	2.01	0.6/2
3	"Pete's Airstream"	January 24, 2014	Friday 9:00 pm	3.23	1.0/3
4	"Homecoming"	January 31, 2014	Friday 9:00 pm	2.79	0.8/3
5	"Rear D Day"	February 7, 2014	Friday 9:00 pm	1.83	0.7/2
6	"Brothers and Sister"	February 28, 2014	Friday 9:00 pm	1.90	0.6/2
7	"Parade Duty"	March 7, 2014	Friday 9:00 pm	1.84	0.7/2
8	"Vets"	March 14, 2014	Friday 9:00 pm	1.36	0.5/2
9	"Paint Cart 5000 vs. The Mondo Spider"	March 28, 2014	Friday 9:00 pm	1.33	0.4/1
10	"Prank War"	June 1, 2014	Sunday 7:00 pm	1.14	0.4/2
11	"The General Inspection"	June 8, 2014	Sunday 7:00 pm	1.00	0.4/2
12	"Army Men"	June 15, 2014	Sunday 7:00 pm	1.18	0.4/2
13	"Alive Day"	June 22, 2014	Sunday 7:00 pm	0.90	0.3/1

=== Scheduling and cancellation ===
Fox pulled Enlisted from its schedule after the ninth aired episode on March 28, 2014. The network stated it would air the remaining four episodes at some point, later announcing June 1, 2014 as the restart date. Ratings had been poor, though many fans and television critics cited a poor time slot and episodes airing out of sequence for the show's failure. The program was officially cancelled on May 7, 2014, despite pleas from fans and some TV writers to keep it on the air. The Army Times wrote an editorial asking Fox to give the show another chance in a better time slot. The final four episodes were made available on Hulu.

== Broadcast ==
The series premiered in Australia on Eleven on May 18, 2014.
