= Adriana DeMeo =

American actress

Adriana DeMeo (born 1981) is an American actress. She is known for playing Lucy in the CBS television drama series Without a Trace.

== Early life ==
Adriana DeMeo was born in Brooklyn, New York. Her parents moved to Brooklyn from a small town in Italy. She attended a special two-year performing arts program at Howell High School in New Jersey. DeMeo graduated from Rutgers University.

== Career ==
Her first on-screen appearance was a guest role as Marianna in an episode of the police procedural television drama series Law & Order: Criminal Intent, soon followed by a three-episode appearance in the final season of The Practice. DeMeo's film work includes roles in Killer Movie (2008), The Wannabe (2015) and The Brooklyn Banker (2016). She joined the cast of CBS show Without a Trace, playing Lucy. She also appeared in episodes of Bones; Boston Legal; Veronica Mars; 30 Rock; Castle; The Carrie Diaries; and Blue Bloods.

She is the lead singer of a rock band called Fuckery.

== Filmography ==
Television roles
Year	Title	Role	Notes
2003	Law & Order: Criminal Intent	Marianna	Episode: "A Person of Interest"
2004	The Practice	Suzy Paponi	3 episodes
2005	Out of Practice	Amy	Episode: "We Wanna Hold Your Hand"
2005	Related	Tanya Torcoletti	Episode: "Hello Deli"
2005	Complex	Margot	Television film
2006	Bones	Abigail Zealey	Episode: "The Superhero in the Alley"
2006	Boston Legal	Julie	Episode: "Desperately Seeking Shirley"
2006–2009	Without a Trace	Lucy	32 episodes
2007	Veronica Mars	Darla	Episode: "Show Me the Monkey"
2007	The Wedding Bells	Muffy Stevens	Episode: "The Fantasy"
2008	Black Widow	Finn Driver	Television film
2008	Life on Mars	Dora Birch	Television film
2010	Castle	Bella Lombardo	Episode: "Almost Famous"
2012	30 Rock	Jenessica	Episode: "Mazel Tov, Dummies!"
2013	The Carrie Diaries	Monica Penny	Episode: "Read Before Use"
2015	Show Me a Hero	Lisa	3 episodes
2016	Blue Bloods	Laura Nelson	Episode: "Fresh Start"
2016	Unbreakable Kimmy Schmidt	Sandra	Episode: "Kimmy Walks Into a Bar!"
2017	Time: The Kalief Browder Story	City Attorney	6 episodes
2017	The Marvelous Mrs. Maisel	Trish	Episode: "Because You Left"
2018	Seven Seconds	Teresa	8 episodes
Film roles
Year	Title	Role	Notes
2004	A Beautiful Mind... of a Gladiator	Alice	Short film
2004	Stay	Julie	Short film
2008	Drived.	Chloe	Short film
2008	Killer Movie	Daphne	
2010	A Lure: Teen Fight Club	Cheerleader KC	
2010	Batman of Suburbia	Receptionist	Short film
2015	The Wannabe	Annie	
2016	The Brooklyn Banker	Maria	
2018	Christmas Camp	Shauna	
2020	A New York Christmas Wedding	Gabrielle Vernaci	
