= Killer Movie =

2008 American slasher film

- Theatrical release poster
- Directed by: Jeff Fisher
- Written by: Jeff Fisher
- Produced by: Cornelia Ryan Taylor; Michael Sanchez; Jeff Fisher; Russell Terlecki
- Starring: Paul Wesley; Kaley Cuoco; Jason London; Al Santos; Cyia Batten; Leighton Meester; Torrey DeVitto
- Music by: Todd Haberman
- Release date: April 24, 2008
- Running time: 91 minutes
- Country: United States
- Language: English
- Budget: $2,000,000 (estimated)
- Box office: $14.32 million

Killer Movie is a 2008 American slasher film released in the United States on April 24, 2008. The film premiered during the 2008 Tribeca Film Festival in New York City. It stars Paul Wesley, Kaley Cuoco, Jason London, Torrey DeVitto and Leighton Meester and was written and directed by Jeff Fisher. Killer Movie was produced by Cornelia Ryan Taylor, Michael Sanchez and Jeff Fisher.

== Plot ==
Television director Jake Tanner travels to a small town to film a reality television show about the town's hockey team. However, town local Jaynie is murdered, being decapitated by a piece of wire hung up between two trees, but the murder is ruled as an accident. Jake meets with the show's producers, Lee and Phoebe, who now want to investigate the murder.

At the local high school, Jake meets crew member Keir, who believes Jaynie was murdered and suspects the hockey team's Coach Carhartt. Jake meets the rest of the crew, including Mike, Daphne, Luke, and Greg; he also meets the team captain, Vance and the head cheerleader, Erin. Meanwhile, cheerleading coach Mrs Falls is murdered by a masked killer, who drags her into a circular saw. The crew interviews Vance, who swears he will get vengeance on whoever murdered Jaynie.

Controversial celebrity Blanca Champion (Kaley Cuoco) soon arrives with her assistant Nik (Robert Buckley) to work on the show. The crew travels to meet Jaynie's father, Coach Hansen (Bruce Bohne), who recently was released from prison for the murder of his wife. Hansen becomes angered however, and forces the crew to leave. While back at the school, Connor (Jackson Bond) tells Jake that Jaynie's death was not an accident. That night, the crew goes to a bar, and discovers Mrs. Falls's death, but again the locals pass the death off as an accident before Coach Hansen turns up and warns the crew away from the town. The next day, Lee and Phoebe fall out as Lee is changing the show to center around the deaths of the locals. Nik is sent to Coach Hansen's house to retrieve equipment that was left there previously. On arrival, Nik finds a dead Coach Hansen in a plastic wrap with his throat slashed, before the killer butchers Nik with a pickaxe.

After Erin and Blanca have an argument, Blanca attempts to leave the town but realizes there is no signal for mobile phones in the town. The crew goes to the bar after filming a hockey match, but Luke remains behind to work out. He is attacked by the killer, who chops off his hand with a meat cleaver before finally hacking him to death. Daphne decides to leave the bar, but while on her way home she discovers Greg's car. She stops and investigates, only to find Greg being horribly decapitated. The killer then turns up and kidnaps her.

The next day, the remaining crew discovers their missing co-workers, causing arguments between the survivors. Lee goes down to the boiler room where she finds the killer is filming the murders using the aid of a lipstick camera. Before she can warn the others though, the killer hangs her with a chain. After more filming, Jake, Blanca, and Keir go back to a cabin to find the others. However, they find footage of Daphne being captured. They go back to the school and drop Blanca off so she can contact help on a CB radio, while Jake and Keir go to where Daphne was captured. Meanwhile, Phoebe is in a local shop looking for laxatives, until she is attacked by the killer. She hides until Coach Carhart arrives and the pair flee to the coach's car. As they are about to leave, the killer slits open Carhart's throat while hiding in the back seat, while Phoebe flees to the school. The killer catches up with her though and strangles her to death.

Jake and Keir discover the killer's lair in the forest, but as they are about to leave Jake steps on a bear trap, so Keir leaves for help. Back at the school, Blanca fails to get help from the radio but finds Connor down in the boiler room, who shows Blanca a video the killer has made devoted to her. As the pair are leaving the school, they discover Daphne's dead body. Blanca soon becomes locked in a room, but Connor escapes. Keir arrives, but the killer quickly knocks her out, before finding Blanca. She escapes the room through the vents, but is confronted by the killer who is revealed to be an obsessed Mike, who murdered everyone to be close to her. Keir attempts to save Blanca, but Mike stabs her. Mike then attempts to kill Blanca but Jake shows up and ends up shooting Mike three times in the chest with his shotgun, presumably killing him.

The next morning, the police arrive and put Mike's body in a body bag. Jake finds out Keir survived being stabbed. He tells her that Mike was an escaped mental patient who was obsessed with Blanca from the start. Jake walks up to Mike's body bag and soon finds out that Mike was wearing a bulletproof vest, the film then ends.

== Cast ==
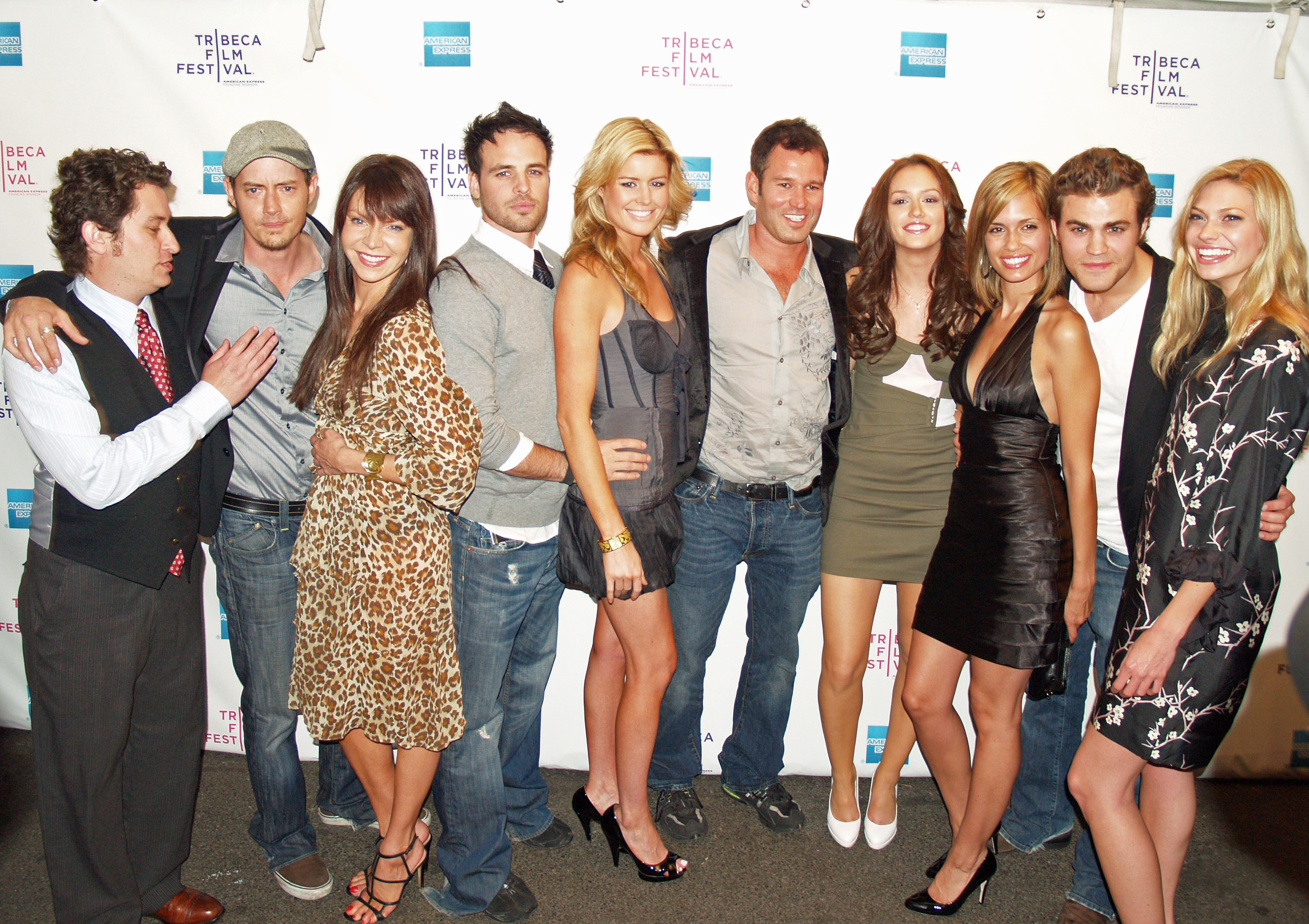
The cast and director attend the movie's premiere at the Tribeca Film Festival.

- Paul Wesley as Jake Tanner
- Kaley Cuoco as Blanca Champion
- Gloria Votsis as Keir
- Jason London as Mike
- Cyia Batten as Lee Tyson
- Al Santos as Luke
- Nestor Carbonell as Seaton Brookstone
- Leighton Meester as Jaynie Hansen
- Adriana DeMeo as Daphne
- Torrey DeVitto as Phoebe Hilldale
- Robert Buckley as Nik
- Andy Fischer-Price as Vance Carhartt
- Jackson Bond as Connor
- Hal B. Klein as Greg
- Maitland McConnell as Erin Gorman
- JC Chasez as Ted Buckley
- Stephen Pelinski as Coach Carhartt
- Jennifer Murphy as Mrs. Falls
- Bruce Bohne as Coach Hansen
- David Quisberg as Hockey player

== Production and background ==
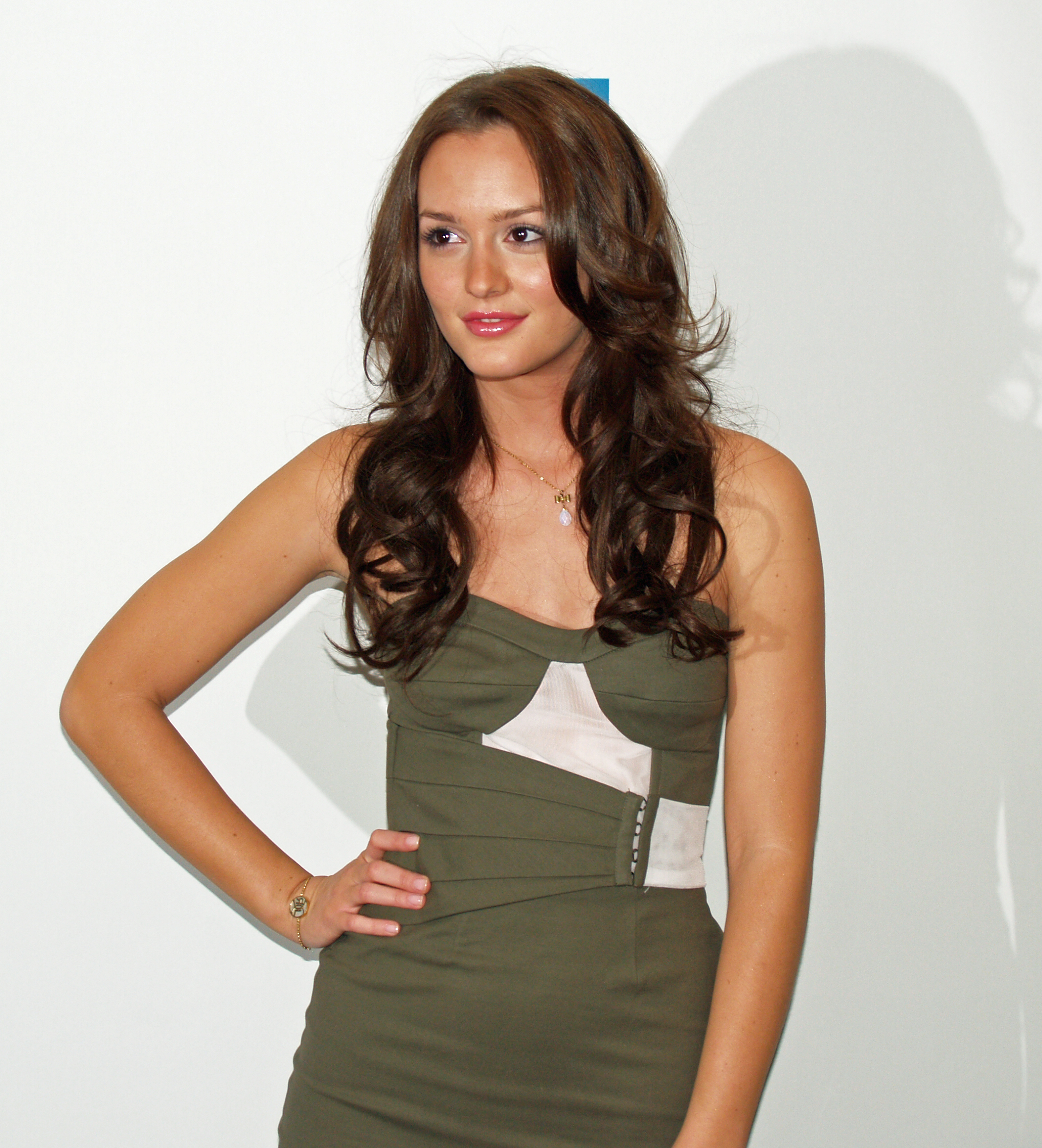
Actress and singer Leighton Meester at the 2008 Tribeca Film Festival premiere of Killer Movie

Killer Movie was filmed in 21 days. Filming locations included Chambers Hotel in Minneapolis, Minnesota and Withrow Elementary School in Withrow, Minnesota. Some scenes were shot at St. Paul Academy in Saint Paul, Minnesota.

Kaley Cuoco and Paul Wesley have previously appeared together on television series 8 Simple Rules and they are both advocates for The Humane Society. Cuoco described working with Wesley by saying: "I first met Paul when I was 16 and he did an episode of 8 Simple Rules. We filmed Killer Movie three years ago, and he was just as sweet and nice as he was when we met. He's always been hot."

The film was Jeff Fisher's feature directorial debut. Fisher had previously directed episodes of reality television shows The Simple Life, DanceLife and The Real World. Paul Wesley praised Fisher as "the kind of director I want to work with… cool, smart, supportive and exceptional." Wesley also stated that he "had a great time on Killer Movie… one of the best experiences for me as an actor and I made a lot of great friends."

== Release ==
The film originally had a release date in the summer of 2008. It was also released to Video On Demand in winter 2008.

== Reception ==
David Nusair of Reel Film Reviews said the film "suffers from a pervadingly humdrum atmosphere that effectively cements its place as a watchable yet entirely uninvolving horror endeavor."

== Related media ==
Killer Movie: Director's Cut was released on August 27, 2021 in the United States.
