= Staci Flood =

American dancer (born 1974)

- Born: December 10, 1974 (age 51); Santa Clara, California, USA
- Occupations: Singer, dancer, model

Staci Beth Codorniz Lavine Costa de Souza Flood (born December 10, 1974) is an American singer, dancer, and model best known for her lead dance roles in the music videos "Bailamos" by Enrique Iglesias (1999) and "Rock Your Body" by Justin Timberlake (2003).

== Career ==
She was once a member of the burlesque troupe The Pussycat Dolls and appeared with them in the film Charlie's Angels: Full Throttle, credited as a "Treasure Chest Dancer" (2003) and the music video for "Trouble" by Pink. She was also a part of a dance troupe, the "Bombshells" in a show called Happy Hour (USA Network, 1999) hosted by Dweezil Zappa and Ahmet Zappa. After the Dolls were recast in 2003, Flood and ex-Dolls Carmen Electra and Nadine Ellis formed a similar burlesque troupe called "The Bombshell Babies". She has also gone on tour with Latin pop singer Paulina Rubio.

Flood modelled for the magazine Maxim (2005), Lowrider (2004) and was Ms. February in the 2007 Maxim calendar.

In 2007, Flood appeared on the MTV's reality TV series DanceLife with Jennifer Lopez. Her appearance on DanceLife saw her involvement in various jobs, including a GAP commercial and creating a song ("B Ur Lover") and a music video. Her 2007 single release was called "Do You Want It Right Now". She was reported to be working on a debut album called FLOOD, and saw a single called "Higher Frequency" released to iTunes in August 2010.

She married Travis Case in 2017.

== Discography ==
=== Singles ===
- 2007 "Do You Want It Right Now"
- 2008 "Paper Therapy"
- 2010 "Higher Frequency"

=== Promo singles ===
- 2007 "B Ur Lover"

=== Other songs ===
- "Arriba"
- "Do You Want It Right Now (Remix)"

== Music videos ==
Flood has been active on several music videos during the '90s and until now. Her notable music video appearances are listed as follows:

- "Come On Over (All I Want Is You)" by Christina Aguilera
- "Bailamos" by Enrique Iglesias
- "We Fit Together" by O-Town
- "Rock Your Body" by Justin Timberlake
- "Country Girl (Shake It for Me)" by Luke Bryan
- "Don't Cha" by Pussycat Dolls
