= Grosse Pointe (TV series) =

American sitcom television series

- Genre: Sitcom
- Created by: Darren Star
- Starring: Irene Molloy; William Ragsdale; Al Santos; Lindsay Sloane; Bonnie Somerville; Kohl Sudduth; Kyle Howard
- Theme music composer: Mousse T.; Errol Rennalls
- Opening theme: "Sex Bomb (Peppermint Disco Mix)" by Tom Jones and Mousse T.
- Composer: Mark Mothersbaugh
- Country of origin: United States
- Original language: English
- No. of seasons: 1
- No. of episodes: 17

Production
- Camera setup: Single-camera
- Running time: 21 minutes
- Production companies: Darren Star Productions; Artists Television Group; Columbia TriStar Television Distribution

Original release
- Network: The WB
- Release: September 22, 2000 – February 18, 2001

Grosse Pointe is an American sitcom television series which aired on The WB from September 22, 2000, to February 18, 2001. Created by Darren Star, it was a satire depicting the behind-the-scenes drama on the set of a television show, and was inspired largely by Star's experiences as creator and producer of the nighttime soap Beverly Hills, 90210.

== Series overview ==
The series takes place in Los Angeles, on the set of a fictitious WB nighttime soap, also called Grosse Pointe, and several characters were based on real-life actors. The fictitious Grosse Pointe ("a misguided 90210 rip-off", as Star describes it) is set in the wealthy Michigan suburb, and was very much a parody of teenage nighttime soaps.

Reportedly, Beverly Hills 90210 producer Aaron Spelling called WB executive Jamie Kellner to complain about Lindsay Sloane's character Marcy Sternfeld, who in the original pilot was a thinly veiled parody of Spelling's daughter, actress Tori Spelling.

Darren Star asked several actors from Spelling-produced shows to appear on the series. Jason Priestley and Joe E. Tata from Beverly Hills, 90210 appeared in separate episodes, with Priestley directing the episode in which he appeared. Kristin Davis from Melrose Place also appeared in an episode. Katie Wagner, who hosted a Beverly Hills, 90210 special in 1993, also appeared on the show as herself for one episode. Former Saved by the Bell teen star Elizabeth Berkley appeared in the series finale.

In addition, several actors from other WB series appeared as themselves on Grosse Pointe, such as Leslie Bibb and Carly Pope of Popular and Sarah Michelle Gellar of Buffy the Vampire Slayer.

== Broadcast ==
Grosse Pointe was on the WB's Friday line-up in between Sabrina the Teenage Witch and Popular. The show lost much of the lead-in audience, and was moved to Sundays (a joke in the episode "The Opposite of Sex" references this, as the fictional show garners its highest ratings ever but fails to "beat Sabrina"). Grosse Pointe was canceled in February 2001 after 17 episodes.

== Cast ==
=== Main characters ===
- Irene Molloy as Hunter Fallow, who plays Becky Johnson on the primetime soap Grosse Pointe, a parody of Shannen Doherty and her 90210 character Brenda Walsh
- Al Santos as Johnny Bishop, who plays Becky's brother Brad Johnson on Grosse Pointe, a parody of Jason Priestley and 90210's Brandon Walsh
- Lindsay Sloane as Marcy Sternfeld, who plays Becky's best friend Kim Peterson, then her long-lost sister Lynn on Grosse Pointe, originally a parody of Tori Spelling and 90210's Donna Martin
- Bonnie Somerville as Courtney Scott, who plays Becky and Brad's orphaned cousin Laura Johnson, a parody of Tiffani-Amber Thiessen's 90210 character Valerie Malone, a replacement character
- Kohl Sudduth as Quentin Barbary King, who plays Becky's boyfriend Stone Anders, a parody of Luke Perry and 90210's Dylan McKay
- Kyle Howard as Dave May, the stand-in who later gets a role on the show, a parody of Brian Austin Green and 90210's David Silver
- William Ragsdale as Rob Fields, producer, a parody of Darren Star
- Joely Fisher as Hope Lustig (episode 1, recurring episodes 2–5), producer, in opening credits in pilot only then credited as "special guest star" as Fisher left the show to star in the sitcom Normal, Ohio
- Nat Faxon as Kevin (episodes 14–17, recurring 1–13), production assistant

=== Recurring characters ===
- Michael Hitchcock as Richard Towers, who plays Becky and Brad's father Ted Johnson on Grosse Pointe, secretly lusts after his on-screen son, a parody of James Eckhouse and his 90210 character Jim Walsh

== Episodes ==
No.	Title	Directed by	Written by	Original release date	Prod. code
1	"Pilot"	Andrew Fleming	Darren Star	September 22, 2000	37–01000
A new cast member arrives on the set of Grosse Pointe, the WB's hottest teen drama.
2	"Thieves Like Us"	Andrew Fleming	Darren Star	September 29, 2000	37–01001
Hunter enlists Marcy in her plan to get new girl Courtney fired.
3	"Prelude to a Kiss"	Andrew Fleming	Ellen Idelson & Rob Lotterstein	October 6, 2000	37–01002
Hunter tries to stop Courtney and Quentin's characters from kissing while Marcy throws a party to spend more time with Johnny.
4	"Devil in a Blue Dress"	Jake Kasdan	Darin Henry	October 13, 2000	37–01003
Hunter has a personality change when she tries to gain weight for a film audition.
5	"Halloween"	Jake Kasdan	Wendy Engelberg & Amy Engelberg	October 20, 2000	37–01004
Marcy gets hurt during a stunt, and has a falling out with Hunter.
6	"Mommy Dearest"	Peyton Reed	Will Gluck	October 27, 2000	37–01005
Hunter's recently-sober mother Helena (Shareen Mitchell) gets a guest role on the show as Johnny and Courtney face off against Carly Pope and Leslie Bibb of Popular.
7	"Sleeping with the Enemy"	Peyton Reed	Ellen Idelson & Rob Lotterstein	November 5, 2000	37–01006
The cast attends Johnny's movie premiere.
8	"Satisfaction"	Andrew Fleming	Robin Schiff	November 12, 2000	37–01007
New executive producer Shawn (Lisa Edelstein) arrives with ideas to take the show in a different direction.
9	"Boys on the Side"	Allison Anders	Darren Star	November 19, 2000	37–01008
Courtney's boyfriend Deegan (Ryan Scott Greene) makes a bad impression on the rest of the cast.
10	"Puppet Master"	Jim Fall	Will Gluck	November 26, 2000	37–01009
Hunter's ex Jonah (Bernard van Bilderbeek) directs an episode.
11	"Star Wars"	Allison Anders	Darin Henry	December 17, 2000	37–01010
Hunter gets a restraining order against Quentin.
12	"Barenaked in America"	Dennis Erdman	Robin Schiff & Will Gluck	January 7, 2001	37–01011
Racy photos of Courtney appear in a magazine.
13	"Secrets & Lies"	Alan Myerson	Darren Star	January 14, 2001	37–01012
Dave wants to break off his secret fling with volatile Hunter, while Marcy gets in touch with her Jewish side.
14	"End of the Affair"	Dennis Erdman	Ellen Idelson & Rob Lotterstein	February 4, 2001	37–01013
Dave is tempted to stay with Hunter for the financial perks.
15	"Opposite of Sex"	Jason Priestley	Will Gluck	February 11, 2001	37–01014
Jason Priestley becomes Quentin's Sex Obsessives Anonymous sponsor, and Marcy worries about an audience vote deciding whether her character lives or dies.
16	"Passion Fish"	Darren Star	Darren Star	February 16, 2001	37–01016
Marcy's friend Sarah Michelle Gellar guest stars on the show and Quentin takes credit for helping a hit-and-run victim he actually hit.
17	"My Best Friend's Wedding"	Alan Myerson	Robin Schiff	February 18, 2001	37–01015
Hunter decides to marry someone she just met, and hires Elizabeth Berkley to be a celebrity bridesmaid.

== Critical and public reaction ==
Critics were largely positive towards Grosse Pointe. Time wrote that it was "nicely cast and smartly paced, it's a sassy, catty riot." The New York Daily News wrote that it was "the funniest, smartest comedy" that the WB has ever had. It was the only WB comedy to receive an "A" grade from Entertainment Weekly.

Despite this, the series struggled with low ratings. In its Friday night timeslot, it typically lost an average of one million viewers from its lead-in, Sabrina, the Teenage Witch. Though the network tried to find an audience for it by moving it around the schedule, Grosse Pointe ultimately failed to attract enough viewers to sustain it past one season.

== Home media ==
DVD cover featuring the cast

On the DVD audio commentary for the Grosse Pointe pilot episode, Star explained that the behind-the-scenes antics on the set of 90210 were often more interesting than the show itself, and that the idea of creating a comedy based on this had been kicking around in his head for years.

In January 2006, Sony Pictures Home Entertainment announced that Grosse Pointe would be released on DVD on March 14, 2006. The DVD was later quietly taken off the schedule, and several months later, it was announced that it would be released as an Amazon.com exclusive on November 7, 2006. However, it was delayed yet again, but the DVD finally shipped in late November.

On December 4, 2006, Sony announced that the DVD would be widely released on February 13, 2007.

The opening titles and theme song only appear once on each disc of the DVD set, in the pilot episode for disc 1 and in "Puppet Master" for disc 2, because the use of "Sex Bomb" by Tom Jones was deemed too expensive to use in every episode. All other episodes had to be reedited to remove the opening titles. The cast credits, along with episode names, are shown over each episode's opening scene instead. The version of the titles that is used on DVDs is the standard version seen throughout the series not the original pilot version which featured Joely Fisher or the final version which included Nat Faxon.

DVD extras include an interview with Darren Star and commentary tracks on the following episodes:

- "Pilot" (with Darren Star)
- "Devil in a Blue Dress" (with Darren Star and co-executive producer Robin Schiff)
- "Satisfaction" (with Darren Star and Robin Schiff)
- "Secrets and Lies" (with Darren Star and Robin Schiff)

The DVD release jacket of disc 2 has a misprint with two of the episode descriptions. Star Wars's description says that Marcy gets a restraining order to stop Quentin's harassment; it is actually Hunter who gets the restraining order. End of the Affair's description says that Dave looks for the courage to break up with Marcy; again, it is actually Hunter that he is trying to break up with.
