= Mustang Sally (film) =

- Directed by: Iren Koster
- Written by: Iren Koster
- Cinematography: Aldo Antonelli
- Edited by: Marcus Manton
- Release date: June 2006
- Running time: 85 minutes
- Country: United States
- Language: English

Mustang Sally is a 2006 horror film starring Elizabeth Daily, Mark Anthony Parrish, Lindsey Labrum, Don Wallace, Erik Fellows and Al Santos. Six friends think that they are going to a house of prostitution, but encounter danger instead.

The title is a reference to the rhythm and blues tune "Mustang Sally", popularized by Wilson Pickett and later featured in several movies. It also has a jazz score by trumpeter Terence Blanchard.

The German version (it is customary in Germany to have movies dubbed by German voices) features many well-known German voice actors, e. g. Torsten Muenchow (German voice for Antonio Banderas, Brendan Fraser, Alec Baldwin, Gérard Depardieu and others), Michael Habeck (German voice for Danny DeVito, Ernie from Sesame Street and others), Tim Schwarzmaier (German voice for Harry Potter).

The movie was released in Germany "direct to DVD" approximately beginning of February 2007.

== Premise ==
Be careful what you wish for. Six college guys think they are going to a bordello and instead end up in a horror house. Full of sick and twisted harlots with an appetite for blood and carnage.

== Cast ==
- Elizabeth Daily as Sally "Mustang Sally"
- Lindsey Labrum as Caressa
- Tina McDowelle as "Persuasion"
- Deidre A. Cannon as "Likilick"
- Dana Fares as "Kitten"
- Kim Holman as Janice
- Julian Jackson as "Midnite"
- Joni Kempner as Titianna
- Alycen Malone as Tushalean
- Mark Parrish as Josh Henderson
- Erik Fellows as Mike
- Garrison Koch as Luke
- Sonny Marler as Toby
- Al Santos as Ryan
- Sean McGene as Seamus
- Cristian Burea as Lukas
- Phillip Troy Linger as Sheriff Lloyd Stevens
- Lisa K. Crosato as Mrs. Parsons
- Don Wallace as Mr. Roth
- Pam Braswell as Aunt Rita
- Teebone Mitchell as Jesse
- Iren Koster as "Popsie"
- Jeff Pickel as Frank
- Barry Primus as Dr. Koshansky
