= This Country Is Bad Ass =

Single by Sasha Pieterse

"This Country Is Badass"

Single by Sasha Pieterse

from the album TBA
- Released: April 12, 2013
- Genre: Country rock
- Length: 3:55
- Label: Dan Franklin Music
- Songwriter(s): Sasha Pieterse; Dan Franklin; Mandie Pinto
- Producer(s): Dan Franklin

Sasha Pieterse singles chronology
"This Country Is Badass" (2013)	"R.P.M." (2013)

"This Country Is Bad Ass", is the debut single of South African-American actress-singer Sasha Pieterse. It was released on 11 April 2013, a day earlier than its official release date. The song was written by Pieterse, Mandie Pinto and Dan Franklin who also produced it.

== Background and release ==
On what inspired the track's patriotic theme, Pieterse revealed, “We just got together and decided well what do we want to write about?” She added, “I just love this country so much and I would never have been able to be where I am if I wasn't in America so we decided to come up with this track. I just want people to know that I love my country, this is home. Even though I wasn't born here, I'm so proud to be here” She also stated, “People have kind of forgotten that working hard is huge, and that's what you need to do to get where you want. You can't just sit back and let things happen, and the great thing about this country is you can work for what you want. You can sit there and not do anything, and that's where you'll be for the rest of your life, or you can work hard and set a goal and achieve that. That's what this country is all about. That's the American Dream, and I think it's fantastic.” She also addressed how some people may misperceive the song based on the title. “I think people can form, maybe, a wrong opinion by the name of it. It's just about how amazing this country is. It's OK to be patriotic about your country. People in my age group, we've kind of, I think, forgotten where we came from. The history of this country — it's your morals, it’s, you know, your grounding. It’s kind of a last thought. People don’t really care about it. Unfortunately, eventually you will care about it when it actually affects you.”

== Chart positions ==
Pieterse announced that the song charted within the top ten on iTunes in numerous countries including South Africa, Ireland and the United Kingdom.

== Track listing ==
- Digital download
1. "This Country is Bad Ass" – 3:55
