= Parker Young =

American actor

- Born: 1988 or 1989 (age 37–38)
- Occupations: Actor, model
- Years active: 2008–present
- Spouse: Stephanie Webber (m. 2021)
- Children: 2

Parker Young (born 1988 or 1989) is an American actor. He portrayed Ryan Shay on the ABC sitcom Suburgatory, Randy Hill on the Fox sitcom Enlisted and Richard on the Bravo series Imposters. His most recent starring role, he played a former Marine adjusting to civilian life on the CBS sitcom United States of Al. Young has also modeled for Tommy Hilfiger and Calvin Klein.

== Early life and education ==
Young is the eldest of three children born to Karl and Zarina Young. He has a brother Nelson and a sister Alexis. He attended Catalina Foothills High School where he was football captain, occupying the position of running back. His interest in theatre surfaced when he was in junior year. After graduating, Young moved to Los Angeles to pursue an acting career while he first planned to attend Pepperdine University.

== Career ==
From 2011 to 2014, Young played the recurring role of dim-witted football jock Ryan Shay on the ABC sitcom Suburgatory. In 2013, he landed a lead role on Fox's military comedy series Enlisted and, in 2015, a recurring role on Arrow.

In 2016, he was cast in the third Bravo original scripted series, Imposters, which premiered on February 7, 2017.

In July 2018, he and his fiancée, Stephanie Webber, welcomed a daughter named Jaxon Orion Young. The couple married in September 2021.

In late 2019, Young was cast in a lead role for the CBS sitcom United States of Al, which premiered on April 1, 2021. In 2024, he portrayed Ranger Sam Campbell — Rafael L. Silva's on-screen law enforcement partner — in Ryan Murphy's television series 9-1-1: Lone Star.

He is currently starring in Eternally Yours, a CBS comedy series, which was picked up for a 2026-2027 series order in April 2026.

== Filmography ==
Film
Year	Title	Role	Notes
2008	Gingerdead Man 2: Passion of the Crust	Cornelius Entemann	
2009	Nightfall	Avery	
2010	Cupid's Arrow	Tony	
2014	Animal	Jeff	
2014	Tainted Rose	Anthony	
2014	Sex Ed	Montana	
2014	Polis	David	Short film
2015	4th Man Out	Chris	
2016	The Boss	Moisa	Uncredited
2022	Give Me an A	Mark	
2024	The Image of You	Nick	

Television
Year	Title	Role	Notes
2008	Days of Our Lives	Delivery man	Season 43, episode 293
2010	Big Time Rush	Travis	Episode: "Big Time Break"
2010	Make It or Break It	Hunk #1	Episode: "Party Gone Out of Bounds"
2011–14	Suburgatory	Ryan Shay	Recurring role (27 episodes)
2011	CSI: NY	Thad Wolff	Episode: "Get Me Out of Here!"
2012	Mad Men	Jim Hanson	Episode: "Signal 30"
2012	Jane by Design	Aiden Chase	Episode: "The Celebrity"
2013	Killer Reality	Ross Freeman	Television film
2014	Enlisted	Private Randy Hill	Main role (13 episodes)
2014	Things You Shouldn't Say Past Midnight	Leo	5 episodes
2015	Fresh Off the Boat	Wyatt	Episode: "Phillip Goldstein"
2015–16	Arrow	Alex Davis	Recurring role (10 episodes)
2016	Cooper Barrett's Guide to Surviving Life	Shane	Episode: "How to Survive Your Crazy Ex"
2017	Future Man	Chase	Episode: "Operation: Fatal Attraction"
2017–18	Imposters	Richard	Main role (20 episodes)
2018	I Feel Bad	Damon Paul	Recurring role (2 episodes)
2018	The Wedding Do Over	Peter Clark	Television Film
2019	Hell's Kitchen	Himself	Represented St. Jude Children's Research Hospital; Episode: "Poor Trev"
2020–21	Twenties	Zach	Recurring role (11 episodes)
2020	A Million Little Things	Miles	Recurring role (3 episodes)
2021–22	United States of Al	Riley Dugan	Main role (35 episodes)
2022	Call Me Kat	Brian	Episode: "Call Me Donor Four-Five-Seven"
2024	9-1-1: Lone Star	Ranger Sam Campbell	Recurring role (4 episodes)
2025	Going Dutch	Special Agent Rick Silver	Episode: "CIA"
2026	Best Medicine	Blaze	Episode: "All the World's Ablaze"
2026-present	Eternally Yours	Jesse	Series regular
