= Black Widow (2007 film) =

2007 television film directed by Armand Mastroianni

- Promotional poster
- Written by: Riley Weston
- Story by: Riley Weston; Jeremy Bernstein
- Directed by: Armand Mastroianni
- Starring: Elizabeth Berkley; Alicia Coppola; Adriana DeMeo; Randall Batinkoff; Barbara Niven; Tembi Locke; Joel Anderson; Brady Smith; David Ury
- Music by: Zack Ryan
- Country of origin: United States
- Original language: English

Production
- Producers: Erik Heiberg; James Wilberger
- Cinematography: Mark Mervis
- Editor: Christine Kelley
- Running time: 89 minutes
- Production company: Larry Levinson Productions

Original release
- Network: Lifetime
- Release: 2007

Black Widow is a 2007 television film directed by Armand Mastroianni and starring Elizabeth Berkley, Alicia Coppola and Adriana DeMeo. Produced by RHI Entertainment, it is loosely based on the 1987 film of the same name starring Debra Winger and Theresa Russell.

Black Widow stars Elizabeth Berkley, Randall Batinkoff, and Adriana DeMeo.

The film was originally released in 2007, before being re-cut and re-released in 2008 under the title Dark Beauty.

== Plot ==
Olivia, a young, beautiful, brilliant, and effortlessly charming woman, works as a dedicated charity worker, responsible for establishing free clinics across the country for poor women. When she meets millionaire Danny Keegan, the pair soon form a relationship and he falls for her. However, it soon becomes clear that not everyone admires Olivia. Danny’s college friend, Melanie, a photo journalist for the Los Angeles Post, thinks that there is something suspicious about Olivia and soon wants to learn more about the mysterious woman.

With the help of her assistant, Finn, Melanie discovers the truth about Olivia, finding out that her Ph.D. is fake, that she is responsible for many acts of embezzlement, and that she has another lover on the side. Then she discovers Olivia’s numerous identities, the multiple marriages that have left her very rich, and the suspicious deaths of each of her husbands. Soon enough, Olivia realizes that Melanie is on to her and begins to take action against her. She will do anything to protect herself, even if it comes to murder.

In the end, after much difficulty, Melanie manages to expose Olivia as the evil woman she truly is to everyone, including Danny, and Olivia gets her well-earned comeuppance when the arriving police shoot her to death after Olivia mindlessly attempts to shoot them. Afterwards, Melanie successfully publishes Olivia's story for the Los Angeles Post, and she and Danny begin to start a friendship.

== Cast ==
- Elizabeth Berkley as Olivia Whitfield / Grace Miller
- Alicia Coppola as 'Mel' Melanie Dempsey
- Adriana DeMeo as Finn Driver
- Randall Batinkoff as Danny Keegan
- Barbara Niven as Tiffany Collins
- Tembi Locke as Jill Keegan
- Joel Anderson as Cooper Collins
- Brady Smith as Lucas Miller
- David Ury as Edward Bixler
- Jeremy Howard as Henry
- Steve Monroe as Matty Keegan
- George Wyner as Stan Driver
- Chris Farah as Receptionist
- Carla Jimenez as Rosa
- Jim Palmer as Detective Harris

== Reception ==
David Nusair, writing for Reel Film Reviews said that the film is, "Salacious enough to ensure that boredom never entirely sets in."
