= Al Santos =

American actor

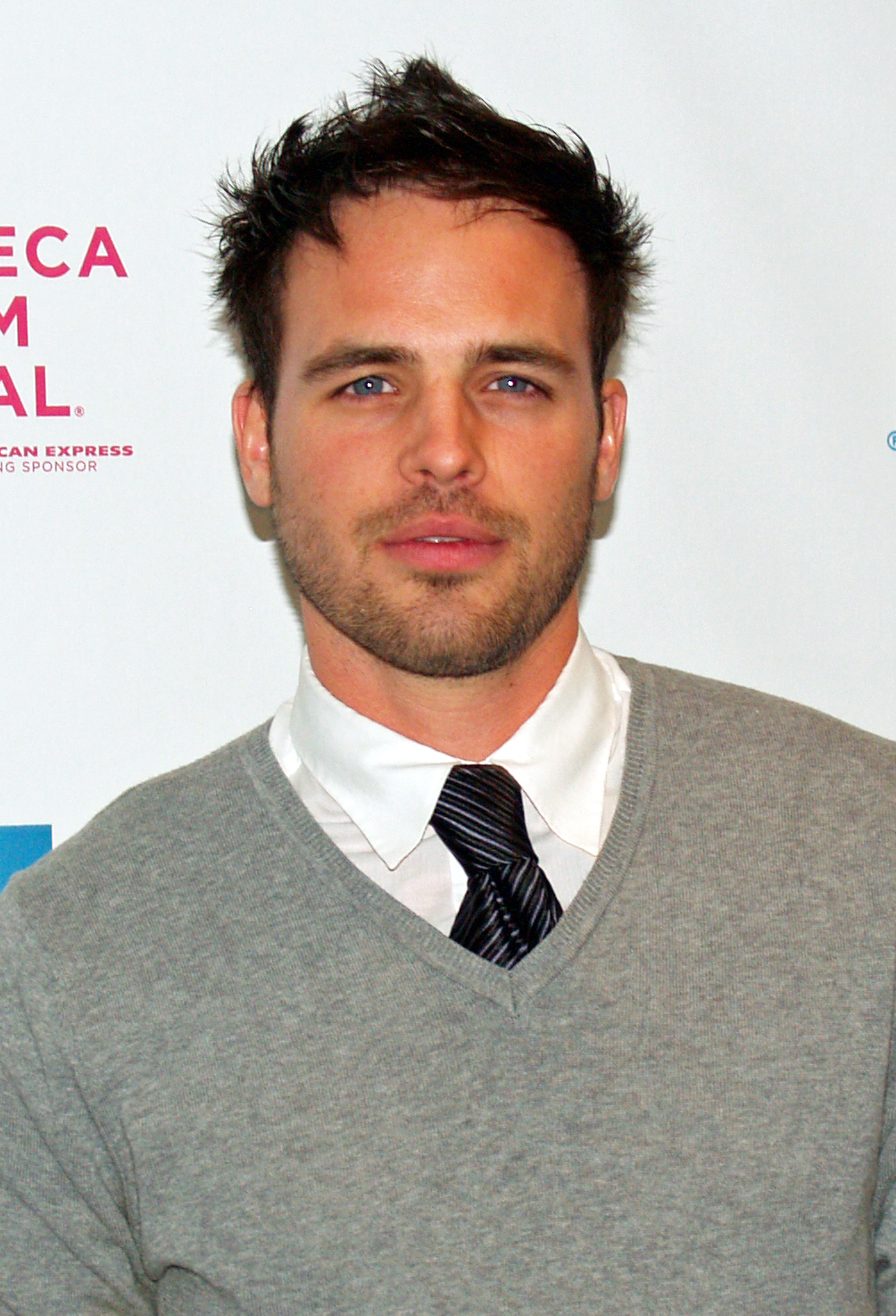
- Santos at the premiere of Killer Movie at the 2008 Tribeca Film Festival
- Born: Alfredo Santos; New York City, New York
- Occupations: Actor, model
- Years active: 1991–2013

Alfredo Santos is an American actor and former model. Born in New York City, Santos studied Sciences at Hunter College. Santos is of Mexican descent. He is best known for playing the character of Johnny Bishop in the WB TV series Grosse Pointe.

== Career ==
Santos was a model from 1991 until 2002. In 1991, when he was 15, he was discovered by Ford Modeling Agency. They then signed him to be the face of Versace. He has modelled clothing for top fashion names such as Armani, Valentino, and Abercrombie & Fitch. He has also featured on the covers of magazines Seventeen, YM, Teen Vogue, American Fitness, and Elle.

Santos is known for his character Dante Belasco in Jeepers Creepers 2, and also had starring roles in the television series The Help and Grosse Pointe. He also made guest appearances on CSI: NY. Santos also starred in the horror film Speed Demons, alongside Sticky Fingaz, Marina Sirtis, Terry Kiser and Angela Sarafyan, directed by Dan García.

Santos is the president and founder of Stronghold Productions, Inc, an entertainment film company in Beverly Hills, California.

== Personal life ==
He is the brother of Chris Santos and Patrick Santos, who are also actors.

== Filmography ==
=== Film ===
Year	Title	Role	Notes
2003	Jeepers Creepers 2	Dante Belasco	
2006	Mustang Sally	Ryan	Lead cast
2007	Lost Signal / Dead of Winter	Kevin Healy	Lead role
2007	American Gangster	Alfredo Luis Santos, The Mechanic	Small role
2008	Killer Movie	Luke	
2009	2 Dudes and a Dream	Chucky Stevenson	
2011	Love Is a Hurtin' Thing: The Lou Rawls Story	Marlon Brando	Lead role Writer; Pre-production
2011	Geezas	Paul	Small role Co-producer; Post-production
2012	Speed Demons	Chance	

=== Television ===
Year	Title	Role	Notes
2000–2001	Grosse Pointe	Johnny Bishop / Brad Johnson	17 episodes Lead role
2001	Nash Bridges	Matthew, Cassidy Bridges Boy	(uncredited); 2 episodes
2001	That's Life	Peter	1 episode
2004	The Help	Ollie, The Chauffeur	7 episode Lead role
2007–2008	CSI: NY	Ollie Barnes	2 episodes
