= Jennifer Murphy =

American beauty pageant queen and reality television contestant

- Murphy at the 2008 Tribeca Film Festival
- Born: Jennifer Murphy; March 19, 1979 (age 47); Medford, Oregon, U.S.
- Height: 1.73 m (5 ft 8 in)
- Spouse: Bill Dorfman (m. 2006; div. 2007)
- Beauty pageant titleholder
- Title: Miss Oregon USA 2004
- Hair color: Blonde
- Eye color: Brown
- Major competition: Miss USA 2004 (Top 10)
- Website: https://www.jennifermurphy.com/

Jennifer Murphy (born March 19, 1979) is an American personality and former beauty pageant contestant.

== Career ==
=== Pageants ===
Murphy won the Miss Oregon USA title in late 2003, having previously competed in the Miss Oregon system for Miss America. She represented Oregon at the Miss USA 2004 pageant held in April 2004 in the Kodak Theatre in Hollywood, Los Angeles. Murphy placed in the top ten in the pageant, which was won by Shandi Finnessey of Missouri.

Murphy has remained involved in pageants, hosting the Miss Oregon USA 2006 pageant, and judging the Miss South Carolina Teen USA 2006 pageant. She has also been a judge for the Miss Washington pageant, the Miss Oregon pageant 2009 and the Miss Malibu 2010 pageants.

=== Television projects ===
Murphy appeared on the fourth season of The Apprentice. Murphy was "fired" in the sixth week, along with three others. Murphy first spoke to Donald Trump about the possibility of appearing on his show when she was competing at the Miss USA pageant. The pageant is part of the Miss Universe Organization, which was previously owned by Trump.

In October 2016, Murphy told Grazia that Trump had offered her job interviews a day after she had left The Apprentice. As she was leaving after an interview, a newly married Trump kissed her on the lips, which took her by surprise. Murphy said she ultimately declined his job offer, and that she would still vote for Trump in the 2016 US presidential election.

After appearing on The Apprentice in New York, she relocated to Los Angeles, California, and pursued a career in entertainment. Murphy appeared in her first feature film Killer Movie, playing the role of Mrs. Falls, and appeared in an episode of CSI, playing the role of "Dream Girl".

== "I want to be NEENJA!" song ==
In April 2016, Murphy uploaded a video on her YouTube channel performing her song "I want to be NEENJA!" at a private party promoting her line of Murphy beds. In July 2016, Murphy removed the YouTube video and released an apology on Facebook after the video was shared on social media criticizing Murphy for her impersonation of an accent and lyrics featuring Asian stereotypes. Despite the removal of the video and apology, the song and references to the song can still be found in other videos uploaded to her YouTube channel. The video was re-uploaded on January 24, 2021.

== Personal life ==
Murphy married Bill Dorfman, a dentist from ABC's reality show Extreme Makeover, on July 7, 2006. They were married at the Trump National Golf Club in Los Angeles. She filed for divorce on July 9, 2007.

== Filmography ==
Filmography
Year	Title	Role	Notes
2004	Miss USA	Herself	TV special; Miss Oregon USA (Top 10)
2005	The Apprentice	Herself	Contestant; 8 episodes
2007	C.S.I.	Dream Girl	Episode: "Lab Rats"
2008	Killer Movie	Mrs. Falls	
2024	I Want to Be Neenja! The Movie	Jennifer Murphy 'GoGirl' (and Others)	

Preceded by Myah Moore	Miss Oregon USA; 2004	Succeeded by Jessica Carlson
