= The Baytown Outlaws =

- Directed by: Barry Battles
- Written by: Barry Battles; Griffin Hood
- Produced by: William O. Perkins III; Robert Teitel
- Starring: Andre Braugher; Clayne Crawford; Daniel Cudmore; Travis Fimmel; Eva Longoria; Paul Wesley; Billy Bob Thornton
- Cinematography: Dave McFarland
- Edited by: Sean Valla
- Music by: Christopher Young; Kostas Christides
- Production companies: LLeju Productions; State Street Productions
- Distributed by: Phase 4 Films (United States); Universal Pictures (International)
- Release dates: August 29, 2012 (Fantasy Filmfest); January 11, 2013 (United States)
- Country: United States
- Language: English
- Budget: $3.7 million

The Baytown Outlaws is a 2012 action comedy film directed by Barry Battles in his directorial debut, and written by Battles and Griffin Hood. The film stars Andre Braugher, Clayne Crawford, Daniel Cudmore, Travis Fimmel, Eva Longoria, Paul Wesley, and Billy Bob Thornton. The film follows the Oodie brothers - Brick, Lincoln, and McQueen - who act as vigilante killers for the local sheriff. When the trio accepts a job to rescue a young boy from his godfather, plans quickly fall apart as the brothers aim to deliver the boy to safety while pursued by groups of assassins.

== Plot ==
In Atmore, Alabama, the Oodie brothers Brick, Lincoln, and McQueen work as vigilantes for the man who raised them, Sheriff Henry Millard; they bypass the legal system to murder criminals, keeping the crime rate the lowest in the state. After one of their assaults, they are approached by Celeste, a witness to the incident, who offers them $25,000 to travel to Austin, Texas to rescue her godson Rob and kill his godfather and captor, the drug lord Carlos. The trio accepts. Meanwhile, ATF agent Anthony Reese approaches Millard about the spree of criminal deaths and his suspects; the Oodie brothers. Millard is intentionally obstructive to Reese's request for aid.

The Oodies travel to Carlos' home and assault the building, killing Carlos's men but failing to kill Carlos. They recover Rob; a young disabled man in a wheelchair. Carlos sends a group of female biker assassins after them. The bikers find the brothers resting at a bar. The bikers seduce the unaware brothers, separating them from each other, but when Lincoln notices one of them wheeling Rob away, the women attack them. The brothers manage to kill the women and recover Rob, but the massacre ends up on the news with sketches of the three brothers provided by the bar owner, giving Reese the evidence he needs that the Oodies are killers. Brick calls Celeste to find out why the simple job now involves assassins; Celeste confesses that Rob was from a wealthy family that was killed by Carlos so that he, as Rob's legal guardian, could obtain a large trust fund that Rob is to inherit on his impending 18th birthday. Brick makes a further call to Millard who tells them that because of Reese's evidence, he has to disavow them and will arrest them if they return to Alabama.

Though he cannot speak to them, the brothers bond with Rob. McQueen suggests they quit the job, but Brick tells they had a brother like Rob who was regularly beaten by their father until one day he woke up and the brother was gone. The resemblance makes Brick reluctant to let Carlos retake Rob. Another group of assassins in an armored vehicle attacks the brothers on the road and snatches Rob from the moving car. The brothers give chase and Lincoln leaps onto the vehicle, singlehandedly slaughtering everyone inside, but he is badly injured and the brothers' car is broken. While walking down the road, the group is picked up by a passing van; one of the passengers is a nurse and tends to Lincoln's wounds but he remains weakened. The group is dropped off in Vicksburg, Mississippi where they wait for Celeste and prepare for further attacks.

Reese discovers a photo of Millard recovering the brothers as children after their father's death, and large cash withdrawals he suspects were used to pay the brothers. He confronts Millard with the evidence and forces him to give up the brothers' location for a lesser jail sentence; Millard goes with Reese. A Native American gang arrives and attacks, leaving Brick and McQueen to defend Rob and Lincoln. Celeste later arrives and joins the brothers. They manage to kill most of the gang, and Lincoln recovers enough to stop one of them from taking Rob. However, Celeste and Brick are downed, and the remaining gang member attempts to scalp McQueen and is shot by Millard. Millard and the brothers are arrested; the brothers provide a false story that does not involve Celeste, allowing her to take care of Rob. Reese's success is rewarded with a transfer to manage the territory; much to his chagrin. Carlos is killed by an explosive package sent by Celeste. 57 months later, the brothers are freed from jail. They receive a letter from Celeste, enclosing their promised $25,000 payment, with a new truck waiting for them courtesy of Rob. Celeste ends the letter by saying that others could use their help.

== Cast ==
- Andre Braugher as Sheriff Henry Millard
- Clayne Crawford as Brick Oodie
- Daniel Cudmore as Lincoln "The Dixie Reaper" Oodie
- Travis Fimmel as McQueen Oodie
- Eva Longoria as Celeste Martin
- Paul Wesley as ATF Agent Anthony Reese, an ATF agent.
- Billy Bob Thornton as Carlos Lyman
- Thomas Sangster as Rob, a young disabled man and the target of the Oodie's rescue job.
- Zoë Bell as Rose
- Serinda Swan as "Jez"
- Arden Cho as Angel
- Brea Grant as Pammy
- Agnes Bruckner as Mona
- Damien Moses as Montane
- Nito Larioza as Tucker
- Bill Perkins as Mewes
- Quinn Early as "Smoke"
- Keith Woulard as Diggs
- Tim J. Smith as Rondo
- Sam Medina as Chogan
- J. LaRose as Helaku
- John Paul Shellnut as Marty
- Julio Oscar Mechoso as "Padre"
- Javier Carrasquillo as Sal
- Griffin Hood as "Dirt" Beggley
- John McConnell as Representative Hawkins
- Ritchie Montgomery as Officer Brown
- J.D. Evermore as Officer Boyd
- Michael Rapaport as "Lucky", a bar owner.
- James DuMont as ATF Special Agent Simmons
- Natalie Martinez as Ariana, an illegal immigrant and nurse.

== Production ==
The filming began in May 2011 near New Orleans, Louisiana.

== Releases ==
The Baytown Outlaws was released in the UK on both DVD and Blu-ray Disc on 26 December 2012 through Universal Pictures UK. The release includes a short behind-the-scenes documentary with the cast and crew as well as the film's trailers.

== Soundtrack ==
Intrada Records released the score by Christopher Young and Kostas Christides on August 18, 2014.

=== Track listing ===
1. Baytown Outlaws (3:58)
2. Sugar Plum Scum (2:54)
3. Longorioso (3:11)
4. Brthr Fckr (4:13)
5. When You Wish Upon A Guitar (3:16)
6. Two Pistol Coffin (5:42)
7. She Is My Shining Island Nympho (4:14)
8. Shellac Eyes (2:10)
9. Ode To Billy Bob (4:05)
10. Lay Me Down On Cold Ground (3:42)
11. Bob-A-Lo Babe (3:10)
12. Fandango Mango (4:27)
13. Searley Insane (3:30)
14. Romeo + Juliet Red and Black (3:05)

== Reviews ==
The film opened to mixed reviews. The sense was that the movie was made to capture the essence of a Robert Rodriguez or Quentin Tarantino styled movie, "but not as good," and "it has neither the stamina nor the wit to go the distance." Yet, it was deemed entertaining nonetheless. On review aggregator website Rotten Tomatoes, the film holds an approval rating of 23% based on 26 reviews, with an average rating of 4.13/10.
