= Paul Wesley =

American actor and director (born 1982)

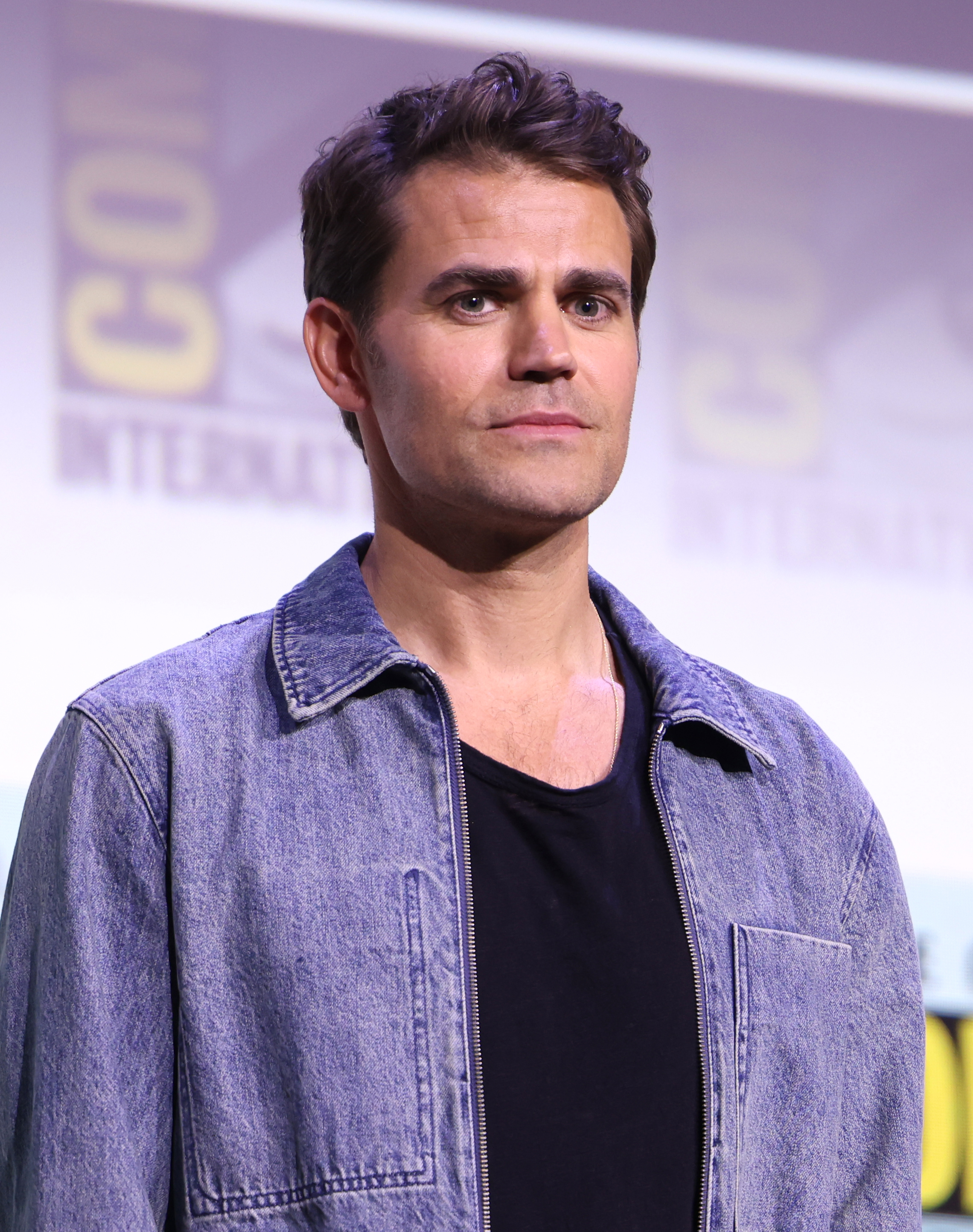
- Wesley in 2025
- Born: Paweł Tomasz Wasilewski; July 23, 1982 (age 44); New Brunswick, New Jersey, U.S.
- Other name: Paul Wasilewski
- Occupations: Actor; film director
- Years active: 1999–present
- Works: Filmography
- Spouses: Torrey DeVitto (m. 2011; div. 2013) Ines de Ramon (m. 2019; div. 2024) Natalie Kuckenburg (m. 2026)

Paweł Tomasz Wasilewski (Polish: ['pavɛw vaɕi'lɛfskʲi]; July 23, 1982), better known by his stage name Paul Wesley, is an American actor and film director. He is known for starring as Stefan Salvatore in The Vampire Diaries (2009–2017) and James T. Kirk in Star Trek: Strange New Worlds (2022–present).

In 2003, Wesley also starred as Lucas Luthor, Lex Luthor's younger brother, in the superhero series Smallville.

== Early life ==
Wesley was born Paweł Tomasz Wasilewski on July 23, 1982, in New Brunswick, New Jersey, to Polish parents Agnieszka and Tomasz Wasilewski. He grew up in Marlboro Township, New Jersey. He has one older sister, Monika Emara, and two younger sisters, Leah and Julia. In addition to English, he speaks Polish, having spent four months of every year in Poland until the age of 16. He has said he has "40% Jewish" heritage.

Wesley attended Christian Brothers Academy in Lincroft, New Jersey, and Marlboro High School for a period during his high school years. He started his theater studies in New York City and transferred from Marlboro High School to Lakewood Prep School in Howell, New Jersey, because the school was able to better accommodate his acting schedule. During his junior year in high school, he was cast in the soap opera Guiding Light as character Max Nickerson.

He started college at Rutgers University in New Jersey, but left after one semester when more roles were offered to him and he came to realize that he could make a career out of acting.

== Career ==
=== 2001–2008: Early acting roles and Fallen ===
In 2001, Wesley, then credited as Paul Wasilewski, was one of the main cast members of the short-lived CBS television series Wolf Lake, playing the role of Luke Cates. He appeared in the 2008 CBS television film The Russell Girl, and had the lead role in the 2007 ABC Family miniseries Fallen. Wesley has had a number of roles in television shows such as 24, 8 Simple Rules, American Dreams, Army Wives, Cane, Everwood, Guiding Light, Smallville, and The O.C..

=== 2009–2017: The Vampire Diaries and film roles ===
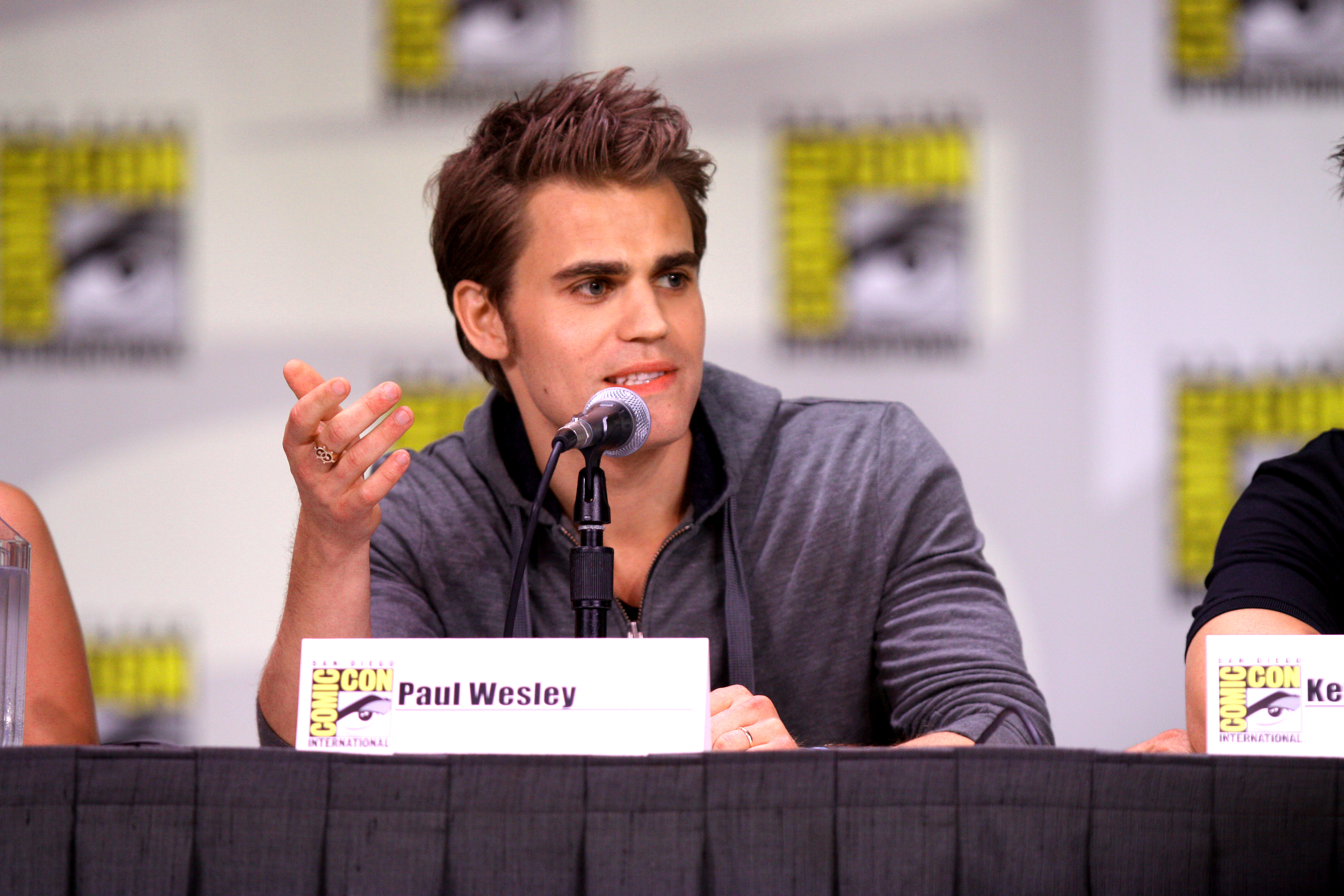
Wesley at San Diego Comic-Con in 2011

Wesley starred as Stefan Salvatore in the teen drama television series The Vampire Diaries since its premiere in September 2009 on The CW. His work garnered him two Teen Choice Awards, two Young Hollywood Awards and nominations for People's Choice Awards.

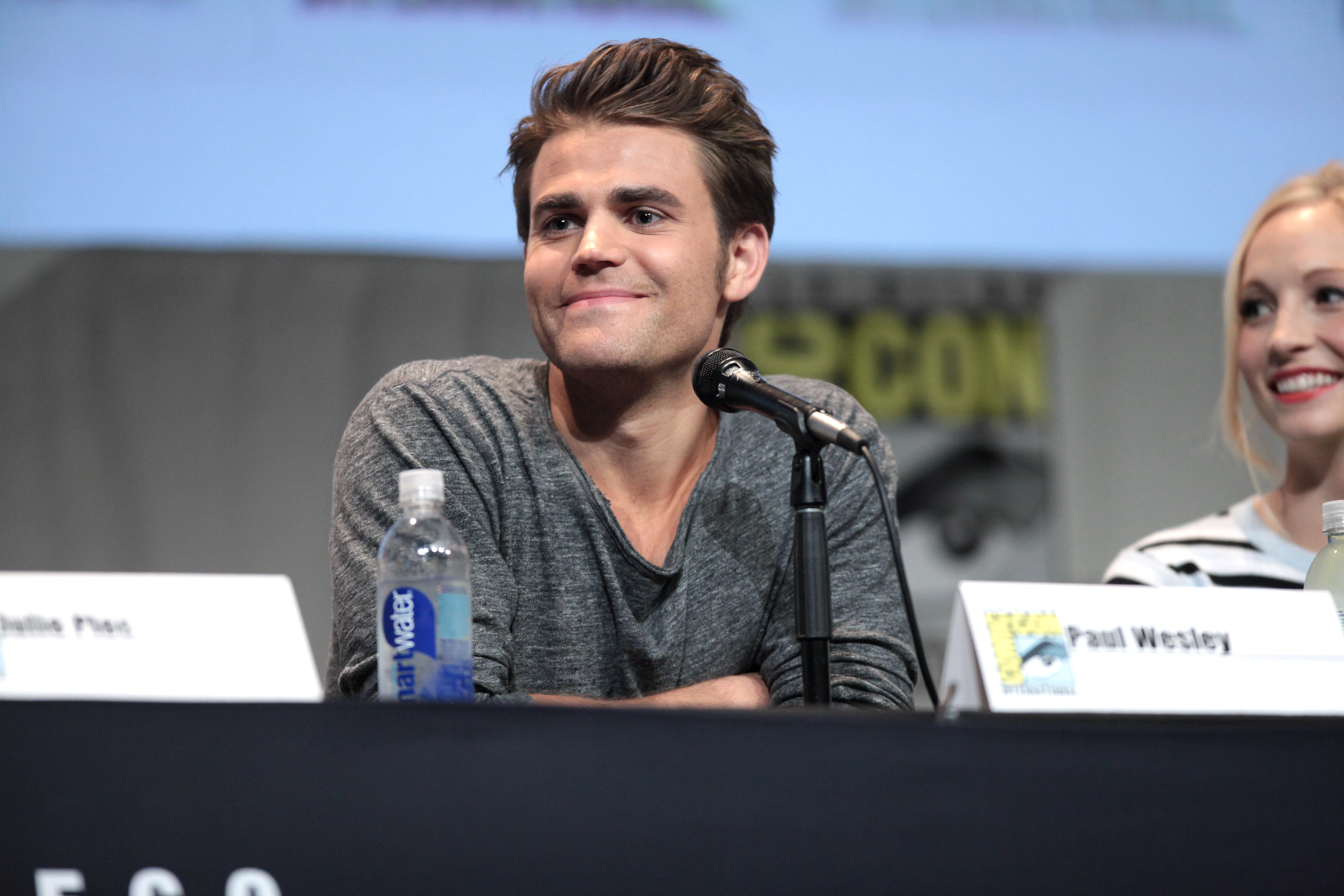
Wesley at San Diego Comic-Con in 2015

Throughout the years, he has appeared in a variety of films. In 2014, he co-starred in, as well as produced, Before I Disappear, which went on to win the SXSW Film Festival Audience Award and compete at the Venice Film Festival's "Venice Days" section. That same year he co-starred with Amira and Sam which was acquired by Drafthouse Films.

In 2014, he was cast in the film Mothers and Daughters, and it was also announced he was set to star in and produce a science fiction film called Convergence. He also co-starred in The Baytown Outlaws.

In 2016, he co-starred in the comedy The Late Bloomer. His other feature credits include HBO's Shot in the Heart directed by Agnieszka Holland and Lionsgate's Peaceful Warrior.

=== 2018–present: Directing, theatre roles, Tell Me a Story and Star Trek: Strange New Worlds ===
Wesley began directing The Vampire Diaries in its fifth season and produced the series at the start of season 8. He directed episode 16 in season 2 of Shadowhunters for Freeform. In November 2016, it was announced that under the label of his newly formed production company, Citizen Media, Wesley signed a deal with Warner Bros. Television to produce four new television shows, including Confessions of a Drug-Addicted High School Teacher, written by Jason Smith; Pecos, written by Shawn Christensen; Finding Natalie, written by Hilary Bettis and Shanghai Summer, written by Oanh Ly.

His theater work includes the co-lead in the well-received off-Broadway production Cal in Camo at the Rattlestick Theater in New York City. He was also the co-lead in Sensitive Skin, written by Shem Bitterman. In March 2018, Wesley joined the New York Theatre Workshop's production of Zurich in New York City.

In June 2018, it was reported that Wesley had joined the main cast of the CBS All Access TV series Tell Me a Story, which was created by Kevin Williamson. In 2019, Wesley's production company, Citizen Media signed a development deal at Kapital Entertainment. Other network television directing credits include Shadowhunters and Roswell, New Mexico. He also starred in the second episode of the Netflix miniseries Medal of Honor as Staff Sergeant Clint Romesha.

On March 15, 2022, it was announced Wesley was cast as James T. Kirk for the second season of Star Trek: Strange New Worlds on Paramount+. He made his first appearance on the show as a guest star in the season one finale. On February 4, 2024, at the 51st Saturn Awards, Wesley won the Saturn Award for Best Guest Star in a Television Series for his role as Kirk in Strange New Worlds.

== Other ventures ==
In 2014, Wesley was given the Humane Generation Award for his work with the Humane Society, specifically farm animal welfare.

Additionally, Wesley has hosted two fundraising campaigns on Represent.com to raise funds for charity. For his first campaign, Wesley released a cat shirt design to raise funds for The Humane Society of the United States. The campaign sold almost 3,000 units. For his second campaign, Wesley teamed up with The Vampire Diaries co-star Ian Somerhalder to release a limited-edition shirt designed by a fan, with the words "Blood Brothers Since 1864." This campaign sold almost 10,000 shirts.

In 2020, Wesley and Somerhalder announced the launch of a straight bourbon whiskey, Brother's Bond Bourbon.

== Personal life ==
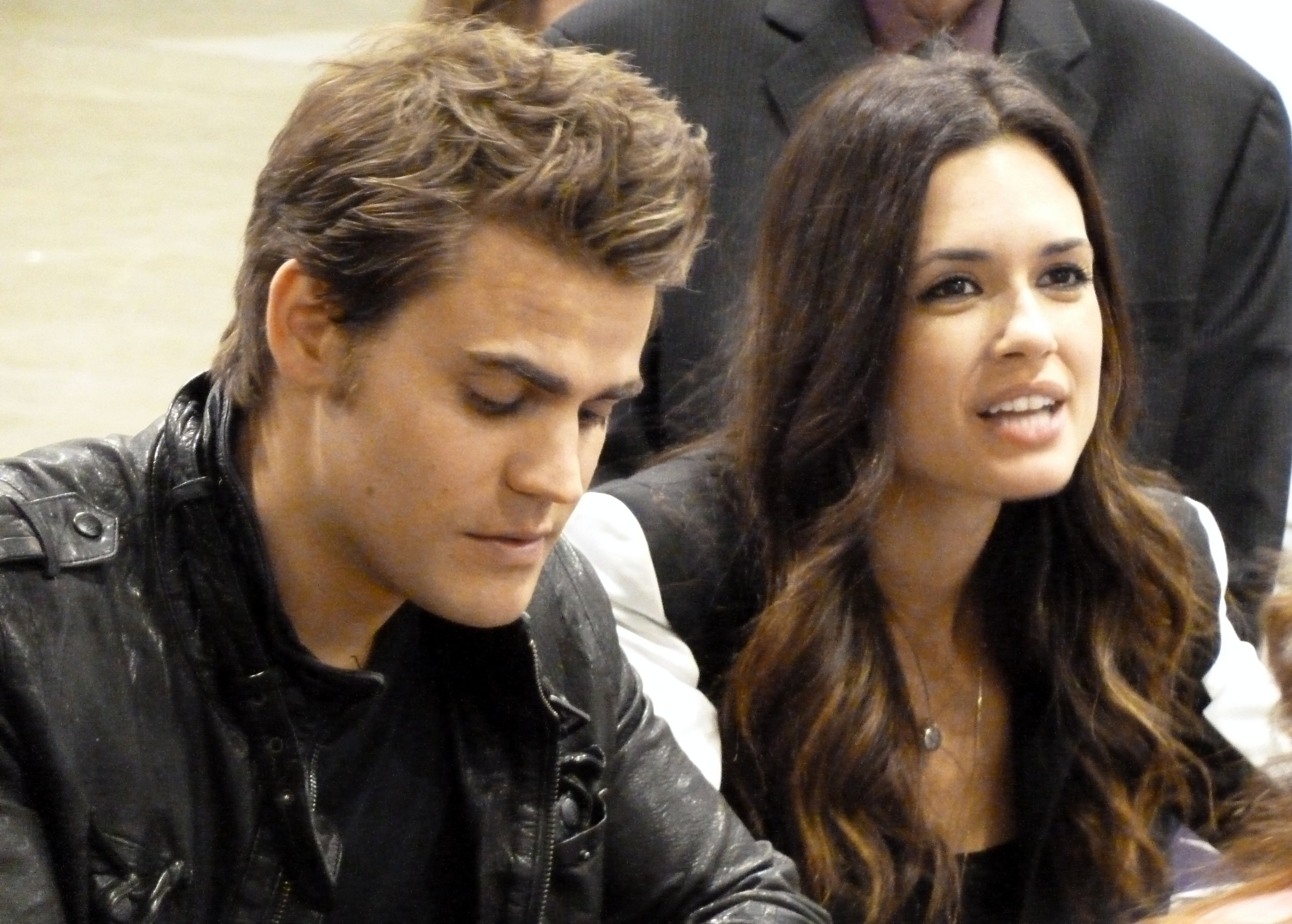
Wesley and Torrey DeVitto at Wizard World Toronto in 2012

Wesley met and began dating Torrey DeVitto in 2007 when they acted together in Killer Movie. They married in a private ceremony in New York City in April 2011. In July 2013, it was reported that they had filed for divorce. The divorce was finalized in December 2013.

He lived in Atlanta, Georgia, while filming The Vampire Diaries and the rest of the time with DeVitto in Los Angeles, California. Wesley sold his Los Angeles residence after his divorce from DeVitto.

Wesley was in a four-year relationship with Australian actress and The Vampire Diaries co-star Phoebe Tonkin, with the relationship ending in 2017.

In February 2019, he married Ines de Ramon. They separated in 2022 and their divorce was finalized in February 2024.

Wesley married model Natalie Kuckenburg in July 2026.

He is an ethical vegan who advocates for animal rights.

== Awards and nominations ==
Year	Award	Category	Work	Result	Ref.
2010	Young Hollywood Awards	Cast To Watch (with Ian Somerhalder and Nina Dobrev)	The Vampire Diaries	Won	
2010	Teen Choice Awards	Breakout Star Male	The Vampire Diaries	Won	
2010	Teen Choice Awards	Actor Fantasy/Sci-Fi	The Vampire Diaries	Won	
2011	Teen Choice Awards	Actor Fantasy/Sci-Fi	The Vampire Diaries	Nominated	
2011	Teen Choice Awards	Choice Vampire	The Vampire Diaries	Nominated	
2012	Teen Choice Awards	Actor Fantasy/Sci-Fi	The Vampire Diaries	Nominated	
2013	Teen Choice Awards	Actor Fantasy/Sci-Fi	The Vampire Diaries	Nominated	
2013	People's Choice Awards	Favorite Dramatic TV Actor	The Vampire Diaries	Nominated	
2014	Teen Choice Awards	Actor Fantasy/Sci-Fi	The Vampire Diaries	Nominated	
2014	Teen Choice Awards	TV Villain	The Vampire Diaries	Nominated	
2014	Young Hollywood Awards	Best Threesome (with Ian Somerhalder and Nina Dobrev)	The Vampire Diaries	Won	
2014	Northeast Film Festival	Best Supporting Actor in a Feature	Before I Disappear	Nominated	
2015	People's Choice Awards	Actor Fantasy/Sci-Fi	The Vampire Diaries	Nominated	
2015	Teen Choice Awards	Actor Fantasy/Sci-Fi	The Vampire Diaries	Nominated	
2015	Teen Choice Awards	Choice TV: Liplock (with Candice Accola)	The Vampire Diaries	Nominated	
2016	Teen Choice Awards	Actor Fantasy/Sci-Fi	The Vampire Diaries	Nominated	
2016	Teen Choice Awards	Choice TV: Liplock (with Candice King)	The Vampire Diaries	Nominated	
2024	Saturn Awards	Best Guest Star in a Television Series	Star Trek: Strange New Worlds	Won	
2026	Saturn Awards	Best Guest Star in a Television Series	Star Trek: Strange New Worlds	Nominated	
