= Sasha Pieterse =

American actress (born 1996)

- Pieterse in 2025
- Born: February 17, 1996 (age 30); Johannesburg, Gauteng, South Africa
- Citizenship: South Africa (1996–present); United States (2001–present)
- Occupations: Actress; singer; producer; businesswoman
- Years active: 2000–present
- Spouse: Hudson Sheaffer (m. 2018)
- Children: 1
- Musical career
- Genres: Country; southern rock
- Instrument: Vocals
- Label: Dan Franklin Music

Sasha Pieterse Sheaffer (/ˈpiːtərsə/; born February 17, 1996) is an American actress and singer. She is known for portraying Alison DiLaurentis in the Freeform series Pretty Little Liars (2010–2017), and its spin-off Pretty Little Liars: The Perfectionists (2019), in which she achieved global stardom and critical acclaim.

After early recognition for her roles as Buffy Davis in Family Affair (2002–2003) and as Marissa Electricidad / Ice Princess in the film The Adventures of Sharkboy and Lavagirl (2005), Pieterse played minor roles in various other films and series. She later rose to prominence with her role in Pretty Little Liars. Upon the success of Pretty Little Liars, Pieterse starred in films such as Disney Channel's Geek Charming (2011), teen comedy G.B.F (2013), indie film Burning Bodhi (2015), drama films Coin Heist (2017) and The Honor List (2018), and the psychological thriller film The Image of You (2024).

Pieterse participated in the 25th season of Dancing with the Stars (2017). In addition to acting, Pieterse has ventured into music and modeling. She served as a judge in Beat Bobby Flay and Sugar Rush Christmas (both 2020).

== Early life ==
Sasha Pieterse Sheaffer was born on February 17, 1996, in Johannesburg, South Africa, to Sean and Zizi. Pieterse's family is of Afrikaner descent and moved to the United States in 2001. She was raised in Las Vegas before moving to Los Angeles. She became accustomed to a career in entertainment at an early age, as her parents were a professional acrobatic dance team who performed internationally. Pieterse was homeschooled and graduated when she was 14 years old.

== Career ==
=== Modeling ===
At four years old, Pieterse began modeling and appearing in commercials. She appeared in an advertisement for Wenner Bread Products at five years old, and later appeared on a national billboard for hair salon franchise SuperCuts and modeled for Macy's Passport fashion show. Pieterse appeared in numerous magazines, including on the covers of BELLO's "Young Hollywood" issue (December 2014), TeenProm (2015 issue), Seventeen (August 2016), Social Life (August 2019).

=== Film and television ===
At the age of six, Pieterse got her start in television, co-starring in 2002 as Buffy on The WB's remake of the CBS sitcom Family Affair. She guest starred in the Stargate SG-1 episode "Grace" with Amanda Tapping as a little girl named Grace. In 2005, she appeared on an episode of House titled "Autopsy", portraying Andie, a young girl with terminal cancer. That same year, she made her film debut in The Adventures of Sharkboy and Lavagirl in 3-D as Marissa, the Ice Princess, and also appeared as Millie Rose for two episodes of the short-lived TNT series Wanted, alongside her former Family Affair co-star, Gary Cole.

Pieterse appeared in the 2007 film Good Luck Chuck, playing a young goth girl who places a curse on the titular character. She played the younger version of Sarah Michelle Gellar's character in the 2007 film The Air I Breathe, along with such co-stars as Kevin Bacon, Forest Whitaker, and Emile Hirsch. She also played a leading character in the Hallmark original film Claire, also released in 2007.

Pieterse was 13 years old in late 2009, when she was cast in the Freeform teen drama television series Pretty Little Liars (2010–2017) as Alison DiLaurentis, the former "queen bee" of her high school clique. She had a regular role in the series from the first four seasons, until later became a main role in the fifth season, with one of the five girls. Since its debut, the series has received mixed reviews from television critics, but remained a success for Freeform, garnering a large fandom. Pieterse reprised her role as Alison, in the spin-off series titled Pretty Little Liars: The Perfectionists on Freeform in 2019. On Pretty Little Liars: The Perfectionists, she portrayed the grown-up version of Alison who is working as a teaching assistant at Beacon Heights University.

Other roles Pieterse has had include a 2009 appearance in Without a Trace, and a recurring role as Amanda Strazzulla, an abandoned daughter, in Heroes. In 2011, she appeared as Amy Loubalu in the Disney Channel Original Movie Geek Charming, and also as a teenage girl in the film X-Men: First Class. Later, Pieterse appeared in the film G.B.F. and in an episode of Hawaii Five-0 as a terrorist pupil named Dawn Hatfield. Pieterse played Japonica Fenway in the film Inherent Vice (2014), based on the novel of the same name by Thomas Pynchon. In September 2017, Pieterse was announced as one of the celebrities to compete on the 25th season of Dancing with the Stars. She was paired with professional dancer Gleb Savchenko. They were the fourth couple eliminated, on October 16, 2017, finishing in 10th place.

On August 16, 2021, Deadline announced that Pieterse had been cast in Netflix's film adaptation of Annie Barrows’ New York Times bestselling book series Ivy + Bean alongside Jesse Tyler Ferguson, Jane Lynch and Nia Vardalos. In July 2023, Deadline Hollywood reported that Pieterse had been cast in psychological thriller film The Image of You (2024), starring in a dual roles of twin sisters of Anna and Zoe.

=== Music ===
Pieterse describes her music as "country with southern rock". Her debut single "This Country is Bad Ass" was released on April 12, 2013. Pieterse described the patriotism behind the song: "I just love this country so much and I would never have been able to be where I am if I wasn't in America, so we decided to come up with this [track]." Her second single, "R.P.M", was released on June 13, 2013.

Pieterse's third single, "I Can't Fix You", was released on July 12, 2013. On December 10, 2013, she released her fourth single "No", an upbeat track about "standing strong in your convictions" and saying no when an unfaithful, lying ex-boyfriend asks for a second chance.

=== Other ventures ===
Pieterse's cookbook Sasha in Good Taste: Recipes for Bites, Feasts, Sips & Celebrations was published by Dey Street Books, an imprint of HarperCollins on October 8, 2019. In the book Pieterse shares cooking and baking recipes, tips for inexpensive party planning, do it yourself projects and ideas for desserts. San Francisco Book Review wrote that the book is "full of good ideas".

Pieterse has a lifestyle website called "Sasha in Good Taste".

== Philanthropy ==
In June 2019, Pieterse and her husband worked together with Habitat for Humanity to help build houses in New Orleans.

== Personal life ==
On December 22, 2015, Pieterse became engaged to her long-term partner Hudson Sheaffer. They were married on May 27, 2018, at Castle Leslie in Glaslough, Ireland. Their first child, a son, was born in November 2020. As of 2022, the family resides in Nashville, Tennessee.

At the start of season 25 of Dancing with the Stars, Pieterse revealed that she was diagnosed with polyendocrine metabolic ovarian syndrome (PMOS), which causes symptoms such as irregular periods and weight gain.

Pieterse speaks Afrikaans, English, and French.

== Filmography ==
=== Film ===
Year	Title	Role	Notes
2005	The Adventures of Sharkboy and Lavagirl in 3-D	Marissa Electricidad / Ice Princess	
2007	The Air I Breathe	Young Sorrow	
2007	Good Luck Chuck	Young Anisha Carpenter	
2011	X-Men: First Class	Teenage girl	Cameo
2013	G.B.F.	Fawcett Brooks	
2014	Inherent Vice	Japonica Fenway	
2015	Burning Bodhi	Aria	
2017	Coin Heist	Dakota Cunningham	
2018	The Honor List	Isabella Walker	
2022	Ivy + Bean: The Ghost That Had to Go	Ms. Aruba-Tate	
2022	Ivy + Bean: Doomed to Dance	Ms. Aruba-Tate	
2024	The Image of You	Anna / Zoe	

=== Television ===
Year	Title	Role	Notes
2002–2003	Family Affair	Buffy Davis	Main role
2004	Stargate SG-1	Grace	Episode: "Grace"
2005	Wanted	Millie Rose	2 episodes
2005	House	Andie	Episode: "Autopsy"
2007	Claire	Maggie Bannion	Television film
2007	CSI: Miami	Beth Buckley	Episode: "Stand Your Ground"
2009	Without a Trace	Daphne Stevens	Episode: "Wanted"
2009–2010	Heroes	Amanda Strazzulla	Recurring role (season 4)
2009	Heroes: Slow Burn	Amanda Strazzulla	Web series; recurring role
2010–2017	Pretty Little Liars	Alison DiLaurentis	Main role
2011	Medium	Marie DuBois (age 14)	Episode: "Me Without You"
2011	Geek Charming	Amy Loubalu	Television film
2014	Hawaii Five-0	Dawn Hatfield	Episode: "Pe'epe'e Kanaka"
2016	Sing It!	Destiny Wood	Episode: "Destiny Is Calling!"
2017	Dancing with the Stars	Herself	Contestant (season 25)
2019	Pretty Little Liars: The Perfectionists	Alison DiLaurentis	Main role
2019	Epic Night	Shook	Web series; 2 episodes
2020	Beat Bobby Flay	Herself	Celebrity judge; episode: "Pretty Little Fryer"
2020	Sugar Rush Christmas	Herself	Guest judge; episode: "North Pole"
2024	A Carpenter Christmas Romance	Andrea Metcalf	Lifetime television film; also executive producer

=== Music videos ===
Year	Title	Artist	Role	Notes	Ref.
2013	"Rewind"	Skye Stevens	Love Interest		
2013	"R.P.M."	Sasha Pieterse	Reckless Driver Girl	Also executive producer	
2014	"Hey! (The Last Party Ever)"	The New Average	Girl		
2026	"Get In Girl"	Meghan Trainor	Friend		

== Awards and nominations ==
Year	Association	Category	Work	Result	Ref.
2003	Young Artist Awards	Best Performance in a TV Series (Comedy or Drama) – Young Actress Age Ten or Younger	Family Affair	Won	
2003	Young Artist Awards	Best Ensemble in a TV Series (Comedy or Drama) (shared with Caitlin Wachs and Jimmy "Jax" Pinchak)	Family Affair	Nominated	
2011	ShoWest Awards	Breakthrough Performer of the Year	Pretty Little Liars	Nominated	
2014	Teen Choice Awards	Choice TV Female Breakout Star	Pretty Little Liars	Won	
2015	Independent Spirit Awards	Robert Altman Award (shared with director, casting director and cast)	Inherent Vice	Won	
2015	MTV Fandom Awards	Ship of the Year (shared with Shay Mitchell)	Pretty Little Liars	Nominated	
2015	Teen Choice Awards	Choice TV: Scene Stealer	Pretty Little Liars	Nominated	
2016	Teen Choice Awards	Choice TV: Scene Stealer	Pretty Little Liars	Won	
2017	Teen Choice Awards	Choice TV Actress: Drama	Pretty Little Liars	Nominated	
2017	Teen Choice Awards	Choice TV Ship (shared with Shay Mitchell)	Pretty Little Liars	Nominated	

== Bibliography ==
- Pieterse, Sasha (2019). Sasha in Good Taste: Recipes for Bites, Feasts, Sips & Celebrations. Dey Street Books.
