= The Russell Girl =

- Genre: Drama
- Written by: Jill Blotevogel
- Directed by: Jeff Bleckner
- Starring: Amber Tamblyn; Mary Elizabeth Mastrantonio; Jennifer Ehle; Henry Czerny
- Music by: Jeff Beal
- Country of origin: United States
- Original language: English

Production
- Executive producer: Brent Shields
- Producer: Andy Gottlieb
- Production location: Toronto
- Cinematography: Charles Minsky
- Editor: Geoffrey Rowland
- Running time: 120 minutes
- Production company: Hallmark Hall of Fame Productions

Original release
- Network: CBS
- Release: January 27, 2008

The Russell Girl is a 2008 American drama television film directed by Jeff Bleckner and written by Jill Blotevogel. It stars Amber Tamblyn as a young medical student who must come to terms with her past. Mary Elizabeth Mastrantonio, Jennifer Ehle, and Henry Czerny co-star. The film premiered on CBS on January 27, 2008, as part of the Hallmark Hall of Fame anthology series.

== Plot ==
Sarah Russell is a young woman who has recently discovered that she has leukemia right before she also discovers that she has been accepted to Northwestern University's medical program. She decides to put her school on hold so she can travel back home to tell her parents Gayle and Phil about her recent diagnosis. However at the same time Sarah is convinced that this is retribution for a tragic accident that involved her neighbor Lorainne's baby.

== Cast ==
- Amber Tamblyn as Sarah Russell
- Mary Elizabeth Mastrantonio as Gayle Russell
- Jennifer Ehle as Lorainne Morrissey
- Henry Czerny as Howard Morrisey
- Paul Wesley as Evan Carroll
- Tim DeKay as Phil Russell
- Daniel Clark as Daniel Russell
- Ben Lewis as Jon Morrissey
- Max Morrow as Rick Morrissey
- Richard Leacock as Dr. Gordon
- Richard Fitzpatrick as Ray
- Rebecca Dreiling as Karaoke Girl
- Max MacBride as Young Jon
- William Cuddy as Young Rick
- Paula Barrett as Fran

== Production ==
Filming took place in Toronto.

== Reception ==
Critical reception has been mixed. Variety's Laura Fries wrote "On paper, writer Jill Blotevogel’s script is standard TV melodrama, but Tamblyn’s deeply expressive performance, along with that of Tony-winner Ehle, creates believably heart-wrenching emotions. “The Russell Girl” proves Tamblyn can carry a film. Ehle, bearing an uncanny resemblance to Meryl Streep, is as good onscreen as onstage. She went on to offer "Supporting performances are well done and key to the overall story, especially the father figures eloquently portrayed by DeKay and Henry Czerny. Paul Wesley as Evan, Sarah’s old flame, is a little too good to be true but is a charismatic match to Tamblyn’s Sarah." Post Gazette noted the film's focus on the difficulties of reconciliation and forgiveness, and praised the film's acting. Noted Tamblyn regarding the title character: "There is something lovely about her, that in the face of something terrifying, she has to go back and see things that were never faced before."
