= DanceLife =

Television series

- Also known as: J.Lo's DanceLife; Dancelife: J.Lo Project
- Created by: Jennifer Lopez; Maurissa Tancharoen; Kevin Tancharoen
- Starring: Jennifer Lopez; Celestina Aladekoba; Blake McGrath; Jersey Maniscalco; Kenny Wormald; Nolan Padilla; Staci Flood
- Opening theme: "Find A New Way" by Young Love
- Country of origin: United States
- No. of seasons: 1
- No. of episodes: 8

Production
- Executive producer: Jennifer Lopez
- Running time: 30 minutes
- Production companies: Nuyorican Productions; MTV Series Entertainment

Original release
- Network: MTV
- Release: January 15 – March 5, 2007

DanceLife is a 2007 dance-oriented reality show, featuring and produced by Jennifer Lopez. The series follows the lives of seven dancers trying to break into the world of professional dance and trying to "make it" in Hollywood.

DanceLife premiered on January 15, 2007, and concluded its first season on March 5, 2007. The show has had guest appearances from Ashlee Simpson, Nelly Furtado, Mary J. Blige, Omarion, The Pussycat Dolls, and Ashley Roberts.

== Cast ==
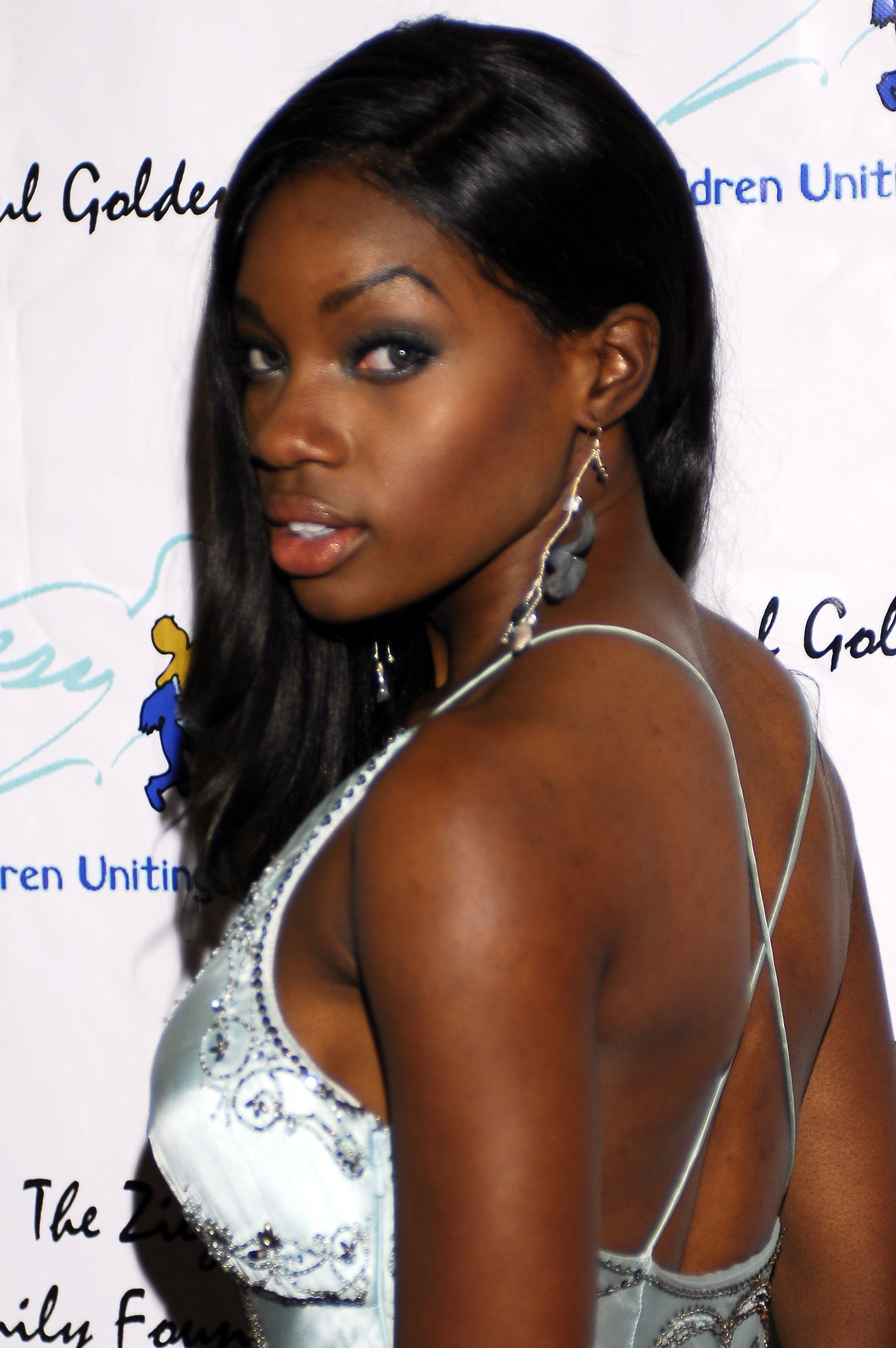
Celestina at the 79th Annual Academy Awards Children Uniting Nations/Billboard after-party

- Blake McGrath: the Canadian, who was a third-place male in the first season of So You Think You Can Dance, is a sought after dancer in Hollywood with a long list of credits including: Madonna, Janet Jackson, and Britney Spears. Momentarily seen in Rent and doing commercials for iPod and GAP, McGrath is now a judge and choreographer on So You Think You Can Dance Canada.
- Staci Flood: the former Pussycat Dolls member who has been dancing professionally for over a decade has performed with Britney Spears, Justin Timberlake, and Christina Aguilera. Her film credits include Collateral, and Charlie's Angels: Full Throttle. Her career ambitions include singing, with a proposed CD release.
- Michelle "Jersey" Maniscalco: a former Philadelphia Eagles cheerleader and Las Vegas showgirl from New Jersey, has trained in everything from acrobatics to ballet, and is hoping that dance will be her ticket to fame and her way out of debt. Her nickname is "Jersey". She came second in Wade Robson's MTV show Wade Robson Project, but lost to Tyler Banks.
- Kenny Wormald: a former baseball player from Boston, he has danced in videos with Jennifer Lopez, Madonna, Nelly Furtado, Mariah Carey and Prince. He has also starred in You Got Served and played one of the lead roles in Center Stage: Turn It Up. In 2009, he toured with The Pussycat Dolls on the Doll Domination Tour. In 2011, Wormald played Ren McCormack in the re-make of Footloose.
- Nolan Padilla: after teaching himself how to dance by watching Janet Jackson videos, he moved to Los Angeles from Wyoming with no car, no connections, no money and a dark past, and is hoping his hard work and talent will lead him to a big break and a big paycheck, but for the moment he's not giving up his day job. In episode 7, "Double Booked", in a conversation with his mother, Nolan talked about how his relationship with his father has become strained due to his coming out. During episode 8, "The Last Dance", Padilla and his father reconcile when Padilla's father attends his performance at New York's Gay Pride Celebration. He also was on tour with Miley Cyrus on her WonderWorld tour in 2009.
- Celestina Aladekoba: With almost no professional training, Aladekoba, who is originally from Nigeria, has become a music video "It Girl" after starring in Prince's "Black Sweat" video.

== Episodes ==
No.	Title	Original release date
1	"Auditions"	January 15, 2007
The competition level at the audition is high as the choreographers begin to warm up hopeful candidates. J-Lo encourages the dancers to push their moves to the limits, but to refrain from hurting themselves. After several cuts, many hours have passed, and the candidates have diminished considerably. J-Lo is eventually able to narrow her male search down to two dancers: Kenny, a new dancer imported to L.A. from Boston, and Blake a cocky more established dancer. Later on Kenny meets up with his roommate Nick at the park with some good and bad news. The bad news is that he's not going to be able to make any of their upcoming football games for a while. The good news is, however, that he got the call from J-Lo's people and he has been booked for her upcoming project.
2	"Scraping By"	January 22, 2007
Nolan receives an eviction notice from his landlord. On top of struggling to keep his head above water, Nolan is just reentering the competitive world of professional dance after a hiatus caused by drug addiction. Worried that he's not going to make it, Nolan puts in extra effort in when he auditions for a spot on the upcoming Mary J. Blige tour. Things are not going smoothly for Blake either. With the release party for his new DVD just around the corner, the pressure is on for him to tie up several minor details before the event. Blake's frustrations reach an unexpected peak when he gets a call from his agent informing him that the DVDs may not be ready in time for the party on top of word from Kenny that he is going to have to cancel at the last second.
3	"New York Minute"	January 29, 2007
Staci and Jersey both audition for the same gig with GAP, but Staci ends up taking the part. Meanwhile, Kenny loses the male role in the GAP gig to Blake, but ends up getting hired to dance for Nelly Furtado on Saturday Night Live.
4	"Balancing Act"	February 5, 2007
Celestina struggles to juggle work and her boyfriend. Meanwhile, she and Jersey end up getting a gig with Ashlee Simpson.
5	"Waiting on Love"	February 12, 2007
Blake hosts a premiere party for his GAP commercial. Meanwhile, Kenny meets up with his girlfriend Ashley Roberts from The Pussycat Dolls.
6	"Making the Video"	February 19, 2007
Staci has had a good run in the world of dance but now wants to pursue her ultimate goal of becoming a singer. Putting dancing on hold, she gets some help from Blake, Kenny and Celestina to get the next phase in her life up and going. Together, the group create a music video to go along with Staci's new single.
7	"Double Booked"	February 26, 2007
A frustrated Nolan deals with more downs than ups. Between doing some apartment hunting and having it out with Blake, Nolan reveals to his mom that he's gay. His mom takes it well, but it is hinted that the issue is a bit more stressful with Nolan's father. Jersey auditions for a national commercial for the shoe company Skechers, and for an Omarion music video. She's thrilled when she is selected for both jobs, but her agent tells her that she will have to choose only one, as both jobs take place on the same day. Jersey selects the Skechers commercial. Omarion is shown at the music video shoot, and when he receives the news, calls her actions "unprofessional". Jersey's car breaks down, and Blake accompanies her to a Ford dealership where she buys a new car.
8	"The Last Dance"	March 2, 2007
Nolan and Kenny get to dance for Jennifer Lopez during one of her concerts. They are flown to New York, and must learn three dances in two days. Rehearsals go well, and Nolan decides to phone his father and invite him to the concert—a final performance for a Gay Pride event. The concert concludes, and Nolan finds his father in the crowd. After returning to LA, Nolan and Blake make nice after their past argument—maybe the start of a friendship.
