= List of awards and nominations received by Jim Broadbent =

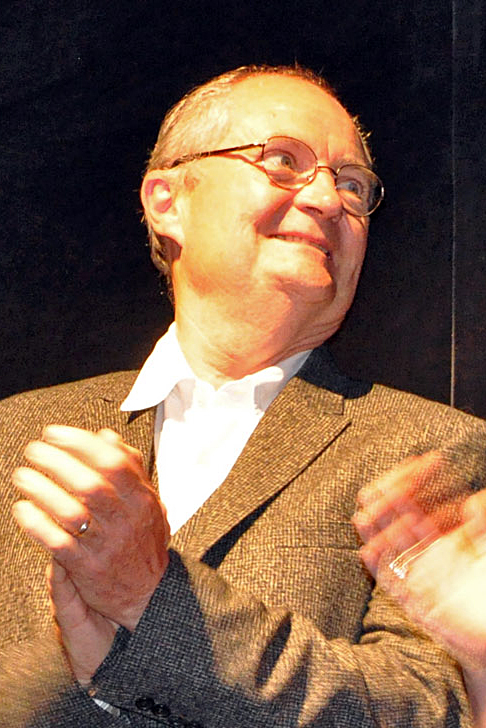
Broadbent at the 2010 Toronto International Film Festival

Jim Broadbent is an English actor known for his work in film and television.

Broadbent received his Academy Award for Best Supporting Actor for his performance in Richard Eyre's Iris (2001) starring alongside Judi Dench. That same year, he won his British Academy Film Award for his performance in Baz Luhrmann's Moulin Rouge! (2001). In 2007, he received a British Academy Television Award for his work in Tom Hooper's television film, Longford (2007). He has received two Golden Globe Awards for his performances in Iris (2001) and Longford (2007).

== Major awards ==
=== Academy Awards ===
Year	Category	Nominated work	Result	Ref.
2002	Best Supporting Actor	Iris	Won	

=== BAFTA Awards ===
Year	Category	Nominated work	Result	Ref.
British Academy Film Awards
2000	Best Actor in a Leading Role	Topsy-Turvy	Nominated	
2002	Best Actor in a Leading Role	Iris	Nominated	
2002	Best Actor in a Supporting Role	Moulin Rouge!	Won	
2012	Best Actor in a Supporting Role	The Iron Lady	Nominated	
British Academy Television Awards
2004	Best Actor - Television	The Young Visiters	Nominated	
2007	Best Actor - Television	Longford	Won	
2011	Best Actor - Television	Any Human Heart	Nominated	

=== Emmy Awards ===
Year	Category	Nominated work	Result	Ref.
Primetime Emmy Awards
2002	Outstanding Supporting Actor in a Limited Series or Movie	The Gathering Storm	Nominated	
2007	Outstanding Lead Actor in a Limited Series or Movie	Longford	Nominated	
International Emmy Awards
2007	Best Actor	The Street	Won	

=== Golden Globe Awards ===
Year	Category	Nominated work	Result	Ref.
2001	Best Supporting Actor – Motion Picture	Iris	Won	
2002	Best Supporting Actor – Television Film	The Gathering Storm	Nominated	
2007	Best Actor – Miniseries or Television Film	Longford	Won	

=== Grammy Award ===
Year	Category	Nominated work	Result	Ref.
2004	Best Spoken Word Album for Children	Winnie-the-Pooh	Nominated	

=== Screen Actors Guild Award ===
Year	Category	Nominated work	Result	Ref.
1999	Outstanding Cast in a Motion Picture	Little Voice	Nominated	
2002	Outstanding Cast in a Motion Picture	Moulin Rouge!	Nominated	
2002	Outstanding Actor in a Supporting Role	Iris	Nominated	
2018	Outstanding Ensemble in a Drama Series	Game of Thrones	Nominated	

== Critics awards ==
Year	Award	Category	Nominated work	Result
1999	Evening Standard British Film Awards	Best Actor	Topsy-Turvy	Won
1999	London Film Critics Circle	Best Actor	Topsy-Turvy	Won
1999	Venice International Film Festival	Volpi Cup for Best Actor	Topsy-Turvy	Won
1999	British Independent Film Award	Best Actor	Topsy-Turvy	Nominated
1999	Chicago Film Critics Association	Best Actor	Topsy-Turvy	Nominated
2001	Los Angeles Film Critics Association	Best Supporting Actor	Moulin Rouge!	Won
2001	National Board of Review	Best Supporting Actor	Moulin Rouge!	Won
2001	Los Angeles Film Critics Association	Best Supporting Actor	Iris	Won
2001	National Board of Review	Best Supporting Actor	Iris	Won
2001	Broadcast Film Critics Association	Best Supporting Actor	Iris	Nominated
2001	European Film Award	Best Actor	Iris	Nominated
2001	Phoenix Film Critics Society Award	Best Supporting Actor	Iris	Nominated
2002	National Board of Review	Best Cast	Nicholas Nickleby	Won
2006	International Emmy Award	Best Performance by an Actor	The Street	Won
2007	Broadcasting Press Guild Award	Best Actor	Longford	Won
2007	Monte Carlo TV Festival	Television Films – Best Actor	Longford	Nominated
2007	Royal Television Society Award	Best Actor – Male	Longford	Nominated
2007	Satellite Award	Best Actor - Miniseries or TV Film	Longford	Nominated
2007	British Independent Film Award	The Richard Harris Award		Won
2007	British Independent Film Award	Best Actor	And When Did You Last See Your Father?	Nominated
2007	London Film Critics Circle	Best Actor	And When Did You Last See Your Father?	Nominated
2009	British Independent Film Award	Best Supporting Actor	The Damned United	Nominated
2010	British Independent Film Award	Best Actor	Another Year	Nominated
2010	London Film Critics Circle	Best Actor	Another Year	Nominated
2010	San Diego Film Critics Society	Best Cast	Another Year	Nominated
2010	Royal Television Society Award	Best Actor – Male	Any Human Heart	Won
