= 59th Golden Globe Awards =

Film award ceremony in 2002

- Date: January 20, 2002
- Site: Beverly Hilton Hotel; Beverly Hills, Los Angeles, California

Highlights
- Best Film: Drama: A Beautiful Mind
- Best Film: Musical or Comedy: Moulin Rouge!
- Best Drama Series: Six Feet Under
- Best Musical or Comedy Series: Sex and the City
- Best Miniseries or Television movie: Band of Brothers
- Most awards: (4) A Beautiful Mind
- Most nominations: (6) A Beautiful Mind; Moulin Rouge!

Television coverage
- Network: NBC

The 59th Golden Globe Awards, honoring the best in film and television for 2001, were held on January 20, 2002. The nominations were announced on December 20, 2001.

== Winners and nominees ==
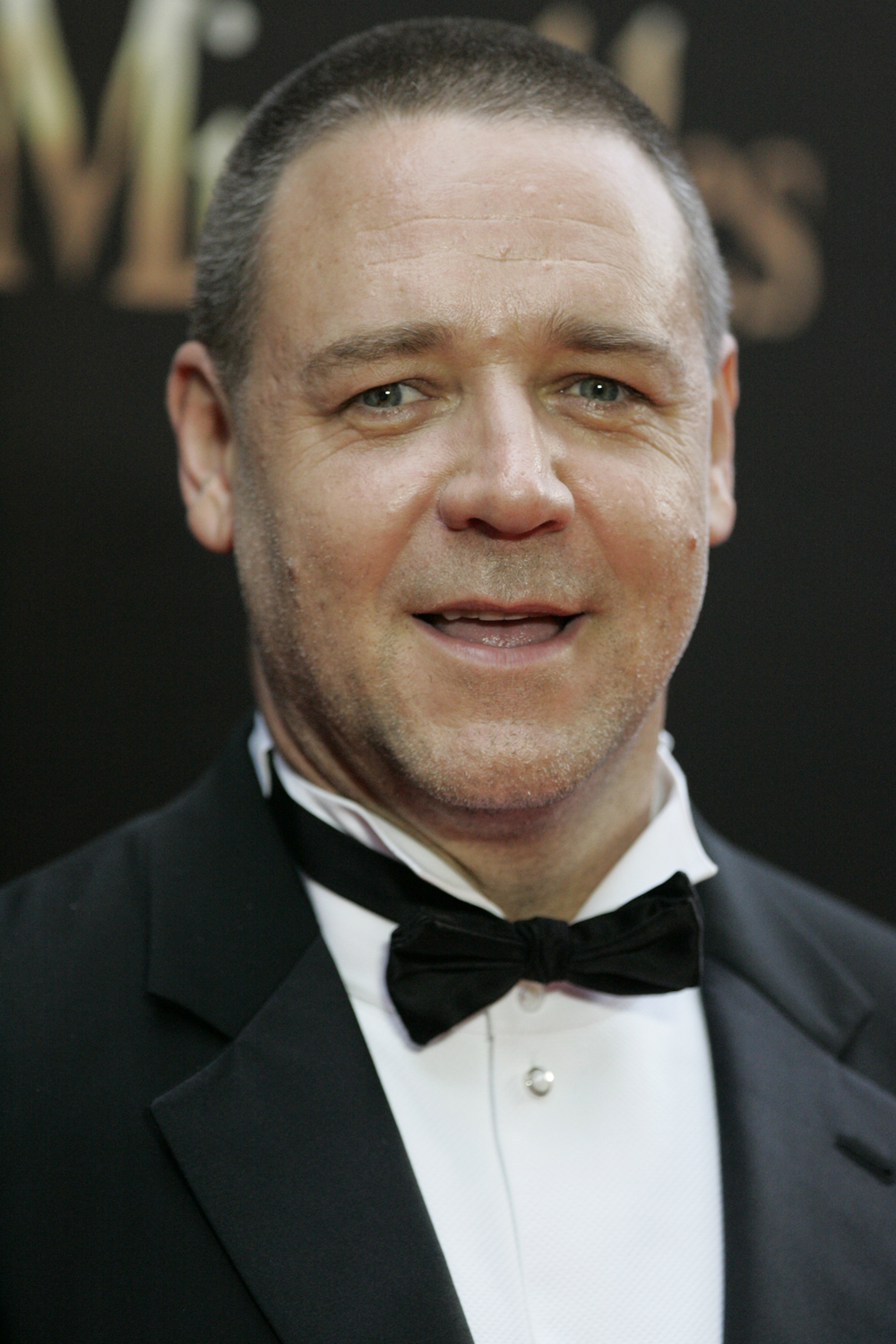
Russell Crowe, Best Actor in a Motion Picture – Drama winner

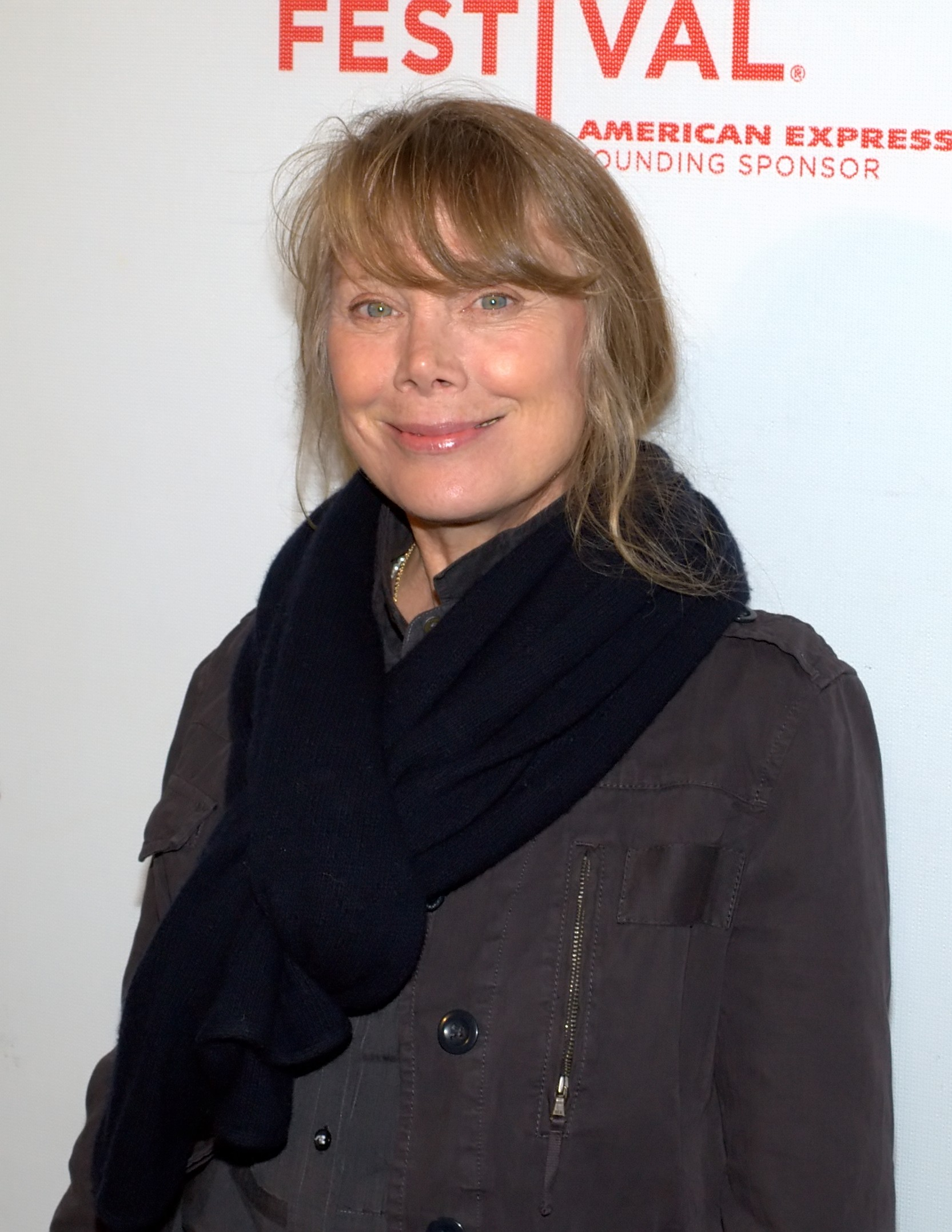
Sissy Spacek, Best Actress in a Motion Picture – Drama winner

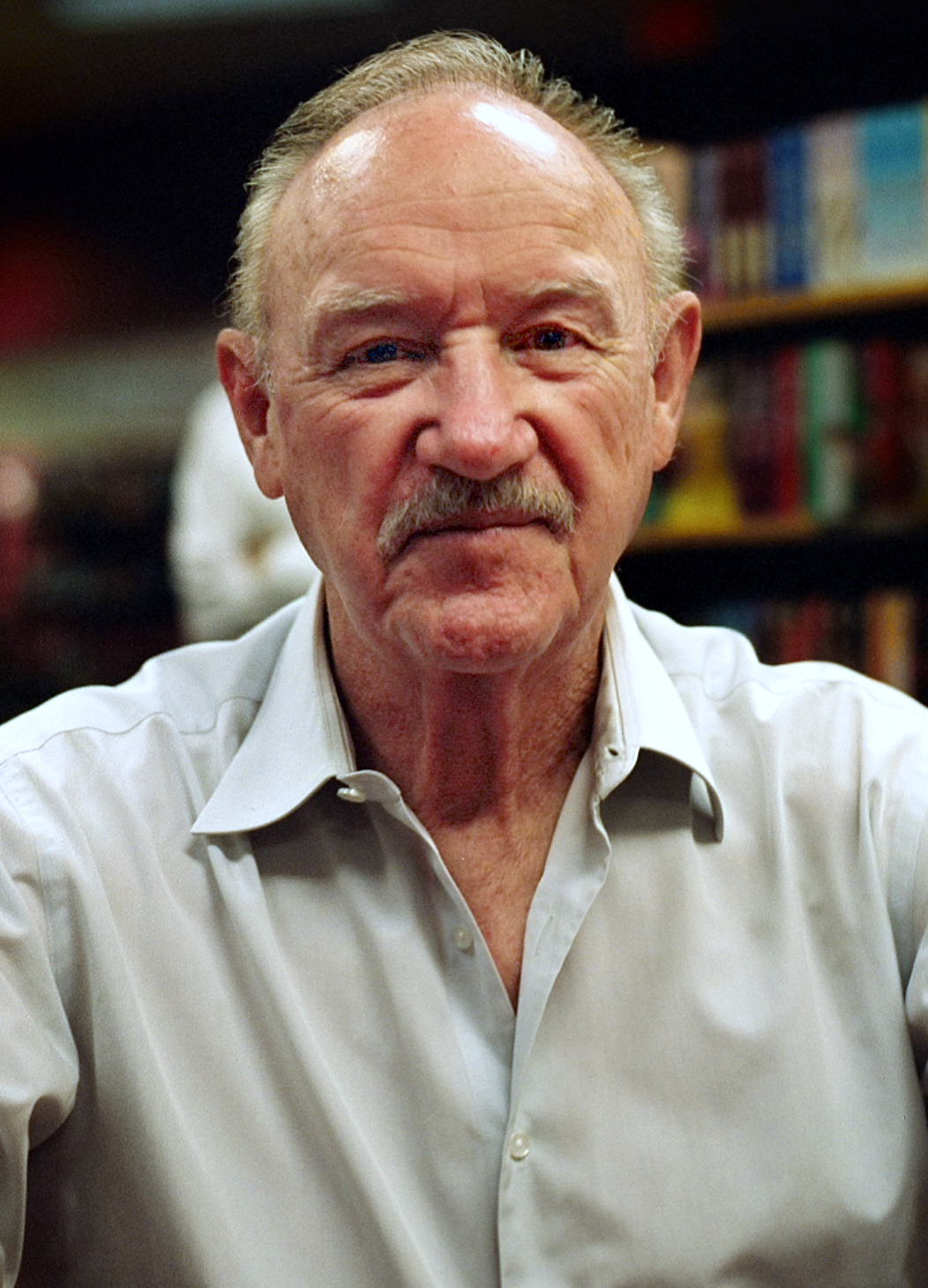
Gene Hackman, Best Actor in a Motion Picture – Musical or Comedy winner

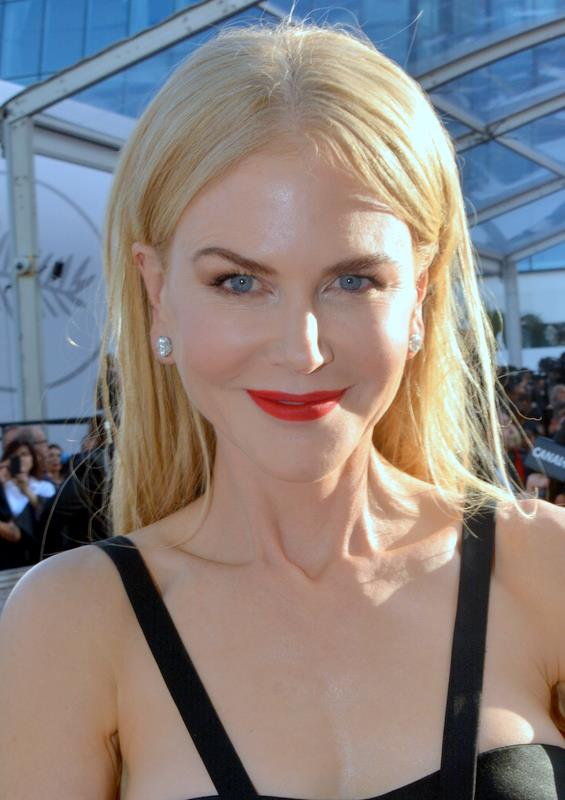
Nicole Kidman, Best Actress in a Motion Picture – Musical or Comedy winner

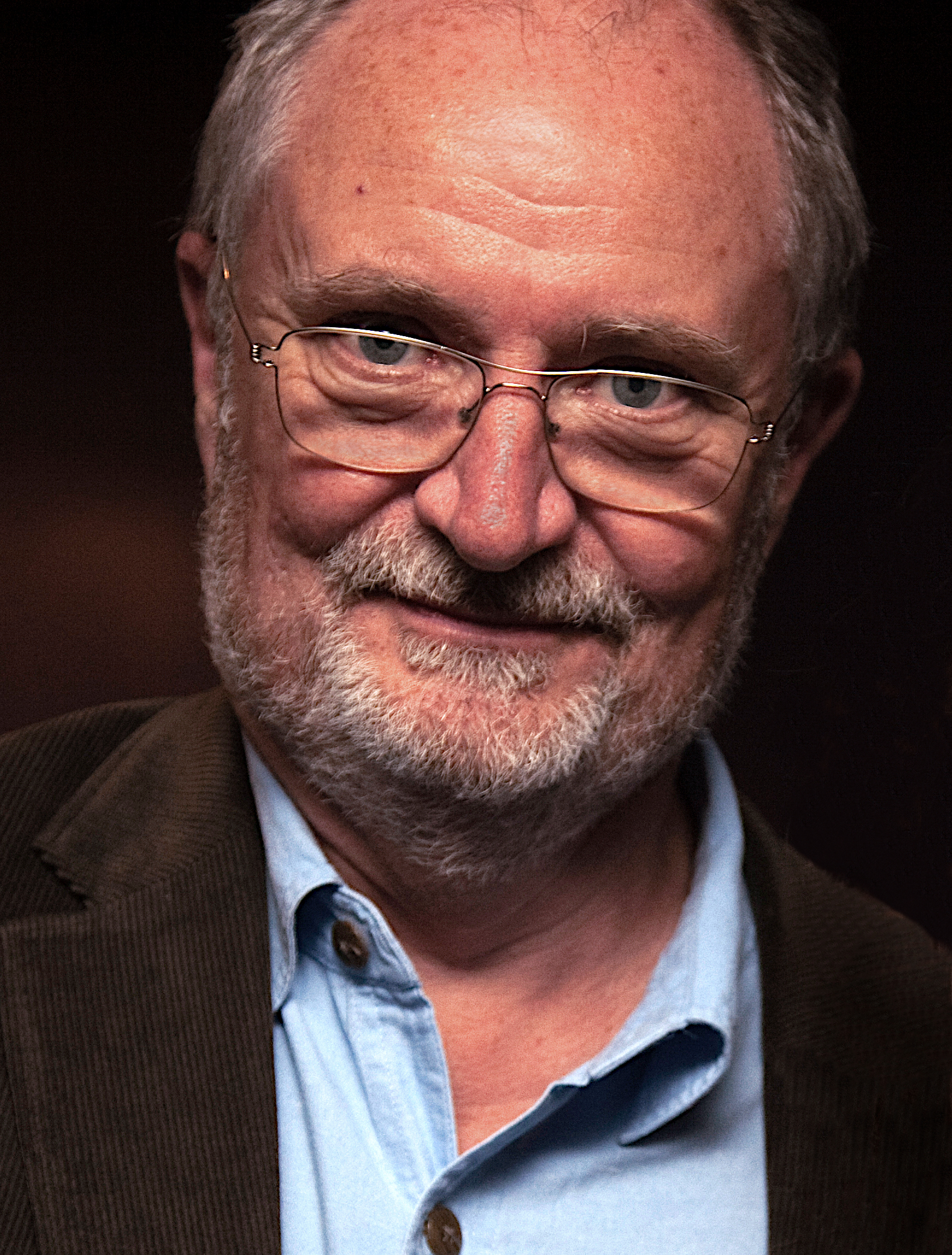
Jim Broadbent, Best Supporting Actor winner

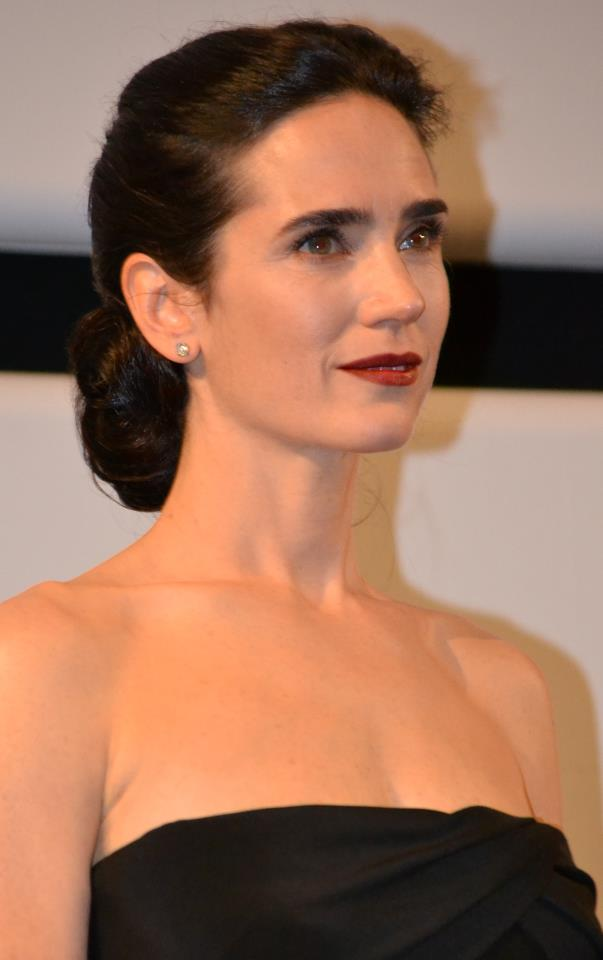
Jennifer Connelly, Best Supporting Actress winner

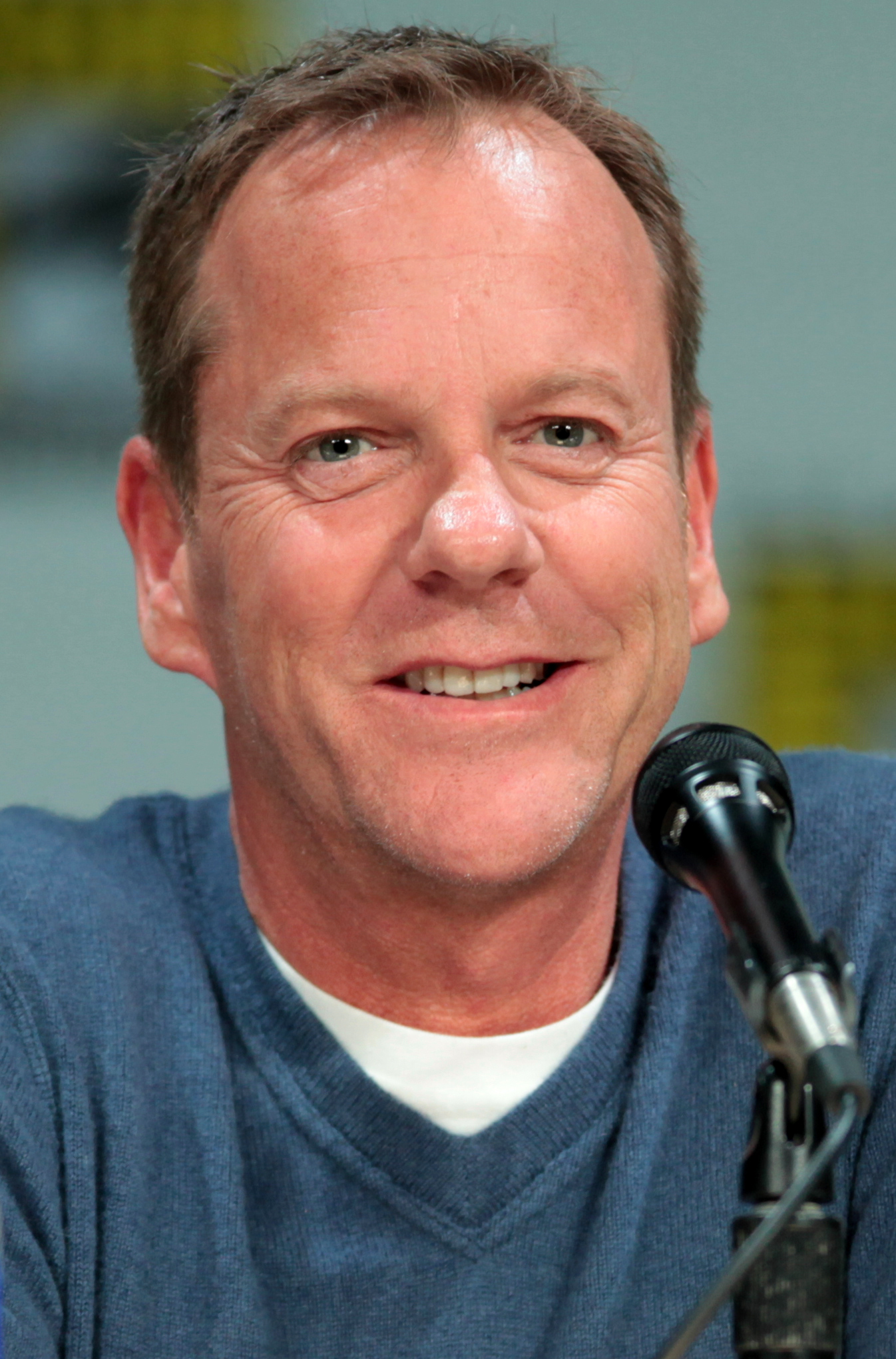
Kiefer Sutherland, Best Actor in a Television Series – Drama winner

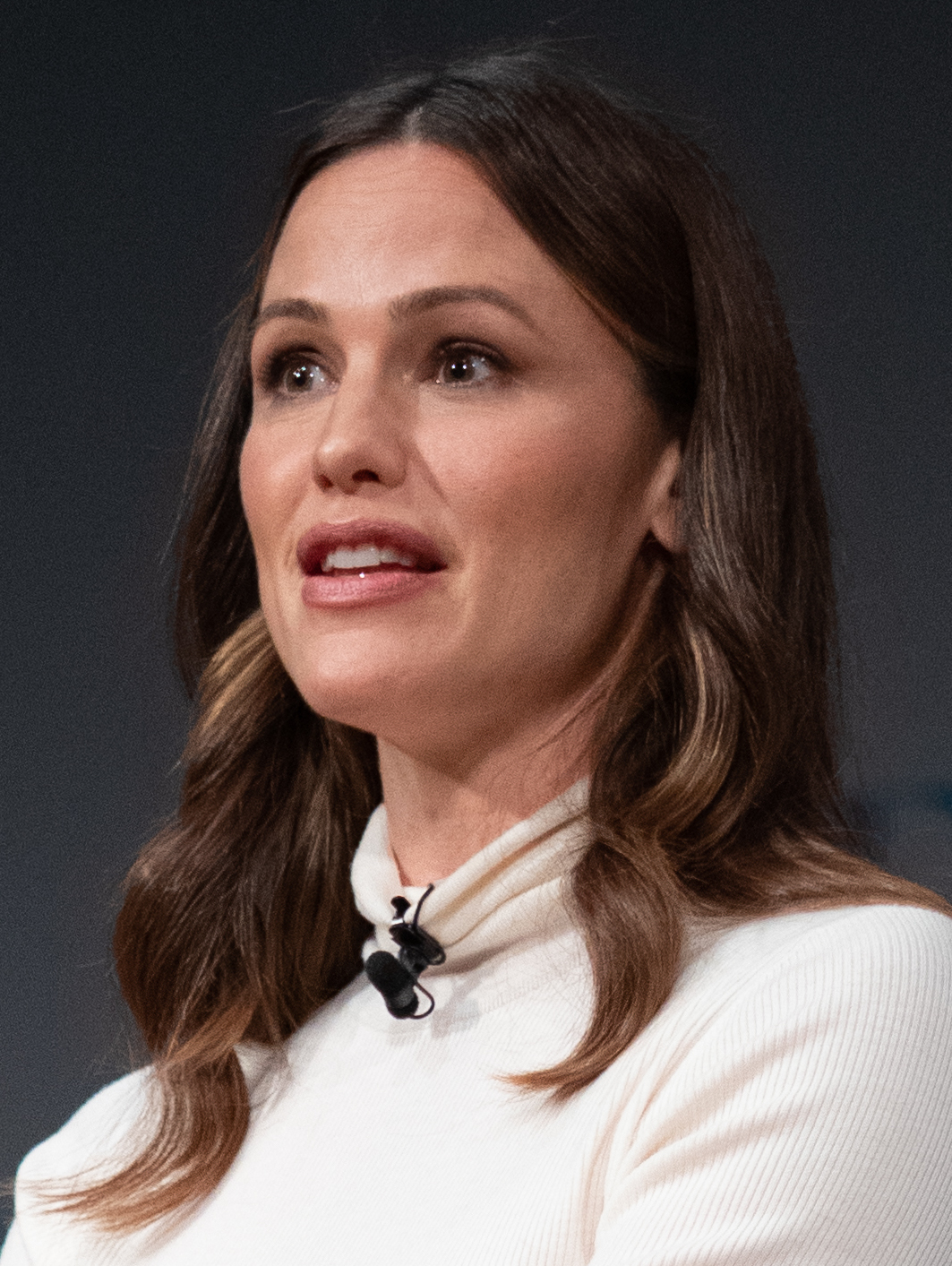
Jennifer Garner, Best Actress in a Television Series – Drama winner

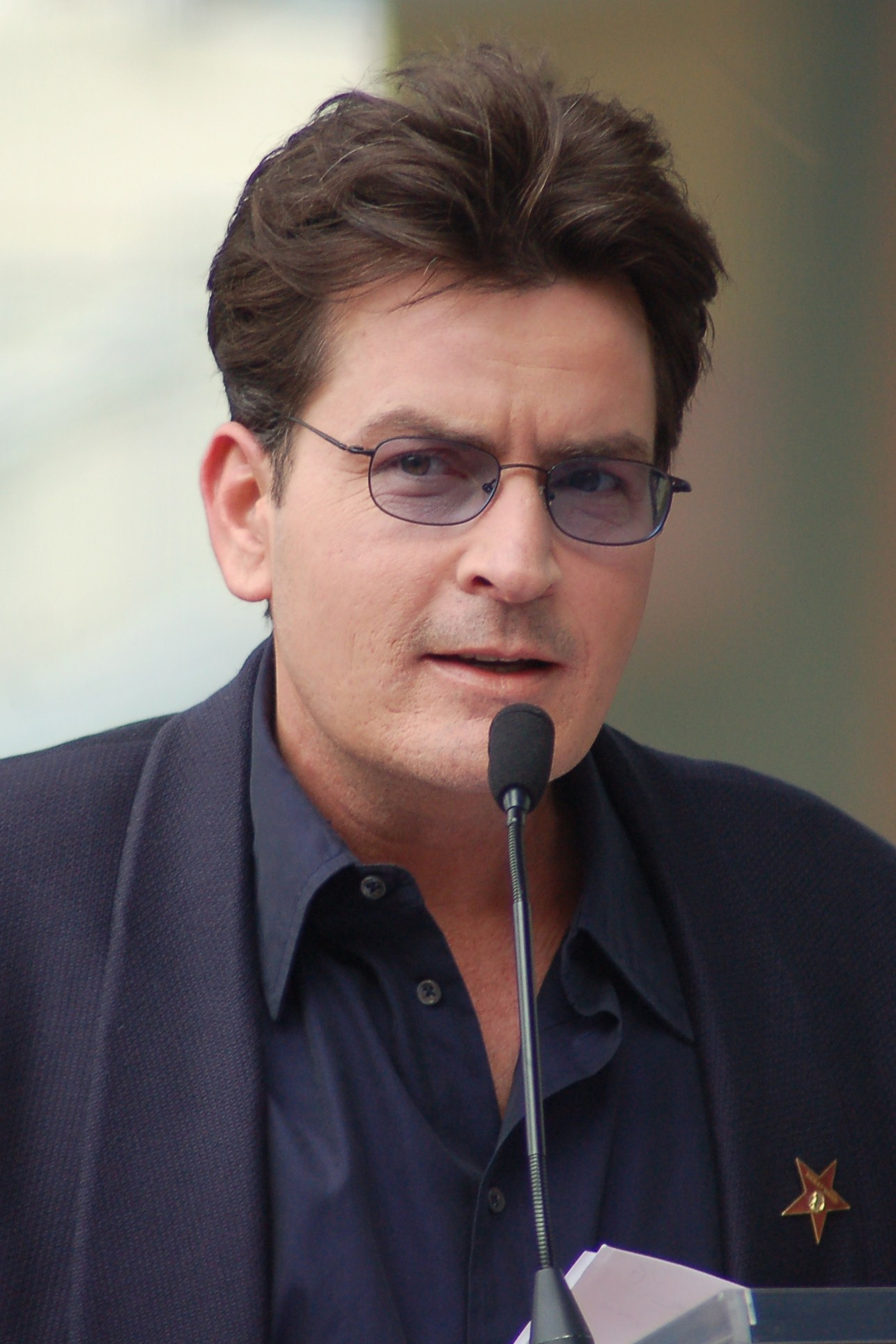
Charlie Sheen, Best Actor in a Television Series – Musical or Comedy winner

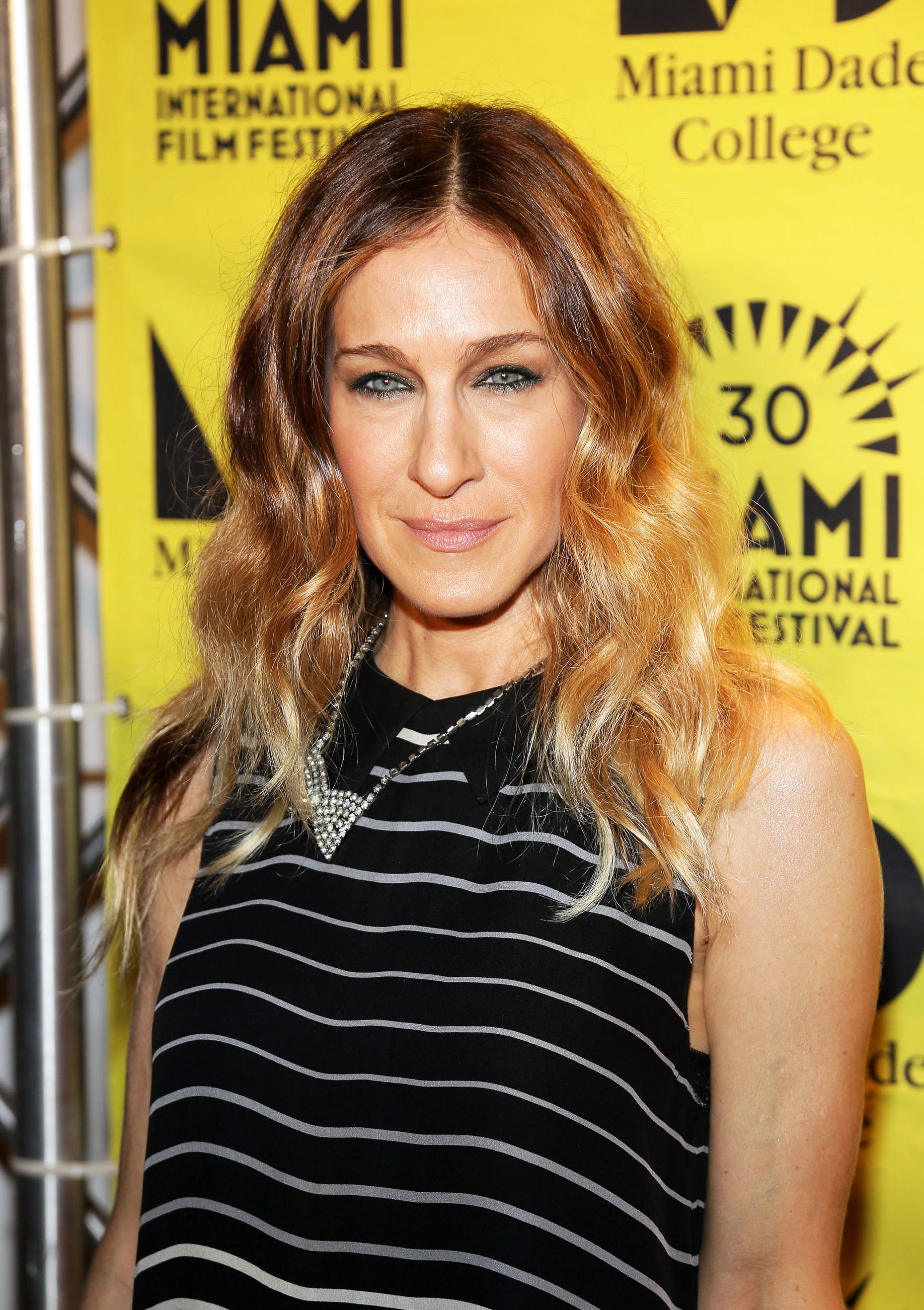
Sarah Jessica Parker, Best Actress in a Television Series – Musical or Comedy winner

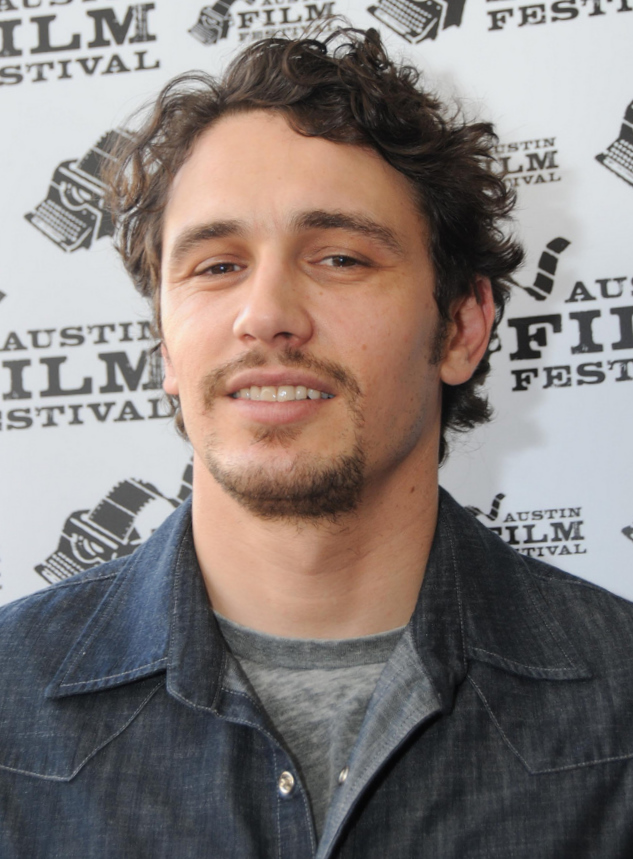
James Franco, Best Actor in a Miniseries or Television Film winner

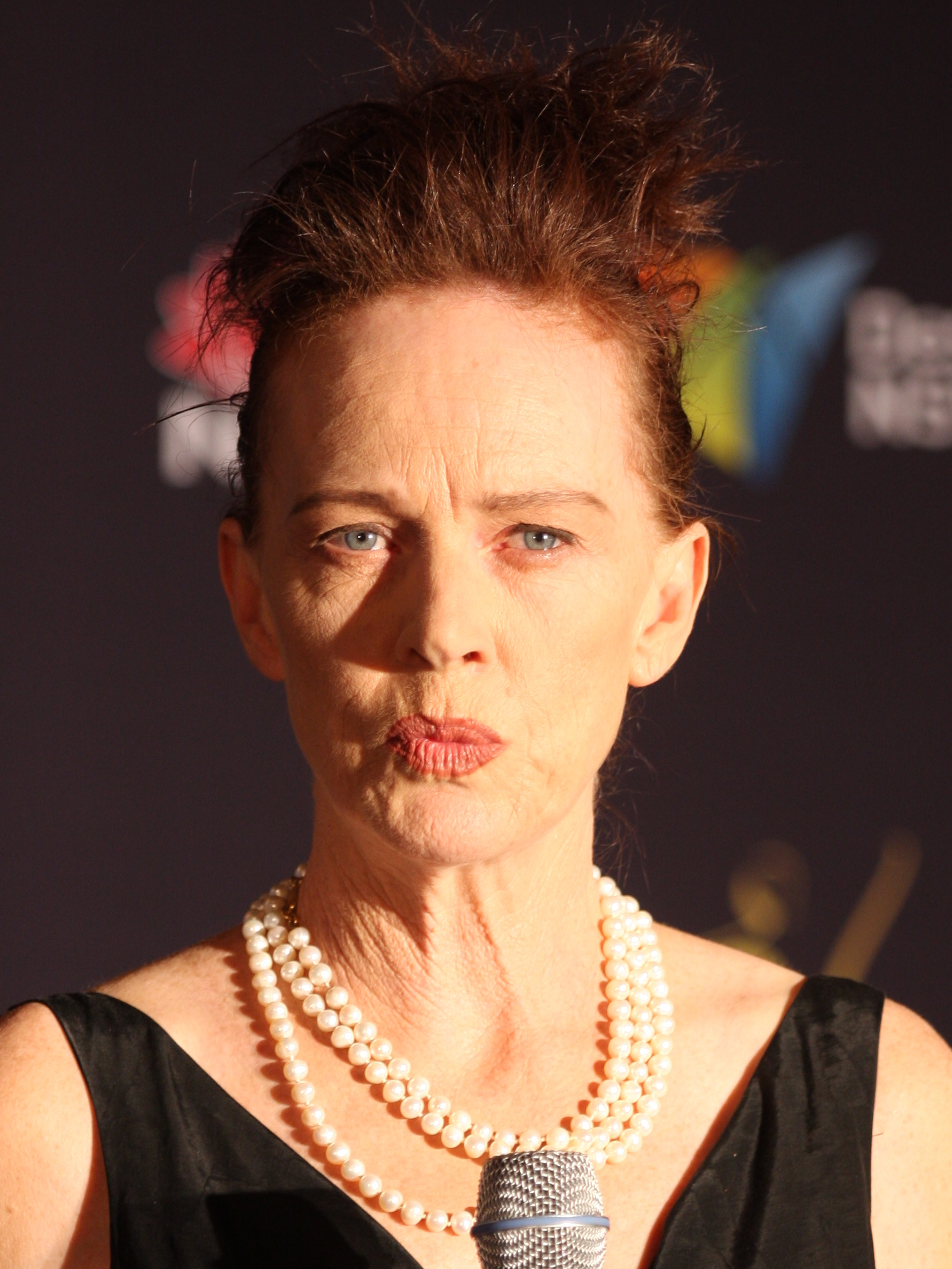
Judy Davis, Best Actress in a Miniseries or Television Film winner

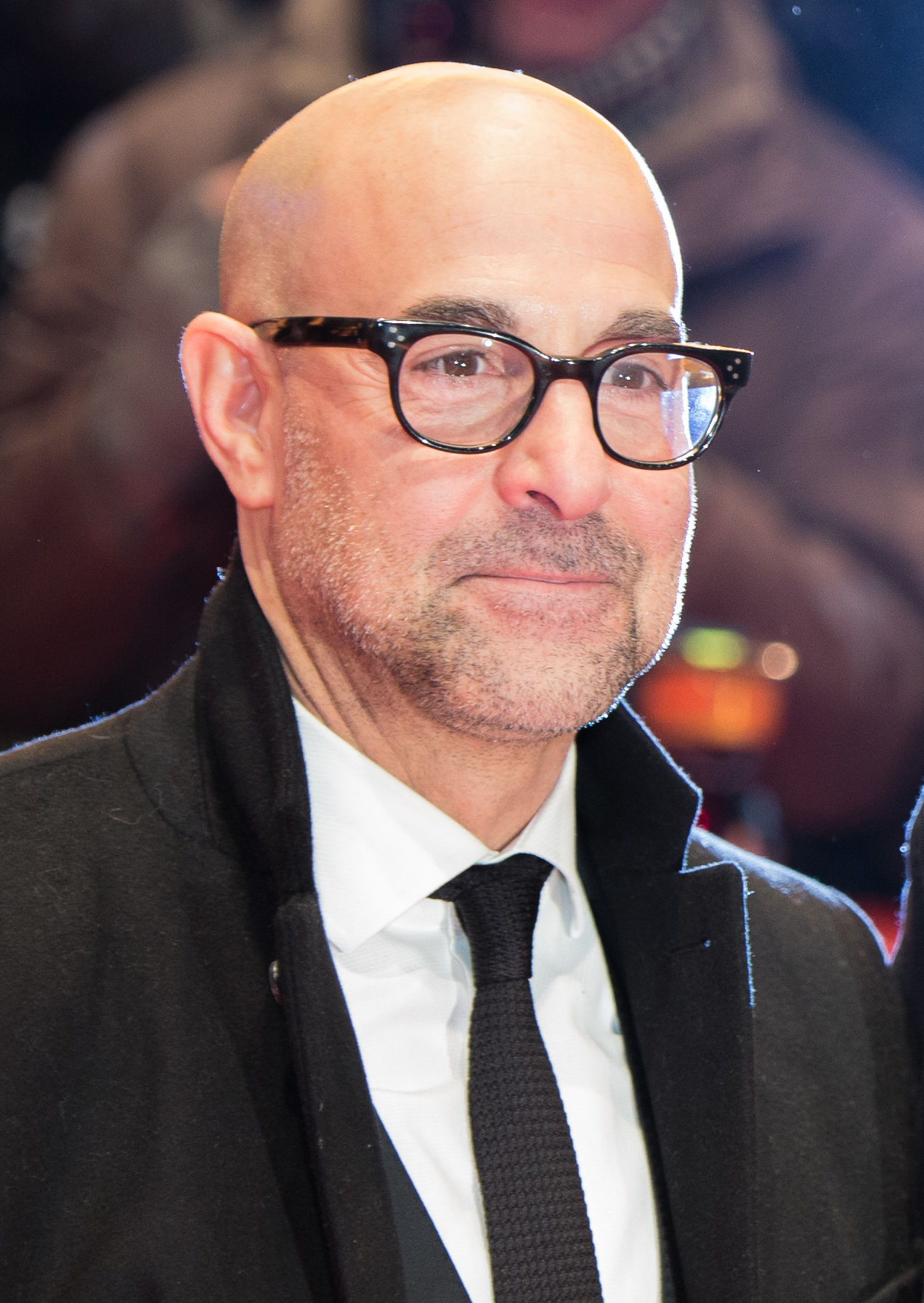
Stanley Tucci, Best Supporting Actor in a Series, Miniseries, or Television Film winner

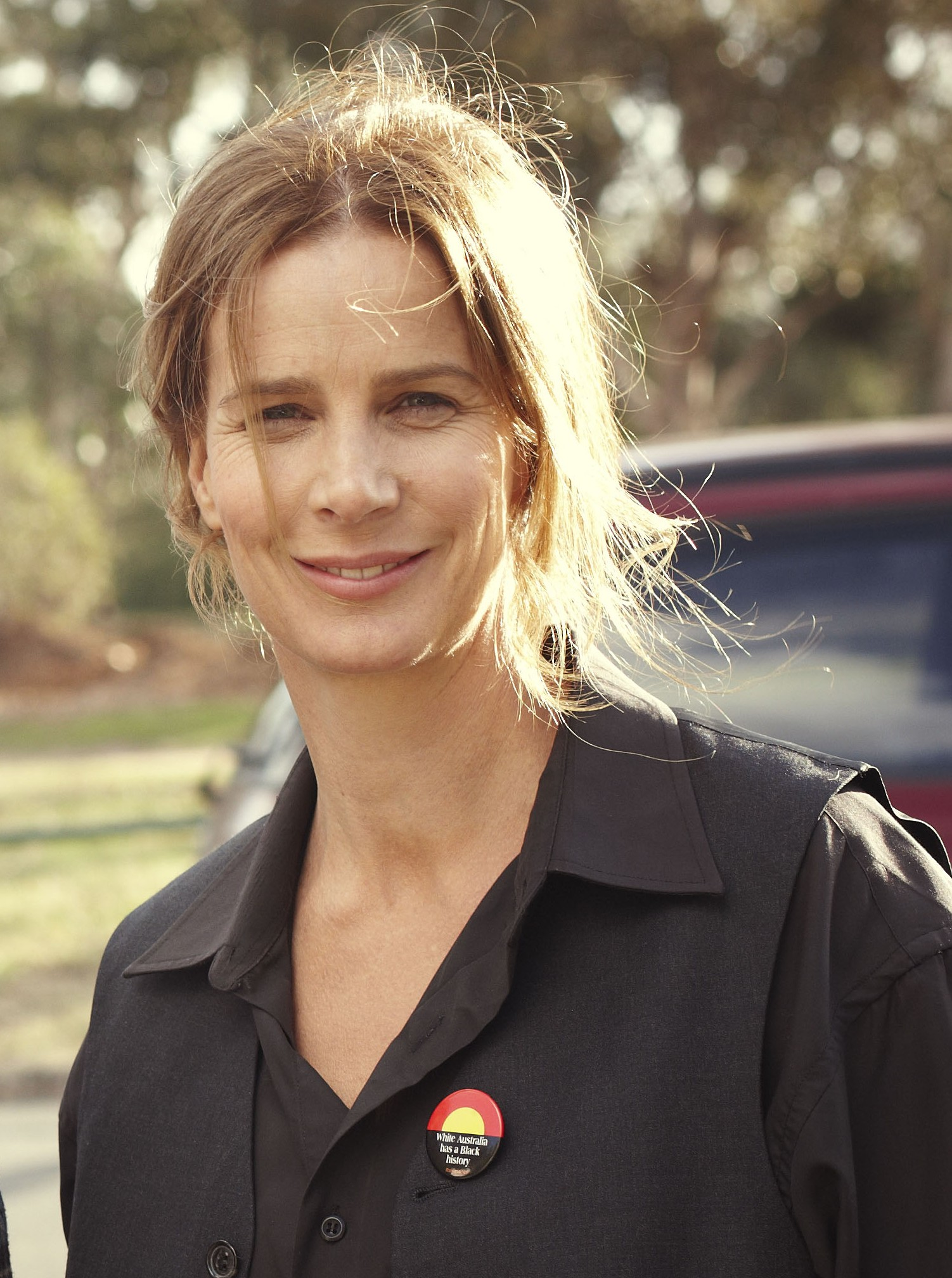
Rachel Griffiths, Best Supporting Actress in a Series, Miniseries, or Television Film winner

=== Film ===
Best Motion Picture
Drama	Musical or Comedy
A Beautiful Mind; In the Bedroom; The Lord of the Rings: The Fellowship of the Ring; The Man Who Wasn't There; Mulholland Drive	Moulin Rouge!; Bridget Jones's Diary; Gosford Park; Legally Blonde; Shrek
Best Performance in a Motion Picture – Drama
Actor	Actress
Russell Crowe – A Beautiful Mind as John Nash; Will Smith – Ali as Cassius Clay Jr. / Muhammad Ali; Kevin Spacey – The Shipping News as Quoyle; Billy Bob Thornton – The Man Who Wasn't There as Ed Crane; Denzel Washington – Training Day as Detective Alonzo Harris	Sissy Spacek – In the Bedroom as Ruth Fowler; Halle Berry – Monster's Ball as Leticia Musgrove; Judi Dench – Iris as Iris Murdoch; Nicole Kidman – The Others as Grace Stewart; Tilda Swinton – The Deep End as Margaret Hall
Best Performance in a Motion Picture – Musical or Comedy
Actor	Actress
Gene Hackman – The Royal Tenenbaums as Royal Tenenbaum; Hugh Jackman – Kate & Leopold as Leopold Mountbatten; Ewan McGregor – Moulin Rouge! as Christian; John Cameron Mitchell – Hedwig and the Angry Inch as Hansell Schmidt / Hedwig Robinson; Billy Bob Thornton – Bandits as Terry Collins	Nicole Kidman – Moulin Rouge! as Satine; Thora Birch – Ghost World as Enid Coleslaw; Cate Blanchett – Bandits as Kate Wheeler; Reese Witherspoon – Legally Blonde as Elle Woods; Renée Zellweger – Bridget Jones's Diary as Bridget Jones
Best Supporting Performance in a Motion Picture – Drama, Musical or Comedy
Supporting Actor	Supporting Actress
Jim Broadbent – Iris as John Bayley; Steve Buscemi – Ghost World as Seymour; Hayden Christensen – Life as a House as Sam Monroe; Ben Kingsley – Sexy Beast as Don Logal; Jude Law – A.I. Artificial Intelligence as Gigolo Joe; Jon Voight – Ali as Howard Cosell	Jennifer Connelly – A Beautiful Mind as Alicia Nash; Cameron Diaz – Vanilla Sky as Julianna "Julie" Gianni; Helen Mirren – Gosford Park as Mrs. Wilson; Maggie Smith – Gosford Park as Constance; Marisa Tomei – In the Bedroom as Natalie Strout; Kate Winslet – Iris as young Iris Murdoch
Best Director	Best Screenplay
Robert Altman – Gosford Park; Ron Howard – A Beautiful Mind; Peter Jackson – The Lord of the Rings: The Fellowship of the Ring; Baz Luhrmann – Moulin Rouge!; David Lynch – Mulholland Drive; Steven Spielberg – A.I. Artificial Intelligence	A Beautiful Mind – Akiva Goldsman; Gosford Park – Julian Fellowes; The Man Who Wasn't There – Joel Coen and Ethan Coen; Memento – Christopher Nolan; Mulholland Drive – David Lynch
Best Original Score	Best Original Song
Moulin Rouge! – Craig Armstrong; Ali – Pieter Bourke and Lisa Gerrard; A.I. Artificial Intelligence – John Williams; A Beautiful Mind – James Horner; The Lord of the Rings: The Fellowship of the Ring – Howard Shore; Mulholland Drive – Angelo Badalamenti; Pearl Harbor – Hans Zimmer; The Shipping News – Christopher Young	"Until..." performed by Sting – Kate & Leopold; "Come What May" performed by Nicole Kidman and Ewan McGregor – Moulin Rouge!; "May It Be" performed by Enya – The Lord of the Rings: The Fellowship of the Ring; "There You'll Be" performed by Faith Hill – Pearl Harbor; "Vanilla Sky" performed by Paul McCartney – Vanilla Sky''
Best Foreign Language Film
No Man's Land, Bosnia and Herzegovina; Amélie (Le fabuleux destin d'Amélie Poulain), France; And Your Mother Too (Y Tu Mamá También), Mexico; Behind the Sun (Abril Despedaçado), Brazil; Monsoon Wedding, India

The following films received multiple nominations:

Nominations	Title
6	A Beautiful Mind
6	Moulin Rouge!
5	Gosford Park
4	The Lord of the Rings: The Fellowship of the Ring
4	Mulholland Drive
3	A.I. Artificial Intelligence
3	Ali
3	In the Bedroom
3	Iris
3	The Man Who Wasn't There
2	Bandits
2	Bridge Jones's Diary
2	Ghost World
2	Kate & Leopold
2	Legally Blonde
2	Pearl Harbor
2	The Shipping News
2	Vanilla Sky

The following films received multiple wins:

Wins	Film
4	A Beautiful Mind
3	Moulin Rouge!

=== Television ===
Best Television Series
Drama	Musical or Comedy
Six Feet Under (HBO); 24 (Fox); Alias (ABC); CSI: Crime Scene Investigation (CBS); The Sopranos (HBO); The West Wing (NBC)	Sex and the City (HBO); Ally McBeal (Fox); Frasier (NBC); Friends (NBC); Will & Grace (NBC)
Best Performance in a Television Series – Drama
Actor	Actress
Kiefer Sutherland – 24 (Fox) as Jack Bauer; Simon Baker – The Guardian (CBS) as Nick Fallin; James Gandolfini – The Sopranos (HBO) as Tony Soprano; Peter Krause – Six Feet Under (HBO) as Nate Fisher; Martin Sheen – The West Wing (NBC) as President Josiah "Jed" Bartlet	Jennifer Garner – Alias (ABC) as Sydney Bristow; Lorraine Bracco – The Sopranos (HBO) as Dr. Jennifer Melfi; Amy Brenneman – Judging Amy (CBS) as Judge Amy Gray; Edie Falco – The Sopranos (HBO) as Carmela Soprano; Lauren Graham – Gilmore Girls (The WB) as Lorelai Gilmore; Marg Helgenberger – CSI: Crime Scene Investigation (CBS) as Catherine Willows; Sela Ward – Once and Again (ABC) as Lily Manning
Best Performance in a Television Series – Musical or Comedy
Actor	Actress
Charlie Sheen – Spin City (ABC) as Charlie Crawford; Tom Cavanagh – Ed (NBC) as Ed Stevens; Kelsey Grammer – Frasier (NBC) as Dr. Frasier Crane; Frankie Muniz – Malcolm in the Middle (Fox) as Malcolm Wilkerson; Eric McCormack – Will & Grace (NBC) as Will Truman	Sarah Jessica Parker – Sex and the City (HBO) as Carrie Bradshaw; Calista Flockhart – Ally McBeal (Fox) as Ally McBeal; Jane Kaczmarek – Malcolm in the Middle (Fox) as Lois Wilkerson; Heather Locklear – Spin City (ABC) as Caitlin Moore; Debra Messing – Will & Grace (NBC) as Grace Adler
Best Performance in a Miniseries or Television Film
Actor	Actress
James Franco – James Dean (TNT) as James Dean; Kenneth Branagh – Conspiracy (HBO) as Reinhard Heydrich; Ben Kingsley – Anne Frank: The Whole Story (ABC) as Otto Frank; Damian Lewis – Band of Brothers (HBO) as Major Richard Winters; Barry Pepper – 61* (HBO) as Roger Maris	Judy Davis – Life with Judy Garland: Me and My Shadows (ABC) as Judy Garland; Bridget Fonda – After Amy (Lifetime) as Linda Sinclair; Julianna Margulies – The Mists of Avalon (TNT) as Morgaine; Leelee Sobieski – Uprising (NBC) as Tosia Altman; Hannah Taylor-Gordon – Anne Frank: The Whole Story (ABC) as Anne Frank; Emma Thompson – Wit (HBO) as Vivian Bearing
Best Supporting Performance in a Series, Miniseries or Television Film
Supporting Actor	Supporting Actress
Stanley Tucci – Conspiracy (HBO) as Adolf Eichmann; John Corbett – Sex and the City (HBO) as Aidan Shaw; Sean Hayes – Will & Grace (NBC) as Jack McFarland; Ron Livingston – Band of Brothers (HBO) as Captain Lewis Nixon; Bradley Whitford – The West Wing (NBC) as Josh Lyman	Rachel Griffiths – Six Feet Under (HBO) as Brenda Chenowith; Jennifer Aniston – Friends (NBC) as Rachel Green; Tammy Blanchard – Life with Judy Garland: Me and My Shadows (ABC) as Judy Garland (age 12–21); Allison Janney – The West Wing (NBC) as C.J. Cregg; Megan Mullally – Will & Grace (NBC) as Karen Walker
Best Miniseries or Television Film
Band of Brothers (HBO); Anne Frank: The Whole Story (ABC); Conspiracy (HBO); Life with Judy Garland: Me and My Shadows (ABC); Wit (HBO)

The following programs received multiple nominations:

Nominations	Title
5	Will & Grace
4	The West Wing
4	The Sopranos
3	Anne Frank: The Whole Story
3	Band of Brothers
3	Conspiracy
3	Life with Judy Garland: Me and My Shadows
3	Six Feet Under
3	Sex and the City
2	24
2	Alias
2	Ally McBeal
2	CSI: Crime Scene Investigation
2	Frasier
2	Friends
2	Malcolm in the Middle
2	Spin City
2	Wit

The following programs received multiple wins:

Wins	Film
2	Six Feet Under
2	Sex and the City

== Ceremony ==
=== Presenters ===
- Ben Affleck
- Jessica Alba
- Annette Bening
- Halle Berry
- Benjamin Bratt
- Michael Caine
- Cameron Diaz
- Robert Downey Jr.
- Ralph Fiennes
- Jamie Foxx
- Andy Garcia
- Mel Gibson
- Kelsey Grammer
- Tom Hanks
- Josh Hartnett
- Kate Hudson
- Jeremy Irons
- Hugh Jackman
- Julia Louis-Dreyfus
- Andie MacDowell
- Dylan McDermott
- Ian McKellen
- Carrie-Anne Moss
- Mike Myers
- Sarah Jessica Parker
- Ryan Phillippe
- Dennis Quaid
- Leah Remini
- Martin Sheen
- Sting
- Audrey Tautou
- Sela Ward
- Naomi Watts
- Damon Wayans
- Tom Welling
- Kate Winslet
- Renée Zellweger

=== Cecil B. DeMille Award ===
Harrison Ford

== Awards breakdown ==
The following networks received multiple nominations:

Nominations	Network
18	HBO
16	NBC
11	ABC
4	CBS
2	TNT

The following networks received multiple wins:

Wins	Network
4	HBO

== See also ==
- 74th Academy Awards
- 22nd Golden Raspberry Awards
- 8th Screen Actors Guild Awards
- 53rd Primetime Emmy Awards
- 54th Primetime Emmy Awards
- 55th British Academy Film Awards
- 56th Tony Awards
- 2001 in film
- 2001 in American television
