= 2001 Los Angeles Film Critics Association Awards =

Annual US film awards ceremony

27th LAFCA Awards
- Date: December 15, 2001

Highlights
- Best Picture: In the Bedroom

The 27th Los Angeles Film Critics Association Awards, honoring the best in film for 2001, were given on 15 December 2001.

== Winners ==
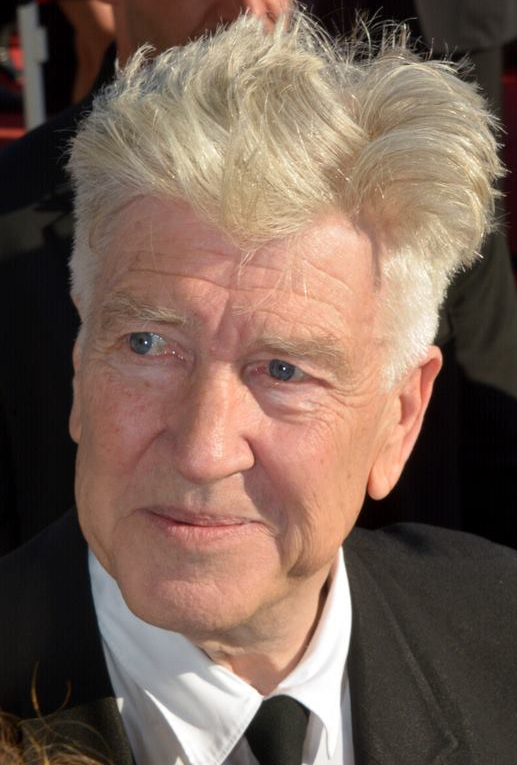
David Lynch, Best Director winner

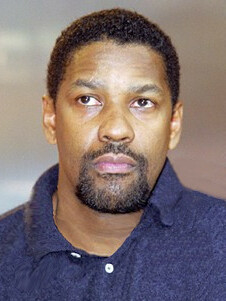
Denzel Washington, Best Actor winner

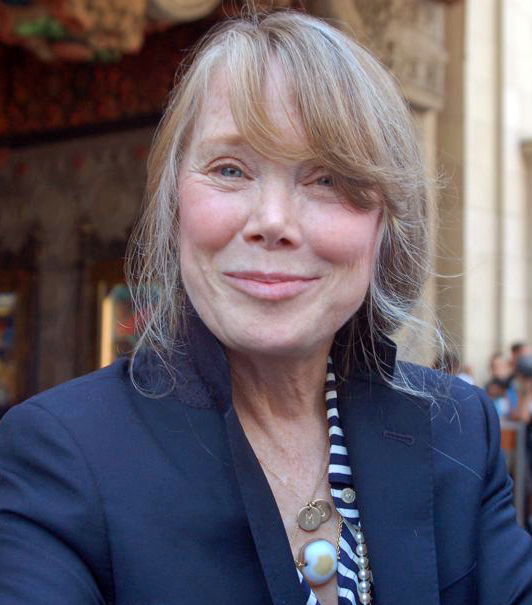
Sissy Spacek, Best Actress winner

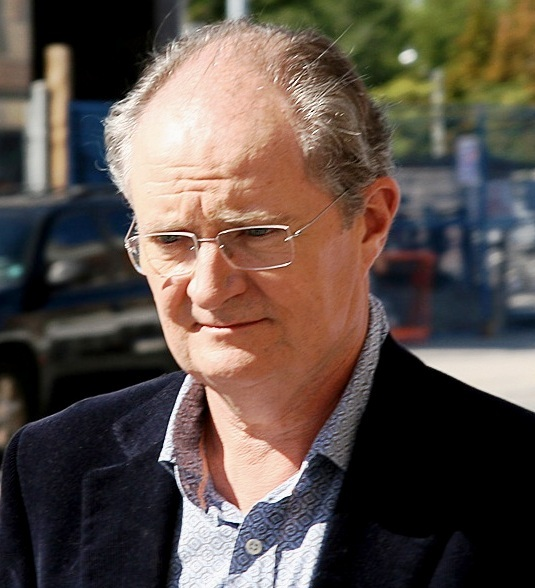
Jim Broadbent, Best Supporting Actor winner

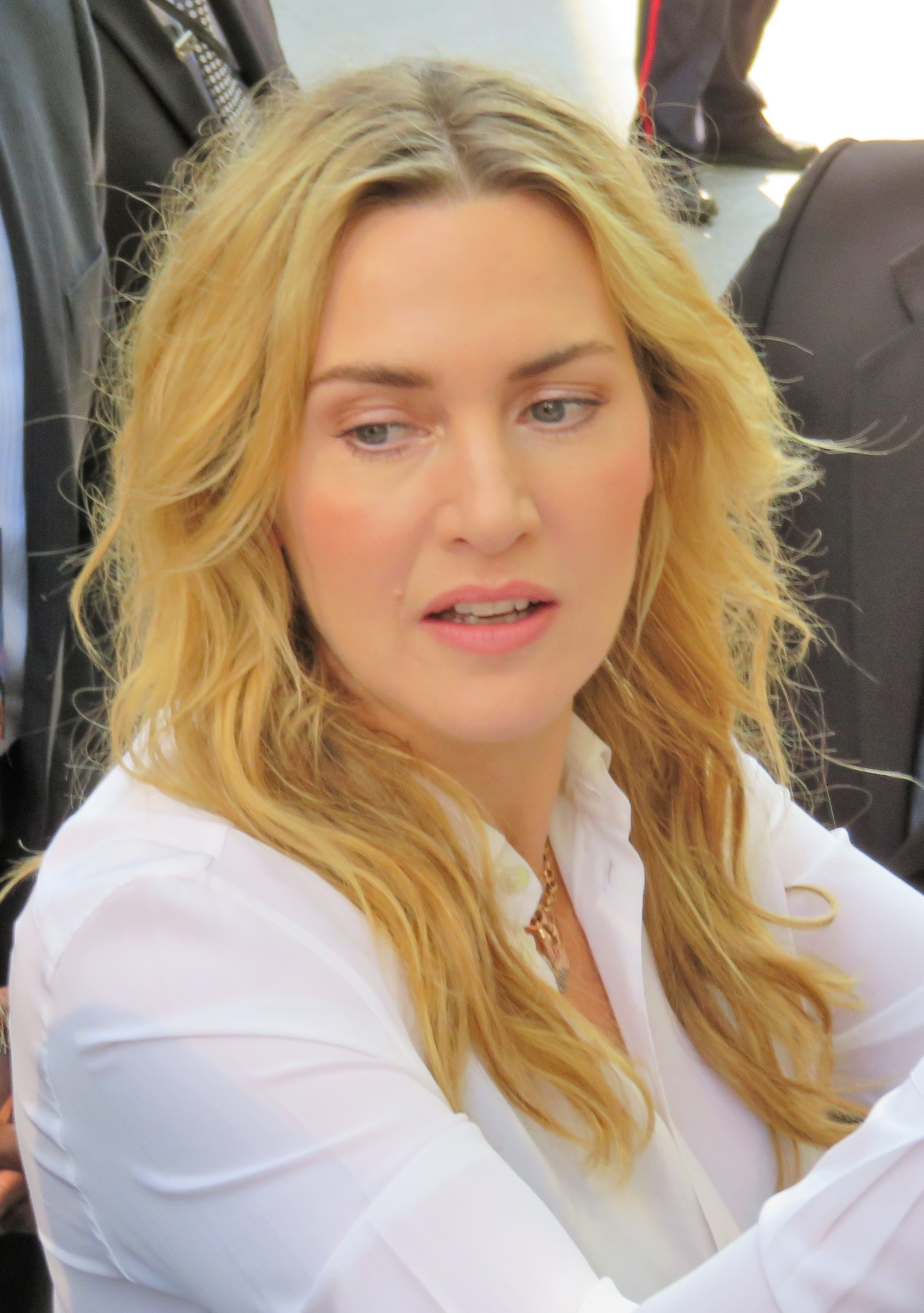
Kate Winslet, Best Supporting Actress winner

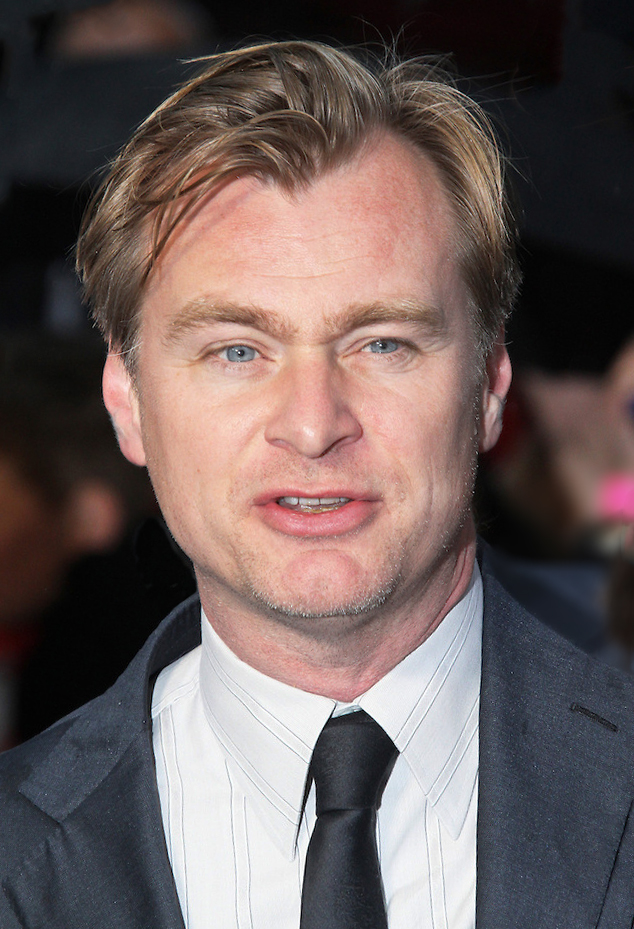
Christopher Nolan, Best Screenplay winner

- Best Picture:
  - In the Bedroom
  - Runner-up: Mulholland Drive
- Best Director:
  - David Lynch – Mulholland Drive
  - Runner-up: Robert Altman – Gosford Park
- Best Actor:
  - Denzel Washington – Training Day
  - Runner-up: Tom Wilkinson – In the Bedroom
- Best Actress:
  - Sissy Spacek – In the Bedroom
  - Runner-up: Naomi Watts – Mulholland Drive
- Best Supporting Actor:
  - Jim Broadbent – Iris and Moulin Rouge!
  - Runner-up: Ben Kingsley – Sexy Beast
- Best Supporting Actress:
  - Kate Winslet – Iris
  - Runner-up: Helen Mirren – Gosford Park and Last Orders
- Best Screenplay:
  - Christopher Nolan – Memento
  - Runner-up: Terry Zwigoff and Daniel Clowes – Ghost World
- Best Cinematography:
  - Roger Deakins – The Man Who Wasn't There
  - Runner-up: Christopher Doyle and Mark Lee Ping Bin – In the Mood for Love (Fa yeung nin wa)
- Best Production Design:
  - Catherine Martin – Moulin Rouge!
  - Runner-up: Grant Major – The Lord of the Rings: The Fellowship of the Ring
- Best Music Score:
  - Howard Shore – The Lord of the Rings: The Fellowship of the Ring
  - Runner-up: Stephen Trask – Hedwig and the Angry Inch
- Best Foreign-Language Film:
  - No Man's Land • Bosnia-Herzegovina
  - Runner-up: In the Mood for Love (Fa yeung nin wa) • Hong Kong / France
- Best Non-Fiction Film:
  - The Gleaners and I (Les glaneurs et la glaneuse)
- Best Animation:
  - Shrek
  - Runner-up: Monsters, Inc.
- The Douglas Edwards Experimental/Independent Film/Video Award:
  - The Beaver Trilogy
- New Generation Award:
  - John Cameron Mitchell – Hedwig and the Angry Inch
- Career Achievement Award:
  - Ennio Morricone
- Special Citation:
  - Joe Grant
