= Elegy for Iris =

1999 memoir by John Bayley

- Author: John Bayley
- Language: English
- Genre: Memoir
- Publisher: St. Martin's Press
- Publication date: 1999
- Publication place: United States
- ISBN: 0-312-19864-7

Elegy for Iris is a 1999 memoir by John Bayley. In it, he recounts his forty-two year marriage to fellow author Iris Murdoch and her struggles with Alzheimer's disease in the last years of her life. It is a companion book to Bayley's other works about Murdoch: Iris and Her Friends and Widower's House.

For The New York Times, Mary Gordon wrote that Bayley's narrative is "a continuing act of heroic love, but the heroism plays itself out in a register that is unfamiliar to contemporary audiences, particularly American ones. Its dominant notes are humility, modesty, patience and humor. The heroism is all the more admirable for its reluctance to acknowledge that heroism might be defined in such terms."

The 2001 film Iris is inspired by Elegy for Iris, focusing on the beginning and ending of Bayley and Murdoch's lives together.

== First edition ==
- St. Martin's Press, 1999, ISBN 0-312-19864-7 (hardbound)
