= Iris (2001 film) =

2001 biographical film directed by Richard Eyre

- Theatrical release poster
- Directed by: Richard Eyre
- Screenplay by: Richard Eyre; Charles Wood
- Based on: Elegy for Iris by John Bayley
- Produced by: Robert Fox; Scott Rudin
- Starring: Judi Dench; Kate Winslet; Jim Broadbent; Hugh Bonneville
- Cinematography: Roger Pratt
- Edited by: Martin Walsh
- Music by: James Horner
- Production companies: Miramax Films; BBC Films; Intermedia Films; Mirage Enterprises; Fox Iris Productions
- Distributed by: Miramax Films (through Buena Vista International in the United Kingdom and Ireland)
- Release dates: 14 December 2001 (Los Angeles); 18 January 2002 (United Kingdom); 29 March 2002 (United States)
- Running time: 90 minutes
- Countries: United Kingdom; United States
- Language: English
- Budget: $5.5 million
- Box office: $16.2 million

Iris is a 2001 biographical drama film about novelist Iris Murdoch and her relationship with her husband John Bayley. Directed by Richard Eyre from a screenplay he co-wrote with Charles Wood, the film is based on Bayley's 1999 memoir Elegy for Iris. Judi Dench and Jim Broadbent portray Murdoch and Bayley during the later stages of their marriage, while Kate Winslet and Hugh Bonneville appear as the couple in their younger years. The film contrasts the start of their relationship, when Murdoch was an outgoing, dominant individual compared to the timid and scholarly Bayley, and their later life, when Murdoch was suffering from Alzheimer's disease and tended to by a frustrated Bayley in their North Oxford home in Charlbury Road. The beach scenes were filmed at Southwold in Suffolk, one of Murdoch's favourite haunts.

The film had its world premiere in Los Angeles on 14 December 2001, followed by a theatrical release in the United Kingdom on 18 January 2002 and in the United States on 29 March. It grossed $16 million on a $5.5 million budget and received positive reviews, with praise towards the performances. For his role as Bayley, Broadbent won Best Supporting Actor at the 74th Academy Awards, with Dench (Best Actress) and Winslet (Best Supporting Actress) also receiving nominations.

== Plot ==
When the young Iris Murdoch meets fellow student John Bayley at Somerville College, Oxford, he is a naive virgin easily flummoxed by her libertine spirit, arch personality, and obvious artistic talent. Decades later, little has changed and the couple keep house, with John doting on his more famous wife. When Iris begins experiencing forgetfulness and dementia, however, the devoted John struggles with hopelessness and frustration. He becomes her carer, as his wife's mind deteriorates from the ravages of Alzheimer's disease.

== Cast ==
- Judi Dench as Iris Murdoch
  - Kate Winslet as young Iris
- Jim Broadbent as John Bayley
  - Hugh Bonneville as young John
- Penelope Wilton as Janet Stone
  - Juliet Aubrey as young Janet
- Timothy West as Maurice
  - Samuel West as young Maurice
- Siobhan Hayes as Checkout girl
- Kris Marshall as Dr Gudgeon

== Reception ==
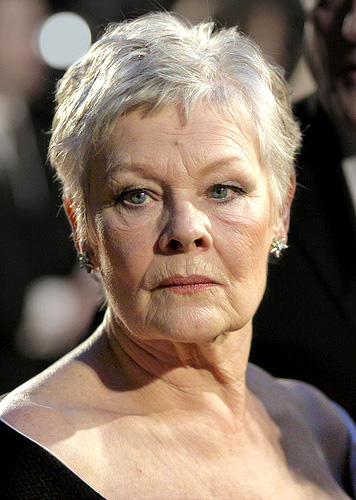
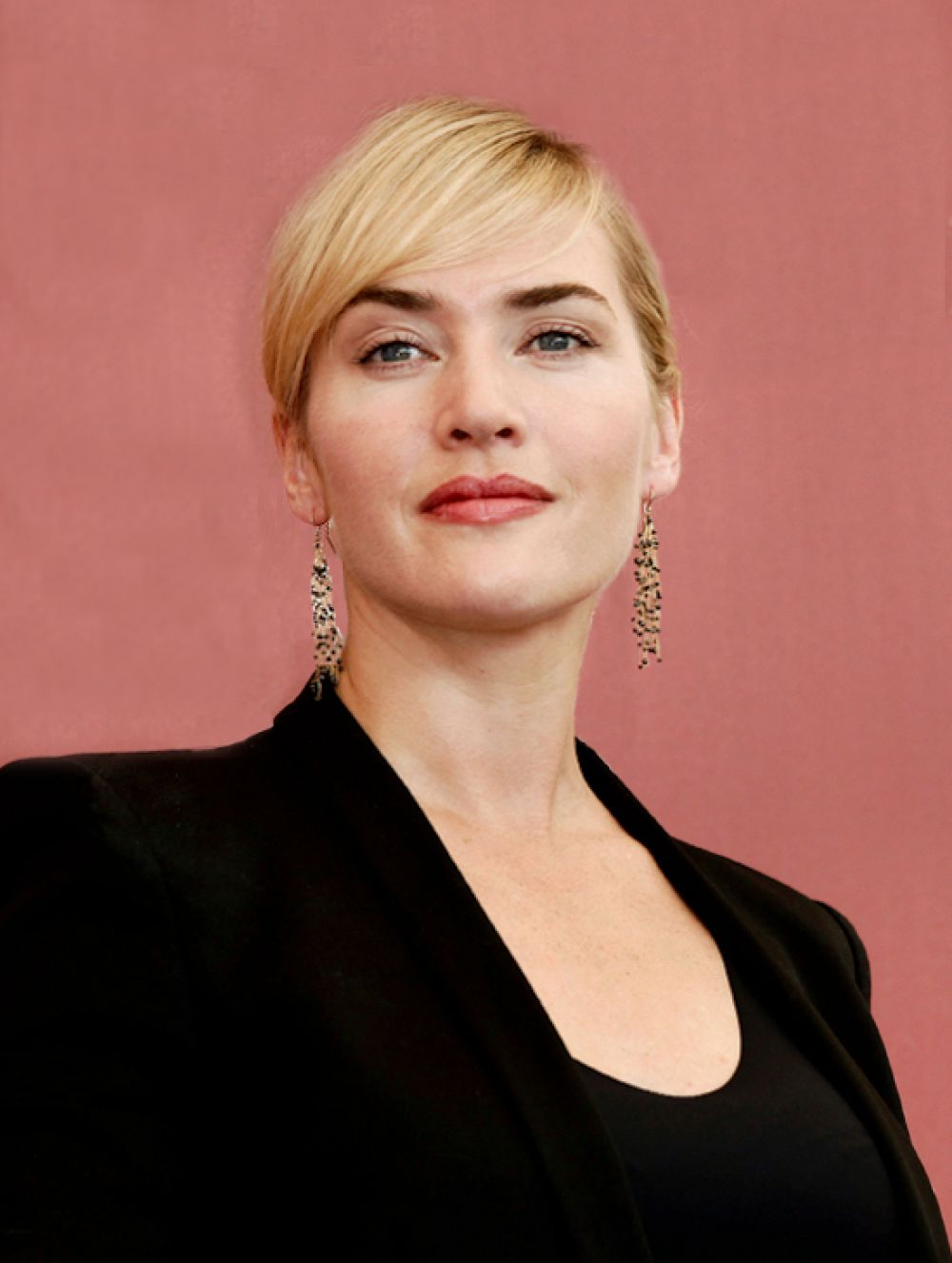
The performances of Judi Dench and Kate Winslet garnered widespread critical acclaim, earning them Academy Award nominations for Best Actress and Best Supporting Actress respectively.

Review aggregator Rotten Tomatoes reported that 79% of 110 critics gave the film a positive review, with an average rating of 7.1/10. The website's critical consensus states, "A solidly constructed drama, Iris is greatly elevated by the strength of its four lead performances." Metacritic assigned the film a weighted average score of 76 out of 100, based on 30 critics, indicating "generally favorable" reviews.

== Awards and nominations ==
Award	Category	Recipient	Result
Academy Awards	Best Actress	Judi Dench	Nominated
Academy Awards	Best Supporting Actor	Jim Broadbent	Won
Academy Awards	Best Supporting Actress	Kate Winslet	Nominated
Awards Circuit Community Awards	Best Actor in a Supporting Role	Jim Broadbent	Nominated
Awards Circuit Community Awards	Best Actress in a Supporting Role	Kate Winslet	Nominated
Berlin International Film Festival	Golden Bear	Richard Eyre	Nominated
Berlin International Film Festival	New Talent Award (Actor)	Hugh Bonneville	Won
British Academy Film Awards	Outstanding British Film	Robert Fox, Scott Rudin and Richard Eyre	Nominated
British Academy Film Awards	Best Actor in a Leading Role	Jim Broadbent	Nominated
British Academy Film Awards	Best Actress in a Leading Role	Judi Dench	Won
British Academy Film Awards	Best Actor in a Supporting Role	Hugh Bonneville	Nominated
British Academy Film Awards	Best Actress in a Supporting Role	Kate Winslet	Nominated
British Academy Film Awards	Best Adapted Screenplay	Richard Eyre and Charles Wood	Nominated
Christopher Awards	Feature Film		Won
Critics' Choice Awards	Best Supporting Actor	Jim Broadbent	Nominated
European Film Awards	Best Actor	Hugh Bonneville	Nominated
European Film Awards	Best Actor	Jim Broadbent	Nominated
European Film Awards	Best Actress	Judi Dench	Nominated
European Film Awards	Best Actress	Kate Winslet	Won
Evening Standard British Film Awards	Best Actress	Kate Winslet (Also for Enigma and Quills)	Won
Golden Globe Awards	Best Actress in a Motion Picture – Drama	Judi Dench	Nominated
Golden Globe Awards	Best Supporting Actor – Motion Picture	Jim Broadbent	Won
Golden Globe Awards	Best Supporting Actress – Motion Picture	Kate Winslet	Nominated
Golden Trailer Awards	Best Documentary Poster		Nominated
Humanitas Prize	Feature Film Category	Richard Eyre and Charles Wood	Won
Las Vegas Film Critics Society Awards	Best Actress	Judi Dench	Nominated
Las Vegas Film Critics Society Awards	Best Supporting Actress	Kate Winslet	Nominated
London Film Critics Circle Awards	British Actress of the Year	Judi Dench	Won
Los Angeles Film Critics Association Awards	Best Supporting Actor	Jim Broadbent (Also for Moulin Rouge!)	Won
Los Angeles Film Critics Association Awards	Best Supporting Actress	Kate Winslet	Won
Nastro d'Argento	Best Song	Moni Ovadia	Nominated
National Board of Review Awards	Best Supporting Actor	Jim Broadbent (Also for Moulin Rouge!)	Won
National Board of Review Awards	Special Recognition For Excellence In Filmmaking		Won
New York Film Critics Circle Awards	Best Actor	Jim Broadbent	Runner-up
New York Film Critics Online Awards	Best Actress	Judi Dench	Won
Phoenix Film Critics Society Awards	Best Actress in a Leading Role	Judi Dench	Nominated
Phoenix Film Critics Society Awards	Best Actor in a Supporting Role	Jim Broadbent	Nominated
Russian Guild of Film Critics Awards	Best Foreign Actress	Judi Dench	Nominated
Satellite Awards	Best Actress in a Motion Picture – Drama	Judi Dench	Nominated
Satellite Awards	Best Supporting Actor in a Motion Picture – Drama	Jim Broadbent	Nominated
Satellite Awards	Best Supporting Actress in a Motion Picture – Drama	Kate Winslet	Nominated
Screen Actors Guild Awards	Outstanding Performance by a Female Actor in a Leading Role	Judi Dench	Nominated
Screen Actors Guild Awards	Outstanding Performance by a Male Actor in a Supporting Role	Jim Broadbent	Nominated
