= 8th Screen Actors Guild Awards =

- Awarded for: Outstanding motion picture and primetime television performances
- Date: March 10, 2002
- Location: Shrine Auditorium; Los Angeles, California
- Country: United States
- Presented by: Screen Actors Guild
- Website: www.sagawards.org

Television/radio coverage
- Network: TNT

The 8th Screen Actors Guild Awards, awarded by the Screen Actors Guild and honoring the best achievements in film and television performances for the year 2001, took place on March 10, 2002. The ceremony was held at the Shrine Exposition Center in Los Angeles, California and was televised live by TNT.

The nominees were announced on January 29, 2002 by Marisa Tomei and Ted Danson at Los Angeles' Pacific Design Center's SilverScreen Theatre.

== Winners and nominees ==
Winners are listed first and highlighted in boldface.

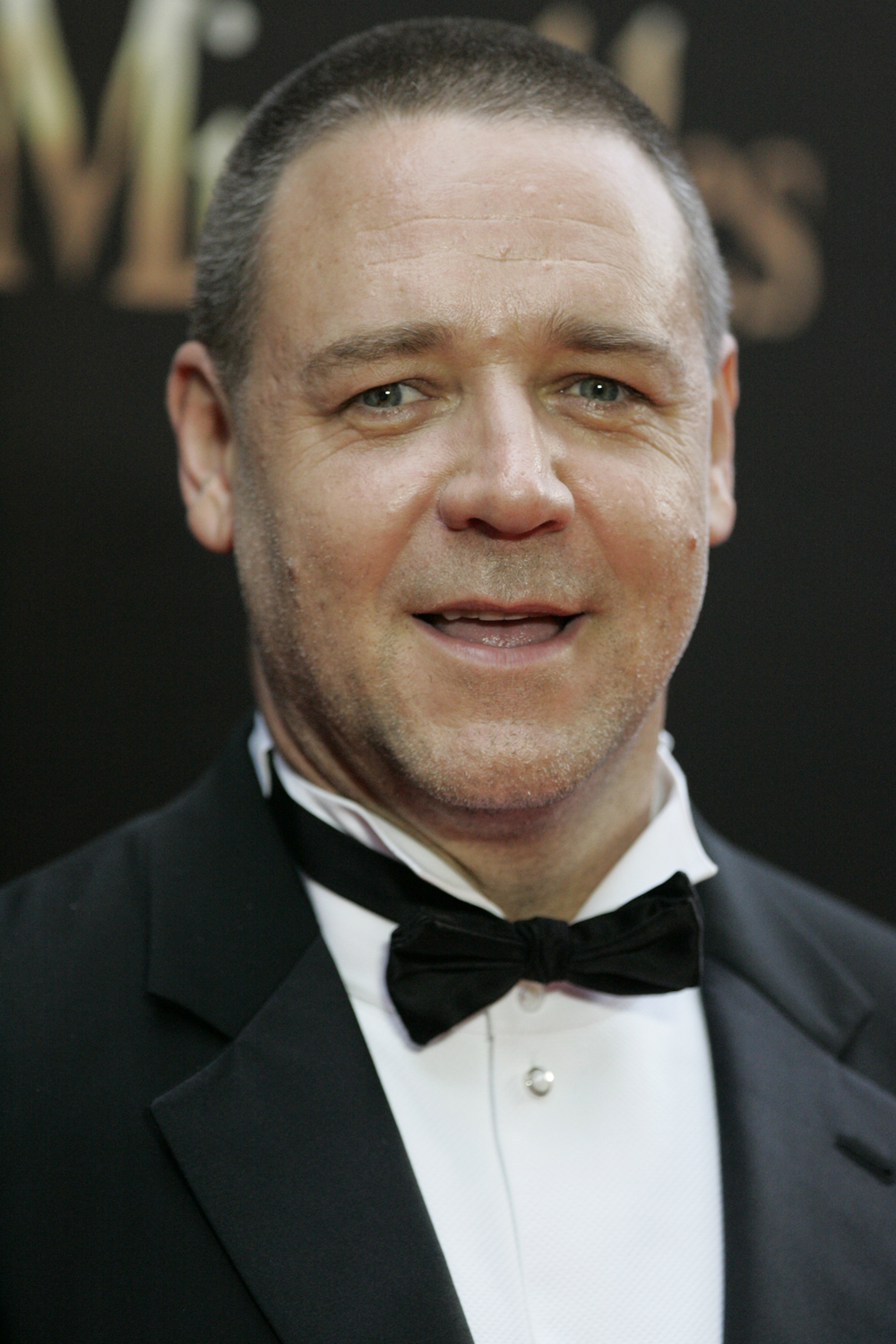
Russell Crowe, Outstanding Performance by a Male Actor in a Leading Role winner

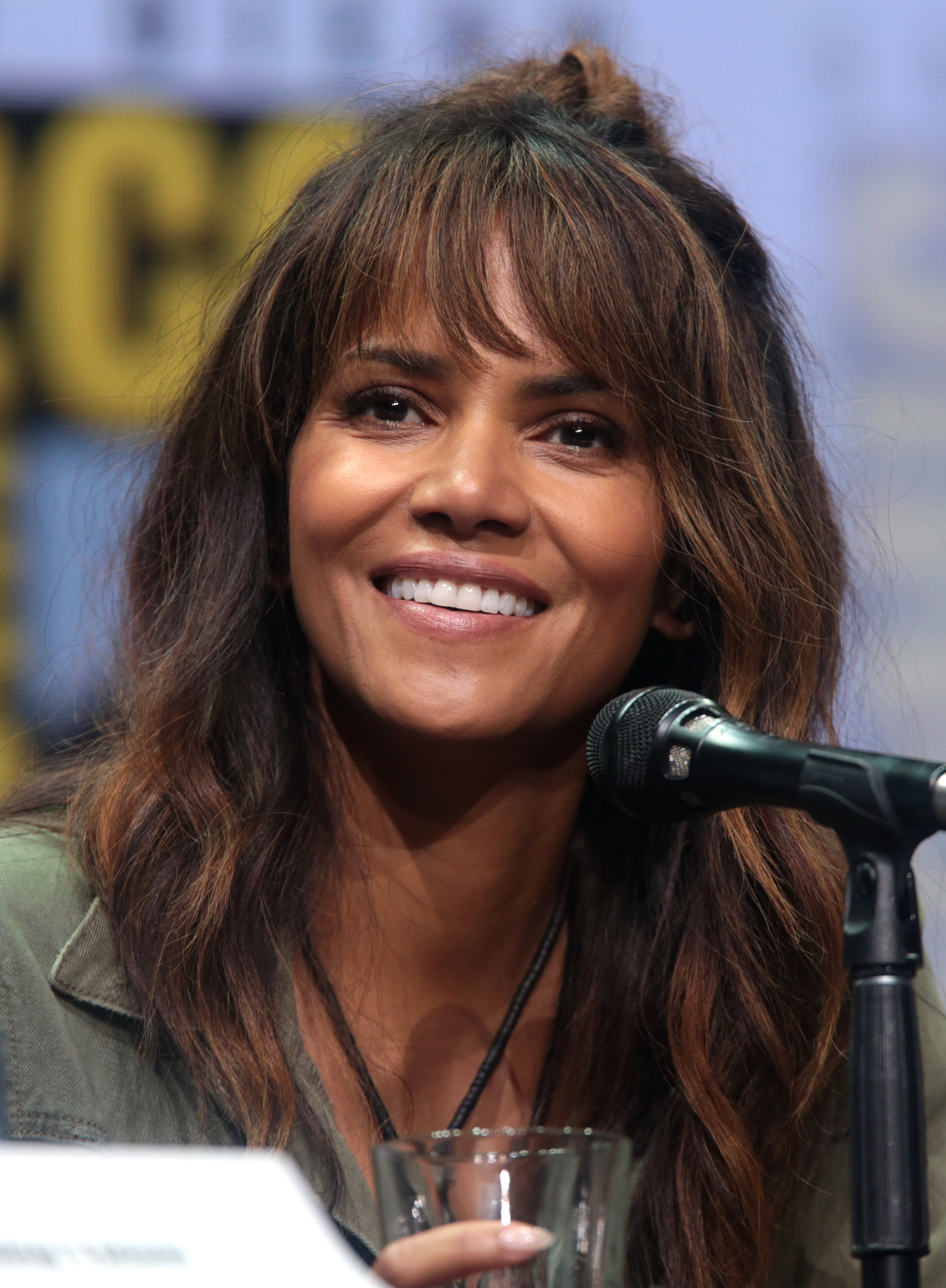
Halle Berry, Outstanding Performance by a Female Actor in a Leading Role winner

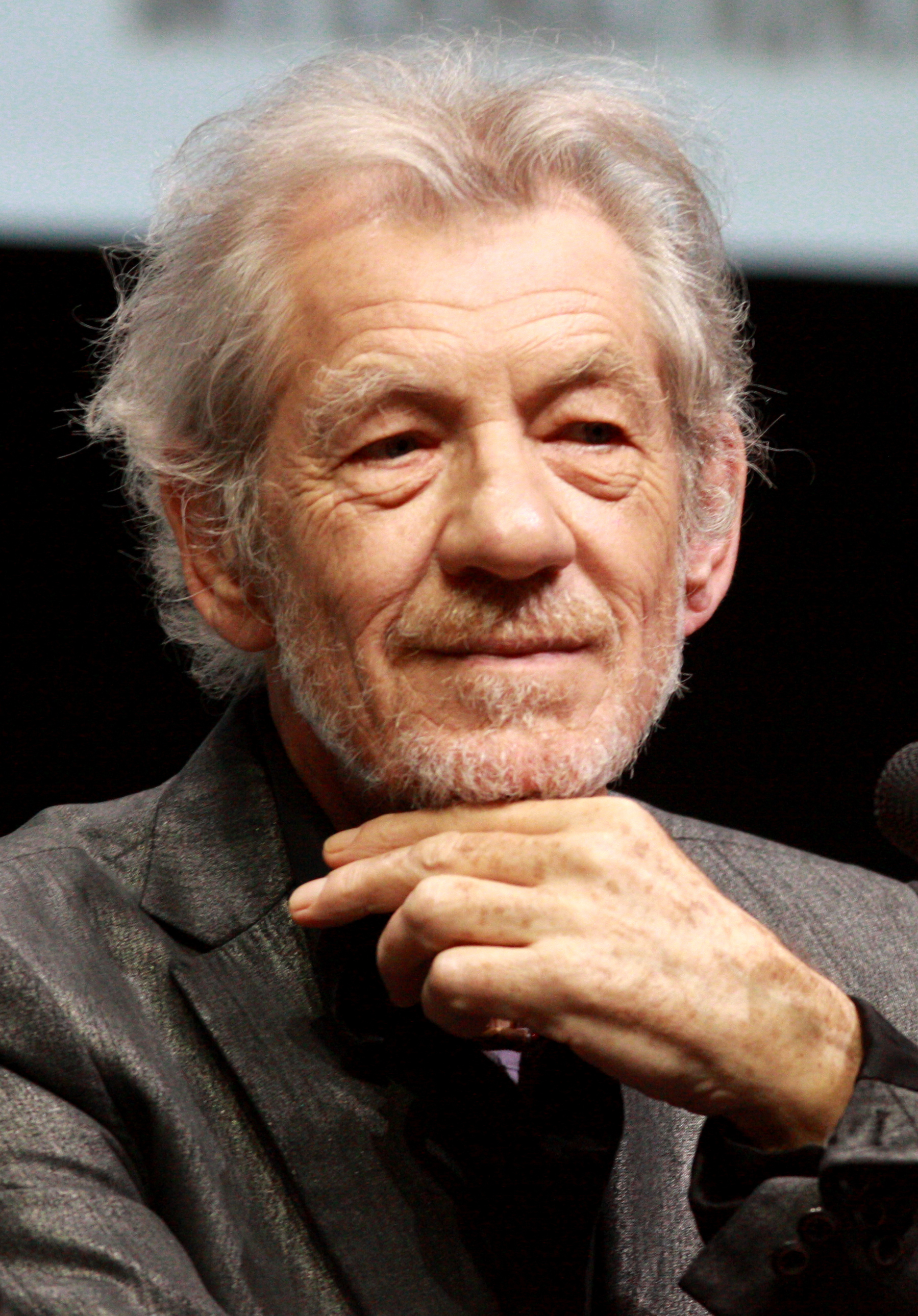
Ian McKellen, Outstanding Performance by a Male Actor in a Supporting Role winner

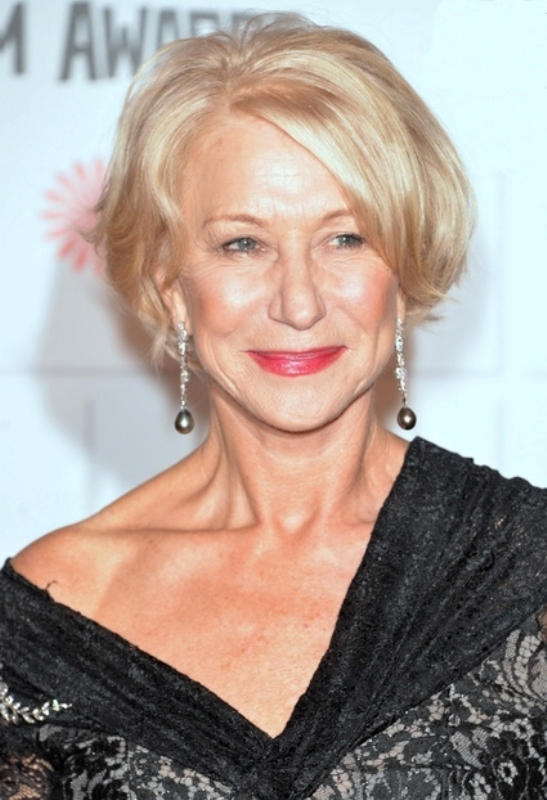
Helen Mirren, Outstanding Performance by a Female Actor in a Supporting Role winner

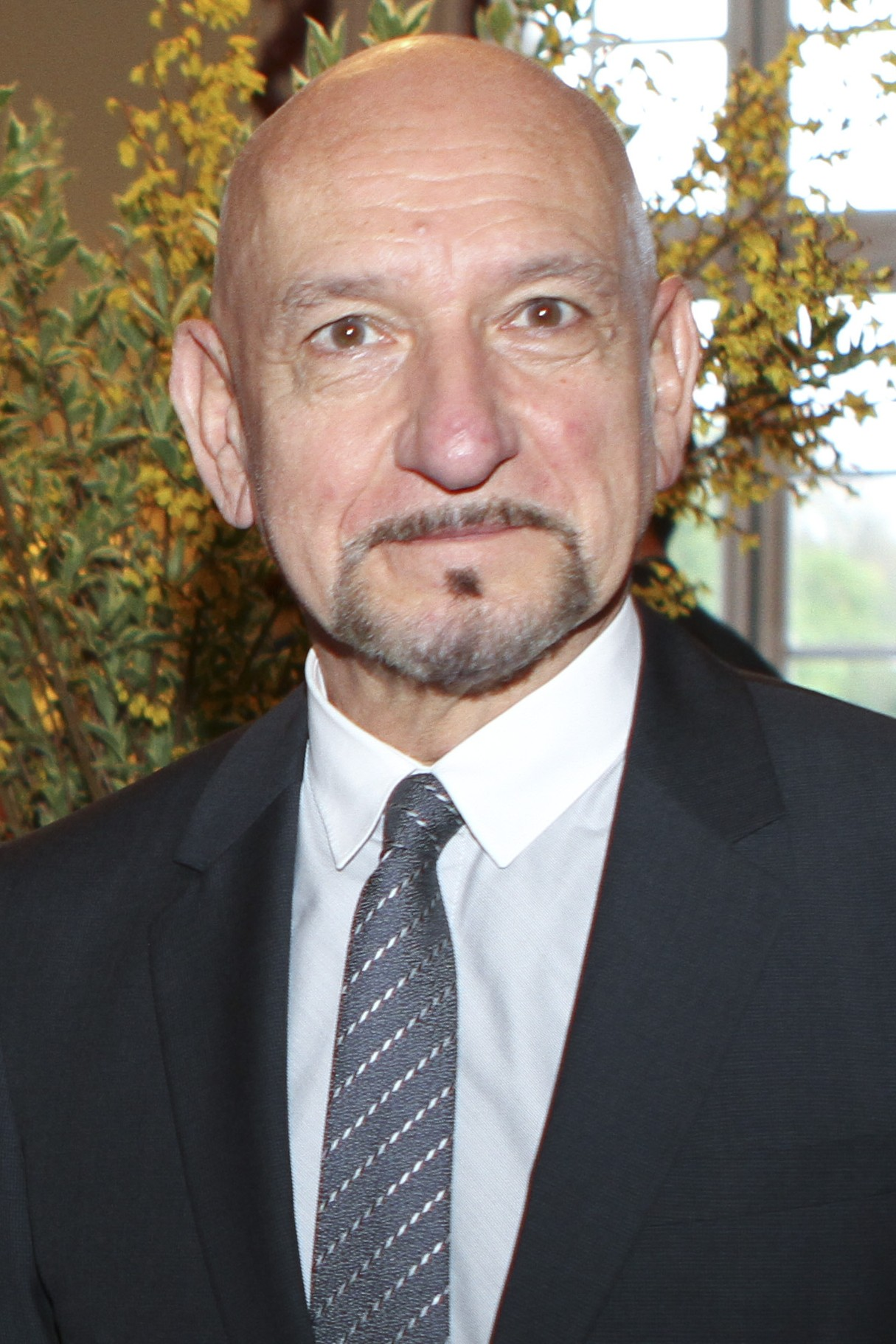
Ben Kingsley, Outstanding Performance by a Male Actor in a Miniseries or Television Movie winner

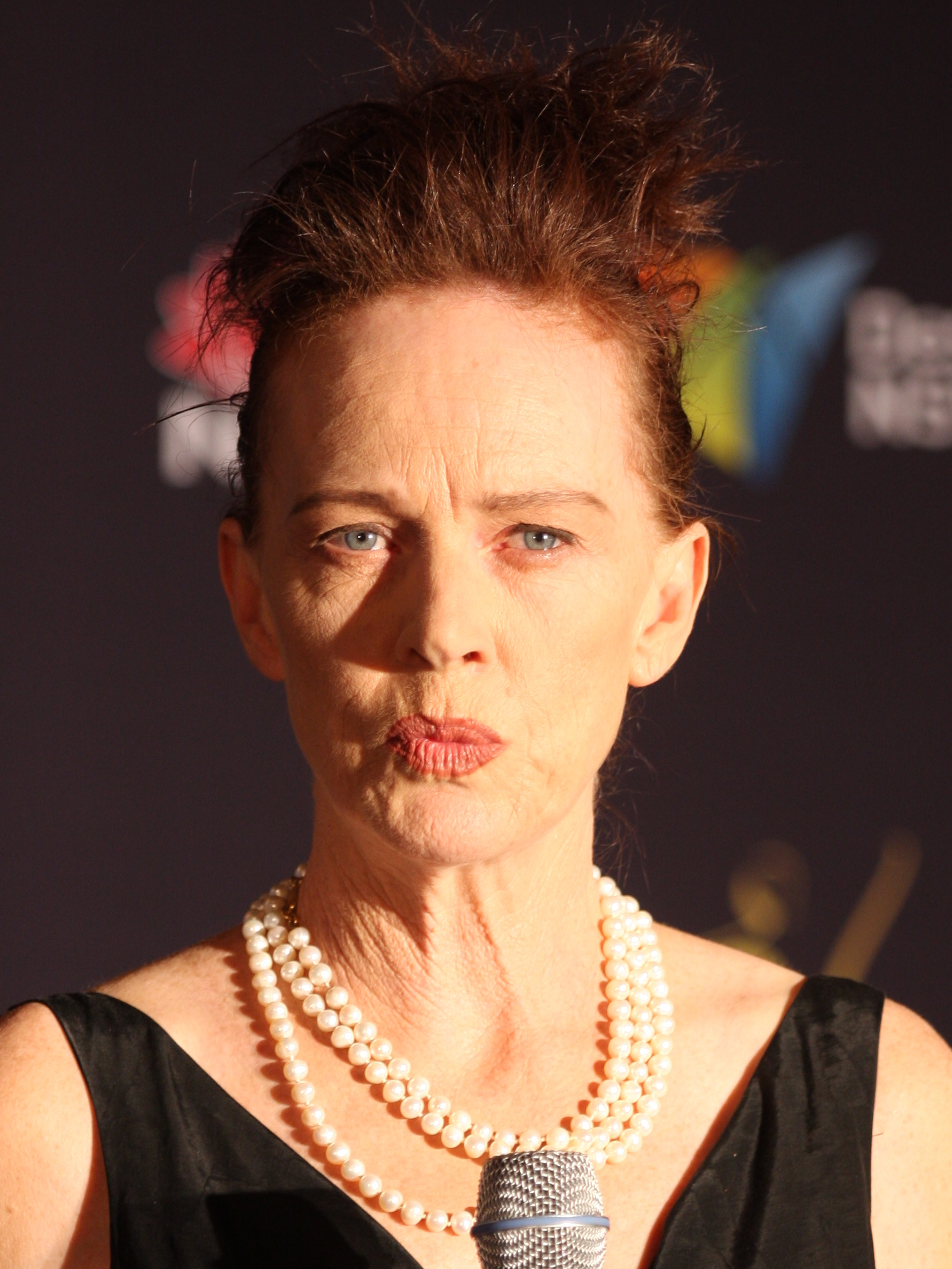
Judy Davis, Outstanding Performance by a Female Actor in a Miniseries or Television Movie winner

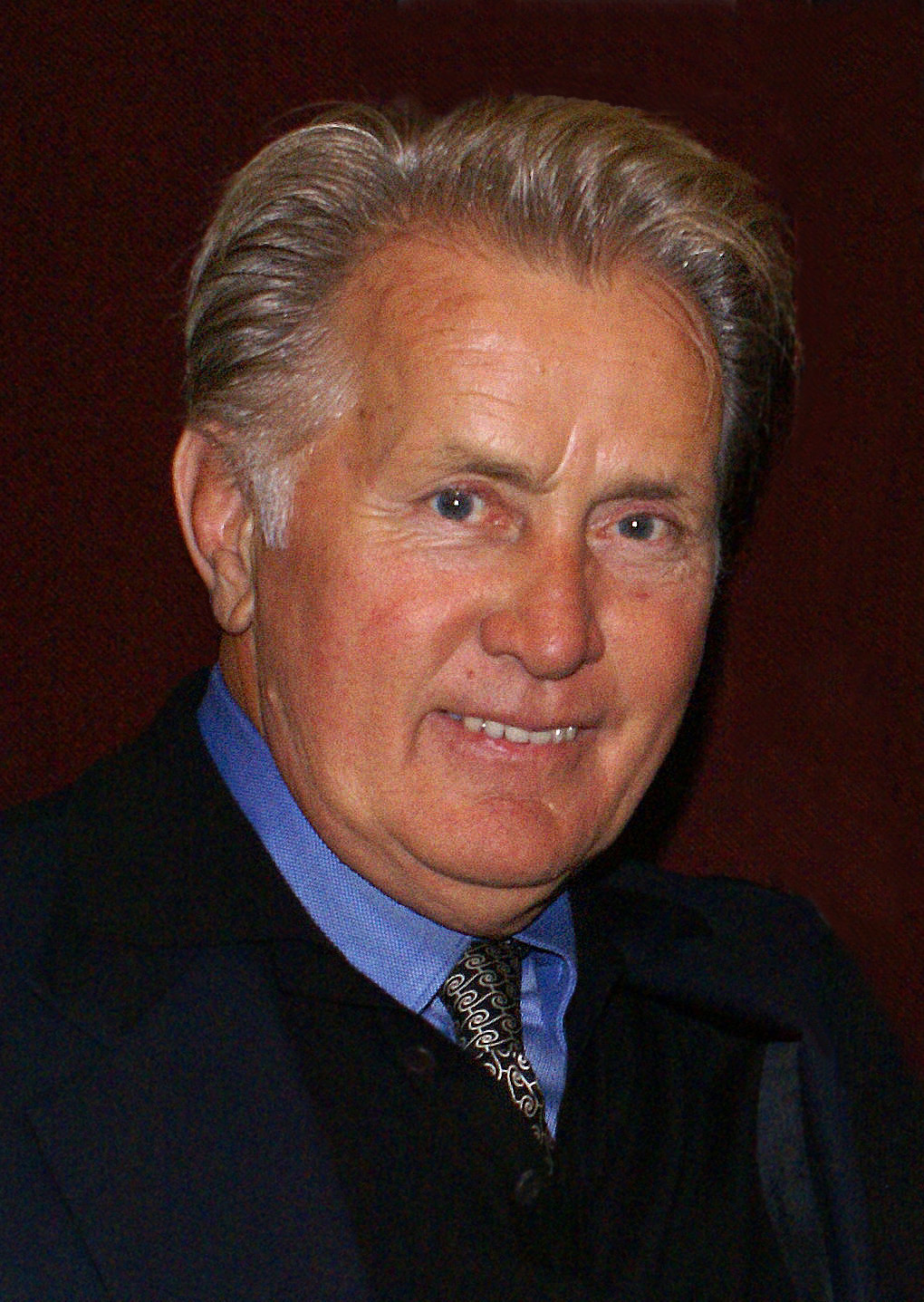
Martin Sheen, Outstanding Performance by a Male Actor in a Drama Series winner

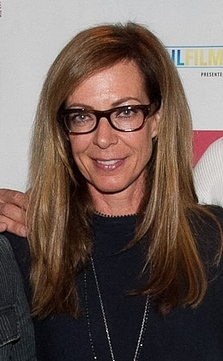
Allison Janney, Outstanding Performance by a Female Actor in a Drama Series winner

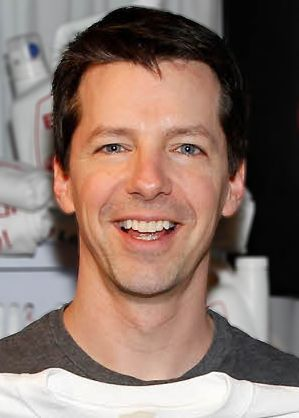
Sean Hayes, Outstanding Performance by a Male Actor in a Comedy Series winner

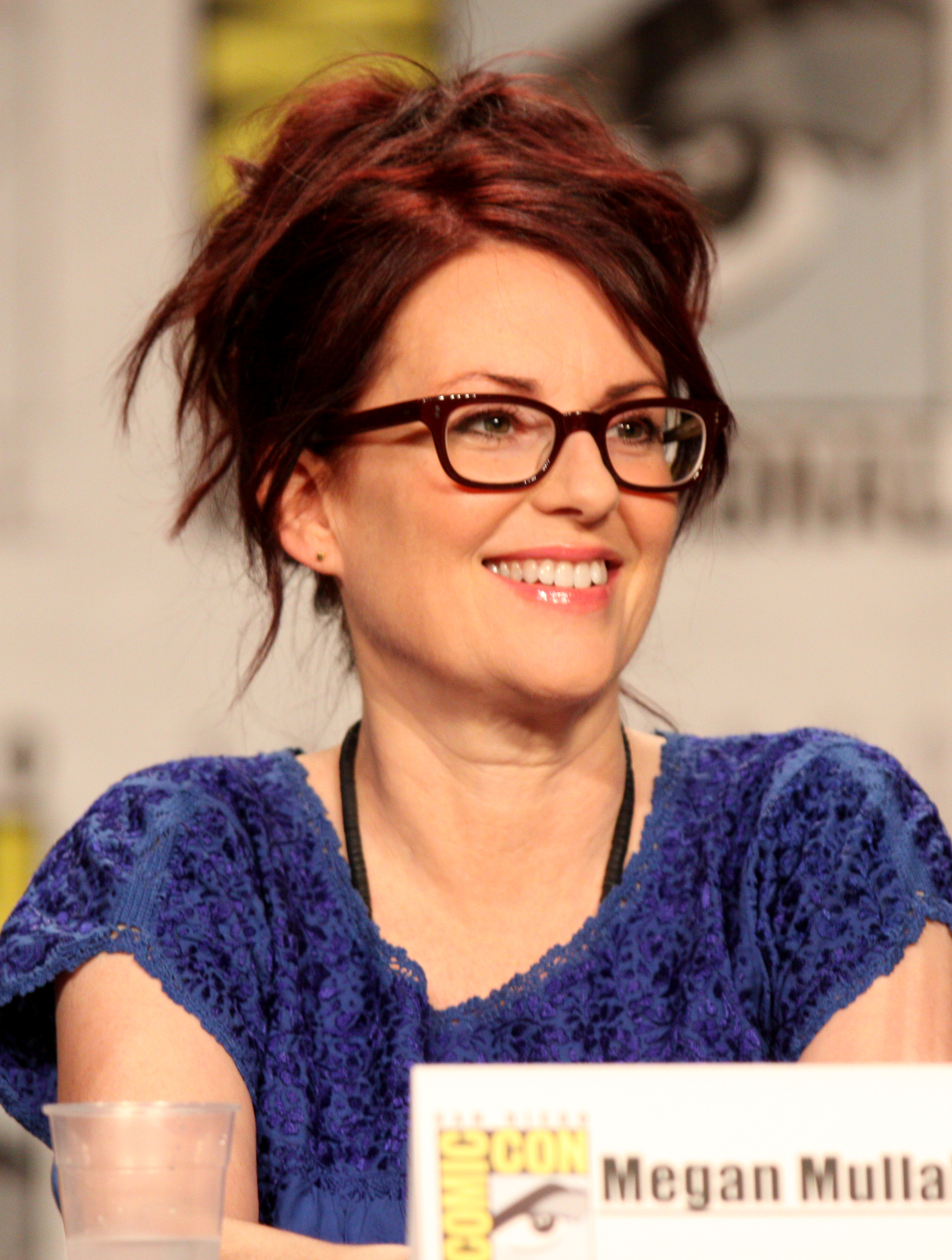
Megan Mullally, Outstanding Performance by a Female Actor in a Comedy Series winner

=== Film ===
Outstanding Performance by a Male Actor in a Leading Role	Outstanding Performance by a Female Actor in a Leading Role
**Russell Crowe – A Beautiful Mind as John Nash**; Kevin Kline – Life as a House as George Monroe; Sean Penn – I Am Sam as Sam Dawson; Denzel Washington – Training Day as Alonzo Harris; Tom Wilkinson – In the Bedroom as Matt Fowler	**Halle Berry – Monster's Ball as Leticia Musgrove**; Jennifer Connelly – A Beautiful Mind as Alicia Nash; Judi Dench – Iris as Iris Murdoch; Sissy Spacek – In the Bedroom as Ruth Fowler; Renée Zellweger – Bridget Jones's Diary as Bridget Jones
Outstanding Performance by a Male Actor in a Supporting Role	Outstanding Performance by a Female Actor in a Supporting Role
**Ian McKellen – The Lord of the Rings: The Fellowship of the Ring as Gandalf the Grey**; Jim Broadbent – Iris as John Bayley; Hayden Christensen – Life as a House as Sam Monroe; Ethan Hawke – Training Day as Jake Hoyt; Ben Kingsley – Sexy Beast as Don Logan	**Helen Mirren – Gosford Park as Mrs. Wilson**; Cate Blanchett – Bandits as Kate Wheeler; Judi Dench – The Shipping News as Agnis Hamm; Cameron Diaz – Vanilla Sky as Julie Gianni; Dakota Fanning – I Am Sam as Lucy Dawson
Outstanding Performance by a Cast in a Motion Picture
**Gosford Park – Eileen Atkins, Bob Balaban, Alan Bates, Charles Dance, Stephen Fry, Michael Gambon, Richard E. Grant, Tom Hollander, Derek Jacobi, Kelly Macdonald, Helen Mirren, Jeremy Northam, Clive Owen, Ryan Phillippe, Kristin Scott Thomas, Maggie Smith, Geraldine Somerville, Sophie Thompson, Emily Watson, and James Wilby**; A Beautiful Mind – Paul Bettany, Jennifer Connelly, Russell Crowe, Adam Goldberg, Jason Gray-Stanford, Ed Harris, Judd Hirsch, Josh Lucas, Austin Pendleton, Christopher Plummer, and Anthony Rapp; In the Bedroom – William Mapother, Sissy Spacek, Nick Stahl, Marisa Tomei, Celia Weston, Tom Wilkinson, and William Wise; The Lord of the Rings: The Fellowship of the Ring – Sean Astin, Sean Bean, Cate Blanchett, Orlando Bloom, Billy Boyd, Ian Holm, Christopher Lee, Ian McKellen, Dominic Monaghan, Viggo Mortensen, John Rhys-Davies, Andy Serkis, Liv Tyler, Hugo Weaving, and Elijah Wood; Moulin Rouge! – Jim Broadbent, Nicole Kidman, John Leguizamo, Ewan McGregor, and Richard Roxburgh

=== Television ===
Outstanding Performance by a Male Actor in a Miniseries or Television Movie	Outstanding Performance by a Female Actor in a Miniseries or Television Movie
**Ben Kingsley – Anne Frank: The Whole Story as Otto Frank**; Alan Alda – Club Land as Willie Walters; Richard Dreyfuss – The Day Reagan Was Shot as Alexander Haig; James Franco – James Dean as James Dean; Gregory Hines – Bojangles as Bill "Bojangles" Robinson	**Judy Davis – Life with Judy Garland: Me and My Shadows as Judy Garland**; Angela Bassett – Ruby's Bucket of Blood as Ruby Delacroix; Anjelica Huston – The Mists of Avalon as Viviane, Lady of the Lake; Sissy Spacek – Midwives as Sibyl Danforth; Emma Thompson – Wit as Vivian Bearing
Outstanding Performance by a Male Actor in a Drama Series	Outstanding Performance by a Female Actor in a Drama Series
**Martin Sheen – The West Wing as Josiah "Jed" Bartlet**; Richard Dreyfuss – The Education of Max Bickford as Max Bickford; Dennis Franz – NYPD Blue as Sgt. Andy Sipowicz; James Gandolfini – The Sopranos as Tony Soprano; Peter Krause – Six Feet Under as Nate Fisher	**Allison Janney – The West Wing as C. J. Cregg**; Lorraine Bracco – The Sopranos as Jennifer Melfi; Stockard Channing – The West Wing as Abigail "Abbey" Bartlet; Tyne Daly – Judging Amy as Maxine Gray; Edie Falco – The Sopranos as Carmela Soprano; Lauren Graham – Gilmore Girls as Lorelai Gilmore
Outstanding Performance by a Male Actor in a Comedy Series	Outstanding Performance by a Female Actor in a Comedy Series
**Sean Hayes – Will & Grace as Jack McFarland**; Peter Boyle – Everybody Loves Raymond as Frank Barone; Kelsey Grammer – Frasier as Frasier Crane; David Hyde Pierce – Frasier as Niles Crane; Ray Romano – Everybody Loves Raymond as Ray Barone	**Megan Mullally – Will & Grace as Karen Walker**; Jennifer Aniston – Friends as Rachel Green; Kim Cattrall – Sex and the City as Samantha Jones; Patricia Heaton – Everybody Loves Raymond as Debra Barone; Sarah Jessica Parker – Sex and the City as Carrie Bradshaw
Outstanding Performance by an Ensemble in a Drama Series
**The West Wing – Stockard Channing, Dulé Hill, Allison Janney, Rob Lowe, Janel Moloney, Richard Schiff, Martin Sheen, John Spencer, and Bradley Whitford**; CSI: Crime Scene Investigation – Gary Dourdan, George Eads, Jorja Fox, Paul Guilfoyle, Robert David Hall, Marg Helgenberger, William Petersen, and Eric Szmanda; Law & Order – Angie Harmon, Jesse L. Martin, S. Epatha Merkerson, Jerry Orbach, Elisabeth Röhm, Sam Waterston, and Dianne Wiest; Six Feet Under – Lauren Ambrose, Frances Conroy, Rachel Griffiths, Michael C. Hall, Peter Krause, Freddy Rodriguez, and Mathew St. Patrick; The Sopranos – Lorraine Bracco, Federico Castelluccio, Dominic Chianese, Drea de Matteo, Edie Falco, James Gandolfini, Robert Iler, Michael Imperioli, Joe Pantoliano, Steve Schirripa, Jamie-Lynn Sigler, Tony Sirico, Aida Turturro, Steven Van Zandt, and John Ventimiglia
Outstanding Performance by an Ensemble in a Comedy Series
**Sex and the City – Kim Cattrall, Kristin Davis, Cynthia Nixon, and Sarah Jessica Parker**; Everybody Loves Raymond – Peter Boyle, Brad Garrett, Patricia Heaton, Doris Roberts, Ray Romano, and Madylin Sweeten; Frasier – Peri Gilpin, Kelsey Grammer, Jane Leeves, John Mahoney, and David Hyde Pierce; Friends – Jennifer Aniston, Courteney Cox Arquette, Lisa Kudrow, Matt LeBlanc, Matthew Perry, and David Schwimmer; Will & Grace – Sean Hayes, Eric McCormack, Debra Messing, Shelley Morrison, and Megan Mullally

=== Screen Actors Guild Life Achievement Award ===
- Edward Asner

== Multiple nominations ==
=== Film ===
Nominations	Film
3	A Beautiful Mind
3	In the Bedroom
2	Gosford Park
2	I Am Sam
2	Iris
2	Life as a House
2	The Lord of the Rings: The Fellowship of the Ring
2	Training Day

=== Television ===
Nominations	Program
4	Everybody Loves Raymond
4	The Sopranos
4	The West Wing
3	Frasier
3	Sex and the City
3	Will & Grace
2	Friends
2	Six Feet Under

== Multiple wins ==
=== Film ===
Wins	Film
2	Gosford Park

=== Television ===
Wins	Program
3	The West Wing
2	Will & Grace

== In Memoriam ==
Performers and members of the Guild who had died the previous year that were honored in the ceremony's In Memoriam tribute:

- Aaliyah
- Imogene Coca
- Perry Como
- Dagmar
- Rosemary DeCamp
- Troy Donahue
- Gloria Foster
- Arlene Francis
- Kathleen Freeman
- David Graf
- Jane Greer
- Anne Haney
- George Harrison
- Nigel Hawthorne
- Eileen Heckart
- Christopher Hewett
- Peggy Lee
- Jack Lemmon
- Whitman Mayo
- Dorothy McGuire
- Jason Miller
- Carroll O'Connor
- Anthony Quinn
- Avery Schreiber
- Ann Sothern
- Kim Stanley
- Guy Stockwell
- Beatrice Straight
- Edward Winter
- Victor Wong
