= John Bayley (writer) =

British literary critic and writer (1925–2015)

John Bayley CBE FBA FRSL
- Born: John Oliver Bayley; 27 March 1925; Lahore, Punjab, British India
- Died: 12 January 2015 (aged 89); Lanzarote, Canary Islands
- Occupations: Writer, literary critic
- Spouses: Iris Murdoch (m. 1956; died 1999) Audi Villiers (m. 2001)

John Oliver Bayley (27 March 1925 – 12 January 2015) was a British academic, literary critic and writer. He was the Warton Professor of English at the University of Oxford from 1974 to 1992. His first marriage was to the novelist and philosopher Iris Murdoch.

Bayley was "acclaimed for his dissections of Goethe and Pushkin as well as of Jane Austen". The "master of all he surveys", he "is the reviewer’s reviewer", excelling where "deep knowledge and logical examination come together"; his criticism "consists of attractively original examinations of subjects", "especially those devoted to poetry and to Russian and central European literature". Sir Frank Kermode, who held the position of King Edward VII Professor of English Literature, University of Cambridge, reviewed Bayley's The Power of Delight: A Lifetime in Literature (Bayley's literary essays from 1962 to 2002) with the title of "The King of Crit".

== Biography ==
Bayley was born in Lahore, British India and educated at Eton, where he studied under G.W. Lyttelton, who also taught Aldous Huxley, J.B.S. Haldane, George Orwell and Cyril Connolly. After leaving Eton, he read for a degree at New College, Oxford, where he subsequently taught for almost fifty years. From 1974 to 1992, he was Warton Professor of English and a Fellow of St. Catherine's College.

Bayley enlisted in the British Army during World War II, serving in the Grenadier Guards where he wound up in postwar Germany. Over the decades, he reviewed often in The New York Review of Books. The choice of these essays and his scholarly articles from 1962 to 2002 were selected by the literary editor of The New Yorker, Leo Carey, and published as The Power of Delight: A Lifetime in Literature. Bayley was also a novelist.

From 1956 until her death in 1999, he was married to the philosopher and novelist Dame Iris Murdoch who said "that her husband was perhaps 'the greatest critic since Coleridge'."

He thought that sex was "inescapably ridiculous". In spite of, or because of, his feelings, his wife had multiple affairs with both men and women, which he occasionally witnessed for himself. In the mid-1990s, Murdoch fell ill with Alzheimer's disease, diagnosed in 1997. Bayley then wrote the book Iris: A Memoir of Iris Murdoch (1998), which was made into the 2001 film Iris by Richard Eyre. In this film, Bayley was portrayed in his early years by Hugh Bonneville, and in his later years by Jim Broadbent. This film also stars Kate Winslet and Dame Judi Dench as Iris Murdoch. After Murdoch's death Bayley married Audi Villers, a family friend. He was appointed CBE in 1999.

John Bayley died on 12 January 2015.

== Portrayal in the film Iris ==
Jim Broadbent won the Academy Award for Best Supporting Actor for his performance as John Bayley in the 2001 film Iris. Hugh Bonneville portrayed the younger John Bayley in this film. For portraying Bayley, Broadbent also won the Golden Globe.

== Bibliography ==
=== Novels ===
- In Another Country (1986)
- Alice (1994)
- The Queer Captain (1995)
- George's Lair (1996)
- The Red Hat (1997)

=== Other works ===
- The Romantic Survival (1953)
- The Characters of Love: A Study in the Literature of Personality (1960)
- Keats and Reality (1969)
- Pushkin: A Comparative Commentary (1971)
- The Uses of Division (1976)
- An Essay on Hardy (1978)
- Shakespeare and Tragedy (1981)
- Selected Essays (1984)
- The Order of Battle at Trafalgar (1987)
- The Short Story: Henry James to Elizabeth Bowen (1988)
- Tolstoy and the Novel (1988)
- Housman's Poems (1992)
- Iris: A Memoir of Iris Murdoch (1998)
- Elegy for Iris: A Memoir (1999)
- Iris and the Friends: A Year of Memories (1999)
- Widower's House (2001)
- Hand Luggage: A Personal Anthology (2001)
- The Power of Delight (2005)
