= Unknown (2011 film) =

Film directed by Jaume Collet-Serra

- Theatrical release poster
- Directed by: Jaume Collet-Serra
- Written by: Oliver Butcher; Stephen Cornwell
- Based on: Out of My Head by Didier Van Cauwelaert
- Produced by: Joel Silver; Leonard Goldberg; Andrew Rona
- Starring: Liam Neeson; Diane Kruger; January Jones; Aidan Quinn; Frank Langella
- Cinematography: Flavio Labiano
- Edited by: Tim Alverson
- Music by: John Ottman; Alexander Rudd
- Production companies: Dark Castle Entertainment; Panda
- Distributed by: Warner Bros. Pictures (International); Kinowelt Filmverleih (Germany); Optimum Releasing (United Kingdom); StudioCanal (France)
- Release dates: 16 February 2011 (Westwood); 18 February 2011 (United States); 2 March 2011 (France); 3 March 2011 (Germany); 4 March 2011 (United Kingdom)
- Running time: 113 minutes
- Countries: United States; Germany; United Kingdom; France
- Language: English
- Budget: $30–40 million
- Box office: $136.1 million

Unknown is a 2011 action thriller film directed by Jaume Collet-Serra and starring Liam Neeson, Diane Kruger, January Jones, Aidan Quinn, Bruno Ganz, and Frank Langella. The film, produced by Joel Silver, Leonard Goldberg and Andrew Rona, is based on the 2003 French novel by Didier Van Cauwelaert published in English as Out of My Head which was adapted as the film's screenplay by Oliver Butcher and Stephen Cornwell. The narrative centers around a professor who wakes up from a four-day long coma and sets out to prove his identity after no one recognizes him, including his own wife, and another man claims to be him.

Released on 18 February 2011, the film received mixed reviews from critics and grossed $136 million against its $30 million budget.

== Plot ==
Martin Harris and his wife Liz arrive in Berlin for a biotechnology summit. At their hotel, Harris realizes he left his briefcase at the airport so takes a taxi to retrieve it.

The taxi is involved in an accident and crashes into the Spree, knocking him unconscious. The driver rescues him but flees the scene. Harris regains consciousness at a hospital after being in a coma for four days.

When Harris returns to the hotel, he finds Liz with another man. She says this man is her husband and declares she does not know Harris. The police are called, and Harris attempts to prove his identity by calling a colleague named Rodney Cole, to no avail.

Harris writes down his schedule for the next day from memory. When he visits the office of Professor Leo Bressler, who he is scheduled to meet, "Dr. Harris" is already there. As Harris attempts to prove his identity, "Harris" provides identification and a family photo, both of which have his face. Overwhelmed by the identity crisis, Harris loses consciousness and awakens back at the hospital. A terrorist named Smith kills Harris's attending nurse, but Harris is able to escape from him.

Harris seeks help from a private investigator and former Stasi agent Ernst Jürgen. He was given the contact via the nurse. Harris's only clues are his father's book on botany and Gina, the taxi driver, an undocumented Bosnian immigrant who has been working at a diner since the crash.

While Harris persuades Gina to help him, Jürgen researches Harris and the biotechnology summit, discovering it is to be attended by Prince Shada of Saudi Arabia. Prince Shada is funding a secret project headed by Bressler, and has survived numerous assassination attempts. Jürgen suspects that the identity theft might be related.

Harris and Gina are attacked in her apartment by Smith and another terrorist, Jones; they escape after Gina kills Smith. Harris finds that Liz has written a series of numbers in his book, numbers that correspond to words found on specific pages. Using his schedule, Harris confronts Liz alone; she tells him that he left his briefcase at the airport.

Meanwhile, Jürgen receives Cole at his office and reveals his findings of a secret terrorist group known as Section 15. Jürgen soon deduces that Cole is a former mercenary and member of the group. Realizing he is there to interrogate and kill him, and with no way of escape, Jürgen takes cyanide to protect Harris.

After retrieving his briefcase, Harris parts ways with Gina. When she sees him kidnapped by Cole and Jones, she steals a taxi and follows them. When Harris awakes, Cole explains that "Martin Harris" is just a cover name created by Harris. His head injury caused him to believe the cover persona was real; when Liz notified Cole of the injury, the other "Harris" was activated as his replacement.

Gina runs over Jones before he can kill Harris, then uses the car to ram Cole's van off a ledge, killing him as well. After Harris finds a hidden compartment in his briefcase containing two Canadian passports, he remembers that he and Liz were in Berlin three months earlier, planting a bomb in Prince Shada's suite.

Now aware of his own role in the assassination plot, Harris seeks to redeem himself by thwarting it. Hotel security immediately arrests Harris and Gina, but he proves his earlier visit. After security is convinced of the bomb's presence, they evacuate the hotel.

Harris realizes that Section 15's target is not Prince Shada, but Bressler, who has developed a genetically modified breed of corn capable of surviving harsh climates. Liz accesses Bressler's laptop and steals the data. With Bressler's death and the theft of his research, billions of dollars would fall into the wrong hands.

Seeing that the assassination attempt has been foiled, Liz tries to disarm the bomb but fails and is killed when it explodes. Harris kills "Harris", the last remaining Section 15 terrorist, so he cannot murder Bressler. As Bressler announces that he is giving his project to the world for free, Harris and Gina—with new identities—board a train together.

== Cast ==
- Liam Neeson as Dr. Martin Harris
- Diane Kruger as Gina
- January Jones as Elizabeth Harris
- Aidan Quinn as Martin B
- Bruno Ganz as Ernst Jürgen, a former Stasi operative
- Frank Langella as Rodney Cole
- Sebastian Koch as Professor Bressler
- Olivier Schneider as Smith
- Stipe Erceg as Jones
- Rainer Bock as Herr Strauss, chief of hotel security
- Mido Hamada as Prince Shada
- Clint Dyer as Biko
- Karl Markovics as Dr. Farge
- Eva Löbau as Nurse Gretchen
- Adnan Maral as a Turkish taxi driver
- Petra Schmidt-Schaller as an immigration officer

== Production ==
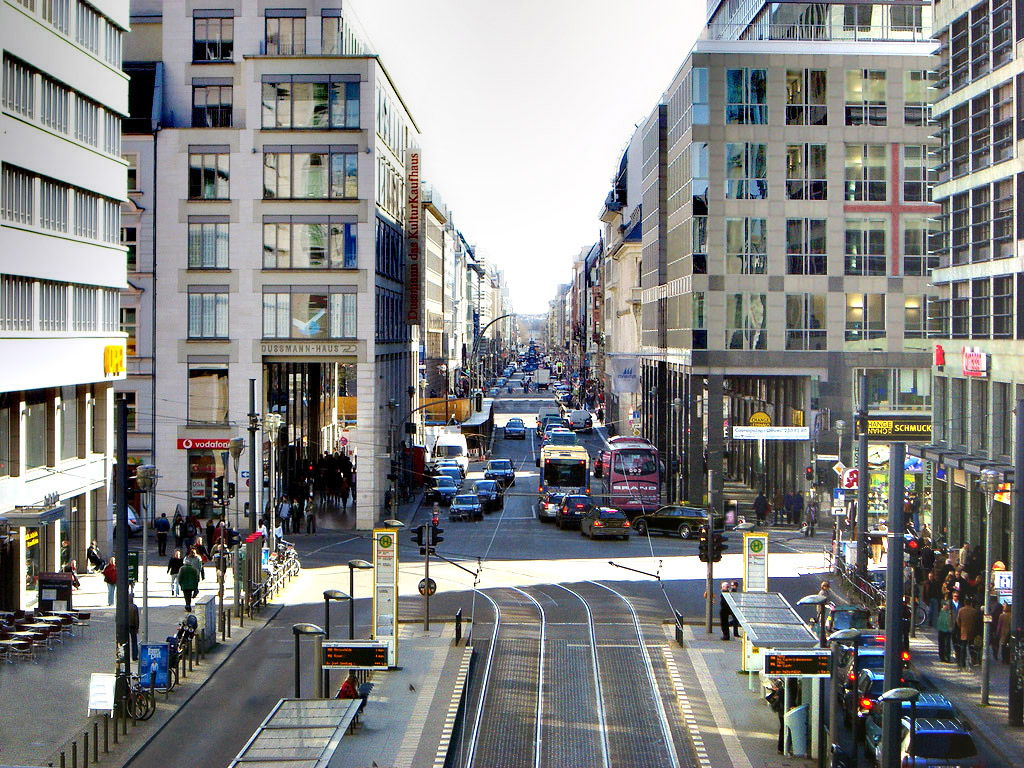
Friedrichstraße, Berlin, where a car chase occurs in the film

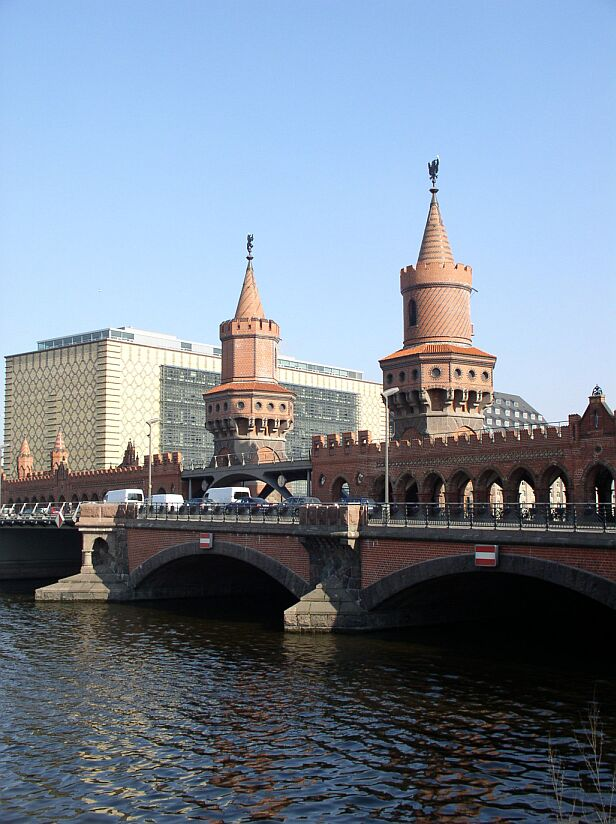
Oberbaumbrücke, from which the taxi plunges into the river

Principal photography took place in early February 2010 in Berlin, Germany, and in the Studio Babelsberg film studios. The bridge the taxi plunges from is the Oberbaumbrücke. The Friedrichstraße was blocked for several nights for the shooting of a car chase. Some of the shooting was done in the Hotel Adlon. Locations include the Neue Nationalgalerie, Berlin Hauptbahnhof, Berlin Friedrichstraße station, Pariser Platz, Museum Island, the Oranienburger Straße in Berlin and the Leipzig/Halle Airport. According to Andrew Rona, the budget was $40 million. Producer Joel Silver's US company Dark Castle Entertainment contributed $30 million. German public film funds supported the production with €4.65 million (more than $6 million). The working title was Unknown White Male.

== Release ==
Unknown was screened out of competition at the 61st Berlin International Film Festival. It was released in the United States on 18 February 2011.

=== Critical response ===
On the review aggregator website Rotten Tomatoes, 56% of 201 critics' reviews are positive, with an average rating of 5.8/10. The website's consensus reads: "Liam Neeson elevates the proceedings considerably, but Unknown is ultimately too derivative – and implausible – to take advantage of its intriguing premise." Metacritic, which uses a weighted average, assigned the film a score of 56 out of 100, based on 38 critics, indicating "mixed or average" reviews. Audiences polled by CinemaScore gave the film an average grade of "B+" on an A+ to F scale.

Richard Roeper gave the film a B+ and wrote, "At times, Unknown stretches plausibility to the near breaking point, but it's so well paced and the performances are so strong and most of the questions are ultimately answered. This is a very solid thriller." Justin Chang of Variety called it "an emotionally and psychologically threadbare exercise".

=== Box office ===
Unknown grossed $63.7 million in North America and $72.4 million in other territories for a worldwide total of $136.1 million.

It finished at number one opening at its first week of release with $21.9 million.

== Television series ==
In June 2021, it was announced that a sequel television series based on the film was in development at TNT. The project was to be produced by Dark Castle Entertainment where Sean Finegan would write the pilot, Karl Gajdusek and Speed Weed would serve as executive producers and show runners, Neeson also would serve as executive producer and Collet-Serra would direct the pilot and executive produce.
