= The Last Battle (Harding book) =

Historical book by Stephen Harding

- Author: Stephen Harding
- Language: English
- Genre: History
- Publisher: Da Capo Press
- Publication date: 2013
- Publication place: United States
- Media type: Hardcover
- Pages: 256
- ISBN: 0-3068-2208-3

The Last Battle: When U.S. and German Soldiers Joined Forces in the Waning Hours of World War II in Europe is a book by the historian Stephen Harding which tells the story of the World War II Battle for Castle Itter.

Published by Da Capo Press, on May 7, 2013, it describes a mixed force of United States Army, German Wehrmacht, and Austrian resistance fighters acting together to prevent the recapture of a number of French VIP prisoners being held at Itter Castle, Austria, by an SS assault party ordered to retake the prison days after Hitler’s suicide.

The fourteen prisoners being held in the facility included two former French Prime Ministers, Paul Reynaud and Édouard Daladier, two former commanders of the French military, the son of famous prime minister Georges Clemenceau, and Marie-Agnès de Gaulle, Resistance member and sister of General Charles de Gaulle.

The story is based on military records, author interviews, personal memoirs, and official German, American, and French histories.

== Movie adaptation ==
It was announced on 7 December 2015 that The Last Battle would be developed into a movie by StudioCanal. The book was adapted by Bryce Zabel who will produce the movie with Andrew Rona and Alex Heineman from The Picture Company. No release date has currently been set.

== See also ==
- 4 Days in May
