= Control (upcoming film) =

Upcoming film by Robert Schwentke

- Directed by: Robert Schwentke
- Screenplay by: Matthew Wilder; Zack Akers; Andrew Baldwin; Robert Schwentke
- Based on: Shipworm by: Zack Akers; Skip Bronkie
- Produced by: Andrew Rona; Alex Heineman
- Starring: James McAvoy; Julianne Moore; Sarah Bolger; Nick Mohammed; Jenna Coleman; Rudi Dharmalingam; Kyle Soller; August Diehl; Martina Gedeck
- Production companies: StudioCanal; The Picture Company
- Countries: France; United States
- Language: English

Control is an upcoming action film directed by Robert Schwentke and starring James McAvoy and Julianne Moore. It is from StudioCanal and The Picture Company, and is an adaptation of the podcast Shipworm.

== Premise ==
A man has an implant in his brain which issues him instructions.

== Cast ==
- James McAvoy as Dr. Conway
- Julianne Moore
- Sarah Bolger
- Nick Mohammed
- Jenna Coleman
- Rudi Dharmalingam
- Kyle Soller
- August Diehl
- Martina Gedeck

== Production ==
The project from StudioCanal and The Picture Company was reported in April 2023 with James McAvoy cast in the lead role and Robert Schwentke as director. It is an adaptation of the podcast Shipworm from Zack Akers and Skip Bronkie. Akers wrote the script with Andrew Baldwin and Bronkie is an executive producer. Andrew Rona and Alex Heineman are producers for The Picture Company. In April 2024, Julianne Moore was reported to have joined the cast.

Principal photography began in Berlin in May 2024, with Sarah Bolger, Nick Mohammed and Jenna Coleman added to the cast.
