= Studio 8 =

Studio 8 can refer to:

- Studio 8 (company), a production company
- Capcom Production Studio 8, a defunct development studio of Capcom USA, Inc.
- Macromedia Studio 8, a software suite
