= North Riding Garages v Butterwick =

- Court: High Court of Justice
- Citation: [1967] 2 QB 56, [1967] 2 WLR 571, [1967] 1 All ER 644

Keywords
- Redundancy

North Riding Garages v Butterwick [1967] 2 QB 56 is a UK labour law case, concerning redundancy.

== Facts ==
Mr Alexander Butterwick had been the car repairs shop manager for North Riding Garages for thirty years in Whitby, Yorkshire. He could not cope with new working methods introduced by the business owners who bought out the company in 1965. This involved more paper work and providing estimates to customers in advance.

== Judgment ==
Lord Parker CJ, Glyn-Jones J and Widgery J in the Divisional Court reversed the Tribunal's finding of redundancy. It held the garage continued to require a workshop manager, though one with different skills.
