= Thomas & Betts Manufacturing Ltd v Harding =

- Court: Court of Appeal of England and Wales
- Citation: [1980] IRLR 255

Keywords
- Redundancy

Thomas & Betts Manufacturing Ltd v Harding [1980] IRLR 255 is a UK labour law case, concerning redundancy.

== Facts ==
Ms Harding was a packer, and also worked on a production line. The production line was closed and she was dismissed for redundancy. She claimed there was still work for packers, and if needed, one who had not worked so long should be dismissed instead, so the dismissal was unfair.

== Judgment ==
Court of Appeal upheld the Tribunal’s decision that the dismissal was unfair.
