= Supermax (film) =

Upcoming American action thriller film

- Directed by: David Gordon Green
- Written by: David Weil; David J. Rosen
- Produced by: Alex Heineman; Andrew Rona; Adam Fishbach
- Starring: Will Smith; AnnaSophia Robb; Jaafar Jackson; Jason Clarke; Melissa Leo
- Production companies: Miramax; The Picture Company; Westbrook Studios
- Distributed by: Amazon MGM Studios
- Country: United States
- Language: English

Supermax is an upcoming American action thriller film directed by David Gordon Green, written by David Weil and David J. Rosen, and starring Will Smith, AnnaSophia Robb, Jaafar Jackson, Jason Clarke, and Melissa Leo.

== Premise ==
Two FBI agents investigate a murder in the world's most secure prison.

== Cast ==
- Will Smith as Rex
- AnnaSophia Robb
- Jaafar Jackson
- Jason Clarke
- Melissa Leo
- Nicholas Alexander Chavez
- Andrés Almeida
- Nathan Phillips as Pietr
- Martin Bats Bradford
- Erika Ringor
- Callan Colley as Brendan
- Rupert Reid as Ted Littleford

== Production ==
In May 2025, Miramax acquired rights to the spec script for Supermax, a high-concept action thriller written by David Weil and David J. Rosen, and to be produced by The Picture Company's Andrew Rona and Alex Heineman. In October 2025, David Gordon Green was announced as the film's director, with production fast-tracked for spring 2026. In May 2026, Will Smith was announced as the film's lead, with Amazon MGM Studios acquiring worldwide distribution rights for around $70 million and filming scheduled to begin in August. AnnaSophia Robb joined the film in July, while Jaafar Jackson and Jason Clarke joined the cast in August. The rest of the cast was announced as filming began later that month in New South Wales, Australia. In promotion for the film, Smith flaunted his new Christian Louboutin sneakers, retailed at $1,090, that his son Jaden gifted him. Melissa Leo joined the cast in September.
