= 4 Days in May =

2011 film

- Poster
- Directed by: Achim von Borries
- Screenplay by: Achim von Borries, Eduard Reznik
- Based on: the work of Dmitry Faust
- Produced by: Stefan Arndt, Aleksei Guskov
- Starring: Paul Wenzel, Aleksei Guskov
- Music by: Thomas Finer
- Release date: 9 August 2011 (Locarno Film Festival)
- Running time: 97 minutes
- Countries: Germany, Ukraine, Russia
- Languages: Russian, German
- Budget: 5.6 million USD

4 days in May (German: Vier Tage im Mai, Ukrainian: «4 дні в травні», romanized: 4 dni v travni) is a war drama film directed by Achim von Borries and starring Paul Wenzel and Aleksei Guskov. It is a German-Russian-Ukrainian co-production. The film was released on August 9, 2011, at the Locarno Film Festival.

The official slogan is: "Sometimes the border goes not between “them” and “us”, but between good and evil".

== Plot ==
It is one of the last days before the capitulation of Nazi Germany in May 1945. The setting is the Baltic coast in Pomerania. A unit of the Soviet Army, comprising seven men and led by a captain nicknamed "Gorynych" ("dragon") (Aleksei Guskov) by his companions, has left for reconnaissance and observation of the movements of the retreating Germans. The group is housed in a large building, a shelter for orphaned girls. A German Army detachment is situated close by, awaiting transport for evacuation by sea to Denmark, where they plan to surrender to the British. Both parties understand that the war is almost over; they do not want to engage each other and choose to wait things out. But resistance is not over for a teenage orphan Peter (Paul Wenzel), who was indoctrinated in the "no surrender" tradition of National Socialism. Soviet intelligence officers disarm him and patiently try to neutralize his youthful aggression.

On May 8, 1945, Victory in Europe Day, a Soviet major who is commander of the division that includes the reconnaissance unit, arrives with Red Army troops. He was drunk on the occasion of Germany's capitulation. The major tries to rape one of the German girls, but the captain disarms him and stops the attempt. Wishing to eliminate witnesses of his indecent behavior, the major said that the enemy, in disguise, infiltrated the building, and began an assault by his unit. The German detachment did not surrender but came to rescue the children. Then they made provisions for the safe withdrawal of the orphans on a fishing launch to Denmark.

== Cast ==
- Paul Wenzel as Peter
- Aleksei Guskov as captain, commander of the reconnaissance
- Ivan Shvedoff as Trubitsin, scout
- Andrew Merzlikin as Gray, the scout
- Sergei Legostaev as Ivanov, a scout
- Grigoriy Dobrygin as Fedyunin
- Merab Ninidze as Major
- Gerald Alexander Held as Colonel Wald
- Martin Brambach as Lt. Wendt
- Angelina Häntsch as Anna
- Petra Kelling as patroness of the shelter

== Reliability ==
Aleksei Guskov, the producer and the lead actor, based the screenplay on a work by Dmitry Faust. The author, telling the story of Marshal of the Soviet Union, K. Moskalenko, described the reported case of German troops coming to the aid of the small Soviet reconnaissance unit. Scouts prevented the drunken major - a tank officer - from raping a German girl. The plausibility of the story was supported by its publication in the prestigious Russian historical illustrated magazine Rodina. However, the same journal contained an article by Boris Sokolov, in which he called into question the authenticity of the political report quoted by Dmitry Faust. Later, other historians argued that the story was totally fictional, unsupported by archival documents. In particular, the Russian historian Alexei Isaev said Faust had actually written about the "brotherhood of the weapon" on the island of Rügen.

== Awards ==
- Special Jury Award: For courage and humanism, and the prize "Golden Boat" in the "Vyborg Account" film festival "Window to Europe"(Vyborg, 2011).

== See also ==
- The Last Battle: When U.S. and German Soldiers Joined Forces in the Waning Hours of World War II in Europe, a book about the Battle for Castle Itter
