= Thomas Wragg & Sons Ltd v Wood =

- Court: Employment Appeal Tribunal
- Citation: [1976] ICR 313

Keywords
- Redundancy

Thomas Wragg & Sons Ltd v Wood [1976] ICR 313 is a UK labour law case, concerning redundancy.

== Facts ==
Mr Wood got six weeks' notice before redundancy. The day before termination was due he got another job offer. He refused it. He did not dispute that it was suitable and made within the statutory time limit. But he argued that he did not decline it unreasonably.

The Tribunal held that Mr Wood was not unreasonable, and therefore entitled to redundancy.

== Judgment ==
Lord McDonald in the Employment Appeal Tribunal held that the Tribunal was right. Mr Wood's reasons were that he had committed himself to another job, that he was wary about future layoffs if he stayed with this employer, and that the offer of alternative employment was late in the day. All these, but especially the third reason, were important, relevant and material, even though the employers were within the statutory time limit for making the offer. The argument that the statute would have said something if this was intended was rejected.
