= Optical Express Ltd v Williams =

UK legal case

- Court: Employment Appeal Tribunal
- Citation: [2007] IRLR 936

Keywords
- Redundancy

Optical Express Ltd v Williams [2007] IRLR 936 is a UK labour law case, concerning redundancy.

== Facts ==
Ms Williams claimed redundancy six weeks into a trial period as manager of an optical store, after the dental clinic which she had previously managed closed. She had agreed to a four-week trial under ERA 1996 section 138 with reservations and asked for confirmation, when she began the trial in the new post, that she could still get redundancy should the new post not work out. But the employers said nothing at the time.

The Tribunal held she was not too late because there was a common law trial period that could be longer than four weeks. The employers had breached the term of mutual trust and confidence by imposing on her the new contract which was unsuitable. Because her rejection was within a reasonable time, she should be considered constructively dismissed under s 136(1)(c) and entitled to redundancy.

== Judgment ==
Burton J held that the Tribunal was wrong and the statutory trial period could not be ignored.
