= Nelson v BBC (No 2) =

- Court: Court of Appeal of England and Wales
- Citation: [1980] ICR 110

Keywords
- Unfair dismissal

Nelson v BBC (No 2) [1980] ICR 110 is a UK labour law case, concerning unfair dismissal and the role of contributory fault.

== Facts ==
Mr Nelson was employed by the BBC working in the Caribbean. In 1974, the BBC decided to reduce the services it provided in the Caribbean and offered Mr Nelson transfer to another role.

Mr Nelson refused any transfer of his employment, apparently in a "bloody minded" way.

== Judgment ==
Brandon LJ held that while Mr Nelson was not "redundant"—the BBC could have found other work for him—and therefore dismissal on the grounds of redundancy was technically unfair, Mr Nelson's behaviour reduced his damages to zero as his behaviour was "perverse or foolish … or … bloody minded."

The Court of Appeal laid out a three-stage test to whether there is contributory fault in an unfair dismissal claim. The test is as follows:

1. Was the employee culpable or blameworthy?
2. Did the employee's actions cause or contribute to the dismissal?
3. Is it just and equitable in the circumstances to reduce the award?

The Court of Appeal applied a "contract test" to the question of redundancy: whether an employee was redundant was to be determined by reference to the terms (explicit or implied) in their employment contract. This, along with the "function test" was subsequently rejected by the House of Lords in Murray v Foyle Meats Ltd.
