= The Commuter (film) =

2018 film by Jaume Collet-Serra

- Theatrical release poster
- Directed by: Jaume Collet-Serra
- Screenplay by: Byron Willinger; Philip de Blasi; Ryan Engle
- Story by: Byron Willinger; Philip de Blasi
- Produced by: Andrew Rona; Alex Heineman
- Starring: Liam Neeson; Vera Farmiga; Patrick Wilson; Jonathan Banks; Sam Neill
- Cinematography: Paul Cameron
- Edited by: Nicolas de Toth
- Music by: Roque Baños
- Production companies: StudioCanal; The Picture Company; Ombra Films
- Distributed by: StudioCanal (United Kingdom, France, Germany, Australia and New Zealand); Lionsgate (United States)
- Release dates: January 8, 2018 (New York City); January 12, 2018 (United States); January 19, 2018 (United Kingdom); January 24, 2018 (France)
- Running time: 105 minutes
- Countries: United States; United Kingdom; France
- Language: English
- Budget: $30 million
- Box office: $119.9 million

The Commuter is a 2018 action thriller film directed by Jaume Collet-Serra and written by Byron Willinger, Philip de Blasi and Ryan Engle. The film stars Liam Neeson, Vera Farmiga, Patrick Wilson, Jonathan Banks, Florence Pugh, and Sam Neill. It follows a man who is unwittingly recruited into a murder conspiracy after meeting a mysterious woman while on his daily train commute.

The film premiered in New York City on January 8, 2018, and was theatrically released in the United States on January 12, 2018, by Lionsgate, and on January 19, 2018, in the United Kingdom by StudioCanal. The film grossed $119 million worldwide and received mixed reviews from critics, who called it similar to Neeson and Collet-Serra's previous film, Non-Stop, but praised Neeson's performance and the genre thrills.

== Plot ==
Michael MacCauley, a former NYPD officer turned insurance agent, takes the same daily train commute on the Hudson Line from Tarrytown to Grand Central Terminal. He is abruptly laid off from his job, endangering his family's financial security. Waiting to reveal his dismissal to his wife and son, he instead confides in Murphy, his ex-partner still on the police force. On the train home, Michael meets a mysterious woman, Joanna, who proposes a "hypothetical" situation: she asks him to locate "Prynne," the alias of an unknown passenger who Joanna claims has a stolen item. Joanna tells Michael that he will find $25,000 in the bathroom and be paid a further $75,000 when his task is done. Alluding to Michael being a former cop, she departs, and he finds the $25,000.

Michael attempts to leave the train with the money, but he is stopped by a young teenager with an envelope containing his wife's wedding ring, which she tells him is a warning. Unable to reach his wife by phone, he discreetly approaches fellow commuter Walt, writing a note on his newspaper to contact the police. Michael leaves Murphy a voicemail describing the situation and receives a call from Joanna threatening him and his family. She tells him the train is rigged with hidden cameras and to look outside, where he sees Walt being pushed in front of a moving bus and killed. Joanna points Michael to a GPS tracker in his jacket to plant on Prynne.

Michael induces a conductor to make random security searches, saying that he has observed suspicious activity by some of the passengers. But when the conductor tries to search a woman's bag, she protests loudly. A man immediately leaves the car, and Michael follows, but the man attacks him, and Michael plants the tracker on him. Murphy calls back and explains that Prynne is a key witness in the supposed suicide of city official Enrique Mendez, leading Michael to realize that Prynne will be killed and that Michael is being set up. In a deserted carriage, Michael discovers the body of the man he planted the tracker on and a badge revealing he was an FBI agent. Joanna calls, chastising Michael for marking the wrong person and warning that another passenger reported his suspicious activities to police, who stop the train to investigate. Michael hides with the corpse underneath the carriage but loses the $25,000.

Sabotaging the train's air conditioning, he forces the remaining passengers into the last carriage and realizes another passenger, Oliver, killed the FBI agent. Oliver reveals that he received the same instructions for $100,000 but with orders to kill Prynne once Michael identified him. They fight, and Michael throws Oliver out of a window, thereby killing him. "Prynne" is revealed to be a 16-year-old girl named Sofia, who is holding incriminating information on powerful people; the agent who Oliver had killed was escorting her to witness protection at the train's final stop.

Joanna calls to force Michael to kill Sofia for the sake of his family, but he refuses, and Joanna detonates explosives to derail the train and kill everyone aboard. Michael saves the passengers by unhooking the final carriage at a curve in the tracks, but a conductor, Sam, is killed. Michael instructs the passengers to block the carriage windows with wet newspapers before a massive police force arrives. Assuming that Michael is holding the train hostage, authorities send Murphy to negotiate with him. Entering the carriage, Murphy unknowingly reveals himself as the rogue cop who killed Enrique, and he and Michael fight hand-to-hand. Michael removes Murphy's electronic ID tag, which identifies him as a "friendly" to the police snipers' thermal vision, resulting in Murphy being mistaken for Michael and shot dead.

Sofia tells the FBI what she knows, and Michael is exonerated by the other passengers while the FBI rescues his family. His former captain admits that Murphy and other corrupt officers had been under investigation and offers Michael his job back. Michael reveals that he kept the incriminating hard drive Sofia gave him. Some time later, Joanna is on a train back from Chicago when Michael confronts her, showing her his detective's badge and preparing to arrest her.

== Cast ==
- Liam Neeson as Michael MacCauley
- Vera Farmiga as Joanna
- Patrick Wilson as Det. Lt. Alex Murphy
- Jonathan Banks as Walt
- Sam Neill as Captain David Hawthorne
- Elizabeth McGovern as Karen MacCauley
- Killian Scott as FBI Agent Dylan
- Shazad Latif as Vince
- Andy Nyman as Tony
- Clara Lago as Eva
- Roland Møller as Jackson
- Florence Pugh as Gwen
- Edward Bluemel as Gwen's Boyfriend
- Dean-Charles Chapman as Danny MacCauley
- Ella-Rae Smith as Sofia
- Nila Aalia as Sherri
- Kobna Holdbrook-Smith as Oliver
- Colin McFarlane as Conductor Sam
- Adam Nagaitis as Conductor Jimmy
- John Alastair as Officer O'Neill
- Kingsley Ben-Adir as Special Agent Garcia
- Damson Idris as Special Agent Denys
- Ben Caplan as Frank
- Letitia Wright as Jules Skateboarder
- Pat Kiernan as Himself

== Production ==
=== Development ===
In January 2010, Olatunde Osunsanmi boarded the action-thriller film as director for the production company Gold Circle Films, with a screenplay written by Byron Willinger and Philip de Blasi. More than a year later, in August 2011, Julian Jarrold was reported to be directing the film instead. In January 2016, Jaume Collet-Serra closed a deal to direct the film, marking his fourth collaboration with Neeson, and also executive produced through Ombra Films, with partner Juan Sola. The film was produced by StudioCanal and The Picture Company.

=== Casting ===
In September 2015, it was announced that Liam Neeson would star in the film. In June 2016, Vera Farmiga joined, in a role described as "a mysterious woman who boards a commuter train and proposes an enticing opportunity to Neeson's character, one that has dire circumstances if he accepts." The project marks the second working collaboration between Farmiga and Collet-Serra, after 2009's psychological thriller Orphan. On July 13, Sam Neill, Elizabeth McGovern, and Jonathan Banks were added to the principal cast, and in August 2016, Kobna Holdbrook-Smith joined in an undisclosed role. The same month, Patrick Wilson joined the cast as a trusted friend of Neeson's character.

=== Filming ===
Principal photography began on July 25, 2016, at Pinewood Studios in Buckinghamshire, England, and continued in New York City. Neeson and McGovern were spotted on the set of the film at Worplesdon railway station in Surrey on September 18, 2016.

== Music ==
In May 2017, it was reported that Roque Baños would compose the film's score. Varèse Sarabande released the soundtrack album digitally in January 2018, with a physical release following on February 9, 2018.

All music composed by Roque Baños.

The Commuter (Original Motion Picture Soundtrack)
No.	Title	Length
1.	"A Commuter's Trip"	5:03
2.	"Back Home Down"	4:35
3.	"One Little Thing"	3:18
4.	"They Are Watching You"	2:54
5.	"Murdered for Help"	4:11
6.	"Zone 7 Tickets"	4:22
7.	"A Suspicious Man"	2:03
8.	"The Seek Starts"	3:46
9.	"A Beautiful Family"	4:18
10.	"Moving Vagons"	4:35
11.	"Do Not Stop the Train"	4:03
12.	"Finding the Witness"	4:33
13.	"The Train Wreck"	4:37
14.	"I Won't Let Them Hurt You"	9:04
15.	"Who Is Prynne?"	5:43
16.	"The End of the Line"	5:01
Total length:		72:00

== Release ==
In November 2015, Lionsgate pre-bought the domestic distribution rights to the film, in a deal with StudioCanal. The Commuter was originally scheduled for release in the United States on October 13, 2017, and was pushed back to January 12, 2018. The film was released in the United Kingdom on October 20, 2017, by StudioCanal, and was also pushed back to January 19, 2018, in accordance with the U.S. rescheduling.

== Reception ==
=== Box office ===
The Commuter grossed $36.3 million in the United States and Canada, and $83.6 million in other territories, for a worldwide total of $119.9 million.

In the United States and Canada, The Commuter was released alongside the openings of Proud Mary and Paddington 2, and the wide expansion of The Post, and was projected to gross $12–14 million from 2,892 theaters in its opening weekend. It made $4.5 million on its first day and $13.7 million over the weekend, on par with previous Neeson-Collet-Serra collaborations, finishing third at the box office behind holdover Jumanji: Welcome to the Jungle and The Post. It made $6.6 million in its second weekend, dropping 51.8% and finishing 7th.

Internationally, the film debuted at number two in Germany with $2.6 million. It went on to gross a total of $6.7 million in the country, the biggest market outside the US, as well as $5.6 million in the UK, $5.0 million in France and $2.6 million in Australia.

=== Critical response ===
On review aggregator website Rotten Tomatoes, the film has an approval rating of 55% based on 218 reviews, with an average rating of 5.4/10. The site's critics consensus reads, "The Commuter's cast is better than its workmanlike script – which helps make this reasonably diverting Liam Neeson action thriller worth the price of a matinee ticket or rental, if not a full-price ticket." Metacritic assigned the film a weighted average score of 56 out of 100, based on 44 critics, indicating "mixed or average reviews". Audiences polled by CinemaScore gave the film an average grade of "B" on an A+ to F scale. Most fans rated the film higher than critics, with many of them praising the cast performances, the mystery elements, and the suspense.
