= Richmond Precision Engineering Ltd v Pearce =

- Court: Employment Appeal Tribunal
- Citation: [1985] IRLR 179

Keywords
- Redundancy

Richmond Precision Engineering Ltd v Pearce [1985] IRLR 179 is a UK labour law case, concerning redundancy.

== Facts ==
Mr Pearce was offered a new contract with the company that had bought his employer's business. Pay was lower, hours were more, holidays were reduced and the occupational pension and fringe benefits were gone. He rejected the offer and claimed unfair dismissal.

The Tribunal upheld Mr Pearce's unfair dismissal claim, and Richmond Precision Engineering appealed.

== Judgment ==
Beldam J in the EAT overturned the Tribunal. The test was whether a reasonable employer could have offered the same terms in the circumstances, including ones disadvantageous or advantageous to both parties. The employee being worse off was not a sufficient reason.

Merely because there are disadvantages to the employee, it does not, by any means, follow that the employer has acted unreasonably in treating his failure to accept the terms which they have offered as a reason for dismissal.

== See also ==
- UK labour law
