= High Table Ltd v Horst =

- Court: Court of Appeal of England and Wales
- Citations: [1997] EWCA Civ 2000, [1998] ICR 409

Keywords
- Redundancy

High Table Ltd v Horst [1997] EWCA Civ 2000 is a UK labour law case, concerning redundancy in English Law in the Court of Appeal (England and Wales), the highest court within the Senior Courts of England and Wales, and second only to the Supreme Court of the United Kingdom.

== Facts ==
Mrs Christine Horst and two other employees claimed unfair dismissal after being told they were redundant, and failing applications for other positions with High Table Ltd. High Table Ltd. argued they were redundant because their workplace, which was factually always from 10am to 4pm at City firm Hill Samuel, no longer needed their ‘silver service’ waitressing after the supply contract was renegotiated the previous year. She argued that because the staff handbook contained a flexibility clause that said she could be transferred ‘within reasonable daily travelling distance’ where possible so she could not be counted as redundant.

The Tribunal held that she was redundant, and the employers had not acted unfairly. She appealed, arguing that there had been no reduction in the requirement for employees, because the mobility clause entailed her working anywhere in the City. Therefore her employer had made no redundancies available.

== Judgment ==
Peter Gibson LJ held that she was redundant because for the purpose of redundancy her place of work was Hill Samuel, not the City as a whole. He quoted Bass Leisure Ltd v Thomas for the proposition that under ERA 1996 section 139 the place of work ‘is to be established by factual enquiry, taking into account the employee’s fixed or changing place or places of work and any contractual terms which go to evidence or define the place of employment and its extent, but not those (if any) which make provision for the employee to be transferred to another.’

If an employee has worked in only one location under his contract of employment for the purposes of the employer’s business it defies common sense to widen the extent of the place where he was so employed merely because of the existence of a mobility clause… it cannot be right to let the contract be the sole determinant, regardless of where the employee actually worked for the employer.
