= Maxam =

Maxam may refer to:

- Maxam (surname)
- Maxam Explosives, a company based in Madrid
- Maxam–Gilbert sequencing, a method of DNA sequencing
- PCL-Maxam, a.k.a. PCL Construction, a group of construction companies
- Williams v Compair Maxam Ltd, a British labour law case
- MaXaM Entertainment, related to Westinghouse Broadcasting
- Maxam, a fictional Marvel Comics character
