= Alpha (2018 film) =

2018 film by Albert Hughes

- Theatrical release poster
- Directed by: Albert Hughes
- Screenplay by: Daniele Sebastian Wiedenhaupt
- Story by: Albert Hughes
- Produced by: Albert Hughes; Andrew Rona
- Starring: Kodi Smit-McPhee; Jóhannes Haukur Jóhannesson
- Cinematography: Martin Gschlacht
- Edited by: Sandra Granovsky
- Music by: Michael Stearns; Joseph S. DeBeasi
- Production companies: Columbia Pictures; Studio 8; The Picture Company
- Distributed by: Sony Pictures Releasing
- Release date: August 17, 2018
- Running time: 96 minutes
- Country: United States
- Language: Fictional language
- Budget: $51 million
- Box office: $99.6 million

Alpha is a 2018 American prehistoric adventure film directed by Albert Hughes and written by Daniele Sebastian Wiedenhaupt, from a story by Hughes. The film stars Kodi Smit-McPhee as a young hunter who encounters and befriends an injured wolf during the last ice age, with Jóhannes Haukur Jóhannesson as his father. The wolf Alpha is played by Chuck, a Czechoslovakian Wolfdog.

Principal photography began in February 2016 in Canada and lasted through that April. The film was delayed several times, before being released in the United States on August 17, 2018, by Sony Pictures Releasing. It grossed over $99 million worldwide and received generally favorable reviews from critics, who praised the performances and cinematography.

== Plot ==
In Upper Paleolithic Europe 20,000 years ago, a small tribe of hunter-gatherers prepare for a hunting expedition to hunt for the coming winter's food. Tau, its chief, trains his teenage son Keda, allowing him and Keda's friend Kappa to join the hunting party. His wife Rho worries that Keda is not ready, but Tau believes he is and the hunters set out.

Tau tests Keda by having him kill a wild boar they've caught, but Keda refuses. One night, the party's fire draws the attention of a large lion, which lunges through their circle, snatching Kappa before anyone can do anything. Hearing the fatal struggle in the darkness, the tribe gives him up for dead. Kappa is given a memorial service in the form of a cairn to symbolize the passing of one's spirit to the afterlife. After that, a wolf howl is heard, and Tau tells Keda that the wolf's name is Alpha, and he is the leader of his clan.

The hunters eventually reach a herd of steppe bison, which they attempt to stampede from a cliff with relative success. Amidst the chaos, a bull rushes towards Keda and tosses him over the edge, leaving him gripping the rough cliff edge with his hand. Keda’s grip breaks and he plummets to a further ledge where he appears to break his leg and is knocked unconscious. Tau attempts to climb down to him, but he is stopped by fellow hunter Sigma who assures him in good faith that Keda is dead and there would be no way to reach him anyway. The tribe leaves and Tau performs another funeral ritual, stricken with grief.

Keda is awoken by a vulture who mistakes him for dead. He kills the bird and tries to climb the rest of the way down the cliff. A sudden heavy rainfall causes the ravine below to flood. Keda sees this, but is reluctant to jump off and hope the water will break his fall. He slips off the ledge anyway, and he survives the fall. Keda splints his injured foot before returning to the top of the cliff. Seeing the memorial cairn left by his tribe, he realizes that he must travel back to the village by himself.

Keda is later attacked and chased by a pack of ferocious wolves, but escapes up a tree and wounds one of the pack members, which the others leave behind. Keda takes pity on it and cares for its injury. Gradually gaining the wolf's trust, he gives it food and water, establishing himself as dominant by feeding himself first. He sets out for the village without the wolf, but it follows him. Their relationship grows, and they learn to hunt animals together.

One night, they are approached menacingly by a pack of wolves. Upon seeing Alpha, who steps forward to greet them, they recognize Keda's companion. The pack runs off, and with Keda's blessing, Alpha joins them. Keda continues his journey alone as the season changes into winter. On a frozen lake, he encounters a pack of wolves feeding on a carcass. Recognizing Alpha, he runs to them, but the ice breaks and he falls through. Alpha helps rescue him and they are reunited.

Continuing the journey together, they find a man who has frozen to death outside his tent and scavenge a bow and a single arrow from his body. Later, in the midst of a blizzard, they take refuge from a pack of cave hyenas inside a cave. However, inside another lion confronts and attacks them, causing Alpha to violently fight the animal. Keda saves Alpha by using the bow and arrow he stole from the dead man, although Alpha is now badly wounded because of the fight and travels with difficulty. Meanwhile, an equally injured Keda begins to cough up blood. When Alpha finally cannot walk, Keda carries the wolf.

Keda eventually finds his village although nearly passing out from exhaustion, and he reunites with his shocked but relieved parents who are amazed and proud of him. As the village healer tends to both Keda and Alpha's wounds, Alpha delivers a litter of puppies much to Keda's surprise, as Alpha is revealed to be female. Alpha and her pups are formally welcomed into the tribe and grow up in the care of Alpha and Keda. The final image of the film shows the tribe and their domesticated wolves hunting together.

== Cast ==
- Kodi Smit-McPhee as Keda
- Jóhannes Haukur Jóhannesson as Tau
- Chuck as Alpha
- Natassia Malthe as Rho
- Marcin Kowalczyk as Sigma
- Leonor Varela as Shaman
- Jens Hultén as Xi
- Mercedes de la Zerda as Nu
- Spencer Bogaert as Kappa
- Morgan Freeman as Narrator (in the cut of the film released in the United Kingdom and Ireland; as released in the U.S. Morgan Freeman has no role and there is no voice-over narration)

== Production ==
The film was first announced in September 2015 as The Solutrean, with Albert Hughes as director, produced by Studio 8. The film uses the IMAX 3D format. Kodi Smit-McPhee was confirmed as its star in November 2015, and other casting was finalized the following February.

The film's dialogue is in constructed languages ('conlangs') created by Christine Schreyer, an anthropology professor at UBC Okanagan. The main language, which Schreyer calls Beama and is spoken in two dialects, was inspired by Proto-Nostratic, Proto-Eurasiatic, and Proto-Dené–Caucasian.

Filming took place in Drumheller, Burnaby, and Vancouver, where a large set was built in Boundary Road near East Kent Avenue. Filming in Vancouver took place from February to May 2016, and at Dinosaur Provincial Park near Patricia, Alberta in April 2016, and in Iceland.

The production was investigated after five Alberta bison were allegedly killed in the making of the film. Following an investigation, the American Humane Association denied its "No Animals Were Harmed" end-credit certification to the production. Two days before the film's release, PETA called for a boycott of the film.

== Release ==
In June 2017, the film's title was changed from The Solutrean to Alpha. Solutrean was an Upper Palaeolithic flint tool making style in Western Europe. The film was originally set for a release date of September 15, 2017, but it was pushed back from its original release date of September 15, 2017 to March 2, 2018. In December 2017, it was again pushed back, this time from March 2, 2018, to September 14, 2018. In April 2018, the release date was moved up from September 14, 2018, to August 17, 2018.

== Home video release ==
Alpha was released on DVD and Blu-ray on November 13, 2018. The home video release includes both the theatrical release of the film as well as a shorter director's cut. The home video release also includes deleted scenes with optional commentary by Albert Hughes, a director's commentary, and featurettes.

== Reception ==
=== Box office ===
Alpha grossed $35.9 million in the United States and Canada, and $62.3 million in other territories, for a total worldwide gross of $98.2 million, against a production budget of $51 million.

In the United States and Canada, Alpha was released alongside Mile 22, and was projected to gross $7–9 million from 2,719 theaters in its opening weekend. It made $3.4 million on its first day, including $525,000 from Thursday night previews at 2,303 theaters. It went on to debut to $10.3 million, finishing fifth at the box office. In its second weekend the film dropped to seventh place, making $5.6 million.

=== Critical response ===
On review aggregator Rotten Tomatoes, Alpha holds an approval rating of 80% based on 133 reviews, with an average rating of 6.5/10. The website's critical consensus reads, "Well-acted and beautifully filmed, Alpha offers a canine-assisted epic adventure that blends rousing action with an extra helping of canine charm." On Metacritic, which assigns a normalized rating to reviews, the film has a weighted average score of 63 out of 100, based on 26 critics, indicating "generally favorable" reviews. Audiences polled by CinemaScore gave the film an average grade of "B+" on an A+ to F scale. Critics noted that while the narrative follows familiar survival and adventure conventions, the film’s visual presentation and relationship between its characters contributed to its overall appeal.

== See also ==
- List of adventure films of the 2010s
