= Got Me Singing =

Single by Jaafar Jackson
- Released: 28 June 2019
- Recorded: 2019
- Genre: R&B; pop
- Length: 3:42
- Label: Jusic Group
- Songwriters: Jaafar Jackson; Indiigo
- Composer: Pablo D’Yvoire
- Producers: Hardy Indiigo; Jaafar Jackson

Jaafar Jackson singles chronology
"Got Me Singing" (2019)	"Confused" (2020)

Music video
- "Got Me Singing" on YouTube

"Got Me Singing" is the debut single by American singer Jaafar Jackson. It was released on June 28, 2019, with an accompanying music video filmed in Rio de Janeiro, Brazil.

The song was produced by Hardy Indiigo and released through Jusic Group, Inc. The song served as the lead single to his planned debut album Famous.

== Background ==
"Got Me Singing" is the debut single by American singer Jaafar Jackson and the lead single from his planned debut album, Famous. The track was released as his first official single, marking the beginning of his solo recording career and serving as his formal introduction as a recording artist.

The song was produced by Hardy Indiigo and recorded as a contemporary R&B and pop-influenced track with rhythmic and dance-oriented elements. Its composition reflects an early effort to establish Jackson’s individual musical direction within mainstream popular music frameworks.

== Composition ==
"Got Me Singing" originated from a drum pattern, which served as the foundation for the track. Jackson built upon it by adding keyboard chords, followed by vocal melodies recorded in the studio. The remaining elements were constructed around these components until the song was complete. Jackson has cited personal experiences, travel, film, and relationships as sources of creative inspiration, describing the songwriting process as open-ended.

== Music video ==
The music video for "Got Me Singing" was released on June 28, 2019, directed by Marcos Mello Cavallaria. It was filmed primarily in the Vidigal favela of Rio de Janeiro, Brazil, with additional footage capturing the surrounding urban and hillside environments of the city.

The video features Jaafar Jackson performing alongside dancers across various outdoor locations, including rooftops and street-level settings. The production centers on choreography and physical interpretation of the music. Jackson's performance functions as both vocal and dance-driven, with movement serving as a primary mode of expression throughout. Choreographer Norman Shay, who contributed to the production, introduced Jackson to passinho a dance style associated with Rio de Janeiro's funk music scene through Brazilian dance references. These influences shaped the overall choreographic direction of the video, with the creative team incorporating elements of passinho to complement the song's rhythmic structure and Brazilian-inflected soundscape.

The selection of Vidigal as a filming location was a deliberate creative decision, intended to situate the visual presentation within the broader context of Brazilian street culture and the dance traditions connected to Rio's funk.

== Credits and personnel ==
Credits are adapted from Apple music.

- Jaafar Jackson – lead and background vocals, songwriter, lyricist, producer
- Indiigo – producer, songwriter, mixing engineer
- Barrington Hall – mixing engineer
- Pablo D'Yvoire – arranger
- Christal Jerez – recording engineer
