= Safeway Stores plc v Burrell =

UK legal case

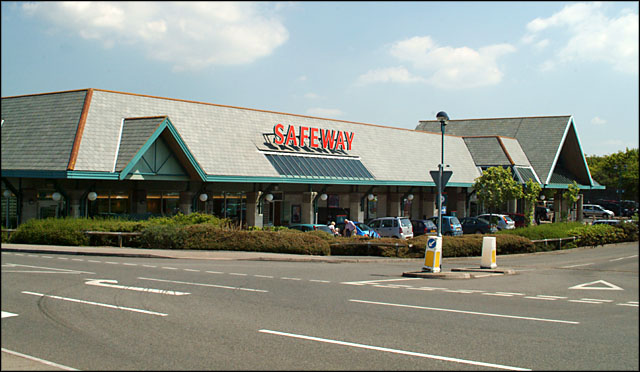
- Court: Employment Appeal Tribunal
- Citation: [1997] ICR 523, [1997] IRLR 200, [1997] CLY 2249

Keywords
- Redundancy

Safeway Stores plc v Burrell [1997] ICR 523 is a UK labour law case, concerning redundancy.

== Facts ==
Safeway Stores plc (now owned by Morrisons) wanted to de-layer and reorganise its departments under its ‘Safeway 2000’ plan. Mr Burrell was a petrol station manager at the Penzance, Cornwall, supermarket. The petrol station manager post would be replaced by a petrol station controller who got paid less. The work was much the same. The former job description carried some management responsibility but Mr Burrell had not in practice performed them. Mr Burrell did not apply for the new post and got redundancy. He then claimed unfair dismissal. The Tribunal held the employers had not demonstrated Mr Burrell was redundant, because the new job involved the same work as before.

== Judgment ==
Peter Clark J held the Tribunal had used the wrong test for redundancy as understood from ERA 1996 section 139(1)(b). The right one is to ask (1) whether the employer’s need for employees had diminished and (2) whether the dismissal was caused by the diminution. So the case was remitted to be reheard. He noted that one should concentrate on the diminution of employees, not of work, referring to Carry All Motors Ltd v Pennington. Furthermore, a business reorganisation is interesting factual background, but its fact does not answer the two stage question of redundancy.

The contract versus function test debate is predicated on a misreading of both the statute and the cases of Nelson and Cowen v Haden Ltd… the applicant/employee’s terms and conditions of employment are irrelevant to the questions raised by the statute.
