= Amend: The Fight for America =

2021 American docuseries

- Genre: Documentary
- Directed by: Reinaldo Marcus Green
- Starring: Will Smith; Bryan Stevenson; Larry Wilmore
- Composer: Osei Essed
- Country of origin: United States
- Original language: English
- No. of seasons: 1
- No. of episodes: 6

Production
- Executive producers: Will Smith; Terence Carter; Jonna McLaughlin; Jamal M. Watson; Robe Imbriano; Larry Wilmore; Tom Yellin; Angus Wall; Jana Babatunde-Bey
- Producers: Christine Turner; Terry Leonard; Juan Mejia Botero; Jennifer Sofio Hall; Stephanie Meurer
- Running time: 56–62 minutes
- Production companies: Westbrook Studios; MakeMake Entertainment; The Documentary Group; Wilmore Films

Original release
- Network: Netflix
- Release: February 17, 2021

Amend: The Fight for America is a 2021 docuseries starring Will Smith, Bryan Stevenson and Larry Wilmore. It covers the legacy of the 14th Amendment to the United States Constitution and explores the history of discrimination and activism for equality in the United States.

== Cast ==
- Will Smith
- Bryan Stevenson
- Larry Wilmore
- Samira Wiley
- Bobby Cannavale
- Laverne Cox
- Algee Smith
- Yara Shahidi
- Graham Greene
- Randall Park
- Lena Waithe
- Hannah Gadsby
- Mahershala Ali
- Sterling K. Brown
- Joseph Gordon-Levitt
- Joshua Jackson
- Samuel L. Jackson
- Aja Naomi King
- Diane Lane
- Pedro Pascal
- Courtney B. Vance
- Daveed Diggs
- Rafael Casal

== Episodes ==
No.	Title	Original release date
1	"Citizen"	February 17, 2021
Frederick Douglass, abolition of slavery in the United States and ratification of the 14th amendment
2	"Resistance"	February 17, 2021
Rise of Jim Crow and Lost Cause ideologies post-Reconstruction; nadir of American race relations
3	"Wait"	February 17, 2021
Martin Luther King and the civil rights movement
4	"Control"	February 17, 2021
Second-wave feminism and women's liberation movement
5	"Love"	February 17, 2021
LGBT rights and same-sex marriage activism, Obergefell v. Hodges
6	"Promise"	February 17, 2021
Immigration to the United States, hope, xenophobia and systemic discrimination faced

== Release ==
Amend: The Fight for America was released on February 17, 2021, on Netflix.
