= Westbrook (company) =

American entertainment company

Westbrook Inc.
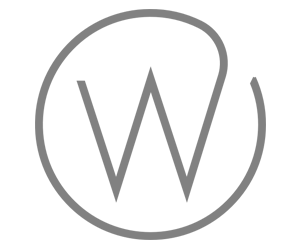
- Logo used since 2019
- Type: Private
- Industry: Entertainment
- Founded: July 10, 2019; 7 years ago
- Founders: Will Smith; Jada Pinkett Smith; Miguel Melendez; Kosaku Yada
- Headquarters: Los Angeles, California, United States
- Key people: Kosaku Yada (CEO); Denise Bailey-Castro (CFO); Terence Carter (President of Television)
- Products: Motion Picture, Television Production
- Divisions: Film; Television; Entertainment Marketing
- Subsidiaries: Overbrook Entertainment; Red Table Talk Enterprises; Westbrook Studios; Westbrook Media; Good Goods
- Website: www.westbrookinc.com

Westbrook Inc. is an American multimedia and entertainment company founded by actor Will Smith and his separated wife, actress Jada Pinkett Smith. The company was founded in 2019, to create and distribute media content. As of 2022, the company is headquartered in Los Angeles, California.

== History ==
In August 2021, the company signed a first-look deal with National Geographic to produce unscripted projects in the areas of adventure, exploration, travel, and science. Projects resulting from this deal include Welcome to Earth (2021) and Pole to Pole (2026).

In November 2021 Westbrook premiered its debut film, King Richard, which garnered six nominations at the 94th Academy Awards (including Best Picture, a first for Westbrook) and four nominations at the 79th Golden Globe Awards, including "Best Motion Picture – Drama," and won "Best Actor - Motion Picture Drama" for Smith.

In January 2022, Candle Media announced its strategic minority investment in Westbrook, as Westbrook concurrently marked its first international expansion and acquired Telepool, a German Film and Television distribution sales company.

In May 2024, Westbrook Inc. announced the sale of Telepool to Vuelta Group. Telepool was subsequently merged with Vuelta Group's existing German producer and distributor, SquareOne Entertainment.

Westbrook Racing was founded in May 2024 and joined the UIM E1 World Championship, an all-electric powerboat racing series, for its inaugural season. The team was co-founded by actor Will Smith alongside investors Leonardo Maria Del Vecchio and Alshair Fiyaz. It competes alongside other team owners in the series including Tom Brady, Rafael Nadal, and LeBron James. Drivers Lucas Ordóñez and Sara Price made their debut at the Venice Grand Prix in May 2024, and the team secured race victories at the Lake Como Grand Prix in 2024 and 2026. In 2026, Westbrook Racing announced Visit Angola as its title partner. The team and the series have stated a commitment to promoting sustainable marine mobility and advancing electric racing technologies.

In July 2025, Westbrook Inc. entered a strategic collaboration with Studio Azuki, a U.S.-based animation venture formed by the NFT brand Azuki, Japanese publisher Comisma Inc., and animation house Xenotoon Inc.

In September 2025, Westbrook Studios secured a multi-picture first-look deal with Paramount Pictures. The agreement includes a commitment to developing and producing globally-focused, IP-based, theatrical films, with Will Smith attached to star in certain franchise-starting projects. Initial titles announced under the deal include Sugar Bandits (an adaptation of the Chuck Hogan novel), Devils in Exile and Rabbit Hole, written by Jon Spaihts.

In November 2025, Peacock premiered the fourth and final season of Bel-Air, a reimagining of the sitcom The Fresh Prince of Bel-Air. The series was Peacock's longest-running original scripted program, following an initial two-season order in 2020. Bel-Air set viewership records as its most-streamed original series. The series finale featured a cameo by Will Smith, who appeared in a scene with Jabari Banks.

== Filmography ==
=== Films ===
Year	Title	Director	Distributor	Notes
2021	King Richard	Reinaldo Marcus Green	Warner Bros. Pictures	Co-production with Star Thrower Entertainment
2022	Emancipation	Antoine Fuqua	Apple TV+	Co-production with Apple Studios, McFarland Entertainment, Escape Artists and Apple Original Films.
2024	Bad Boys: Ride or Die	Adil & Bilall	Sony Pictures Releasing	Co-production with Columbia Pictures, 2.0 Entertainment and Don Simpson/Jerry Bruckheimer Films
2025	Debutantes	Contessa Gayles	Comcast Xfinity Black Experience	Co-production with BET Studios, NBC News; 2024 Tribeca FF premiere
2025	Good Shot	Joris Debeij		Co-production with Religion of Sports, RTG, Unanimous Media, Iconoclast; 2025 ABFF premiere
2026	Full Circle: The First All-Black Everest Ascent	Rolake Bamgbose and Justice A. Whitaker		Co-production with Westbrook Studios, REI Co-op Studios and Little Walnut Productions; 2026 Tribeca FF premiere
2027	Supermax	David Gordon Green	Amazon MGM Studios	Co-production with Miramax and The Picture Company

=== Television ===
Years	Title	Creator	Network	Notes
2018
2018	One Strange Rock	N/A	National Geographic	Co-production with National Geographic
2018-2022	Red Table Talk	N/A	Facebook Watch	Co-production with Very Tall Productions
2018–2025	Cobra Kai	Josh Heald; Jon Hurwitz; Hayden Schlossberg	YouTube Red (season 1); YouTube Premium (season 2); Netflix (seasons 3–6)	Continued from Overbrook Entertainment; co-production with Hurwitz & Schlossberg Productions (seasons 1–2), Heald Productions (season 2), Counterbalance Entertainment (seasons 3–6) and Sony Pictures Television
2020–2021	Red Table Talk: The Estefans	N/A	Facebook Watch	N/A
2021	Welcome to Earth	N/A	Disney+	Co-production with National Geographic Partners
2021	Amend: The Fight for America	N/A	Netflix	
2022–2025	Bel-Air	Andy Borowitz; Susan Borowitz	Peacock	co-production with Arbolada Roads, Ra Shines Inc., Cooper Films, The 51, and Universal Television
2022	Women of the Movement	Marissa Jo Cerar	ABC	Co-production with Two Drifters, Roc Nation, and Kapital Entertainment
2022	This Joka	N/A	The Roku Channel	Co-production with Topgolf Studios
2023	African Queens: Njinga	Peres Owino, NneNne Iwuji	Netflix	Co-production with Nutopia
2023	African Queens: Queen Cleopatra	N/A	Netflix	Co-production with Nutopia
2026	Pole to Pole	N/A	Disney+	Co-production with National Geographic, Nutopia

== Awards ==
Year	Award	Category	Nominee(s)	Result
2021	Daytime Emmy Awards	Outstanding Informative Talk Show	Red Table Talk	Won
2022	Daytime Emmy Awards	Outstanding Hairstyling	Red Table Talk: The Estefans	Nominated
2022	Golden Globe Awards	Best Motion Picture – Drama	King Richard	Nominated
2022	Golden Globe Awards	Best Actor in a Motion Picture – Drama	Will Smith	Won
2022	Golden Globe Awards	Best Supporting Actress – Motion Picture	Aunjanue Ellis	Nominated
2022	Golden Globe Awards	Best Original Song – Motion Picture	Beyoncé and DIXSON (for "Be Alive")	Nominated
2022	Academy Awards	Best Picture	Tim White, Trevor White, and Will Smith	Nominated
2022	Academy Awards	Best Actor	Will Smith	Won
2022	Academy Awards	Best Supporting Actress	Aunjanue Ellis	Nominated
2022	Academy Awards	Best Original Screenplay	Zach Baylin	Nominated
2022	Academy Awards	Best Film Editing	Pamela Martin	Nominated
2022	Academy Awards	Best Original Song	Beyoncé and DIXSON (for "Be Alive")	Nominated
2023	NAACP Image Awards	Outstanding Actor in a Motion Picture	Will Smith	Won
2023	NAACP Image Awards	Outstanding Motion Picture	Emancipation	Nominated
2023	NAACP Image Awards	Outstanding Ensemble Cast in a Motion Picture	The cast of Emancipation	Nominated
2023	NAACP Image Awards	Outstanding Directing in a Motion Picture	Antoine Fuqua	Nominated
2023	NAACP Image Awards	Outstanding Costume Design (TV or Film)	Francine Jamison-Tanchuck	Nominated
2024	Daytime Emmy Awards	Outstanding Casting	Olissa Rogers & Christa Schamberger (African Queens: Njinga)	Won
2024	Daytime Emmy Awards	Outstanding Art Direction/Set Decoration/Scenic Design	Warren Gray (African Queens: Njinga)	Won
2024	Daytime Emmy Awards	Outstanding Hairstyling and Makeup	Gale Shepherd (African Queens: Njinga)	Won
2026	NAMIC Vision Awards	Drama Series or Special	Bel-Air	Won
