= Jaafar Jackson =

American actor and singer (born 1996)

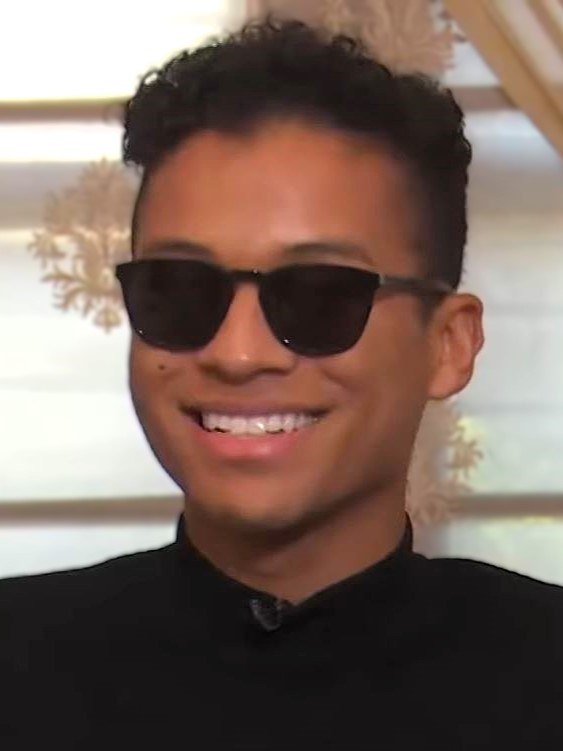
- Jackson in 2020
- Born: Jaafar Jeremiah Jackson; July 25, 1996 (age 30); Los Angeles, California, U.S.
- Occupations: Actor; singer; dancer
- Years active: 2015–present
- Partner: Maddie Simpson (2016–present)
- Parents: Jermaine Jackson (father); Alejandra Oaziaza (mother)
- Family: Jackson

Jaafar Jeremiah Jackson (Note: Pronunciation: /dʒəˈfɑːr/, jə-FAR) (born July 25, 1996) is an American actor and singer. A member of the Jackson family, he released his debut single "Got Me Singing" in 2019 and gained popularity for portraying his uncle Michael Jackson in the biographical film Michael (2026), which grossed over $1 billion globally, a role he will reprise in the sequel.

== Early life ==
Jaafar Jeremiah Jackson was born on July 25, 1996, in Los Angeles, the son of Jermaine Jackson of the Jackson family and Alejandra Genevieve Oaziaza, who was born in Bogotá, Colombia. Through both of his parents, he has 11 siblings–nine brothers and two sisters.

== Career ==
In 2015, Jackson was a main cast member in the filming of his family's reality show Living with the Jacksons. He has covered songs by Sam Cooke and Marvin Gaye; in 2019 he released his first single, "Got Me Singing". The single was originally associated with a full‑length unreleased album titled Famous. Jackson stated that he produced the album throughout 2019 and, during his visit to Pakistan in February 2020, suggested it would be released in May or June of that year. It was also announced in 2018 that he would collaborate with NASGO—a now-defunct e-commerce and cryptocurrency platform—to tokenize copies of Famous; however, the album release was eventually cancelled following the termination of his partnership with NASGO, allowing him to focus on acting. He appeared in Jackson-related projects, including The Jacksons: Next Generation and the music video for Tito Jackson's 2021 single "Love One Another". According to Empire, he "established a social media presence as a talented singer and dancer".

After a two-year casting process, it was confirmed in December 2023 that Jackson had been cast in the lead role of his uncle Michael Jackson in Michael, a biopic directed by Antoine Fuqua and distributed by Lionsgate in the United States and by Universal Pictures internationally. Michael's mother and Jackson's grandmother, Katherine Jackson, expressed approval of the casting, stating that he "embodies" her son. Jackson wrote on Instagram that he was "humbled and honored" to be chosen for the role. Principal photography began on November 27, 2023, in Los Angeles, and footage of Jackson on set appeared online shortly afterward.

Michael was released in April 2026. Its $217 million opening made it the highest‑grossing debut ever for a biographical film. Although the film received generally mixed to negative reviews overall, Jackson's performance was acclaimed by critics. In June, it became the highest‑grossing biopic of all time, earning $977 million worldwide, and it surpassed $1 billion at the box office in July. This made him the first lead actor to debut with over $1 billion.

In August 2026, it was announced that Jackson had been cast in the action thriller Supermax, alongside Will Smith and AnnaSophia Robb.

== Personal life ==
Jackson is of African-American and Hispanic descent. He has a younger brother, Jermajesty Jermaine Jackson (born 2000), in addition to several half-siblings from his parents' previous relationships. One of his half-brothers, Jermaine LaJaune "Jay" Jackson Jr. (born January 27, 1977), portrayed their father in the 1992 miniseries The Jacksons: An American Dream, a biographical film about the Jackson family. Jackson has said he is inspired by his musical family, as well as by Frank Sinatra and Stevie Wonder.

In early 2010, when he was 13, Jackson's family was investigated by police and child protection officers in Encino, Los Angeles, after he purchased a stun gun online. Jackson is engaged to Maddie Simpson; the couple have been together since 2016.

Jackson grew up in a Muslim household; in early 2020, he traveled to Saudi Arabia to perform Umrah, the Islamic pilgrimage to Mecca undertaken by millions of Muslims each year.

In April 2026, Jackson was honored during a Michael ceremony in Gary, Indiana, where he received the key to the city from Mayor Eddie Melton.

Jackson cites actors Daniel Day-Lewis, Joaquin Phoenix, and Christian Bale as his inspirations, noting that he studied their work ethic and performances while preparing for his acting debut.

== Filmography ==
Key
†	Denotes productions that have not yet been released

Year	Title	Role	Notes	Ref.
2026	Michael	Michael Jackson	Debut film	
2027	Supermax †	TBA	Filming	
TBA	Michael 2 †	Michael Jackson	Pre-Production	

== Discography ==
=== Singles ===
Year	Title
2019	"Got Me Singing"
2020	"Confused"

=== Music videos ===
Year	Song	Performer(s)	Notes
2019	"Got Me Singing"	Himself	
2021	"Love One Another"	Tito Jackson	Guest appearance

== Awards ==
Awards and nominations received by Jaafar Jackson
Award	Year	Work	Category	Result	Ref.
Astra Midseason Movie Awards	2026	Michael	Best Actor	Won	
National Film Awards	2026	Michael	Outstanding Performance	Won	
National Film Awards	2026	Michael	Best Newcomer	Won	
Celebration of Cinema and Television	2026	Michael	Actor Award – Film	Honored	
