= Living with the Jacksons =

2015 American television series

- Genre: Reality television
- Starring: Alejandra Jackson; Jaafar Jackson; Jermajesty Jackson; Randy Jackson Jr.
- Country of origin: United States
- Original language: English

Production
- Running time: 42 minutes
- Production companies: High Noon Productions; ID Productions

Original release
- Network: Reelz
- Release: 2015

Living with the Jacksons was announced as a six-part reality TV series on Reelz. Initially set to debut on November 18, 2014, it has been pushed back several times. As of 2025, only a trailer has been released, despite the entire series having been filmed.

== Premise ==
The show is set to follow Alejandra Jackson and her family which includes children she has with each of two different brothers from The Jackson 5 – Jaafar Jackson and Jermajesty Jackson from her later marriage to Jermaine Jackson, and Genevieve and Randy Jr. from her marriage to Randy Jackson. Plus an additional son Donte, whose parents are unknown, but have been speculated about in the media, initially adopted by Katherine Jackson and Joe Jackson, who Alejandra has raised since he was two. The show is to follow members who grew up inside the Jackson family estate and are now living outside of the Jackson compound, but still together, for the first time.

"Five years after the sudden death of Michael, Alejandra and her brood left the Jackson family estate, a move that may not have been on their own terms. "We didn’t want it to happen that way,” Genevieve Jackson said this past weekend at the summer TV critics’ tour.

Genevieve Jackson thought the show would give them a chance to expand their lives, as “Growing up we were very sheltered... Coming from this family there’s a lot of politics involved in it and there was a lot of outside people coming in and out of our house. So we had to watch what we said, how we acted because the media, the world was looking at us.”

== Production ==
The show was made with a skeleton crew, including only three producers at any level (associate, field, and executive). In July 2014, Reelz held a panel at the Television Critics Association press tour featuring Jaafar Jackson and Jermajesty Jackson, Genevieve Jackson, Randy Jackson Jr., and Alejandra Jackson. In October 2014, Reelz announced that the show’s premiere date was moving to “early 2015 with a specific date TBA.” Later, it was reported that according to an insider, the show was not delivered in a timely fashion and is no longer active, with one producer stating the entire show had been filmed and then the subsidiary production company went bankrupt during the editing process.
