= The Picture Company =

US film production company

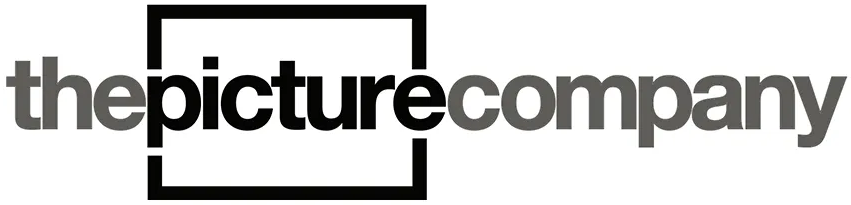
- Type: Private
- Industry: Entertainment
- Founded: 2014; 12 years ago
- Founders: Andrew Rona; Alex Heineman
- Headquarters: Glendale, California, U.S.
- Key people: Andrew Rona; Alex Heineman; Jovi Lee
- Services: Film production
- Owner: StudioCanal (minority)

The Picture Company is an American entertainment company founded in 2014, by Andrew Rona and Alex Heineman, in Glendale, California. It specializes in film, starting off moderately in 2018 with Jaume Collet-Serra's The Commuter and Albert Hughes' Alpha.

== History ==
=== Founding ===
The Picture Company was founded in 2014 by film veterans Andrew Rona and Alex Heineman. Rona is a former president at Silver Pictures and Rogue Pictures, and Heineman was an EVP at Silver Pictures.

The company began in 2014 with a first-look deal with StudioCanal. The company achieved its first theatrical releases with Jaume Collet-Serra's The Commuter, Albert Hughes' Alpha, and Sam Taylor-Johnson's A Million Little Pieces. StudioCanal would later go on to buy a minority stake in The Picture Company in 2023 and ink a new five-year overall deal with the company.

=== Future projects ===
Since September 2014, The Picture Company has announced several projects which have not yet been realised, including the adaptation of Mitch Swenson's The Tracking Of A Russian Spy, for which Nima Nourizadeh replaced Pierre Morel as director and Logan Lerman and Olivia Cooke were in talks to star. Also announced were Nottingham & Hood, a Pirates Of The Caribbean-style Robin Hood movie for Walt Disney Studios Motion Pictures, a remake of Escape from New York for StudioCanal, as well as the movie version of David-Jan Bronsgeest's short film Meet Jimmy, with Platinum Dunes also producing for Paramount Pictures. Also pending are Harry Bradbeer's film The Paris Trap, for StudioCanal and David Bruckner's film Out There, for Entertainment One.

== Filmography ==
=== Released ===
Motion pictures from The Picture Company, listed by theatrical release date
Film	Director	Release date	Distributor	Gross box office (USD)
The Commuter	Jaume Collet-Serra	January 12, 2018	StudioCanal	$119.9 million
Alpha	Albert Hughes	August 17, 2018	Columbia Pictures	$98.2 million
A Million Little Pieces	Sam Taylor-Johnson	December 6, 2019	Momentum Pictures	
Come Play	Jacob Chase	October 30, 2020	Focus Features	
Gunpowder Milkshake	Aharon Keshales; Navot Papushado	July 14, 2021	StudioCanal; STX Films & Netflix	
Retribution	Nimród Antal	August 25, 2023	Lionsgate	
Role Play	Thomas Vincent	January 12, 2024	Amazon MGM Studios	
A Complete Unknown	James Mangold	December 25, 2024	Searchlight Pictures	$140 million
Baghead	Alberto Corredor	April 5, 2024	StudioCanal	
Supermax	David Gordon Green	October 15, 2027	Miramax and Westbrook Studios; distributed by Amazon MGM Studios	

=== Upcoming films ===
Motion pictures from The Picture Company, in development
Film	Director	Release date	Ref.
The Appearance		TBA	
Control	Robert Schwentke	TBA	
The Corporation		TBA	
Endless Night	Jonathan Entwistle	TBA	
Escape from New York	Zack Snyder	TBA	
The French Quarter Will Not Be Spared		TBA	
The Fury of a Patient Man	Albert Hughes	TBA	
Hellish Nell		TBA	
Honey Trapped		TBA	
Inside		TBA	
The Last Battle		TBA	
Leap	Mohamed Diab	TBA	
May You Live in Interesting Times		TBA	
Meet Jimmy	David-Jan Bronsgeest	TBA	
Mercy Sparx		TBA	
Nottingham & Hood		TBA	
Out There	Stefan Grube	TBA	
The Paris Trap	Harry Bradbeer	TBA	
Rodeo		TBA	
Supermax	David Gordon Green	TBA	
System Crasher		TBA	
They Hear It	Julian Terry	TBA	
The Tracking Of A Russian Spy	Nima Nourizadeh	TBA	
The Travelers	Josh Gordon, Will Speck	TBA	
Tyrant	David Weil	TBA	
Unexplained Phenomenon	Dean Israelite	TBA	
Whisper	Julian Terry	TBA	
The White Room	Rod Blackhurst	TBA	

== See also ==
- STX Entertainment
- Neon
- Amazon MGM Studios
- Annapurna Pictures
- Blumhouse Productions
- Studio 8
