= Alexander Rudd =

- Born: 21 September 1981 (age 44)
- Origin: Preston, United Kingdom
- Genres: Film scores Musical Theatre
- Occupations: Composer, Conductor, Music producer
- Instruments: Piano, Singer
- Years active: 2005–present

Alexander Paul Rudd (born 1981) is an English award-winning composer, songwriter and conductor working in film, television, theatre and the concert hall.

At the age of 16, Rudd won the National Young Composer of the Year Award. He is a Fulbright Scholar and studied at Trinity College of Music and the University of Southern California. In 2009, Rudd received a UK Film Council Award, enabling him to work and study in Los Angeles. His mentor is American composer and songwriter Randy Newman.

== Early life ==
He was a student at Our Lady's High School, Fulwood, Preston – although he also spent two years at Stonyhurst College, a Jesuit Catholic boarding school in the north of England. From the age of sixteen he worked as a pianist and singer entertainer in bars and clubs working all over the UK. He studied composition at Trinity College of Music with Alwynne Pritchard who introduced him to the works of contemporary composers such as Xenakis, Ligeti, Schoenberg and Messiaen. In the evenings he worked as the resident Jazz singer and pianist at The Dorchester, Claridges and The Savoy in London. He also taught the piano and worked as a musical director at James Allen Girls School in Dulwich. During this time he met composer Howard Blake who encouraged him to pursue a career as a film composer.

== Music career ==
Rudd works across many different styles and genres. His career started in the theatre and he has composed the scores for numerous plays, including collaborations with the Royal National Theatre, The Old Vic, The Barbican, Plymouth Theatre Royal, Sheffield Theatres, Liverpool Everyman, West Yorkshire Playhouse, Watford Palace Theatre, Greenwich Theatre and Edinburgh's Traverse Theatre. Rudd was a founder member of Wild Oats, a theatre company whose aim is to 'present exciting new theatrical works to British audiences'. He writes musicals and wrote 'Force 9 & ½’ with John Nicholson (Peepolycus). This won a Musical Theatre Award at the Edinburgh Festival. Rudd regularly collaborates with writer and lyricist, Jenifer Toksvig. Together they have written three musicals, including 'The Stones Are Hatching', which is an adaptation of the book by Geraldine McCaughrean and 'The Queen of Snow', which was commissioned by the Yvonne Arnaud Theatre, Guildford. Rudd has been a great supporter of Youth Music Theatre UK and has received several commissions from them. He collaborated with Hoipolloi on their production of The Doubtful Guest inspired by the book of the same name by Edward Gorey. He is very active as a film composer and is credited as composer on the Warner Brothers movie, ‘Unknown’ starring Liam Neeson. In 2010, Rudd worked on the final season of Michael Giacchino's score for the hit television series "Lost". He composed and conducted the score for the award-winning short, 'Thule' directed by Robert Scott Wildes.

=== Concert music ===
In 2005, Rudd was the featured British composer in the International Artists Workshop organized by the European Union. His concert works have since been performed in Europe, UK and the US.

Selected Concert Works:

- Amor Volat Undique

commissioned by Institut Européen de Chant Choral, premiered at the Grand Ducal Institute in Luxembourg, 2007

- Her Number Was Not Called

Commissioned by Verin Exil in Vienna celebrating the work of Austrian beat poet, Ruth Weiss, 2006

- Resolution

commissioned by the Virtuosi della Fenice, premiered at Teatro La Fenice, Venice. 2006

- Furore

for symphony orchestra and tape, premiered at Blackheath Halls, London, 2005.
