= Murray v Foyle Meats Ltd =

United Kingdom court case about labour law

- Court: House of Lords
- Citations: [1999] UKHL 30, [1999] ICR 827

Keywords
- Redundancy

Murray v Foyle Meats Ltd [1999] UKHL 30 is a UK labour law case, concerning redundancy, specifically the interpretation of the Employment Rights Act 1996.

== Facts ==
Foyle Meats Ltd's slaughtering business was declining. The company eliminated one production line in the slaughter hall, and 35 meat plant operatives were made redundant from the slaughter hall. The employees all had flexibility clauses, and they sometimes rotated departments to the boning or loading hall, etc. The dismissed employees claimed they were not redundant because the employer still needed workers under the same terms, just in different departments.

== Judgment ==
Lord Irvine LC held that the operatives were redundant and that "the language of the [Employment Rights Act 1996 section 139(1)(b)] is in my view simplicity itself". He referred to Nelson v BBC which had wrongly propagated the "contract test" view, which was wrong. A simple causation test was applied, based on the word "attributable" in the statute. Did diminishing demand for labor cause the dismissal?

The argument before the Employment Appeal Tribunal turned on whether the ‘contract test’ ought to be applied (i.e. did the company require fewer employees [sic] of the kind specified in Mr Pink’s contract)…
