= Rodina (magazine) =

Russian popular science and history magazine

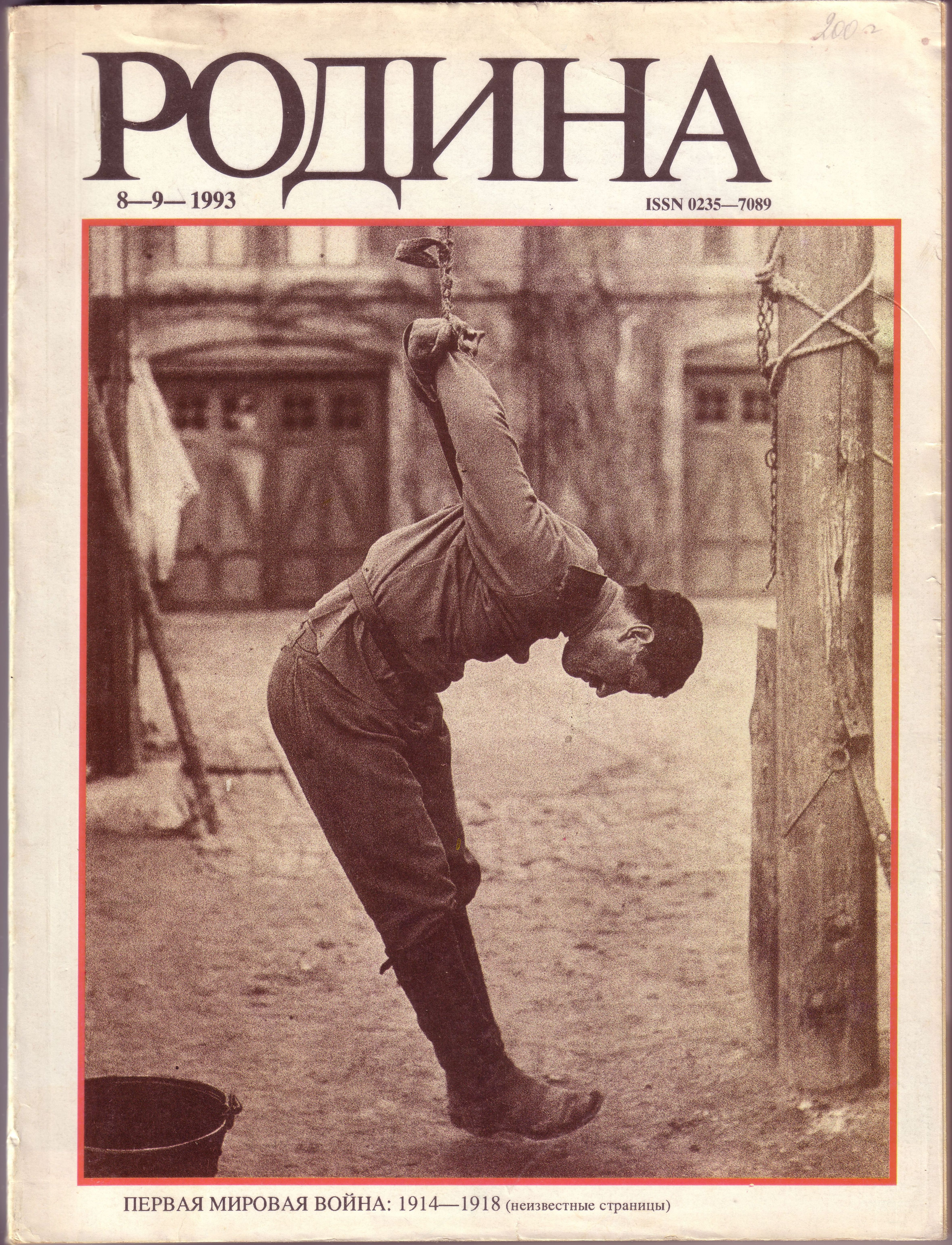
- 1993 issue, on World War I
- Categories: Popular science History
- Founded: 1989
- Country: Russia
- Language: Russian

Rodina (Russian: Родина, lit. 'Motherland') is a Russian illustrated popular science history magazine headquartered in Moscow. It was established in January 1989 as a continuation of the magazine with the same name established in the Russian Empire in 1879. The founders of the magazine are the Government of the Russian Federation and the Administration of the President of the Russian Federation

In July 2005 the Higher Attestation Commission of Russia included Rodina into its "List of Leading Peer-Reviewed Journals and Publications". (This list is for the journals where the major results from theses for the higher scientific degrees (kandidat and doktor) must be published.)

In August 2007 the magazine was awarded with the state honorary badge "For Active Work on Patriotic Upbringing of the Citizens of the Russian Federation" ("За активную работу по патриотическому воспитанию граждан Российской Федерации").

In 2021 it was awarded the Belyaev Prize. It is awarded for the best popular science work and for educational activities in science in general.

== History ==
Rodina was established in 1989 during the final years of the Soviet Union, reviving the title of a pre-revolutionary magazine with the same name. Originally published by state-run entities, it transitioned through the political shifts of the 1990s while maintaining a strong focus on Russian history and culture. In 2005, it was granted official support from both the Presidential Administration and the Federal Archival Agency, solidifying its role as a government-aligned historical publication.

== Editorial Focus and Content ==
Rodina publishes articles on Russian and world history, biographies of historical figures, archival research, and cultural commentary. The magazine often includes materials promoting patriotic values and national identity. It aims to popularize historical knowledge among the general public and often collaborates with historians, educators, and governmental bodies.

== Recognition and Awards ==
In 2007, Rodina was awarded the state prize for its significant role in patriotic education. The recognition was given by Presidential decree No. 658, citing the magazine’s contribution to historical enlightenment and its influence in fostering civic pride.
