= Williams v Compair Maxam Ltd =

UK labour law case

- Court: Employment Appeal Tribunal
- Decided: 22 January 1982
- Citation: [1982] ICR 156

Case opinions
- Browne-Wilkinson J

Keywords
- Unfair dismissal

Williams v Compair Maxam Ltd [1982] ICR 156 is a UK labour law case, concerning unfair dismissal, now governed by the Employment Rights Act 1996.

== Facts ==
Compair Maxam Ltd was losing business. Departmental managers picked teams of core staff who could be retained to keep the business viable. They chose on personal preference for what they thought would be good for the company, but the union was not consulted. Other employees were dismissed for redundancy and given money beyond statutory minima. Five workers claimed dismissal was unfair.

The Tribunal dismissed the claims, saying that the managers’ preferences were a reasonable way of doing the job. This was appealed on grounds of perversity.

== Judgment ==
Browne-Wilkinson J said that there was an error of law by reaching a conclusion so perverse on the facts. The dismissal selection was unfair, ‘the correct approach is to consider whether an industrial tribunal, properly directed in law and properly appreciating what is currently regarded as fair industrial practice, could have reached the decision reached by the majority of this tribunal. We have reached the conclusion that it could not.’ His judgment was as follows.

In considering whether the decision of an industrial tribunal is perverse in a legal sense, there is one feature which does not occur in other jurisdictions where there is a right of appeal only on a point of law. The Industrial Tribunal is an industrial jury which brings to its task a knowledge of industrial relations both from the view point of the employer and the employee. Matters of good industrial relations practice are not proved before an industrial tribunal as they would be proved before an ordinary court: the lay members are taken to know them. The lay members of the Industrial Tribunal bring to their task their expertise in a field where conventions and practices are of the greatest importance. Therefore in considering whether the decision of an industrial tribunal is perverse, it is not safe to rely solely on the common sense and knowledge of those who have no experience in the field of industrial relations. A course of conduct which to those who have no practical experience with industrial relations might appear unfair or unreasonable, to those with specialist knowledge and experience might appear both fair and reasonable: and vice versa.

For this reason, it seems to us that the correct approach is to consider whether an industrial tribunal, properly directed in law and properly appreciating what is currently regarded as fair industrial practice, could have reached the decision reached by the majority of this tribunal. We have reached the conclusion that it could not....

...the question we have to decide is whether a reasonable tribunal could have reached the conclusion that the dismissal of the applicants in this case lay within the range of conduct which a reasonable employer could have adopted. It is accordingly necessary to try to set down in very general terms what a properly instructed industrial tribunal would know to be the principles which, in current industrial practice, a reasonable employer would be expected to adopt. This is not a matter on which the chairman of this appeal tribunal feels that he can contribute much, since it depends on what industrial practices are currently accepted as being normal and proper. The two lay members of this appeal tribunal hold the view that it would be impossible to lay down detailed procedures which all reasonable employers would follow in all circumstances: the fair conduct of dismissals for redundancy must depend on the circumstances of each case. But in their experience, there is a generally accepted view in industrial relations that, in cases where the employees are represented by an independent union recognised by the employer, reasonable employers will seek to act in accordance with the following principles:

1. The employer will seek to give as much warning as possible of impending redundancies so as to enable the union and employees who may be affected to take early steps to inform themselves of the relevant facts, consider possible alternative solutions and, _f necessary, find alternative employment in the undertaking or elsewhere.

2. The employer will consult the union as to the best means by which the desired management result can be achieved fairly and with as little hardship to the employees as possible. In particular, the employer will seek to agree with the union the criteria to be applied in selecting the employees to be made redundant. When a selection has been made, the employer will consider with the union whether the selection has been made in accordance with those criteria.

3. Whether or not an agreement as to the criteria to be adopted has been agreed with the union, the employer will seek to establish criteria for selection which so far as possible do not depend solely upon the opinion of the person making the selection but can be objectively checked against such things as attendance record, efficiency at the job, experience, or length of service.

4. The employer will seek to ensure that the selection is made fairly in accordance with these criteria and will consider any representations the union may make as to such selection.

5. The employer will seek to see whether instead of dismissing an employee he could offer him alternative employment.

The lay members stress that not all these factors are present in every case since circumstances may prevent one or more of them being given effect to. But the lay members would expect these principles to be departed from only where some good reason is shown to justify such departure. The basic approach is that, in the unfortunate circumstances that necessarily attend redundancies, as much as is reasonably possible should be done to mitigate the impact on the work force and to satisfy them that the selection has been made fairly and not on the basis of personal whim.

== Influence ==
The judgment of the case and its summary have often been cited by many legal organisations and unions to explain workers' rights when they are made redundant, and in some cases when this judgment may not apply.

== See also ==
- UK labour law
