= Studio 8 (company) =

American entertainment company

- Type: Private
- Industry: Entertainment
- Founded: January 3, 2014; 12 years ago
- Founders: Jeff Robinov; John Graham; Mark Miner
- Headquarters: Culver City, California, U.S.
- Key people: Jeff Robinov
- Services: Film production
- Number of employees: 11-50
- Divisions: Studio 8 Television
- Website: www.studio8.com

Studio 8 is an American entertainment company founded in 2014, by Jeff Robinov, John Graham, and Mark Miner based in Culver City. It specializes in film and television production.

Robinov, Graham and Miner prior to Studio 8 worked in film and production, before leaving to eventually co-found the company. Starting off moderately in 2016 with Billy Lynn's Long Halftime Walk, the following theatrical releases included Brett Sumner's West of the West, Albert Hughes' Alpha, and Yann Demange's White Boy Rick.

== History ==
=== 2014: Founding ===
Studio 8 was founded on 2012, by film veterans Jeff Robinov, John Graham, Mark Miner. Robinov is a former film executive at Warner Bros, Graham was the production EP of Paramount Pictures and Screen Gems director of development, and Miner was the EVP of story and creative at Paramount and studio analyst at Universal Pictures.

The company began in 2014 with funding Fosun Group and Sony Pictures Entertainment. The company marked its first theatrical release with Ang Lee's Billy Lynn's Long Halftime Walk. The following theatrical releases included Brett Sumner's West of the West, Albert Hughes' Alpha, and Yann Demange's White Boy Rick.

In December 2017, Fosun was rumored to sell its stake in Studio 8, but only after the performances of Alpha and White Boy Rick.

=== 2018: Television and future projects ===
In January 2018, Studio 8 announced that it would start a television division led by Steve Mosko and Katherine Pope. The first series is Hugh Howey's Beacon 23 with Zak Penn as writer and producer.

Studio 8 will produce Robert Eggers's medieval fantasy The Knight and remake of Nosferatu starring Lily-Rose Depp. In December 2015, Studio 8 acquired Lee's Thrilla in Manila movie with Peter Morgan as writer and David Oyelowo possibly playing Joe Frazier. In April 2016, Studio 8 will co-produce Hughes' next movie The Fury of a Patient Man, along with The Picture Company. In July 2017, Studio 8 acquired the rights to the Daily Beast article "The Possibly-True Story of the Super-Burglar Trained to Rip Off al Qaeda," with George Mastras as screenwriter. In July 2018, Studio 8 acquired the movie rights to Rob Liefeld's Prophet, to produce films with Liefeld and Adrian Askarieh as producers.

== Filmography ==
=== Released ===
Year	Film	Director	Release date	Gross box office (USD)
2016	West of the West	Brent Sumner	March 6, 2016	Limited release
2016	Billy Lynn's Long Halftime Walk	Ang Lee	November 11, 2016	$30.9 million
2018	Alpha	Albert Hughes	August 17, 2018	$98.2 million
2018	White Boy Rick	Yann Demange	September 14, 2018	$25.8 million
2023	Hypnotic	Robert Rodriguez	May 12, 2023	$2.4 million
2024	The Instigators	Doug Liman	August 2, 2024	
2024	Nosferatu	Robert Eggers	December 25, 2024	

=== Upcoming films ===
Year	Film	Director	Release date	Ref
TBA	A Most Dangerous Man			
TBA	Adulting			
TBA	Baby Monster			
TBA	Black	Gerard McMurray		
TBA	The Brain Hack	Joe White		
TBA	Champion			
TBA	The Fury of a Patient Man	Albert Hughes		
TBA	The Hidden Girl			
TBA	Huck			
TBA	Mind Fall	Cedric Jimenez		
TBA	Osama's 11			
TBA	Overheard			
TBA	Planet Kill	Steven Soderbergh		
TBA	Pontius Pilate			
TBA	Prophet	Sam Hargrave		
TBA	Sandman Slim	Chad Stahelski		
TBA	Scout	Christopher MacBride		
TBA	The Shoe	Wash Westmoreland		
TBA	Sinbad	Miguel Sapochnik		
TBA	Storm King	Rupert Wyatt		
TBA	Thrilla in Manila	Ang Lee		
TBA	Undying Love	David Leitch		
TBA	Untitled Fenn Treasure action comedy	Jake Szymanski		
TBA	Untitled Francesco Munzi film	Francesco Munzi		
TBA	Way Down Dark			

=== Television ===
Television series by Studio 8, listed by initial air date or in development
Year	Name	Air date	Number of seasons	Number of episodes	Network
2023	Beacon 23	November 12, 2023 – May 26, 2024	2	16	MGM+
TBA	Heartthrob	TBA	TBA	TBA	TBA

== See also ==
- STX Entertainment
- Neon
- Amazon Studios
- Annapurna Pictures
- Blumhouse Productions
