= StudioCanal =

French film and television studio and distributor

StudioCanal S.A.S.
- Logo used since 2011
- Formerly: Canal+ Production (1987–1990); Le Studio Canal+ (1990–2000); Canal+ D.A. (1992–2000)
- Type: Subsidiary (Société par actions simplifiée)
- Industry: Filmmaking; Film distribution
- Predecessors: Maxam; Carolco Pictures; Orange Studio
- Founded: 1 January 1987; 39 years ago
- Founder: Pierre Lescure
- Headquarters: Paris, France
- Area served: Worldwide
- Key people: Maxime Saada (Chairman); Anna Marsh (CEO)
- Parent: Canal+
- Divisions: StudioCanal Australia; StudioCanal GmbH; StudioCanal Kids & Family; StudioCanal On Stage; StudioCanal Original; StudioCanal Stories; StudioCanal UK
- Subsidiaries: Tandem Productions; Paddington and Company; Harvey Unna and Stephen Durbridge Limited; Sixth Dimension; SAM Productions (25%); SunnyMarch TV (20%); Urban Myth Films; Bambú Producciones (33%); Lailaps Films; ROK Studios; MultiChoice Studios (45%); Zacu Entertainment; Marodi TV; British Pathé; Lucky Red (51%); Dutch FilmWorks (majority); The Picture Company (minority)
- Website: studiocanal.com

StudioCanal S.A.S., also known as StudioCanal International and Canal+ Production and formerly known as Le Studio Canal+, Canal Plus, Canal+ Distribution and Canal+ D.A., is a French film and television production and distribution company and a subsidiary of Canal+ S.A.

As of September 2025, the company has 13 production companies in Europe and the United States, and holds around 9,000 titles in its film library.

== History ==
On 1 January 1987, Canal+ Productions was founded as a cinema film co-production subsidiary of the cable channel Canal+. The subscription channel was co-founded by André Rousselet and Pierre Lescure in 1984. This was to reduce Canal+'s dependence on the American major studios by building its own library that the pay-TV channel could use on their own channels and internationally.

By December 1990, Canal+ Productions rebranded to Le Studio Canal+, and released its first film, The Double Life of Veronique, by Krzysztof Kieslowski. By the early 1990s, it became apparent that Canal+ was a major contributor to the French film industry, with its obligation to spend 10% of its income on French-made films, as well as being Europe's largest buyer of American film rights. Canal+ also made investments in other companies. In 1991, it bought a five percent stake in the independent American studio Carolco Pictures. However, in 1992, Le Studio Canal+ suffered financial difficulties after Carolco Pictures entered a corporate restructure.

StudioCanal's most notable productions from its early years include Terminator 2: Judgment Day, JFK, Basic Instinct, Cliffhanger, Under Siege, Free Willy, and the original Stargate movie. In those days, it was known as either Le Studio Canal+ or simply Canal+.

Other films the company financed include U-571, Bully, and Bridget Jones's Diary. StudioCanal also funded the last third of David Lynch's film Mulholland Drive. StudioCanal also financed French-language films, such as Brotherhood of the Wolf (which became the sixth-highest-grossing French-language film of all time in the United States) and Intimate Strangers. Films such as Terminator 2: Judgment Day which grossed US$519 million, Basic Instinct which grossed US$352 million and The Tourist which grossed US$278 million worldwide, have been big box-office hits for StudioCanal.

In January 1996, Le Studio Canal+ made a $56 million bid for the library of the American independent film studio Carolco Pictures. 20th Century Fox (now 20th Century Studios), which had originally agreed to buy the library for $50 million, had dropped their bid to $47.5 million and ultimately dropped out of contention, making this acquisition Canal+'s first foray into library acquisitions.

Le Studio Canal+'s original plan was to build a pan-European distribution network. They made their first known acquisition into a foreign market in 1997 when they bought a 20% minority stake in German film distribution company Tobis Film, marking their first entry into the German movie distribution market; they would later increase their stake to 60% in February 2000, renaming the company Tobis StudioCanal.

On 1 December 1998, all of Canal+ film, television, music, video production activities, etc., were grouped into a new entity, Canal+ Image, which was rebranded StudioCanal in 2000.

Sometime in October 2000, Ellipse License, the licensing arm of Ellipse Programme had been transferred to StudioCanal and became its in-house licensing division as it was renamed to StudioCanal License after when Ellipse Programme's parent Canal+ had merged its TV subsidiary production outfit Ellipse Programme with French television production group Expand.

In December 2000, StudioCanal partnered with Italian public broadcasting company RAI through the latter's division Rai Cinema to launch a joint venture distribution company in Italy, marking StudioCanal's first entry into the Italian film production and distribution market; the joint venture film distribution company's name was later revealed to be 01 Distribution one year later in May 2001. However, in June 2003, StudioCanal announced it had relinquished their 50% stake to RAI, giving the latter full control of 01 Distribution.

In July 2001, StudioCanal entered the Spanish film industry by acquiring a 45% stake in Sogepaq from Spanish pay television company Sogecable (Vivendi Universal owned 21% of Sogecable at the time) for $36.2 million, also giving the former a 73% controlling stake in its Spanish subsidiary StudioCanal España and a minority stake in the joint venture Warner Sogefilms. The following month, StudioCanal acquired a 52% stake in French television production powerhouse Expand.

In May 2002, StudioCanal expanded their Italian operations by setting up an in-house production outfit based in Rome named StudioCanal Urania, aiming to produce up to three films annually.

In late-September 2002, StudioCanal announced that they and BAC Majestic had parted ways. Terms of the deal included the sale of their joint venture Mars Distribution to StudioCanal, while BAC Distribution would revert to BAC Majestic.

In July 2003, StudioCanal partnered with French animation studio Alphanim (now Gaumont Animation) and had jointly established the home entertainment subsidiary entitled Alphanim Video to distribute Alphanim's catalogue on home media.

Staff departures and its parent Vivendi Universal's debt forced StudioCanal to gradually sell off their interests in these companies:

- Tobis StudioCanal was subject to a management buyout by CEO Kilian Rebentrost and shareholder Pathé in December 2002 and renamed back to Tobis Film, although the two companies maintained their business relations.
- Sogepaq was sold back to Sogecable in July 2003 for £48 million ($54.2 million).
- Mars Films split from StudioCanal in 2007 to become independent; StudioCanal would later buy a 30% stake in the company in September 2015 and begin controlling its library in August 2021.

Three years later, StudioCanal re-entered the international market by acquiring British film distributor Optimum Releasing in May 2006 as their first expansion into the United Kingdom, releasing their British film and television catalogue, including the EMI Films library, through the newly acquired company. A year later in 2007, Optimum Home Entertainment and Lionsgate UK acquired Elevation Sales, a home entertainment sales and distribution company.

In August 2007, StudioCanal partnered with NBC Universal's international home entertainment division Universal Pictures International Entertainment to launch a joint venture home entertainment distribution subsidiary called Universal Studio Canal Video.

In January 2008, StudioCanal acquired German-based film independent distributor Kinowelt, which had distributed StudioCanal's films there until then, marking a re-entry for StudioCanal into the German market. Kinowelt also owned the DVD label Arthaus. Both Optimum Releasing and Kinowelt have since been merged into StudioCanal were rebranded as StudioCanal Limited and StudioCanal GmbH respectively.

In January 2012, StudioCanal expanded its European operations by acquiring a majority stake in Munich-based producer and distributor Tandem Productions, marking the company's first major move into television production. StudioCanal would later buy out the company's remaining shares in May 2020.

In July 2012, StudioCanal made a deal with Australian and New Zealand cinema chain Hoyts to acquire the latter's independent film distribution division Hoyts Distribution, marking StudioCanal's first acquisition outside of Europe and its first entry into the Australian film and television distribution market; the company was rebranded to StudioCanal Pty Limited one year later in April 2013.

In late-February 2013, StudioCanal had sued its American film production/distribution studio, Universal Pictures at Los Angeles Superior Court, over its partnership with Universal Pictures' British film & television production subsidiary Working Title Films, that StudioCanal & Universal Pictures formed a joint-venture production pact in 1999 to fund, produce and distribute Working Title's films, as StudioCanal filed a lawsuit against the film studio Universal Pictures alleging that its failure to honor fiduciary and contractual responsibilities in their longtime joint venture to fund movies, under-reporting and double-charging, StudioCanal claimed that Universal Pictures & its parent NBCUniversal failed to account for “tens of millions of dollars and likely more” from films developed by Universal's British unit Working Title Films

In December 2013, StudioCanal announced its acquisition of a majority stake in the British independent TV production company Red Production Company, expanded StudioCanal's British activities into the British television industry.

In May 2014, StudioCanal expanded their operations into the Scandinavian market, joining forces with Danish screenwriter and author Søren Sveistrup, screenwriter Adam Price and film and television producer Meta Louise Foldager to launch a new Danish television production company based in Copenhagen named SAM Productions, with the latter becoming CEO of the new production company.

In September 2014, StudioCanal announced a first-look deal with the newly established American entertainment company The Picture Company, founded by former Silver Pictures employees Andrew Rona and Alex Heinemann. The deal was extended in May 2023, with StudioCanal acquiring a minority stake in the company alongside a new five-year deal.

In May 2015, StudioCanal collaborated with Japanese publishing company Kadokawa Corporation to restore Akira Kurosawa's highly acclaimed film Ran for its 30th anniversary with French film processing company Éclair restoring the film in 4K under the supervision of the two companies ahead of the film's re-release in Japanese theatres before releasing it to French cinemas.

In April 2016, StudioCanal further extended their British film and television activities by acquiring a 20% stake in two London-based British film and television production companies: actor Benedict Cumberbatch's film and television production company SunnyMarch TV and Johnny Capps and Julian Murphy's television production company Urban Myth Films; they also acquired a 33% stake in Spanish television production company Bambú Producciones, marking StudioCanal's re-entry into the Spanish film & television production business.

In June 2016, following the success of the 2014 film Paddington, StudioCanal acquired the Paddington Bear brand along with Paddington & Company and The Copyrights Group, the franchise's merchandise licensing agent. StudioCanal then announced that it would be producing three more Paddington films, including a show on Nick Jr. in 2020.

In 2017, StudioCanal, who owns Carolco Pictures' library, reached an agreement with the revived American film studio Carolco, whereby the French film production and distribution studio would have sole control of the Carolco name and logo and the revived Carolco Pictures company would be renamed Recall Studios; this agreement settled a legal dispute over the Carolco mark brought by StudioCanal. The arrangement took effect on November 29 of that year.

In July 2021, StudioCanal announced their acquisition of German production company Lailaps Films.

In June 2022, StudioCanal expanded into the Benelux film & television market by acquiring a majority stake in the Dutch independent film production and distribution firm Dutch FilmWorks.

In October 2022, StudioCanal entered a partnership with Rome-based Italian film production company Elsinore Film to jointly co-develop and co-produce a slate of scripted and unscripted content for the international market, marking a re-entry for StudioCanal into the Italian film & television business.

In March 2023, StudioCanal have teamed up with fellow Canal+ Group subsidiary M7 Group (now Canal+ Beneluz and Central Europe]] and in-car entertainment platform ZYNC to bring StudioCanal's premium film & television prigramming library and its movies & series to be avaliable on the in-car streaming platform ZYNC, the content partnership had launched initially in Mercedes-Benz EQS, S-Class and other models, with more makes, models and automotive brands to follow A month later in April of that year, StudioCanal had started filming on its adaptation of Matt Haig's bestselling novel How to Stop Time during MIPTV 2023 as the film adaptation of the novel have been turned into a TV series with them & its film/television production subsidiary SunnyMarch set to produce the series while actor & founder of StudioCanal's subsidiary SunnyMarch, Benedict Cumberpatch set to star as Tom Hazard, StudioCanal had also comfirmed that they had officially taken an stake in a British film & television studio Strong Film + Television, a British film & television company that was founded in 2020 by Broadchurch director & co-founder/joint creative director James Strong, executive producer & co-founder Loretta Preece and leading UK executive/co-founder Matt Tombs, the acquisition of the stake of the studio gained StudioCanal another British subsidiary, StudioCanal will partner with the new studio Strong Film + Television.

In October 2023, StudioCanal had teamed up with the French animation studio & entertainment production/distribution group Superprod Group via its Superprod Animation division, which Superprod Animation previously co-produced & handled animation for StudioCanal's The Adventures of Paddington and the Dutch-based entertainment IP management & publishing company Mercis BV to develop & produce a new CGI-animated series featuring Dick Bruna's famous beloved character Miffy entitled Miffy & Friends (not to be confused with the 2003 stop-motion series of the same name), StudioCanal would produce it while its executive MD of TV series, Francoise Guyonnet, would serve as producer alongside Superprod's founders Clément Calvet and Jérémie Fajner who are served as co-producers & Superprod Animation would co-produce & handle animation production servies at its Paris & Angoulême-based studios and Mercis BV while StudioCanal would handle distribution to the series alongside Superprod's distribution arm Superights Kids & Family while Mercis BV would distribute it in Netherlands and Japan.

In March 2024, StudioCanal launched their first in-house production label, an unnamed film & television production genre label dedicated to horror, thriller and sci-fi action movies and had hired former StudioCanal UK executive Jed Benedict as the CEO of the label. In February 2025, the label, now christened Sixth Dimension, made its first acquisition by acquiring distribution rights outside North America to an upcoming reboot of the Silent Night, Deadly Night series from Cineverse.

In April 2024, StudioCanal established an in-house production label dedicated to publishing book-to-screen adaptations called StudioCanal Stories, which would produce film and television adaptations of famous books and novels; StudioCanal had previously produced adaptations of novels such as War of the Worlds. StudioCanal's head of TV series department Sarah Reese Geffroy was appointed senior vice president of the new label.

In July 2024, StudioCanal expanded their American operations by launching their second American office based in New York City and promoted former global distribution sales chief Anne Chérel to oversee the office as StudioCanal's chief commercial officer.

In September 2024, StudioCanal rebranded their merchandising and licensing company The Copyrights Group to StudioCanal Kids & Family to expand their kids and family brand portfolio; they will also lead worldwide brand development, licensing and retail services, with Francoise Guyonnet continuing to be the CEO of the renamed division.

In October 2024, StudioCanal signed an international distribution deal with American independent film production company River Road Entertainment for nine feature films and two documentaries for theatrical, television, SVOD and other media.

In June 2025, StudioCanal announced their decision to shut down British television production outfit Red Production Company due to Patrick Schweitzer stepping down as chief executive officer, with Red's current and future slate being taken over by StudioCanal's British television production division StudioCanal TV UK.

In October 2025, StudioCanal reorganized its worldwide television production division under executive managing director Mary-Kathryn Kennedy, bringing all of StudioCanal's television production subsidiaries under one senior management team. As part of the reorganisation, Alix Lebrat was named senior vice president of series for France & Southern Europe and would oversee French & Spanish-language states, with StudioCanal planning to borden its scripted production in its home country under labels such as 2eme Bureau.

Near the end of November 2025 and following the success of the westend musical Paddington the Musical, StudioCanal expanded its stage operations by launching its own stage division entitled StudioCanal On Stage that would produce its stage, theatre and live experiences based on StudioCanal's own intellectual properties from its film & television catalogue such as Paddington including producing its own adaptations of broadways starting with the broadway revival of Mel Brooks's 1967 Embassy Pictures film The Producers and the broadway adaptation of 1949 Ealing Studios film Kind Hearts and Coronets with StudioCanal's vice president of global productions Ron Halpern leading StudioCanal On Stage as president of development.

In February 2026, StudioCanal acquired a 51% majority stake in the Italian distribution company Lucky Red, which has previously distributed multiple films from the former in Italy; co-founder Andrea Occhipinti retains the remaining 49% and will continue to serve as its CEO.

In June 2026 following the success of StudioCanal's partnership with Superprod Group for The Adventures of Paddington and Miffy & Friends, StudioCanal, via its television arm StudioCanal Television, and French entertainment production/distribution group Superprod Group under its animation arm Superprod Animation announced they're adaptating the book series Toto The Ninja Cat created by former host of The X Factor, British personality and Irish broadcaster Dermot O'Leary into a animated 52-episode action-comedy TV series, StudioCanal's television arm StudioCanal Television & StudioCanal's literary production arm StudioCanal Stories, one of the co-productions from the label, and Superprod Animation would co-produce while the latter handle animation production services at its Paris and Angoulême-based animation production studios while StudioCanal and Superprod's distribution unit Superights Kids & Family handle distribution to the new series, emmy-winning head writers Nick Ostler and Mark Huckerby would serve as developers & would write episode for the series and O'Heary alongside his wife Dee Koppang would executive produce.

== Production companies ==
- StudioCanal Stories - A dedicated book-to-screen adaptation label based in Paris, France that handles adaptation of famous literary novels & best-known books into film & television series.
- Sixth Dimension - a production label dedicated to genre films (similar to Screen Gems or the former Dimension Films)

== Film library ==
StudioCanal acquired film libraries from studios that either became defunct or had merged with it over the years, currently holding more than 9,000 titles as a result.

StudioCanal owns the libraries of the following companies:

- Carolco Pictures
  - The Vista Organization
  - Seven Arts (joint venture with New Line Cinema)
- Paravision International
  - Parafrance Films
  - De Laurentiis Entertainment Group
    - Embassy Pictures
- Lumiere Pictures and Television (currently owned as a result of parent company Canal+ Group's acquisition of cinema operator UGC who acquired those companies, via Weintraub Entertainment Group)
  - EMI Films
    - British Lion Films
      - Individual Pictures
      - The 1947–1955 London Films library (pre-1947 titles owned by ITV Studios)
    - Anglo-Amalgamated
      - Anglo-Amalgamated Film Distributors
    - Associated British Picture Corporation
      - ABC Weekend TV
      - Associated British Productions
      - British International Pictures
      - Ealing Studios
        - Associated Talking Pictures and Associated British Film Distributors
      - Pathé News
      - Welwyn Studios
- Almi Pictures/Television catalog
- Romulus Films
- Hammer Film Productions (distribution rights)
- Alexander Salkind/Pueblo Film Licensing (the non-Superman films not owned by Warner Bros.)
- Quad Cinema
- Regency Enterprises (TV rights only, France)
- Spyglass Entertainment (TV rights only, France, Benelux, Sweden and Poland)
- American Zoetrope (distribution rights)

=== Former agreements ===
- Miramax (most international home video releases; 2011–2020) (rights now held by Paramount Home Entertainment)
- Studio Ghibli (United Kingdom and the Republic of Ireland only; ended in December 2022) (rights now held by GKIDS and Anime Limited and formerly by Elysian Film Group and Anonymous Content until 2026)

=== Television series ===
As of 2019, StudioCanal owned the rights to over 30 television series, mostly produced by TANDEM Productions and Red Production Company, including The Avengers, Rambo: The Force of Freedom, Paranoid, Public Eye, Crazyhead, Take Two, Wanted Dead or Alive, The Adventures of Paddington (2019), and international rights to The Big Valley.

| Title | Years | Network | Notes |
|---|---|---|---|
| The Adventures of Paddington | 2019–2025 | Gulli, M6 & Piwi+ Nick Jr. UK; Nickelodeon (international) | co-production with Heyday Films, Blue Zoo Animation Studio and Superprod Animation |
| The Man Who Fell to Earth | 2022 | Showtime | co-production with CBS Studios, Secret Hideout and Timberman/Livery Productions |
| La Promesa | 2023–present | La 1 (Spain) | co-production with Bambú Producciones |
| Valle salvaje | 2024–present | La 1 (Spain) | co-production with Bambú Producciones |
| Paris Has Fallen | 2024–present | Canal+ | co-production with Urban Myth Films, Millennium Media and G-BASE |
| Playing Nice | 2025 | ITV1 | under StudioCanal TV UK co-production with Rabbit Track Pictures |
| Miffy & Friends | 2025–present | Canal+ Kids; Sky Kids (United Kingdom); NPO Zappelin (Netherlands) | co-production with Mercis BV and Superprod Animation |
| Apollo Has Fallen | TBA | Canal+ | Sequel to Paris Has Fallen co-production with Urban Myth Films, G-BASE and Millennium Media |
| Point Break | 2027 | Canal+; AMC (United States) | co-production with Alcon Entertainment and AMC Studios |
| Murder Most Unladylike | TBA | TBA | under StudioCanal Stories co-production with Strong Film & Television and Unladylike Productions |
| Toto the Ninja Cat | TBA | TBA | under StudioCanal Television; co-production with StudioCanal Stories and Superprod Animation; Based on the book series by Dermot O'Leary |

== Distribution ==
Outside France, the British Isles, Australia, New Zealand and Germany, StudioCanal does not have a formal distribution unit per se, instead relying on other distribution studios and home video distributors to handle their titles. In North America for example, The Criterion Collection, Rialto Pictures, Lionsgate Home Entertainment, Metro-Goldwyn-Mayer (for the Embassy catalog), Universal Pictures (for co-productions), Shout! Studios and Kino Lorber distribute StudioCanal's back catalogue on DVD and Blu-ray Disc (in addition, Anchor Bay Entertainment and Image Entertainment previously owned several of their titles). Sony Pictures Home Entertainment has handled distribution of StudioCanal/Hoyts Distribution films in Australia and New Zealand on DVD and Blu-ray since early 2013.

From the 1990s to early 2000s, Warner Home Video formerly handled distribution of select StudioCanal titles through the Canal+ Image label in the United Kingdom on VHS and DVD until 2006 when StudioCanal opened its own distribution unit in the UK, with titles distributed through Optimum Releasing (via Universal Pictures Home Entertainment from 2006 to 2007 and Elevation Sales since 2007).

StudioCanal had the European home video distribution rights to 550 titles from the Miramax library, shared with Lionsgate in the UK and Ireland, from 2011 to 2020, when ViacomCBS (later Paramount Global and currently Paramount Skydance Corporation) bought a minority stake in Miramax.

On 13 October 2021, StudioCanal announced that its global distribution deal with Universal would expire in January 2022.

The company had distributed 551 films and TV series on the PlayStation Store. After September 2026, users who purchased any of the media will no longer own the titles.

== Selected films produced by StudioCanal or associated companies ==
- The Doors (1991)
- Terminator 2: Judgment Day (1991)
- JFK (1991)
- The Mambo Kings (1992)
- Basic Instinct (1992)
- Universal Soldier (1992)
- Under Siege (1992)
- Chaplin (1992)
- Sommersby (1993)
- Falling Down (1993)
- Cliffhanger (1993)
- Free Willy (1993)
- Stargate (1994)
- Free Willy 2: The Adventure Home (1995)
- U-571 (2000)
- O Brother, Where Art Thou? (2000)
- Bridget Jones's Diary (2001)
- Johnny English (2003)
- Paddington (2014)
- How to Make a Killing (2026)
