= Andrew Rona =

American film producer

- Born: July 1971 (age 55); New York, U.S.
- Occupations: Film producer, movie executive, founder of The Picture Company
- Known for: Equilibrium; Non-Stop; Project X Scream; Scary Movie

Andrew Rona (born July 1971) is an American film producer and movie executive.

== Early life and education ==
Rona was born in New York, where he studied film at the School of Visual Arts.

== Career ==
=== Miramax Films (1991–1995) ===
In 1991, while a student, Rona went to work as an intern for Harvey Weinstein at Miramax Films. From there, Rona went on to become an assistant of the Weinsteins. He was then promoted to the Director of Development and Production for the new genre label "Dimension Films" in 1995.

=== Dimension Films (1995–2006) ===
Rona served as co-president of Dimension Films from 2001 to 2006, during which the company changed its focus from acquiring and co-financing lower budget pictures to producing, marketing and distributing a wider variety of films. Rona supervised more than 60 productions, ranging from thrillers like the Scream franchise, to comedies like the Scary Movie franchise and Bad Santa, and to action films such as Sin City.

=== Project Greenlight ===
In 2005, Rona appeared on Season 3 of the reality show Project Greenlight on Bravo.

=== Rogue Pictures (2005–2008) ===
In 2005, Rona joined Universal Pictures as co-president of the new label, Rogue Pictures. Rona oversaw all creative aspects of the label. During Rona's tenure as co-president, Rogue Pictures produced Shaun of the Dead, Hot Fuzz, The Strangers, Dave Chappelle's Block Party and Fighting.

=== Academy Member ===
In 2008, Rona was invited to become a member of the Executive Branch of the Academy Motion Pictures Arts and Sciences.

=== Silver Pictures (2008—2014) ===
Rona served as President of Silver Pictures, Joel Silver's production company based at Warner Bros. studios from December 2008, until January 15 2014. He was responsible for overseeing creative aspects of the company, including production and development of feature films and television. Rona also produced several other productions including Non-Stop, Sherlock Holmes, Project X, and The Gunman.

=== The Picture Company (2015–present) ===
In 2015, Rona founded the production company The Picture Company alongside Alex Heineman, with financing from European conglomerate StudioCanal. He produced the first film under The Picture Company brand, The Commuter, starring Liam Neeson, and Alpha, directed by Albert Hughes at Studio 8. In May 2023, StudioCanal purchased a minority stake in the company.
