= Redundancy in United Kingdom law =

Rights of employees if they are dismissed for economic reasons in UK labour law

Redundancy in United Kingdom law concerns the rights of employees if they are dismissed for economic reasons in UK labour law.

== Definition of redundancy ==
Section 139 of the Employment Rights Act 1996 defines the two situations in which a redundancy may occur:

(a) the fact that his employer has ceased or intends to cease—

(i) to carry on the business for the purposes of which the employee was employed by him, or

(ii) to carry on that business in the place where the employee was so employed, or

(b) the fact that the requirements of that business—

(i) for employees to carry out work of a particular kind, or

(ii) for employees to carry out work of a particular kind in the place where the employee was employed by the employer,

have ceased or diminished or are expected to cease or diminish.

=== Diminishing of work ===
The second limb has caused difficulty of interpretation. In Safeway Stores plc v Burrell the Employment Appeal Tribunal set out a three-stage test: whether the employee was dismissed, whether the requirements of the business for employees to carry out work of a particular kind had ceased or diminished, and whether the dismissal was attributable to that state of affairs — rejecting earlier approaches based on the terms of the employee's contract. The House of Lords confirmed this plain causation approach in Murray v Foyle Meats Ltd.

=== The function of the employee ===
Whether the requirements of the business have diminished is judged by the kind of work the employer needs done, not by headcount or the hours at which it is done.

In Johnson v Nottinghamshire Combined Police Authority [1974] ICR 170 the Court of Appeal held that clerks dismissed after refusing a reorganisation of their working hours were not redundant: the employer needed the same clerical work in the same quantity, and rearranging when the same work is done does not diminish the requirement for work of that kind. Such a dismissal may instead be potentially fair as one for "some other substantial reason", as in Hollister v National Farmers' Union.

By contrast, in Murphy v Epsom College [1984] IRLR 271 a plumber dismissed and replaced by a heating technician was held redundant even though overall staffing was unchanged: the college's requirement for employees to carry out work of the particular kind he did (general plumbing) had diminished, and it is the kind of work rather than the number of employees that matters.

=== The place of work ===
The "place where the employee was employed" is determined primarily as a question of fact; where the employee actually worked rather than by the terms of the contract.

In Bass Leisure Ltd v Thomas [1994] IRLR 104 the Employment Appeal Tribunal held that an employee based at a depot in Coventry was redundant when it closed, notwithstanding a contractual mobility clause under which she could be required to work elsewhere: the place of employment is established from the factual circumstances of the work, and a mobility clause cannot be relied on by the employer to extend it.

The Court of Appeal approved this approach in High Table Ltd v Horst [1997] IRLR 513, holding that waitresses who had worked at a single City of London client of their catering employer were employed at that location for redundancy purposes despite a wider mobility clause while noting that the contractual terms are not wholly irrelevant to construing the factual position.

== Redundancy procedure ==
Bessenden Properties Ltd v Corness establishes the main principles on fairness of procedure, with Williams v Compair Maxam Ltd affirming it.

=== Consultation ===
- Huddersfield Parcels Ltd v Sykes on double consultation (Dyke v Hereford and Worcester County Council affirming)
- Trade Union and Labour Relations (Consolidation) Act 1992, Section 188
- special circumstances defence

=== Selection criteria ===
- British Aerospace Plc v Green and FDR Ltd v Holloway on discovery of how criteria were applied
- Clarke v Eley Kynoch Ltd on discrimination in criteria on gender

== Redundancy payments ==
Redundancy payments are defined in law.

=== Statutory redundancy pay ===
Under section 135 of the Employment Rights Act 1996, an employee dismissed by reason of redundancy is entitled to a statutory redundancy payment if they have at least two years of continuous employment. Section 162 sets the amount: for each complete year of service, counted back from the dismissal and capped at twenty years, the employee receives one and a half weeks' pay for years worked from age 41, one week's pay for years worked between ages 22 and 40, and half a week's pay for years worked below age 22.

The week's pay used in the calculation is subject to a statutory ceiling under section 227 of the 1996 Act. Since 1999 the ceiling has been revised annually in line with the September retail prices index, as required by section 34 of the Employment Relations Act 1999, through an annual Employment Rights (Increase of Limits) Order. For dismissals on or after 6 April 2026 the limit is £751 a week, giving a maximum statutory payment of £22,530. The limit was £40 a week when the scheme was introduced by the Redundancy Payments Act 1965 - roughly twice average weekly earnings at the time, so that the formula then covered the full pay of most employees. In Northern Ireland the limit is set separately and is higher - £783 a week from April 2026, with a maximum payment of £23,490.

=== Taxation ===
A redundancy payment, including any non-contractual enhancement by the employer, is exempt from income tax up to £30,000 under section 403 of the Income Tax (Earnings and Pensions) Act 2003, with the excess taxed as employment income. Termination payments do not attract employee National Insurance contributions at any amount, although employers have paid Class 1A contributions on the excess over £30,000 since April 2020, and since April 2018 payments in lieu of notice have been taxed as ordinary earnings however the package is described. The £30,000 threshold was set by the Finance Act 1988 and has not been increased since.

=== Contractual and enhanced payments ===
Employers may pay more than the statutory minimum, and a contractual entitlement to an enhanced payment can arise expressly or by custom and practice.

In 2002, the Court of Appeal ruled in a case brought by staff employed at Albion's Farington site in Lancashire, Albion Automotive Ltd w. Walker and others, that a contractual term entitling employees to an enhanced redundancy payment could be implied into the employees' contracts of employment based on the employer's custom and practice.

However, in a different 2002 decision in the Employment Appeal Tribunal, Warman International v Wilson, Mr Wilson's claim of being entitled to an enhanced redundancy payment, supported by the Employment Tribunal meeting in Leeds in 2000, was overturned because previous enhanced levels of redundancy payment had on each occasion been made on a case-by-case decision and the employer, when making comparator payments to other staff made redundant, had specifically asserted that enhanced payments for some staff created no precedent on which other staff could subsequently rely.

== See also ==
- UK labour law
- Layoff
