= Houston Film Critics Society Award for Best Cinematography =

Annual US film award

The Houston Film Critics Society Award for Best Cinematography is an annual award given by the Houston Film Critics Society.

== Winners ==
=== 2000s ===
Year	Winner	Cinematographer(s)
2007	The Assassination of Jesse James by the Coward Robert Ford	Roger Deakins
2007	Atonement	Seamus McGarvey
2007	Into the Wild	Eric Gautier
2007	No Country for Old Men	Roger Deakins
2007	Sweeney Todd: The Demon Barber of Fleet Street	Dariusz Wolski
2008	The Curious Case of Benjamin Button	Claudio Miranda
2008	The Dark Knight	Wally Pfister
2008	Milk	Harris Savides
2008	Revolutionary Road	Roger Deakins
2008	Slumdog Millionaire	Anthony Dod Mantle
2009	The Hurt Locker	Barry Ackroyd
2009	Avatar	Mauro Fiore and Vince Pace
2009	The Lovely Bones	Andrew Lesnie
2009	Nine	Dion Beebe
2009	The Road	Javier Aguirresarobe

=== 2010s ===
Year	Winner	Cinematographer(s)
2010	Inception	Wally Pfister
2010	127 Hours	Anthony Dod Mantle and Enrique Chediak
2010	Black Swan	Matthew Libatique
2010	Harry Potter and the Deathly Hallows – Part 1	Eduardo Serra
2010	True Grit	Roger Deakins
2011	The Tree of Life	Emmanuel Lubezki
2011	The Artist	Guillaume Schiffman
2011	Drive	Newton Thomas Sigel
2011	Hugo	Robert Richardson
2011	War Horse	Janusz Kamiński
2012	Skyfall	Roger Deakins
2012	Les Misérables	Danny Cohen
2012	Life of Pi	Claudio Miranda
2012	Lincoln	Janusz Kamiński
2012	The Master	Mihai Mălaimare Jr.
2013	Gravity	Emmanuel Lubezki
2013	12 Years a Slave	Sean Bobbitt
2013	All Is Lost	Frank G. DeMarco
2013	Inside Llewyn Davis	Bruno Delbonnel
2013	Prisoners	Roger Deakins
2014	Birdman	Emmanuel Lubezki
2014	The Grand Budapest Hotel	Robert Yeoman
2014	Inherent Vice	Robert Elswit
2014	Interstellar	Hoyte van Hoytema
2014	Unbroken	Roger Deakins
2015	The Revenant	Emmanuel Lubezki
2015	The Hateful Eight	Robert Richardson
2015	Mad Max: Fury Road	John Seale
2015	The Martian	Dariusz Wolski
2015	Sicario	Roger Deakins
2016	La La Land	Linus Sandgren
2016	Arrival	Bradford Young
2016	Jackie	Stéphane Fontaine
2016	Moonlight	James Laxton
2016	Nocturnal Animals	Seamus McGarvey
2017	Blade Runner 2049	Roger Deakins
2017	Call Me by Your Name	Sayombhu Mukdeeprom
2017	Dunkirk	Hoyte van Hoytema
2017	The Shape of Water	Dan Laustsen
2017	Wonder Wheel	Vittorio Storaro
2018	Roma	Alfonso Cuarón
2018	Black Panther	Rachel Morrison
2018	The Favourite	Robbie Ryan
2018	First Man	Linus Sandgren
2018	If Beale Street Could Talk	James Laxton
2019	1917	Roger Deakins
2019	The Irishman	Rodrigo Prieto
2019	Joker	Lawrence Sher
2019	Once Upon a Time in Hollywood	Robert Richardson
2019	Parasite	Hong Kyung-pyo

=== 2020s ===
Year	Winner	Cinematographer(s)
2020	Nomadland	Joshua James Richards
2020	Mank	Erik Messerschmidt
2020	Minari	Lachlan Milne
2020	News of the World	Dariusz Wolski
2020	Tenet	Hoyte van Hoytema
2021	Dune	Greig Fraser
2021	Nightmare Alley	Dan Laustsen
2021	The Power of the Dog	Ari Wegner
2021	The Tragedy of Macbeth	Bruno Delbonnel
2021	West Side Story	Janusz Kamiński
2022	Top Gun: Maverick	Claudio Miranda
2022	Avatar: The Way of Water	Russell Carpenter
2022	Babylon	Linus Sandgren
2022	The Fabelmans	Janusz Kamiński
2022	Nope	Hoyte van Hoytema
2023	Oppenheimer	Hoyte van Hoytema
2023	Barbie	Rodrigo Prieto
2023	Killers of the Flower Moon	Rodrigo Prieto
2023	Poor Things	Robbie Ryan
2023	Saltburn	Linus Sandgren
