= Pentagram (Raised by Wolves) =

- Raised by Wolves episode
- Tempest confides in Mother.
- Episode no.: Season 1 Episode 2
- Directed by: Ridley Scott
- Written by: Aaron Guzikowski
- Cinematography by: Dariusz Wolski
- Editing by: Claire Simpson
- Original air date: September 3, 2020
- Running time: 42 minutes

Episode chronology
← Previous "Raised by Wolves"	Next → "Virtual Faith"

"Pentagram" is the second episode of the first season of the HBO Max science fiction drama television series Raised by Wolves. The episode was directed by Ridley Scott and written by series creator Aaron Guzikowski.

== Plot ==
In 2145, during the Battle of Boston, atheist soldier Caleb (Jack Hawkins) and his wife Mary (Sienna Guillory) decide to impersonate Mithraic captain Marcus and his wife Sue, respectively, in order to escape Earth. Medical android Albert (Carel Nel) performs plastic surgery to match the couple's physical appearances to those of the Mithraics. After assassinating the real Marcus (Travis Fimmel) and Sue (Niamh Algar) at their residence, they board the spacecraft Heaven, where they find the deceased couple's son Paul (Felix Jamieson).

Back in the present on Kepler-22b, Mother (Amanda Collin) replaces her eyes—the source of her extreme powers—with those of a Mithraic android; she also revives Father (Abubakar Salim) with its heart. They return to taking care of their son Campion (Winta McGrath), as well as five Mithraic children: Hunter (Ethan Hazzard), Tempest (Jordan Loughran), Holly (Aasiya Shah), Vita (Ivy Wong), and Paul. Tempest later confides to Mother that she is pregnant with the child of a Mithraic priest who raped her on Heaven. Unidentified desert creatures attack the farm but are killed by Mother after she reclaims her original eyes that were momentarily stolen by an untrusting Campion. Having survived Mother's earlier assault, Marcus falls asleep next to a hole after tying himself to a nearby rock. The same creatures spot him and knock him off the edge. However, he manages to avoid serious injury and is later rescued by another Mithraic team.

== Production ==
"Pentagram" was directed by Ridley Scott. The screenplay was written by Aaron Guzikowski. Filming took place in South Africa.

== Release ==
"Pentagram" premiered on September 3, 2020 on the subscription video on demand streaming service HBO Max.

== Reception ==
In her review for The A.V. Club, Arielle Bernstein wrote that the main theme of "Pentagram" was "whether we have the ability to forge a new identity": "viewers (are invited) to explore if we are merely the products of what came before, or if we are able to ultimately make our own choices." She gave the episode a B+. Sean Collins of the pop culture website Decider described the episode as "really, really good" and said that it "lives up to the promise of the premiere".
