= American Society of Cinematographers Award for Outstanding Achievement in Cinematography in Theatrical Releases =

Film award

The following is a list of cinematographers who have won and been nominated for the American Society of Cinematographers Award for Outstanding Achievement in Theatrical Releases, which is given annually by the American Society of Cinematographers.

== Winners and nominees ==
Table key
	Indicates the winner
†	Indicates a posthumous winner
†	Indicates a posthumous nominee
‡	Indicates the Academy Award winner

=== 1980s ===
Year	Film	Cinematographer
1986	Peggy Sue Got Married	Jordan Cronenweth
1986	The Karate Kid Part II	James Crabe
1986	The Mission ‡	Chris Menges
1986	A Room with a View	Tony Pierce-Roberts
1986	Star Trek IV: The Voyage Home	Donald Peterman
1987	Empire of the Sun	Allen Daviau
1987	The Last Emperor ‡	Vittorio Storaro
1987	Matewan	Haskell Wexler
1987	Someone to Watch Over Me	Steven Poster
1987	The Untouchables	Stephen H. Burum
1988	Tequila Sunrise	Conrad L. Hall
1988	Dangerous Liaisons	Philippe Rousselot
1988	Mississippi Burning ‡	Peter Biziou
1988	Rain Man	John Seale
1988	The Unbearable Lightness of Being	Sven Nykvist
1989	Blaze	Haskell Wexler
1989	The Abyss	Mikael Salomon
1989	The Bear	Philippe Rousselot
1989	Born on the Fourth of July	Robert Richardson
1989	The War of the Roses	Stephen H. Burum

=== 1990s ===
Year	Film	Cinematographer
1990	Dances with Wolves ‡	Dean Semler
1990	Avalon	Allen Daviau
1990	Dick Tracy	Vittorio Storaro
1990	Ghost	Adam Greenberg
1990	The Godfather Part III	Gordon Willis
1991	Bugsy	Allen Daviau
1991	Hook	Dean Cundey
1991	JFK ‡	Robert Richardson
1991	The Prince of Tides	Stephen Goldblatt
1991	Terminator 2: Judgment Day	Adam Greenberg
1992	Hoffa	Stephen H. Burum
1992	A Few Good Men	Robert Richardson
1992	Howards End	Tony Pierce-Roberts
1992	The Last of the Mohicans	Dante Spinotti
1992	A River Runs Through It ‡	Philippe Rousselot
1993	Searching for Bobby Fischer	Conrad L. Hall
1993	The Fugitive	Michael Chapman
1993	Heaven & Earth	Robert Richardson
1993	The Piano	Stuart Dryburgh
1993	Schindler's List ‡	Janusz Kamiński
1994	The Shawshank Redemption	Roger Deakins
1994	Forrest Gump	Don Burgess
1994	Legends of the Fall ‡	John Toll
1994	Love Affair	Conrad L. Hall
1994	Wyatt Earp	Owen Roizman
1995	Braveheart ‡	John Toll
1995	Apollo 13	Dean Cundey
1995	Batman Forever	Stephen Goldblatt
1995	The Bridges of Madison County	Jack N. Green
1995	Crimson Tide	Dariusz Wolski
1995	Se7en	Darius Khondji
1996	The English Patient ‡	John Seale
1996	Evita	Darius Khondji
1996	Fargo	Roger Deakins
1996	Fly Away Home	Caleb Deschanel
1996	The Ghost and the Darkness	Vilmos Zsigmond
1996	Michael Collins	Chris Menges
1997	Titanic ‡	Russell Carpenter
1997	Amistad	Janusz Kamiński
1997	The Boxer	Chris Menges
1997	Kundun	Roger Deakins
1997	L.A. Confidential	Dante Spinotti
1998	The Thin Red Line	John Toll
1998	Elizabeth	Remi Adefarasin
1998	The Horse Whisperer	Robert Richardson
1998	Saving Private Ryan ‡	Janusz Kamiński
1998	Shakespeare in Love	Richard Greatrex
1999	American Beauty ‡	Conrad L. Hall
1999	The Insider	Dante Spinotti
1999	The Sixth Sense	Tak Fujimoto
1999	Sleepy Hollow	Emmanuel Lubezki
1999	Snow Falling on Cedars	Robert Richardson

=== 2000s ===
Year	Film	Cinematographer(s)
2000	The Patriot	Caleb Deschanel
2000	Crouching Tiger, Hidden Dragon ‡	Peter Pau
2000	Gladiator	John Mathieson
2000	O Brother, Where Art Thou?	Roger Deakins
2000	The Perfect Storm	John Seale
2001	The Man Who Wasn't There	Roger Deakins
2001	Amélie	Bruno Delbonnel
2001	The Lord of the Rings: The Fellowship of the Ring ‡	Andrew Lesnie
2001	Moulin Rouge!	Don McAlpine
2001	Pearl Harbor	John Schwartzman
2002	Road to Perdition ‡ †	Conrad L. Hall (posthumous)
2002	Far from Heaven	Edward Lachman
2002	Frida	Rodrigo Prieto
2002	Gangs of New York	Michael Ballhaus
2002	The Pianist	Paweł Edelman
2003	Seabiscuit	John Schwartzman
2003	Cold Mountain	John Seale
2003	The Last Samurai	John Toll
2003	The Lord of the Rings: The Return of the King	Andrew Lesnie
2003	Master and Commander: The Far Side of the World ‡	Russell Boyd
2004	A Very Long Engagement	Bruno Delbonnel
2004	The Aviator ‡	Robert Richardson
2004	Collateral	Dion Beebe and Paul Cameron
2004	The Passion of the Christ	Caleb Deschanel
2004	Ray	Paweł Edelman
2005	Memoirs of a Geisha ‡	Dion Beebe
2005	Batman Begins	Wally Pfister
2005	Brokeback Mountain	Rodrigo Prieto
2005	Good Night, and Good Luck.	Robert Elswit
2005	King Kong	Andrew Lesnie
2006	Children of Men	Emmanuel Lubezki
2006	Apocalypto	Dean Semler
2006	The Black Dahlia	Vilmos Zsigmond
2006	The Good Shepherd	Robert Richardson
2006	The Illusionist	Dick Pope
2007	There Will Be Blood ‡	Robert Elswit
2007	The Assassination of Jesse James by the Coward Robert Ford	Roger Deakins
2007	Atonement	Seamus McGarvey
2007	The Diving Bell and the Butterfly	Janusz Kamiński
2007	No Country for Old Men	Roger Deakins
2008	Slumdog Millionaire ‡	Anthony Dod Mantle
2008	The Curious Case of Benjamin Button	Claudio Miranda
2008	The Dark Knight	Wally Pfister
2008	The Reader	Roger Deakins and Chris Menges
2008	Revolutionary Road	Roger Deakins
2009	The White Ribbon	Christian Berger
2009	Avatar ‡	Mauro Fiore
2009	The Hurt Locker	Barry Ackroyd
2009	Inglourious Basterds	Robert Richardson
2009	Nine	Dion Beebe

=== 2010s ===
Year	Film	Cinematographer
2010	Inception ‡	Wally Pfister
2010	Black Swan	Matthew Libatique
2010	The King's Speech	Danny Cohen
2010	The Social Network	Jeff Cronenweth
2010	True Grit	Roger Deakins
2011	The Tree of Life	Emmanuel Lubezki
2011	The Artist	Guillaume Schiffman
2011	The Girl with the Dragon Tattoo	Jeff Cronenweth
2011	Hugo ‡	Robert Richardson
2011	Tinker Tailor Soldier Spy	Hoyte van Hoytema
2012	Skyfall	Roger Deakins
2012	Anna Karenina	Seamus McGarvey
2012	Les Misérables	Danny Cohen
2012	Life of Pi ‡	Claudio Miranda
2012	Lincoln	Janusz Kamiński
2013	Gravity ‡	Emmanuel Lubezki
2013	12 Years a Slave	Sean Bobbitt
2013	Captain Phillips	Barry Ackroyd
2013	The Grandmaster	Philippe Le Sourd
2013	Inside Llewyn Davis	Bruno Delbonnel
2013	Nebraska	Phedon Papamichael
2013	Prisoners	Roger Deakins
2014	Birdman or (The Unexpected Virtue of Ignorance) ‡	Emmanuel Lubezki
2014	The Grand Budapest Hotel	Robert Yeoman
2014	The Imitation Game	Óscar Faura
2014	Mr. Turner	Dick Pope
2014	Unbroken	Roger Deakins
2015	The Revenant ‡	Emmanuel Lubezki
2015	Bridge of Spies	Janusz Kamiński
2015	Carol	Edward Lachman
2015	Mad Max: Fury Road	John Seale
2015	Sicario	Roger Deakins
2016	Lion	Greig Fraser
2016	Arrival	Bradford Young
2016	La La Land ‡	Linus Sandgren
2016	Moonlight	James Laxton
2016	Silence	Rodrigo Prieto
2017	Blade Runner 2049 ‡	Roger Deakins
2017	Darkest Hour	Bruno Delbonnel
2017	Dunkirk	Hoyte van Hoytema
2017	Mudbound	Rachel Morrison
2017	The Shape of Water	Dan Laustsen
2018	Cold War	Łukasz Żal
2018	The Favourite	Robbie Ryan
2018	First Man	Linus Sandgren
2018	Roma ‡	Alfonso Cuarón
2018	A Star Is Born	Matthew Libatique
2019	1917 ‡	Roger Deakins
2019	Ford v Ferrari	Phedon Papamichael
2019	The Irishman	Rodrigo Prieto
2019	Joker	Lawrence Sher
2019	Once Upon a Time in Hollywood	Robert Richardson

=== 2020s ===
Year	Film	Cinematographer
2020	Mank ‡	Erik Messerschmidt
2020	Cherry	Newton Thomas Sigel
2020	News of the World	Dariusz Wolski
2020	Nomadland	Joshua James Richards
2020	The Trial of the Chicago 7	Phedon Papamichael
2021	Dune ‡	Greig Fraser
2021	Belfast	Haris Zambarloukos
2021	Nightmare Alley	Dan Laustsen
2021	The Power of the Dog	Ari Wegner
2021	The Tragedy of Macbeth	Bruno Delbonnel
2022	Elvis	Mandy Walker
2022	Bardo, False Chronicle of a Handful of Truths	Darius Khondji
2022	The Batman	Greig Fraser
2022	Empire of Light	Roger Deakins
2022	Top Gun: Maverick	Claudio Miranda
2023	Oppenheimer ‡	Hoyte van Hoytema
2023	El Conde	Edward Lachman
2023	Killers of the Flower Moon	Rodrigo Prieto
2023	Maestro	Matthew Libatique
2023	Poor Things	Robbie Ryan
2024	Maria	Edward Lachman
2024	The Brutalist ‡	Lol Crawley
2024	A Complete Unknown	Phedon Papamichael
2024	Conclave	Stéphane Fontaine
2024	Dune: Part Two	Greig Fraser
2024	Nosferatu	Jarin Blaschke
2024	Wicked	Alice Brooks
2025	One Battle After Another	Michael Bauman
2025	Frankenstein	Dan Laustsen
2025	Marty Supreme	Darius Khondji
2025	Sinners ‡	Autumn Durald Arkapaw
2025	Train Dreams	Adolpho Veloso

== Multiple wins ==
5 wins

- Roger Deakins
- Emmanuel Lubezki (3 consecutive)

4 wins

- Conrad L. Hall

2 wins

- Allen Daviau
- John Toll
- Greig Fraser

== Multiple nominations ==
17 nominations

- Roger Deakins

11 nominations

- Robert Richardson

6 nominations

- Janusz Kamiński
- Emmanuel Lubezki

5 nominations

- Bruno Delbonnel
- Conrad L. Hall
- Rodrigo Prieto
- John Schwartzman
- John Seale
- Dean Semler

4 nominations

- Greig Fraser
- Darius Khondji
- Edward Lachman
- Chris Menges
- Phedon Papamichael
- John Toll
- Haskell Wexler

3 nominations

- Dion Beebe
- Stephen H. Burum
- Caleb Deschanel
- Dan Laustsen
- Andrew Lesnie
- Matthew Libatique
- Claudio Miranda
- Wally Pfister
- Philippe Rousselot
- Dante Spinotti
- Hoyte van Hoytema

2 nominations

- Barry Ackroyd
- Danny Cohen
- Jeff Cronenweth
- Dean Cundey
- Allen Daviau
- Paweł Edelman
- Robert Elswit
- Stephen Goldblatt
- Adam Greenberg
- Seamus McGarvey
- Tony Pierce-Roberts
- Dick Pope
- Robbie Ryan
- Linus Sandgren
- Vittorio Storaro
- Dariusz Wolski
- Vilmos Zsigmond

== See also ==
- AACTA Award for Best Cinematography
- Academy Award for Best Cinematography
- BAFTA Award for Best Cinematography
- Critics' Choice Movie Award for Best Cinematography
- Independent Spirit Award for Best Cinematography
- Satellite Award for Best Cinematography
