= Virtual Faith =

- Raised by Wolves episode
- Ambrose speaks with Marcus.
- Episode no.: Season 1 Episode 3
- Directed by: Luke Scott
- Written by: Aaron Guzikowski
- Cinematography by: Ross Emery
- Editing by: Michael Ruscio
- Original air date: September 3, 2020
- Running time: 48 minutes

Episode chronology
← Previous "Pentagram"	Next → "Nature's Course"

"Virtual Faith" is the third episode of the first season of the HBO Max science fiction drama television series Raised by Wolves. The episode was directed by Luke Scott and written by series creator Aaron Guzikowski.

== Plot ==
Ten years ago, the Mithraic spacecraft Heaven was launched carrying a thousand passengers to colonize Kepler-22b. While in a state of suspended animation, they are able to engage in telepathy in virtual reality. Back in the present, Marcus (Travis Fimmel), having awoken from his concussion, finds himself at the ark's crash site with Sue (Niamh Algar) and a handful of other Mithraic survivors. Marcus postulates that Mother is a reprogrammed "necromancer" android, but de facto Mithraic leader Ambrose (Steve Wall) declines to send soldiers to rescue the children. While discussing Paul's safety with Sue, Marcus recalls his violent youth as an atheist soldier whose partner was killed in action. Almost ambushed by Mother while scavenging for supplies, the survivors hide underground. A Mithraic android (Awissi Lakou) is sent back up to distract Mother and is swiftly destroyed.

Back on the plantation, Campion (Winta McGrath) locks Father in a shed and alleges to the other children that Mother has poisoned them. They flee in search of the crash site, but Paul (Felix Jamieson) becomes separated from the rest while searching for his pet mouse. Father escapes from the shed; while refueling their landing craft with biofuel from their crops, he inadvertently discovers that their pits are radioactive and deduces that Campion's siblings may have died of acute radiation syndrome. While Mother searches for Paul, Father tracks down five of the children and convinces Campion of Mother's innocence. Campion is nearly attacked by an unidentified creature; Father comes to his rescue and is wounded in the neck. Alone in the forest, Paul follows a child-like apparition and falls into a hole, landing on a thick branch.

== Production ==
"Virtual Faith" was directed by Luke Scott. The screenplay was written by Aaron Guzikowski. Filming took place in South Africa.

== Release ==
"Virtual Faith" premiered on September 3, 2020 on the subscription video on demand streaming service HBO Max.

== Reception ==
Erik Kain of Forbes wrote that "this was another great episode of Raised By Wolves". Sean Collins, writing for the pop culture website Decider, described "Virtual Faith" as "a latticework of mirrored conflicts between faith and doubt, biological and chosen families, and the simple need to believe that what people you love say to you is true." Arielle Bernstein of The A.V. Club gave the episode an A−.
