= Critics' Choice Movie Award for Best Cinematography =

Award given by the Broadcast Film Critics Association

The Critics' Choice Movie Award for Best Cinematography is one of the awards given to people working in the motion picture industry by the Broadcast Film Critics Association at their annual Critics' Choice Movie Awards. It was first presented in 2009.

== List of winners and nominees ==
indicates the winner

=== 2000s ===
Year	Film	Nominee	Ref.
2009	Avatar	Mauro Fiore	
2009	The Hurt Locker	Barry Ackroyd	
2009	Inglourious Basterds	Robert Richardson	
2009	The Lovely Bones	Andrew Lesnie	
2009	Nine	Dion Beebe	

=== 2010s ===
Year	Film	Nominee	Ref.
2010	Inception	Wally Pfister	
2010	127 Hours	Anthony Dod Mantle and Enrique Chediak	
2010	Black Swan	Matthew Libatique	
2010	The King's Speech	Danny Cohen	
2010	True Grit	Roger Deakins	
2011	The Tree of Life	Emmanuel Lubezki (TIE)	
2011	War Horse	Janusz Kamiński (TIE)	
2011	The Artist	Guillaume Schiffman	
2011	Drive	Newton Thomas Sigel	
2011	Hugo	Robert Richardson	
2012	Life of Pi	Claudio Miranda	
2012	Les Misérables	Danny Cohen	
2012	Lincoln	Janusz Kamiński	
2012	The Master	Mihai Mălaimare Jr.	
2012	Skyfall	Roger Deakins	
2013	Gravity	Emmanuel Lubezki	
2013	12 Years a Slave	Sean Bobbitt	
2013	Inside Llewyn Davis	Bruno Delbonnel	
2013	Nebraska	Phedon Papamichael	
2013	Prisoners	Roger Deakins	
2014	Birdman	Emmanuel Lubezki	
2014	The Grand Budapest Hotel	Robert Yeoman	
2014	Interstellar	Hoyte van Hoytema	
2014	Mr. Turner	Dick Pope	
2014	Unbroken	Roger Deakins	
2015	The Revenant	Emmanuel Lubezki	
2015	Carol	Edward Lachman	
2015	The Hateful Eight	Robert Richardson	
2015	Mad Max: Fury Road	John Seale	
2015	The Martian	Dariusz Wolski	
2015	Sicario	Roger Deakins	
2016	La La Land	Linus Sandgren	
2016	Arrival	Bradford Young	
2016	Jackie	Stéphane Fontaine	
2016	Moonlight	James Laxton	
2016	Nocturnal Animals	Seamus McGarvey	
2017	Blade Runner 2049	Roger Deakins	
2017	Call Me by Your Name	Sayombhu Mukdeeprom	
2017	Dunkirk	Hoyte van Hoytema	
2017	Mudbound	Rachel Morrison	
2017	The Shape of Water	Dan Laustsen	
2018	Roma	Alfonso Cuarón	
2018	Black Panther	Rachel Morrison	
2018	The Favourite	Robbie Ryan	
2018	First Man	Linus Sandgren	
2018	If Beale Street Could Talk	James Laxton	
2018	A Star Is Born	Matthew Libatique	
2019	1917	Roger Deakins	
2019	Ford v Ferrari	Phedon Papamichael	
2019	The Irishman	Rodrigo Prieto	
2019	Joker	Lawrence Sher	
2019	The Lighthouse	Jarin Blaschke	
2019	Once Upon a Time in Hollywood	Robert Richardson	

=== 2020s ===
Year	Film	Nominee	Ref.
2020	Nomadland	Joshua James Richards	
2020	Da 5 Bloods	Newton Thomas Sigel	
2020	First Cow	Christopher Blauvelt	
2020	Mank	Erik Messerschmidt	
2020	Minari	Lachlan Milne	
2020	News of the World	Dariusz Wolski	
2020	Tenet	Hoyte van Hoytema	
2021	The Power of the Dog	Ari Wegner	
2021	Belfast	Haris Zambarloukos	
2021	Dune	Greig Fraser	
2021	Nightmare Alley	Dan Laustsen	
2021	The Tragedy of Macbeth	Bruno Delbonnel	
2021	West Side Story	Janusz Kaminski	
2022	Top Gun: Maverick	Claudio Miranda	
2022	Avatar: The Way of Water	Russell Carpenter	
2022	Babylon	Linus Sandgren	
2022	Empire of Light	Roger Deakins	
2022	The Fabelmans	Janusz Kamiński	
2022	Tár	Florian Hoffmeister	
2023	Oppenheimer	Hoyte van Hoytema	
2023	Barbie	Rodrigo Prieto	
2023	Killers of the Flower Moon	Rodrigo Prieto	
2023	Maestro	Matthew Libatique	
2023	Poor Things	Robbie Ryan	
2023	Saltburn	Linus Sandgren	
2024	Nosferatu	Jarin Blaschke	
2024	The Brutalist	Lol Crawley	
2024	Conclave	Stéphane Fontaine	
2024	Dune: Part Two	Greig Fraser	
2024	Nickel Boys	Jomo Fray	
2024	Wicked	Alice Brooks	
2025	Train Dreams	Adolpho Veloso	
2025	F1	Claudio Miranda	
2025	Frankenstein	Dan Laustsen	
2025	Hamnet	Łukasz Żal	
2025	One Battle After Another	Michael Bauman	
2025	Sinners	Autumn Durald Arkapaw	

== See also ==
- Academy Award for Best Cinematography
- BAFTA Award for Best Cinematography
- Independent Spirit Award for Best Cinematography
- Satellite Award for Best Cinematography
