= Washington D.C. Area Film Critics Association Award for Best Cinematography =

Annual US film award

The Washington D.C. Area Film Critics Association Award for Best Cinematography is an annual award given by the Washington D.C. Area Film Critics Association.

== Winners and nominees ==
=== 2010s ===
Year	Cinematographer(s)	Film
2010	Wally Pfister	Inception
2010	Jeff Cronenweth	The Social Network
2010	Roger Deakins	True Grit
2010	Anthony Dod Mantle and Enrique Chediak	127 Hours
2010	Matthew Libatique	Black Swan
2011	Emmanuel Lubezki	The Tree of Life
2011	Manuel Alberto Claro	Melancholia
2011	Janusz Kamiński	War Horse
2011	Robert Richardson	Hugo
2011	Guillaume Schiffman	The Artist
2012	Claudio Miranda	Life of Pi
2012	Danny Cohen	Les Misérables
2012	Roger Deakins	Skyfall
2012	Greig Fraser	Zero Dark Thirty
2012	Mihai Mălaimare Jr.	The Master
2013	Emmanuel Lubezki	Gravity
2013	Sean Bobbitt	12 Years a Slave
2013	Bruno Delbonnel	Inside Llewyn Davis
2013	Simon Duggan	The Great Gatsby
2013	Hoyte van Hoytema	Her
2014	Emmanuel Lubezki	Birdman or (The Unexpected Virtue of Ignorance)
2014	Roger Deakins	Unbroken
2014	Hoyte van Hoytema	Interstellar
2014	Daniel Landin	Under the Skin
2014	Robert Yeoman	The Grand Budapest Hotel
2015	Emmanuel Lubezki	The Revenant
2015	Yves Bélanger	Brooklyn
2015	Roger Deakins	Sicario
2015	Edward Lachman	Carol
2015	John Seale	Mad Max: Fury Road
2016	Linus Sandgren	La La Land
2016	Stéphane Fontaine	Jackie
2016	James Laxton	Moonlight
2016	Seamus McGarvey	Nocturnal Animals
2016	Bradford Young	Arrival
2017	Roger Deakins	Blade Runner 2049
2017	Hoyte van Hoytema	Dunkirk
2017	Dan Laustsen	The Shape of Water
2017	Rachel Morrison	Mudbound
2017	Sayombhu Mukdeeprom	Call Me by Your Name
2018	Alfonso Cuarón	Roma
2018	James Laxton	If Beale Street Could Talk
2018	Matthew Libatique	A Star is Born
2018	Robbie Ryan	The Favourite
2018	Linus Sandgren	First Man
2019	Roger Deakins	1917
2019	Jarin Blaschke	The Lighthouse
2019	Drew Daniels	Waves
2019	Rodrigo Prieto	The Irishman
2019	Robert Richardson	Once Upon a Time...in Hollywood

=== 2020s ===
Year	Cinematographer(s)	Film
2020	Joshua James Richards	Nomadland
2020	Newton Thomas Sigel	Da 5 Bloods
2020	Erik Messerschmidt	Mank
2020	Dariusz Wolski	News of the World
2020	Hoyte van Hoytema	Tenet
2021	Greig Fraser	Dune
2021	Haris Zambarloukos	Belfast
2021	Andrew Droz Palermo	The Green Knight
2021	Ari Wegner	The Power of the Dog
2021	Bruno Delbonnel	The Tragedy of Macbeth
2022	Claudio Miranda	Top Gun: Maverick
2022	Roger Deakins	Empire of Light
2022	Larkin Seiple	Everything Everywhere All at Once
2022	Janusz Kaminski	The Fablemans
2022	Hoyte van Hoytema	Nope
2023	Hoyte van Hoytema	Oppenheimer
2023	Rodrigo Prieto	Barbie
2023	Rodrigo Prieto	Killers of the Flower Moon
2023	Janusz Kaminski	Maestro
2023	Robbie Ryan	Poor Things
2024	Jarin Blaschke	Nosferatu
2024	Lol Crawley	The Brutalist
2024	Stéphane Fontaine	Conclave
2024	Greig Fraser	Dune: Part Two
2024	Jomo Fray	Nickel Boys

== Multiple wins ==
- Emmanuel Lubezki - 4
- Roger Deakins - 2
- Claudio Miranda - 2
