= Online Film Critics Society Award for Best Cinematography =

Annual film award

The Online Film Critics Society Award for Best Cinematography is an annual film award given by the Online Film Critics Society to honor the best cinematography of the year.

== Winners ==
=== 1990s ===
Year	Winner	Cinematographer(s)
1998	Saving Private Ryan	Janusz Kamiński
1998	Pleasantville	John Lindley
1998	The Thin Red Line	John Toll
1999	Sleepy Hollow	Emmanuel Lubezki
1999	American Beauty	Conrad L. Hall
1999	Eyes Wide Shut	Larry Smith
1999	The Straight Story	Freddie Francis
1999	Three Kings	Newton Thomas Sigel

=== 2000s ===
Year	Winner	Cinematographer(s)
2000	Crouching Tiger, Hidden Dragon (Wo hu cang long)	Peter Pau
2000	Gladiator	John Mathieson
2000	O Brother, Where Art Thou?	Roger Deakins
2000	Requiem for a Dream	Matthew Libatique
2000	Traffic	Steven Soderbergh
2001	The Man Who Wasn't There	Roger Deakins
2001	A.I. Artificial Intelligence	Janusz Kaminski
2001	The Lord of the Rings: The Fellowship of the Ring	Andrew Lesnie
2001	Moulin Rouge!	Donald McAlpine
2001	Mulholland Drive	Peter Deming
2002	Far from Heaven	Edward Lachman
2002	Gangs of New York	Michael Ballhaus
2002	The Lord of the Rings: The Two Towers	Andrew Lesnie
2002	Minority Report	Janusz Kaminski
2002	Road to Perdition	Conrad L. Hall
2003	The Lord of the Rings: The Return of the King	Andrew Lesnie
2003	Girl with a Pearl Earring	Eduardo Serra
2003	Kill Bill: Vol. 1	Robert Richardson
2003	The Last Samurai	John Toll
2003	Winged Migration	Olli Barbé
2004	Hero (Ying xiong)	Christopher Doyle
2004	The Aviator	Robert Richardson
2004	Collateral	Dion Beebe and Paul Cameron
2004	Eternal Sunshine of the Spotless Mind	Ellen Kuras
2004	House of Flying Daggers	Xiaoding Zhao
2005	Sin City	Robert Rodriguez
2005	2046	Christopher Doyle, Pung-Leung Kwan, and Lai Yiu-fai
2005	Brokeback Mountain	Rodrigo Prieto
2005	Good Night, and Good Luck	Robert Elswit
2005	The New World	Emmanuel Lubezki
2006	Children of Men	Emmanuel Lubezki
2006	Apocalypto	Dean Semler
2006	Babel	Rodrigo Prieto
2006	The Fountain	Matthew Libatique
2006	Pan’s Labyrinth	Guillermo Navarro
2007	No Country for Old Men	Roger Deakins
2007	The Assassination of Jesse James by the Coward Robert Ford	Roger Deakins
2007	Atonement	Seamus McGarvey
2007	The Diving Bell and the Butterfly	Janusz Kaminski
2007	There Will Be Blood	Robert Elswit
2008	The Dark Knight	Wally Pfister
2008	Australia	Mandy Walker
2008	Che	Peter Andrews
2008	The Fall	Colin Watkinson
2008	Slumdog Millionaire	Anthony Dod Mantle
2009	Inglourious Basterds	Robert Richardson
2009	Avatar	Mauro Fiore
2009	District 9	Trent Opaloch
2009	The Hurt Locker	Barry Ackroyd
2009	A Serious Man	Roger Deakins

=== 2010s ===
Year	Winner	Cinematographer(s)
2010	True Grit	Roger Deakins
2010	127 Hours	Anthony Dod Mantle & Enrique Chediak
2010	Black Swan	Matthew Libatique
2010	Inception	Wally Pfister
2010	Shutter Island	Robert Richardson
2011	The Tree of Life	Emmanuel Lubezki
2011	The Artist	Guillaume Schiffman
2011	Drive	Newton Thomas Sigel
2011	Hugo	Robert Richardson
2011	Melancholia	Manuel Alberto Claro
2012	Skyfall	Roger Deakins
2012	Life of Pi	Claudio Miranda
2012	Lincoln	Janusz Kaminski
2012	The Master	Mihai Malamiare Jr.
2012	Moonrise Kingdom	Robert D. Yeoman
2013	Gravity	Emmanuel Lubezki
2013	12 Years a Slave	Sean Bobbitt
2013	The Grandmaster	Philippe Le Sourd
2013	The Great Beauty	Luca Bigazzi
2013	Inside Llewyn Davis	Bruno Delbonnel
2014	The Grand Budapest Hotel	Robert Yeoman
2014	Birdman	Emmanuel Lubezki
2014	Ida	Łukasz Żal & Ryszard Lenczewski
2014	Mr. Turner	Dick Pope
2014	Under the Skin	Daniel Landin
2015	Mad Max: Fury Road	John Seale
2015	The Assassin	Mark Lee Ping Bing
2015	Carol	Edward Lachman
2015	The Revenant	Emmanuel Lubezki
2015	Sicario	Roger Deakins
2016	La La Land	Linus Sandgren
2016	Arrival	Bradford Young
2016	Jackie	Stéphane Fontaine
2016	Moonlight	James Laxton
2016	The Neon Demon	Natasha Braier
2017	Blade Runner 2049	Roger Deakins
2017	Dunkirk	Hoyte van Hoytema
2017	The Lost City of Z	Darius Khondji
2017	Mudbound	Rachel Morrison
2017	The Shape of Water	Dan Laustsen
2018	Roma	Alfonso Cuarón
2018	Cold War	Lukasz Zal
2018	The Favourite	Robbie Ryan
2018	First Man	Linus Sandgren
2018	If Beale Street Could Talk	James Laxton
2019	1917	Roger Deakins
2019	The Irishman	Rodrigo Prieto
2019	The Lighthouse	Jarin Blaschke
2019	Once Upon a Time… in Hollywood	Robert Richardson
2019	Portrait of a Lady on Fire	Claire Mathon

=== 2020s ===
Year	Winner	Cinematographer(s)
2020	Nomadland	Joshua James Richards
2020	Da 5 Bloods	Newton Thomas Sigel
2020	First Cow	Christopher Blauvelt
2020	Mank	Erik Messerschmidt
2020	Tenet	Hoyte Van Hoytema
2021	The Power of the Dog	Ari Wegner
2021	Dune	Greig Fraser
2021	The Green Knight	Andrew Droz Palermo
2021	The Tragedy of Macbeth	Bruno Delbonnel
2021	West Side Story	Janusz Kamiński
2022	Top Gun: Maverick	Claudio Miranda
2022	The Banshees of Inisherin	Ben Davis
2022	The Fabelmans	Janusz Kamiński
2022	Nope	Hoyte van Hoytema
2022	Tár	Florian Hoffmeister
2023	Oppenheimer	Hoyte van Hoytema
2023	Asteroid City	Robert Yeoman
2023	Barbie	Rodrigo Prieto
2023	Killers of the Flower Moon	Rodrigo Prieto
2023	Poor Things	Robbie Ryan
2024	Dune: Part Two	Greig Fraser
2024	The Brutalist	Lol Crawley
2024	Conclave	Stéphane Fontaine
2024	Nickel Boys	Jomo Fray
2024	Nosferatu	Jarin Blaschke
