= Raised by Wolves (Raised by Wolves episode) =

- Raised by Wolves episode
- Father erects a headstone for Tally, while Mother and the children look on.
- Episode no.: Season 1 Episode 1
- Directed by: Ridley Scott
- Written by: Aaron Guzikowski
- Cinematography by: Dariusz Wolski
- Editing by: Claire Simpson
- Original air date: September 3, 2020
- Running time: 53 minutes

Episode chronology
← Previous —	Next → "Pentagram"

"Raised by Wolves" is the first episode of the first season of the HBO Max science fiction drama television series Raised by Wolves. The episode was directed by Ridley Scott and written by series creator Aaron Guzikowski.

== Plot ==
Two androids, Mother (Amanda Collin) and Father (Abubakar Salim), escape a war-ravaged Earth, taking with them twelve human embryos. Their spacecraft crash-lands into a hole in the planet Kepler-22b. After setting up camp in the desert, Mother hooks herself up to artificial umbilical cords to allow six fetuses to grow. Nine months later, the children are born, the youngest of whom initially appears stillborn; Mother and Father name him Campion, after their creator. One of their daughters, Tally, is presumed dead after falling into a hole, while three other children die of illness. Four years later, only Mother, Father, Campion (Winta McGrath), and his sister, Spiria (Bronte Carmichael), remain. Mother begins teaching her children about atheism and a religious order on Earth known as the Mithraic; having been programmed by atheists, she emphasizes that their new colony on Kepler-22b must be rooted in science, rather than "fantasy". Spiria dies soon after.

Concerned about the fate of Campion as the sole surviving human, Father attempts to communicate with the Mithraic, whose spacecraft (an ark dubbed Heaven) has arrived at Kepler-22b and is orbiting the planet. Outraged to learn of this, a malfunctioning Mother attacks and disables Father and hides his body. Campion succeeds in contacting the ark and a small Mithraic reconnaissance team discovers their plantation. Considering Campion to be a possible prophet, the Mithraics decide to abduct him and destroy Mother. However, their plan backfires, and Mother kills several members of the team. One of the team, Marcus, (Travis Fimmel) attempts to escape in the reconnaissance ship but is stopped by Mother and thrown out. Mother hijacks the ship and boards the ark. The Mithraics attempt to repel her but she disintegrates her attackers with sonic screams. After setting the ark on a crash course with the planet, Mother returns to the farm with a number of children from the ark. Marcus is shown to have survived Mother's assault, and Campion begins to have reservations about Mother.

== Production ==
"Raised by Wolves" was directed by Ridley Scott, who also directed the show's second episode, "Pentagram". The screenplay was written by Aaron Guzikowski. Filming took place in South Africa.

== Release ==
"Raised by Wolves" premiered on September 3, 2020 on the subscription video on demand streaming service HBO Max.

== Reception ==
Daniel Fienberg of The Hollywood Reporter said that the episode was a "promising start" to the series, adding that it was "an intriguingly enigmatic crossroads". Writing for Forbes, Erik Kain called the episode "terrific" and praised Collin and Salim's performances. He added that it "defied my expectations at every turn". Arielle Bernstein of The A.V. Club described the episode as "foreboding" and "thrilling". She gave it an A−. Mike Hale of The New York Times found the episode "highly watchable". On the other hand, Caroline Framke of Variety wrote: "From its very first minutes, watching Raised By Wolves feels like watching writer Aaron Guzikowski play a game of hard sci-fi bingo."
