= Chicago Film Critics Association Award for Best Cinematography =

Annual US film award

- Description: Annual film award category honoring the best achievements in cinematography
- Country: United States
- Presented by: Chicago Film Critics Association

The Chicago Film Critics Association Award for Best Cinematography is one of several categories presented by the Chicago Film Critics Association (CFCA), an association of professional film critics, who work in print, broadcast and online media, based in Chicago. Since the 3rd Chicago Film Critics Association Awards (1990), the award is presented annually. Nominations from 1991 to 1994 are not available. The first Chicago Film Critics Association Award for Best Cinematography went to Dean Semler for his work on Dances with Wolves. The most recent recipient of this award is Michael Bauman for One Battle After Another.

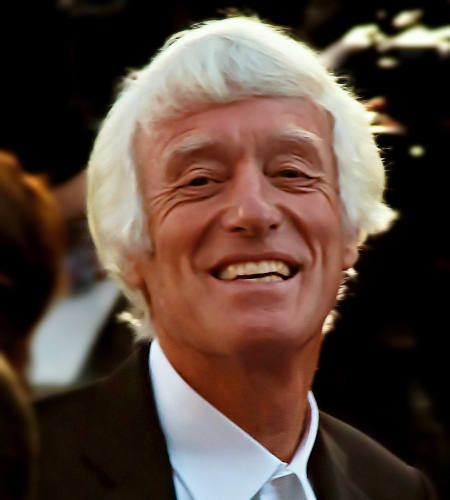
Roger Deakins has received the highest number of nominations (13), resulting in four wins.

== Statistical milestones ==
Roger Deakins is the cinematographer with the most nominations (13); those have resulted in the most wins (4). Emmanuel Lubezki also has four wins, but from eight nominations. Robert Richardson has eight nominations, which have resulted in two wins. Other notable achievers include Janusz Kamiński (9 nominations, 1 win), Michael Ballhaus (4 nominations, 1 win) and Rodrigo Prieto (4 nominations, 1 win). Seven cinematographers have been nominated multiple times, but never received the award. These include Conrad Hall, Robert Elswit, Claudio Miranda, and Łukasz Żal; Mandy Walker was the first female cinematographer to have received a nomination for the award.

== Notable ceremonies ==
The 16th Chicago Film Critics Association Awards (2003) saw all 15 cinematographers who worked on Winged Migration nominated for Best Cinematography, while the 17th Chicago Film Critics Association Awards (2004) was the first to result in a tie. In 2007, Deakins received two nominations for his work on The Assassination of Jesse James and No Country for Old Men, the first time a cinematographer has been nominated twice in one year.

== Winner and nominees ==
=== 1990s ===
Year	Cinematographer	Film	Ref.
1990	Dean Semler	Dances with Wolves	
1990	Gordon Willis	The Godfather Part III	
1990	Michael Ballhaus	Goodfellas	
1991	Roger Deakins	Barton Fink	
1992	Michael Ballhaus	Bram Stoker's Dracula	
1993	Janusz Kamiński	Schindler's List	
1994	Stefan Czapsky	Ed Wood	
1995	Darius Khondji	Se7en	
1995	Dean Cundey	Apollo 13	
1995	Matthew F. Leonetti	Strange Days	
1995	Emmanuel Lubezki	A Walk in the Clouds	
1995	Dante Spinotti	Heat	
1995	Haskell Wexler	The Secret of Roan Inish	
1996	John Seale	The English Patient	
1996	Roger Deakins	Fargo	
1996	Darius Khondji	Evita	
1996	Chris Menges	Michael Collins	
1996	Robby Müller	Dead Man	
1997	Russell Carpenter	Titanic	
1997	Roger Deakins	Kundun	
1997	Frederick Elmes	The Ice Storm	
1997	Dante Spinotti	L.A. Confidential	
1997	Sacha Vierny	The Pillow Book	
1998	John Toll	The Thin Red Line	
1998	Remi Adefarasin	Elizabeth	
1998	Tak Fujimoto	Beloved	
1998	Janusz Kamiński	Saving Private Ryan	
1998	Robert Richardson	The Horse Whisperer	
1999	Robert Richardson	Snow Falling on Cedars	
1999	Conrad Hall	American Beauty	
1999	Stanley Kubrick and Larry Smith	Eyes Wide Shut	
1999	Emmanuel Lubezki	Sleepy Hollow	
1999	John Seale	The Talented Mr. Ripley	

=== 2000s ===
Year	Cinematographer	Film	Ref.
2000	Peter Pau	Crouching Tiger, Hidden Dragon	
2000	Peter Andrews	Traffic	
2000	Don Burgess	Cast Away	
2000	Roger Deakins	O Brother, Where Art Thou?	
2000	John Mathieson	Gladiator	
2001	Andrew Lesnie	The Lord of the Rings: The Fellowship of the Ring	
2001	Roger Deakins	The Man Who Wasn't There	
2001	Peter Deming	Mulholland Drive	
2001	Christopher Doyle and Mark Lee Ping Bin	In the Mood for Love	
2001	Janusz Kamiński	A.I. Artificial Intelligence	
2001	Donald McAlpine	Moulin Rouge!	
2002	Edward Lachman	Far from Heaven	
2002	Michael Ballhaus	Gangs of New York	
2002	Conrad Hall	Road to Perdition	
2002	Janusz Kamiński	Minority Report	
2002	Andrew Lesnie	The Lord of the Rings: The Two Towers	
2003	Lance Acord	Lost in Translation	
2003	Olli Barbé, et al.	Winged Migration	
2003	Russell Boyd	Master and Commander: The Far Side of the World	
2003	Andrew Lesnie	The Lord of the Rings: The Return of the King	
2003	John Seale	Cold Mountain	
2003	Eduardo Serra	Girl with a Pearl Earring	
2004	Christopher Doyle (TIE)	Hero	
2004	Robert Richardson (TIE)	The Aviator	
2005	Rodrigo Prieto	Brokeback Mountain	
2005	Robert Elswit	Good Night, and Good Luck	
2005	Janusz Kamiński	Munich	
2005	Andrew Lesnie	King Kong	
2005	Emmanuel Lubezki	The New World	
2005	Roman Osin	Pride & Prejudice	
2006	Emmanuel Lubezki	Children of Men	
2006	Michael Ballhaus	The Departed	
2006	Matthew Libatique	The Fountain	
2006	Rodrigo Prieto	Babel	
2006	Tom Stern	Letters from Iwo Jima	
2007	Roger Deakins	The Assassination of Jesse James	
2007	Roger Deakins	No Country for Old Men	
2007	Robert Elswit	There Will Be Blood	
2007	Janusz Kamiński	The Diving Bell and the Butterfly	
2007	Seamus McGarvey	Atonement	
2008	Wally Pfister	The Dark Knight	
2008	Anthony Dod Mantle	Slumdog Millionaire	
2008	Claudio Miranda	The Curious Case of Benjamin Button	
2008	Mandy Walker	Australia	
2008	Colin Watkinson	The Fall	
2009	Barry Ackroyd	The Hurt Locker	
2009	Lance Acord	Where the Wild Things Are	
2009	Mauro Fiore	Avatar	
2009	Greig Fraser	Bright Star	
2009	Robert Richardson	Inglourious Basterds	

=== 2010s ===
Year	Cinematographer	Film	Ref.
2010	Wally Pfister	Inception	
2010	Jeff Cronenweth	The Social Network	
2010	Roger Deakins	True Grit	
2010	Matthew Libatique	Black Swan	
2010	Robert Richardson	Shutter Island	
2011	Emmanuel Lubezki	The Tree of Life	
2011	Manuel Alberto Claro	Melancholia	
2011	Janusz Kamiński	War Horse	
2011	Robert Richardson	Hugo	
2011	Newton Thomas Sigel	Drive	
2012	Mihai Mălaimare Jr.	The Master	
2012	Roger Deakins	Skyfall	
2012	Greig Fraser	Zero Dark Thirty	
2012	Janusz Kamiński	Lincoln	
2012	Claudio Miranda	Life of Pi	
2013	Emmanuel Lubezki	Gravity	
2013	Sean Bobbitt	12 Years a Slave	
2013	Roger Deakins	Prisoners	
2013	Bruno Delbonnel	Inside Llewyn Davis	
2013	Hoyte van Hoytema	Her	
2014	Emmanuel Lubezki (TIE)	Birdman	
2014	Robert Yeoman (TIE)	The Grand Budapest Hotel	
2014	Robert Elswit	Inherent Vice	
2014	Ryszard Lenczewski and Łukasz Żal	Ida	
2014	Hoyte van Hoytema	Interstellar	
2015	John Seale	Mad Max: Fury Road	
2015	Roger Deakins	Sicario	
2015	Edward Lachman	Carol	
2015	Emmanuel Lubezki	The Revenant	
2015	Robert Richardson	The Hateful Eight	
2016	Linus Sandgren	La La Land	
2016	Chung Chung-hoon	The Handmaiden	
2016	Stéphane Fontaine	Jackie	
2016	James Laxton	Moonlight	
2016	Rodrigo Prieto	Silence	
2017	Roger Deakins	Blade Runner 2049	
2017	Dan Laustsen	The Shape of Water	
2017	Rachel Morrison	Mudbound	
2017	Hoyte van Hoytema	Dunkirk	
2017	Alexis Zabé	The Florida Project	
2018	Alfonso Cuarón	Roma	
2018	James Laxton	If Beale Street Could Talk	
2018	Robbie Ryan	The Favourite	
2018	Linus Sandgren	First Man	
2018	Łukasz Żal	Cold War	
2019	Roger Deakins	1917	
2019	Jarin Blaschke	The Lighthouse	
2019	Hong Kyung-pyo	Parasite	
2019	Claire Mathon	Portrait of a Lady on Fire	
2019	Robert Richardson	Once Upon a Time in Hollywood	

=== 2020s ===
Year	Cinematographer	Film	Ref.
2020	Joshua James Richards	Nomadland	
2020	Christopher Blauvelt	First Cow	
2020	Shabier Kirchner	Lovers Rock	
2020	Erik Messerschmidt	Mank	
2020	M. I. Littin-Menz	The Vast of Night	
2021	Ari Wegner	The Power of the Dog	
2021	Greig Fraser	Dune	
2021	Andrew Droz Palermo	The Green Knight	
2021	Bruno Delbonnel	The Tragedy of Macbeth	
2021	Janusz Kaminski	West Side Story	
2022	Kim Ji-yong	Decision to Leave	
2022	Linus Sandgren	Babylon	
2022	Darius Khondji	Bardo, False Chronicle of a Handful of Truths	
2022	Larkin Seiple	Everything Everywhere All at Once	
2022	Claudio Miranda	Top Gun: Maverick	
2023	Hoyte van Hoytema	Oppenheimer	
2023	Robert D. Yeoman	Asteroid City	
2023	Rodrigo Prieto	Killers of the Flower Moon	
2023	Robbie Ryan	Poor Things	
2023	Łukasz Żal	The Zone of Interest	
2024	Jomo Fray	Nickel Boys	
2024	Lol Crawley	The Brutalist	
2024	Sayombhu Mukdeeprom	Challengers	
2024	Greig Fraser	Dune: Part Two	
2024	Jarin Blaschke	Nosferatu	
2025	Michael Bauman	One Battle After Another	
2025	Dan Laustsen	Frankenstein	
2025	Łukasz Żal	Hamnet	
2025	Autumn Durald Arkapaw	Sinners	
2025	Adolpho Veloso	Train Dreams	
