= Claudio Miranda =

Chilean-born American cinematographer (born 1965)

- Born: March 13, 1965 (age 61); Valparaíso, Valparaíso Region, Chile
- Years active: 1988–present
- Spouse: Kelli Bean (m. 2009)
- Children: Sofia Isella
- Website: www.claudiomiranda.com

Claudio Miranda, ASC (Spanish pronunciation: [ˈklawðjo miˈɾanda]; March 13, 1965) is a Chilean-American cinematographer, known for his collaboration with director Joseph Kosinski.

For his work on David Fincher's The Curious Case of Benjamin Button (2008), the movie became the first film shot entirely digitally to be nominated for the Academy Award for Best Cinematography.

In winning Best Cinematography for the Ang Lee-directed film Life of Pi (2012), he became the second Chilean-born person to win an Academy Award.

== Early life ==
Miranda was born in Valparaíso to a Chilean father and a Danish mother. His family emigrated to the United States when he was a year old, and he was raised in Southern California.

== Career ==
Miranda's entered the film industry in the lighting department. He was a gaffer and lighting technician under Dariusz Wolski for The Crow, Crimson Tide, and The Fan. During the 2000s he shot numerous commercials and music videos, winning two Bronze Clio Awards.

He started working with David Fincher as a gaffer on Seven, The Game and Fight Club, before working in additional photography on Zodiac. He carried on Fincher's previous use of the Thomson Viper FilmStream Camera on Zodiac when filming The Curious Case of Benjamin Button. The latter earned him his first Oscar nomination. He then won an Oscar in 2012, as well as a BAFTA Award, for his work on Ang Lee's Life of Pi.

He has been a member of the American Society of Cinematographers since 2009.

Miranda has cited late cinematographer Harris Savides as an artistic influence.

== Personal life ==
Miranda has been married to Kelli Bean since 2009. They are the parents of singer Sofia Isella (b. 2005).

== Filmography ==
Key
†	Denotes projects that have not yet been released

=== Feature film ===
Year	Title	Director	Notes
2006	Failure to Launch	Tom Dey	
2008	The Curious Case of Benjamin Button	David Fincher	
2010	Tron: Legacy	Joseph Kosinski	
2012	Life of Pi	Ang Lee	
2013	Oblivion	Joseph Kosinski	
2015	Tomorrowland	Brad Bird	
2017	Only the Brave	Joseph Kosinski	
2022	Top Gun: Maverick	Joseph Kosinski	
2022	Spiderhead	Joseph Kosinski	
2023	Nyad	Elizabeth Chai Vasarhelyi; Jimmy Chin	
2025	F1	Joseph Kosinski	
2027	Star Wars: Starfighter †	Shawn Levy	Post-production
2028	Miami Vice '85 †	Joseph Kosinski	Filming

=== Short film ===
Year	Title	Director	Notes
2115	100 Years †	Robert Rodriguez	Completed in 2015

=== Music videos ===
Year	Title	Director	Artist(s)	Notes
2000	"Thong Song"	Director X	Sisqo featuring Foxy Brown	
2000	"Let's Get Married"	Bryan Barber	Jagged Edge featuring Reverend Run	
2000	"The Best of Me" (Part Two)	Hype Williams	Mýa featuring Jay-Z	
2000	"It's a Fact"	Director X	Sparkle	
2001	"Lay Low"	Hype Williams	Snoop Dogg Feat. Master P, Nate Dogg, Butch Cassidy and Tha Eastsidaz	
2001	"B.K. Anthem"	Director X	Foxy Brown	
2001	"More than That"	Marcus Raboy	Backstreet Boys	
2001	"You Rock My World"	Paul Hunter	Michael Jackson	
2003	"Baby Boy"	Jake Nava	Beyoncé	
2005	"Everyday (Rudebwoy)"	R. T. Thorne	Kardinal Offishall	
2006	"Red Flag"	Floria Sigismondi	Billy Talent	
2018	"Girls Like You"	David Dobkin	Maroon 5 featuring Cardi B	Original, Volume 2 and Vertical Video versions

== Awards and nominations ==
=== Major awards ===
Year	Award	Category	Title	Result	Ref.
2008	Academy Awards	Best Cinematography	The Curious Case of Benjamin Button	Nominated	
2012	Academy Awards	Best Cinematography	Life of Pi	Won	
2008	BAFTA Awards	Best Cinematography	The Curious Case of Benjamin Button	Nominated	
2012	BAFTA Awards	Best Cinematography	Life of Pi	Won	
2022	BAFTA Awards	Best Cinematography	Top Gun: Maverick	Nominated	
2008	American Society of Cinematographers	Outstanding Achievement in Cinematography	The Curious Case of Benjamin Button	Nominated	
2012	American Society of Cinematographers	Outstanding Achievement in Cinematography	Life of Pi	Nominated	

=== Other accolades ===
Year	Title	Award/Nomination
2008	The Curious Case of Benjamin Button	Houston Film Critics Society Award for Best Cinematography; Phoenix Film Critics Society for Best Cinematography; Nominated–Chicago Film Critics Association Award for Best Cinematography; Nominated–Dallas–Fort Worth Film Critics Association Award for Best Cinematography; Nominated–Satellite Award for Best Cinematography
2012	Life of Pi	Alliance of Women Film Journalists Award for Best Cinematography; Critics' Choice Movie Award for Best Cinematography; Dallas–Fort Worth Film Critics Association Award for Best Cinematography; Las Vegas Film Critics Society Award for Best Cinematography; New York Film Critics Circle Award for Best Cinematographer; North Texas Film Critics Association Award for Best Cinematography; Phoenix Film Critics Society Award for Best Cinematography; San Diego Film Critics Society Award for Best Cinematography; San Francisco Film Critics Circle Award for Best Cinematography; Satellite Award for Best Cinematography; Southeastern Film Critics Association Award for Best Cinematography; Washington D.C. Area Film Critics Association Award for Best Cinematography; Nominated–Chicago Film Critics Association Award for Best Cinematography; Nominated–Houston Film Critics Society Award for Best Cinematography; Nominated–Online Film Critics Society Award for Best Cinematography; Nominated–St. Louis Gateway Film Critics Association Award for Best Cinematography
2022	Top Gun: Maverick	Atlanta Film Critic Circle Award for Best Cinematography; Black Film Critics Circle Award for Best Cinematography; Boston Online Film Critics Association Award for Best Cinematography; Dublin Film Critics Circle Award for Best Cinematography; Las Vegas Film Critics Society Award for Best Cinematography; North Texas Film Critics Association Award for Best Cinematography; New York Film Critics Circle Award for Best Cinematography; Phoenix Critics Circle Award for Best Cinematography; Southern Eastern Film Critics Association Award for Best Cinematography; Utah Film Critics Association Award for Best Cinematography; Washington Film Critics Association Award for Best Cinematography; Critics' Choice Movie Award for Best Cinematography
