= Matthew Libatique =

American cinematographer (born 1968)

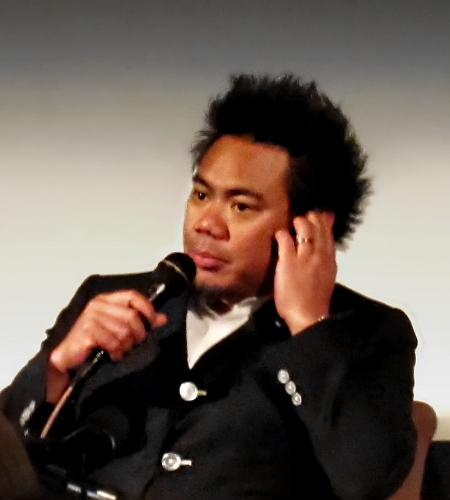
- Libatique in 2011
- Born: Matthew José Libatique; July 19, 1968 (age 58); New York City, New York, U.S.
- Other name: Matty Libatique
- Education: California State University, Fullerton; AFI Conservatory
- Occupation: Cinematographer
- Years active: 1993–present
- Spouse: Mary-Ellen Libatique
- Awards: See below

Matthew José Libatique ASC, LPS (born July 19, 1968) is an American cinematographer. He is best known for his collaborations with directors Darren Aronofsky, Joel Schumacher, Spike Lee, and Bradley Cooper. He has received three Academy Award nominations for Best Cinematography - for Black Swan (2010), A Star Is Born (2018), and Maestro (2023). He is also a two-time Independent Spirit Award winner, and two-time BAFTA Award nominee.

== Early life and education ==
Matthew Libatique was born in Elmhurst, Queens, New York City, to Filipino immigrant parents Georgina (née José) and Justiniáno Libatique. His father was from Dagupan, and his mother was from Lucena.

Libatique studied sociology and communications at California State University, Fullerton, before earning an MFA in cinematography at AFI Conservatory. In 2024, Labatique was awarded the 31st Annual Franklin J. Schaffner Alumni Medal.

== Career ==
Libatique served as director of photography for music videos and teamed with fellow AFI alumnus Aronofsky for the short film Protozoa. The two collaborated on the first three of Aronofsky's feature films. Other frequent collaborators are Julie Dash (music videos including Tracy Chapman's "Give Me One Reason"), Spike Lee (She Hate Me, Inside Man and Miracle at St. Anna), Joel Schumacher (Tigerland, Phone Booth and The Number 23), Jon Favreau (Iron Man, Iron Man 2 and Cowboys & Aliens), and Bradley Cooper (A Star Is Born, Maestro, and Is This Thing On?).

Libatique's notable films include blockbusters such as Iron Man and Iron Man 2. In 2010, he was nominated for an Academy Award for Best Cinematography for his work on Black Swan, for which he won his second Independent Spirit award. He has also won best cinematography awards at the LA Film Critics Association, NY Film Critics Online, SF Film Critics, among many others.

Libatique discussed the importance of working closely with a director on a Cinematographer Roundtable with The Hollywood Reporter, revealing: “The main thing is that you (both cinematographer and director) have the same goal and are telling the same story. Going into preparation you really need to be on the same page. Conflicts may arise when there’s a miscommunication about what’s important in a scene. So, it’s really important to listen...The director can (understandably) get pulled in a lot of different directions in prep. We, cinematographers are sort of guarding the gate of filmmaking, amongst all the other things that are happening.”

He has also said of his process: “I’d like to think each film is custom made. The director obviously dictates the approach that I have because everybody has a different working style. Some people want to talk intensely and visually about shots. Some don’t talk much at all. They concentrate more on the performances and they give you a broad idea of what they want the film to look like. So my first approach is to evaluate them, which may start in the interview process. But you also learn in preparation, as much as you can about the director. And that informs how I prepare in pre-production. If I’m lucky I can shape a visual language off some kind of inspiration. But the director definitely dictates how I do it.”

== Personal life ==
Libatique married film professional and former attorney Mary-Ellen Libatique (née Vales) in 2021 in Malibu, CA.

== Filmography ==
=== Film ===
Key
†	Denotes films that have not yet been released

Year	Title	Director	Notes
1998	Pi	Darren Aronofsky	First of eight collaborations with Aronofsky
2000	Requiem for a Dream	Darren Aronofsky	
2000	Tigerland	Joel Schumacher	First of three collaborations with Schumacher
2001	Josie and the Pussycats	Harry Elfont; Deborah Kaplan	
2002	Abandon	Stephen Gaghan	
2002	Phone Booth	Joel Schumacher	
2003	Gothika	Mathieu Kassovitz	
2004	She Hate Me	Spike Lee	First of five collaborations with Lee
2004	Never Die Alone	Ernest Dickerson	
2005	Everything Is Illuminated	Liev Schreiber	
2006	Inside Man	Spike Lee	
2006	The Fountain	Darren Aronofsky	
2007	The Number 23	Joel Schumacher	
2008	Iron Man	Jon Favreau	First of three collaborations with Favreau
2008	Miracle at St. Anna	Spike Lee	
2010	Black Swan	Darren Aronofsky	
2010	Iron Man 2	Jon Favreau	
2010	My Own Love Song	Olivier Dahan	
2011	Cowboys & Aliens	Jon Favreau	
2012	Ruby Sparks	Jonathan Dayton; Valerie Faris	
2014	Noah	Darren Aronofsky	
2015	Straight Outta Compton	F. Gary Gray	
2015	Chi-Raq	Spike Lee	
2016	Money Monster	Jodie Foster	
2016	Pelé: Birth of a Legend	Jeff Zimbalist; Michael Zimbalist	
2017	The Circle	James Ponsoldt	
2017	Mother!	Darren Aronofsky	
2018	Venom	Ruben Fleischer	
2018	A Star Is Born	Bradley Cooper	First of three collaborations with Cooper
2019	Native Son	Rashid Johnson	
2020	Birds of Prey	Cathy Yan	
2020	The Prom	Ryan Murphy	
2022	Don't Worry Darling	Olivia Wilde	
2022	The Whale	Darren Aronofsky	
2023	Maestro	Bradley Cooper	
2025	Highest 2 Lowest	Spike Lee	
2025	Caught Stealing	Darren Aronofsky	
2025	Is This Thing On?	Bradley Cooper	

=== Music videos ===
Year	Title	Artist	Director
1996	"Give Me One Reason"	Tracy Chapman	Julie Dash
1996	"More Than One Way Home"	Keb' Mo'	Julie Dash
1997	"In My Bed"	Dru Hill	Darren Grant
1997	"Otherside of the Game"	Erykah Badu	Erykah Badu
1997	"Rapper's Delight"	Def Squad	Steve Carr
1997	"Luv 2 Luv U"	Timbaland & Magoo	Darren Grant
1997	"Anytime"	Brian McKnight	Darren Grant
1997	"All a Dream"	Big Mike	Daniel Zirilli
1998	"Was It Something I Didn't Say"	98 Degrees	Darren Grant
1998	"Clock Strikes"	Timbaland & Magoo	Steve Carr
1998	"No Worries"	Hepcat	Piper Ferguson
1998	"Second Round K.O."	Canibus	Chris Robinson
1998	"Westside"	TQ	Darren Grant
1998	"The City Is Mine"	Jay-Z	Steve Carr & Jay-Z
1998	"What U See Is What U Get"	Xzibit	Gregory Dark
1999	"Can I Get A..."	Jay-Z	Steve Carr
1999	"My Favorite Girl"	Dave Hollister	Steve Carr
1999	"Just My Imagination"	The Cranberries	Phil Harder
1999	"Aisha"	Death in Vegas	Terry Richardson
1999	"Bodyrock"	Moby	Steve Carr
1999	"Get in Line"	Barenaked Ladies	Phil Harder
1999	"Ooh La La"	The Wiseguys	Scott Bibo
1999	"Lobster & Shrimp"	Timbaland featuring Jay-Z	Steve Carr
1999	"Apollo Kids"	Ghostface Killah	Chris Robinson & Ghostface Killah
2000	"Anything"	Jay-Z	Chris Robinson
2000	"Dance Tonight"	Lucy Pearl	Darren Grant
2000	"Got Beef"	Tha Eastsidaz	Chris Robinson
2000	"Boyz-n-the-Hood"	Dynamite Hack	Evan Bernard
2000	"Whatever"	Ideal	Darren Grant
2000	"Stellar"	Incubus	Phil Harder
2000	"New America"	Bad Religion	Evan Bernard
2001	"Fool"	Mansun	Phil Harder
2001	"Mad Season"	Matchbox 20	Phil Harder
2001	"The Trees"	Pulp	Phil Harder
2001	"Save Me"	Remy Zero	Phil Harder
2001	"Goodbye"	Jagged Edge	Forest Whitaker
2001	"Hate in Yo Eyes"	Mack 10	Bille Woodruff
2002	"Cold"	Static-X	Nathan Cox & Joe Hahn
2002	"Symphony in X Major"	Xzibit	Joe Hahn
2002	"Pitiful"	Blindside	Nathan Cox
2002	"Dem Girlz"	Oxide & Neutrino	Nathan Cox
2003	"The Golden Path"	The Chemical Brothers featuring The Flaming Lips	Chris Milk
2004	"alt.end"	The Cure	The Saline Project
2004	"Taking Off"	The Cure	The Saline Project
2008	"The Lake"	Muscles	Jaron Albertin
2011	"The View"	Lou Reed and Metallica	Darren Aronofsky
2013	"Suit & Tie"	Justin Timberlake featuring Jay-Z	David Fincher
2013	"Mirrors"	Justin Timberlake	Floria Sigismondi
2016	"Needed Me"	Rihanna	Harmony Korine
2021	"I Bet You Think About Me"	Taylor Swift	Blake Lively

== Awards and nominations ==
Award	Wins	Nominations
Academy Awards	N/A	3
BAFTA Film Awards	N/A	2
ASC Awards	N/A	3
Independent Spirit Awards	2	3

=== Academy Awards ===
Year	Title	Category	Result
2010	Black Swan	Best Cinematography	Nominated
2018	A Star Is Born	Best Cinematography	Nominated
2023	Maestro	Best Cinematography	Nominated

=== British Academy Film Awards ===
Year	Title	Category	Result
2010	Black Swan	Best Cinematography	Nominated
2023	Maestro	Best Cinematography	Nominated

=== American Society of Cinematographers Awards ===
Year	Title	Category	Result
2010	Black Swan	Outstanding Achievement in Cinematography	Nominated
2018	A Star Is Born	Outstanding Achievement in Cinematography	Nominated
2023	Maestro	Outstanding Achievement in Cinematography	Nominated

=== Independent Spirit Awards ===
Year	Title	Category	Result
1998	Pi	Best Cinematography	Nominated
2000	Requiem for a Dream	Best Cinematography	Won
2010	Black Swan	Best Cinematography	Won

=== Online Film Critics Society ===
Year	Title	Category	Result
2000	Requiem for a Dream	Best Cinematography	Nominated
2006	The Fountain	Best Cinematography	Nominated
2010	Black Swan	Best Cinematography	Nominated

=== Boston Society of Film Critics ===
Year	Title	Category	Result
2000	Requiem for a Dream	Best Cinematography	Nominated
2010	Black Swan	Best Cinematography	Nominated

=== Chicago Film Critics Association ===
Year	Title	Category	Result
2006	The Fountain	Best Cinematography	Nominated
2010	Black Swan	Best Cinematography	Nominated

=== Satellite Awards ===
Year	Title	Category	Result
2006	The Fountain	Best Cinematography	Nominated
2018	A Star Is Born	Best Cinematography	Won
2023	Maestro	Best Cinematography	Won

=== Critics' Choice Movie Awards ===
Year	Title	Category	Result
2010	Black Swan	Best Cinematography	Nominated
2018	A Star Is Born	Best Cinematography	Nominated
2023	Maestro	Best Cinematography	Nominated

=== Washington D.C. Area Film Critics Association ===
Year	Title	Category	Result
2010	Black Swan	Best Cinematography	Nominated
2018	A Star Is Born	Best Cinematography	Nominated
2023	Maestro	Best Cinematography	Nominated

Other awards

Year	Title	Award/Nomination
2010	Black Swan	Los Angeles Film Critics Association Award for Best Cinematography; Nominated– Houston Film Critics Society Award for Best Cinematography; Nominated– National Society of Film Critics Award for Best Cinematography; Nominated– New York Film Critics Circle Award for Best Cinematography; Nominated– San Diego Film Critics Society Award for Best Cinematography; Nominated– San Francisco Bay Area Film Critics Circle Award for Best Cinematography
2018	A Star Is Born	Nominated– St. Louis Gateway Film Critics Association Award for Best Cinematography
