= Robert Richardson (cinematographer) =

American cinematographer

Robert Richardson ASC
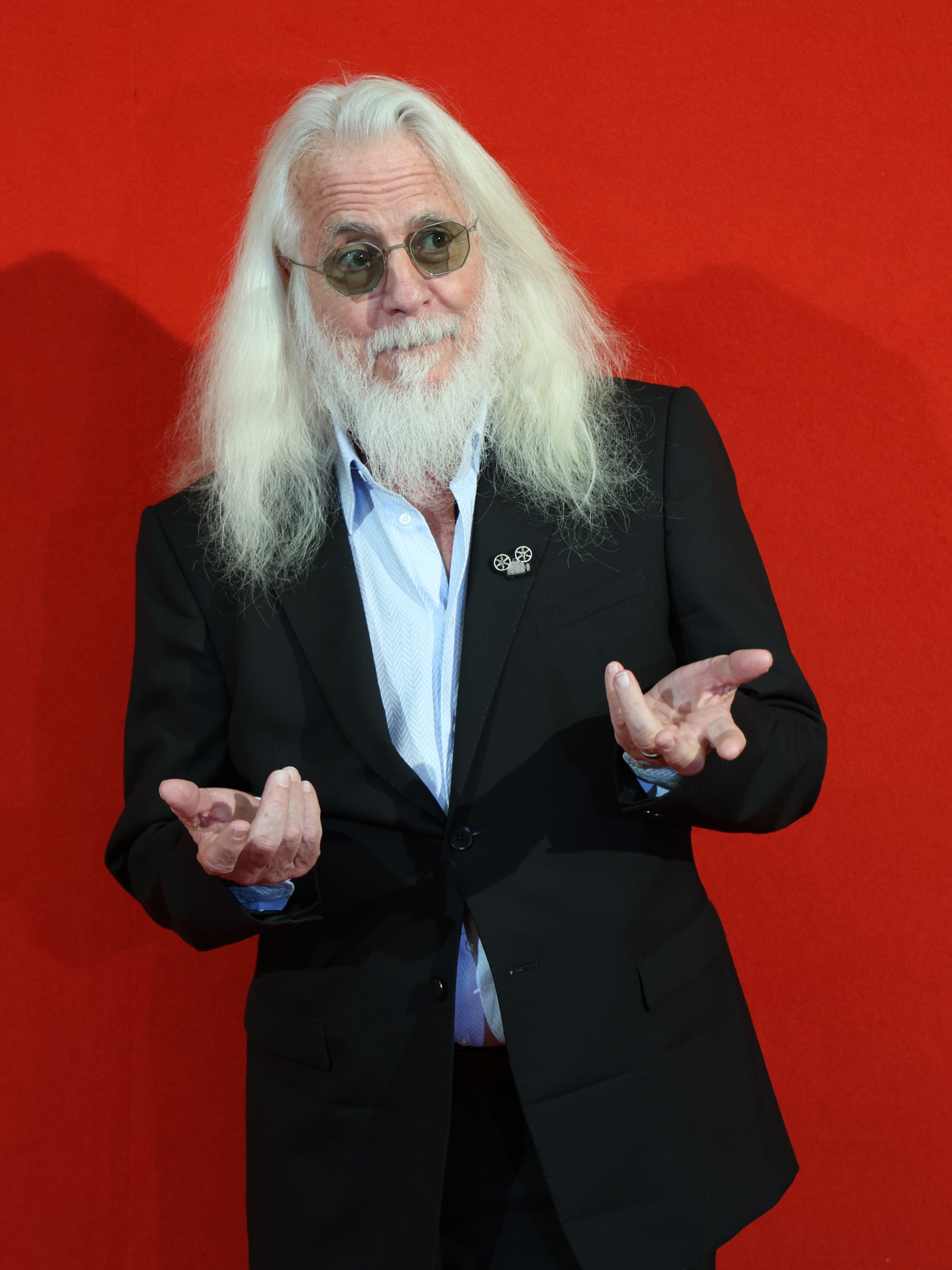
- Richardson in 2026
- Born: Robert Bridge Richardson; August 27, 1955 (age 71); Hyannis, Massachusetts, U.S.
- Education: AFI Conservatory
- Alma mater: AFI and RISD
- Years active: 1981–present

Robert Bridge Richardson, ASC (born August 27, 1955) is an American cinematographer.

Known for his work with Oliver Stone, Martin Scorsese, and Quentin Tarantino, he explores a variety of visual styles, both with film and digital cameras.

He is one of three living people who has won the Academy Award for Best Cinematography three times, along with Vittorio Storaro and Emmanuel Lubezki.

== Early life and education ==
Richardson graduated from the Rhode Island School of Design with a BFA in Film/Animation/Video and received his MFA from AFI Conservatory. He received a Lifetime Achievement Award from The American Society of Cinematographers.

== Career ==
Richardson's work began as a camera operator and 2nd unit photographer on such features as Alex Cox's Repo Man, Dorian Walker's Making the Grade and Wes Craven's A Nightmare on Elm Street (all in 1984). At the same time he also served as cinematographer on TV documentaries and docudramas such as America, America for The Disney Channel, God's Peace for the BBC and PBS' The Front Line: El Salvador. His television work and documentary-style filmmaking led to his meeting Oliver Stone, who hired him to "shoot" Salvador (1986).

Oliver Stone's major motion picture debut was also Richardson's first film as director of photography. Salvador was also filmed in the same year as Stone's Platoon. Platoon would earn Richardson his first Oscar nomination for Best Cinematography. In 1987, Richardson reteamed with Stone on Wall Street. In 1988, he filmed Eight Men Out for John Sayles. In 1989, he earned his second Best Cinematography Oscar nomination for Stone's Born on the Fourth of July.

In 1991, Richardson won the first of his Best Cinematography Academy Awards for his work on Stone's JFK; he also shot Stone's The Doors that same year. He worked with Sayles again in 1991 for City of Hope. In 1992, he worked as director of photography on Rob Reiner's A Few Good Men. He served as a 2nd unit photographer for Haskell Wexler on To the Moon, Alice, a "Showtime 30-Minute Movie" (for which he was also credited as a visual consultant). He began a long working relationship with Martin Scorsese in 1995, with Casino. Also in 1995, he was the cinematographer on Stone's Nixon. In 1997, Richardson photographed Errol Morris's documentary Fast, Cheap and Out of Control as well as filming the majority of Stone's U Turn and serving as director of photography for Barry Levinson's Wag the Dog.

Richardson worked on the 2013 zombie film World War Z, but asked for his name to be taken off the final product. The credited cinematographer is Ben Seresin.

In 2026, a feature documentary portrait of his career titled Robert Richardson: The White Devil was selected to screen at the 60th Karlovy Vary International Film Festival where Richardson was also honoured with the Crystal Globe For Outstanding Artistic Contribution.

== Filmography ==
=== Film ===
Year	Title	Director	Notes
1986	Salvador	Oliver Stone	1st collaboration with Stone
1986	Platoon	Oliver Stone	
1987	Dudes	Penelope Spheeris	
1987	Wall Street	Oliver Stone	
1988	Eight Men Out	John Sayles	
1988	Talk Radio	Oliver Stone	
1989	Born on the Fourth of July	Oliver Stone	
1991	City of Hope	John Sayles	
1991	The Doors	Oliver Stone	
1991	JFK	Oliver Stone	
1992	A Few Good Men	Rob Reiner	
1993	Heaven & Earth	Oliver Stone	
1994	Natural Born Killers	Oliver Stone	
1995	Casino	Martin Scorsese	1st collaboration with Scorsese
1995	Nixon	Oliver Stone	
1997	U Turn	Oliver Stone	
1997	Wag the Dog	Barry Levinson	Also made a cameo as "Man in TV Studio" (Uncredited)
1998	The Horse Whisperer	Robert Redford	
1999	Snow Falling on Cedars	Scott Hicks	
1999	Bringing Out the Dead	Martin Scorsese	
2002	The Four Feathers	Shekhar Kapur	
2003	Kill Bill: Volume 1	Quentin Tarantino	1st collaboration with Tarantino; Shot Back-to-back
2004	Kill Bill: Volume 2	Quentin Tarantino	1st collaboration with Tarantino; Shot Back-to-back
2004	Kill Bill: The Whole Bloody Affair	Quentin Tarantino	1st collaboration with Tarantino; Shot Back-to-back
2004	The Aviator	Martin Scorsese	
2006	The Good Shepherd	Robert De Niro	
2009	Inglourious Basterds	Quentin Tarantino	
2010	Shutter Island	Martin Scorsese	
2010	Eat Pray Love	Ryan Murphy	
2011	Hugo	Martin Scorsese	
2012	Django Unchained	Quentin Tarantino	
2013	World War Z	Marc Forster	Uncredited
2015	The Hateful Eight	Quentin Tarantino	
2016	Live by Night	Ben Affleck	
2017	Breathe	Andy Serkis	
2018	Adrift	Baltasar Kormákur	
2018	A Private War	Matthew Heineman	
2019	Once Upon a Time... in Hollywood	Quentin Tarantino	
2021	Venom: Let There Be Carnage	Andy Serkis	
2022	Emancipation	Antoine Fuqua	1st collaboration with Fuqua
2023	Air	Ben Affleck	
2023	The Equalizer 3	Antoine Fuqua	
2026	Madden	David O. Russell	
2027	4 Kids Walk Into a Bank †	Frankie Shaw	Post-production

=== Documentary ===
Film

Year	Title	Director	Notes
1984	The Front Line	Jeff B. Harmon; Christopher Wenner	With Jacques Audrain
1997	Fast, Cheap & Out of Control	Errol Morris	
1999	Mr. Death: The Rise and Fall of Fred A. Leuchter, Jr.	Errol Morris	
2008	Shine a Light	Martin Scorsese	Concert film
2008	Standard Operating Procedure	Errol Morris	With Robert Chappell
2011	George Harrison: Living in the Material World	Martin Scorsese	With Martin Kenzie
2017	The Return	Erich Joiner	
2021	JFK Revisited: Through the Looking Glass	Oliver Stone	
TBA	In between Stars and Scars: Masters of Cinema	Yi Zhou	With Yi Zhou

Television

Year	Title	Director	Notes
1982	Desperate Dreams	Daniel J. Blackburn; Maria Centrella	TV movie
1985	America Undercover	Himself; Terry Dunn Meurer	Episode "Losin' It: Sex and the American Teenager"
1987	Unsolved Mysteries	John Cosgrove	Segment Missing...Have You Seen This Person?
2021	JFK: Destiny Betrayed	Oliver Stone	Miniseries

== Award and nominations ==
Academy Awards

Year	Category	Nominated work	Result	Ref.
1986	Best Cinematography	Platoon	Nominated	
1989	Best Cinematography	Born on the Fourth of July	Nominated	
1991	Best Cinematography	JFK	Won	
1999	Best Cinematography	Snow Falling on Cedars	Nominated	
2004	Best Cinematography	The Aviator	Won	
2009	Best Cinematography	Inglourious Basterds	Nominated	
2011	Best Cinematography	Hugo	Won	
2012	Best Cinematography	Django Unchained	Nominated	
2015	Best Cinematography	The Hateful Eight	Nominated	
2019	Best Cinematography	Once Upon a Time in Hollywood	Nominated	

BAFTA Awards

Year	Category	Nominated work	Result	Ref.
1986	Best Cinematography	Platoon	Nominated	
2004	Best Cinematography	The Aviator	Nominated	
2009	Best Cinematography	Inglourious Basterds	Nominated	
2011	Best Cinematography	Hugo	Nominated	

American Society of Cinematographers

Year	Category	Nominated work	Result
1989	Outstanding Achievement in Cinematography	Born on the Fourth of July	Nominated
1991	Outstanding Achievement in Cinematography	JFK	Nominated
1992	Outstanding Achievement in Cinematography	A Few Good Men	Nominated
1993	Outstanding Achievement in Cinematography	Heaven & Earth	Nominated
1998	Outstanding Achievement in Cinematography	The Horse Whisperer	Nominated
1999	Outstanding Achievement in Cinematography	Snow Falling on Cedars	Nominated
2004	Outstanding Achievement in Cinematography	The Aviator	Nominated
2006	Outstanding Achievement in Cinematography	The Good Shepherd	Nominated
2009	Outstanding Achievement in Cinematography	Inglourious Basterds	Nominated
2011	Outstanding Achievement in Cinematography	Hugo	Nominated
2019	Outstanding Achievement in Cinematography	Once Upon a Time in Hollywood	Nominated

Miscellaneous awards

Year	Award	Title	Notes
1986	Independent Spirit Award for Best Cinematography	Salvador	Nominated
1986	Independent Spirit Award for Best Cinematography	Platoon	Won
1988	Independent Spirit Award for Best Cinematography	Talk Radio	Nominated
1989	Los Angeles Film Critics Association Award for Best Cinematography	Born on the Fourth of July	Nominated
1991	Dallas–Fort Worth Film Critics Association Award for Best Cinematography	JFK	Won
1998	Chicago Film Critics Association Award for Best Cinematography	The Horse Whisperer	Nominated
1999	Chicago Film Critics Association Award for Best Cinematography	Snow Falling on Cedars	Won
1999	Dallas–Fort Worth Film Critics Association Award for Best Cinematography	Snow Falling on Cedars	Won
1999	Satellite Award for Best Cinematography	Snow Falling on Cedars	Nominated
1999	Florida Film Critics Circle Award for Best Cinematography	Snow Falling on Cedars	Won
1999	Florida Film Critics Circle Award for Best Cinematography	Bringing Out the Dead	Won
2003	Online Film Critics Society Award for Best Cinematography	Kill Bill: Volume 1	Nominated
2003	Gold Derby Awards for Best Cinematography	Kill Bill: Volume 1	Nominated
2003	Village Voice Film Poll for Best Cinematography	Kill Bill: Volume 1	Nominated
2004	Chicago Film Critics Association Award for Best Cinematography	The Aviator	Won
2004	Online Film Critics Society Award for Best Cinematography	The Aviator	Nominated
2004	Satellite Award for Best Cinematography	The Aviator	Nominated
2004	Gold Derby Awards for Best Cinematography	The Aviator	Nominated
2009	Online Film Critics Society Award for Best Cinematography	Inglourious Basterds	Won
2009	Australian Cinematographers Society for Best Cinematography	Inglourious Basterds	Won
2009	Chicago Film Critics Association Award for Best Cinematography	Inglourious Basterds	Nominated
2009	Critics' Choice Movie Award for Best Cinematography	Inglourious Basterds	Nominated
2009	Satellite Award for Best Cinematography	Inglourious Basterds	Nominated
2009	San Diego Film Critics Society Award for Best Cinematography	Inglourious Basterds	Nominated
2009	St. Louis Gateway Film Critics Association Award for Best Cinematography	Inglourious Basterds	Nominated
2009	Broadcast Film Critics Association Awards for Best Cinematography	Inglourious Basterds	Nominated
2009	Gold Derby Awards for Best Cinematography	Inglourious Basterds	Nominated
2010	Chicago Film Critics Association Award for Best Cinematography	Shutter Island	Nominated
2010	Online Film Critics Society Award for Best Cinematography	Shutter Island	Nominated
2010	Satellite Award for Best Cinematography	Shutter Island	Nominated
2010	San Diego Film Critics Society Award for Best Cinematography	Shutter Island	Nominated
2010	Awards Circuit Community Awards for Best Achievement in Cinematography	Shutter Island	Nominated
2010	Awards Circuit Community Awards for Best Cinematography	Shutter Island	Nominated
2010	International Online Cinema Awards for Best Cinematography	Shutter Island	Nominated
2010	Utah Film Critics Association Awards for Best Cinematography	Shutter Island	Nominated
2010	Online Film & Television Association for Best Cinematography	Shutter Island	Nominated
2011	Boston Society of Film Critics Award for Best Cinematography	Hugo	Nominated
2011	Chicago Film Critics Association Award for Best Cinematography	Hugo	Nominated
2011	Critics' Choice Movie Award for Best Cinematography	Hugo	Nominated
2011	Houston Film Critics Society Award for Best Cinematography	Hugo	Nominated
2011	National Society of Film Critics Award for Best Cinematography	Hugo	Nominated
2011	New York Film Critics Circle Award for Best Cinematography	Hugo	Nominated
2011	Online Film Critics Society Award for Best Cinematography	Hugo	Nominated
2011	Satellite Award for Best Cinematography	Hugo	Nominated
2011	San Diego Film Critics Society Award for Best Cinematography	Hugo	Nominated
2011	Washington D.C. Area Film Critics Association Award for Best Cinematography	Hugo	Nominated
2012	San Diego Film Critics Society Award for Best Cinematography	Django Unchained	Nominated
2012	St. Louis Gateway Film Critics Association Award for Best Cinematography	Django Unchained	Nominated
2012	Gold Derby Awards for Best Cinematography	Django Unchained	Nominated
2012	CinEuphoria Awards for Best Cinematography - International Competition	Django Unchained	Nominated
2012	Italian Online Movie Awards for Best Best Cinematography (Miglior fotografia)	Django Unchained	Nominated
2015	Chicago Film Critics Association Award for Best Cinematography	The Hateful Eight	Nominated
2015	Critics' Choice Movie Award for Best Cinematography	The Hateful Eight	Nominated
2015	Houston Film Critics Society Award for Best Cinematography	The Hateful Eight	Nominated
2015	St. Louis Gateway Film Critics Association Award for Best Cinematography	The Hateful Eight	Nominated
2015	Austin Film Critics Association for Best Cinematography	The Hateful Eight	Nominated
2015	Broadcast Film Critics Association Awards for Best Cinematography	The Hateful Eight	Nominated
2015	Gold Derby Awards for Best Cinematography	The Hateful Eight	Nominated
2019	Boston Online Film Critics Association for Best Cinematography	Once Upon a Time in Hollywood	Won
2019	Oklahoma Film Critics Circle Awards for Best Cinematography	Once Upon a Time in Hollywood	Won
2019	Washington D.C. Area Film Critics Association for Best Cinematography	Once Upon a Time in Hollywood	Nominated
2019	Hollywood Critics Association Awards for Best Cinematography	Once Upon a Time in Hollywood	Nominated
2019	Southeastern Film Critics Association Awards for Best Cinematography	Once Upon a Time in Hollywood	Nominated
2019	Critics' Choice Movie Awards for Best Cinematography	Once Upon a Time in Hollywood	Nominated
2019	St. Louis Film Critics Association for Best Cinematography	Once Upon a Time in Hollywood	Nominated
2019	Seattle Film Critics Awards for Best Cinematography	Once Upon a Time in Hollywood	Nominated
2019	Broadcast Film Critics Association Awards for Best Cinematography	Once Upon a Time in Hollywood	Nominated
2019	Online Association of Female Film Critics for Best Cinematography	Once Upon a Time in Hollywood	Nominated
2019	Boston Society of Film Critics Awards for Best Cinematography	Once Upon a Time in Hollywood	Nominated
2019	Chicago Film Critics Association Awards for Best Cinematography	Once Upon a Time in Hollywood	Nominated
2019	Phoenix Critics Circle for Best Cinematography	Once Upon a Time in Hollywood	Nominated
2019	San Francisco Film Critics Circle for Best Cinematography	Once Upon a Time in Hollywood	Nominated
2019	Alliance of Women Film Journalists for Best Cinematography	Once Upon a Time in Hollywood	Nominated
2019	Central Ohio Film Critics Association for Best Cinematography	Once Upon a Time in Hollywood	Nominated
2019	Chicago Independent Film Critics Circle Awards for Best Cinematography	Once Upon a Time in Hollywood	Nominated
2019	Dublin Film Critics Circle Awards for Best Cinematography	Once Upon a Time in Hollywood	Nominated
2019	Houston Film Critics Society Awards for Best Cinematography	Once Upon a Time in Hollywood	Nominated
2019	Online Film Critics Society Awards for Best Cinematography	Once Upon a Time in Hollywood	Nominated
2019	Gold Derby Awards for Best Cinematography	Once Upon a Time in Hollywood	Nominated
