= Raised by Wolves (American TV series) =

2020 American science fiction series

- The opening titles
- Genre: Science fiction; Epic; Drama
- Created by: Aaron Guzikowski
- Starring: Amanda Collin; Abubakar Salim; Winta McGrath; Travis Fimmel; Niamh Algar; Jordan Loughran; Felix Jamieson; Ethan Hazzard; Aasiya Shah; Ivy Wong; Matias Varela
- Music by: Ben Frost; Marc Streitenfeld
- Country of origin: United States
- Original language: English
- No. of seasons: 2
- No. of episodes: 18

Production
- Executive producers: Aaron Guzikowski; Mark Huffam; David W. Zucker; Ridley Scott; Adam Kolbrenner; Jordan Sheehan
- Producer: Jon Kuyper
- Cinematography: Dariusz Wolski; Ross Emery; Erik Messerschmidt
- Editors: Claire Simpson; Michael Ruscio; Jennifer Barbot
- Running time: 42–55 minutes
- Production companies: Film Afrika; Lit Entertainment; Shadycat Productions; Scott Free Productions

Original release
- Network: HBO Max
- Release: September 3, 2020 – March 17, 2022

Raised by Wolves is an American science fiction drama television series created by Aaron Guzikowski for HBO Max. The first two episodes were directed by Ridley Scott, who also serves as an executive producer for the show. The series premiered on September 3, 2020. It was renewed for a second season shortly after its debut, which premiered on February 3, 2022.

The first season was met with generally positive reviews from critics, while the second season has received critical acclaim. By June 2022, the series was cancelled. It was removed from HBO Max in December 2022 but has appeared on other streaming platforms.

== Premise ==
Raised by Wolves centers on two androids, Father and Mother, tasked with raising human children on Kepler-22b after the Earth is destroyed by a great war. As religious differences threaten to tear apart the burgeoning colony of humans, the androids learn that controlling the beliefs of humans is a treacherous and difficult task.

== Cast and characters ==
=== Main ===
- Amanda Collin as Mother/Lamia, a powerful war android known as a 'Necromancer', reprogrammed to raise human children on Kepler-22b to establish an atheist colony.
- Abubakar Salim as Father, a generic service model android reprogrammed to protect and support the colony's children.
- Winta McGrath as Campion, the youngest and only survivor of six children born from embryos brought to Kepler-22b by Mother and Father. Munro Lennon-Ritchie portrays Campion at eight years old.
- Travis Fimmel as Marcus/Caleb, an atheist soldier and Mary's partner. Jack Hawkins portrays Caleb with his true face.
- Niamh Algar as Sue/Mary, an atheist soldier/medic and Caleb's partner. On Earth, she (Mary) and Caleb had killed a Mithraic couple, Sue and Marcus. Mary and Caleb altered their appearances to resemble the couple to get onto the Ark. Sienna Guillory portrays Mary with her true face.
- Jordan Loughran as Tempest, a surviving Ark child who despises the Mithraic due to having been raped by a religious leader.
- Felix Jamieson as Paul, the biological son of Marcus and Sue, raised by Caleb and Mary as their own child.
- Ethan Hazzard as Hunter, one of the surviving Ark young adults.
- Aasiya Shah as Holly, one of the surviving Ark children.
- Ivy Wong as Vita, one of the surviving Ark children.
- Matias Varela as Lucius, a loyal Mithraic soldier and survivor of the Ark crash.
- Peter Christoffersen as Cleaver (season 2)
- Selina Jones as Grandmother (season 2)
- Morgan Santo as Vrille (season 2)
- James Harkness as Tamerlane (season 2)
- Kim Engelbrecht as Decima (season 2)
- Jennifer Saayeng as Nerva (season 2)

=== Recurring ===
- Cosmo Jarvis as Campion Sturges, a former Mithraic scientist who renounced his faith, fought for the atheist cause, and created Mother. One of the colony children is his namesake.
- Michael Pennington as the Trust (voice role), a quantum computer programmed by Campion Sturges to administer the atheist collective on Kepler-22b.
- Joseph May as the Holo-Sphere (voice role)

=== Guest ===
- Steve Wall as Ambrose

== Episodes ==
=== Series overview ===
Season	Episodes	Originally released	
Season	Episodes	First released	Last released
1	10	September 3, 2020	October 1, 2020
2	8	February 3, 2022	March 17, 2022

=== Season 1 (2020) ===
No. overall	No. in season	Title	Directed by	Written by	Original release date
1	1	"Raised by Wolves"	Ridley Scott	Aaron Guzikowski	September 3, 2020
In the 22nd century, two androids, Mother and Father, escape an Earth devastated by war between militant atheists and a religious order known as the Mithraic to colonize the planet Kepler-22b. They bring twelve human embryos with them to begin a new peaceful civilization based on atheistic values. The planet has harsh conditions and is covered by large, seemingly bottomless pits. Twelve years later, only one child, Campion, has survived out of six children initially born. Mother starts malfunctioning; in her sleep she sees the war on Earth, and herself flying. As a Mithraic ship arrives in orbit, Father attempts to contact them to take care of Campion; Mother does not approve the plan, and disables Father in a confrontation; Campion sends a signal to the Mithraic. A group of the Mithraic arrive at the colony. After staying a night, they try to disable Mother and take Campion with them; they fail after Mother discovers new abilities and defeats them. Mother goes to the Mithraic ship in orbit; she takes control and sets the ship for collision with the planet; the ship crashes with a huge explosion. Mother returns to Campion with five children that she stole from the ship.
2	2	"Pentagram"	Ridley Scott	Aaron Guzikowski	September 3, 2020
Mother reactivates Father and they try to integrate the five Mithraic children—Tempest, Paul, Hunter, Holly, and Vita—into the colony. Mother is revealed to be a Necromancer, an android built for mass extermination, her powers being stored in her eyes. Campion grows concerned about Mother's behavior and begins questioning her intentions. Mother discovers that Tempest is pregnant, having been raped by a Mithraic priest while they were traveling from Earth. Mother intends to help her carry the child. Mysterious animals attack Tempest at the settlement, but Mother explodes them with her powers. Marcus, a Mithraic soldier who previously survived Mother's attempt on his life and has been hiding since, is also attacked by the animals, but survives and is rescued by other Mithraic survivors. A flashback reveals that Marcus and his wife Sue are imposters; they were atheistic soldiers who killed Paul's real parents and assumed their identities to get passage on the Mithraic evacuation ship.
3	3	"Virtual Faith"	Luke Scott	Aaron Guzikowski	September 3, 2020
When the Mithraic children begin exhibiting signs of illness, Campion, now openly distrustful of Mother, becomes convinced the android is trying to poison the new members of the settlement and leads an escape attempt. Desperate to save their son, Paul, from Mother's clutches, Marcus and Sue grow increasingly frustrated with Ambrose's indecision and his refusal to authorize a rescue mission. Father finds all of the escaped children except for Paul, who has become separated from the group. While Mother searches for Paul, he falls down a shaft.
4	4	"Nature's Course"	Luke Scott	Aaron Guzikowski	September 10, 2020
Concerned for their prospects for survival after he and Mother eventually cease to function, Father attempts to teach Campion and the Mithraic children to hunt the strange creatures that have suddenly appeared near the settlement. Tempest grows increasingly hostile toward Mother over the android's obsessive interest in her pregnancy. Tensions between Marcus and Ambrose come to a head when the Mithraic discover an ancient relic, believed by them to be the fulfillment of a Mithraic prophecy, and dissension arises among the order as to whether the group should remain at the artifact or rescue the children.
5	5	"Infected Memory"	Sergio Mimica-Gezzan	Heather Bellson	September 10, 2020
Now leader of the Mithraic, Marcus leads Sue and the rest of the order on a rescue mission, encountering a surprising new ally along the way. Campion and Paul grow to trust one another as they discover a potential new food source for the colony. While Mother discovers hidden memories within her memory banks that reveal the full import of her mission, Tempest's despair reaches breaking point. As the Mithraic draw close to the settlement, Marcus is haunted by a series of bizarre visions.
6	6	"Lost Paradise"	Sergio Mimica-Gezzan	Don Joh	September 17, 2020
Mother's prolonged absences from the settlement, spent interacting with a digital projection of her creator in a Mithraic simulator, threaten the safety of the colony. Marcus' plan to destroy Mother while she is plugged into the simulator goes horribly wrong. When Sue leads a Mithraic assault on the settlement, each of the Mithraic children are forced to reveal their true loyalties, culminating in game-changing consequences for Mother, Father and Campion.
7	7	"Faces"	Alex Gabassi	Karen Campbell	September 17, 2020
With Mother held captive and powerless by the Mithraic and Father reprogrammed, Campion is forced to choose whether to resist the Mithraic or ally himself with them. Marcus is disturbed to discover that Mother is aware of his true identity. Campion begins experiencing visions of Tally. As he attempts to destroy Mother once and for all, Marcus finds himself grappling with a tenuous hold on his leadership of the Mithraic, his relationships with both Sue and Paul, and his own sanity.
8	8	"Mass"	Alex Gabassi	Sinead Daly	September 24, 2020
Marcus' erratic shift towards devotion to Sol starts to push away Sue and Paul. Mother believes she is experiencing a malfunction but is confronted with shocking news that she is carrying a child. The Mithraic children make their own choices.
9	9	"Umbilical"	James Hawes	Aaron Guzikowski	September 24, 2020
Hunter digs further into Father's programming as the Mithraic grow increasingly concerned over Marcus' behavior. Mother searches for a safe place, and ends up confronting Sue. Tempest confronts her demons. Marcus is left alone to meet his fate.
10	10	"The Beginning"	Luke Scott	Aaron Guzikowski	October 1, 2020
Mother, Father, Sue and the children search for a more habitable place for Mother's baby. Paul continues to hear a voice like the one that drove Marcus insane; it reveals to him that Marcus and Sue are impostors so Paul shoots Sue. Mother finally gives birth and finds it's not a humanoid but a leech-like flying snake. She is disappointed and acknowledges her pregnancy did not have anything to do with her creator's programming but was caused by infection. Mother and Father discover that there were humans on the planet and suspect that the creatures they have been hunting are "devolved" humans that were somehow introduced to Kepler-22b. A deranged Marcus kills a scouting team of Atheists as an Atheist ship arrives. Father and Mother attempt suicide with the snake-like baby to protect their human children. However, they crash on the other side of the planet in what seems to be the planet's Tropical Zone; the fast-growing snake baby escapes and flies away.

=== Season 2 (2022) ===
No. overall	No. in season	Title	Directed by	Written by	Original release date
11	1	"The Collective"	Ernest Dickerson	Aaron Guzikowski	February 3, 2022
Mother and Father are recovered from the crashed lander by a passing Trust fruit harvesting team, who also find sheddings of the snake creature. After being partially recharged, Mother wakes and disables the techs. The Trust Controller interrupts the melee and requests a meeting with Mother, who recognizes its technological nature as a quantum computer managing The Colony, explaining a shared history with the Atheists and their creator. She is given safety with her recovered family, as well as a new mission, while the Trust hunts Marcus. After hijacking the pursuer and attempting a failed counterattack, Marcus uses an energy grapple to evade capture and hide amongst nearby rocks, discovering an intricate, preoccupied cave system with Mithraic symbology and artifacts. Mother and Father, reunited with Campion and family, establish a new Colony homestead in the bountiful Tropical Zone.
12	2	"Seven"	Ernest Dickerson	Aaron Guzikowski	February 3, 2022
13	3	"Good Creatures"	Sunu Gonera	Julian Meiojas	February 10, 2022
14	4	"Control"	Sunu Gonera	Karen Campbell	February 17, 2022
15	5	"King"	Alex Gabassi	Aaron Guzikowski	February 24, 2022
The grandmother android is awakened by Father, but it is not fully functional yet. Paul's cocooned body is on the verge of consuming him. Sue prays to Sol for Paul's cure and she hallucinates about a solution. Marcus and his team find a dilapidated temple that can only be opened from the inside. Marcus finds remnants of the planet's previous species, who were connected to Sol. Paul recovers and Sue is finally able to bond with him.
16	6	"The Tree"	Alex Gabassi	Aaron Guzikowski	March 3, 2022
17	7	"Feeding"	Lukas Ettlin	Aaron Guzikowski	March 10, 2022
18	8	"Happiness"	Lukas Ettlin	Aaron Guzikowski	March 17, 2022
Mother uses Grandmother's veil to block out her emotional attachment to No. 7 (the serpent). Mother kills the serpent and chooses to temporarily retain the veil, leaving the children under Grandmother and Father's care. Mother discovers that Grandmother intends to devolve this human colony into fish creatures of the sea, as her group of androids did to the previous generation of humans on Kepler-22b. Understanding this, Mother becomes emotionally unstable and the veil envelops her and shuts her down. Grandmother uses this opportunity to store her in a hibernation pod. Meanwhile, in search of the source of Sol, Marcus tries to return underground but Lucius, influenced by Sol's voice, disables and captures Marcus. Lucius then crucifies Marcus on the tree that shot out from No. 7's dead corpse. Later, Marcus appears floating in the air above the tree, in an inverted crucified state, released from his bonds and with blood dripping from his palms.

== Production ==
=== Development ===
On October 8, 2018, it was announced that TNT had given the production a series order. Executive producers were expected to include Ridley Scott, Aaron Guzikowski, David W. Zucker, Jordan Sheehan, Adam Kolbrenner, and Robyn Meisinger. Scott was also set to direct the first two episodes from Guzikowski's screenplays. Production companies included Scott Free Productions, Studio T, and Madhouse Entertainment.

On September 17, 2020, HBO Max renewed the series for a second season, which would also be produced in South Africa. It premiered on February 3, 2022.

On June 3, 2022, Father actor Abubakar Salim confirmed that the series had been cancelled after two seasons, citing the merger of WarnerMedia and Discovery, Inc. into Warner Bros. Discovery as the reason for the cancellation. He additionally announced that Scott Free Productions would be pushing to find the show a new home and asked fans to rally around the cause. Actors Niamh Algar and Winta McGrath also asked for fan support, leading to the development of an ongoing social media campaign dubbed "Save Raised by Wolves". Salim has stated that the campaign has "Inspired the creatives to look for new ways of potentially telling and finishing this story. We will get answers ... Just not in the same way we hoped."

=== Filming ===
The series was filmed in the Western Cape, specifically Springfontein Film Location Estate, Somerset West, Stellenbosch and Cape Town, South Africa. On March 8, 2021, Salim announced that filming for the second season was in progress. Jennifer Saayeng, who plays Nerva in the second season, announced on Instagram that the filming for second season wrapped on August 15, 2021.

=== Casting ===
In January 2019, it was announced that Travis Fimmel, Amanda Collin, Abubakar Salim, Winta McGrath, Niamh Algar, Felix Jamieson, Ethan Hazzard, Jordan Loughran, Aasiya Shah, and Ivy Wong had been cast in starring roles. In March 2019, Matias Varela was cast in a starring role. On May 20, 2021, Peter Christoffersen, Selina Jones, Morgan Santo, James Harkness, Kim Engelbrecht, and Jennifer Saayeng joined the cast in starring roles for the second season.

== Release ==
=== Broadcast and streaming ===
On October 29, 2019, it was announced the series would be moving to WarnerMedia's HBO Max streaming service. The series premiered on September 3, 2020.

In Canada, the series premiered on September 3, 2020, on CraveTV and CTV Sci-Fi Channel, and in French on January 14, 2021, on Super Écran. In Australia, the series premiered on September 3, 2020, on Fox Showcase. In the UK, the first three episodes were shown on Sky Atlantic on December 5, 2020. In France, the series premiered on December 7, 2020, on Warner TV. In Italy, it started on February 8, 2021, on Sky Atlantic.

The series was removed from HBO Max in December 2022. On January 31, 2023, it was announced that the series would be released on The Roku Channel and Tubi.

=== Podcast ===
On August 26, 2020, an official companion podcast produced by iHeartRadio was announced with the first episode premiering on September 3, 2020, in tandem with the launch of the series. The podcast features Aaron Guzikowski and invites "innovators from science and technology to discuss the most fascinating questions raised by the series."

== Reception ==
For the first season, review aggregator Rotten Tomatoes reported an approval rating of 74% based on 58 critics, with an average rating of 7.1/10. The website's critics consensus reads, "Bristling with imagination and otherworldly imagery, Raised by Wolves is a bloody exploration of artificial intelligence and religious belief that will stimulate the eye and mind—if not the heart." Metacritic gave the series a weighted average score of 64 out of 100 based on 19 reviews, indicating "generally favorable reviews". Darren Franich of Entertainment Weekly gave the series a B− and wrote a review saying, "I've seen six episodes, and worry that the momentum drags. This is the kind of show where two sides fight, and then spend half a season preparing to fight again. The eccentric performances are intriguing, though." John Anderson of The Wall Street Journal said, "The storyline is involved, but keeps a viewer off-balance in a good way. It looks great. And Mother... is the most memorable female/female-like space entity since Sigourney Weaver's Ripley in Alien." Writing for RogerEbert.com, Nick Allen gave the series a mixed review, lamenting that, "intellectual exploration of this story ... is incredibly cold" and comparing it to Scott's 2012 film Prometheus.

For the second season, Rotten Tomatoes reported an 86% approval rating with an average rating of 7.9/10, based on 14 critic reviews. The website's critics consensus states, "Raised by Wolves' sophomore season doubles down on everything that made it so beguiling—and sometimes off-putting—in the first place, and the gamble pays off with a science fiction vision that feels wholly its own." Metacritic assigned a score of 84 out of 100 based on 6 critics, indicating "universal acclaim".
