= Bruno Delbonnel =

French cinematographer (born 1957)

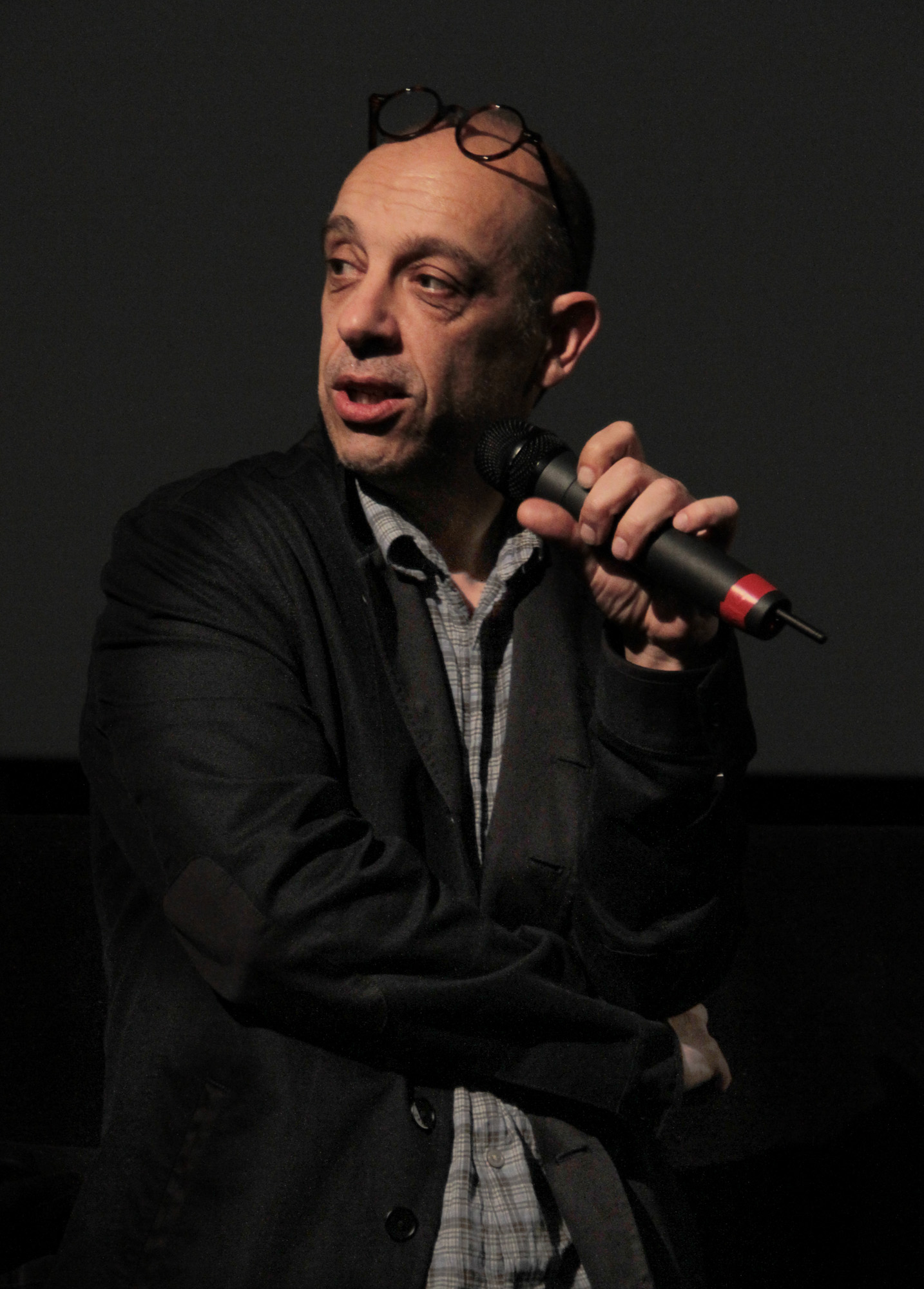
- Delbonnel in 2012
- Born: 1957 (age 68–69); Nancy, France
- Education: ESEC
- Years active: 1981–present

Bruno Delbonnel, ASC, AFC, (born 1957) is a French cinematographer, known for working with high-profile directors including Jean-Pierre Jeunet, Tim Burton, the Coen brothers, Joe Wright, and Wes Anderson.

== Life and career ==
Delbonnel was born in Nancy, Meurthe-et-Moselle, France and graduated in 1978 from the ESEC (Paris, Île-de-France).

Delbonnel's accolades include a César Award and a European Film Award, as well as six Academy Award nominations and four BAFTA Award nominations.

He was appointed in 2019 as the head of the cinematography department of the Paris film school, La Fémis.

== Style ==
His work tends to feature stylised colour palettes, often featuring yellows and greens as prominent and ubiquitous colours, which tint the whole image. Also, often in his work, the film stock has a very apparent, well-defined grain structure.

== Filmography ==
=== Cinematographer ===
Short film

Year	Title	Director	Notes
1984	Pas de repos pour Billy Brakko	Jean-Pierre Jeunet	
1993	Jour de fauche	Vincent Monner	
1996	Regarde-moi	Gabrielle Lazure	
2006	Tuileries	Coen Brothers	Segment of Paris, je t'aime
2016	Come Together: A Fashion Picture in Motion	Wes Anderson	

Feature film

Year	Title	Director
1993	Not Everybody's Lucky Enough to Have Communist Parents (Note: Shared credit with Thierry Jault)	Jean-Jacques Zilbermann
2001	The Cat's Meow	Peter Bogdanovich
2001	Amélie	Jean-Pierre Jeunet
2003	Not For, or Against	Cédric Klapisch
2004	A Very Long Engagement	Jean-Pierre Jeunet
2006	Infamous	Douglas McGrath
2007	Across the Universe	Julie Taymor
2009	Harry Potter and the Half-Blood Prince	David Yates
2011	Faust	Alexander Sokurov
2012	Dark Shadows	Tim Burton
2013	Inside Llewyn Davis	Coen brothers
2014	Big Eyes	Tim Burton
2014	Francofonia	Aleksandr Sokurov
2016	Miss Peregrine's Home for Peculiar Children	Tim Burton
2017	Darkest Hour	Joe Wright
2018	The Ballad of Buster Scruggs	Coen Brothers
2021	The Woman in the Window	Joe Wright
2021	The Tragedy of Macbeth	Joel Coen
2025	The Phoenician Scheme	Wes Anderson
2027	Jack of Spades	Joel Coen

Television

Year	Title	Director	Notes
2024	Disclaimer	Alfonso Cuarón	Miniseries; Shared credit with Emmanuel Lubezki

=== Other credits ===
Director

- The Grand Circus (1989) (Documentary film)
- Paso doble (2006) (Documentary short)

Writer

- Things I Like, Things I Don't Like (Foutaises) (1989) (Short film)

Actor

- The French Dispatch (2021) (As François-Marie Charvet)

== Awards and nominations ==
Delbonnel's star on the Bitola Walk of Fame.

Academy Awards

Year	Title	Category	Result
2001	Amélie	Best Cinematography	Nominated
2004	A Very Long Engagement	Best Cinematography	Nominated
2009	Harry Potter and the Half-Blood Prince	Best Cinematography	Nominated
2013	Inside Llewyn Davis	Best Cinematography	Nominated
2017	Darkest Hour	Best Cinematography	Nominated
2021	The Tragedy of Macbeth	Best Cinematography	Nominated

BAFTA Awards

Year	Title	Category	Result
2001	Amélie	Best Cinematography	Nominated
2013	Inside Llewyn Davis	Best Cinematography	Nominated
2017	Darkest Hour	Best Cinematography	Nominated
2021	The Tragedy of Macbeth	Best Cinematography	Nominated

American Society of Cinematographers

Year	Title	Category	Result
2001	Amélie	Outstanding Achievement in Cinematography	Nominated
2004	A Very Long Engagement	Outstanding Achievement in Cinematography	Won
2013	Inside Llewyn Davis	Outstanding Achievement in Cinematography	Nominated
2017	Darkest Hour	Outstanding Achievement in Cinematography	Nominated
2021	The Tragedy of Macbeth	Outstanding Achievement in Cinematography	Nominated

César Awards

Year	Title	Category	Result
2001	Amélie	Best Cinematography	Nominated
2004	A Very Long Engagement	Best Cinematography	Won

Satelitte Awards

Year	Title	Category	Result
2004	A Very Long Engagement	Best Cinematography	Nominated
2007	Across the Universe	Best Cinematography	Nominated
2011	Faust	Best Cinematography	Nominated
2013	Inside Llewyn Davis	Best Cinematography	Won
2017	Darkest Hour	Best Cinematography	Nominated
2021	The Tragedy of Macbeth	Best Cinematography	Nominated

European Film Award

Year	Title	Category	Result
2001	Amélie	Best Cinematographer	Won
2004	A Very Long Engagement	Best Cinematographer	Nominated
2011	Faust	Best Cinematographer	Nominated

Other awards

Year	Award	Category	Title	Result
2013	Boston Online Film Critics Association	Best Cinematography	Inside Llewyn Davis	Won
2013	New York Film Critics Circle Awards	Best Cinematography	Inside Llewyn Davis	Won
2013	National Society of Film Critics Awards	Best Cinematography	Inside Llewyn Davis	Won
2013	Independent Spirit Awards	Best Cinematography	Inside Llewyn Davis	Nominated
2013	San Diego Film Critics Society	Best Cinematography	Inside Llewyn Davis	Nominated
2013	St. Louis Gateway Film Critics Association	Best Cinematography	Inside Llewyn Davis	Nominated
2013	Washington D.C. Area Film Critics Association	Best Cinematography	Inside Llewyn Davis	Nominated
2013	Chicago Film Critics Association	Best Cinematography	Inside Llewyn Davis	Nominated
2013	Broadcast Film Critics Association	Best Cinematography	Inside Llewyn Davis	Nominated
2013	Online Film Critics Society	Best Cinematography	Inside Llewyn Davis	Nominated
2013	Florida Film Critics Circle	Best Cinematography	Inside Llewyn Davis	Nominated
2013	Phoenix Film Critics Society	Best Cinematography	Inside Llewyn Davis	Nominated
2017	Austin Film Critics Association	Best Cinematography	Darkest Hour	Nominated
2017	Phoenix Film Critics Society	Best Cinematography	Darkest Hour	Nominated
2017	St. Louis Gateway Film Critics Association	Best Cinematography	Darkest Hour	Nominated
2018	San Diego Film Critics Society	Best Cinematography	The Ballad of Buster Scruggs	Won
2018	North Carolina Film Critics Association	Best Cinematography	The Ballad of Buster Scruggs	Nominated
