= Jack Hawkins (actor, born 1985) =

English actor (1985-)

- Born: Jack Tregilgas Hawkins; 6 October 1985 (age 40); Ipswich, Suffolk, England
- Occupation: Actor
- Years active: 2009–present
- Spouse: Camilla Arfwedson (m. 2019)

Jack Tregilgas Hawkins (born 6 October 1985) is an English actor, known for his work on the BBC One series Call the Midwife and the HBO Max series Raised by Wolves.

== Early life ==
He was born in Ipswich and was educated at the Ipswich School between 1996 and 2004, where he was Head Boy. He read Jurisprudence at Balliol College, Oxford and trained at the London Academy of Music and Dramatic Art from 2007 to 2009.

== Career ==
Hawkins has performed acting roles in film, on television and on the stage. In 2017 he joined the cast of the BBC television show Call the Midwife as Christopher Dockerill. He played the recurring character Alex Lambert in the BBC medical drama Holby City, and appeared as Mickey Aluffi in the 2016 film The Head Hunter, and Phil in Writers Retreat. In 2014 Hawkins played the part of William in the film The Cross, which was filmed in various locations in northern England. He appeared in Trevor Nunn's adaptation of Sebastian Faulk's novel Birdsong, and Cheek by Jowl's 2012-3 production of 'Tis Pity She's a Whore. In 2015, he appeared in Lindsay Posner's West End production of Harvey alongside Maureen Lipman and James Dreyfus.

== Filmography ==
=== Television ===
Year	Film/TV	Role	Notes
2020	Raised by Wolves	Caleb	HBO Max
2019	Endeavour	Murray Creswell	ITV
2019	Midsomer Murders (Episode: "A Point of Balance")	Jake Hannity	ITV
2017	Call the Midwife	Christopher Dockerill	BBC
2017	Harlots	Mr Bancroft	ITV/Hulu
2016	The Head Hunter	Mickey Aluffi	
2016-17	Holby City	Alex Lambert	BBC
2015	Henry & Anne: The Lovers Who Changed History	King Henry VIII	

=== Theatre ===
Year	Production	Role	Director	Theatre/Producer
2016	Harvey	Sanderson	Lindsay Posner	Theatre Royal Haymarket
2013	Hedda Gabler	Jørgen Tesman	Laurie Sansom	Royal & Derngate, Northampton
2011	'Tis Pity She's a Whore	Soranzo	Declan Donnellan	Cheek by Jowl
2011	Rosencrantz and Guildenstern Are Dead	Hamlet	Trevor Nunn	Theatre Royal Haymarket & Chichester Festival
2010	Birdsong	Levi	Trevor Nunn	Comedy Theatre/Harold Pinter Theatre
2010	Otieno (a modern-day retelling of Othello)	Iago	Poppy Burton-Morgan	Southwark Playhouse, London

=== Video games ===
Year	Game	Role	Notes
2020	Call of Duty: Vanguard	Lieutenant Robert Jacobs	North African campaign only
2023	Rainbow Six Siege X	Fenrir	Swedish defender
