= Prisoners (2013 film) =

2013 film by Denis Villeneuve

- Theatrical release poster
- Directed by: Denis Villeneuve
- Written by: Aaron Guzikowski
- Produced by: Broderick Johnson; Kira Davis; Andrew A. Kosove; Adam Kolbrenner
- Starring: Hugh Jackman; Jake Gyllenhaal; Viola Davis; Maria Bello; Terrence Howard; Melissa Leo; Paul Dano
- Cinematography: Roger A. Deakins
- Edited by: Joel Cox; Gary D. Roach
- Music by: Jóhann Jóhannsson
- Production companies: Alcon Entertainment; 8:38 Productions; Madhouse Entertainment
- Distributed by: Warner Bros. Pictures (United States, Canada, Australia, New Zealand, Italy and Spain); Summit Entertainment (International)
- Release dates: August 30, 2013 (Telluride); September 20, 2013 (United States)
- Running time: 153 minutes
- Country: United States
- Language: English
- Budget: $46 million
- Box office: $122.1 million

Prisoners is a 2013 American crime thriller film directed by Denis Villeneuve and written by Aaron Guzikowski. The film has an ensemble cast including Hugh Jackman, Jake Gyllenhaal, Viola Davis, Maria Bello, Terrence Howard, Melissa Leo, and Paul Dano.

The film follows the abduction of two young girls in Pennsylvania and the subsequent search for the perpetrator by the police. After police arrest a young suspect and release him, the father of one of the daughters takes matters into his own hands.

Prisoners premiered at the Telluride Film Festival on August 30, 2013, and was released to theaters on September 20, 2013. The film was a financial and critical success, grossing $122 million worldwide against a production budget of $46 million. It was chosen by the National Board of Review as one of the top 10 films of 2013, and at the 86th Academy Awards, Roger Deakins was nominated for Best Cinematography in addition to receiving a nomination from the American Society of Cinematographers.

== Plot ==
In the fictional city of Conyers, Pennsylvania, the Dover and Birch families celebrate Thanksgiving together. After dinner, girls Anna Dover and Joy Birch go missing after playing on a parked RV. Detective Loki responds to a police call about an RV matching the description and arrests the man inside, Alex Jones. During interrogation, Loki realizes Alex's diminished IQ prevents him from planning a kidnapping and his RV contains no forensic evidence. Loki runs down leads on local sex offenders and finds a corpse in the house of priest Patrick Dunn. Dunn admits to killing him after the man confessed to murdering 16 children for his "war on God".

The police release Alex to his aunt, Holly. Convinced of Alex's guilt, Keller Dover, the father of Anna, assaults him outside the police station, where Alex whispers to him, "They didn't cry 'til I left them." After Loki finds no proof of this, Keller kidnaps Alex and takes him to an empty building Keller owns. With the reluctant help of Joy's father, Franklin Birch, Keller begins to torture Alex for information about their daughters. Franklin, on the verge of releasing Alex, is convinced not to by his wife Nancy, but the pair decide not to stop Keller or alert the police. Loki starts investigating cases of missing children in Conyers which ultimately leads him to visiting a lady whose child went missing even before Loki's time.

At a vigil for the girls, Loki approaches a suspicious man who flees. Loki releases a sketch of him to the community. The suspect sneaks into the Birch and Dover houses. Grace, Keller's wife, hears him and calls Loki. He tails Keller to the empty building, where Keller claims he goes to drink, but Loki does not find Alex. Loki arrests the suspect, Bob Taylor, at his house. The walls are covered in maze drawings and Loki opens crates filled with snakes and bloody children's clothes. Loki shows Keller and the Birch parents photos of the bloody clothes, and they identify several as Joy's and Anna's. As Taylor draws detailed mazes, Loki assaults him, demanding the location of the girls. Taylor grabs an officer's gun and kills himself.

Keller continues torturing Alex, who cryptically talks about a maze. Keller visits Alex's aunt Holly, learning that Alex's stuttering stems from a childhood accident involving snakes her husband kept. Holly and her husband lost their faith after their son died of cancer, and adopted Alex as a way to cope. Loki matches the maze pattern in Taylor's drawings to a necklace depicting a maze worn by the corpse in Dunn's house. At Taylor's house, Loki is informed that most of the bloody clothes are store-bought and soaked with pig blood. Below a window outside the Dover house, Loki finds Taylor's footprints and a sock matching Anna's.

The drugged Anna and Joy attempt to escape, but only Joy succeeds and is hospitalized. Joy remembers little, but when questioned by Keller, tells him, "You were there." He immediately rushes out. Loki gives chase and arrives at Keller's building, finding Alex. Keller goes to Holly's to find Anna and Holly pulls a gun. She explains that before the disappearance of her husband (implied to be the corpse in Dunn's basement), they abducted children as part of their war on God to avenge their son's death, and to create demons out of the traumatized parents. Alex was their first abduction, and Taylor was their second. Holly imprisons the wounded Keller in a hidden pit in her yard, where he finds his daughter's whistle.

Loki enters Holly's house and finds a photo of her late husband wearing the maze necklace. Realizing that Holly is the kidnapper, he finds her giving Anna an injection. In a shootout, Loki kills Holly but is grazed in the head. He rushes Anna to the hospital while fighting unconsciousness. The next morning, a recuperating Anna and Joy visit Loki in his hospital room to thank him. Later, Loki wanders the crime scene at Holly's house, when he faintly hears a whistle blowing, and moves in the direction of the sound.

== Cast ==
- Hugh Jackman as Keller Dover
- Jake Gyllenhaal as Detective Loki
- Viola Davis as Nancy Birch
- Maria Bello as Grace Dover
- Terrence Howard as Franklin Birch
- Melissa Leo as Holly Jones
- Paul Dano as Alex Jones
- Dylan Minnette as Ralph Dover
- Zoë Soul as Eliza Birch
- Erin Gerasimovich as Anna Dover
- Kyla-Drew Simmons as Joy Birch
- Wayne Duvall as Captain Richard O'Malley
- Len Cariou as Father Patrick Dunn
- David Dastmalchian as Bob Taylor
- Brad James as Officer Carter
- Dennis Christopher as Mr. Jones (uncredited)
- Sandra Ellis Lafferty as Mrs. Milland

== Production ==
Aaron Guzikowski wrote the script for the 2009 Annual Black List, and based on a short story he wrote, involving "a father whose kid was struck by a hit-and-run driver and then puts this guy in a well in his backyard". That short story was partially inspired by Edgar Allan Poe's "The Tell-Tale Heart".

After Guzikowski wrote the spec script, many actors and directors entered and exited the project, including actors Christian Bale and Leonardo DiCaprio and directors Antoine Fuqua and Bryan Singer. Once Denis Villeneuve was brought onto the project, Timothée Chalamet unsuccessfully auditioned for a role. They eventually went on to work together with Chalamet playing Paul Atreides in Villeneuve's Dune trilogy (2021-2026).

Ultimately, Guzikowski would credit producer Mark Wahlberg for getting the project on its feet, stating, "He was totally pivotal in getting the film made. That endorsement helped it get around". Principal photography began in Georgia in February 2013.

=== Filming ===
Principal photography for Prisoners began in Georgia in February 2013 and concluded in May 2013. The production, initially planned for Connecticut, was moved to Georgia for budgetary reasons. Filming took place in and around Atlanta, Conyers, Monroe, Porterdale, Lithonia, Stone Mountain, and Tucker.

== Release ==
=== MPAA rating ===
Prisoners premiered at the 2013 Telluride Film Festival and was released theatrically in Canada and the United States on September 20, 2013. It was originally rated NC-17 by the MPAA "for substantial disturbing violent content and explicit images"; after being edited, it was re-rated R "for disturbing violent content including torture, and language throughout".

=== Box office ===
Prisoners opened in North America on September 20, 2013, in 3,260 theaters and grossed $20,817,053 in its opening weekend, averaging $6,386 per theater and ranking #1 at the box office. After 77 days in theaters, the film ended up earning $61,002,302 domestically and $61,124,385 internationally, earning a worldwide gross of $122,126,687, above its production budget of $46 million.

=== Home media ===
Prisoners was released by Warner Home Video on DVD and Blu-ray on December 17, 2013, in the United States and United Kingdom on February 3, 2014.

== Reception ==
=== Critical response ===
On review aggregator website Rotten Tomatoes, the film has an approval rating of 81% based on 249 reviews. The website's critical consensus states: "Prisoners has an emotional complexity and a sense of dread that makes for absorbing (and disturbing) viewing." On Metacritic, the film has a weighted average score of 70 out of 100, based on 53 critics, indicating "generally favorable reviews".

Christopher Orr of The Atlantic wrote: "Ethical exploration or exploitation? In the end, I come down reservedly on the former side: the work done here by Jackman, Gyllenhaal, and especially Villeneuve is simply too powerful to ignore." Ed Gibbs of The Sun Herald wrote: "Not since Erskineville Kings, in 1999, has Hugh Jackman appeared so emotionally exposed on screen. It is an exceptional, Oscar-worthy performance." Peter Travers of Rolling Stone wrote that Gyllenhaal was "exceptional" and that "Villeneuve takes his unflashy time building character and revealing troubled psyches in the most unlikely of places."

The film was a second runner-up for the BlackBerry People's Choice Award at the 2013 Toronto International Film Festival, behind Philomena and 12 Years a Slave. Gyllenhaal received the Best Supporting Actor of the Year Award at the 2013 Hollywood Film Festival for his "truly compelling, subtly layered" performance as Detective Loki.

In 2025, it was one of the films voted for the "Readers' Choice" edition of The New York Times' list of "The 100 Best Movies of the 21st Century", finishing at number 121.

Not all reviews were positive, however. Writing in The New Republic, David Thomson declared that the film was "weary after ten minutes" and furthermore "hideous, cruel, degrading, depressing, relentless, prolonged, humorless, claustrophobic, and a mockery of any surviving tradition in which films are entertaining". A mixed review came from Sheila O'Malley of RogerEbert.com, who gave the film 2.5 stars out of a possible 4. She wrote that Jackman's performance grew "monotonous" and that the film sometimes verged on pretentiousness, but was redeemed by a few excellent suspense sequences and Gyllenhaal's performance, whose "subtlety is welcome considering all the teeth gnashing going on in other performances".

=== Audiences ===
Audiences polled by CinemaScore gave the film a grade "B+" on an A+ to F scale, but Warner Bros asked for a recount by the service and later said the film received a grade "A−".

=== Top ten lists ===
Prisoners was listed on various critics' top ten lists.

- 1st – Nigel M. Smith, IndieWire
- 2nd – Rex Reed, The New York Observer
- 5th – Justin Robar, BridgewatersFinest
- 6th – Kyle Smith, New York Post
- 7th – James Berardinelli, Reelviews
- 7th – Barbara Vancheri, Pittsburgh Post-Gazette
- 9th – Owen Gleiberman, Entertainment Weekly
- Top 10 (listed alphabetically, not ranked) – Calvin Wilson, St. Louis Post-Dispatch

=== Accolades ===
Award	Date of ceremony	Category	Recipient(s)	Result
Academy Awards	March 2, 2014	Best Cinematography	Roger Deakins	Nominated
American Society of Cinematographers	February 1, 2014	Outstanding Achievement in Cinematography in Theatrical Releases	Roger Deakins	Nominated
Chicago Film Critics Association	December 16, 2013	Best Cinematography	Roger Deakins	Nominated
Critics' Choice Movie Awards	January 16, 2014	Best Cinematography	Roger Deakins	Nominated
Empire Awards	March 30, 2014	Best Thriller		Nominated
Hollywood Film Festival	October 21, 2013	Best Supporting Actor	Jake Gyllenhaal	Won
Key Art Awards	October 24, 2013	Best Teaser – Audio/Visual	"Ticking"	Bronze
Make-Up Artists and Hair Stylists Guild Awards	February 15, 2014	Best Contemporary Make-Up	Donald Mowat and Pamela Westmore	Won
National Board of Review	December 4, 2013	Best Cast	Hugh Jackman, Jake Gyllenhaal, Viola Davis, Maria Bello, Terrence Howard, Melissa Leo, Paul Dano and Dylan Minnette	Won
National Board of Review	December 4, 2013	Top Ten Films		Won
People's Choice Awards	January 8, 2014	Favorite Dramatic Movie		Nominated
San Diego Film Critics Society	December 11, 2013	Best Cinematography	Roger Deakins	Nominated
San Diego Film Critics Society	December 11, 2013	Best Performance by an Ensemble		Nominated
San Diego Film Critics Society	December 11, 2013	Best Original Screenplay	Aaron Guzikowski	Nominated
Satellite Awards	February 23, 2014	Best Cinematography	Roger Deakins	Nominated
Satellite Awards	February 23, 2014	Best Editing	Gary D. Roach and Joel Cox	Nominated
Satellite Awards	February 23, 2014	Best Supporting Actor – Motion Picture	Jake Gyllenhaal	Nominated
Saturn Awards	June 26, 2014	Best Make-up	Donald Mowat	Won
Saturn Awards	June 26, 2014	Best Supporting Actress	Melissa Leo	Nominated
Saturn Awards	June 26, 2014	Best Thriller Film		Nominated
Toronto International Film Festival	September 15, 2013	People's Choice Award	Denis Villeneuve	3rd Place
Washington D.C. Area Film Critics Association	December 9, 2013	Best Ensemble		Nominated

== Soundtrack ==
The Prisoners soundtrack, composed by Jóhann Jóhannsson, was released on September 20, 2013.

== See also ==
- The Secret in Their Eyes (2009), an Argentine-Spanish film which includes a theme of suspect kidnapping
