= Satellite Award for Best Cinematography =

Award from the International Press Academy

- Awarded for: Best Cinematography
- Country: United States
- Presented by: International Press Academy
- First award: 1996
- Currently held by: Adolpho Veloso – Train Dreams (2025)
- Website: www.pressacademy.com

The Satellite Award for Best Cinematography is one of the annual Satellite Awards given by the International Press Academy.

== Winners and nominees ==
=== 1990s ===
Year	Film	Cinematographer
1996	The English Patient	John Seale
1996	Breaking the Waves	Robby Müller
1996	Evita	Darius Khondji
1996	Hamlet	Alex Thomson
1996	Romeo + Juliet	Donald M. McAlpine
1997	Amistad	Janusz Kamiński
1997	Contact	Don Burgess
1997	Eve's Bayou	Amy Vincent
1997	L.A. Confidential	Dante Spinotti
1997	Titanic	Russell Carpenter
1998	The Thin Red Line	John Toll
1998	Beloved	Tak Fujimoto
1998	Pleasantville	John Lindley
1998	Saving Private Ryan	Janusz Kamiński
1998	Shakespeare in Love	Richard Greatrex
1999	Sleepy Hollow	Emmanuel Lubezki
1999	American Beauty	Conrad L. Hall
1999	Anna and the King	Caleb Deschanel
1999	Eyes Wide Shut	Larry Smith
1999	Snow Falling on Cedars	Robert Richardson
1999	The Talented Mr. Ripley	John Seale

=== 2000s ===
Year	Film	Cinematographer(s)
2000	Gladiator	John Mathieson
2000	Crouching Tiger, Hidden Dragon (Wo hu cang long)	Peter Pau
2000	The Legend of Bagger Vance	Michael Ballhaus
2000	Mission: Impossible 2	Jeffrey L. Kimball
2000	Traffic	Peter Andrews
2001	The Man Who Wasn't There	Roger Deakins
2001	Hearts in Atlantis	Piotr Sobociński
2001	The Lord of the Rings: The Fellowship of the Ring	Andrew Lesnie
2001	Moulin Rouge!	Donald M. McAlpine
2001	Pearl Harbor	John Schwartzman
2002	Road to Perdition	Conrad L. Hall
2002	Far from Heaven	Edward Lachman
2002	Gangs of New York	Michael Ballhaus
2002	The Lord of the Rings: The Two Towers	Andrew Lesnie
2002	Minority Report	Janusz Kamiński
2003	The Last Samurai	John Toll
2003	Girl with a Pearl Earring	Eduardo Serra
2003	The Lord of the Rings: The Return of the King	Andrew Lesnie
2003	Master and Commander: The Far Side of the World	Russell Boyd and Sandi Sissel
2003	Mystic River	Tom Stern
2003	Seabiscuit	John Schwartzman
2004	House of Flying Daggers (Shi mian mai fu)	Xiaoding Zhao
2004	The Aviator	Robert Richardson
2004	Lemony Snicket's A Series of Unfortunate Events	Emmanuel Lubezki
2004	The Phantom of the Opera	John Mathieson
2004	Spider-Man 2	Bill Pope and Anette Haellmigk
2004	A Very Long Engagement (Un long dimanche de fiançailles)	Bruno Delbonnel
2005	The Constant Gardener	César Charlone
2005	2046	Christopher Doyle
2005	Charlie and the Chocolate Factory	Philippe Rousselot
2005	Good Night, and Good Luck	Robert Elswit
2005	Kung Fu Hustle (Kung Fu)	Hang Sang Poon
2005	Memoirs of a Geisha	Dion Beebe
2005	Sin City	Robert Rodriguez
2006	Flags of Our Fathers	Tom Stern
2006	The Black Dahlia	Vilmos Zsigmond
2006	Curse of the Golden Flower (Man cheng jin dai huang jin jia)	Xiaoding Zhao
2006	The Fountain	Matthew Libatique
2006	A Good Year	Philippe Le Sourd
2006	The House of Sand (Casa de areia)	Ricardo Della Rosa
2006	X-Men: The Last Stand	Dante Spinotti
2007	The Diving Bell and the Butterfly (Le scaphandre et le papillon)	Janusz Kamiński
2007	Across the Universe	Bruno Delbonnel
2007	The Assassination of Jesse James by the Coward Robert Ford	Roger Deakins
2007	The Golden Compass	Henry Braham
2007	There Will Be Blood	Robert Elswit
2007	Zodiac	Harris Savides
2008	Australia	Mandy Walker
2008	Brideshead Revisited	Jess Hall
2008	Changeling	Tom Stern
2008	The Curious Case of Benjamin Button	Claudio Miranda
2008	The Duchess	Gyula Pados
2008	Snow Angels	Tim Orr
2009	Nine	Dion Beebe
2009	Inglourious Basterds	Robert Richardson
2009	It Might Get Loud	Guillermo Navarro and Erich Roland
2009	Public Enemies	Dante Spinotti
2009	Red Cliff (Chi bi)	Lü Yue and Zhang Li
2009	A Serious Man	Roger Deakins

=== 2010s ===
Year	Film	Cinematographer(s)
2010	Inception	Wally Pfister
2010	127 Hours	Anthony Dod Mantle and Enrique Chediak
2010	Harry Potter and the Deathly Hallows – Part 1	Eduardo Serra
2010	I Am Love	Yorick Le Saux
2010	Salt	Robert Elswit
2010	Secretariat	Dean Semler
2010	Shutter Island	Robert Richardson
2010	Unstoppable	Ben Seresin
2011	War Horse	Janusz Kamiński
2011	The Artist	Guillaume Schiffman
2011	Drive	Newton Thomas Sigel
2011	Faust	Bruno Delbonnel
2011	Hugo	Robert Richardson
2011	The Tree of Life	Emmanuel Lubezki
2012	Life of Pi	Claudio Miranda
2012	Anna Karenina	Seamus McGarvey
2012	Beasts of the Southern Wild	Ben Richardson
2012	Lincoln	Janusz Kamiński
2012	The Master	Mihai Mălaimare Jr.
2012	Skyfall	Roger Deakins
2013	Inside Llewyn Davis	Bruno Delbonnel
2013	12 Years a Slave	Sean Bobbitt
2013	Gravity	Emmanuel Lubezki
2013	Prisoners	Roger Deakins
2013	Rush	Anthony Dod Mantle
2013	The Secret Life of Walter Mitty	Stuart Dryburgh
2014	Mr. Turner	Dick Pope
2014	Birdman	Emmanuel Lubezki
2014	Gone Girl	Jeff Cronenweth
2014	Inherent Vice	Robert Elswit
2014	Interstellar	Hoyte van Hoytema
2014	The Theory of Everything	Benoît Delhomme
2015	Mad Max: Fury Road	John Seale
2015	Bridge of Spies	Janusz Kamiński
2015	The Martian	Dariusz Wolski
2015	The Revenant	Emmanuel Lubezki
2015	Sicario	Roger Deakins
2015	Spectre	Hoyte van Hoytema
2016	The Jungle Book	Bill Pope
2016	Billy Lynn's Long Halftime Walk	John Toll
2016	Hacksaw Ridge	Simon Duggan
2016	The Happiest Day in the Life of Olli Mäki (Hymyilevä mies)	Jani-Petteri Passi
2016	La La Land	Linus Sandgren
2016	Moonlight	James Laxton
2017	Blade Runner 2049	Roger Deakins
2017	Darkest Hour	Bruno Delbonnel
2017	Dunkirk	Hoyte van Hoytema
2017	Lady Bird	Sam Levy
2017	The Shape of Water	Dan Laustsen
2017	Three Billboards Outside Ebbing, Missouri	Ben Davis
2018	A Star Is Born	Matthew Libatique
2018	Black Panther	Rachel Morrison
2018	Cold War	Łukasz Żal
2018	The Favourite	Robbie Ryan
2018	If Beale Street Could Talk	James Laxton
2018	Roma	Alfonso Cuarón
2019	1917	Roger Deakins
2019	Ford v Ferrari	Phedon Papamichael
2019	The Irishman	Rodrigo Prieto
2019	Joker	Lawrence Sher
2019	Motherless Brooklyn	Dick Pope
2019	Rocketman	George Richmond

=== 2020s ===
Year	Film	Cinematographer(s)
2020	Mank	Erik Messerschmidt
2020	The Midnight Sky	Martin Ruhe
2020	News of the World	Dariusz Wolski
2020	Nomadland	Joshua James Richards
2020	One Night in Miami...	Tami Reiker
2020	Tenet	Hoyte van Hoytema
2021	Dune	Greig Fraser
2021	Belfast	Haris Zambarloukos
2021	C'mon C'mon	Robbie Ryan
2021	The Power of the Dog	Ari Wegner
2021	tick, tick... BOOM!	Alice Brooks
2021	The Tragedy of Macbeth	Bruno Delbonnel
2022	Top Gun: Maverick	Claudio Miranda
2022	Avatar: The Way of Water	Russell Carpenter
2022	Babylon	Linus Sandgren
2022	The Banshees of Inisherin	Ben Davis
2022	Elvis	Mandy Walker
2022	Empire of Light	Roger Deakins
2023	Maestro	Matthew Libatique
2023	Ferrari	Erik Messerschmidt
2023	Killers of the Flower Moon	Rodrigo Prieto
2023	Mission: Impossible – Dead Reckoning Part One	Fraser Taggart
2023	Napoleon	Dariusz Wolski
2023	Oppenheimer	Hoyte van Hoytema
2023	Saltburn	Linus Sandgren
2024	Dune: Part Two	Greig Fraser
2024	The Brutalist	Lol Crawley
2024	Gladiator II	John Mathieson
2024	Maria	Edward Lachman
2024	Nickel Boys	Jomo Fray
2024	Nosferatu	Jarin Blaschke
2025	Train Dreams	Adolpho Veloso
2025	Sinners	Autumn Durald Arkapaw
2025	F1	Claudio Miranda
2025	Frankenstein	Dan Laustsen
2025	Hamnet	Łukasz Żal
2025	One Battle After Another	Michael Bauman
