= Aaron Guzikowski =

American screenwriter

- Occupation: Screenwriter
- Notable work: Prisoners; The Red Road; Raised by Wolves

Aaron Guzikowski is an American screenwriter. He is best known for writing the 2013 film Prisoners and creating the 2014 television series The Red Road. In 2020, he created the HBO Max series Raised by Wolves.

== Career ==
Guzikowski was raised in Brockton, Massachusetts. He was interested in visual arts as a child and completed a Master of Fine Arts with a major in film. He was unable to find any work in New York City after graduation but began writing spec scripts in his spare time while working other jobs with the help of a manager in Los Angeles.

He conceived Prisoners in 2007 and completed a final draft in 2009. The script won several competitions and featured in The Black List, a survey of the most popular unproduced screenplays in circulation in Hollywood. After it was sold to Alcon Entertainment, the project languished in development hell for a number of years with interest from Bryan Singer, Christian Bale, and Leonardo DiCaprio at various stages. The film was ultimately realized in 2013, directed by Denis Villeneuve and starring Hugh Jackman and Jake Gyllenhaal.

His next project was an adaptation of the 2008 Icelandic film Reykjavík-Rotterdam titled Contraband. He was hired by actor Mark Wahlberg, who had once been attached to star in Prisoners. Although the script was written after Prisoners, it was released a year earlier in 2012.

He was approached by television producer Sarah Condon with an idea for a television series about the Ramapough Mountain Indians, resulting in The Red Road for SundanceTV in 2014. The series ended after its second season in 2015.

Guzikowski initially co-wrote Seventh Son for Warner Bros.; the project ended up at Universal, without credit for his work. In November 2014, Universal hired him to write a reboot of The Wolf Man. In December 2015, he was in negotiations for a Friday the 13th reboot at Paramount Pictures which was ultimately cancelled.

He is the creator and primary screenwriter of Raised by Wolves, released in September 2020 on HBO Max as part of an overall deal with the network. In September 2025 it was announced that he will be the screenplay writer for the upcoming animated film Death Stranding Mosquito (Working Title)

== Personal life ==
Guzikowski is of Polish descent — his great-grandmother was from Poland. He moved to Los Angeles after selling his first script in 2009, and is married with three children. He was raised Catholic but is no longer practicing, although, he states "I often make connections to Catholic iconography or Bible stories".

== Filmography ==
Film

Year	Title	Writer	Producer	Director	Notes
2012	Contraband	Yes	No	No	
2013	Prisoners	Yes	No	No	
2017	Papillon	Yes	No	No	
TBA	Death Stranding Mosquito (Working Title)	Yes	No	No	
TBA	Untitled Alien Prequel	Yes			

Television

Year	Title	Writer	Producer	Creator	Notes
2014–2015	The Red Road	Yes	Yes	Yes	Wrote 8 episodes
2020–2022	Raised by Wolves	Yes	Yes	Yes	Wrote 12 episodes
