= Dariusz Wolski =

Polish cinematographer (born 1956)

- Wolski in 2025
- Born: 7 May 1956 (age 70); Warsaw, Poland
- Education: Łódź Film School
- Years active: 1981–present
- Organization: American Society of Cinematographers

Dariusz Adam Wolski (born 7 May 1956) is a Polish cinematographer, best known for his work on the Pirates of the Caribbean film series and for his collaboration with director Ridley Scott.

== Life and education ==
Wolski was born Warsaw, Poland, and attended film school in Łódź.

== Career ==
Wolski moved to the United States in 1979, at age of 23. Soon after, he began working as a camera assistant on low-budget films in New York City and Los Angeles, which eventually led him to work as a cinematographer on major Hollywood productions.

Some of his biggest productions include The Crow (1994), Dark City (1998), The Mexican (2001), Pirates of the Caribbean: The Curse of the Black Pearl (2003), Dead Man's Chest (2006), At World's End (2007), Sweeney Todd: The Demon Barber of Fleet Street (2007), Alice in Wonderland (2007), Prometheus (2012), The Martian (2015), The Walk (2015), Alien: Covenant (2017), All the Money in the World (2017), Sicario: Day of the Soldado (2018), News of the World (2020), The Last Duel (2021), Napoleon (2023), Fly Me to the Moon (2024), Nuremberg (2025) and Resident Evil (2026).

He has been a member of the American Society of Cinematographers since 1996 and a member of the Academy of Motion Picture Arts and Sciences since 2004.

== Filmography ==
=== Film ===
Year	Title	Director	Notes
1988	Nightfall	Paul Mayersberg	
1993	Romeo Is Bleeding	Peter Medak	
1994	The Crow	Alex Proyas	
1995	Crimson Tide	Tony Scott	
1996	The Fan	Tony Scott	
1998	A Perfect Murder	Andrew Davis	
1998	Dark City	Alex Proyas	
2001	The Mexican	Gore Verbinski	
2002	Bad Company	Joel Schumacher	
2003	Pirates of the Caribbean: The Curse of the Black Pearl	Gore Verbinski	
2005	Hide and Seek	John Polson	
2006	Pirates of the Caribbean: Dead Man's Chest	Gore Verbinski	Shot back-to-back
2007	Pirates of the Caribbean: At World's End	Gore Verbinski	Shot back-to-back
2007	Sweeney Todd: The Demon Barber of Fleet Street	Tim Burton	
2008	Eagle Eye	D. J. Caruso	
2010	Alice in Wonderland	Tim Burton	
2011	Pirates of the Caribbean: On Stranger Tides	Rob Marshall	
2011	The Rum Diary	Bruce Robinson	
2012	Prometheus	Ridley Scott	
2013	The Counselor	Ridley Scott	
2014	Exodus: Gods and Kings	Ridley Scott	
2015	The Martian	Ridley Scott	
2015	The Walk	Robert Zemeckis	
2017	Alien: Covenant	Ridley Scott	
2017	All the Money in the World	Ridley Scott	
2017	War Machine	David Michôd	
2018	Sicario: Day of the Soldado	Stefano Sollima	
2020	News of the World	Paul Greengrass	
2021	The Last Duel	Ridley Scott	
2021	House of Gucci	Ridley Scott	
2023	Napoleon	Ridley Scott	
2024	Fly Me to the Moon	Greg Berlanti	Also acted in the role of "Edvardo"
2024	Modì, Three Days on the Wing of Madness	Johnny Depp	With Nicola Pecorini
2025	Nuremberg	James Vanderbilt	
2026	Resident Evil	Zach Cregger	
2027	Liminal †	Louis Leterrier	Post-production

Key
†	Denotes films that have not yet been released

=== Television ===
Year	Title	Director	Notes
1989	American Playhouse	Evelyn Purcell	Episode "Land of Little Rain"
1989	Kenny, Dolly and Willie: Something Inside So Strong	Tom Trbovich	TV special
1991	Chains of Gold	Rod Holcomb	TV movie; Co-cinematographer with Bruce Surtees
1992	Fifteenth Phase of the Moon	Mark Amos Nealey	TV short
2020	Raised by Wolves	Ridley Scott	Episodes "Raised by Wolves" and "Pentagram"

== Awards and nominations ==
Year	Title	Award/Nomination
1995	Crimson Tide	Nominated – ASC Award for Best Cinematography
2007	Sweeney Todd: The Demon Barber of Fleet Street	Nominated – Houston Film Critics Society Award for Best Cinematography
2015	The Martian	Nominated – Houston Film Critics Society Award for Best Cinematography; Nominated – San Diego Film Critics Society Award for Best Cinematography; Nominated – Satellite Award for Best Cinematography
2015	The Walk	Nominated – Visual Effects Society Award for Outstanding Virtual Cinematography
2020	News of the World	Nominated – Academy Award for Best Cinematography; Nominated – ASC Award for Best Cinematography; Nominated – BAFTA Award for Best Cinematography
