= List of accolades received by Ida =

Ida (pronounced [ˈida]) is a 2013 Polish drama film directed by Paweł Pawlikowski and written by Pawlikowski and Rebecca Lenkiewicz. Set in Poland in 1962, it is about a young woman on the verge of taking vows as a Catholic nun. Orphaned as an infant during the German occupation of World War II, she must now meet her aunt. The former Communist state prosecutor and only surviving relative tells her that her parents were Jewish. The two women embark on a road trip into the Polish countryside to learn the fate of their family.

The following is a list of awards received by Ida:

== Industry awards ==
Award		Date of ceremony	Category	Recipients	Result	Lost to	Refs
28th American Society of Cinematographers Awards	award ceremony in Los Angeles	1 February 2014	Spotlight Award	Ida	Won	N/A	
2nd Polish Society of Cinematographers Awards		3 March 2014	PSC Award	Ryszard Lenczewski, Łukasz Żal	Won	N/A	
16th Polish Academy Film Awards	award ceremony in Warsaw	10 March 2014	Best Film	Ida	Won	N/A	
16th Polish Academy Film Awards	award ceremony in Warsaw	10 March 2014	Best Director	Paweł Pawlikowski	Won	N/A	
16th Polish Academy Film Awards	award ceremony in Warsaw	10 March 2014	Best Actress	Agata Kulesza	Won	N/A	
16th Polish Academy Film Awards	award ceremony in Warsaw	10 March 2014	Best Editing	Jarosław Kamiński	Won	N/A	
16th Polish Academy Film Awards	award ceremony in Warsaw	10 March 2014	Audience Award	Ida	Nominated	Life Feels Good	
16th Polish Academy Film Awards	award ceremony in Warsaw	10 March 2014	Best Screenplay	Paweł Pawlikowski, Rebecca Lenkiewicz	Nominated	Maciej Pieprzyca; Life Feels Good	
16th Polish Academy Film Awards	award ceremony in Warsaw	10 March 2014	Discovery of the Year	Agata Trzebuchowska	Nominated	Bodo Kox; The Girl from the Wardrobe	
16th Polish Academy Film Awards	award ceremony in Warsaw	10 March 2014	Discovery of the Year	Łukasz Żal	Nominated	Bodo Kox; The Girl from the Wardrobe	
16th Polish Academy Film Awards	award ceremony in Warsaw	10 March 2014	Best Cinematography	Ryszard Lenczewski, Łukasz Żal	Nominated	Krzysztof Ptak, Wojciech Staroń; Papusza	
16th Polish Academy Film Awards	award ceremony in Warsaw	10 March 2014	Best Costume Design	Aleksandra Staszko	Nominated	Barbara Sikorska-Bouffał; Papusza	
16th Polish Academy Film Awards	award ceremony in Warsaw	10 March 2014	Best Production Design	Katarzyna Sobańska, Marcel Sławiński	Nominated	Anna Wunderlich; Papusza	
15th Golden Trailer Awards		20 May 2014	Best Foreign Drama	Ida	Won	N/A	
59th David di Donatello Academy of Italian Cinema Award	award ceremony in Rome	10 June 2014	Best European Film	Ida	Nominated	Philomena	
17th British Independent Film Awards (BIFAs)	award ceremony in London	7 December 2014	Best International Independent Film	Ida	Nominated	Boyhood	
27th European Film Awards	press conference in Riga	16 September 2014	the 50 films on 2014's selection list (the list of films recommended for a nomination for the Awards)	Ida	Selection	N/A	
27th European Film Awards	Seville European Film Festival	8 November 2014	official nomination list	Ida	Official nomination	N/A	
27th European Film Awards	award ceremony in Riga	13 December 2014	Best Film	Ida	Won	N/A	
27th European Film Awards	award ceremony in Riga	13 December 2014	People's Choice Award for Best European Film	Ida	Won	N/A	
27th European Film Awards	award ceremony in Riga	13 December 2014	Best Director	Paweł Pawlikowski	Won	N/A	
27th European Film Awards	award ceremony in Riga	13 December 2014	Best Screenwriter	Paweł Pawlikowski, Rebecca Lenkiewicz	Won	N/A	
27th European Film Awards	award ceremony in Riga	13 December 2014	Best Cinematographer (Prix Carlo di Palma)	Ryszard Lenczewski, Łukasz Żal	Won	N/A	
27th European Film Awards	award ceremony in Riga	13 December 2014	Best Actress	Agata Kulesza	Nominated	Marion Cotillard; Two Days, One Night	
27th European Film Awards	award ceremony in Riga	13 December 2014	Best Actress	Agata Trzebuchowska	Nominated	Marion Cotillard; Two Days, One Night	
2014 European Parliament LUX Prize	49th Karlovy Vary International Film Festival	6 July 2014	official selection of LUX Prize 10 movies	Ida	Selection	N/A	
2014 European Parliament LUX Prize	71st Venice International Film Festival	27 August 2014	official nomination of 3 LUX Prize movies announcement, special presentation in section Giornate degli Autori	Ida	Official nomination	N/A	
2014 European Parliament LUX Prize	55th Thessaloniki International Film Festival	5 November 2014	special screening	Ida	Appearance	N/A	
2014 European Parliament LUX Prize	the formal sitting of the European Parliament in Strasbourg	17 December 2014	European Parliament Award	Ida	Won	N/A	
72nd Golden Globe Awards	award ceremony in Los Angeles	11 January 2015	Best Foreign Language Film	Ida	Nominated	Leviathan	
20th Critics' Choice Awards	award ceremony in Los Angeles	15 January 2015	Best Foreign Language Film	Ida	Nominated	Force Majeure	
50th Guldbagge Awards	award ceremony in Stockholm	January 26, 2015	Best Foreign Film	Ida	Nominated	Two Days, One Night	
7th Gaudí Awards	award ceremony in Barcelona	1 February 2015	Best European Film	Ida	Nominated	The Great Beauty	
31st Robert Awards	award ceremony in Copenhagen	1 February 2015	Non-American Film of the Year	Ida	Nominated	Force Majeure	
29th Goya Awards	award ceremony in Madrid	7 February 2015	Best European Film	Ida	Won	N/A	
68th British Academy Film Awards	award ceremony in London	8 February 2015	Best Film Not in the English Language	Ida	Won	N/A	
68th British Academy Film Awards	award ceremony in London	8 February 2015	Best Cinematography	Ryszard Lenczewski, Łukasz Żal	Nominated	Emmanuel Lubezki; Birdman	
19th Satellite Awards		15 February 2015	Best Foreign Language Film	Ida	Nominated	Tangerines	
40th César Awards	award ceremony in Paris	20 February 2015	Best Foreign Film	Ida	Nominated	Mommy	
30th Independent Spirit Awards	award ceremony in Los Angeles	21 February 2015	Best International Film	Ida	Won	N/A	
87th Academy Awards	Ministry of Culture and National Heritage of the Republic of Poland Press Conference in Warsaw	8 August 2013	Polish submissions for Best Foreign Language Film	Ida	Submission	N/A	
87th Academy Awards	Press Conference in Los Angeles	19 December 2014	official shortlist for Best Foreign Language Film	Ida	Shortlist	N/A	
87th Academy Awards	Press Conference in Los Angeles	15 January 2015	official nomination for Best Foreign Language Film	Ida	Official nomination	N/A	
87th Academy Awards	award ceremony in Los Angeles	22 February 2015	Best Foreign Language Film	Ida	Won	N/A	
87th Academy Awards	award ceremony in Los Angeles	22 February 2015	Best Cinematography	Łukasz Żal, Ryszard Lenczewski	Nominated	Emmanuel Lubezki; Birdman or (The Unexpected Virtue of Ignorance)	

== International film festivals awards ==
Award	Country/State	Date of ceremony	Category	Recipients	Result	Lost to	Refs
38th Toronto International Film Festival	Ontario, CA	15 September 2013	Prize of the International Critics (FIPRESCI) in Special Presentations section	Ida	Won	N/A	
29th Warsaw International Film Festival	Poland, EU	19 October 2013	Warsaw Grand Prix in the International Competition	Ida	Won	N/A	
29th Warsaw International Film Festival	Poland, EU	19 October 2013	Prize of the Ecumenical Jury	Ida	Won	N/A	
57th BFI London Film Festival	United Kingdom	19 October 2013	Grand Prix as Best Film	Ida	Won	N/A	
20th Minsk International Film Festival Listapad	Belarus	18 November 2013	Golden Listapad Grand Prix Award for Best Feature Film	Ida	Won	N/A	
20th Minsk International Film Festival Listapad	Belarus	18 November 2013	Yury Marukhin Memorial Award for Best Photography	Ryszard Lenczewski, Łukasz Żal	Won	N/A	
20th Minsk International Film Festival Listapad	Belarus	18 November 2013	Best Actress in a Supporting Role	Agata Kulesza	Won	N/A	
20th Minsk International Film Festival Listapad	Belarus	18 November 2013	International Film Critics Jury Award; Silver Listapad (Art as Phenomenon)	Ida	Won	N/A	
51st Gijón International Film Festival	Spain, EU	23 November 2013	Premio Principado de Asturias for Best Film	Ida	Won	N/A	
51st Gijón International Film Festival	Spain, EU	23 November 2013	Gil Parrondo Prize for Best Art Direction	Katarzyna Sobańska, Marcel Sławiński	Won	N/A	
51st Gijón International Film Festival	Spain, EU	23 November 2013	Best Actress Prize	Agata Kulesza	Won	N/A	
51st Gijón International Film Festival	Spain, EU	23 November 2013	Best Screenplay Prize	Paweł Pawlikowski, Rebecca Lenkiewicz	Won	N/A	
51st Gijón International Film Festival	Spain, EU	23 November 2013	Young Jury Award	Ida	Won	N/A	
13th Marrakech International Film Festival	Morocco	7 December 2013	Golden Starn (Grand Prix)	Ida	Nominated	Han Gong-ju	
19th Tromsø International Film Festival	Norway	15 January 2014	FIPRESCI Award	Ida	Won	N/A	
11th Jameson Dublin International Film Festival	Ireland, EU	23 February 2014	Critics Award for Best Direction	Paweł Pawlikowski	Won	N/A	
19th Vilnius International Film Festival	Lithuania, EU	4 April 2014	Best Director in Baltic Gaze Section	Paweł Pawlikowski	Won	N/A	
14th Sarasota Film Festival	Florida, US	13 April 2014	Jury Prize in Narrative Feature Competition	Ida	Won	N/A	
46th Nashville Film Festival	Tennessee, US	27 April 2014	Lipscomb Ecumenical Prize	Ida	Won	N/A	
30th Seattle International Film Festival	Washington, US	15 May 2014	Best Director	Paweł Pawlikowski	3rd runner-up	Richard Linklater; Boyhood	
30th Seattle International Film Festival	Washington, US	15 May 2014	Best Actress	Agata Kulesza	2nd runner-up	Patricia Arquette; Boyhood	
5th Avvantura Film Forum Zadar	Croatia, EU	29 August 2014	Grand Prix	Ida	Won	N/A	
5th Avvantura Film Forum Zadar	Croatia, EU	29 August 2014	Best Actress Prize	Agata Kulesza, Agata Trzebuchowska	Won	N/A	
27th Helsinki International Film Festival 2014 Love & Anarchy	Finland, EU	27 September 2014	Audience Award	Ida	Won	N/A	
30th Haifa International Film Festival	Israel	18 October 2014	The Filmmakers of Tomorrow (Fedeora Competition)	Ida	Nominated	N/A	
4th UK Film Festival	United Kingdom	21 November 2014	Best Feature Film	Ida	Won	N/A	
20th Capri Hollywood International Film Festival	Italy, EU	4 January 2015	Capri Best Foreign Language Award	Ida	Won	N/A	

== Specialised film festivals awards ==
Award	City, Country	Date of ceremony	Category	Recipients	Result	Lost to	Refs
21st International Film Festival of the Art of Cinematography Camerimage	Bydgoszcz, Poland	23 November 2013	Golden Frog for the Best Cinematography	Ryszard Lenczewski, Łukasz Żal	Won	N/A	
35th Manaki Brothers International Cinematographers Film Festival	Bitola, Macedonia	19 September 2014	Silver Camera	Ryszard Lenczewski, Łukasz Żal	Won	N/A	

== Regionalised film festivals awards ==
=== European film festivals awards ===
Award		Date of ceremony	Category	Recipients	Result	Lost to	Refs
5th Les Arcs Film Festival	Les Arcs, France	21 December 2013	Cineuropa Award - Crystal Arrow	Ida	Won	N/A	
5th Les Arcs Film Festival	Les Arcs, France	21 December 2013	Best Actress Prize	Agata Kulesza, Agata Trzebuchowska	Won	N/A	
17th European Union Film Festival	Chicago, United States	3 April 2014	Audience Award	Ida	Nominated	N/A	
14th Festival of Central and Eastern European Film (GoEast)	Wiesbaden, Germany	15 April 2014	Škoda Film Award for Best Film	Ida	Won	N/A	
5th Eastern and Central European Films Festival Al Este de Lima	Lima, Peru	15 May 2014	Best Feature	Ida	Won	N/A	
4th Mediaş Central European Film Festival	Mediaş, Romania	6 September 2014	Best Cinematography Award	Ryszard Lenczewski, Łukasz Żal	Won	N/A	

=== Polish film festivals awards ===
Award		Date of ceremony	Category	Recipients	Result	Lost to	Refs
38th National Polish Film Festival	Gdynia, Poland	14 September 2013	Golden Lions for Best Film	Ida	Won	N/A	
38th National Polish Film Festival	Gdynia, Poland	14 September 2013	Best Producer	Ewa Puszczyńska, Piotr Dzięcioł	Won	N/A	
38th National Polish Film Festival	Gdynia, Poland	14 September 2013	Best Actress	Agata Kulesza	Won	N/A	
38th National Polish Film Festival	Gdynia, Poland	14 September 2013	Best Cinematography	Ryszard Lenczewski, Łukasz Żal	Won	N/A	
38th National Polish Film Festival	Gdynia, Poland	14 September 2013	Best Production Design	Katarzyna Sobańska, Marcel Sławiński	Won	N/A	
38th National Polish Film Festival	Gdynia, Poland	14 September 2013	Journalist Award	Ida	Won	N/A	
38th National Polish Film Festival	Gdynia, Poland	14 September 2013	Rising Elle Star Award	Agata Trzebuchowska	Won	N/A	
38th National Polish Film Festival	Gdynia, Poland	14 September 2013	Ciné Club Society Don Quixote Award	Ida	Won	N/A	
38th National Polish Film Festival	Gdynia, Poland	14 September 2013	Award of the Arthouse Cinema Network	Ida	Won	N/A	
38th National Polish Film Festival	Gdynia, Poland	14 September 2013	Special Sponson Recognition - Apart Award	Agata Trzebuchowska	Won	N/A	
2nd Tadeusz Szymków Film Acting Festival (FAF)	Wrocław, Poland	24 October 2013	Best Actress	Agata Trzebuchowska	Nominated	Julia Kijowska; Loving	
2nd Tadeusz Szymków Film Acting Festival (FAF)	Wrocław, Poland	24 October 2013	Best Supporting Actress	Agata Kulesza	Nominated	Marta Nieradkiewicz; Floating Skyscrapers	
11th Tofifest International Film Festival	Toruń, Poland	27 October 2013	Golden Angel in From Poland film competition	Ida	Nominated	Life Feels Good	
21st Nationwide Festival of the Film Art Prowincjonalia	Września, Poland	8 February 2014	Jańcio Wodnik Award for Best Actress	Agata Kulesza, Agata Trzebuchowska	Won	N/A	
28th Tarnów Film Award	Tarnów, Poland	4 May 2014	Special Jury Award	Ida	Won	N/A	
11th International Festival of Independent Cinema Off Plus Camera	Kraków, Poland	11 May 2014	Polish Film Nobel Prize	Ida	Won	N/A	
6th Wisła Polish Film Festival in Moscow	Moscow, Russia	22 May 2014	Elephant Award for Best Film	Ida	Nominated	Women's Day	
43rd Lubuskie Summer of Films	Łagów, Poland	6 July 2014	Silver Raceme (2nd Award for Best Film)	Ida	Won	N/A	
15th Polish Film Festival in Los Angeles	Los Angeles, United States	16 October 2014	Hollywood Eagle Award for Best Feature Film	Ida	Won	N/A	
2nd Polish Film Festival CiakPolska	Rome, Italy	9 November 2014	Audience Award	Ida	Won	N/A	
6th Toronto Polish Film Festival	Toronto, Canada	9 November 2014	Best Feature Film	Ida	Nominated	N/A	
26th Polish Film Festival in America	Chicago, United States	23 November 2014	Golden Teeth Award for Best Feature	Ida	Nominated	Gods	

- 2013: Warsaw Jewish Film Festival, awards for the best full feature film, for the best actress (Agata Kulesza), for the best shots

== Thematic film festival awards ==
Award	Date of ceremony	Category	Recipients	Result	Lost to	Refs
11th Warsaw Jewish Film Festival	31 October 2013	David's Camera for Best Feature Film	Ida	Won	N/A	
11th Warsaw Jewish Film Festival	31 October 2013	Best Actress	Agata Kulesza	Won	N/A	
11th Warsaw Jewish Film Festival	31 October 2013	Best Cinematographer	Ryszard Lenczewski, Łukasz Żal	Won	N/A	

== Film Critics Society Awards ==
Award	Date of ceremony	Category	Recipients	Result	Lost to	Refs
58th Golder Reels Awards	28 January 2014	Best Polish Film of 2013	Ida	Honorable Mention	Imagine	
80th New York Film Critics Circle Awards	1 December 2014	Best Foreign Language Film	Ida	Won	N/A	
40th Los Angeles Film Critics Association Awards	7 December 2014	Best Foreign Language Film	Ida	Won	N/A	
40th Los Angeles Film Critics Association Awards	7 December 2014	Best Supporting Actress	Agata Kulesza	Won	N/A	
35th Boston Society of Film Critics Awards	7 December 2014	Best Foreign Language Film	Ida	Runner-up	Two Days, One Night	
13th Washington D.C. Area Film Critics Association Awards	8 December 2014	Best Foreign Language Film	Ida	Nominated	Force Majeure	
49th Kansas City Film Critics Circle Awards	14 December 2014	Best Foreign Language Film	Ida	Won	N/A	
13th San Francisco Film Critics Circle Awards	14 December 2014	Best Foreign Language Film	Ida	Won	N/A	
13th San Francisco Film Critics Circle Awards	14 December 2014	Best Cinematography	Ryszard Lenczewski, Łukasz Żal	Won	N/A	
13th San Francisco Film Critics Circle Awards	14 December 2014	Best Supporting Actress	Agata Kulesza	Nominated	Patricia Arquette; Boyhood	
18th Online Film Critics Society Awards	15 December 2014	Best Picture	Ida	Nominated	The Grand Budapest Hotel	
18th Online Film Critics Society Awards	15 December 2014	Best Film Not in the English Language	Ida	Nominated	Two Days, One Night	
18th Online Film Critics Society Awards	15 December 2014	Best Supporting Actress	Agata Kulesza	Nominated	Patricia Arquette; Boyhood	
18th Online Film Critics Society Awards	15 December 2014	Best Cinematography	Ryszard Lenczewski, Łukasz Żal	Nominated	Robert Yeoman; The Grand Budapest Hotel	
19th San Diego Film Critics Society Award	15 December 2014	Best Foreign Language Film	Ida	Nominated	Force Majeure	
21st Dallas–Fort Worth Film Critics Association Awards	15 December 2014	Best Foreign Language Film	Ida	2nd place	Force Majeure	
27th Chicago Film Critics Association Awards	15 December 2014	Best Foreign Language Film	Ida	Nominated	Force Majeure	
27th Chicago Film Critics Association Awards	15 December 2014	Best Cinematography	Ryszard Lenczewski, Łukasz Żal	Nominated	Emmanuel Lubezki; Birdman and Robert Yeoman; The Grand Budapest Hotel	
27th Chicago Film Critics Association Awards	15 December 2014	Best Supporting Actress	Agata Kulesza	Nominated	Patricia Arquette; Boyhood	
27th Chicago Film Critics Association Awards	15 December 2014	Most Promising Performer	Agata Trzebuchowska	Nominated	Jack O'Connell; Starred Up and Unbroken	
18th Toronto Film Critics Association Awards	15 December 2014	Best Foreign Language Film	Ida	Nominated	Force Majeure	
19th St. Louis Gateway Film Critics Association	15 December 2014	Best Foreign Language Film	Ida	#3	Force Majeure	
15th Phoenix Film Critics Society Awards	16 December 2014	Best Foreign Language Film	Ida	Won	N/A	
11th Women Film Critics Circle Awards	16 December 2014	Best Foreign Film By or About Women	Ida	Nominated	Two Days, One Night	
11th Women Film Critics Circle Awards	16 December 2014	Best Woman Storyteller (Screenwriting Award)	Rebecca Lenkiewicz	Won	N/A	
9th Dublin Film Critics' Circle Awards	17 December 2014	Top 10 Films	Ida	#3	Boyhood	
9th Dublin Film Critics' Circle Awards	17 December 2014	Best Director	Paweł Pawlikowski	#3	Richard Linklater; Boyhood	
9th Dublin Film Critics' Circle Awards	17 December 2014	Best Actress	Agata Kulesza	#8	Marion Cotillard; Two Days, One Night	
9th Dublin Film Critics' Circle Awards	17 December 2014	Best Actress	Agata Trzebuchowska	#9	Marion Cotillard; Two Days, One Night	
18th Las Vegas Film Critics Society Awards	18 December 2014	Best Foreign Language Film	Ida	Won	N/A	
19th Florida Film Critics Circle Awards	19 December 2014	Best Foreign Language Film	Ida	Nominated	The Raid 2	
21st Southeastern Film Critics Association Awards	22 December 2014	Best Foreign Language Film	Ida	Runner-up	Force Majeure	
Indiewire 2014 Year-End Critics Pol	31 December 2014	Best Film	Ida	#7	Boyhood	
Indiewire 2014 Year-End Critics Pol	31 December 2014	Highest Rated Film Not In English Language	Ida	#2	Goodbye to Language	
Indiewire 2014 Year-End Critics Pol	31 December 2014	Best Director	Paweł Pawlikowski	#10	Richard Linklater; Boyhood	
Indiewire 2014 Year-End Critics Pol	31 December 2014	Best Lead Actress	Agata Trzebuchowska	#12	Marion Cotillard; Two Days, One Night	
Indiewire 2014 Year-End Critics Pol	31 December 2014	Best Lead Actress	Agata Kulesza	#19	Marion Cotillard; Two Days, One Night	
Indiewire 2014 Year-End Critics Pol	31 December 2014	Best Supporting Actress	Agata Kulesza	#5	Patricia Arquette; Boyhood	
Indiewire 2014 Year-End Critics Pol	31 December 2014	Best Supporting Actress	Agata Trzebuchowska	#45	Patricia Arquette; Boyhood	
Indiewire 2014 Year-End Critics Pol	31 December 2014	Best Screenplay	Paweł Pawlikowski, Rebecca Lenkiewicz	#17	Wes Anderson; The Grand Budapest Hotel	
Indiewire 2014 Year-End Critics Pol	31 December 2014	Best Cinematography	Ryszard Lenczewski, Łukasz Żal	#6	Emmanuel Lubezki; Birdman	
Indiewire 2014 Year-End Critics Pol	31 December 2014	Best Editing	Jarosław Kamiński	#26	Sandra Adair; Boyhood	
49th National Society of Film Critics Awards	3 January 2015	Best Supporting Actress	Agata Kulesza	Runner-up	Patricia Arquette; Boyhood	
10th North Texas Film Critics Association Awards	4 January 2015	Best Foreign Language Film	Ida	Won	N/A	
14th Vancouver Film Critics Circle Awards	5 January 2015	Best Foreign Language Film	Ida	Nominated	Force Majeure	
Metacritic Best and Worst Movies of 2014	6 January 2015	2014's Best-Reviewed Foreign-Language Films (Narrative Films Only)	Ida	#3	Leviathan	
8th Houston Film Critics Society Awards	10 January 2015	Best Foreign Language Film	Ida	Nominated	Force Majeure	
8th Alliance of Women Film Journalists EDA Awards	12 January 2015	Best Foreign Language Film	Ida	Won	N/A	
7th Denver Film Critics Society Awards	12 January 2015	Best Foreign Language Film	Ida	Nominated	Two Days, One Night	
35th London Film Critics Circle Awards	18 January 2015	Foreign Language Film of the Year	Ida	Nominated	Leviathan	
35th London Film Critics Circle Awards	18 January 2015	Supporting Actress of the Year	Agata Kulesza	Nominated	Patricia Arquette; Boyhood	
6th Gay and Lesbian Entertainment Critics Association Dorian Awards	20 January 2015	Foreign Language Film Film of the Year	Ida	Nominated	Mommy	
70th CEC Medals	2 February 2015	Best Foreign Film	Ida	Nominated	Nebraska	
68th Denmark's National Association of Film Critics Bodil Awards	28 February 2015	Best Non-American Film	Ida	Nominated	Force Majeure	
73rd Argentine Film Critics Association	22 June 2015	Silver Condor Award for Best Foreign Film	Ida	Won	N/A	

== Other awards ==
Award	Date of ceremony	Category	Recipients	Result	Lost to	Refs
20th Polityka Magazine Passport	14 January 2014	Film Award (for his contribution in various films in 2013, incl. Ida)	Dawid Ogrodnik	Won	N/A	
20th Polityka Magazine Passport	14 January 2014	Film Award (for her contribution in various films in 2013, incl. Ida)	Agata Kulesza	Nominated	Dawid Ogrodnik	
9th TVP Kultura Guarantee of Culture Award	11 April 2014	Award in Film Category for Direction and Actress Duo	Paweł Pawlikowski, Agata Kulesza, Agata Trzebuchowska	Nominated	Joanna Kos-Krauze, Krzysztof Krauze for Direction and Zbigniew Waleryś for Actor in Papusza	
Ministry of Culture and National Heritage of the Republic of Poland	2 August 2014	Annual Prize	Paweł Pawlikowski	Won	N/A	
2014 Ecumenical Jury Awards	22 December 2014	List of 10 film chosen by Ecumenical Jury	Ida	#2	Two Days, One Night	
10 New Academy Awards Categories We'd Like to See!	15 January 2015	The Hipster Award	Ida	Nominated	Under the Skin	

== Rankings and Year-End Lists ==
Ranking		Date of announcement	Category	Result	Lost to	Refs
W Nas		23 December 2013	Łukasz Adamski's Best Film Of 2013	#6	Gravity	
W Nas		31 December 2013	Łukasz Adamski's Top 5 Best Polish Films Of 2013	#1	N/A	
Onet		27 December 2013	Critics' Choice Best Film Of 2013	#11	Django Unchained	
Stopklatka		27 December 2013	Krzysztof Spór's Top 11 Best Polish Films Of 2013	No order	N/A	
Stopklatka		30 December 2013	Esensja Top 50 Best Films of 2013	#25	Django Unchained	
Wirtualna Polska		1 January 2014	Peoples' Choice Best Polish Film Of 2013	#7	Traffic Department	
Gildia		3 January 2014	Top 5 Best Polish Drama Films Of 2013	#2	Life Feels Good	
Ekran		31 December 2013	Best Polish Films Of 2013	#3	Traffic Department	
Ekran		24 February 2014	Top 10 Best Films Of 2013 by Tadeusz Lubelski	#2	Burning Bush	
Ekran		24 February 2014	Top 10 Best Films Of 2013 by Rafał Syska	#7	The Great Beauty	
Ekran		24 February 2014	Top 10 Best Films Of 2013 by Adam Grabicz	#5	Nymphomaniac	
Ekran		24 February 2014	Top 10 Best Films Of 2013 by Maciej Pelplinski	#10	The Great Beauty	
Ekran		17 March 2014	Top 10 Best Films Of 2013 by Marta Maciejewska	#5	Zero Dark Thirty	
Ekran		17 March 2014	Top 10 Best Films Of 2013 by Rafał Pawłowski	#10	A Touch of Sin	
Polski Portal Kultury		28 February 2014	Marcin Adamczak's Best Films Of 2013	#6	Blue Is the Warmest Colour	
Indiewire	Criticwire Network	22 October 2014	The Top-Rated Foreign-Language Films of 2014	#1; Average Criticwire Rating: A	N/A	
Indiewire	The Playlist	28 December 2014	Nikola Grozdanovic's Top 20 Films Of 2014	#4	Leviathan	
Indiewire	Thompson on Hollywood!	30 December 2014	TOH!'s Top 10 Films of 2014	#4	Under the Skin	
Indiewire		8 December 2014	The Best Films of 2014 According to Eric Kohn	#6	Boyhood	
Indiewire	The Playlist	9 December 2014	The 20 Best Films Of 2014 By The Playlist Staff	#17	Under the Skin	
Little White Lies		2 December 2014	25 Best Films Of 2014 by David Ehrlich	#13	The Grand Budapest Hotel	
The Guardian		3 December 2014	The best films of 2014 – Critics' Choice	#8	Under the Skin	
The Guardian		12 December 2014	Peter Bradshaw's Top 10s of 2014	No order	N/A	
The Guardian		16 December 2014	The best films of 2014 – Readers' Choice	#8	Boyhood	
British Film Institute		3 December 2014	Readers’ Film Choice 2014	#3	Under the Skin	
Vanity Fair		8 December 2014	Richard Lawson's The 10 Best Movies of 2014	Best of the Rest	Love Is Strange	
The Popcorn Reel		9 December 2014	Omar P.L Moore's The 10 Best Films of 2014	#2	The Grand Budapest Hotel	
Out		9 December 2014	Out's Top 10 Best Films of 2014	Honorable Mention	Dear White People	
Fandor		10 December 2014	Keyframe Critics' Top 25 Feature Films of 2014	#5	Boyhood	
The New York Times		11 December 2014	A. O. Scott's Top 10 Movies 2014	#2	Boyhood	
The New York Times		11 December 2014	Stephen Holden's Best Movies 2014	No order	N/A	
The New Yorker		11 December 2014	Richard Brody's The Best Movies of 2014	The Negative Ten	The Grand Budapest Hotel	
The New Yorker		13 December 2014	David Denby's Top 10 Films Of 2014	#1	N/A	
Film Comment		12 December 2014	Best Films of 2014	#4	Boyhood	
Slate		14 December 2014	Dana Stevens' The Top 10 Movies of 2014	No order	N/A	
The Philadelphia Inquirer		19 December 2014	Steven Rea's 10 Best Films of 2014	#2-10	Birdman	
Time Out London		15 December 2014	The 20 best films of 2014	#9	12 Years a Slave	
The Huffington Post		15 December 2014	Matthew Jacobs & Christopher Rosen's 22 Best Movies Of 2014	mention	Selma	
BuzzFeed		17 December 2014	Alison Willmore's The 14 Greatest Movies Of 2014	#9	Under the Skin	
RogerEbert.com		17 December 2014	The 10 Best Films of 2014	#5	Under the Skin	
Variety		17 December 2014	Scott Foundas’ Top 10 Films of 2014	#11-20	Goodbye to Language	
The Christian Science Monitor		17 December 2014	The Best 10 Movies of the Year by Peter Rainer	Mention	Foxcatcher	
Grantland		18 December 2014	Wesley Moris' The Top 10 Movies of 2014	20 more that easily could be one of the 10	Norte, the End of History	
The A.V. Club		18 December 2014	The best of film 2014: The ballots - A.A. Dowd	#13	Boyhood	
Chicago Tribune		18 December 2014	Michael Phillips' Best Movies of 2014	#11-30	Boyhood	
The Arizona Republic		18 December 2014	Top 10 Movies Of 2014	#7	Boyhood	
UTV Media		18 December 2014	B. H. Martin's The Best Films of 2014	No order	N/A	
The Hollywood Reporter		19 December 2014	Todd McCarthy's 10 Best Films of 2014	#4	Leviathan	
British Film Institute		19 December 2014	The 20 Best Films of 2014 - International Contributors and Colleagues Choice	#9	Boyhood	
The Dissolve		19 December 2014	Keith Phipps’ top 15 films of 2014	#12	Boyhood	
Consequence of Sound		19 December 2014	Top 25 Films of 2014	#6	Under the Skin	
Associated Press		19 December 2014	The AP's Top 10 Movies of the Year according to AP Film Writer Jake Coyle	#1	N/A	
Associated Press		19 December 2014	The AP's Top 10 Movies of the Year according to AP National Writer Jocelyn Noveck	#4	Boyhood	
Pedro Almodóvar's Best in Cinema in 2014		20 December 2014	Best Non-Spanish Language Film	#1	N/A	
Cineuropa		22 December 2014	European TOP 5 of 2014	#2	Force Majeure	
The Daily Beast		22 December 2014	Marlow Stern's 20 Best Movies of 2014	#4	Boyhood	
The Atlantic		22 December 2014	Christopher Orr's The Best Movies of 2014	#8	A Most Violent Year	
Toronto Star		22 December 2014	Peter Howell's Top 10 of the best movies of 2014	#8	Boyhood	
Contactmusic.com		23 December 2014	Rich Cline's 10 Best Films of 2014	#9	Boyhood	
Screen International		23 December 2014	Mark Adams' Top 10 Films of 2014	#2	Birdman	
Screen International		23 December 2014	Jeremy Kay's Top 10 Films of 2014	#2	Force Majeure	
Screen International		23 December 2014	Wendy Mitchel's Top 10 Films of 2014	#7	Whiplash	
Screen International		23 December 2014	Michael Rosser's Top 10 Films of 2014	#6	Whiplash	
Screen International		23 December 2014	Andreas Wiseman's Top 10 Films of 2014	#5	A Pigeon Sat on a Branch Reflecting on Existence	
Film Ireland		23 December 2014	Anthony Assad' Top 5 Films of 2014	No order	N/A	
Film Ireland		23 December 2014	Martin Cusack's Top 10 Films of 2014	#2	Nightcrawler	
Film Ireland		23 December 2014	David Turpin's Top 10 Films of 2014	#2	Under the Skin	
The Wall Street Journal		26 December 2014	Joe Morgenstern's Best Films of 2014	#2-10	Boyhood	
Metacritic		1 January 2015	Best Film of 2014	#10 score 90	Boyhood	
The Jerusalem Post		1 January 2015	Hannah Brown's Top 10 Best Movies	#3	Zero Motivation	

=== Indiewire 2014 Year-End Critics Poll ===
Representing	Person	Result	Lost to	Refs
New York Post	V.A. Musetto	#1	N/A	
Having Said That	Zac Oldenburg	#1	N/A	
Gay City News (NYC) Philadelphia Gay News	Gary M. Kramer	#1	N/A	
The Wall Street Journal	Steve Dollar	#1	N/A	
The Independent (UK) Sydney Morning Herald The National (Scotland)	Kaleem Aftab	#1	N/A	
Westwood One / MovieJake	Jake Jacobson	#1	N/A	
—	Niclas Goldberg	#1	N/A	
Indiewire	Carlos Aguilar	#2	Song of the Sea	
Independent Magazine	Kurt Brokaw	#2	Boyhood	
BoxOffice	Daniel Loria	#2	Nymphomaniac	
RogerEbert.com Metro Magazine	Godfrey Cheshire	#2	Citizenfour	
Christianity Today	Alissa Wilkinson	#2	Boyhood	
Variety The Hollywood Reporter Winq Filmkrant EAST Indiewire	Boyd van Hoeij	#2	Stranger by the Lake	
amNewYork Film School Rejects The Atlantic	Robert Levin	#2	Boyhood	
—	J Hoberman	#3	Boyhood	
Talking Pictures	Lisa Rosman	#3	Boyhood	
The Village Voice	Aaron Hillis	#3	Under the Skin	
Cinematical Hollywood.com	Jenni Miller	#3	Only Lovers Left Alive	
Movie Mezzanine	Tomris Laffly	#3	Birdman	
To Be (Cont'd)	Andrew Welch	#3	Interstellar	
Hammer To Nail	Michael Tully	#4	Boyhood	
Thompson on Hollywood!	Matt Brennan	#4	Under the Skin	
NPR reeldc.com	Mark Jenkins	#4	Closed Curtain	
Criticwire	Steve Greene	#4	Manakamana	
Film School Rejects	Daniel Walber	#4	What Now? Remind Me	
The Playlist Way Too Indie	Nik Grozdanovic	#5	Leviathan	
I've Had It With Hollywood Out	Yehudit Mam	#5	Boyhood	
—	Molly Haskell	#5	Olive Kitteridge	
—	Saul Austerlitz	#5	Boyhood	
Toronto Star	Peter Howell	#6	Boyhood	
Slate The New York Times Magazine	Dan Kois	#6	Boyhood	
Newcity Movie City News	Ray Pride	#6	Boyhood	
Thompson on Hollywood!	Anne Thompson	#6	Birdman	
Indiewire	Eric Kohn	#6	Boyhood	
—	Brian Brooks	#6	Boyhood	
Baltimore (magazine)	Max Weiss	#6	The Grand Budapest Hotel	
—	Graham Fuller	#6	Leviathan	
—	Nelson Kim	#7	Under the Skin	
—	David Walsh	#7	Mr. Turner	
About.com	Jennifer Merin	#7	Mr. Turner	
Thompson on Hollywood!	Ryan Lattanzio	#7	Gone Girl	
The Village Voice LA Weekly The Cinema Girl	Serena Donadoni	#7	The Lunchbox	
Cinema Sope Fandor Northwest Film Forum	Jay Kuehner	#7	Boyhood	
The Film Experience	Nathaniel Rogers	#7	Birdman	
ArtForum	James Quandt	#7	Goodbye to Language	
The Buffalo News The Playlist The Film Stage	Christopher Schobert	#8	Under the Skin	
Tikkun Magazine	David Sterritt	#8	Goodbye to Language	
—	Kristi Mitsuda	#8	It Felt Like Love	
Documents on Art & Cinema	Daryl Chin	#8	Citizenfour	
Light Sensitive Stop Smiling The Nation	Patrick McGavin	#9	Boyhood	
The Hollywood Reporter	Stephen Farber	#9	The Imitation Game	
BuzzFeed	Alison Willmore	#9	Under the Skin	
Slant Magazine NPR	Tomas Hachard	#9	Only Lovers Left Alive	
cinemascope.co.il	Yair Raveh	#10	The Grand Budapest Hotel	
—	Gerald Peary	#10	Leviathan	
Sweet Smell of Success Arkansas Democrat-Gazette NBC	Piers Marchant	#10	Two Days, One Night	
Reverse Shot Film Comment The New York Times	Eric Hynes	#10	Boyhood	
Battleship Pretension CriterionCast	Scott Nye	#10	Two Days, One Night	
RogerEbert.com	Brian Tallerico	#10	Under the Skin	

== Appearances and presentations ==
Award	Country/State	Date of ceremony	Category	Refs
7th Telluride Film Festival	Colorado, US	30 August 2013	Show Section	
54th Thessaloniki International Film Festival	Greece, EU	10 November 2013	Special Screenings Section	
31st Torino Film Festival	Italy, EU	24 November 2013	Festa Mobile Section	
22nd New York Jewish Film Festival	New York, US	23 January 2014	Closing Night & New York Premiere Section	
30th Sundance Film Festival	Utah, US	26 January 2014	Spotlight Screenings Section	
10th Glasgow Film Festival	United Kingdom, EU	25 February 2014	Scottish Premiere Presentation	
3rd Montclair Film Festival	New Jersey, US	30 April 2014	Festival Lineup	
42nd Belgrade Film Festival	Serbia	4 March 2014	Europe Group	
9th Warsaw Summer Film Capital	Poland, EU	16 July 2014	Polin Presentation	
20th Sarajevo Film Festival	Bosnia and Herzegovina	19 August 2014	Kinoscope Section	
17th Jewish Summer Budapest Festival	Hungary, EU	28 August 2014	Film Presentation	
20th Baltic Pearl Film Festival	Latvia, EU	12 September 2014	A Certain Regard Section	
10th Windsor International Film Festival	Ontario, CA	3 November 2014	Foreign Section	
25th Stockholm International Film Festival	Sweden, EU	14 November 2014	Partnership Screenings	
7th Bengaluru International Film Festival	Karnataka, IN	11 December 2014	Fipresci Section	
10th Warsaw Summer Film Capital	Poland, EU	27 June 2015	Inspiring Stories - Artistic Żoliborz Section	
