= List of Academy Award winners and nominees from Poland =

This is a list of Academy Award winners and nominees who identify or are identified as Polish and/or whose career is associated predominantly with Poland. The list is current as of the 98th Academy Awards nominations. There were fifteen Academy Awards given to Polish filmmakers for their work, including one Honorary Academy Award, one Irving G. Thalberg Memorial Award, and one Jean Hersholt Humanitarian Award. The cinematographer Janusz Kamiński is the most awarded Polish filmmaker. The director Roman Polański won an Oscar and was nominated four more times (additionally, Knife in the Water, a film directed and written by him, was also nominated). Thirteen Polish pictures have been nominated for Best Foreign Language Film and one has won.

== Best Picture ==
Academy Award for Best Picture
Year	Names	Film	Status	Milestone / Notes
2002	Robert Benmussa; Roman Polanski; Alain Sarde	The Pianist	Nominated	The film was a French-British-Polish co-production.

== Best Director ==
Director
Year	Name	Film	Status	Milestone / Notes
1974	Roman Polański	Chinatown	Nominated	Polański holds dual Polish and French citizenship.
1980	Roman Polański	Tess	Nominated	Polański holds dual Polish and French citizenship.
1994	Krzysztof Kieślowski	Three Colours: Red	Nominated	
2002	Roman Polański	The Pianist	Won	First Polish director to win the award.
2018	Paweł Pawlikowski	Cold War	Nominated	First Polish director nominated for a Polish language film.

== Best Writing – Adapted Screenplay ==
Academy Award for Writing (Adapted Screenplay)
Year	Name	Film	Status	Milestone / Notes
1968	Roman Polański	Rosemary's Baby	Nominated	
1991	Agnieszka Holland	Europa Europa	Nominated	

== Best Writing – Original Screenplay ==
Academy Award for Writing (Original Screenplay)
Year	Name	Film	Status	Milestone / Notes
1994	Krzysztof Kieślowski; Krzysztof Piesiewicz	Three Colours: Red	Nominated	

== Best Actress in a Leading Role ==
Academy Award for Best Actress
Year	Name	Film	Status	Milestone / Notes
1967	Ida Kamińska	The Shop on Main Street	Nominated	

== Best Cinematography ==
Cinematography
Year	Name	Film	Status	Milestone / Notes
1993	Janusz Kamiński	Schindler's List	Won	
1994	Piotr Sobociński	Three Colours: Red	Nominated	
1997	Janusz Kamiński	Amistad	Nominated	
1998	Janusz Kamiński	Saving Private Ryan	Won	
2001	Sławomir Idziak	Black Hawk Down	Nominated	
2002	Paweł Edelman	The Pianist	Nominated	
2007	Janusz Kamiński	The Diving Bell and the Butterfly	Nominated	
2011	Janusz Kamiński	War Horse	Nominated	
2012	Janusz Kamiński	Lincoln	Nominated	
2014	Łukasz Żal; Ryszard Lenczewski	Ida	Nominated	
2018	Łukasz Żal	Cold War	Nominated	
2020	Dariusz Wolski	News of the World	Nominated	
2021	Janusz Kamiński	West Side Story	Nominated	

== Best International Feature Film ==
Academy Award for Best Foreign Language Film
Year	Name	Film	Status	Milestone / Notes
1963	Roman Polanski	Knife in the Water	Nominated	
1966	Jerzy Kawalerowicz	Pharaoh	Nominated	
1974	Jerzy Hoffman	The Deluge	Nominated	
1975	Andrzej Wajda	Land of Promise	Nominated	
1976	Jerzy Antczak	Nights and Days	Nominated	
1979	Andrzej Wajda	The Maids of Wilko	Nominated	
1981	Andrzej Wajda	Man of Iron	Nominated	
2007	Andrzej Wajda	Katyń	Nominated	
2011	Agnieszka Holland	In Darkness	Nominated	
2014	Paweł Pawlikowski	Ida	Won	
2018	Paweł Pawlikowski	Cold War	Nominated	
2019	Jan Komasa	Corpus Christi	Nominated	
2022	Jerzy Skolimowski	EO	Nominated	

== Best Art Direction ==
Art Direction
Year	Name	Film	Status	Milestone / Notes
1994	Ewa Braun; Allan Starski	Schindler's List	Won	

== Best Costume Design ==
Academy Award for Best Costume Design
Year	Name	Film	Status	Milestone / Notes
1994	Anna B. Sheppard	Schindler's List	Nominated	
2003	Anna B. Sheppard	The Pianist	Nominated	
2014	Anna B. Sheppard	Maleficent	Nominated	
2025	Malgosia Turzanska	Hamnet	Nominated	

== Best Original Music Score ==
Original Score
Year	Name	Film	Status	Milestone / Notes
1941	Bronisław Kaper	The Chocolate Soldier	Nominated	Shared with Herbert Stothart; Best Achievement in Scoring of a Musical Picture
1953	Bronisław Kaper	Lili	Won	Best Achievement in Music Score of a Dramatic or Comedy Picture
1962	Bronisław Kaper	Mutiny on the Bounty	Nominated	Best Achievement in Music Score — Substantially Original
2004	Jan A. P. Kaczmarek	Finding Neverland	Won	Best Achievement in Music Written for Motion Pictures, Original Score

== Best Original Song ==
Original Song
Year	Name	Film	Status	Milestone / Notes
1962	Bronisław Kaper	Mutiny on the Bounty	Nominated	For the song ″Follow Me″; shared with Paul Francis Webster.

== Best Live Action Short Film ==
Academy Award for Best Live Action Short Film
Year	Name	Film	Status	Milestone / Notes
2001	Sławomir Fabicki; Bogumił Godfrejow	A Man Thing	Nominated	
2021	Tadeusz Łysiak; Maciej Ślesicki	The Dress	Nominated	

== Best Documentary (Feature) ==
Academy Award for Best Documentary (Feature)
Year	Name	Film	Status	Milestone / Notes
2024	Aniela Sidorska	Porcelain War	Nominated	Shared with Brendan Bellomo, Slava Leontyev, and Paula DuPré Pesmen

== Best Documentary (Short Subject) ==
Academy Award for Best Documentary (Short Subject)
Year	Name	Film	Status	Milestone / Notes
1995	Marcel Łoziński	89mm from Europe	Nominated	
2005	Hanna Polak; Andrzej Celiński	The Children of Leningradsky	Nominated	
2010	Bartosz Konopka; Anna Wydra	Rabbit à la Berlin	Nominated	
2014	Aneta Kopacz	Joanna	Nominated	
2014	Tomasz Śliwiński; Maciej Ślesicki	Our Curse	Nominated	

== Best Animated Short Film ==
Academy Award for Animated Short Film
Year	Name	Film	Status	Milestone / Notes
1982	Zbigniew Rybczyński	Tango	Won	
2002	Tomasz Bagiński	The Cathedral	Nominated	
2007	Maciek Szczerbowski	Madame Tutli-Putli	Nominated	Shared with Chris Lavis. Szczerbowski is a Polish-born Canadian animator.
2025	Maciek Szczerbowski	The Girl Who Cried Pearls	Won	Shared with Chris Lavis. Szczerbowski is a Polish-born Canadian animator.

== Best Animated Feature ==
This list focuses on Polish-born filmmakers.

Academy Award for Best Animated Feature
Year	Name	Film	Status	Milestone / Notes
2017	Dorota Kobiela	Loving Vincent	Nominated	A Polish–British film co-directed with Hugh Welchman.

== Academy Honorary Award ==
Academy Honorary Award
Year	Name	Film	Status	Milestone / Notes
1999	Andrzej Wajda	—	Won	"In recognition of five decades of extraordinary film direction."

== Technical & Scientific Awards ==
Technical/Scientific Awards
Year	Name	Film	Status	Milestone / Notes
1940	Anton Grot	—	Won	For the design and perfection of the Warner Bros. water ripple and wave illusion machine.
1965	Stefan Kudelski	—	Won	For the design and development of the Nagra portable 1/4" tape recording system for motion picture sound recording.
1977	Stefan Kudelski	—	Won	For the engineering of the improvements incorporated in the Nagra 4.2L sound recorder for motion picture production.
1978	Stefan Kudelski	—	Won	For the continuing research, design and development of the Nagra Production Sound Recorder for Motion Pictures.
1987	Tadeusz Krzanowski	—	Won	For the development of a Wire Rig Model Support Mechanism used to control the movements of miniatures in special effects.

== Nominations and winners ==
No. of wins	No. of nominations
15	66

== See also ==
- Cinema of Poland
