= Marcela Iacub =

Argentine writer, academic and jurist

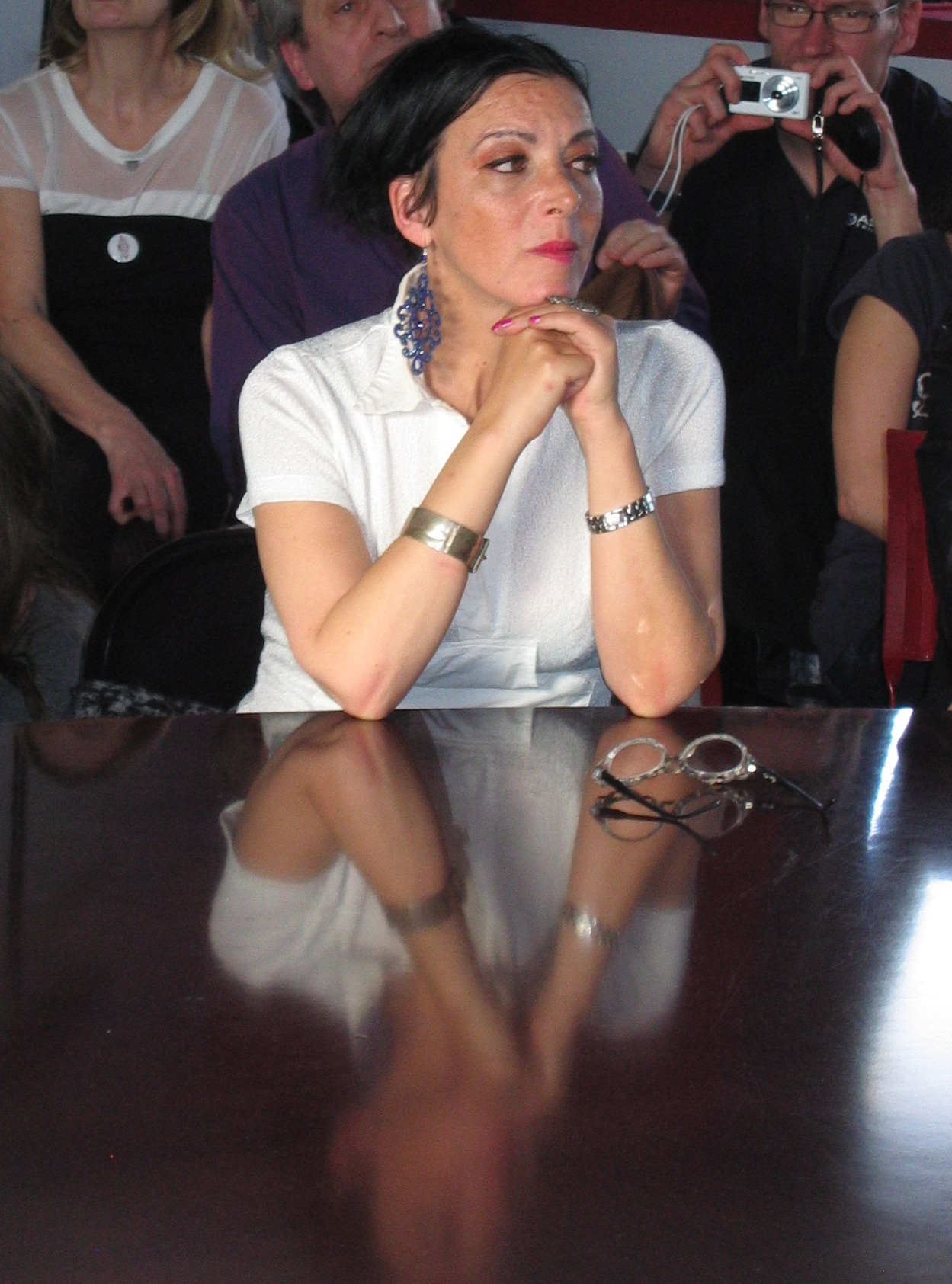
- Marcela Iacub, 2014
- Born: 1964 (age 61–62); Buenos Aires, Argentina
- Occupations: Novelist; Journalist
- Writing career
- Language: French
- Genre: bioethics
- Notable work: Belle et Bête

Marcela Iacub (born 1964) is an Argentine writer and jurist specializing in bioethics research, living in France. In 2013, Iacub was successfully sued for invasion of privacy by Dominique Strauss-Kahn: her novel Belle et Bête included a character based on him.

== Life and work ==
The daughter of a lawyer, she was born and raised in Buenos Aires into an Argentine family of Jewish background. Her family ancestors were Belarusian and Ukrainian Jews, although she considers herself as an atheist. She studied law and became the youngest member of the Buenos Aires bar at the age of 21. She continued her studies at the School for Advanced Studies in the Social Sciences (EHESS) in France. Iacub became a researcher at the Centre national de la recherche scientifique as well as an associate member of the Centre d'étude des normes juridiques at EHESS. She was also a columnist for the newspaper Libération. Iacub is known for voicing opinions contrary to those of mainstream French feminists.

In 2001, with Pierre Jouannet, she published Juger la vie. The following year, she published a collection of essays Le crime était presque sexuel et autres essais de casuistique juridique.

In 2012, she published Une société de violeurs? which defended Dominique Strauss-Kahn and criticized feminist critics for their portrayal of men. An affair with Strauss-Kahn followed which ended in August that year.

In September 2014, she became a panelist on the RTL radio show Les Grosses Têtes.

== Filmography ==
- 2011 : The Woman in the Fifth, directed by Paweł Pawlikowski : Isabella

== Selected works ==
- Une journée dans la vie de Lionel Jospin (2006)
- Par le trou de la serrure. Une histoire de la pudeur publique, XIX-XXIe siècle (2008)

== See also ==
- Lists of writers
