= 2013 American Society of Cinematographers Awards =

Annual US film and television awards

28th ASC Awards
- Date: February 1, 2014
- Site: Hollywood & Highland Ray Dolby Ballroom

Highlights
- Cinematography in Theatrical Releases: Gravity

The 28th American Society of Cinematographers Awards were held on February 1, 2014, at the Hollywood & Highland Ray Dolby Ballroom, honoring the best cinematographers of film and television in 2013.

The film nominees were announced on January 8, 2014. A three-way tie boosted the number of film nominees to seven. Sean Bobbitt, Philippe Le Sourd, and Phedon Papamichael received their first nominations in the film category (though Papamichael has received prior nominations for his TV work).

This year also marked the inaugural Spotlight Award "to recognize outstanding cinematography in features and documentaries typically screened at film festivals, internationally or in limited theatrical release". The nominees were announced on January 14, 2014.

With his third win in the film cinematography category, Emmanuel Lubezki joined Roger Deakins and Conrad L. Hall as the only cinematographers to have won the award more than twice.

== Winners and nominees ==
=== Board of Directors Award ===
- awarded to writer-director-producer John Wells.

=== Film ===
==== Outstanding Achievement in Cinematography in Theatrical Release ====
- Emmanuel Lubezki, ASC, AMC – Gravity
  - Barry Ackroyd, BSC – Captain Phillips
  - Sean Bobbitt, BSC – 12 Years a Slave
  - Roger Deakins, ASC, BSC – Prisoners
  - Bruno Delbonnel, ASC, AFC – Inside Llewyn Davis
  - Philippe Le Sourd – The Grandmaster
  - Phedon Papamichael, ASC – Nebraska

==== Spotlight Award ====
- Łukasz Żal and Ryszard Lenczewski – Ida
  - Mark Lee Ping Bin – Renoir
  - Camille Cottagnoud – Winter Nomads

=== Television ===
==== Outstanding Achievement in Cinematography in One-Hour Episodic Television Series ====
- Jonathan Freeman, ASC – Game of Thrones (Episode: "Valar Dohaeris") (HBO)
  - Steven Bernstein, ASC – Magic City (Episode: "The Sins of the Father") (Starz)
  - David Franco – Boardwalk Empire (Episode: "Erlkönig") (HBO)
  - Pierre Gill, CSC – The Borgias (Episode: "The Purge") (Showtime)
  - David Greene, CSC – Beauty and the Beast (Episode: "Tough Love") (The CW)
  - Anette Haellmigk – Game of Thrones (Episode: "Kissed by Fire") (HBO)
  - Kramer Morgenthau, ASC – Sleepy Hollow (Episode: "Pilot") (Fox)
  - Ousama Rawi, BSC, CSC – Dracula (Episode: "The Blood Is the Life") (NBC)

==== Outstanding Achievement in Cinematography in Half-Hour Episodic Series ====
- Blake McClure – Drunk History (Episode: "Detroit") (Comedy Central)
  - Peter Levy, ASC, ACS – House of Lies (Episode: "The Runner Stumbles") (Showtime)
  - Matthew J. Lloyd, CSC – Alpha House (Episode: "Pilot") (Amazon)

==== Outstanding Achievement in Cinematography in Television Movie/Miniseries ====
- Jeremy Benning, CSC – Killing Lincoln (National Geographic)
  - David Luther – The White Queen (Episode: "War at First Hand") (Starz)
  - Ashley Rowe, BSC – Dancing on the Edge (Episode: "Episode 1.1") (Starz)

=== Other awards ===
- ASC International Award: Eduardo Serra
- Bud Stone Award of Distinction: Beverly Wood
- Career Achievement in Television: Richard M. Rawlings Jr.
- Lifetime Achievement Award: Dean Cundey
