= The Woman in the Fifth =

- Theatrical release poster in France
- Directed by: Paweł Pawlikowski
- Screenplay by: Pawel Pawlikowski
- Based on: The Woman in the Fifth by Douglas Kennedy
- Produced by: Caroline Benjo; Carole Scotta
- Starring: Ethan Hawke; Kristin Scott Thomas
- Cinematography: Ryszard Lenczewski
- Edited by: David Charap
- Music by: Max de Wardener
- Production companies: Haut et Court; Film4 Productions; SPI International Poland; The Bureau
- Distributed by: Memento Films
- Release dates: 11 September 2011 (TIFF); 16 November 2011 (France); 17 February 2012 (UK); 15 June 2012 (US)
- Running time: 85 minutes
- Countries: France; Poland; United Kingdom
- Languages: French; English; Polish
- Box office: $662,000

The Woman in the Fifth (French: La femme du Vème) is a 2011 French-British-Polish drama film directed and written by Paweł Pawlikowski. Adapted from Douglas Kennedy's 2007 novel of the same name, the film centers on a divorced American writer (Ethan Hawke) who moves to Paris to be closer to his young daughter. As he embarks on an affair with a mysterious widow (Kristin Scott Thomas), a dark force seems to be taking control of his life.

== Plot ==
American writer Tom Ricks arrives in Paris to be closer to his young daughter, who lives with his ex-wife. The divorce was prompted by Tom's mental illness, from which he has apparently recovered. After his possessions and money are stolen, he accepts a job as a night guard for Sezer, a local crime boss who owns a run-down hostel. Stationed in a basement office, his only task is to admit visitors who give the correct password. The tranquility of the nights, he hopes, will help him focus on his new novel.

Tom begins romance with Margit, a mysterious and elegant widow who sets strange rules to their meetings: she will only see him at her apartment in the fifth arrondissement, at 5pm sharp, twice a week, and she forbids him to ask questions about her work or her past life. At the same time, Tom grows closer to Ania, the Polish barmaid at the hostel's café, who has literary interests and seeks out a copy of Tom's only published novel.

Tom's relationship with Ania turns into a sexual affair, and he is blackmailed by Omar, another resident of the hostel, who threatens to reveal it to Sezer, who has a possessive relationship with Ania. Shortly afterward, Omar is found murdered, and the police hold Tom as a suspect, but release him the next day after arresting Sezer. However, when he gives Margit as his alibi for the time of the murder, he is told that Margit Kahn committed suicide in 1991 after killing the man who ran over her daughter.

Tom goes to Ania, but they are interrupted by the police, who inform Tom that his daughter has gone missing. Distraught, Tom returns to talk to Margit, though he now knows she is a figment of his imagination. Margit tells him to leave his wife, daughter, and Ania behind and be with her forever, but Tom demands to know what happened to his daughter.

Tom's daughter is eventually found wandering in the forest, and is reunited with her mother. Ania waits for Tom at the cafè, but he never arrives. After discarding most of a letter he had been writing to his daughter, Tom ascends the stairs to the apartment in the 5th once again, where the door opens and a bright light engulfs him.

== Cast ==
- Ethan Hawke as Tom Ricks
- Kristin Scott Thomas as Margit Kadar
- Joanna Kulig as Ania
- Samir Guesmi as Sezer
- Marcela Iacub as Isabella
- Anne Benoît as Teacher
- Grégory Gadebois as Lieutenant Children Unit

== Production ==
The Woman in the Fifth was produced by Paris-based Haut Et Court with UK's Film4 Productions, and co-financed by the UK Film Council and SPI Poland.

Pawlikowski saw the film as "a story about a man torn between the need for family and stability and the need to be creative". In 2009, he approached Hawke to play the lead character while the actor was performing in a play at the Old Vic in London. Thomas was cast as the "woman in the Fifth" shortly afterward.

The filming took place in Paris from April to June 2010.

== Release ==
Premiered at the 2011 Toronto International Film Festival, the film opened in France on 16 November 2011. The following year it was released in the UK on 17 February and in the US on 15 June.

== Reception ==
The film received mixed reviews. On review aggregator Rotten Tomatoes, the film holds an approval rating of 59% based on 58 reviews, with an average rating of 5/10. On Metacritic, the film has a weighted average score of 57 out of 100, based on 18 critics, indicating "mixed or average reviews".
