= Łukasz Żal =

Polish cinematographer (born 1981)

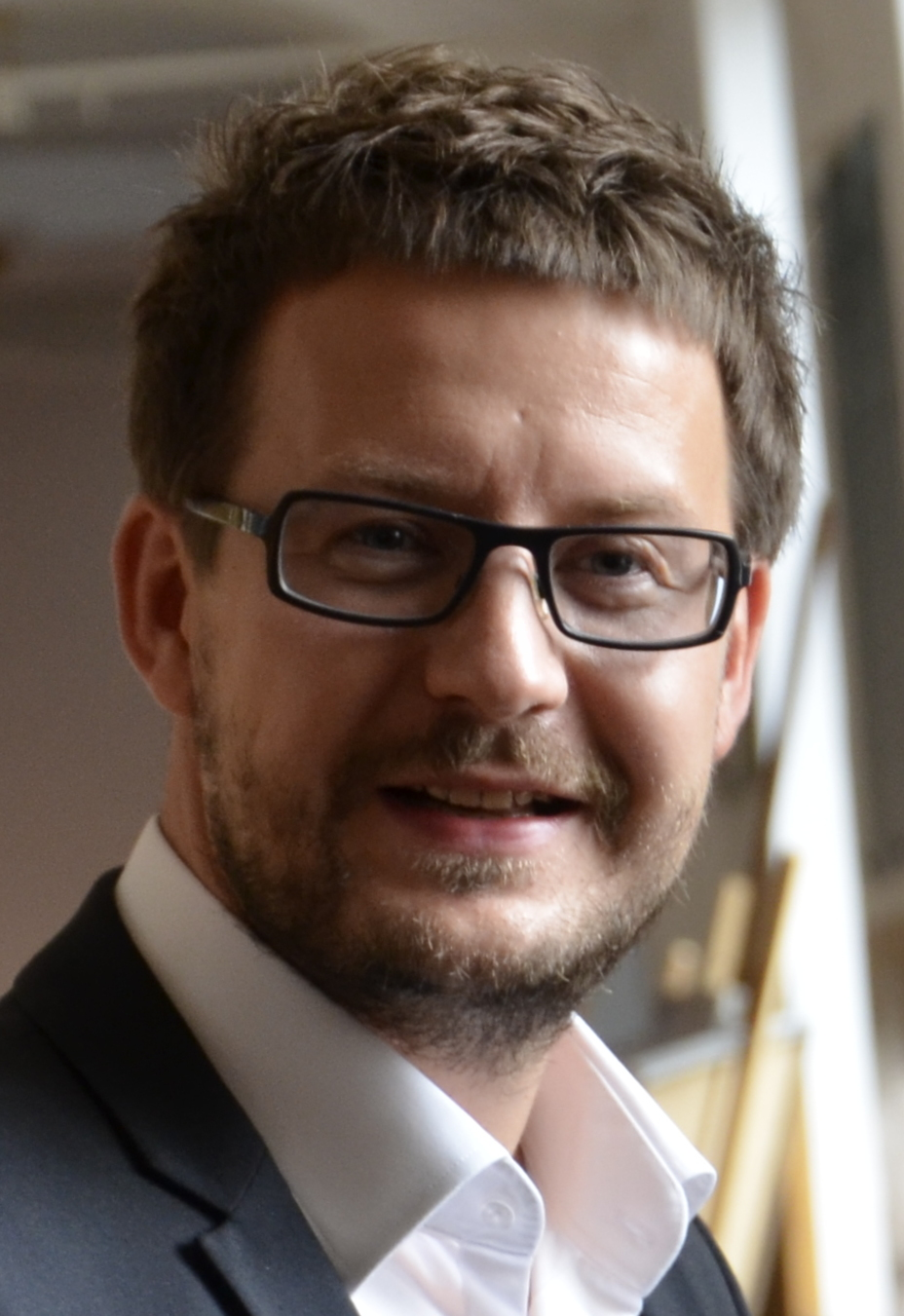
- Łukasz Żal (2015)
- Born: 24 June 1981 (age 45); Koszalin, Poland
- Education: National Film School in Łódź
- Occupation: Cinematographer
- Years active: 2004–present

Łukasz Żal (Polish pronunciation: [ˈwukaʐ ˈʐal]; born 24 June 1981) is a Polish cinematographer, best known for his work on the films Ida (2014), Loving Vincent (2017), Cold War (2018) and The Zone of Interest (2023).

== Life and career ==
Żal has said that he "fell in love" with cinema at the age of 16, when he attended a course on filmmaking held at a local gymnasium in his home town of Koszalin, Poland. His interest in photography was sparked by a friend, who asked to use him as a subject and also showed him how to use a camera. He went on to study photography at the Leon Schiller National Film, Television and Theatre School in Łódź, from which he graduated in 2007. Whilst there, he watched many films and decided to pursue a career as a cinematographer because of the "stronger emotional content" he observed in movies.

When preparing to work on a film, Żal has stated that he reads though the script and tries "to find part of [him]self in the movie".

In 2019 he was made an Honorary Fellow of the British Royal Photographic Society, from which he also received the annual Lumière Award.

He has been named as the recipient of the Variety Artisan Award at the 2023 Toronto International Film Festival.

== Filmography ==
=== Feature film ===
Year	Title	Director	Notes
2013	Ida	Paweł Pawlikowski	With Ryszard Lenczewski
2015	The Here After	Magnus von Horn	
2016	Na granicy	Wojciech Kasperski	
2016	Ikona	Wojciech Kasperski	Documentary film
2017	Loving Vincent	Dorota Kobiela; Hugh Welchman	With Tristan Oliver
2018	Dovlatov	Aleksei Alekseivich German	
2018	Cold War	Paweł Pawlikowski	
2020	I'm Thinking of Ending Things	Charlie Kaufman	
2023	The Zone of Interest	Jonathan Glazer	
2025	Hamnet	Chloé Zhao	
2026	Fatherland	Paweł Pawlikowski	

=== Short film ===
Year	Title	Director	Notes
2015	The Dragon	Tomasz Bagiński	Segments of Polish Legends
2015	Twardowsky	Tomasz Bagiński	Segments of Polish Legends
2023	Til Further Notice	Valdimar Jóhannsson	Segment of Circus Maximus

Documentary short

Year	Title	Director
2011	Papparazzi	Piotr Bernas
2013	Joanna	Aneta Kopacz
2013	Arena	Piotr Bernas
2013	Lewa połowa twarzy	Marcin Bortkiewicz

== Awards and nominations ==
=== Major awards ===
Year	Category	Nominated work	Result	Ref.
Academy Awards
2014	Best Cinematography	Ida	Nominated	
2018	Best Cinematography	Cold War	Nominated	
British Academy Film Awards
2014	Best Cinematography	Ida	Nominated	
2018	Best Cinematography	Cold War	Nominated	
2024	Best Cinematography	The Zone of Interest	Nominated	
American Society of Cinematographers Awards
2014	Spotlight Award	Ida	Won	
2018	Outstanding Achievement in Cinematography in Theatrical Releases	Cold War	Won	

=== Critics awards ===
Year	Award	Category	Nominated work	Result	Ref.
2013	National Polish Film Festival	Best Cinematography	Ida	Won	
2013	Warsaw Jewish Film Festival	Best Cinematographer	Ida	Won	
2013	20th Listapad	Best Photography	Ida	Won	
2013	Camerimage International Film Festival	Golden Frog	Ida	Won	
2014	Polish Society of Cinematographers Awards	PSC Award	Ida	Won	
2014	Polish Academy Film Awards	Best Cinematography	Ida	Nominated	
2014	Mediaş Central European Film Festival	Best Cinematography Award	Ida	Won	
2014	Manaki Brothers Film Festival	Silver Camera	Ida	Won	
2014	European Film Awards	Best Cinematographer	Ida	Won	
2014	San Francisco Film Critics Circle Awards	Best Cinematography	Ida	Won	
2014	Online Film Critics Society Awards	Best Cinematography	Ida	Nominated	
2014	Chicago Film Critics Association Awards	Best Cinematography	Ida	Nominated	
2015	Polish Independent Cinema Awards	Best Cinematography	Joanna	Nominated	
2016	Kraków Film Festival	Best Cinematography - Short Subject	Ikona	Won	
2018	Manaki Brothers Film Festival	Brown Camera	Cold War	Won	
2018	Camerimage International Film Festival	Silver Frog	Cold War	Won	
2018	Chicago Film Critics Association Awards	Best Cinematography	Cold War	Nominated	
2018	Boston Society of Film Critics Awards	Best Cinematography	Cold War	Nominated	
2018	Florida Film Critics Circle Awards	Best Cinematography	Cold War	Won	
2019	Online Film Critics Society Awards	Best Cinematography	Cold War	Nominated	
2019	North Carolina Film Critics Association Awards	Best Cinematography	Cold War	Nominated	
2019	Satellite Awards	Best Cinematography	Cold War	Nominated	

== See also ==
- Cinema of Poland
- List of Polish Academy Award winners and nominees
- List of Poles
