= Camerimage =

Film festival held in Toruń, Poland

The International Film Festival of the Art of Cinematography Camerimage
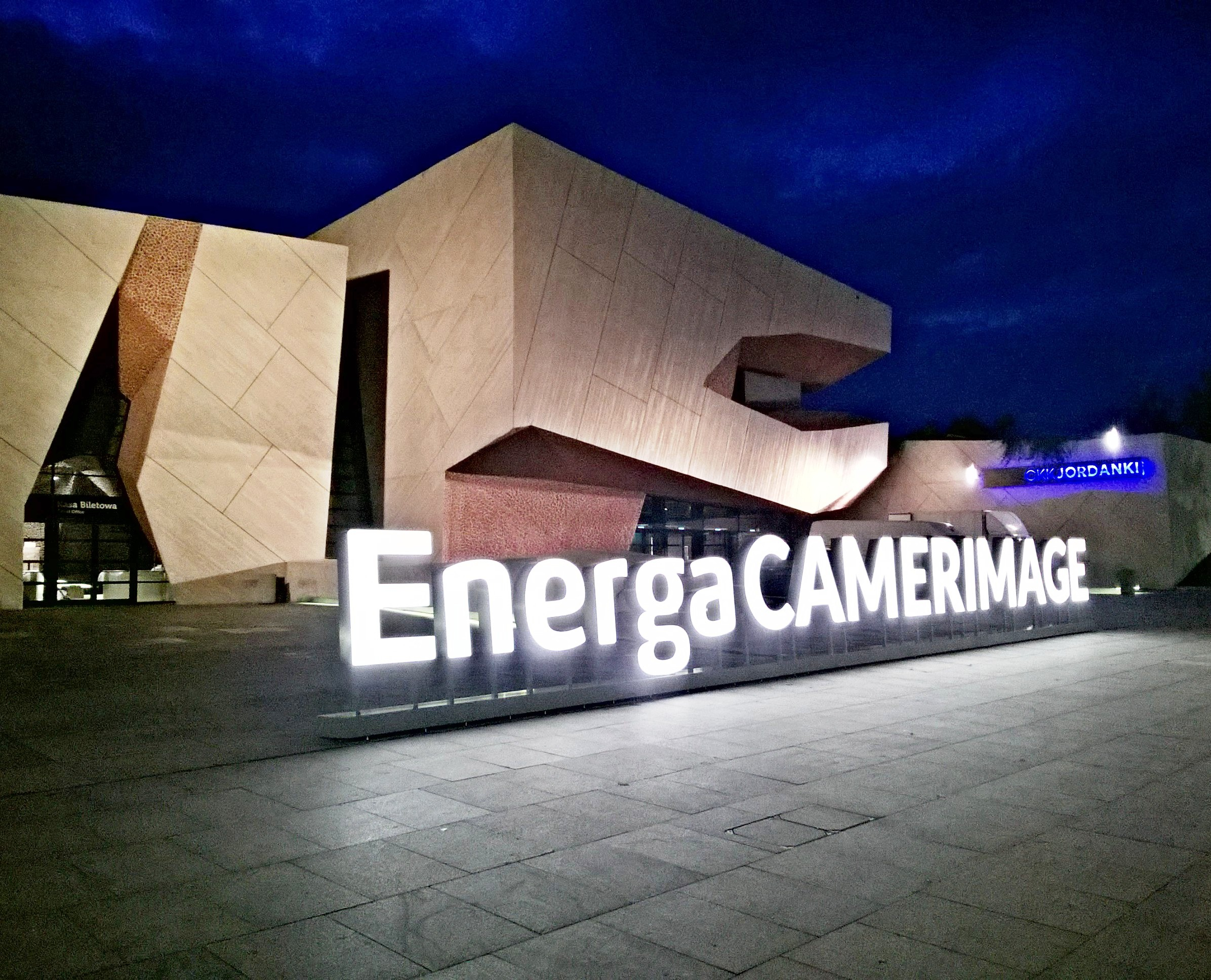
- Camerimage 2019, Jordanki Cultural Centre, Toruń
- Location: Poland: 1993–1999 Toruń; 2000–2009 Łódź; 2010–2018 Bydgoszcz; 2019–present Toruń
- Founded: 1993; 33 years ago
- Most recent: 33rd International Film Festival of the Art of Cinematography Camerimage
- Artistic director: Marek Żydowicz
- Website: camerimage.pl/en/

The International Film Festival of the Art of Cinematography Camerimage (Polish: Międzynarodowy Festiwal Sztuki Autorów Zdjęć Filmowych Camerimage) is a festival that celebrates and awards cinematography and cinematographers. The festival is held in Toruń, Poland, at the end of November every year. It spans the course of one week, with multiple events at one time.

The first seven events (1993–1999) were held in Toruń, and the next ten events (2000–2009) were held in Łódź. From 2010 until 2018, the festival took place in Bydgoszcz, before returning to Toruń in 2019, where it currently remains. In 2007, the name of the festival was changed from Camerimage to Plus Camerimage, but it was changed back in 2013 after the sponsorship deal with Plus ended.

The festival has hosted many prominent filmmakers including Darren Aronofsky, Jon M. Chu, Alfonso Cuarón, Peter Greenaway, Agnieszka Holland, James Ivory, Jim Jarmusch, Aki Kaurismäki, Krzysztof Kieślowski, Andrei Konchalovsky, Emir Kusturica, Ang Lee, Ken Loach, David Lynch, Paweł Pawlikowski, Roman Polański, Robert Richardson, Gus Van Sant, Ridley Scott, Volker Schlöndorff, Oliver Stone, István Szabó, Quentin Tarantino, Tom Tykwer, Denis Villeneuve, Andrzej Wajda, Peter Weir, and Wim Wenders.

A controversy erupted shortly before the festival’s 32nd edition, which took place from November 16 to 23, 2024, and stemmed from an editorial Żydowicz published in Cinematography World magazine.

In the editorial, Żydowicz appeared to argue that increasing the representation of female cinematographers and directors in the festival’s programming could compromise artistic quality, potentially leading to the inclusion of “mediocre film productions” at the expense of “works and artists with outstanding artistic achievements.” He questioned whether festivals should “sacrifice” high-quality works to accommodate social changes, suggesting that Camerimage’s commitment to artistic merit set it apart from other festivals like Cannes or Berlin, which he implied had bowed to ideological pressures.

These comments triggered a swift and widespread backlash from the film industry. Many interpreted them as misogynistic, arguing that they dismissed the talent and contributions of women in cinematography and perpetuated gender biases in an already male-dominated field. The British Society of Cinematographers (BSC) issued an open letter condemning Żydowicz’s “profoundly misogynistic comments and aggressive tone,” calling them indicative of deep-rooted prejudice. The American Society of Cinematographers (ASC) and the International Cinematographers Guild (IATSE Local 600) echoed this sentiment, expressing disappointment and support for the BSC’s stance. Women in Cinematography, an advocacy group, highlighted the festival’s historical underrepresentation of women—noting that only 3.1% of films in the main competition over 30 years were shot by female cinematographers—and criticized Camerimage for sidelining acclaimed works by women, such as Mudbound and The Power of the Dog, from its top competitions.

== Awards ==
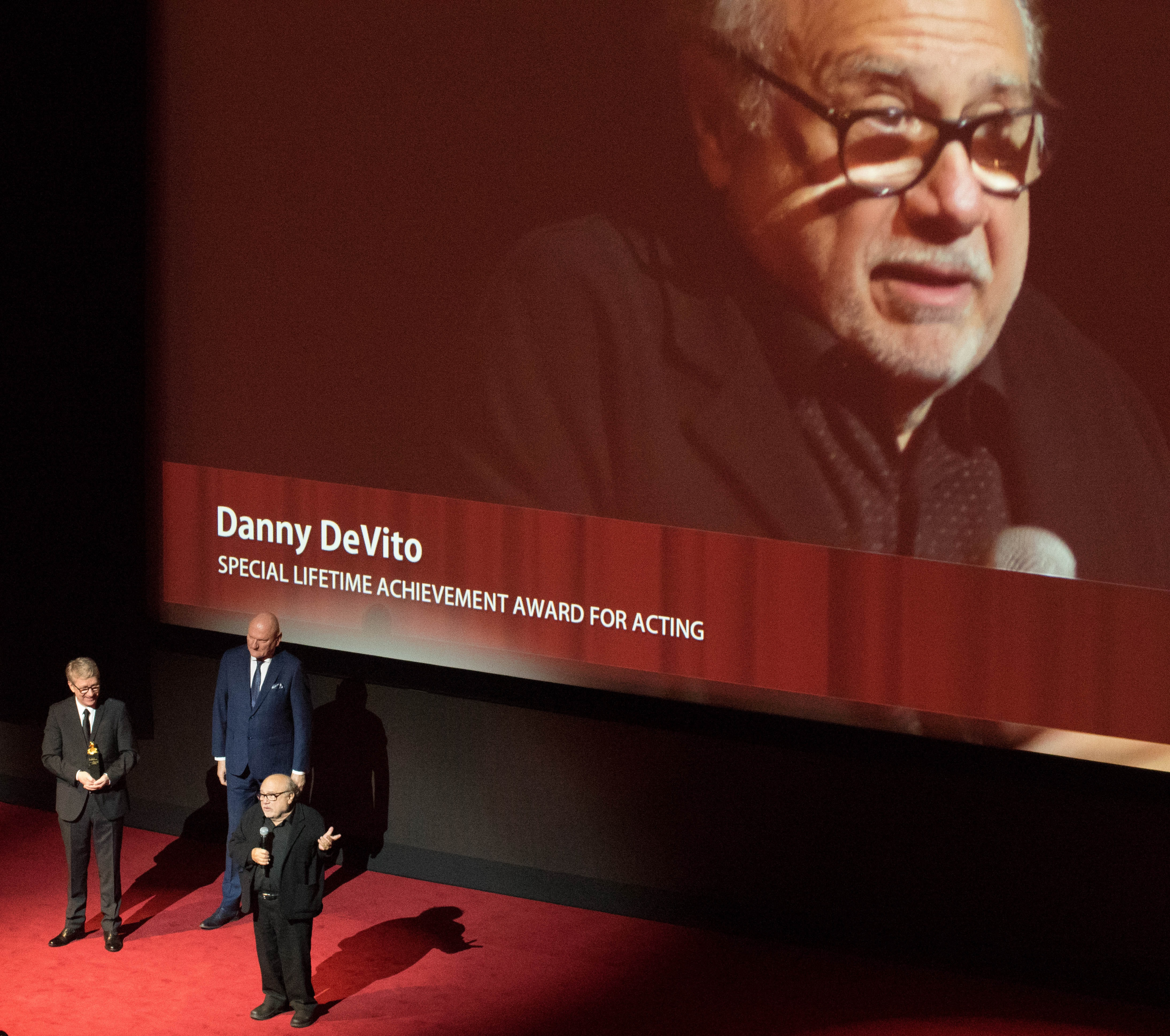
27th Edition of Camerimage Festival, Toruń, 2019

- Main Competition
  - Golden Frog (Polish: Złota Żaba)
  - Silver Frog (Srebrna Żaba)
  - Bronze Frog (Brązowa Żaba)
- Student Études Competition (Konkurs etiud studenckich)
  - Golden Tadpole (Złota Kijanka)
  - Silver Tadpole (Srebrna Kijanka)
  - Bronze Tadpole (Brązowa Kijanka)
- Documentary Films Competition
  - Documentary Shorts Competition
  - Documentary Features Competition
- Feature Debuts Competition
  - Directors' Debuts Competition
  - Cinematographers' Debuts Competition
- Music Videos Competition
  - Best Music Video
  - Best Cinematography in Music Video
- 3D Films Competition
- Polish Films Competition
- Camerimage Lifetime Achievement Award
- Cinematographer - Director Duo Award
- Special Krzysztof Kieślowski Award for Director
- Production Designer Award

== Main competition ==
=== Golden Frog winners ===
"†" indicates a nominee for the Academy Award for Best Cinematography.

| Year | Film | Original title | Cinematographer(s) | Ref |
|---|---|---|---|---|
| 1993 | The Piano † | | Stuart Dryburgh | |
| 1994 | Woyzeck (shared) | | Tibor Máthé | |
| 1994 | Crows (shared) | Wrony | Arthur Reinhart | |
| 1995 | The Seventh Room | A hetedik szoba | Piotr Sobociński | |
| 1996 | Secrets & Lies | | Dick Pope | |
| 1997 | Character | Karakter | Rogier Stoffers | |
| 1998 | Central Station | Central do Brasil | Walter Carvalho | |
| 1999 | Elizabeth † | | Remi Adefarasin | |
| 2000 | Amores perros | | Rodrigo Prieto | |
| 2001 | The King is Dancing | Le Roi danse | Gérard Simon | |
| 2002 | Edi (shared) | | Krzysztof Ptak | |
| 2002 | Road to Perdition (shared) † | | Conrad Hall | |
| 2003 | City of God † | Cidade de Deus | César Charlone | |
| 2004 | Vera Drake | | Dick Pope | |
| 2005 | Fateless | Sorstalanság | Gyula Pados | |
| 2006 | Pan's Labyrinth † | El laberinto del fauno | Guillermo Navarro | |
| 2007 | The Diving Bell and the Butterfly † | Le scaphandre et le papillon | Janusz Kamiński | |
| 2008 | Slumdog Millionaire † | | Anthony Dod Mantle | |
| 2009 | Lebanon | לבנון | Giora Bejach | |
| 2010 | Venice | Wenecja | Arthur Reinhart | |
| 2011 | In Darkness | W ciemności | Jolanta Dylewska | |
| 2012 | War Witch | Rebelle | Nicolas Bolduc | |
| 2013 | Ida † | | Łukasz Żal; Ryszard Lenczewski | |
| 2014 | Leviathan | Левиафан | Mikhail Krichman | |
| 2015 | Carol † | | Edward Lachman | |
| 2016 | Lion † | | Greig Fraser | |
| 2017 | On Body and Soul | Testről és lélekről | Máté Herbai | |
| 2018 | The Fortress | Namhansanseong | Ji Yong Kim | |
| 2019 | Joker † | | Lawrence Sher | |
| 2020 | Nomadland † | | Joshua James Richards | |
| 2021 | C'mon C'mon | | Robbie Ryan | |
| 2022 | Tár † | | Florian Hoffmeister | |
| 2023 | The New Boy | | Warwick Thornton | |
| 2024 | The Girl with the Needle | Pigen med nålen | Michał Dymek | |
| 2025 | Late Shift | Heldin | Judith Kaufmann | |
| 2026 | Fatherland | Ojczyzna | Łukasz Żal | |

== Additional festival events ==
- Camerimage Market
- Equipment showcases
- Various exhibitions and live music performances
- Student Panorama (screenings of student films which did not make it into the main competition)
- Camerimage Forum (a seminar devoted to authorship rights and working conditions of cinematographers)
- Special screenings and premieres, reviews, retrospectives, meetings, seminars, and workshops led by well known filmmakers

== Academy Awards ==
Since 2013, short documentary films awarded the Golden Frog during Camerimage festival are granted consideration in the Documentary Short Subject category of the Academy Awards without having to meet the standard theatrical run requirement. To meet all requirements, the running time limit of selected short documentary was decreased from 60 to 40 minutes. This way requirements for short documentary films selected at both Camerimage festival and the Academy Awards are the same.
