= Chicago Film Critics Association Awards 2014 =

Annual US film awards ceremony

27th Chicago Film Critics Association Awards
- Date: December 15, 2014
- Site: Chicago, Illinois, U.S.

Highlights
- Best Film: Boyhood
- Most awards: Boyhood & Whiplash (3)
- Most nominations: Birdman (9)

The 27th Chicago Film Critics Association Awards were announced on December 15, 2014. The awards honor the best in film for 2014. The first round ballots were due on December 11, 2014 and the nominations were announced on December 12. Birdman received the most nominations (9), followed by The Grand Budapest Hotel (8) and Boyhood (7).

== Winners and nominees ==
The winners and nominees for the 27th Chicago Film Critics Association Awards are as follows:

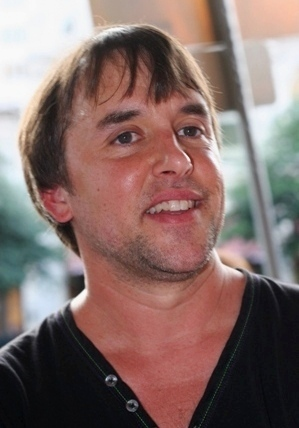
Richard Linklater, Best Director winner

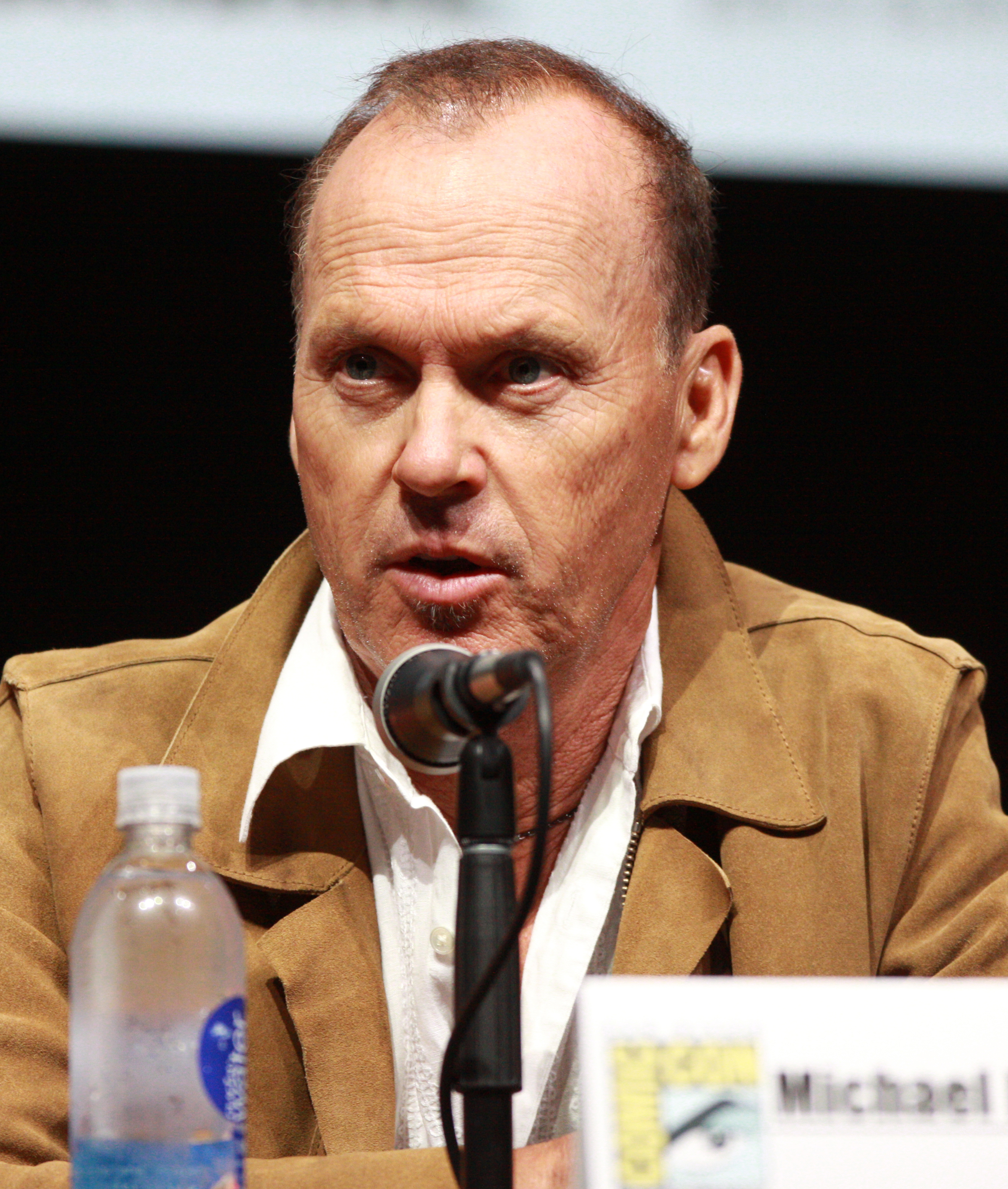
Michael Keaton, Best Actor winner

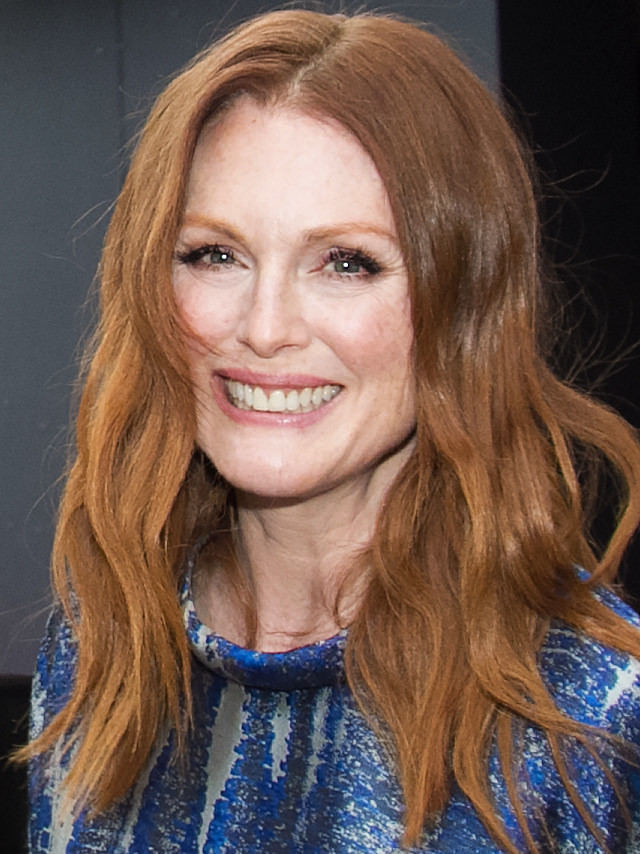
Julianne Moore, Best Actress winner

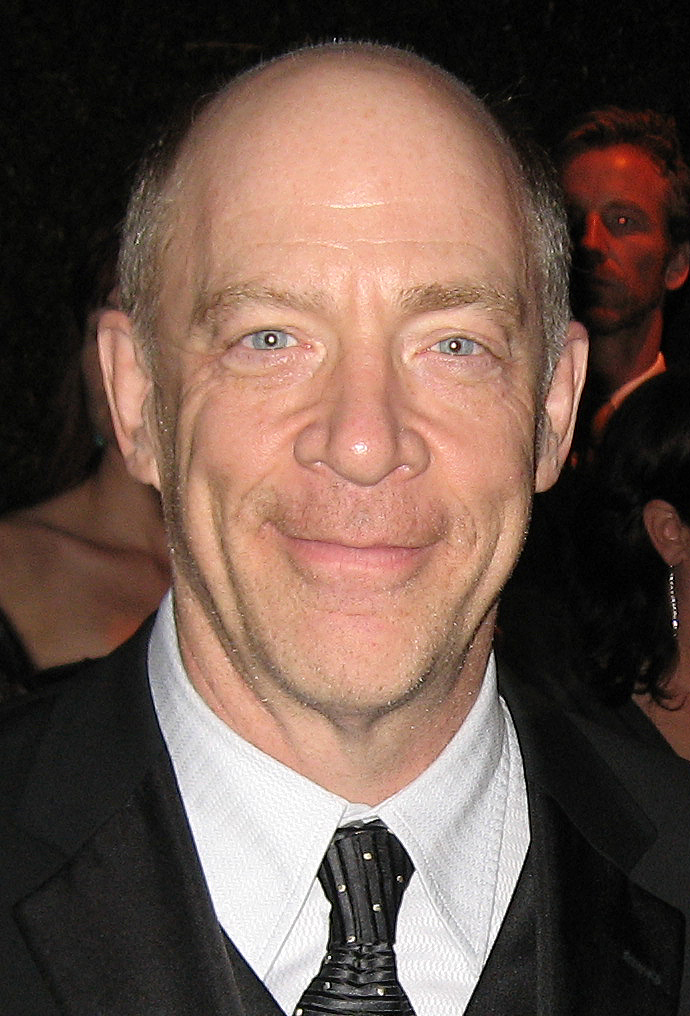
J.K. Simmons, Best Supporting Actor winner

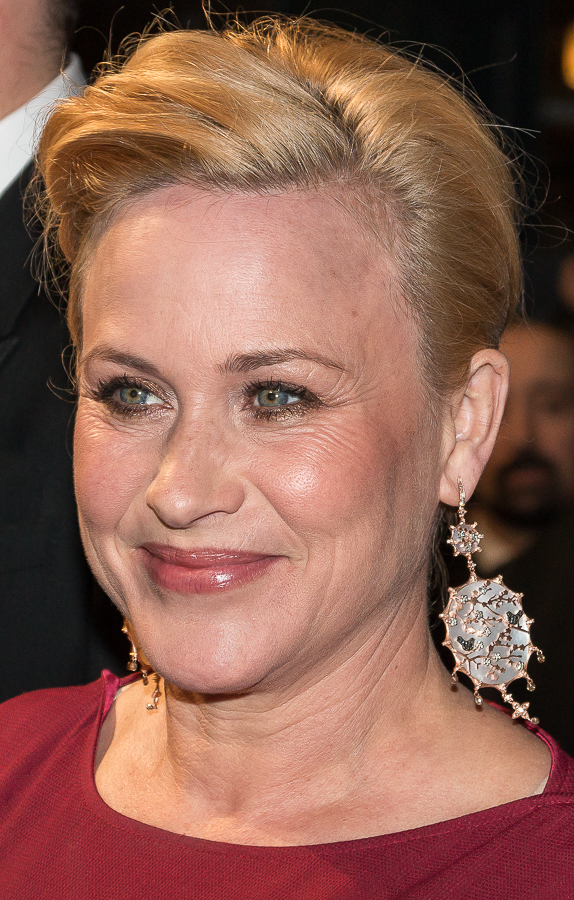
Patricia Arquette, Best Supporting Actress winner

=== Awards ===
Best Film	Best Director
Boyhood - Richard Linklater and Cathleen Sutherland: Birdman - Alejandro G. Inarritu, John Lesher and James W. Skotchdople; The Grand Budapest Hotel - Wes Anderson, Scott Rudin, Steven Rales and Jeremy Dawson; Under the Skin - James Wilson and Nick Wechsler; Whiplash - Jason Blum, Helen Estabrook and David Lancaster	Richard Linklater – Boyhood: Wes Anderson – The Grand Budapest Hotel; David Fincher – Gone Girl; Alejandro González Iñárritu – Birdman; Christopher Nolan – Interstellar
Best Actor	Best Actress
Michael Keaton – Birdman as Riggan Thomas: Benedict Cumberbatch – The Imitation Game as Alan Turing; Jake Gyllenhaal – Nightcrawler as Louis "Lou" Bloom; David Oyelowo – Selma as Martin Luther King, Jr.; Eddie Redmayne – The Theory of Everything as Stephen Hawking	Julianne Moore – Still Alice as Alice Howland: Marion Cotillard – Two Days, One Night as Sandra Bya; Scarlett Johansson – Under the Skin as Isserley; Rosamund Pike – Gone Girl as Amy Elliott-Dunne; Reese Witherspoon – Wild as Cheryl Strayed
Best Supporting Actor	Best Supporting Actress
J. K. Simmons – Whiplash as Terence Fletcher: Josh Brolin – Inherent Vice as Detective Christian F. "Bigfoot" Bjornsen; Ethan Hawke – Boyhood as Mason Evans, Sr.; Edward Norton – Birdman as Mike Shiner; Mark Ruffalo – Foxcatcher as Dave Schultz	Patricia Arquette – Boyhood as Olivia Evans: Jessica Chastain – A Most Violent Year as; Laura Dern – Wild as Bobbi Grey; Agata Kulesza – Ida as Anna/Ida Lebenstein; Emma Stone – Birdman as Sam Thomson
Best Original Screenplay	Best Adapted Screenplay
The Grand Budapest Hotel – Wes Anderson: Birdman – Alejandro González Iñárritu, Nicolas Giacobone, Alexander Dinelaris and Armando Bó; Boyhood – Richard Linklater; Calvary – John Michael McDonagh; Whiplash – Damien Chazelle	Gone Girl – Gillian Flynn based on the novel: The Imitation Game – Graham Moore based on the book Alan Turing: The Enigma by Andrew Hodges; Inherent Vice – Paul Thomas Anderson based on the novel by Thomas Pynchon; Under the Skin – Walter Campbell based on the novel by Michel Farber; Wild – Nick Hornby based on the memoir by Cheryl Strayed
Best Animated Film	Best Foreign Language Film
The Lego Movie - Phil Lord, Christopher Miller, Dan Lin and Roy Lee: Big Hero 6 - Don Hall, Chris Williams and Roy Conli; The Boxtrolls - Anthony Stacchi, Graham Annable and Travis Knight; How to Train Your Dragon 2 - Dean DeBlois and Bonnie Arnold; The Tale of the Princess Kaguya - Isao Takahata and Yoshiaki Nishimura	Force Majeure (Sweden) in Swedish - Directed by Ruben Ostlund: Ida (Poland) in Polish - Directed by Pawel Pawlikowski; Mommy (Canada) in French - Directed by Xavier Dolan; The Raid 2 (Indonesia) in Indonesian - Directed by Gareth Evans; Two Days, One Night (France) in French - Directed by Luca Dardenne and Jean-Pierre Dardenne
Best Documentary Film	Best Original Score
Life Itself - Steve James, Zak Piper and Garrett Basch: Citizenfour - Laura Poitras, Mathilde Bonnefoy and Dirk Wilutzky; Jodorowsky's Dune - Frank Pavich, Stephen Scarlata and Travis Stevens; Last Days in Vietnam - Rory Kennedy and Keven McAlester; The Overnighters - Jesse Moss and Amanda McBaine	Under the Skin – Mica Levi: Birdman – Antonio Sánchez; The Grand Budapest Hotel – Alexandre Desplat; The Imitation Game – Alexandre Desplat; Interstellar – Hans Zimmer
Best Production Design	Best Editing
The Grand Budapest Hotel - Production Design: Adam Stockhausen; Set Decoration: Anna Pinnock: Interstellar - Production Design: Nathan Crowley; Set Decoration: Gary Fettis; Into The Woods - Production Design: Dennis Gassner; Set Decoration: Anna Pinnock; Only Lovers Left Alive - Production Design: Anja Fromm; Set Decoration: Christiane Krumwiede and Malte Nitsche; Snowpiercer - Production Design: Stefan Kovacik; Set Decoration: Beatrice Brentnerova	Whiplash – Tom Cross: Birdman – Douglas Crise and Stephen Mirrione; Boyhood – Sandra Adair; Gone Girl – Kirk Baxter; The Grand Budapest Hotel – Barney Pilling
Best Cinematography	
Birdman – Emmanuel Lubezki and The Grand Budapest Hotel – Robert Yeoman: Ida – Ryszard Lenczewski and Lukasz Zal; Inherent Vice – Robert Elswit; Interstellar – Hoyte van Hoytema
Most Promising Filmmaker	Most Promising Performer
Damien Chazelle – Whiplash: Dan Gilroy – Nightcrawler; Jennifer Kent – The Babadook; Jeremy Saulnier – Blue Ruin; Justin Simien – Dear White People	Jack O'Connell – Starred Up as Eric Love and Unbroken as Louis "Louie" Zamperini: Ellar Coltrane – Boyhood as Mason Evans, Jr.; Gugu Mbatha-Raw – Belle as Dido Elizabeth Belle and Beyond the Lights as Noni Jean; Tony Revolori – The Grand Budapest Hotel as Zero Moustafa; Jenny Slate – Obvious Child as Donna Stern; Agata Trzebuchowska – Ida as Anna/Ida Lebenstein

== Awards breakdown ==
The following films received multiple nominations:

Nominations	Film
9	Birdman or (The Unexpected Virtue of Ignorance)
8	The Grand Budapest Hotel
7	Boyhood
4	Whiplash
4	Gone Girl
4	Interstellar
4	Ida
4	Under the Skin
3	Wild
3	The Imitation Game
3	Inherent Vice
2	Two Days, One Night
2	Nightcrawler

The following films received multiple wins:

Wins	Film
3	Boyhood
3	Whiplash
2	Birdman or (The Unexpected Virtue of Ignorance)
2	The Grand Budapest Hotel
