= Agata Trzebuchowska =

Polish screenwriter and film director (born 1992)

- Born: 12 April 1992 (age 34); Poland
- Education: University of Warsaw
- Occupations: Filmmaker; journalist; actress
- Years active: 2013–present

Agata Trzebuchowska (Polish pronunciation: [aˈgata tʂɛbuˈxɔfska]; born 12 April 1992) is a Polish screenwriter, film director and actress. She debuted in the film industry playing the title role in the 2013 film Ida for which she was nominated for many festival and industry awards. She works as a journalist for Przekrój.

== Discovery ==
Ida director Paweł Pawlikowski was having trouble finding an actress to play his title character, so he put out word to the Warsaw film community to be on the lookout for talent. Trzebuchowska was spotted by a friend of Pawlikowski, Agnieszka Szumowska, sitting in a cafe reading a book. Trzebuchowska had no acting experience or plans to pursue an acting career, but agreed to meet with Pawlikowski because she was a fan of his 2004 film My Summer of Love.

== Filmography ==
- 2013: Ida as Ida
- 2016: Heat (director, screenwriter)
- 2018: The Kindler and The Virgin in The Field Guide to Evil (assistant director)
- 2019: Vacancy (director, screenwriter)
- 2020: Never Gonna Snow Again as woman at the concert (cameo)
- 2022: Performance as Jadzia (short)
- 2025: Erupcja as Ula

== Awards and nominations ==
Work	Award	Category	Result	Ref(s)
Ida	38th Gdynia Polish Film Festival	Rising Elle Star Award	Won	
Ida	2nd Film Acting Festival in Wrocław	Best Actress	Nominated	
Ida	5th Les Arcs Film Festival	Best Actress Prize	Won	
Ida	21st Prowincjonalia Festival of the Film Art	Jańcio Wodnik Award for Best Actress	Won	
Ida	16th Polish Academy Film Awards	Discovery of the Year	Nominated	
Ida	9th TVP Kultura Guarantee of Culture Award	Award in Film Category for Actress Duo	Nominated	
Ida	5th Avvantura Film Forum Zadar	Best Actress Prize	Won	
Ida	27th European Film Awards	Best Actress	Nominated	
Ida	27th Chicago Film Critics Association Awards	Most Promising Performer	Nominated	
