= Last Resort (2000 film) =

- Directed by: Paweł Pawlikowski
- Written by: Rowan Joffé; Paweł Pawlikowski
- Produced by: Ruth Caleb
- Starring: Dina Korzun; Artyom Strelnikov; Paddy Considine
- Cinematography: Ryszard Lenczewski
- Edited by: David Charap
- Music by: Max de Wardener
- Production company: BBC Films
- Distributed by: TSG Pictures
- Release dates: 22 August 2000 (EIFF); 23 February 2001 (USA); 16 March 2001 (UK)
- Running time: 77 minutes
- Country: United Kingdom
- Languages: English; Russian
- Box office: $ 79,238

Last Resort is a 2000 British drama film directed by Paweł Pawlikowski in his feature film debut, and starring Dina Korzun, Artyom Strelnikov, and Paddy Considine. The film concerns a Russian immigrant and her son who become stranded in a small English seaside town when her British fiancé does not show up as planned.

The film had its world premiere at the Edinburgh International Film Festival on 22 August 2000 and played at various film festivals to critical acclaim. Pawlikowski won a BAFTA Award, the Carl Foreman Award for Most Promising Newcomer in British Film; and the FIPRESCI Prize at the London Film Festival.

== Plot ==
Tanya, a young Russian woman, arrives with her 10-year-old son Artyom in London, expecting to be met by her fiancé Mark. When he does not arrive, Tanya panics and claims political asylum, resulting in her and her son being confined to the small seaside town of Stonehaven while their claim is considered, a process she is told could take up to a year. Stonehaven, a former resort town, has been converted into a ''designated holding area'' for undocumented immigrants. Tanya and Artyom are placed in a shabby apartment building that overlooks an abandoned amusement park. The area is patrolled by officers who make sure that refugees don't escape. Tanya, who illustrated children's books in Russia, carries a framed illustration she made amongst her belongings.

Tanya is propositioned by Les, an Internet pornographer, to participate in webcam porn videos. Though Tanya is initially wary of the idea, she decides to take up Les' offer when she is desperate for money. As she dresses up in one of the costumes Les gives her and crawls onto the bed, she starts crying and cannot follow through with the video, ultimately leaving. She finds other ways of making money, such as donating blood. Using the holding area's one operating payphone, she is finally able to make contact with Mark, but he breaks up with her.

Tanya attempts to withdraw her claim for asylum and tells the council officers she wants to go back to Russia, but she is told the review of her petition could still take months. Alfie, a former boxer who manages the local amusement arcade, takes sympathy in Tanya's plight, helping her with using the phone line and bringing necessities for her and Artyom. Artyom bonds with Alfie and the two repaint the drab flat he shares with his mother. Though Tanya does not want to get her heart broken again, she enters into a relationship with Alfie. Alfie reveals how he came to end up in Stonehaven; after doing prison time for a fight he got into, he felt he had nothing else to go back to, saying the town is full of "fuckups" like him. Tanya gets choked up when she admits that she's been married and divorced twice previously, crying that it is bad for her and Artyom, but Alfie comforts her. Artyom soon falls in with a group of tough kids who drink, smoke, and engage in petty theft. One day, Les goes to see Tanya at her flat and pays her for the first video attempt, promising more money if she returns and completes the video. Alfie hears through the door and inquires about what business Les is seeking with Tanya, but she denies any involvement.

Later, Alfie angrily walks into Les' home and interrupts a webcam video he is filming, destroying his camera and the furniture. Alfie comes to get Tanya and Artyom, saying he is going to get them out of Stonehaven. The three of them hide in a small, abandoned sailboat on the beach; when the water rises, they sail away and manage to evade the security guards. Alfie, as well as Artyom, want Tanya to stay in England, but she reasons she has to go back to start a new life. Alfie finds a truck for Tanya and Artyom that will take them to the airport. After embracing, Tanya and Alfie say they'll remember each other. Tanya leaves Alfie with the framed illustration as a gift.

== Cast ==
- Dina Korzun as Tanya
- Paddy Considine as Alfie
- Artyom Strelnikov as Artyom
- Lindsay Honey as Les
- Perry Benson as Immigration Officer
- Katie Drinkwater as Katie
- Dave Bean as Frank
- Adrian Scarborough as Council Official
- David Auker as second Council Official
- Bruce Byron as Police Officer

== Production ==
Margate, in the Thanet District of Kent, doubled as the fictional seaside town of Stonehaven, and was the setting for the majority of the film.

== Reception ==
=== Critical response ===
The film was met with widespread critical acclaim. On review aggregate site Rotten Tomatoes, the film has an approval rating of 94% based on 72 critics' reviews. The site's consensus reads, "Critics are raving about Last Resort, saying it's a convincing, touching tale. Particularly impressive is the lack of script during the film's shoot." On Metacritic, the film has a score of 80 based on 21 reviews.

A.O. Scott of The New York Times wrote though the story "dwells on sorrowful circumstances and illuminates a grim corner of contemporary reality, [the film] is far from depressing. Mr. Pawlikowski, most of whose previous films have been documentaries, balances the harsh naturalism his story demands with an almost romantic sense of visual beauty." He added "the thoughtful stylishness of Mr. Pawlikowski's direction doesn't cheapen or aestheticize Tanya's plight but rather extends to her the dignity and compassion that only art can confer". Scott also singled out Paddy Considine's performance, saying it "gives the film a comic spark and a glow of warmth. Alfie's casual cynicism and underlying decency slowly break down Tanya's defenses, and the audience's, too."

Roger Ebert gave the film three out of four, and commented, "Dina Korzun's performance holds our interest because she bases every scene on the fact that her character is a stranger in a strange land with no money and a son to protect." He commended the ending, noting "how it concludes its emotional journey without pretending the underlying story is over".

Kenneth Turan of the Los Angeles Times described the film as "Spare yet unsparing, emotionally affecting without even a hint of excess, it’s an honest, haunting look at the connection between a pair of lonely people who wonder where they belong."

=== Box office ===
The film opened in the United States on 23 February 2001 in 14 theatres and grossed $37,283. It opened in the United Kingdom on 16 March 2001 in 7 theatres and grossed £19,478 ($27,758). Overall, it grossed $79,238 worldwide.

=== Awards ===
- BAFTA Awards
  - Outstanding Debut by a British Writer, Director or Producer (Pawel Pawlikowski)
- Bratislava International Film Festival
  - Best Actress (Dina Korzun)
- Edinburgh International Film Festival
  - Best New British Feature
- Gijón International Film Festival
  - Best Actress (Dina Korzun)
  - Best Feature (Pawel Pawlikowski)
- London Film Festival
  - FIPRESCI Prize - Special Mention
- Thessaloniki Film Festival
  - Best Actor (Paddy Considine)
  - Best Actress (Dina Korzun)
  - FIRESCI Prize - International Competition (Pawel Pawlikowski)
  - Golden Alexander Award (Pawel Pawlikowski)
