= Ida (film) =

2013 film by Paweł Pawlikowski

- Polish theatrical release poster
- Directed by: Paweł Pawlikowski
- Written by: Paweł Pawlikowski; Rebecca Lenkiewicz
- Produced by: Eric Abraham; Piotr Dzięcioł; Ewa Puszczyńska
- Starring: Agata Kulesza; Agata Trzebuchowska; Dawid Ogrodnik
- Cinematography: Łukasz Żal; Ryszard Lenczewski
- Edited by: Jarosław Kamiński
- Music by: Kristian Eidnes Andersen
- Production companies: Polish Film Institute; Canal+ Polska; Danish Film Institute; Eurimages; Opus Film
- Distributed by: Solopan (Poland); Memento Films (France); Artificial Eye (UK)
- Release dates: 7 September 2013 (TIFF); 11 September 2013 (Poland)
- Running time: 82 minutes
- Countries: Poland; Denmark; France; United Kingdom
- Languages: Polish; French; Latin
- Budget: $2.6 million
- Box office: $15.3 million

Ida (Polish: [ˈida]) is a 2013 drama film directed by Paweł Pawlikowski and written by Pawlikowski and Rebecca Lenkiewicz. Set in Poland in 1962, it follows a young woman on the verge of taking vows as a Catholic nun. Orphaned as an infant during the German occupation of World War II, she must meet her aunt, a former Communist state prosecutor and only surviving relative, who tells her that her parents were Jewish. The two women embark on a road trip into the Polish countryside to learn the fate of their relatives.

Hailed as a "compact masterpiece" and an "eerily beautiful road movie", the film has also been said to "contain a cosmos of guilt, violence and pain", even if certain historical events (German occupation of Poland, the Holocaust and Stalinism) remain unsaid: "none of this is stated, but all of it is built, so to speak, into the atmosphere: the country feels dead, the population sparse".

Ida won the 2015 Academy Award for Best Foreign Language Film, becoming the first Polish film to do so. It had earlier been selected as Best Film of 2014 by the European Film Academy and as Best Film Not in the English Language of 2014 by the British Academy of Film and Television Arts (BAFTA). In 2016, the film was named as the 55th best film of the 21st century, from a poll of 177 film critics from around the world.

== Plot ==
In the 1960s Poland, Anna, a young novice nun, is told by her prioress that she must visit Wanda Gruz, her aunt and only surviving relative, before she takes her vows. Anna travels to Warsaw to see Wanda, a chain-smoking, hard-drinking, sexually promiscuous state prosecutor and former communist resistance fighter. Wanda reveals that Anna's actual name is Ida Lebenstein, and that she was raised in a convent after her Jewish parents were murdered late in the German occupation during World War II. Ida asks to see the graves of her parents; Wanda replies that it is unknown where or if they were buried. They embark on a road trip to visit the village where her parents lived.

Wanda urges Ida to try worldly sins and pleasures before taking her vows. On the way to their hotel, Wanda picks up a hitchhiker, Lis, an alto saxophone player who is performing a gig in the same town. Wanda tries to set Ida and Lis up but Ida is reluctant; eventually she relents and visits the band after they've wrapped up for the night. Lis is drawn to Ida and the two talk before she leaves to rejoin her aunt, who is passed out drunk in their room.

She takes Ida to the house they used to own, now occupied by a Christian farmer, Feliks Skiba, and his family. During the war, the Skibas had taken over the home and hidden the Lebensteins from the German authorities. Wanda demands that Feliks tell her where his father is. After some searching, the women find him close to death in a hospital; he speaks well of the Lebensteins but says little else. Wanda reveals that she had left her son Tadzio with the Lebensteins while she went to fight in the resistance, and that he presumably died alongside them. Feliks, hoping to spare his father of the guilt, asks them to keep his father out of their search. Instead, he agrees to tell them where the Lebensteins are buried if Ida promises to leave the Skibas alone and give up any claim to the house and land.

Feliks takes the women to the woods and digs up the bones of their family, before admitting that he killed them. He says that because Ida was very small and able to pass for a Christian, he gave her to a convent. As Wanda's small son could not pass, he was killed along with Ida's parents. Wanda and Ida take the bones to their family plot in an abandoned, overgrown Jewish cemetery in Lublin, and bury them.

Wanda and Ida, both profoundly affected by their experience, part ways and return to their previous existences and routines. Wanda continues to drink and engage in meaningless casual sex as she sinks deeper into melancholy, while a thoughtful Ida returns to the convent and starts having second thoughts about taking her vows. Wanda ultimately jumps out of her apartment window to her death. Ida returns to Warsaw and attends Wanda's burial, where she meets Lis again. At Wanda's apartment, she changes out of her novice's habit and into Wanda's stilettos and evening gown, tries smoking and drinking, and then goes to Lis's gig. Lis later teaches her to dance and the two share a kiss.

After the show, Ida and Lis sleep together. Lis suggests they get married, have children, and live "life as usual." The next morning, Ida quietly arises without awakening Lis, dons her habit again, and leaves, presumably to return to the convent and take her vows.

== Cast ==
- Agata Kulesza as Wanda Gruz
- Agata Trzebuchowska as Anna / Ida Lebenstein
- Dawid Ogrodnik as Lis
- Adam Szyszkowski as Feliks Skiba
- Jerzy Trela as Szymon Skiba
- Joanna Kulig as a singer
- Artur Janusiak as soldier

== Production ==
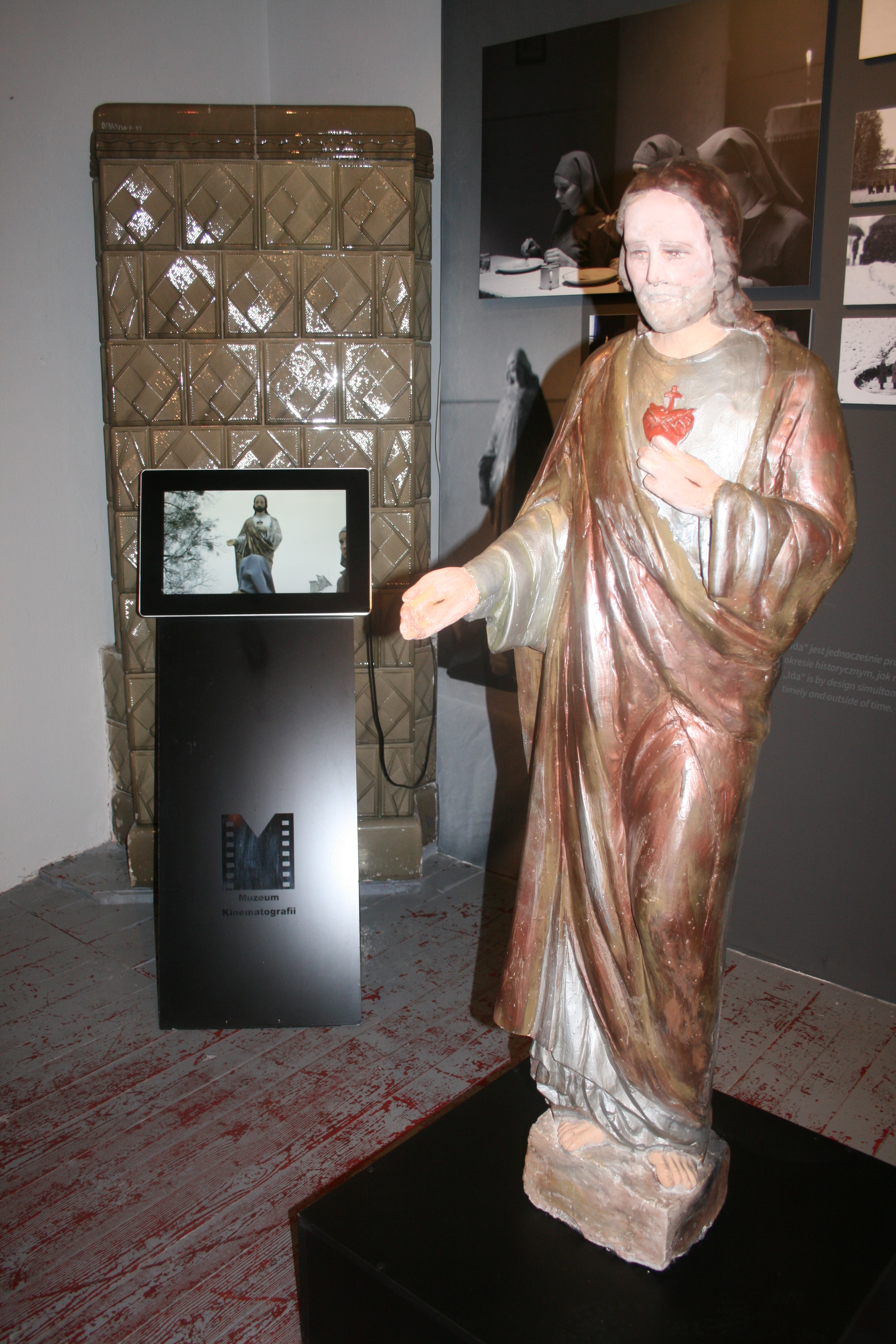
The statue of Christ from the film with displays showing how the sequences were shot.

The director of Ida, Paweł Pawlikowski, was born in Poland and lived his first fourteen years there. In 1971 his mother abruptly emigrated with him to England, where he ultimately became a prominent filmmaker. Ida is his first Polish film; in an interview he said that the film "is an attempt to recover the Poland of my childhood, among many things". Ida was filmed in Poland with a cast and crew that was drawn primarily from the Polish film industry. The film received crucial early funding from the Polish Film Institute based on a screenplay by Pawlikowski and Rebecca Lenkiewicz, who is an English playwright. Once the support from the Polish Film Institute had been secured, producer Eric Abraham underwrote production of the film.

The first version of the screenplay was written in English by Lenkiewicz and Pawlikowski, when it had the working title Sister of Mercy. Pawlikowski then translated the screenplay into Polish and further adapted it for filming.

The character of Wanda Gruz was inspired by Helena Wolińska-Brus, a Jewish-Polish lawyer who was a prosecutor in Stalinist Poland and participated in multiple show trials. Pawlikowski had met Wolińska-Brus while studying at the University of Oxford, where her husband Włodzimierz Brus worked as a professor; at the time, Pawlikowski was unaware of her past. After learning years later that Wolińska-Brus worked for the Stalinist regime and that the Polish government was demanding her extradition, Pawlikowski expressed an interest in making a documentary about her life, which Włodzimierz Brus allegedly refused on his wife's behalf. Pawlikowski described Wolińska-Brus as an "archetype" for Wanda Gruz.

Pawlikowski had difficulty in casting the role of Anna/Ida. After he'd interviewed more than 400 actresses, Agata Trzebuchowska was discovered by a friend of Pawlikowski's, who saw her sitting in a cafe in Warsaw reading a book. She had no acting experience or plans to pursue an acting career. She agreed to meet with Pawlikowski because she was a fan of his film My Summer of Love (2004).

Łukasz Żal and Ryszard Lenczewski are credited as the cinematographers. Lenczewski has been the cinematographer for Pawlikowski's feature films since Last Resort (2000); unlike Pawlikowski, Lenczewski had worked in Poland as well as England prior to Ida. Ida is filmed in black and white, and uses the now uncommon 4:3 aspect ratio. When Pawlikowski told the film's producers of these decisions about filming, they reportedly commented, "Paul, you are no longer a student, don't be silly." Lenczewski has commented that, "We chose black and white and the 1.33 frame because it was evocative of Polish films of that era, the early 1960s. We designed the unusual compositions to make the audience feel uncertain, to watch in a different way." The original plan had been for Żal to assist Lenczewski. Lenczewski became ill, and Żal took over the project.

Production on Ida was interrupted mid-filming by an early snowstorm. Pawlikowski took advantage of the two-week hiatus to refine the script, find new locations, and rehearse. He credits the break for "making the film cohere ... in a certain, particular way."

Ida was edited by Jarosław Kamiński, a veteran of Polish cinema. Pawlikowski's previous English language feature films were edited by David Charap. Except the final scene of the film, there is no background musical score; as Dana Stevens explains, "the soundtrack contains no extradiegetic music—that is, music the characters aren't listening to themselves—but all the music that's there is significant and carefully chosen, from Wanda's treasured collection of classical LPs to the tinny Polish pop that plays on the car radio as the women drive toward their grim destination." As for the final scene, Pawlikowski has said, "The only piece of music that is non-ambient (from outside the world of the film – that is not on the radio or played by a band) is the piece of Bach at the end. I was a bit desperate with the final scene, and I tried it out in the mix. It's in a minor key, but it seems serene and to recognize the world and its complexities."

== Release ==
=== Theatrical ===
After its initial festival screenings, Ida premiered in Poland on 25 October 2013, followed by releases in various other countries in the subsequent months, including France, Spain, Italy, and New Zealand. In the United States, the film had its theatrical release on 2 May 2014.

Danish company Fandango Portobello managed the global distribution of "Ida." By July 2014, the film had secured sales in more than 30 countries. On 17 July 2014, the film saw theatrical releases in the Czech Republic and Portugal.

=== Home media ===
Ida has been released to DVD in both region 1 and region 2 with English subtitles. It has also been released with subtitles in several other languages. In December 2014 the film was awarded the Lux Prize by the European Parliament; this prize supports subtitling of films into all of the 23 official languages of the European Union.

== Critical reception ==
Ida received widespread acclaim, with critics praising its writing and cinematography. On the review aggregator website Rotten Tomatoes, the film has an approval rating of 96%, based on 168 critic reviews, with an average rating of 8.36/10. The website's critical consensus reads, "Empathetically written, splendidly acted, and beautifully photographed, Ida finds director Pawel Pawlikowski revisiting his roots to powerful effect." Metacritic, which uses a weighted average, assigned a score of 91 out of 100, based on 35 reviews, indicating "universal acclaim".

A. O. Scott of The New York Times wrote that "with breathtaking concision and clarity—80 minutes of austere, carefully framed black and white—Mr. Pawlikowski penetrates the darkest, thorniest thickets of Polish history, reckoning with the crimes of Stalinism and the Holocaust." He concluded that "Mr. Pawlikowski has made one of the finest European films (and one of the most insightful films about Europe, past and present) in recent memory." David Denby of The New Yorker called Ida a "compact masterpiece", and he discussed the film's reticence concerning the history in which it is embedded: "Between 1939 and 1945, Poland lost a fifth of its population, including three million Jews. In the two years after the war, Communists took over the government under the eyes of the Red Army and the Soviet secret police, the N.K.V.D.. Many Poles who were prominent in resisting the Nazis were accused of preposterous crimes; the independent-minded were shot or hanged. In the movie, none of this is stated, but all of it is built, so to speak, into the atmosphere ..." Denby considered Ida to be "by far the best movie of the year". Variety's Peter Debruge was more reserved about the film's success, stating that "...dialing things back as much as this film does risks losing the vast majority of viewers along the way, offering an intellectual exercise in lieu of an emotional experience to all but the most rarefied cineastes."

Agata Trzebuchowska and Agata Kulesza both received favorable reviews for their performances from several critics. Peter Bradshaw wrote in The Guardian that "Agata Trzebuchowska is tremendously mysterious as a 17-year-old novitiate in a remote convent: she has the impassivity and inscrutability of youth." Riva Reardon wrote, "In her debut role, the actress masterfully negotiates the film's challenging subtlety, offering glimpses into her character with only a slight movement of the corner of her mouth or by simply shifting her uncanny black eyes." David Denby noted that "Wanda tells her of her past in brief fragments, and Kulesza does more with those fragments—adding a gesture, a pause—than anyone since Greta Garbo, who always implied much more than she said." Dana Stevens wrote that "As played, stupendously, by the veteran Polish TV, stage, and film actress Agata Kulesza, Wanda is a vortex of a character, as fascinating to spend time with as she is bottomlessly sad."

=== Controversy and criticism ===
The film was criticized by Polish nationalists for its perspective on Christian-Jewish relations in Poland. A letter of complaint was sent by the right-wing Polish Anti-Defamation League to the Polish Film Institute, which provided significant funding for the film. A petition calling for the addition of explanatory title cards was signed by more than 40,000 Poles; the film does not explicitly note that thousands of Poles were executed by the German occupiers for hiding or helping Jewish Poles. Eric Abraham, one of the producers of Ida, responded: "Are they really suggesting that all films loosely based on historical events should come with contextual captions? Tell that to Mr. Stone and Mr. Spielberg and Mr. von Donnersmarck", referring to the directors of JFK, Lincoln, and The Lives of Others.

Conversely, others have argued that the character of Wanda Gruz, who participated in the persecution of those who threatened the Soviet-sponsored postwar regime, perpetuates a stereotype about Polish Jews as collaborators with the regime.

=== Influences ===
Several critics have discerned possible influences on Ida from Carl Theodor Dreyer's films and from Robert Bresson's. Thus David Thomson writes enthusiastically that seeing Ida is "like seeing Carl Dreyer's The Passion of Joan of Arc for the first time" and that the relationship of Ida and her aunt Wanda is "worthy of the Bresson of Diary of a Country Priest." The Passion of Joan of Arc is a silent 1928 film that is noted as one of the greatest films. M. Leary has expanded on the influence on Ida: "The actress that plays Ida was apparently noticed at a cafe and drafted in as a blank canvas for this character, who becomes a mute witness in the film to the terror of Jewish genocide and the Soviet aftermath. She is a bit like Dreyer's Joan in that her character is more about a violent march of history than her Catholic subtext." Dana Stevens writes that Ida is "set in the early 1960s, and its stylistic austerity and interest in theological questions often recall the work of Robert Bresson (though Pawlikowski lacks—I think—Bresson's deeply held faith in salvation)."

Other critics have emphasized stylistic similarities to New Wave films such as the definitive 1959 French film The 400 Blows, directed by François Truffaut, and the 1960 Polish film Innocent Sorcerers, directed by Andrzej Wajda. There are also similarities with Luis Buñuel's Viridiana (1961).

== Box office ==
Ida grossed $3,827,060 in the United States and $333,714 in Poland, with an additional $2,858,992 in other territories for a total of $11,156,836 worldwide. The film has been described as a "crossover hit", especially for a foreign language film.

In the United States, the film ran for 609 days, equivalent to 87 weeks, with a peak presence in 137 theaters. In its opening weekend, the film made $55,438 across three theaters, achieving a per-theater average of $18,479. During its widest release, the per-theater average dropped to $2,979.

During its theatrical run in Poland, Ida was shown in theaters for 68 days, equivalent to nine weeks. At its peak, the film was screened in 93 theaters. In its opening weekend, the film made $149,661 across 75 theaters, achieving a per-theater average of $1,978. During its widest release, the per-theater average dropped to $918.

Earning nearly as much as it did in the United States, the film grossed $3,192,706 in France, where it reached its peak presence in 270 theaters and ran for 46 weeks. Nearly 500,000 people watched the film, making it one of the most successful Polish-language films ever screened in the country. In the United Kingdom, it earned $600,324, with a peak presence in 37 theaters and a run time of 13 weeks. In Argentina, the film grossed $89,370 over 29 weeks, and in New Zealand, it made $248,173 after a 32-week theatrical run.

== Accolades ==
Ida was screened in the Special Presentation section at the 2013 Toronto International Film Festival where it won the FIPRESCI Special Presentations award. Among other festivals Ida won Best Film at Gdynia, Warsaw, London, Bydgoszcz, Minsk, Gijón, Wiesbaden, Kraków. The film is also widely recognized for Agata Kulesza's and Agata Trzebuchowska's performances, and for the cinematography by Ryszard Lenczewski and Łukasz Żal.

The film was honoured by the national Polish Film Academy as the Best Film of 2013, winning in three other categories, and nominated in seven additional categories. The European Film Academy nominated the film in seven categories, winning 5, including Best European Film and People's Choice Award, at the 27th European Film Awards. The Spanish Academy of Arts and Cinematographic Sciences named Ida as Best European Film at the 29th Goya Awards. At the 68th British Academy Film Awards the film won the Award for Best Film Not in the English Language.

At the 87th Academy Awards, it won the award for Best Foreign Language Film, and was also nominated for Best Cinematography.

The film has received a nomination from Hollywood Foreign Press Association at the 72nd Golden Globe Awards for Best Foreign Language Film, and from International Press Academy at the 19th Satellite Awards for Best Foreign Language Film category.

It has been also recognised by the Swedish Film Institute (50th Guldbagge Awards), the Danish Film Academy (31st Robert Awards), the French Academy of Arts and Technics of Cinema (40th César Awards), the Catalan Academy of Cinema (7th Gaudí Awards). The film was also awarded by the European Parliament with the Lux Prize.

== See also ==
- List of submissions to the 87th Academy Awards for Best Foreign Language Film
- List of Polish submissions for the Academy Award for Best Foreign Language Film
- Reverse (2009) – Polish film portraying Communist Poland in the 1950s and 1960s
- Aftermath (2012) – Polish thriller about reckoning with the destruction of a community of Polish Jews during World War II
