= Ryszard Lenczewski =

Polish cinematographer (1948–2026)

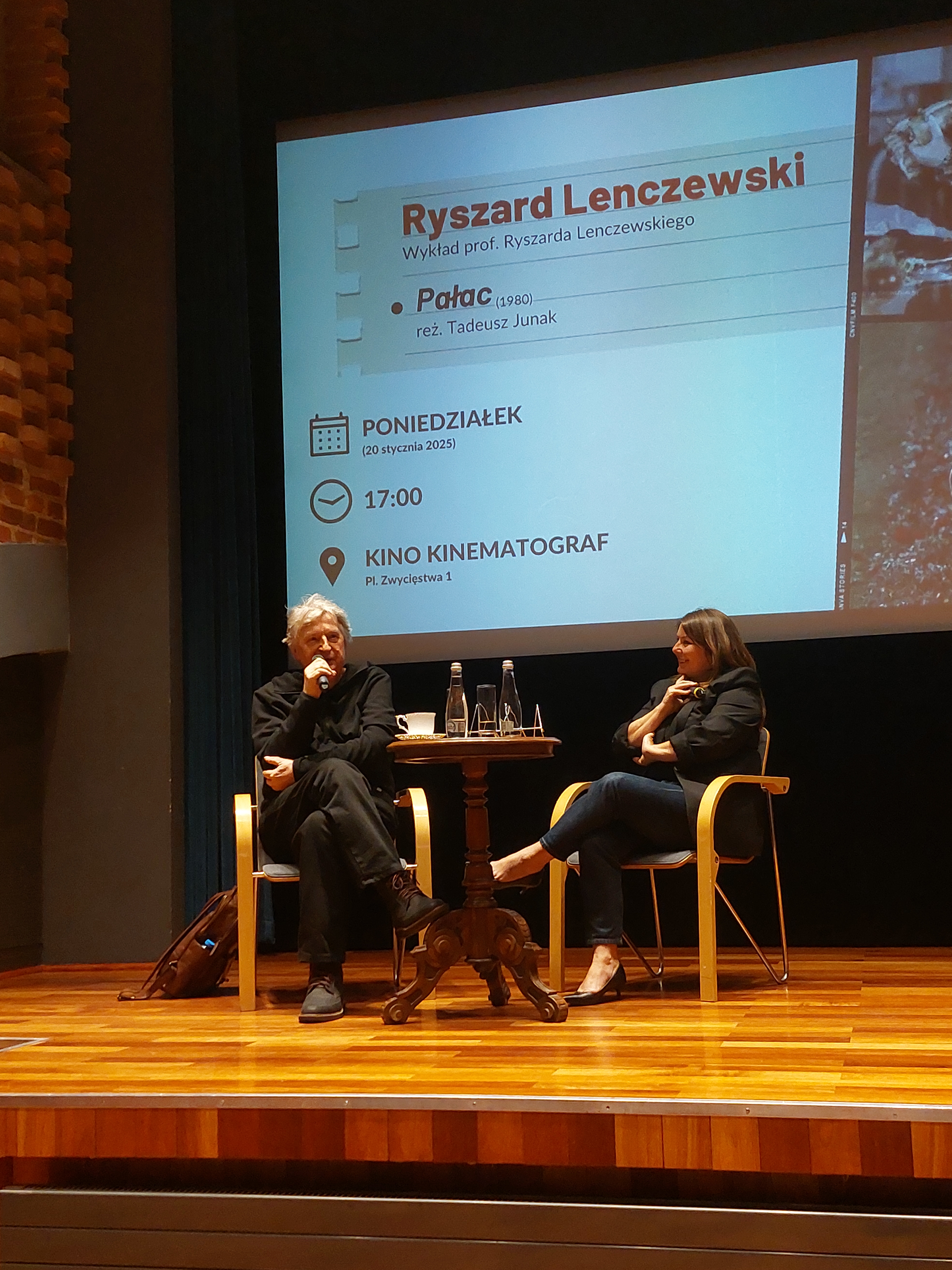
- Born: 5 June 1948; Miłków, Lower Silesian Voivodeship, Poland
- Died: 25 September 2026 (aged 78)
- Occupation: Cinematographer
- Years active: 1973–2026

Ryszard Lenczewski (Polish pronunciation: [ˈrɨʂard lɛnˈtʂɛfskʲi]; 5 June 1948 – 25 September 2026) was a Polish film and television cinematographer with more than 30 feature film credits. Lenczewski was the cinematographer for four of director Paweł Pawlikowski's feature films. His work (with Łukasz Żal) on Pawlikowski's Ida (2014) has been widely recognized, garnering nominations for both the Academy Award and the BAFTA Award.

== Life and career ==
In 1974 he graduated from the Cinematography Department of the National Film School in Łódź. In 2005 he obtained a postdoctoral degree in film art, and on 7 October 2010 he was awarded the title of professor. From 2008 to 2014 he was the deputy dean of the Cinematography Department at the National Film School in Łódź. He was a member of the British Academy of Film and Television Arts, the European Film Academy and from 2015, the American Academy of Motion Picture Arts and Sciences.

Lenczewski began working in the film industry as a cinematographer for school etudes and documentaries. In later years he collaborated with such directors as Bogdan Dziworski, Jerzy Domaradzki, Lech Majewski, Janusz Morgenstern, Tadeusz Junak, Laco Adamik, Andrzej Barański, Juliusz Machulski, Izabella Cywińska, Zbigniew Kamiński, Wiesław Saniewski, Grzegorz Królikiewicz, Ryszard Ber, Krzysztof Zanussi, Jacek Bromski, John Crowley, Pawel Pawlikowski, Uri Barbash, Kenneth Lonergan, Rowan Joffé, Joe Wright, Charles Beeson and others.

In 1980 he received an award at the Polish Feature Film Festival in Gdańsk for cinematography for the film Pałac. In 1997 he was awarded a BAFTA Cymru for Wojenna narzeczona, and in 2001 he was nominated for the BAFTA Film Awards for the miniseries Anna Karenina. My Summer of Love brought him the nomination for the European Film Award. In 2004 he received the TV Award of the British Academy in the category of photography and lighting for the movie Charles II: The Power and the Passion.

In 2013, he worked with Łukasz Żal on the award-winning film Ida. The authors of the photographs for this production have been honored, among others Oscar nominations in the category "Best photos" and the British Film Academy Award, as well as the European Film Award, the prize for cinematography at the Gdynia Film Festival, prizes at festivals in Minsk and Bucharest, and Golden Frog at Camerimage. He also received the Spotlight Award from the American Society of Cinematographers.

He was decorated with the Medal for Merit to Culture – Gloria Artis in 2013.

Lenczewski was a member of the American Film Academy from 2015 until his death in 2026. In the same year he received the "Golden Camera 300" award for lifetime achievement at the International Festival of Cinematographers in Bitola.

Lenczewski died on 25 September 2026, at the age of 78.

== Awards (selection) ==
This list of Lenczewski's nominations and awards is based on the listing at the Internet Movie Database.

=== Ida ===
- 87th Academy Awards in the category of Best Cinematography. Nomination shared with Łukasz Żal.
- European Film Award for Best Cinematographer

=== Charles II: The Power & the Passion ===
- BAFTA TV Award, Best Photography and Lighting

=== My Summer of Love ===
- European Film Award for Best Cinematographer, nomination
