= Paweł Pawlikowski =

Polish filmmaker (born 1957)

- Pawlikowski in 2026
- Born: Paweł Aleksander Pawlikowski; 15 September 1957 (age 69); Warsaw, Poland
- Education: Oxford University
- Occupation: Filmmaker
- Years active: 1987–present
- Spouses: Irina Pawlikowska (died 2006) Małgosia Bela (m. 2017)
- Children: 2
- Awards: Full list

Paweł Aleksander Pawlikowski (Polish: [ˈpavɛw alɛˈksandɛr pavliˈkɔfskʲi]; born 15 September 1957) is a Polish filmmaker. He garnered early praise for a string of documentaries in the 1990s and for his award-winning feature films of the 2000s, Last Resort (2000) and My Summer of Love (2004).

His success continued into the 2010s with Ida (2013), which won the Academy Award for Best International Feature Film representing Poland. For Cold War (2018), he won the Best Director prize at the Cannes and was nominated for the Academy Award for Best Director. He won his second Best Director prize at Cannes for Fatherland (2026).

== Early life and education ==
Pawel Aleksander Pawlikowski was born in Warsaw, Poland, to his father Wiktor, who was a doctor and Zula, his mother, who started as a ballet dancer and later became an English literature professor at the University of Warsaw. In his late teens, he learned that his paternal grandmother was Jewish and had been killed in Auschwitz concentration camp.

At the age of 14, he left Poland with his mother for London during the Cold War. What he thought was a holiday turned out to be a permanent exile. A year later he moved to West Germany, before finally settling in Britain again by 1977. He studied literature and philosophy at Wolfson College, Oxford, Oxford University.

== Career ==
=== 20th century: Early works ===
In the late 1980s and 1990s, Pawlikowski was best known for his documentaries, whose blend of lyricism and irony won him many fans and awards around the world. From Moscow to Pietushki was a poetic journey into the world of the Russian cult writer Venedikt Erofeev, for which he won an Emmy, an RTS award, a Prix Italia and other awards. The multi-award-winning Dostoevsky's Travels was a tragi-comic road movie in which a St Petersburg tram driver and the only living descendant of Fyodor Dostoevsky, travels rough around Western Europe haunting high-minded humanists, aristocrats, monarchists and the Baden-Baden casino in his quest to raise money to buy a secondhand Mercedes.

Pawlikowski's most original and formally successful film was Serbian Epics (1992), made at the height of the Bosnian War. The oblique, ironic, imagistic, at times almost hypnotic study of epic Serbian poetry, with exclusive footage of Radovan Karadžić and General Ratko Mladić, aroused a storm of controversy and incomprehension at the time, but has now secured it something of a cult status. The absurdist Tripping with Zhirinovsky, a surreal boat journey down the Volga with controversial Russian politician Vladimir Zhirinovsky, won Pawlikowski the Grierson Award for the Best British Documentary in 1995. Pawlikowski's transition to fiction occurred in 1998 with a small 50-minute hybrid film Twockers, a lyrical and gritty love story set on a sink estate in Yorkshire, which he co-wrote and co-directed with Ian Duncan.

=== 2000s ===
In 2000 he wrote and directed Last Resort starring Dina Korzun and Paddy Considine, which won the BAFTA Award for Outstanding British Debut, the Michael Powell Award for Best British Film at Edinburgh and many other awards. In 2004 he wrote and directed My Summer of Love starring Emily Blunt and Natalie Press, which won a BAFTA, the Michael Powell Award for Best British Film and many other awards.

In 2006, he filmed about 60% of his adaptation of Magnus Mills' The Restraint of Beasts when the project was halted—his wife had fallen gravely ill and he left to care for her and their children.

=== 2010s ===
In 2011, he wrote and directed a film loosely adapted from Douglas Kennedy's novel The Woman in the Fifth, starring Ethan Hawke and Kristin Scott Thomas.

On 19 October 2013, his film Ida (starring Agata Kulesza) won the Best Film Award at the London Film Festival, on the same night that Anthony Chen, one of his students at the National Film and Television School, won the Sutherland Prize for the Best First Film, for Ilo Ilo. Ida won the 2015 Academy Award for Foreign Language Film on 23 February 2015, the first Polish film to do so. In the same year, he was a member of the jury headed by Alfonso Cuarón at the 72nd Venice International Film Festival.

In 2017, Pawlikowski adapted Emmanuel Carrère's biographical novel Limonov (2011), based on the life of Eduard Limonov, into a screenplay. Pawlikowski planned to direct the film adaptation but revealed in 2020 that he lost interest in the character and abandoned plans to direct. The screenplay was later reworked and directed by Russian filmmaker Kirill Serebrennikov into Limonov: The Ballad (2024).

His sixth feature film, Cold War, earned him the Best Director Award at the 2018 Cannes Film Festival, also marking his first entry at the festival's main competition. It won five awards at the 2018 European Film Awards including Best Film, Best Director and Best Actress. Alongside three nominations at the 91st Academy Awards, Best Foreign Language Film, Best Director and Best Cinematography.

In 2019, he was announced as one of the members of the main competition jury at the Cannes Film Festival.

=== 2020s ===
In October 2022, reports emerged that Pawlikowski's next film, under the working title The Island, was scheduled to begin filming in 2023. The film is inspired by true events and cast Joaquin Phoenix and Rooney Mara as an American couple in the 1930s, who leave behind civilization to live on a deserted island. In May 2023, production for The Island was halted, weeks before filming was set to begin, as a result of the impending 2023 SAG-AFTRA strike. In February 2024, Mara stated that herself, Phoenix, and Pawlikowski are still committed to make the film, but was unsure of when it may be filmed.

In 2026, his period drama Fatherland, about German writer Thomas Mann and his daughter Erika, premiered at the main competition of the 2026 Cannes Film Festival to critical acclaim. He won his second Best Director award for the film, tying with Javier Calvo and Javier Ambrossi for La bola negra.

== Personal life ==
Pawlikowski grew up a Catholic and considers himself one up to this day, but says that he finds the Catholic Church in Great Britain to be easier to grow in faith in than in Poland.

Pawlikowski's first wife, who was Russian, developed a serious illness in 2006 and died several months later. They have a son and a daughter. After his children left for university, Pawlikowski moved to Paris, and later relocated to Warsaw. At the end of 2017, he married Polish model and actress Małgosia Bela.

In addition to his native Polish, he speaks six languages, including German and Russian.

== Filmography ==
=== Feature films ===
Year	Title	Notes
1998	The Stringer	
2000	Last Resort	Co-written with Rowan Joffé
2004	My Summer of Love	Co-written with Michael Wynne
2011	The Woman in the Fifth	
2013	Ida	Co-written with Rebecca Lenkiewicz; Academy Award for Best International Feature Film
2018	Cold War	Co-written with Janusz Głowacki and Piotr Borkowski; Best Director at the 2018 Cannes Film Festival
2026	Fatherland	Co-written with Hendrik Handloegten; Best Director at the 2026 Cannes Film Festival

==== Only screenwriter ====
Year	Title	Notes
2014	Lost in Karastan	Co-written with Ben Hopkins
2024	Limonov: The Ballad	Co-written with Ben Hopkins and Kirill Serebrennikov

=== Short films ===
Year	Title
2025	Muse

=== Documentary works ===
Television

Year	Title	Director	Writer	Producer	Notes
1987	Open Space	Yes	No	No	TV series
1990	From Moscow to Pietushki with Benny Yerofeyev	Yes	Yes	No	TV movie
1991	Dostoevsky's Travels	Yes	No	Yes	TV movie
1992	Serbian Epics	Yes	No	Yes	TV movie
1994	Tripping with Zhirinovsky	Yes	No	Yes	TV movie

Film

Year	Title	Director	Writer	Producer	Notes
1998	Twockers	Yes	Yes	Yes	Co-directed with Ian Duncan

== Awards and nominations ==
Academy Awards

Year	Category	Title	Result
2015	Best International Feature Film	Ida	Accepted
2019	Best Director	Cold War	Nominated

British Academy Film Awards

Year	Category	Title	Result
2001	Outstanding British Film	Last Resort	Nominated
2001	Outstanding Debut by a British Writer, Director or Producer	Last Resort	Won
2005	Outstanding British Film	My Summer of Love	Won
2014	Best Film Not in the English Language	Ida	Accepted
2018	Best Direction	Cold War	Nominated
2018	Best Original Screenplay	Cold War	Nominated

Golden Globe Awards

Year	Category	Title	Result
2015	Best Non-English Language Film	Ida	Nominated

European Film Awards

Year	Category	Title	Result
1992	Best Documentary	Dostoyevsky’s Travels	Special Mention
2001	European Discovery	Last Resort	Nominated
2005	Best Film	My Summer of Love	Nominated
2005	Best Director	My Summer of Love	Nominated
2014	Best Film	Ida	Won
2014	Best Director	Ida	Won
2014	Best Screenwriter	Ida	Won
2014	People's Choice Award	Ida	Won
2018	Best Film	Cold War	Won
2018	Best Director	Cold War	Won
2018	Best Screenwriter	Cold War	Won

Polish Film Awards

Year	Category	Title	Result
2006	Best European Film	My Summer of Love	Won
2014	Best Film	Ida	Won
2014	Best Director	Ida	Won
2014	Best Screenplay	Ida	Nominated
2019	Best Film	Cold War	Won
2019	Best Director	Cold War	Won
2019	Best Screenplay	Cold War	Won

British Independent Film Awards

Year	Category	Title	Result
2000	Best Director	Last Resort	Nominated
2000	Best Screenplay	Last Resort	Nominated
2004	Best Director	My Summer of Love	Nominated
2014	Best Foreign Independent Film	Ida	Nominated
2018	Best Foreign Independent Film	Cold War	Nominated

Film festivals

Year	Award	Category	Title	Result
2013	38th National Polish Film Festival	Golden Lions for Best Film	Ida	Won
2014	30th Seattle International Film Festival	Best Director	Ida	3rd runner-up
2018	71st Cannes Film Festival	Best Director	Cold War	Won
2018	43rd National Polish Film Festival	Golden Lions for Best Film	Cold War	Won
2026	79th Cannes Film Festival	Best Director	Fatherland	Won (Note: Tied with Javier Calvo and Javier Ambrossi for La bola negra)

Critics associations awards

Year	Award	Category	Title	Result	Ref.
2014	9th Dublin Film Critics' Circle Awards	Best Director	Ida	#3	
2014	Indiewire 2014 Year-End Critics Poll	Best Director	Ida	#10	
2019	39th London Film Critics Circle Awards	Best Director	Cold War	Nominated	

Other distinctions

Pawlikowski was made Honorary Associate of London Film School. In 2019, he was awarded the title of an honorary citizen of Warsaw.

== See also ==
- Cinema of Poland
- List of Poles
- List of Academy Award winners and nominees from Poland
