= Bjarne Berg =

Norwegian swimmer and journalist (1950–2010)

Bjarne Berg (6 June 1950 – 9 May 2010) was a Norwegian swimmer, journalist and businessperson. He is best known as news editor of TV 2 and from the companies Vizrt and Hardball.

== Career ==
He grew up in Fana as a son of Christian journalist Arthur Bjarne Berg, and was a journalist in Dagbladet and Bergens Tidende before he was hired in TV 2. He was promoted to news editor in the television channel. He was central in building up the channel's news backbone TV 2 Nyhetene, and also helped build up the Storm Weather Center to support the channel's weather forecasts. He worked in TV 2 from 1992 to 2000.

He later became director of the graphics company Vizrt in 2001. In 2003 he started a cooperation with Vizrt partner Svein Ove Strømmen and Eivind Kåre Lunde, which culminated in the founding of the investment company Hardball. The company invested in association football players, which delivered players to SK Brann. SK Brann won the Norwegian Premier League in 2007. The sporting success waned over the next years. In 2010, at the general assembly, he demanded the resignation of the board.

He was also an active swimmer, and swimming coach and administrator. He set two Norwegian records around 1970; in the 100 metre butterfly in August 1969 with 1.02,3 minutes, and in the 200 metre butterfly in August 1970 with 2.16,6 minutes. He represented the club Bergens SC.

== Death ==
Berg died in May 2010. He was buried from the St John's Church, Bergen. Hardball and Vizrt partner Svein Ove Strømmen died shortly after, in September 2010.
