= Carvey =

Carvey is a surname. Notable people with the surname include:

- Brad Carvey (born 1951), American engineer
- Dana Carvey (born 1955), American stand-up comedian, actor, impressionist, screenwriter, and producer

== See also ==
- Harvey (name)
