= Till There Was You (disambiguation) =

"Till There Was You" is a love song from the 1957 Broadway musical, The Music Man later covered by The Beatles and many others.

Till There Was You could also refer to:

- Till There Was You (1990 film), an Australian film directed by John Seale
- Till There Was You (2003 film), a Filipino film directed by Joyce E. Bernal
- 'Til There Was You, a 1997 film directed by Scott Winant and starring Jeanne Tripplehorn and Dylan McDermott
