= Hardball (company) =

Norwegian investment company

Hardball is a Norwegian investment company founded in 2004 to finance player transfers for the association football team Brann from Bergen, Norway. Former news editor at Norwegian TV 2 and managing director of software company Vizrt, Bjarne Berg, fronted Hardball and was one of several members of the investors group until his death in 2010.

Eivind Kåre Lunde is the company's Managing Director.

When a Hardball financed player is sold, Hardball is to have their investment back after expenses are withdrawn. Any profits are to be divided 50-50 between Hardball and Brann. Hardball has no ownership in Brann, and the power to sell or trade players stays with the club.

The investors are predominantly local businessmen from Bergen and are known Brann supporters, and have expressed desire to help Brann becoming a top class team. According to Bjarne Berg, the company's long-term goal is to make itself redundant without losing money in the process.

The company has partially or fully financed the following player transfers:

Note! All transfer fees are approximates.

Bought from	Date	Transfer fee (NOK)	Player	Transfer fee (NOK)	Date	Sold to
Bryne	December 2003	2.200.000	Ragnvald Soma	6.000.000	March 2006	Viking
Northern Spirit	February 2004	750.000	Dylan Macallister	750.000	March 2006	Lyn
Salzburg	August 2004	5.000.000	Paul Scharner	32.000.000	January 2005	Wigan Athletic
Stabæk	December 2004	10.000.000	Martin Andresen	Free transfer	November 2007	Vålerenga
KR Reykjavik	December 2004	1.000.000	Kristján Örn Sigurðsson	Free transfer	January 2010	Hønefoss
Ham-Kam	November 2005	10.000.000	Petter Vaagan Moen	Free Transfer	January 2011	Queens Park Rangers
FH Hafnarfjarðar	August 2006	2.000.000	Ármann Smári Björnsson	Free transfer	August 2009	Hartlepool United
Vålerenga	August 2006	7.000.000	Ardian Gashi	6.000.000	July 2007	Fredrikstad
Leeds	August 2006	5.000.000 (sign on fee)	Eirik Bakke	Free transfer	January 2011	Sogndal Fotball
Rosenborg	March 2007	6.000.000	Jan Gunnar Solli	Free transfer	January 2011	New York Red Bulls
Løv-Ham	July 2007	2.500.000	Knut Walde	Contract expired	January 2010	-
Elfsborg	July 2007	2.500.000	Joakim Sjöhage	Undisclosed	November 2008	Trelleborg
Free transfer	July 2007	Unknown (sign on fee)	Hassan El Fakiri	-	-	-
Benfica	August 2007	3.000.000	Azar Karadas	2.000.000	September 2009	Kasımpaşa

Investors of Hardball:

- Svein Ove Strømmen - IT
- Rolf Westfal-Larsen - Shipping
- Eivind Kåre Lunde - Managing Director of Hardball
- Bjarne Berg - Managing Director of Hardball
- Reidar Andreas Madsen - Real estate and supermarkets
- Oddvar Leiv Holmedal - Catering
- Arne Veidung - Importer of wine and liquor
- Tor-Inge Måkestad - Fruit and vegetable importer
- Per Jæger - Automobile sales
- Knut Herman Holler Gjøvaag - Automobile sales
- Hermund Sigfred Linde - Real estate
- Bjarne Davidsen - IT
- Karl Kvalheim - Shipping broker
- Arne Viste - Shipping
- Tore Brynjulfsen - Real estate
