= Toyon Lodge, Saratoga =

Former resort, California

Coordinates: 37.2505°N 122.0319°W

Toyon Lodge is a multi-home property in Saratoga, California, United States. Built in 1910, it was run as a resort and restaurant from the 1930s to 1967 before being converted into residential apartments. It is nestled in the foothills of the Santa Cruz Mountains, and it is less than two miles away from Montalvo Arts Center.

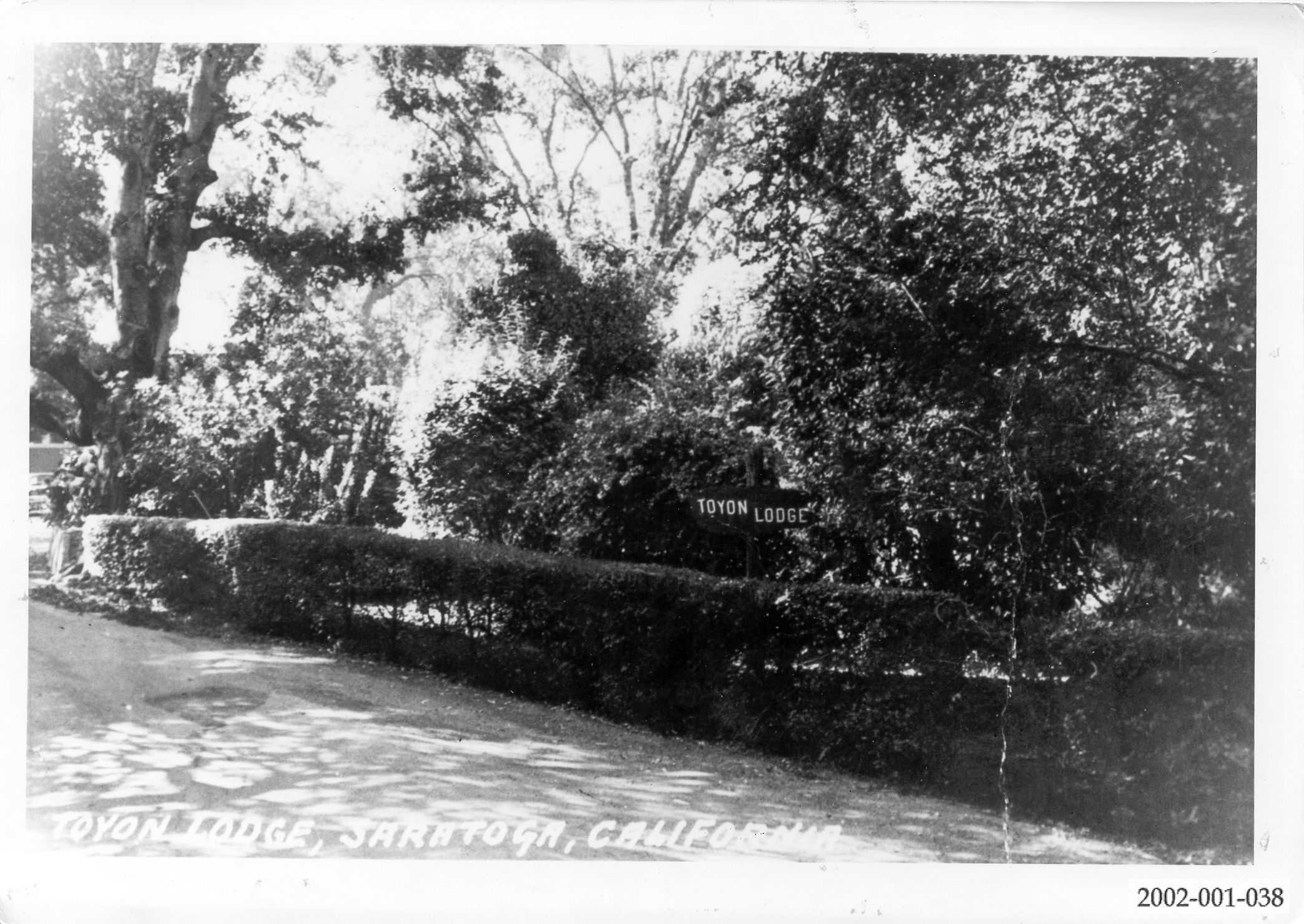
Driveway leading up to Toyon Lodge, Saratoga, California, with property sign.

== History ==
Toyon Lodge was a popular resort location in the Bay Area, and it was recommended as one of three lodging options for the city of Saratoga by Duncan Hines in his 1938 edition of “Lodging for a Night.” His description of the property was:

“Guest House : Toyon Lodge. 1 Mi. W. on Vickery Lane. A quiet, beautifully located place in the foothills. Recommended. 16 rms. A. 2WB. $10.00.”

Famous guests who visited over the years included Joan Fontaine and her sister Olivia de Havilland, who both grew up in Saratoga, as well as Jean Arthur, Lotte Lehmann, and Hedy Lamarr.

Previous owners of Toyon Lodge included Herman Hardtke (1922-1942) and Eugene Mancini (1949-1969). Today it is owned by Joseph Montgomery, father of Paul Montgomery.
