= Svein Ove Strømmen =

Norwegian businessman

Svein Ove Strømmen (1949 – 22 September 2010) was a Norwegian businessperson.

He took his engineer education in the United States, and worked in the Norwegian petroleum industry from 1981 to 1986. He then turned to entrepreneurship and investment.

Together with Bjarne Berg he was a pioneer in the investment company Hardball, which has invested in player transfers for the association football club SK Brann. Through another investment company Isinvest, Strømmen was the largest stock holder in Hardball. Hardball strongly contributed to Brann's victorious season in 2007. He was a member of SK Brann since the 1960s.

At the time of his death he was the chairman of Vizrt, a position he had held since 2004. Since 2000 he was one of the main architects behind the growth of Vizrt, again together with Bjarne Berg. Strømmen was also chairman of Vemtro and Nera. He died in September 2010.
