= Darren Childs =

British business executive

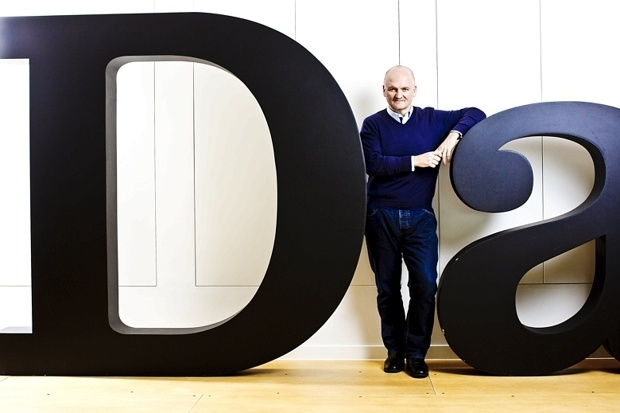
- Darren Childs with Dave logo at UKTV
- Born: Doncaster, South Yorkshire, England
- Education: Doncaster Grammar School; Stanford Graduate School of Business
- Occupation: Businessman
- Title: Chief Executive of Premiership Rugby

Darren Childs is a British business executive. Childs has held a number of senior executive positions across media and was recently the chief executive officer at Premiership Rugby working with CVC Capital Partners.

He was born in Doncaster in 1966 where he studied Computer Science and later Business at Stanford.

He joined the Board of Private Equity firm Nordic Capital owned global software business Vizrt in 2018. The company was sold in March 2022.

He serves on the board of the Kyriakou family owned Antenna Group a diversified family office with investments in high-profile US digital companies as well as European Pay TV, Broadcasting ANT1, and digital services.

At UKTV, he was credited with transforming their market share, with focus digital D2C services, and content creation, for which UKTV won Emmy Awards and BAFTA awards.

He has delivered many speeches including keynotes for the Economist and Financial Times. He is featured on the Corporate Rebels coveted Bucket List

On 7 February 2019 decided to step down as CEO of UKTV after eight years at the helm. In June 2019 he become CEO of Premiership Rugby. At the end of the 2021 season it was announced that Childs stepped down to focus on his other Board positions.

== Previous career ==
Childs has held several senior executive positions in international media.

He moved to Hong Kong in 1991 as part of the launch teams for Star TV, then owned by Li Ka-shing CK Hutchison Holdings and later acquired by News Corporation in 1994, and spent eight years building the business across Asia and Australia. He moved back to London in 1998 to join Sony at Columbia Pictures as Senior Vice-president for Europe.

He joined the BBC Worldwide Board in 2006 as Managing Director as it prepared for IPO, plans for which were cancelled by the incoming Chairman of the BBC Trust.

== Recent articles written by Childs ==
The Standard

The Economist

Insigniam Quarterly

== Other interests ==
1. Member of the London Business School E100 angel investment group, investing in digital and disruptive start up companies.
