= Kiki Stockhammer =

American spokesperson

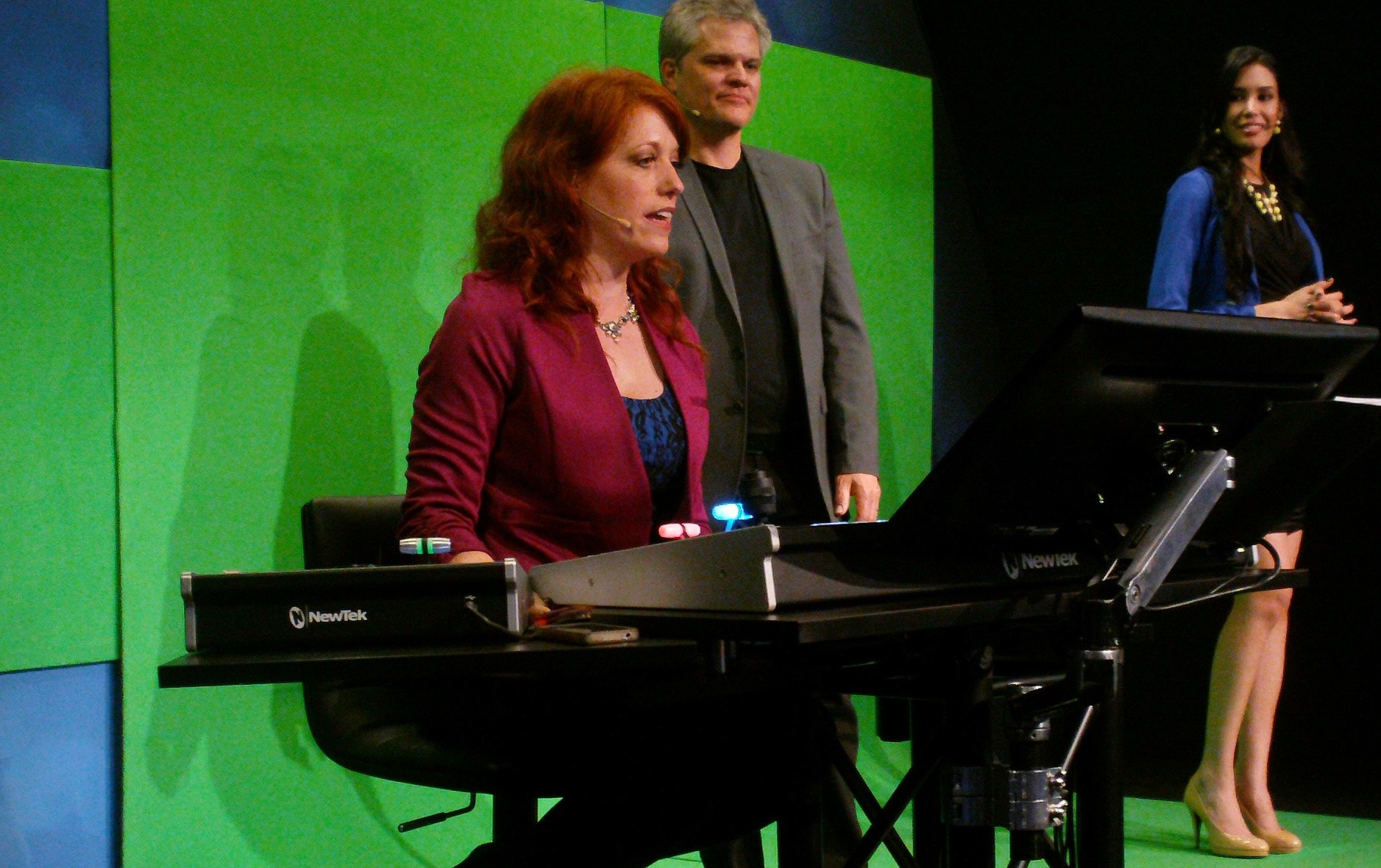
Kiki Stockhammer (left) at the 2013 NAB trade show

Kiki Stockhammer (born c. 1965) is an American spokesperson.

She became well known in the late 1980s as a trade show "traffic stopper" first doing live demonstrations of the capabilities of the Video Toaster from NewTek. She was the premiere operator of this product that innovated in the field of desktop video, and her image was embedded within the product as her silhouette formed the basis for several innovative animated transitions. She reportedly had an unnamed managerial position in the development line of the product. She was known for her ability to deliver corporate statements without a script.

In 1994, Stockhammer followed NewTek cofounder Paul Montgomery to form Play Inc. Her image was the first picture of the company's first product, Snappy. She became Technological Evangelist for the new product, Trinity, that spent several years in development. When the product was finally released, since it was marketed as a TV station in a box, Stockhammer hosted an Internet TV show using the product.

While working at Play Inc., Stockhammer joined a Star Trek themed band of other Play employees called Warp 11, in the role of Chief Science Officer. The band received nationwide exposure when one of their songs ("Everything I Do, I Do with William Shatner") was included in the roast of William Shatner on Comedy Central. The band appeared on the October 2006 cover of Wirehed Magazine.

Following the death of Montgomery, Play Inc. also closed. Stockhammer has returned to NewTek, demonstrating its TV station in a box concept product, TriCaster.

She made a cameo appearance in an episode of Babylon 5, the first TV series to use the Lightwave 3D animation program sold by NewTek with the Video Toaster.
