= List of awards and nominations received by John Seale =

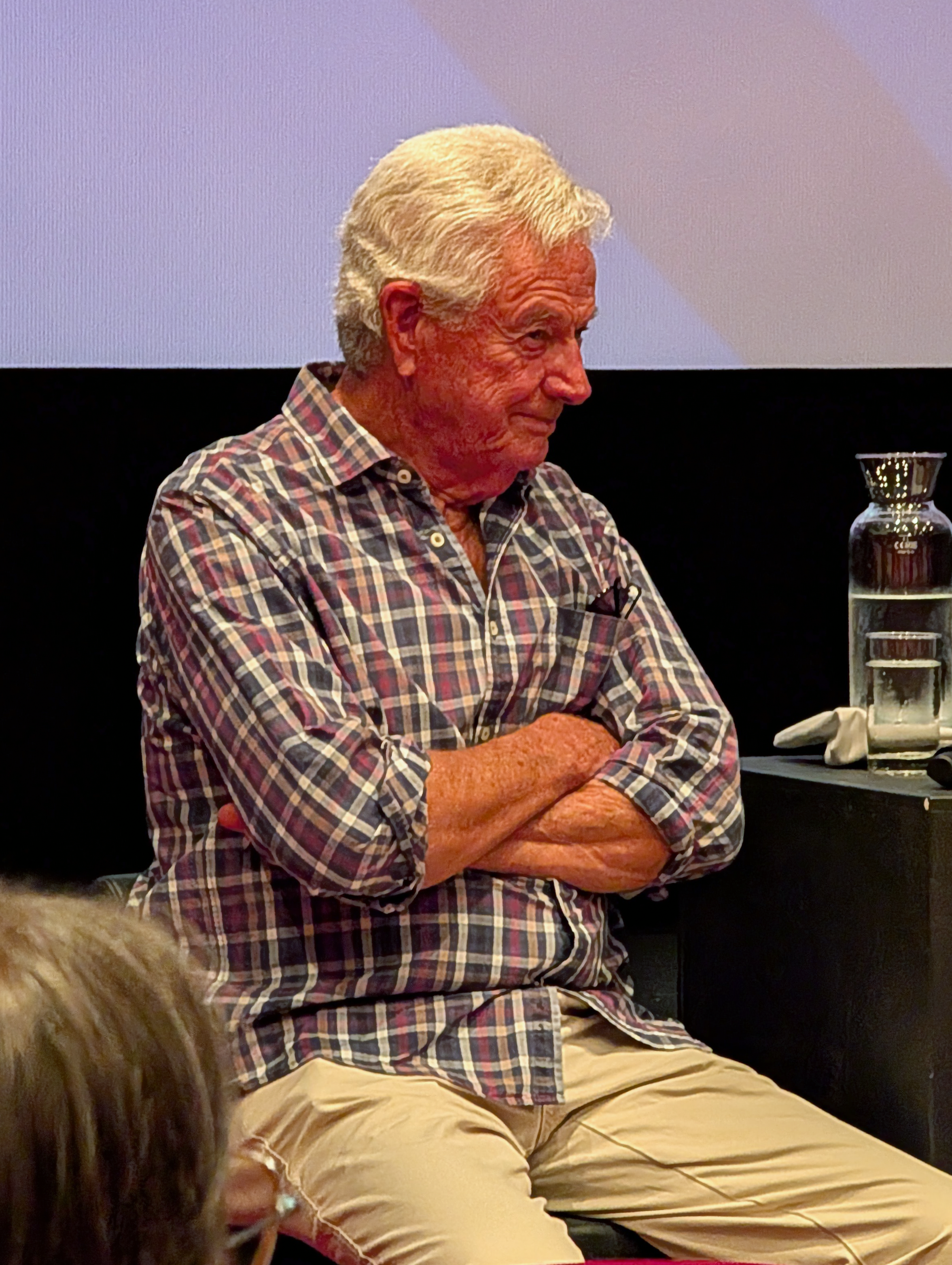
Seale at the 2026 AACTA Festival

John Seale is an Australian retired cinematographer known for his work in Australian and American films. He has received various accolades, including an Academy Award, a BAFTA Award and an American Society of Cinematographers Award.

== Major associations ==
Academy Awards

Year	Category	Title	Result	Ref.
1985	Best Cinematography	Witness	Nominated	
1988	Best Cinematography	Rain Man	Nominated	
1996	Best Cinematography	The English Patient	Won	
2003	Best Cinematography	Cold Mountain	Nominated	
2015	Best Cinematography	Mad Max: Fury Road	Nominated	

BAFTA Awards

Year	Category	Title	Result	Ref.
1985	Best Cinematography	Witness	Nominated	
1988	Best Cinematography	Gorillas in the Mist	Nominated	
1996	Best Cinematography	The English Patient	Won	
1999	Best Cinematography	The Talented Mr. Ripley	Nominated	
2003	Best Cinematography	Cold Mountain	Nominated	
2015	Best Cinematography	Mad Max: Fury Road	Nominated	

American Society of Cinematographers

Year	Category	Title	Result	Ref.
1988	Outstanding Achievement in Cinematography	Rain Man	Nominated	
1996	Outstanding Achievement in Cinematography	The English Patient	Won	
2000	Outstanding Achievement in Cinematography	The Perfect Storm	Nominated	
2003	Outstanding Achievement in Cinematography	Cold Mountain	Nominated	
2010	International Achievement Award		Won	
2015	Outstanding Achievement in Cinematography	Mad Max: Fury Road	Nominated	

== Miscellaneous awards ==
British Society of Cinematographers

Year	Category	Title	Result	Ref.
1985	Best Cinematography	Witness	Nominated	
1989	Best Cinematography	Dead Poets Society	Nominated	
1996	Best Cinematography	The English Patient	Nominated	
2003	Best Cinematography	Cold Mountain	Nominated	
2015	Best Cinematography	Mad Max: Fury Road	Nominated	

Satellite Awards

Year	Category	Title	Result	Ref.
1996	Best Cinematography	The English Patient	Won	
1999	Best Cinematography	The Talented Mr. Ripley	Nominated	
2015	Best Cinematography	Mad Max: Fury Road	Won	

Chicago Film Critics Association

Year	Category	Title	Result	Ref.
1996	Best Cinematography	The English Patient	Won	
1999	Best Cinematography	The Talented Mr. Ripley	Won	
2003	Best Cinematography	Cold Mountain	Nominated	
2015	Best Cinematography	Mad Max: Fury Road	Won	

Boston Society of Film Critics

Year	Category	Title	Result	Ref.
1996	Best Cinematography	The English Patient	Won	
1999	Best Cinematography	The Talented Mr. Ripley	Won	
2003	Best Cinematography	Cold Mountain	Nominated	

Australian Film Institute

Year	Category	Title	Result	Ref.
1981	Best Achievement in Cinematography	The Survivor	Nominated	
1983	Best Achievement in Cinematography	Careful, He Might Hear You	Won	
1984	Best Achievement in Cinematography	Silver City	Nominated	

Australian Cinematographers Society

Year	Category	Title	Result	Ref.
1983	Cinematography of the Year	Goodbye Paradise	Won	
1985	Cinematography of the Year	Witness	Won	
1997	ACS Hall of Fame Induction		Won	
2016	Gold Milli Award		Won	

National Society of Film Critics

Year	Category	Title	Result	Ref.
1996	Best Cinematography	The English Patient	Won	
2015	Best Cinematography	Mad Max: Fury Road	3rd place	

Los Angeles Film Critics Association

Year	Category	Title	Result	Ref.
1996	Best Cinematography	The English Patient (tied with Chris Menges for Michael Collins)	Won	
2015	Best Cinematography	Mad Max: Fury Road	Won	

Florida Film Critics Circle

Year	Category	Title	Result	Ref.
1996	Best Cinematography	The English Patient	Won	
2015	Best Cinematography	Mad Max: Fury Road	Won	

Camerimage

Year	Category	Title	Result	Ref.
2011	Lifetime Achievement Award		Won	
2015	Golden Frog Award	Mad Max: Fury Road	Nominated	

== Other awards ==
Year	Association	Category	Title	Result	Ref.
1996	Dallas–Fort Worth Film Critics Association	Best Cinematography	The English Patient	Won	
1996	European Film Award	Best Cinematography	The English Patient	Won	
1997	Brisbane International Film Festival	Chauvel Award		Won	
2015	AACTA Awards	Best Cinematography	Mad Max: Fury Road	Won	
2015	Australian Film Critics Association	Best Cinematography	Mad Max: Fury Road	Won	
2015	Santa Barbara International Film Festival	Artisan Award (Cinematography)	Mad Max: Fury Road	Won	
2015	New York Film Critics Circle	Best Cinematographer	Mad Max: Fury Road	Won	
2015	Film Critics Circle of Australia	Best Cinematography	Mad Max: Fury Road	Won	
2015	Online Film Critics Society	Best Cinematography	Mad Max: Fury Road	Won	
2015	African-American Film Critics Association	Best Cinematography	Mad Max: Fury Road	Won	
2015	Austin Film Critics Association	Best Cinematography	Mad Max: Fury Road	Nominated	
2015	Broadcast Film Critics Association	Best Cinematography	Mad Max: Fury Road	Nominated	
2015	Houston Film Critics Society	Best Cinematography	Mad Max: Fury Road	Nominated	
2015	London Film Critics' Circle	Technical Achievement of the Year	Mad Max: Fury Road	Nominated	
2015	Boston Online Film Critics Association	Best Cinematography	Mad Max: Fury Road	Won	
2015	New York Film Critics Online	Best Cinematography	Mad Max: Fury Road	Won	
2015	Southeastern Film Critics Association	Best Cinematography	Mad Max: Fury Road	Won	
