= Alone at Last (1980 television pilots) =

Alone At Last is the name of two television pilots that aired on NBC in 1980 featuring the Elliott family. Neither concept was picked up to series. After the first pilot aired, NBC executives determined they liked the concept but not the cast, and shot a second pilot with a new script and cast. The second pilot was not successful. At that point executives determined they did not like the concept either, and declined to pick up the show to series.

== First pilot ==
The first Alone at Last pilot aired on June 24, 1980. A 30-minute pilot for a sitcom, the show was based on a comic reversal of the empty nest syndrome in which Greg Elliott and his wife Laurie Elliott are elated to finally have their children, Michael and Nancy, gone from the family home and living independent lives, only to have them move back in to the chagrin of their parents. Set in a Southern California suburban neighborhood, the pilot featured a plot in which Greg and Laurie are upset over their son's involvement with Sherry, a woman twenty years older than him. It starred Bill Daily as Greg, Virginia Vestoff as Laurie, Kerry Sherman as Nancy, Michael Horton as Michael, Francine Beers as Agnes Bernoski (Greg's mother), Martin Garner as Jack Bernoski (Greg's father), Elaine Joyce as Sherry, Melissa Sherman as Lisa (Sherry's daughter), and Howard Platt as Harry Elliott.

Bernie Harrison in his review in The Kansas City Star stated, "Daily is still trying to find the right situation comedy and Alone at Last is his fourth or fifth try. And miss. Nothing wrong with his casting; few comedy actors convey the butterflies of frustration as adroitly as Daily... The execution is routine. The problem: Where can this show possibly go from here?"

== Second pilot ==
The second Alone at Last pilot aired on November 3, 1980. It starred Eugene Roche as Larry Elliot, a medical doctor who is in conflict with his son over his musical aspirations, and who doesn't understand his wife's feud with his mother. Dr. Elliott works at Memorial General Hospital where he holds the post of chief of radiology. Susan Bay plays Larry's wife Maureen Elliot; Dana Carvey portrays his son Michael Elliot; Lilibet Stern plays his daughter Nancy Elliott, Florence Halop his mother Agnes Bernoski, and Martin Garner returning as Jack Bernoski. Critic Bernie Harrison deemed it a "failed pilot" and advised his readers to skip it.
