= Paul Montgomery =

American businessman (1960 - 1999)

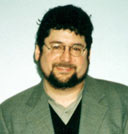
- Montgomery in April 1996
- Born: Joseph Paul Montgomery; June 5, 1960; Los Gatos, California, U.S.
- Died: June 19, 1999 (aged 39); Seattle, Washington, U.S.
- Occupation: Business executive
- Years active: 1982–1999
- Spouse: Michelle Montgomery

Joseph Paul Montgomery (June 5, 1960 – June 19, 1999) was an American entrepreneur and inventor. In the mid 1980s, he was among the first to see the potential of personal computer technology in the field of video production and 3D animation. As Vice President of NewTek and Co-Founder and President of Play, Inc., Montgomery drove the creation of the first widely-successful digital video products, including the Emmy-award-winning Video Toaster and the Snappy Video Snapshot.

In the 1996 book, The Age of Videography, Montgomery was cited as one of the 25 most influential people in the history of videography. Montgomery received a Primetime Emmy award for his personal contributions in creating the Video Toaster. He is listed as an inventor on U.S. patents 6,380,950 and 6,941,517 regarding low-bandwidth television.

== Career ==
=== Beginnings of desktop video ===
Although Montgomery started his career in real estate and artist promotion, in the early 1980s he became enamored by technology and personal computers, in particular with the Commodore Amiga. In 1985, the Amiga computer featured graphics, audio and multi-tasking capabilities greater than other personal computers of its time, making it a suitable platform for early 3D animation, video production and audio production products.

Montgomery first came to the fore in the Amiga community as a founder of the First Amiga User Group (FAUG, pronounced "fog") in California's Silicon Valley. FAUG meetings often featured the hardware and software engineers responsible for the creation of the Amiga, since the Amiga Corporation headquarters was in nearby Santa Clara, California. During this time, Montgomery worked for Trip Hawkins at video game pioneer Electronic Arts as a product manager. Montgomery later credited Hawkins' experience at Apple with the Steve Jobs-like product and marketing strategy Montgomery used at both NewTek and Play. Montgomery met hardware engineer Brad Carvey in a computer store, and upon viewing a demonstration of inventor Tim Jenison's early Amiga experiments, arranged for Carvey and Jenison to meet.

=== NewTek ===
When Electronic Arts decided to focus product development efforts on the Apple IIGS computer rather than the Amiga, Montgomery left and moved to Topeka, Kansas to help Jenison build NewTek. At that time, Jenison, Carvey, and others were developing a Video Black Box for the Amiga capable of real-time video effects.

Under Jenison and Montgomery's leadership, this Video Black Box evolved into the Video Toaster. Billed as the "television studio in-a-box", the product combined the traditionally separate, dedicated pieces of traditional video production hardware into a single, relatively inexpensive add-on for the Amiga. It included a real-time video switcher, real-time video effects, luma-keyer, character generator, still store, paint software and the Lightwave 3D animation software. The Video Toaster altered the video production industry by proving a personal computer could make high-quality television visuals at a low price point.

Montgomery brought fellow FAUG members Allen Hastings and Stuart Ferguson to NewTek to create Lightwave. Borrowing a slogan from Apple Inc., NewTek was aggressive in promoting Lightwave as the 3D animation software "for the rest of us". Lightwave was inexpensive and ran on the Amiga personal computer, while its competition at the time was expensive and ran on dedicated Silicon Graphics workstations. Lightwave was used to create animation and special effects for many television and feature films including Babylon 5, Star Trek, and Titanic.

The NewTek team was featured in USA Today, Time, Newsweek, Forbes and Fortune as well as being dubbed "revolutionaries" by Tom Brokaw on NBC Nightly News and featured as "the bad boys of video" in Rolling Stone Magazine. In 1993, the National Academy of Television Arts and Sciences awarded Montgomery and the other inventors of the Video Toaster a Primetime Emmy award. That same year, Fortune estimated the privately held company's sales at US$25 million.

=== Play Inc. ===
Tensions began to rise at NewTek between Jenison and Montgomery over technical, marketing and personal issues. Commodore's business was failing, the Amiga platform was at risk, and Jenison was slow to accept a new strategy.

In 1994, Montgomery and Jenison split. Montgomery left, taking most of NewTek's programmers and some top marketing staff with him. After several months, the group founded Play Incorporated together with Amiga software leader Digital Creations and video hardware developer Progressive Image Technologies, and focused their efforts on the Microsoft Windows platform.

Play's first product, the Snappy Video Snapshot, was released in April 1995. Snappy was a still-image digitizer which could take video input from a VCR, camcorder, TV or any video source, and capture true-color (24-bit) high-quality digital still images. Snappy was the first mainstream video input device for Windows personal computers, with Play selling over US$25 million of Snappy in its first year. PC Magazine awarded Snappy its Technical Excellence award in December 1995, stating "Every once in a while, we see a product so impressive, it makes us rethink an entire category. That was certainly the case with Play Inc.'s Snappy."

Play's next consumer-oriented product was Gizmos, a suite of utilities, games and multimedia software for Windows personal computers. PC Magazine said Gizmos was one of the "Best Products of 1998".

Play created Trinity as the next-generation Video Toaster for the Windows personal computer platform. Trinity included real-time 3D video effects, digital component video switcher, chroma-keyer, still and video clip store, character generator, paint system, and non-linear video editor. After several lengthy delays, Trinity shipped in August 1998 to wide critical acclaim. To many in the industry, Trinity became the logical successor to the Video Toaster. Play also acquired 3D animation software developer Electric Image in November 1998. Electric Image animation system was re-launched for both Mac and Windows platforms as Electric Image Universe.

Play also launched 'Play TV', an online network of shows broadcast from Play headquarters, the San Francisco Bay Area and as far away as Revelstoke B.C. and streamed over the Internet. The network was the first live internet TV network and an early precursor to the internet video revolution.

TV Technology called Play Incorporated “one of the industry's most aggressive and innovative developers“. Play folded following Montgomery's death, with many employees, including Kiki Stockhammer returning to NewTek, which by then had redirected its efforts also into the Windows platform.

== Management style ==
Montgomery was involved in customer engagement and technology at NewTek and Play. Early users of the Video Toaster included Todd Rundgren, Herbie Hancock, Penn and Teller, U2 and Oingo Boingo. During this period, NewTek and Play received national media coverage, with feature stories on NBC Nightly News and an article in Rolling Stone Magazine. He described himself the P.T. Barnum of NewTek.

== Company culture ==
NewTek and Play both contained employees passionate about Montgomery and the products they created. Wil Wheaton, who briefly moved to Topeka to work for NewTek, called Montgomery "the soul of NewTek and the soul of Play" in his book Just a Geek. NewTek employees were often spotted roller blading, playing laser tag, video games and working long hours.

== Death ==
June 19, 1999 Montgomery died of a heart attack while vacationing in Seattle. Montgomery was survived by his wife, Michele, his parents, and siblings.
