= NewTek =

American media software company

NewTek, Inc.
- Type: Private
- Industry: Software
- Founded: Kansas, United States (1985)
- Founder: Tim Jenison; Paul Montgomery
- Headquarters: San Antonio, Texas, United States
- Parent: Vizrt
- Website: www.newtek.com

NewTek, Inc., is a hardware and software company, based in San Antonio, Texas, that produced live and post-production video tools and visual imaging software for personal computers. The company was founded in 1985 in Topeka, Kansas, United States, by Tim Jenison and Paul Montgomery. On April 1, 2019, it was announced that NewTek would be acquired by Vizrt.

== Products ==
In 2005, NewTek introduced TriCaster, a product that merges live video switching, broadcast graphics, virtual sets, special effects, audio mixing, recording, social media publishing, and web streaming into an integrated, portable and compact appliance. TriCaster was announced at DEMO@15 and then launched at the National Association of Broadcasters (NAB) in 2005. At NAB 2006, NewTek announced TriCaster PRO, which introduced professional video, audio connections, and virtual sets (using proprietary NewTek LiveSet technology) to the TriCaster line.

At NAB 2007, NewTek introduced TriCaster STUDIO, the first TriCaster to support six cameras. At NAB 2008, NewTek introduced TriCaster BROADCAST, the first model to deliver SDI video and audio support. In early 2009, NewTek introduced 3PLAY, a portable multi-channel HD/SD slow-motion replay system. At NAB 2009, NewTek introduced TriCaster TCXD300, the first high-definition TriCaster. At NAB 2010, NewTek introduced TriCaster TCXD850, a 22-channel high-definition model in a rack mount form factor. The TCXD850 won four industry awards: the Winners Circle Award, STAR, Vidy, and Black Diamond awards from EventDV, TV Technology, Videography, and DV magazines, respectively, at NAB 2010.

In 2004, NewTek released the source code to some of their Amiga Platform products through DiscreetFX.

In 2015, NewTek announced the Network Device Interface (NDI) protocol which allows applications and devices to transport high-quality, low-latency video over gigabit Ethernet networks. The protocol was available for public products starting in early 2016. In 2017, version 3 of the protocol was released, which adds multicast support and a high-efficiency mode called NDI-HX.

== Company history ==
The company's first products included DigiView in 1986 and DigiPaint, both for the Commodore Amiga personal computer.

DigiView was the first full-color video digitizer and added slow-scan digitizing capabilities to the Amiga platform allowing images to be imported at low cost before modern image scanning technology was widely available. Consisting of an input module that allowed the connection of a standard black-and-white video camera (security cameras were popularly used), greyscale images could be captured to the Amiga. With the addition of a color wheel, full-color images could be captured by rotating the wheel's red, green, and blue segments in front of the lens and capturing the same image three times, once through each filter. This could be done manually or with a motorized accessory. The software combined the color information from the three images into one color image. According to the company, DigiView sold over 100,000 units.

The Amiga hardware included the ability to display 4096 colors on the screen simultaneously, and DigiPaint allowed graphic artists to draw with a variety of tools in that full-color space at a time when IBM PCs were typically limited to between 4 and 16 colors. The DigiPaint product offered the unique capability of editing and painting on images in the Amiga's unique Hold-And-Modify high color mode in real-time.

The company found widespread fame and started the desktop-video revolution by releasing the Video Toaster, an innovative system for low-cost video switching and post production. The company was featured in high-profile magazine articles such as Rolling Stone and was also featured on NBC Nightly News. In the early 1990s, a proliferation of video effects in television shows is directly attributable to the Video Toaster's effect of lowering the cost of video-processing hardware from the $100K range to the $4K range.

In addition, the company developed LightWave 3D, a 3D modeling, rendering, and animation system, which has been used extensively in television and film. For example, the television series Babylon 5, which eschewed models for space scenes, was 100% CGI from the first episode using the NewTek software.

The fame of Video Toaster extended beyond the product: the company's founder, Tim Jenison, and its vice president, Paul Montgomery, were presented as a new breed of entrepreneurs running a different kind of company.

Jenison and Montgomery eventually split, with Montgomery leaving to help form a new company called Play, Inc., which ultimately ceased operations after Montgomery's untimely death.

In 1997, the company moved to San Antonio, Texas, United States.

In 2005, NewTek founder, Tim Jenison, was inducted into the San Antonio Inventors Hall of Fame as the "Father of Desktop Video."

In April 2019, NewTek was acquired by Vizrt for a sum of US$95.25 million, disclosed in Vizrt's Q2 report.

== Notable personalities ==
=== Tim Jenison ===
A founder of the company is Tim Jenison. In addition to his efforts at NewTek, with a personal interest in the artwork and the skill of the Dutch painter Johannes Vermeer, it eventually led to an investigation of the artist's technique and a feature film documentary entitled Tim's Vermeer. The movie was released in early 2014, and was directed by Teller, produced by Penn & Teller, and distributed by Sony Pictures Classics.

=== Kiki Stockhammer ===
A spokesperson for the NewTek products, Kiki Stockhammer provided many demonstration images that were used in introductory videos, as well as providing her silhouette for a number of transition effects included with the Video Toaster.
