= One of the Boys (1982 TV series) =

American television sitcom

- L–R: Rooney, Carvey, and Lane
- Genre: Sitcom
- Created by: Bernie Orenstein; Saul Turteltaub
- Starring: Mickey Rooney; Dana Carvey; Nathan Lane; Scatman Crothers; Francine Beers
- Country of origin: United States
- Original language: English
- No. of seasons: 1
- No. of episodes: 13

Production
- Executive producers: Bernie Orenstein; Saul Turteltaub
- Camera setup: Multi-camera
- Running time: 22–24 minutes
- Production companies: TOY II Productions; Columbia Pictures Television

Original release
- Network: NBC
- Release: January 23 – April 24, 1982

One of the Boys is an American television sitcom that aired on NBC from January 23 to April 24, 1982. It starred Mickey Rooney, Dana Carvey, Nathan Lane, and Scatman Crothers. TV Guide ranked One of the Boys at number 24 on its TV Guide's 50 Worst Shows of All Time list in 2002.

It was the final sitcom produced by TOY II Productions.

BET aired reruns of the show in the late-80s.

== Plot ==
Oliver Nugent (Mickey Rooney) is a spry senior citizen, who, along with his friend Bernard Solomon (Scatman Crothers), leaves his nursing home and moves in with his college-aged grandson, Adam Shields (Dana Carvey), who is attending Sheffield College in New Jersey, and his roommate, Jonathan Burns (Nathan Lane). Also involved is Adam's girlfriend, Jane (Meg Ryan) and their landlady, Mrs. Green (Francine Beers), who is more than entranced with Oliver.

== Cast ==
- Mickey Rooney as Oliver Nugent
- Dana Carvey as Adam Shields
- Nathan Lane as Jonathan Burns
- Scatman Crothers as Bernard Solomon
- Francine Beers as Mrs. Green

=== Recurring ===
- Meg Ryan as Jane

== Episodes ==
No.	Title	Directed by	Written by	Original release date
1	"Too Young or Too Old"	Peter Baldwin	Don Flynn	January 23, 1982
While searching for a job, Oliver suspects age discrimination when he does not get a job. Guest Starring: Kim Delgado as Paramedic
2	"Parents' Weekend"	Lee Bernhardi	Bernie Orenstein & Saul Turteltaub	January 30, 1982
Adam and Jonathan push Jonathan's mother and Oliver together. Guest Starring: Rosemary Prinz as Violet
3	"Double Trouble"	Lee Bernhardi	Norman Barasch	February 6, 1982
Oliver becomes a prime suspect in a recent rash of burglaries in the neighborhood. Guest Starring: Dick Latessa as Marone
4	"His Cheatin' Heart"	Doug Rogers	Barry Harman	February 13, 1982
Oliver decides to go back to school after he enrolls at the university, but the experience becomes more than he can handle. Guest Starring: Olympia Dukakis as Professor
5	"Too Much to Lose"	Peter Baldwin	Bernie Orenstein & Saul Turteltaub	February 20, 1982
Oliver tries to lose weight.
6	"Double Date"	Doug Rogers	Dinah Kirgo & Julie Kirgo	February 27, 1982
Oliver juggles two dates to the Senior's Dance.
7	"The Lass Is Always Greener"	Peter Baldwin	Dinah Kirgo & Julie Kirgo	March 6, 1982
Adam gets in trouble when Jonathan's new girlfriend will not leave him alone.
8	"His Old Flame"	Lee Bernhardi	Don Flynn	March 13, 1982
Oliver meets an old flame he met while serving in World War II.
9	"Extracurricular Activities"	Doug Rogers	Laurie Newbound & Suzy Simon	March 20, 1982
Jonathan stars in a new play, but Adam writes a negative review, causing friction.
10	"On the Rebound"	Lee Bernhardi	Dinah Kirgo & Julie Kirgo	March 27, 1982
Jonathan's sister visits and Adam is immediately taken, but she is on rebound from a previous relationship.
11	"Don't Bank on It: Part 1"	Lee Bernhardi	Bernie Orenstein & Saul Turteltaub	April 10, 1982
Oliver and Bernard find a bank machine that spits out money, but two bank robbers also find out. Guest Starring: Cleavon Little and Barney Martin as Robbers
12	"Don't Bank on It: Part 2"	Lee Bernhardi	Bernie Orenstein & Saul Turteltaub	April 17, 1982
Continuing from the previous episode, the boys get mixed up with the bank robbers. Guest Starring: Cleavon Little and Barney Martin as Robbers
13	"Pilot"	Peter Baldwin	Bernie Orenstein & Saul Turteltaub	April 24, 1982
In the "lost" pilot, Oliver moves in with Adam. Guest Starring: Wendie Malick as Joan
