= Francine Beers =

American actress (1924–2014)

- Born: November 26, 1924; Brooklyn, New York City, U.S.
- Died: March 27, 2014 (aged 89); Manhattan, New York City, U.S.
- Occupation: Actress
- Years active: 1944–2007
- Known for: In Her Shoes

Francine Beers (November 26, 1924 – March 27, 2014) was an American radio, television, film and theatre actress, whose career spanned nearly six decades.

== Life and career ==
Beers was born in Brooklyn, New York, the only child of Harry and Sadie Beers. Her father had two sisters, Rose and Sally. Sally appeared in vaudeville and in the Ziegfeld Follies. Harry Beers died when Francine was 15 years old. Francine and her mother moved in with Sadie's parents until Francine graduated from high school in 1942. After graduation, she worked for Young & Rubicam advertising, beginning in 1944 in their Radio and Television department.

In 1964, she left Young and Rubicam to become an actress. She largely played character parts and supporting roles in radio, on stage, in soap operas and on television shows. Her roles included Judge Janis Silver (Law and Order), Sybil Gooley (All in the Family; a role also played by Jane Connell), and Bea Finster on Kate & Allie. Before and after venturing into TV acting, she enjoyed a lengthy theatre career in the 1960s and 1970s, appearing in such plays as "Cafe Crown" (1964), 6 Rms Riv Vu (1972; she also appeared in the 1974 TV film adaptation), Arthur Miller's The American Clock ("A Mural for Theatre") (1980), and William Alfred's The Curse of an Aching Heart in 1982. Beers continued to work as an actress until she retired in 2007. Her last known credit was as Mrs. Lefkowitz in In Her Shoes (2004).

== Death ==
Beers died on Thursday, March 27, 2014, aged 89, in her apartment on Manhattan's Upper West Side.

== Career ==
=== Theatrical roles ===
- 1962: King of the Whole Damn World, Jan Hus Playhouse, NY (Hannah Klein)
- 1964: Café Crown (Celia Perlman)
- 1964, 1965: Kiss Mama (Susie)
- 1966: Monopoly at the Establishment Theatre, NY (The Mother)
- 1967: Funny Girl (Mrs. Strakosh, the matchmaker)
- 1972–1973: Six Rooms Riv Vu (Lady in 4A and Trixie's mother)
- 1980–81: The American Clock (Fanny Margulies)
- 1982: Curse of an Aching Heart in Little Theatre New York (Minnie Crump)
- 1982: New Theatre Workshop Monday Evening Series, BMI Workshop appearances

=== Major theatrical tours ===
- 1966: Midnight Ride of Alvin Blum (Clara)
- 1967: On a Clear Day, etc. (Mrs. Hatch)

=== Film ===
- 1971: Made for Each Other
- 1971: A New Leaf - Henrietta's Servant
- 1984: Over the Brooklyn Bridge - Ruth Sherman
- 1987: 3 Men and a Baby - Woman at Gift Shop
- 1988: Sticky Fingers - Gertie
- 1998: Meschugge - Martha Galinski
- 2000: Keeping the Faith - Greta Nussbaum
- 2005: Trust the Man - Old Lady
- 2005: In Her Shoes - Mrs. Lefkowitz
- 2007: Lucky You - Elderly Female Player

=== Television ===
- 1970: The Doctors - Patient
- 1974: The Carol Burnett Show - Mrs. Raskin
- 1974: 6 Rms Riv Vu - Woman in 4 A
- 1975: All in the Family - Sybil Gooley
- 1980: Alone at Last - Agnes Bernowski
- 1978–81: Edge of Night - Lillian Goodman #1
- 1981: ABC Afterschool Specials - Mrs. Kvares
- 1981–82: One of the Boys - Mrs. Green
- 1985: Brass - Eileen
- 1986: Kate & Allie - Bea Finster
- 1989: Chicken Soup - Hilda
- 1989: True Blue
- 1990: The Days and Nights of Molly Dodd - Receptionist
- 1991: American Playhouse - Judy
- 1991–97: Law & Order - Arraignment Judge Janis Silver
- 1993: TriBeCa - Woman in Curlers
- 1995: The Wright Verdicts - Judge Simpson
- 2000: Law & Order: Special Victims Unit - Francis Reiner
- 2002: Sex and the City - Mrs. Cohen

== Awards ==
1988: Helen Hayes Award, Washington D.C. Light Up the Sky - Arena Stage Outstanding Supporting Actress in a Resident Production.

== Links ==
- King of the Whole Damn World - O'Connor, Jim (April 16, 1962). "'King of the World' A Very Funny Show". New York Times.
- King of the Whole Damn World - Dallas, Athena (April 27, 1962). "Hellenic American Scenes". The Greek Press, Chicago Illinois.
- King of the Whole Damn World - 'JH" (April 28, 1962). "King of the Whole Damn World". Cue.
- King of the Whole Damn World - "The Imps of Bleeker Street". Saturday Review. May 6, 1962.
- Kiss Mama - Molleson, John (October 2, 1964). "'Kiss Mama': Twirling A Flavorful Pasta". New York Herald Tribune.
- Kiss Mama - Thompson, Jack (October 2, 1964). "La Rosa Turns to Acting". American.
- Kiss Mama - Davis, James (October 2, 1964). "'Mama' Is A Fun Play". Daily News.
- Kiss Mama - Funk, Lewis (October 2, 1964). "George Panetta's 'Kiss Mama' at the Actors Playhouse". New York Times.
- Kiss Mama - Lloyd, Eric (October 5, 1964). "A Family Saga". Wall Street Journal.
- Kiss Mama - Share, Peter (October 8, 1964). "Theatre: 'Kiss Mama'". Village Voice.
- Kiss Mama - "Off Broadway: At Home with the Caparutas". New Yorker. October 10, 1964.
- Kiss Mama - 'Kenn.' (October 21, 1964). "Off-Broadway Reviews: Kiss Mama". Variety.
- Monopoly - Molleson, John (March 7, 1966). "4 Short Plays by Jerome Kass Mark Birth of a Playwright". New York Herald Tribune.
- Funny Girl - Kelly, Herb (March 15, 1967). "'Funny Girl' A Hit Show That Uncovers New Star". The Miami News.
- Funny Girl - Burns, Ben (April 4, 1967). "Barb(Actress)ra Funny 'Funny Girl'". Miami Herald.
- Funny Girl - Freund Bob (April 4, 1967). "'Funny Girl' Tugs At The Heart, Tickles Ribs". Ft. Lauderdale News.
- Clear Day - Dettmer, Roger (August 4, 1967). "Two Cheers for 'Clear Day'". Chicago's American.
