= Martin Garner (actor) =

American film and television actor

- Born: July 9, 1927; Brooklyn, New York, U.S.
- Died: September 28, 2001 (aged 74); Englewood, New Jersey, U.S.
- Occupation: Actor
- Years active: 1963–1999

Martin Garner (July 9, 1927 – September 28, 2001) was an American film and television actor. He was known for playing the role of Mr. Weinstein in the 1983 film Twilight Zone: The Movie.

Born in Brooklyn, New York. Garner appeared in television programs including Barney Miller, Taxi, The John Larroquette Show, Mr. Belvedere, Cagney & Lacey, St. Elsewhere, Welcome Back, Kotter, The A-Team, The Bob Newhart Show and Kojak. He also appeared in films such as My Favorite Year, Airplane II: The Sequel, Oh, God! You Devil, The Frisco Kid and The Big Fix.

Garner died on September 28, 2001 at the Actors Fund Home in Englewood, New Jersey. He was buried at Calverton National Cemetery in Long Island, New York.

== Filmography ==
=== Film ===
Year	Title	Role	Notes
1974	Law and Disorder		
1975	Hester Street	Boss	
1976	Raid on Entebbe	Man at Airport	uncredited
1978	The Big Fix	Bittleman	
1979	The Frisco Kid	Rabbi	
1980	Alone at Last	Jack Bernoski	TV movie
1982	My Favorite Year	Mr. Cantor – Neighbor	
1982	Hey Good Lookin'	Yonkel (voice)	
1982	Airplane II: The Sequel	Old Man No. 2	uncredited
1983	Twilight Zone: The Movie	Mr. Weinstein	
1984	Oh, God! You Devil	Shamus	
1989	Chances Are	Mr. Zellerbach	
1989	Let It Ride	Rudy	
1989	The Neon Empire	Lindy Bartender	TV movie
1991	Till There Was You	Mr. Jimmy	
1991	N.Y.P.D. Mounted	Man	TV movie
1992	Memphis		TV movie
1999	Shark in a Bottle	The Bellboy	

=== Television ===
Year	Title	Role	Notes
1963	The Doctors and the Nurses	Kurawicz	1 episode
1966	The Jackie Gleason Show	Lenny – Bookie	1 episode
1975	Kojak	Moishe	2 episodes
1975	The Rookies	Fred	1 episode
1975	The Bob Newhart Show	The Bun Man	1 episode
1976	Joe Forrester		1 episode
1976	The Blue Knight	Manager	1 episode
1976–1981	Barney Miller	Mr. Frumkus/Steven Himmel/Samuel Tragash/Martin Golden/Ira Buckman	5 episodes
1976	Delvecchio	Morris Stankey	1 episode
1976	Serpico	Weinstein	1 episode
1977	Phyllis	Weinglass	1 episode
1977	Welcome Back, Kotter	Lou Grapette	2 episodes
1978	Kaz		1 episode
1980	Alone at Last	Jack Bernoski	Television pilot
1981	House Cals	Sam Gerber	1 episode
1981	The White Shadow	Mr. Goldstein	1 episode
1981	Jessica Novak	Marvin	1 episode
1982–1985	Hill Street Blues	Store Owner #1/Pawnbroker	3 episodes
1982	Taxi	The Cabbie	1 episode
1982–1984	Cagney & Lacey	Mankowitz/Florist	2 episodes
1983	The A-Team	Mr. Laskey	1 episode
1983–1984	The Fall Guy	Driver	2 episodes
1984	St. Elsewhere	William Bonwit	1 episode
1984–1985	Night Court	Bernie	5 episodes
1984	Brothers	Tom Selleck	1 episode
1985–1986	Mr. Belvedere	Mr. Beckman/Mr. Traeger	2 episodes
1985	The Facts of Life	Mr. Lowell	1 episode
1987	It's Garry Shandling's Show	Mr. Schumacher	1 episode
1987	CBS Summer Playhouse	Norman	1 episode
1987	Beauty and the Beast	Moe	1 episode
1989	Tales from the Crypt	Roy	1 episode
1989	Wiseguy	Old Man	1 episode
1989	The Super Mario Bros. Super Show!	Mikhail S. Gorbachev	1 episode
1989	L.A. Law	Mordechai	1 episode
1990	Alien Nation	Sol Birnbaum	1 episode
1990	Good Grief	Beanie	1 episode
1993	The John Larroquette Show	Leonard Shenker	1 episode
