= Warp 11 =

American indie rock band

- Origin: Sacramento, California, USA
- Genres: Alternative rock, punk rock
- Years active: 1999–2024
- Members: Captain Karl Miller; Chief Engineer Brian Moore; Chief Science Officer Kiki Stockhammer; Commander John Merlino
- Past members: Chief Medical Officer Jeff Hewitt
- Website: warp11.com

Warp 11 was an independent rock band from Sacramento, California, that performed original songs with lyrics entirely about Star Trek. Warp 11's music covered a wide range of styles including alternative, classic rock, punk, country and blues. Their lyrics were humorous and sometimes profane. Warp 11 was interviewed in the Paramount Pictures documentary Trekkies 2. The Warp 11 song "Everything I Do, I Do with William Shatner" was included in the television broadcast of the Comedy Central Roast of William Shatner.

== History ==
In 1999, Karl Miller was working for an Internet broadcasting company, Play TV, making a streaming Internet video show about Star Trek. Karl decided to form a band that only sang songs about Star Trek to fill time on the show. He had already been in bands with Jeff Hewitt as a teenager and the rest of the band fell into place quickly. Warp 11 formed in 1999 with Karl Miller, Brian Moore, Jeff Hewitt, and Kiki Stockhammer.

Starting in 2005, John Merlino (son of Grammy Award winning singer Gene Merlino), although not an official member of Warp 11, could often be seen playing drums for Warp 11 during concerts to allow Hewitt to take center stage (or to relieve him when he was injured and couldn't play a full set, since Warp 11's sets averaged close to two hours at that time) and was soon given the rank of ensign. At a September 22, 2007 performance in San Francisco, Merlino played drums for the entire show, and during the performance Miller hinted that Hewitt had left the band due to physical problems resulting from numerous injuries. Merlino was promoted from "ensign" to "number one" (commander or first officer) at that show. Miller stated that Hewitt may return occasionally to lend his vocal talents, which he did for the CD release performance of "Suck My Spock Some More".

Warp 11's final show was on May 4, 2024, and celebrated their 25th anniversary. Also, given the importance of that date with Star Wars lore ("May the Fourth" be with you...), Warp 11 opened for themselves as a Star Wars tribute band named "Hyperdrive 12".

== Band members ==
=== Current members ===
- "Captain" Karl Miller – bass and vocals
- "Chief Engineer" Brian Moore – guitar and vocals
- "Chief Science Officer" Kiki Stockhammer – keyboards and vocals
- "Commander" John Merlino – drums, percussion, piano, and vocals

=== Former members ===
- "Chief Medical Officer" Jeff Hewitt – drums and vocals 1999–2007 - The band announced that Jeff died on October 11, 2022, "from complications of an ongoing medical condition".

== Discography ==
Warp 11 has released eight full-length studio albums to date, plus a remix and remaster of their first album.

- Suck My Spock (2000) – The final song of the album, "Montalban", is commonly the final song played at Warp 11 concerts. Like all of their future albums, this first Warp 11 album features songs with Star Trek as the subject matter. Suck My Spock has not been embraced by some Star Trek fans due to the crude sound of the album title.
- Red Alert (2002)
- Boldly Go Down On Me (2005)
- It's Dead, Jim (2007)
- Suck My Spock Some More (2008) – This album features remastered and remixed songs from Suck My Spock as well as two previously unrecorded songs.
- I Don't Want to Go to Heaven as Long as They Have Vulcans in Hell (2009) – SyFy Channel said of this album, "Best played loud, Vulcans in Hell is hard-driving and muscular, laced with raunchy sex-drugs-and-rock-and-roll humor and profanity." This is the first album with John Merlino playing drums.
- Borgasm (2011) – Warp 11's first concept album, about a clash of wills between a Starfleet Captain, a treacherous deserting security officer, and the Borg Queen.
- Rock Out With Your Spock Out (2015)
- The Search For Rock (2021)

On August 6, 2019, Warp 11 launched a Kickstarter for their eighth album, to be entitled "Enterprise B-Sides", with an intended release date of December, 2019. It was described as "nearly twenty years in the making, as it only contains songs that were created during the writing sessions for every other album Warp 11 has ever done." The campaign was 100% funded in less than three days, and in a campaign update the band announced that they had started recording the album as of mid-September. On April 8, 2020, during delays caused by the COVID-19 pandemic, Warp 11 announced on Kickstarter and Facebook they had changed the album's title to "The Search for Rock" to better reflect the album's diverse musical styles, primarily due to the success of the Kickstarter campaign (which ended up raising more than 250% of the original goal), and its associated stretch goals increasing the number of songs on the album from 14 to 20. Warp 11 added a 21st song to the album and released it to their backers in digital form on April 5, 2021 (aka "First Contact Day").

== Sources ==
- review of "Borgasm" (revolutionsf.com)
- interview about "Borgasm" (revolutionsf.com)
- news article (newsreview.com)
- review of 'It's Dead, Jim' (sfsignal.com)
- review of “Boldly Go Down On Me (revolutionsf.com)
- review of “Boldly Go Down On Me (trektoday.com)
- multiple reviews (roughedge.com)
- review of 'Red Alert' (sfcrowsnest.com)
- live show review and interview (mysteryisland.net)
- live review (mysteryisland.net)
- band bio (newsreview.com)
- interview (thedigitallifestyle.tv)
- bootleg recordings
