= VMix =

Multimedia mixing software for Windows

vMix

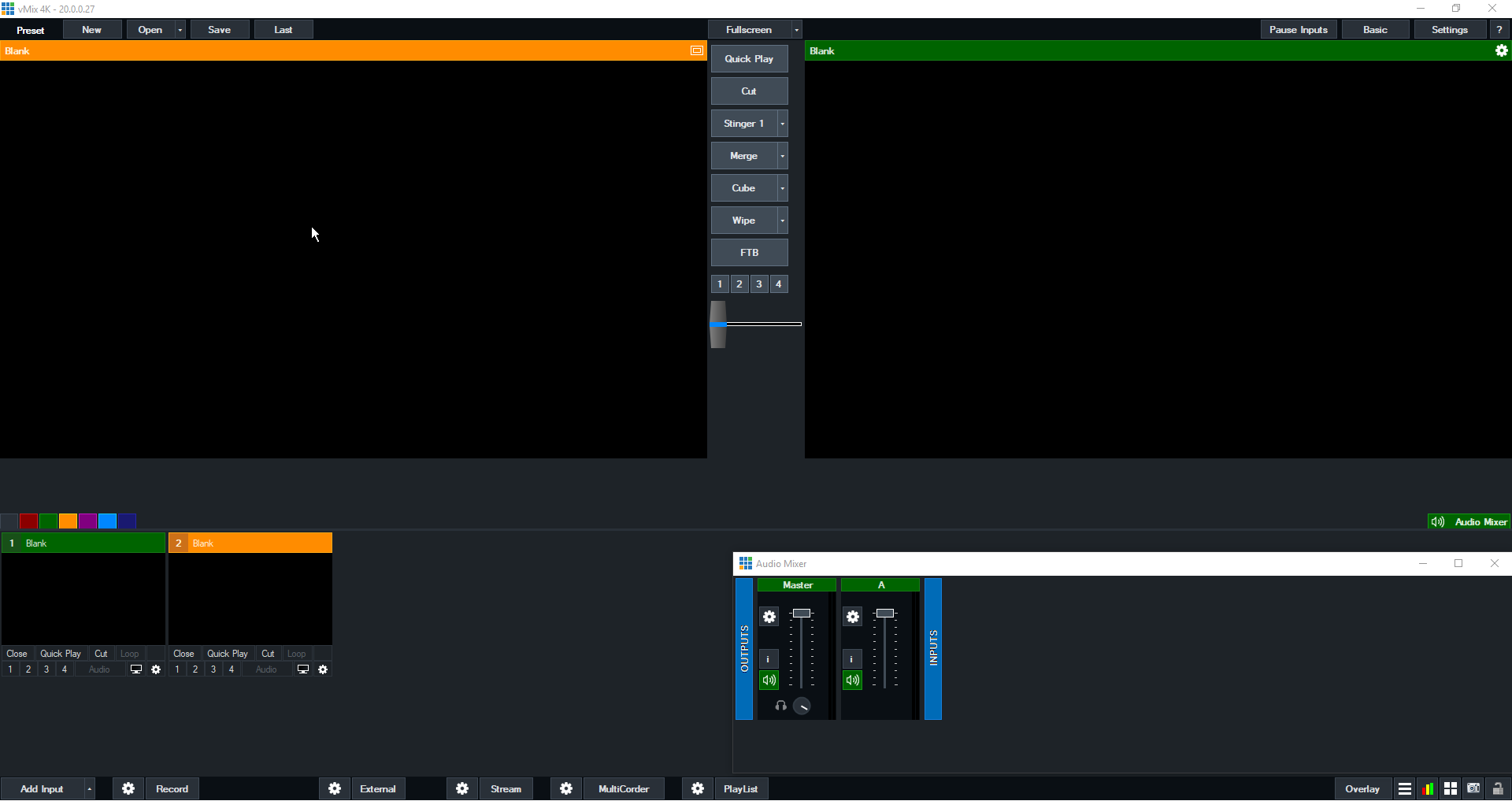
- vMix 4K
- Developer: StudioCoast Pty Ltd.
- Stable release: 29.0.0.46 / 2 February 2026
- Written in: VB.NET
- Operating system: Windows 10 and later
- Platform: x86-64
- Available in: 9 languages
- List of languages: German; English; Spanish; French; Japanese; Korean; Portuguese; Russian; Chinese
- Type: Live streaming
- License: Trialware
- Website: vmix.com

vMix is a proprietary software vision mixer available for the Windows operating system. The software is developed by StudioCoast PTY LTD. Like most vision mixing software, it allows users to switch inputs, mix audio, record outputs, and live stream cameras, videos files, audio, and more, in resolutions of up to 4K. The software is also capable of serving image magnification (IMAG) and projection needs in many instances, with various configurable external output and display options.

vMix is available in multiple editions ranging in price and available features. Current editions include Basic, Basic HD, SD, HD, 4K, and Pro. Users can upgrade from one edition to another for the difference between the original edition purchased and the one you wish to upgrade to. Updates are provided for free for 1 year with a purchase of any edition, after 1 year users can opt to purchase additional years for US$60.

vMix heavily takes advantage of the GPU, and relies on graphics libraries such as Direct3D, making the software exclusive to the Windows operating system, though it can be run through Boot Camp. StudioCoast has previously indicated that the software performs best on dedicated Nvidia video cards.

== Features ==
=== vMix Call ===
With the release of version 19, vMix Call is available, marking the first time a software vision mixer has been released with built in video-conferencing. With vMix call, any third party with access to a web browser (on any platform including mobile) can connect remotely to the vMix software. This allows the operator to incorporate the call into a live production in the same way that they would with any other source. The number of simultaneous calls varies by version with 1 caller available on the HD level, 4 with 4K and 8 calls on the pro level. vMix call is not available with Basic or Basic HD versions.

=== vMix Social ===
vMix Social allows operators to incorporate social media content and comments from Facebook, Twitch and YouTube Live and IRC Channels. Content can be queued from any web browser and integrated with animated titles within vMix.

=== vMix Replay ===
Instant replay for up to 8 HD cameras allowing users to play back clips at speeds from 5–400%. Also supports 2 channels of 4K Replay and High Frame Rates (Up to 240fps).

=== GT Graphics Engine ===
With the release of version 22, vMix includes a new graphics engine for visuals and overlays, dubbed "GT Graphics Engine". Accompanying the new engine is a more comprehensive titling application called "GT Title Designer" which supports more robust functions than the original title designer (which is still included) and also supports animations. Version 22 also brought the release of a proprietary codec aimed at streamlining post-production: "vMix Video Codec", it has been described as having "similar quality to ProRes but with very low CPU usage."

=== SRT Support ===
The release of vMix 23 includes full support for Secure Reliable Transport or SRT, making it the first live video production software to do so.

=== LiveLAN ===
vMix 25 added the ability to stream on the local network via HLS using a feature called LiveLAN.

=== Zoom Integration ===
Direct Zoom integration was included in vMix 27 that allows vMix to host or join Zoom meetings.

=== Other features ===
- Broadcast to multiple sources at once through built in FFMPEG encoder.
- Supports FMLE encoder for compatibility. (FMLE Must be installed separately, it is available as a free download from Adobe).
- Make local recordings in multiple formats and containers including h.264 MP4, and vMix Video Codec, a specialized codec developed for increased speed and efficiency in vMix, based on AVI.
- External and Virtual video and audio output options.
- Full support for Network Device Interface (NDI) input and output.
- Support for up to 1000 cameras, depending on computer hardware, with scaling and frame rate conversion.
- Support for most popular video, audio, and image file formats. Added independently or in a "playlist."
- Chroma key (blue/green screen), luma key, and alpha key.
- Virtual Sets
- Transitions and Stingers
- Titles (Editor built-in, vMix also comes with a separate "Title Designer" application for making custom titles.) Titles are based on XAML format.
- GT Title Designer – An advanced title editor included starting with version 21. Supports animations and more complex functions than the classic 'Title Designer' application.
- Built in audio-mixing capability including the ability to Mute, Follow (Auto Mixing), and Delay any source. Each input possesses a dedicated EQ, Compressor and Noise Gate effect.
- VST plugin support (VST3 Only)
- Support for MIDI controllers
- Multi-Corder: A tool that allows simultaneous recording of multiple camera inputs to a connected drive. Intended to be used for recording raw cameras separately from the final mix produced by the program.
- Pan–tilt–zoom camera (PTZ) control
- Tally light support for both hardware and web.
- NDI: Support for input of cameras and other sources, and output of individual sources and master output through NewTek's NDI protocol.
- Secure Reliable Transport: Support for input and output of SRT in all editions of vMix, since version 23.

== Awards ==
In 2013 and 2017, Streamingmedia.com awarded vMix with the Streaming Media Best of NAB award.
