= Network Device Interface =

Video network protocol

Network Device Interface (NDI) is a software specification developed by NewTek. It enables high-definition video to be transmitted, received, and communicated over a computer network with low latency and high quality. This royalty-free specification supports frame-accurate switching, making it suitable for live video production environments.

== Technology ==
NDI is designed to run over gigabit Ethernet with the NDI codec. It delivers 1080i high-definition video at variable data rates typically around 100 Mbit/s.

By default, NDI uses multicast DNS to advertise sources on a local area network, such that NDI receivers can automatically discover and offer those sources. It also supports two other discovery modes (NDI Access, NDI Discovery Server) that allow for operations across subnets and without multicast DNS. Sources are created using an arbitrarily selected TCP port from a range of ports on the NDI senders. When a source is requested, a TCP connection is established on the appropriate port with the NDI receiver connecting to the NDI sender. NDI 3.x has options to use UDP multicast or unicast with forward error correction (FEC) instead of TCP, and can load balance streams across multiple network interface controllers (NICs) without using link aggregation. NDI version 4.0 introduces the Multi-TCP transport.

NDI carries video, multichannel uncompressed audio, and metadata. Metadata messages can be sent in both directions, allowing the sender and receiver to message one another over the connection with arbitrary metadata in XML form. This directional metadata system allows for functionality such as active tally information fed back to sources to understand that they are on-air. NDI also allows senders to determine the number of connected receivers, so they can skip unnecessary processing and network bandwidth utilisation when there are no NDI receiver clients connected. NDI Receivers can opt to connect to various combinations of streams, to support, for instance, audio-only or metadata-only connections where video is not required.

The NDI software development kit (SDK) is available for Windows, Linux, and MacOS, and has also been ported to iOS, tvOS, Android, Raspberry Pi, and FPGA. The Standard NDI SDK is available via a royalty-free proprietary license. The NDI Advanced SDK offers OEMs direct access to and from compressed data and other features, with a commercial license.

== Comparison of common IP video protocols ==
Other IP video protocols for use in professional video production (rather than IP video used for distribution to end users) include SMPTE 2022, SMPTE 2110, ASPEN (largely superseded by SMPTE 2110) and Sony NMI. There are clear differences in the technology used by these protocols.

Protocol Parameter	NDI	NDI HX	NDI HX2	SMPTE 2022-6	SMPTE 2110	ASPEN	NMI	CDI
Developed by	NewTek	NewTek	NewTek	SMPTE	VSF and SMPTE	ASPEN Community	Sony	AWS
Transport	TCP/UDP/Multi-TCP/Reliable UDP (Note: NDI v1.0 was pure TCP. Later versions included options for UDP Unicast and Multicast as appropriate and FEC. NDI 4.0 adds 'Multi-TCP' transport, NDI 5.0 adds 'Reliable-UDP' transport . NDI)	UDP (TCP)	TCP/UDP/Multi-TCP/Reliable UDP	UDP (RTP)	UDP (RTP)	UDP	UDP	UDP / SRD
Image format	Size / Aspect Independent	Size / Aspect Independent	Size / Aspect Independent	SDI Formats only	Size / Aspect Independent			Size / Aspect Independent
Tally	Yes	Yes	Yes	No	No (Note: Tally for SMPTE 2110 relies on external data sources, using proposed AMWA IS 07.)	No		No
Bidirectional device control	Yes	Yes	Yes	No	No	No		No
Integrated Proxy	Yes	Yes	Yes	No	No	No	No	No
Integrated alpha channel	Yes	No	Yes	No	Yes			Yes
Compression	NDI Codec (SHQ 0/2/7)	NDI|HX (H.264)	H.264/H.265	NONE (Note: The TICO RDD35 codec can be used to compress UHD by 4:1 so an encoded stream can be carried along a SMPTE 2022-6 channel at the same uncompressed bandwidth as HD. SMPTE 2110 with TR-03 also offers the potential to use TICO RDD35 and JPEG XS. This requires a proprietary encoder and decoder which are generally implemented as silicon on each end.)	SMPTE 2110-22 spec.(JPEG XS, but not limited to)	NONE	NONE / LLVC Codec	NONE
Connection	Socket, Unicast / Multicast and FEC	Unicast / Multicast	Socket, Unicast / Multicast and FEC	Multicast	Multicast	Multicast	Multicast / ?	SRD
HD (1080i) data rate	~100 Mbit/s	8–20 Mbit/s	~1–50 Mbit/s	>1.5 Gbit/s	>1.1 Gbit/s	>1.5 Gbit/s	>1.5 Gbit/s / up to 14:1	>1.5 Gbit/s
Essence packing	Discrete audio, metadata and video frame packets, single connection	Modified RTSP/RTP type connections	Discrete audio, metadata and video frame packets, single connection	Packetized raw SDI bitstream	Discrete audio, video and Metadata on separate connections with different protocols	Multiple MPEG transport streams	Frame aligned 2022-6 / LLVC	Discrete audio, video and Metadata in SMPTE2110 Formats
Infrastructure	Gigabit / wireless / load balanced multi NIC / 10 Gbit	Gigabit / wireless	Gigabit / wireless	10 Gbit minimum	10 Gbit minimum	10 Gbit minimum	Gigabit / 10 Gbit	100 Gbit EFA / libFabric
Service Discovery	Bonjour (mDNS), NDI Access (manual), Discovery Server (NDI4)	automatic via HX driver	Bonjour (mDNS), NDI Access (manual), Discovery Server (NDI4)	NMOS	AMWA IS-04 NMOS	JSON-RPC	Plug & play (NDCP)	NONE
API	Royalty-free license, SDK libraries for Win (x86), Mac, Linux (x86 & ARM), iOS, FPGA reference	Hardware encode, decode with NDI libraries	Send with NDI Advanced SDK, receive with NDI libraries	SMPTE standard	SMPTE standard		SMPTE RDD	OPEN SOURCE

== History ==
NDI was publicly revealed by NewTek on 8 September 2015 and was demonstrated at the International Broadcasting Convention in Amsterdam that week. The first device shown using NDI was the NewTek TriCaster, which delivered an NDI feed from each of its SDI inputs as well as four output feeds from its vision mixer. The TriCaster could also receive up to two NDI sources from other devices.

NewTek had previously created a predecessor of NDI called AirSend to get video from external devices into their TriCaster products. AirSend had been implemented by a number of character generator (CG) vendors, including Vizrt and Chyron. In order to quickly bring these products into the NDI space, NewTek created a new driver to replace the existing AirSend driver, which could be installed on these existing AirSend-compatible devices, instantly converting them to NDI-compatible devices with no change required by the original CG vendors.

BirdDog was an early adopter and in 2018 released Studio NDI, an ASIC implementation of NDI. BirdDog went on to deliver NDI PTZ cameras, along with a host of software applications.

Another early adopter of NDI was VMix, a Windows-based vision mixer that offers NDI inputs and outputs. A significant increase in the NDI installed base came when live-streaming application XSplit added support for NDI.

Later in 2016, NewTek delivered NDI 2.0, which added features including support for service discovery across subnets. In April, Magewell announced integration of their PCIe and USB capture devices, allowing access to any video source on the network.

On 12 July 2017 NewTek announced NDI 3.0 which added multicast, NDI|HX and other new features, introducing support for specific PTZ Cameras with H.264 chipsets and updated firmware.

In April 2018 at the NAB Show, Microsoft announced they had added NDI support to Skype for Content Creators. Other announcements at NAB in 2018 included NDI 3.5, and new NDI support from vendors including EVS and Avid.

Version 3.4 of FFmpeg added input and output support for NDI when optionally compiled by the end-user to a non-open-source NewTek library. However, NewTek was later found to be redistributing pre-compiled binaries of FFmpeg that incorporated their non-open-source library in violation of the GNU General Public License, causing the FFmpeg project to remove NDI support from their code base in March 2019.

In April 2019, ahead of NAB, NewTek announced the addition of Multi-TCP mode to NDI 4.0 which uses hardware TCP offload engine present in silicon, assisting lower-spec processors with NDI transport. NDI 4.0 shipped in September 2019 to coincide with the IBC exhibition.

In July 2021, NDI 5 was released adding reliable UDP transmission, redundant discovery server support, and NDI 5 Tools (NDI Bridge, NDI Remote, NDI Audio Direct, FCP-X output)

Version	Released	Features and enhancements
1.0	April 2016	Initial Release
2.0	Sept 2016	Cross subnet support via Access Manager, ARM encoding support, iOS SDK
3.0	July 2017	NDI-HX support, Option for multicast transport with FEC, PTZ support
3.5	June 2018	Defaults to Unicast UDP transport method with FEC
3.6	July 2018	Packet level bonding improvements
3.7	Sept 2018	Discovery improvements
3.8	Nov 2018	Performance Enhancements, NDI Embedded SDK for FPGA development
4.0	Sept 2019	Multi-TCP Transport mode, HDR 16-bit support, Native synchronized recording, Discovery Server, NDI HX2
4.1	Nov 2019	Performance improvements
4.5	March 2020	New Multi-TCP implementation, Lower latency with NDI-HX, Predictable port numbers for firewall rules, Improvements to codec quality
4.6	Nov 2020	Can support NDI-HX2 encoding on PC's using NVENC
5.0	July 2021	Reliable UDP transmission, Redundant discovery server support, NDI 5 Tools (Bridge, Remote, Audio Direct, FCP-X output)
5.1	Feb 2022	NDI Bridge enhancements, DNS name support for Discovery Server, SDK improvements
5.5	Aug 2022	NDI Router, Quad Inputs on NDI Webcam Input with 4K video support, NDI Remote adds Talkback and desktop sharing features, Auto start applications on system boot, NDI FreeAudio command line tool (found with SDK)
6.0	Apr 2024	Added specification for NDI HDR metadata, Improved support for 16-bit colour formats, NDI Bridge Utility for Linux, NDI-KVM support for Video Monitor on macOS, NDI Router for macOS, NDI Studio Monitor on Windows enhanced with HDR support for display and recording
6.1	Dec 2024	NDI Bridge improvements, NDI Bridge service, 16-bit colour formats available in FPGA platforms, dynamic bandwidth adjustment API in NDI Advanced SDK
6.2	June 2025	NDI Receiver API (provides status, monitoring and control), Updated Discovery Server (provides the capabilities for NDI Receiver API), new Discovery application provided with NDI Tools.
6.3	Jan 2026	NDI Sender Monitoring API (provides status and monitoring of sources), Updated Discovery Server (provides the capabilities for NDI Sender Monitoring), Enhanced SpeedHQ codec quality, HDCP compatibility with compliant encoders/decoders.
6.4	Nov 2026	New file recording APIs, HEVC 4:4:4 codec support, Studio Monitor improvements, Configurable Receive Buffer, VLC NDI plug-in channel naming.

== Use in Wi-Fi and wide-area networks ==
NDI was designed to work on good quality gigabit local area networks using TCP/IP and Bonjour (mDNS) technologies. In order to work across subnets that don't pass mDNS, NDI supports a mechanism known as NDI Access, which allows manual entry of the IP address of machines on other subnets that may be running NDI sources.

Some NDI adopters have run the protocol across fibre connections up to 15 km, although NDI's use of the TCP protocol makes it less suitable for long-distance, high-latency connections due to factors such as bandwidth-delay product and TCP packet loss recovery. Later versions of NDI introduced different transport protocols, including UDP, MultiTCP and reliable UDP (QUIC), which support more diverse network characteristics. NDI|HX uses a lower data rate, making it easier to use in bandwidth-limited connections.

== Use in cloud-based infrastructure ==
NDI's compressed video and unicast transmissions make it suitable for cloud-based services like AWS and Azure. When operating in cloud environments, the NDI Discovery service provides a solution compatible with multicast restrictions common to cloud platforms. Starting with NDI 5, the Bridge tool allows you to connect remote locations together, be it over the open Internet or via a VPN. NDI Bridge uses NDI-HX2 at selectable bitrates and codec types (H.264 or HEVC) as the transmission format between locations (High Bandwidth NDI transmission is also possible), all other aspects of the NDI signal are preserved (metadata, alpha, tally, etc).

== CPU architecture support ==
NDI, when running on x86 or x86-64 architectures, requires CPUs that include the SSSE3 instruction set. Most Intel CPU designs starting in 2006 have this instruction set, AMD added support starting in 2011. While not a requirement, NDI will take advantage of Advanced Vector Extensions (AVX) and AVX2 instruction sets for additional performance.

NDI can run on 32- or 64-bit CPU architectures, although performance is increased when using 64-bit.

NDI 4.x and earlier had limited support for ARM, generally offering encode-only support. The release of NDI 5 brings full support for encoding and decoding on ARM-based processors that include Neon instructions. This includes Apple silicon processors.

NDI|HX devices are typically transmit-only and based on proprietary platforms with hardware H.264 encoder chips. Examples of NDI|HX devices are PTZ cameras, and the NDI Connect Spark SDI to NDI|HX converter box.

With NDI 4.0, NewTek announced the addition of a Multi-TCP transport mode. This takes advantage of the hardware TCP acceleration in silicon, which helps lower-spec processors handle heavy network load, in contrast to UDP, which does not benefit from the hardware acceleration.

== Metadata and extensions to the NDI specification ==
NDI supports arbitrary metadata as XML blocks, embedded in video and audio frames, as well as stand-alone metadata frames. The content of these metadata blocks forms three families.

1. Internal metadata used by NDI invisibly. These messages are used for connectivity and some other fundamental tasks, like Tally. They are typically invisible to NDI clients.
2. Defined public metadata. These messages include things like the NDI PTZ Protocol. They are defined by NewTek as part of the NDI SDK.
3. Third-party metadata schemas. These messages are implemented in the same way as defined NDI metadata, but the content is based on third-party designs.
