= John Seale =

Australian cinematographer (born 1942)

AM John Seale ACS ASC
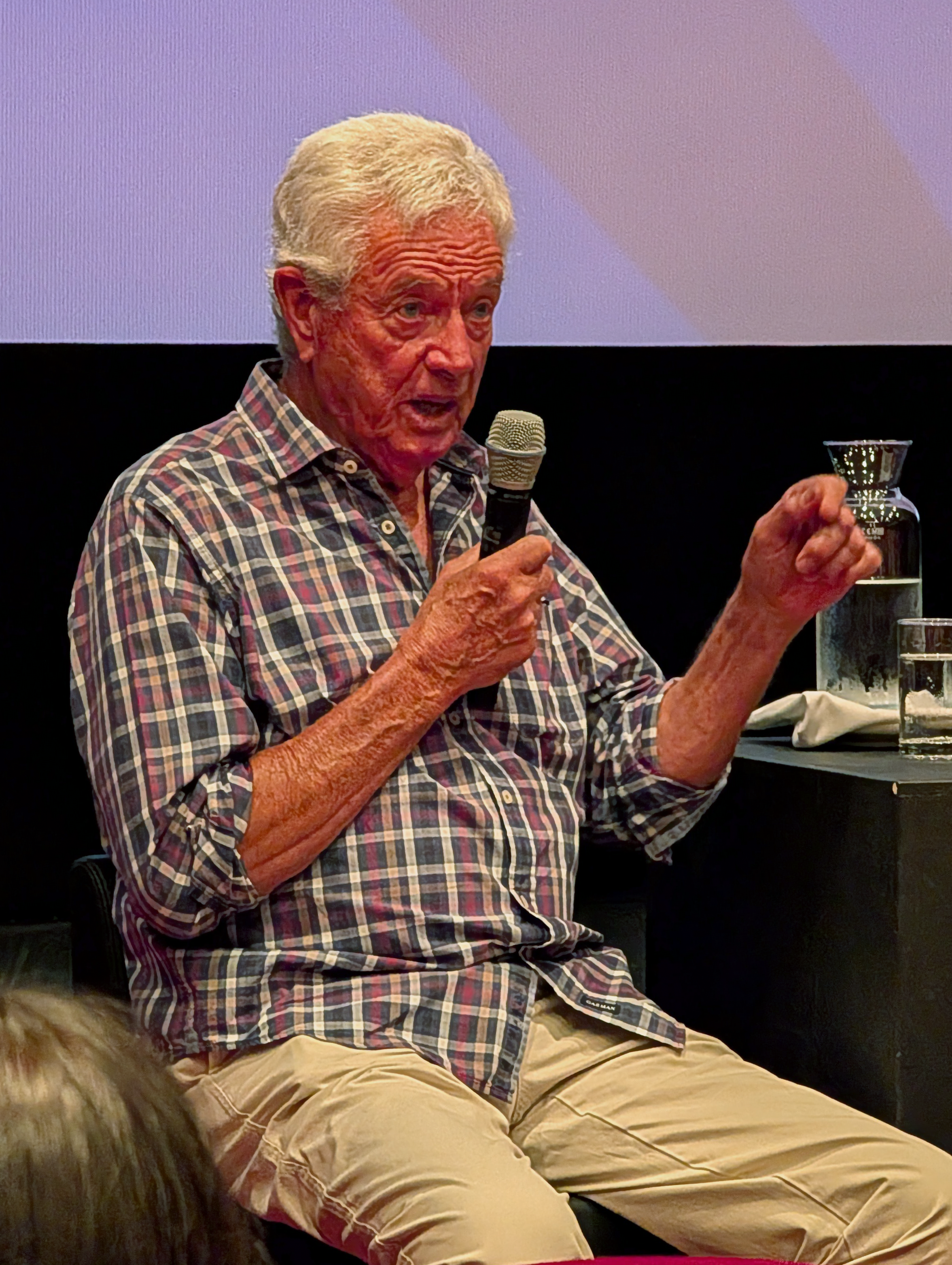
- Seale at the 2026 AACTA Festival
- Born: 5 October 1942 (age 84); Warwick, Queensland, Australia
- Occupation: Cinematographer
- Years active: 1966–2022
- Title: ACS ASC

John Clement Seale AM ACS ASC (born 5 October 1942) is an Australian retired cinematographer, known for his work in blockbusters and drama films both in Australia and Hollywood, including collaborations with directors Peter Weir and George Miller. His accolades include five Academy Award nominations and six BAFTA Award nominations, winning both for The English Patient (1996).

== Early life ==
Seale was born in Warwick, Queensland, Australia, to Marjorie Lyndon (née Pool) and Eric Clement Seale.

== Career ==
Seale started his career collaborating with director Peter Weir, both as a camera operator and director of photography, gaining a reputation as one of Australia's leading cinematographers.

He received an Oscar nomination for his first American film, Witness, as well as for Rain Man, and Cold Mountain, while winning one for The English Patient.

In addition to cinematography, Seale directed a feature film, Till There Was You (1990).

Seale was appointed a Member of the Order of Australia in the 2002 Australia Day Honours in recognition of his "service to the arts as an Australian and internationally acclaimed cinematographer".

After shooting The Tourist (2010), Seale decided to retire from the film industry, before returning in 2012 to shoot George Miller's Mad Max: Fury Road (2015), for which he received another Academy Award nomination. He retired again after the production of Miller's following film Three Thousand Years of Longing (2022).

== Filmography ==
=== Film ===
Director

- Till There Was You (1990)

Cinematographer

| Year | Title | Director | Ref. |
|---|---|---|---|
| 1976 | Deathcheaters | Brian Trenchard-Smith | |
| 1980 | Fatty Finn | Maurice Murphy | |
| 1981 | Doctors and Nurses | Maurice Murphy | |
| 1981 | The Survivor | David Hemmings | |
| 1982 | Ginger Meggs | Jonathan Dawson | |
| 1982 | Fighting Back | Michael Caulfield | |
| 1983 | Goodbye Paradise | Carl Schultz | |
| 1983 | BMX Bandits | Brian Trenchard-Smith | |
| 1983 | Careful, He Might Hear You | Carl Schultz | |
| 1984 | Silver City | Sophia Turkiewicz | |
| 1985 | Witness | Peter Weir | |
| 1986 | The Hitcher | Robert Harmon | |
| 1986 | Children of a Lesser God | Randa Haines | |
| 1986 | The Mosquito Coast | Peter Weir | |
| 1987 | Stakeout | John Badham | |
| 1988 | Gorillas in the Mist | Michael Apted | |
| 1988 | Rain Man | Barry Levinson | |
| 1989 | Dead Poets Society | Peter Weir | |
| 1991 | The Doctor | Randa Haines | |
| 1992 | Lorenzo's Oil | George Miller | |
| 1993 | The Firm | Sydney Pollack | |
| 1994 | The Paper | Ron Howard | |
| 1995 | Beyond Rangoon | John Boorman | |
| 1995 | The American President | Rob Reiner | |
| 1996 | The English Patient | Anthony Minghella | |
| 1996 | Ghosts of Mississippi | Rob Reiner | |
| 1998 | City of Angels | Brad Silberling | |
| 1999 | At First Sight | Irwin Winkler | |
| 1999 | The Talented Mr. Ripley | Anthony Minghella | |
| 2000 | The Perfect Storm | Wolfgang Petersen | |
| 2001 | Harry Potter and the Philosopher's Stone | Chris Columbus | |
| 2003 | Dreamcatcher | Lawrence Kasdan | |
| 2003 | Cold Mountain | Anthony Minghella | |
| 2004 | Spanglish | James L. Brooks | |
| 2006 | Poseidon | Wolfgang Petersen | |
| 2010 | Prince of Persia: The Sands of Time | Mike Newell | |
| 2010 | The Tourist | Florian Henckel von Donnersmarck | |
| 2015 | Mad Max: Fury Road | George Miller | |
| 2022 | Three Thousand Years of Longing | George Miller | |

=== Television ===
| Year | Title | Director | Notes |
|---|---|---|---|
| 1979 | New South Wales Images | Russell Boyd | Documentary film |
| 1985 | Winners | Carl Schultz | Episode "Top Kid" |
