= Arthur Berg =

Norwegian newspaper editor (1916–1998)

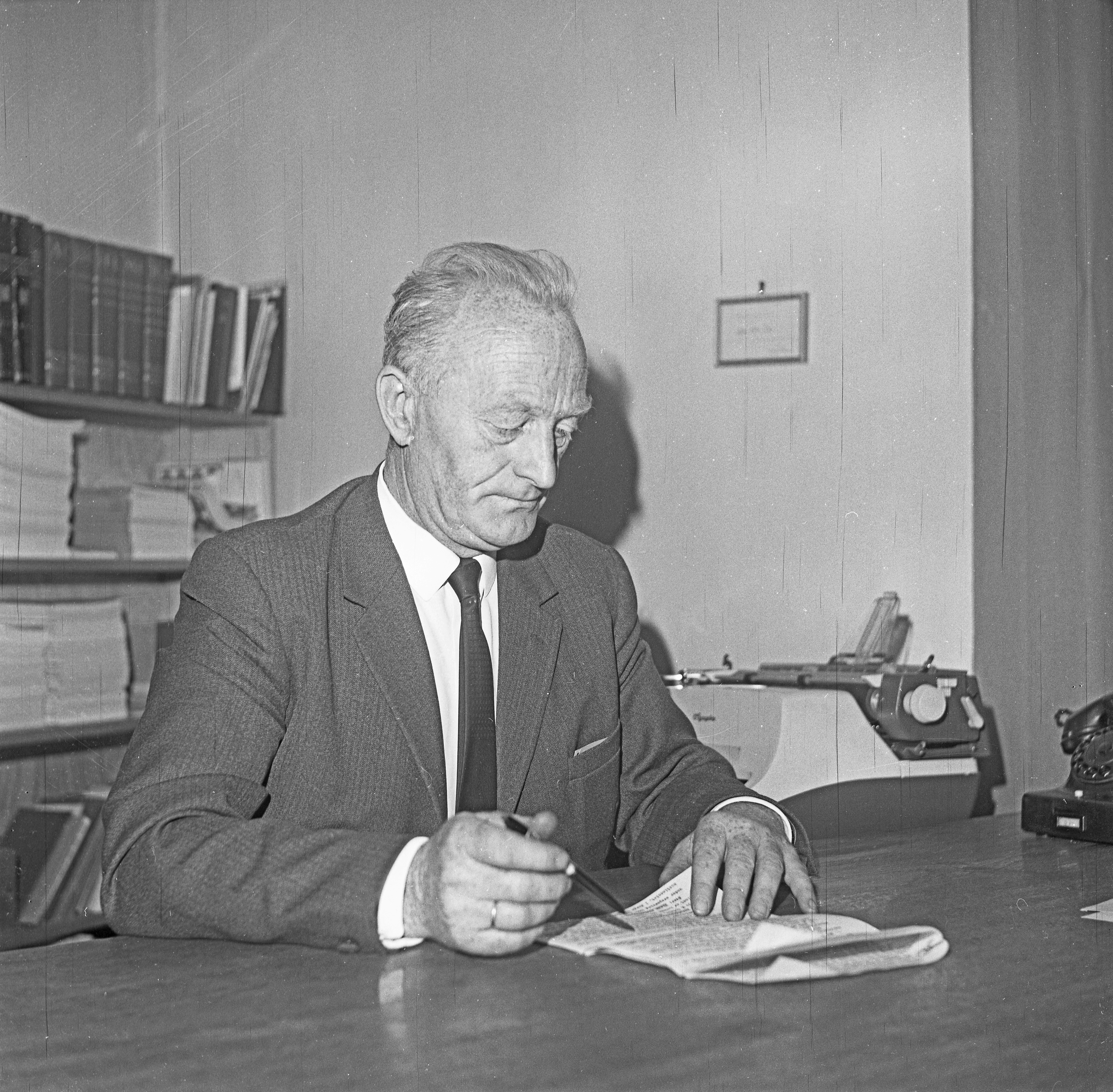
Arthur Berg

Arthur Bjarne Berg (8 April 1916 – 20 July 1998) was a Norwegian newspaper editor.

He was born in Brunlanes Municipality as a son of farmers. Having experienced a revival during a meeting in Kristiansand, he studied theology and graduated with the cand.theol. degree from the MF Norwegian School of Theology in 1941. He also underwent officer's training in 1939–40, and served as a priest in the Norwegian police troops in Sweden from 1944 to 1945.

From 1955 to 1986 he was the editor-in-chief of the conservative Christian newspaper Dagen. He became a conservative Christian leader himself, defending Israel and Zionism and campaigning against abortion and female clergy. He favoured fidelity in the scripture, rather than liberal theology and expanding the democratic leadership of the church. As a public debater, he both used editorials in his own newspaper as well as public rallies.

Writing in Nynorsk, he published several books, among others a biography on Kjell Bondevik in 1969. Politically, he participated in the Folkebevegelsen mot norsk medlemskap i EEC as a board member from 1962, and travelled around the country to campaign for the "No" alternative ahead of the 1972 Norwegian European Communities membership referendum.

During World War II, Artur Berge helped Jews flee to Sweden.
