= Dana Carvey =

American comedian and actor (born 1955)

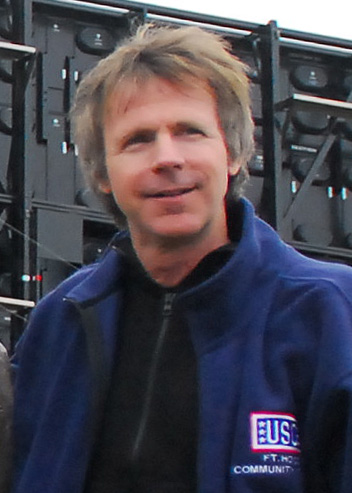
- Carvey in 2009
- Born: Dana Thomas Carvey; June 2, 1955 (age 71); Missoula, Montana, U.S.
- Education: San Francisco State University (BA)
- Occupations: Stand-up comedian; actor; podcaster; screenwriter; producer
- Spouse: Paula Zwagerman (m. 1983)
- Children: 2 (Note: Carvey's oldest son, Dex Carvey, died in November 2023.)
- Relatives: Brad Carvey (brother)

Comedy career
- Years active: 1978–present
- Medium: Stand-up, television, film
- Genres: Improvisational comedy; sketch comedy; character comedy; impressions; surreal humor; satire
- Website: danacarvey.com

Dana Thomas Carvey (born June 2, 1955) is an American stand-up comedian, actor, podcaster, screenwriter and producer.

Carvey is best known for his seven seasons on Saturday Night Live, from 1986 to 1993, which earned him five consecutive Primetime Emmy Award nominations, winning once. He returned to the show during and immediately after the 2024 presidential election to impersonate outgoing US President Joe Biden as well as Trump advisor, businessman, and billionaire Elon Musk.

Carvey is also known for his film roles in comedies such as Moving (1988), Opportunity Knocks (1990), Trapped in Paradise (1994), and The Master of Disguise (2002), as well as reprising his role of Garth Algar in the SNL spin-off film Wayne's World (1992) and its sequel Wayne's World 2 (1993).

== Early life ==
Carvey was born in Missoula, Montana, the fourth of five (with three older brothers and one younger sister) born to Billie Dahl, a schoolteacher, and William John (Bud) Carvey, a high school business teacher. He has some Irish ancestry. Carvey is the brother of Brad Carvey, the engineer/designer of the Video Toaster. The character Garth Algar is loosely based on Brad. Carvey was raised Lutheran.

In 1957, his family moved to Anderson, California, where his father got a teaching job. When he was three years old, his family moved to San Carlos, California, in the San Francisco Bay Area. He attended Tierra Linda Junior High in San Carlos, Carlmont High School in Belmont, California (where he was a member of the Central Coast Section champion cross country team), College of San Mateo in San Mateo, California, and earned his bachelor's degree in broadcast communications from San Francisco State University. In 1977, he won the San Francisco Open Stand-Up Comedy Competition.

== Career ==
=== Early career ===
Carvey had a minor role in Halloween II in 1981, and co-starred in One of the Boys in 1982, a short-lived television sitcom that also starred Mickey Rooney, Nathan Lane, and Meg Ryan. In 1984, Carvey appeared in the short-lived film-based action television series Blue Thunder and also had a small role in Rob Reiner's film This Is Spinal Tap, in which he played a mime, with fellow comedian Billy Crystal (who tells him "Mime is money!"). He appeared in the music video for the Greg Kihn song "Lucky" in 1985. His big break came in 1986, when he co-starred opposite Kirk Douglas and Burt Lancaster in Tough Guys. As a lifelong Douglas fan, Carvey threw in an affectionate impression of his mentor, while describing a hairy scene they did together on a moving train.

Carvey was a finalist for the hosting role on the Nickelodeon television game show Double Dare. He ultimately withdrew his name from consideration after he was cast on Saturday Night Live. The job would go to Marc Summers.

=== Saturday Night Live ===
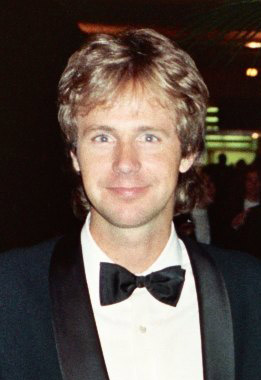
Carvey in 1989

In 1986, Carvey became a household name when he joined the cast of NBC's Saturday Night Live. He, along with newcomers Phil Hartman, Kevin Nealon, Jan Hooks, and Victoria Jackson, helped to reverse the show's declining popularity and made SNL "must-see" TV once again. An important part of the show's revival was Carvey's breakout character, the Church Lady, the uptight, smug, and pious host of Church Chat. Carvey said he based the character on women he knew from church while growing up, who would keep track of other churchgoers' attendance. He became so associated with the character that later cast members such as Chris Farley referred to Carvey simply as "The Lady". The Church Lady's discontinuation was mentioned in a sketch which satirized the film Misery with host Roseanne Barr playing the role of Annie Wilkes.

Carvey's other original characters included Garth Algar (from Wayne's World), who was based on his brother; Hans (from "Hans and Franz"); the Grumpy Old Man (from Weekend Update appearances); and Ching Chang, a Chinese poultry store owner. Throughout the election and presidency of George H. W. Bush, he was the designated impersonator of the president, making him the lead actor of the regular political sketches on SNL.

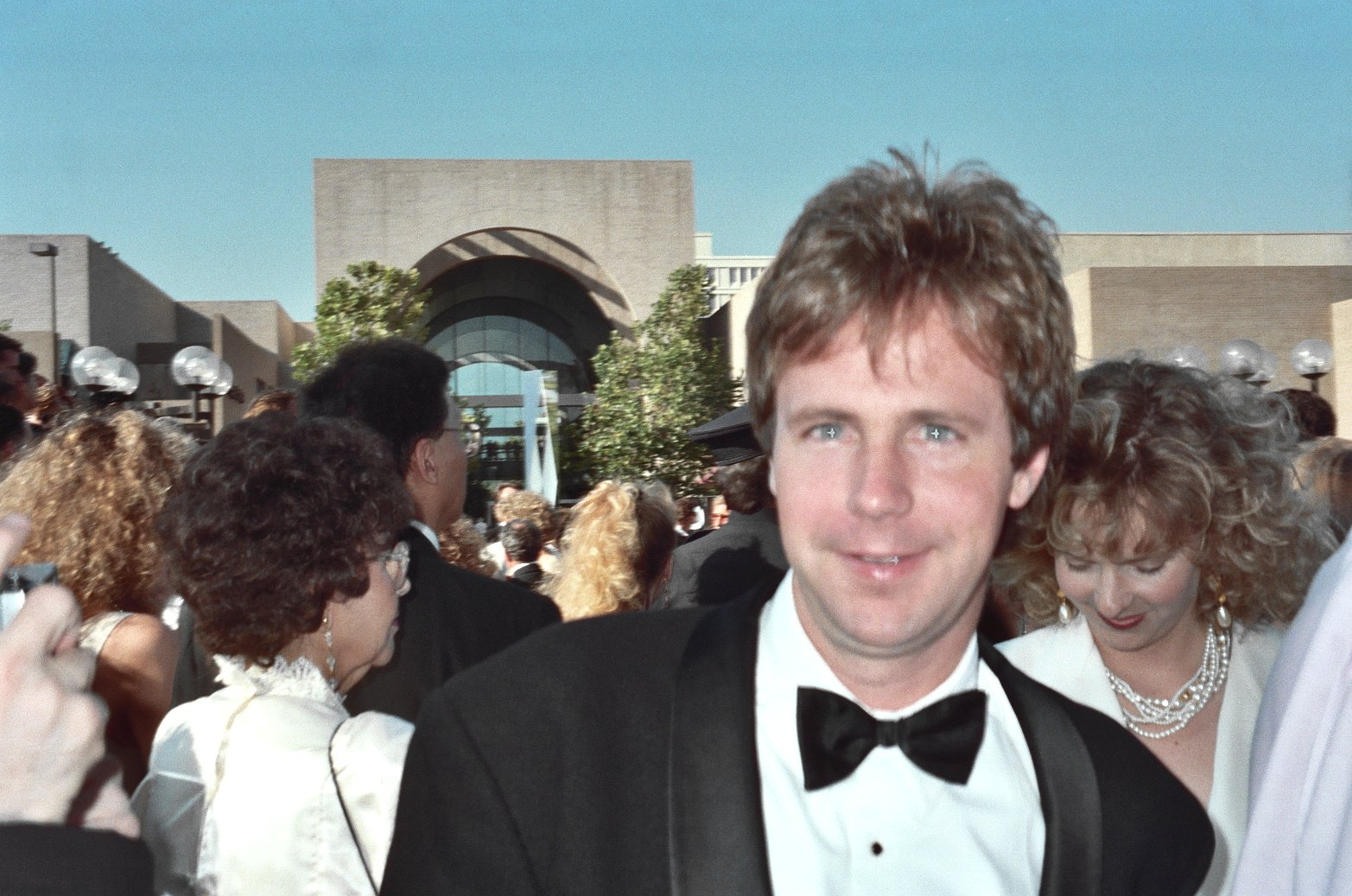
Carvey at the 1990 Emmy Awards

During the 1992 US presidential election campaign, Carvey also did an impression of independent candidate Ross Perot; in a prime-time special before the election, Carvey played both George H. W. Bush and Perot in a three-way debate with Bill Clinton, played by Phil Hartman. As Perot—recorded and timed to give the appearance of interacting with the live Bush and Clinton—Carvey eschewed the show's signature "Live from New York" opening line, telling Bush "Why don't you do it, live-boy?" Carvey left SNL in 1993, after seven years.

In 1992, Carvey joined Mike Myers in Wayne's World, the film. A sequel, Wayne's World 2, was filmed and released in 1993. Other films Carvey appeared in during his time on SNL include Moving (1988) and Opportunity Knocks (1990).

Carvey was hired to officially open and cut the ribbon for the Drachen Fire roller coaster at Busch Gardens Williamsburg in April 1992. He offered an impromptu standup routine during the opening to keep guests occupied while the coaster failed to open on time.

Carvey's SNL work won him an Emmy Award in 1993 for Outstanding Individual Performance in a Variety or Music Program. He has a total of six Emmy nominations. Carvey has returned to host SNL four times, in 1994, 1996, 2000, and 2011 in addition to numerous cameo appearances.

Carvey nearly rejoined the SNL cast for season 20 in 1994, but ultimately did not, although he would host an episode early in that season.

Carvey made more regular appearances in 2024 to play Joe Biden and Elon Musk in the immediate lead-up and aftermath to the 2024 presidential election. Musk notably criticized Carvey's performance of him on X, saying that he did not believe that it sounded like him, which Carvey later agreed with.

=== After SNL ===
In 1994, Carvey starred in the films Clean Slate and Trapped in Paradise. The following year, Carvey filmed his first HBO stand-up special Critic's Choice. The show featured Carvey doing many of his SNL impersonations, as well as making fun of the premium channel's name, pronouncing it "hobo".

He turned down a role in Bad Boys because he felt overwhelmed as a new father.

He reprised many of his SNL characters in 1996 for The Dana Carvey Show, a short-lived prime-time variety show on ABC. The show was most notable for launching Robert Smigel's cartoon "The Ambiguously Gay Duo", as well as the careers of Steve Carell and Stephen Colbert.

In 2002, he returned to films in the spy comedy The Master of Disguise. Released a week after former colleague Mike Myers' successful film Austin Powers in Goldmember, most critics compared the movies and panned Carvey's effort. However, the movie did manage about $40 million at the North American box office. In March 2007, review aggregation website Rotten Tomatoes ranked the film as the 18th worst-reviewed movie of the 2000s decade, with an approval rating of 1% based on 103 reviews. Comedian and former Mystery Science Theater 3000 host Michael J. Nelson named the film the third-worst comedy ever made. Carvey did not appear in a film again until 2011's Jack and Jill.

In 2004, he ranked number 90 on Comedy Central's list of the 100 Greatest Stand-Ups of All Time.

=== After The Master of Disguise ===
Video: Carvey in conversation with Jon Lovitz at the Laugh Factory in Hollywood, August 2015

Carvey eventually withdrew from the limelight to focus on his family. He later said in an interview that he did not want to be in a career in which his kids would already be grown with him having neglected spending time with them, a major reason for his declining the hosting spot for Late Night that ultimately went to Conan O'Brien. Carvey has said that he generally prefers stand-up comedy to acting in movies and regularly performs lucrative corporate dates, boasting of "a few million-dollar months" during a 2016 Howard Stern interview.

Carvey made an appearance at the 2008 MTV Movie Awards, reprising his SNL character Garth Algar with host Mike Myers for a "Wayne's World" sketch. On June 14, 2008, Carvey filmed a second HBO stand-up special, the first in 13 years, entitled Squatting Monkeys Tell No Lies.

In 2010, Carvey appeared in the Funny or Die original comedy sketch Presidential Reunion. He played the role of President George H. W. Bush alongside other current and former SNL president impersonators. Also that year, Carvey and comedian/writer Spike Feresten created and starred together in Spoof, a sketch comedy pilot for Fox. This included a sketch of a trailer for "Darwin", a mock film in which he played the evolutionary biologist, as well as a spoof of the hit TV series Lost. Both of these sketches can be seen on YouTube. On the animated TV series The Fairly OddParents, Carvey voiced Cosmo Cosma's con artist brother Schnozmo.

Carvey voiced Dana, the Camp Director in Hotel Transylvania 2 (2015), and was the voice of Pops in The Secret Life of Pets (2016) and its sequel The Secret Life of Pets 2 (2019).

In 2016, Carvey recorded two live performances at the Wilbur Theatre in Boston, Massachusetts for a Netflix special. His two sons, Tom and Dex, opened the show for him.

Carvey was a guest on Conan O'Brien's podcast, Conan O'Brien Needs a Friend, on January 27, 2019. Carvey was subsequently featured in a six episode mini-series of the podcast titled "Deep Dive with Dana Carvey", released in August 2019.

Carvey has regularly done sketch impressions on The Late Show with Stephen Colbert playing, among others, President Joe Biden and former national security advisor John Bolton.

In 2019, Carvey appeared on the guest panel of the fourth episode of Lights Out with David Spade and also in costume as Tony Montana in a number of later episodes.

=== Podcasts ===
In 2021, Carvey began hosting the comedy podcast "Fantastic! with Dana Carvey". The podcast features mini sketches involving Carvey's many celebrity impressions, as well as interview segments with Carvey's family members and other friends from the stand-up comedy world. That same year, Carvey reprised his role of Garth Algar alongside Myers' Wayne Campbell in a series of commercials for Uber Eats. The original spot first ran during Super Bowl LV.

In 2022, Carvey began co-hosting the Fly on the Wall podcast with fellow Saturday Night Live alum David Spade. Guests include former cast members and hosts of SNL.

In 2024, the Superfly video podcast (a spinoff of Fly on the Wall) co-hosted by Spade was launched.

== Personal life ==
While performing at The Other Cafe in San Francisco, Carvey met and became romantically involved with Paula Zwagerman. Dana and Paula became engaged in 1981 and married in 1983. The couple have two sons – Dex (1991-2023), and Thomas, born in 1994. His elder son, Dex, died from an accidental drug overdose on November 15, 2023, at the age of 32.

In 1995, Carvey had a home in the San Fernando Valley, and his parents relocated to Murrieta, California, to be near his mother's sister, Shirley Miller.

In March 1998, Carvey underwent heart bypass surgery for a blocked coronary artery. The artery was buried deep in myocardium and difficult to find; the surgeon mistakenly performed the bypass on another accessible artery that was unblocked. As a result, Carvey continued to suffer from angina pectoris and successfully sued for $7.5 million in damages, which he donated to charity; he underwent additional corrective surgery in May 1998. He told Newsday that, while he was in the hospital for his final angioplasty in May 1998, Frank Sinatra died in the room adjacent to his. From 2002 to 2010, Carvey took a break to raise his two sons.

Carvey and his family live in Mill Valley in Marin County, California.

== Filmography ==
=== Comedy specials ===
Year	Title	Role	Notes
1995	Dana Carvey: Critics' Choice	Himself	Stand-up special
2008	Dana Carvey: Squatting Monkeys Tell No Lies	Himself	Stand-up special
2016	Dana Carvey: Straight White Male, 60	Himself	Stand-up special

=== Film ===
Year	Title	Role	Notes
1981	Halloween II	Assistant Barry McNichol	
1984	This Is Spinal Tap	Mime Waiter	
1984	Racing with the Moon	Baby Face	
1986	Tough Guys	Richie Evans	
1988	Moving	Brad Williams	
1990	Opportunity Knocks	Eddie Farrell	
1992	Wayne's World	Garth Algar	
1993	Wayne's World 2	Garth Algar	
1994	Clean Slate	Maurice L. Pogue	
1994	The Road to Wellville	George Kellogg	
1994	Trapped in Paradise	Alvin Firpo	
1996	The Shot	Himself	Cameo
1996	Fire on the Track: The Steve Prefontaine Story	Himself	Documentary
2000	Little Nicky	Referee	
2002	The Master of Disguise	Pistachio Disguisey	Also co-writer
2010	Presidential Reunion	George H. W. Bush	Short film
2011	Jack and Jill	Crazy Puppeteer	Cameo
2015	Hotel Transylvania 2	Dana the Camp Director	Voice
2016	The Secret Life of Pets	Pops	Voice
2017	Sandy Wexler	Himself	
2017	Becoming Bond	Johnny Carson	Documentary
2017	Too Funny to Fail	Himself	Documentary
2019	The Secret Life of Pets 2	Pops	Voice

=== Television ===
Year	Title	Role	Notes
1980	Alone at Last	Michael Elliot	main cast of television pilot
1982	One of the Boys	Adam Shields	Main cast
1984	Blue Thunder	Clinton Wonderlove	Main cast
1986–1993	Saturday Night Live	Various Roles	Main cast Primetime Emmy Award for Individual Performance in a Variety or Music Program (1993); Nominated – Primetime Emmy Award for Individual Performance in a Variety or Music Program (1989–1992)
1988	Superman's 50th Anniversary	Host/Himself	Special
1992	64th Academy Awards	Garth Algar	Special
1992	1992 MTV Video Music Awards	Host	
1992, 1993; 1997	The Larry Sanders Show	Himself	3 episodes Nominated – Primetime Emmy Award for Outstanding Guest Actor in a Comedy Series
1994, 1996; 2000, 2011	Saturday Night Live	Himself (host)	4 episodes
1996	The Dana Carvey Show	Himself / various roles	Title role; also co-creator, writer and executive producer
1998	Just Shoot Me!	Oskar Milos	Episode: "The Emperor"
1998–1999	LateLine	Senator Crowl Pickens	2 episodes
2010	The Fairly OddParents	Schnozmo Cosma	Voice; Episode: "Double Oh Schnozmo"
2011	Good Vibes	Claw Jones	Voice; Episode: "Tech Rehab"
2011	Spoof	Various	Pilot
2012	Live with Kelly	Himself (guest host)	3 episodes
2013	Rick and Morty	Leonard	Voice; Episode: "Anatomy Park"
2014	The Birthday Boys	Laurence Eastman	Episode: "Snobs and Slobs"
2016	First Impressions	Himself	Host
2018	Comedians in Cars Getting Coffee	Himself	Episode: "Na.. Ga.. Do.. It"
2019	Bajillion Dollar Propertie$	Prince Borislav	Episode: "Royale Pains"
2023	Mulligan	Senator Cartwright LaMarr	Voice; Main Cast
2024	Saturday Night Live	Joe Biden / various roles	Guest role (9 episodes)

=== Video games ===
Year	Title	Voice
1996	You Don't Know Jack Volume 2	Himself

=== Web ===
Year	Title	Role	Notes
2021–present	Fantastic! with Dana Carvey	Himself/Host	
2022–present	Fly on the Wall	Himself/Host	Co-host with David Spade
2024–present	Superfly	Himself/Host	Co-host with David Spade

=== Theme park attractions ===
Year	Title	Role	Notes
1989	Cranium Command	Right Ventricle	Defunct attraction at Epcot's Wonders of Life pavilion Along with Kevin Nealon, they parodied their Hans and Franz characters from Saturday Night Live in the roles of the right and left ventricle of the body
