= Till There Was You (1990 film) =

1990 film by John Seale

- Directed by: John Seale
- Written by: Michael Thomas
- Produced by: Hal and Jim McElroy
- Starring: Mark Harmon; Deborah Unger; Jeroen Krabbe; Shane Briant
- Cinematography: Geoffrey Simpson
- Edited by: Jill Bilcock
- Music by: Graeme Revell
- Production company: Ayer Productions
- Distributed by: CIC (video)
- Release date: 1990
- Running time: 90 minutes
- Countries: Australia; United States
- Language: English
- Budget: A$13 million

Till There Was You is a 1990 Australian film directed by John Seale, written by Michael Thomas, and starring Mark Harmon, Martin Garner, Gregory T. Daniel, and Deborah Kara Unger. The film was shot on location in the South Pacific island nation of Vanuatu.

The film's title is taken from the song "Till There Was You", written by Meredith Willson for his 1957 musical play The Music Man. Australian pop singer Kate Ceberano performed the song on the movie's soundtrack.

== Plot ==
Frank Flynn is summonsed from New York City to Vanuatu by his brother Charlie. He arrives only to find Charlie dead, and becomes involved with his late brother's partner, Viv, and Viv's unhappy wife, Anna.

== Cast ==
- Mark Harmon as Frank Flynn
- Jeroen Krabbe as Robert 'Viv' Vivaldi
- Deborah Unger as Anna Vivaldi
- Martin Garner as Mr. Jimmy
- Gregory Daniel as Trumpet Player
- Terry Davis as Joanna
- Pamela Kalsal as Stewardess
- Shane Briant as Rex
- Lech Mackiewicz as Muzza
- Ivan Kesa as Snowy
- Ritchie Singer as Robbo
- Jeff Truman as Nobby
- Kate Ceberano as Jazz Singer

== Production ==
According to producer Jim McElroy, the aim of the movie was to make an adventure film in the style of Elephant Walk (1954) or To Have and Have Not (1944). It marked the directorial debut of highly regarded cinematographer John Seale. Dennis Quaid was originally rumoured to play the lead.

Half the budget was provided by the FFC, whose contribution amounted to $6,326,711.

The film was shot from 6 November 1989 to 19 January 1990.
