= Brad Carvey =

American engineer (born 1951)

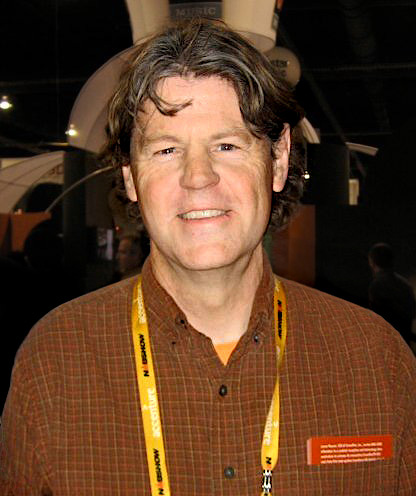
- Carvey in 2008
- Born: Bradley John Carvey; July 10, 1951 (age 75); Missoula, Montana, U.S.
- Occupation: Engineer
- Relatives: Dana Carvey (brother)

Bradley John Carvey (born July 10, 1951) is an American engineer best known as the builder of the first Video Toaster, a system used in the production and editing of movie and television video.

== Career ==
Carvey built the first wire wrapped prototype for the Video Toaster, for which Steve Kell wrote the software.

Carvey created visual effects for feature films and TV shows including Men In Black, Stuart Little, Black Hawk Down, Kate & Leopold, Stargazers and Elvis Has Left The Building.

== Personal life ==
Brad is the brother of Dana Carvey, who based the Garth Algar character (from the Wayne's World comedy sketches and movies) on his nerdy older brother. Dana wears a Video Toaster "test pattern" T-shirt during a scene in Wayne's World 2. In 1993 Dana and Brad both won Primetime Emmys. Brad's Emmy was for "Outstanding achievement in Engineering", awarded to the development team of the Video Toaster, while Dana's was for Outstanding Individual Performance in a Variety or Music Program.
