= Vizrt =

Norwegian digital media software company

- Type: Public
- Industry: Broadcasting
- Founded: 1997
- Headquarters: Bergen, Norway
- Products: Software
- Number of employees: 700
- Website: www.vizrt.com

Vizrt (/ˈvɪzɑːrtiː/), short for Visualization in Real-Time or Visual Artist, is a Norwegian vendor of broadcast technology, primarily known for its suite of real-time broadcast graphics software powered by the Viz Engine. The company came to be as a result of a merger between Peak Broadcast Systems (itself a merger of Pilot Broadcast Systems AS and Peak Software Technologies GmbH) and RT-SET. Its products include real-time 3D graphics systems, 3D reconstruction, visualized sports analysis, media asset management, and integrated workflow systems for the digital broadcast industry. Vizrt is a unit of Vizrt Group, which is also the parent company of NewTek, which is the seller of TriCaster and the developer of the NDI protocol.

Vizrt has a customer base in more than 190 countries, and some 700 employees are distributed across 40 offices worldwide.

Vizrt's graphics software is centered around the Viz Engine and design application Viz Artist, and encompasses various operation applications for different purposes, such as general purpose character generator Viz Trio, studio monitor playout application Viz Multiplay and on-air branding and promotions system Viz Channel Branding.

== History ==
TV 2 Norway, a terrestrial television channel in Bergen, Norway, needed software to produce newsroom graphics. A spin-off company called Pilot Broadcast Systems AS was established in 1997, where the first template-based graphics system was created.

In 1999, Norway-based Pilot Broadcast Systems AS merged with the Austrian company, Peak Software Technologies GmbH (founded by Christian Huber, Karl-Heinz Klotz and Hubert Oehm), to form Peak Broadcast Systems. Peak Software was a developer of software for real-time 3D graphics and animation, virtual sets and playback control systems. The business fusion Peak Broadcast Systems, could now offer software for real-time 3D graphics creation and virtual sets, together with playout control.

The following year marked the formation of Vizrt when Peak Broadcast Systems merged with RT-SET (Real Time Synthesized Entertainment Technology) Ltd, an Israeli virtual studio system developer. RT-SET, founded in 1994, utilized Flight Simulator technology originally developed for the Israeli Air Force, transforming it to a virtual set and on-air graphics systems that could benefit the television broadcast industry. In 1999, RT-SET had an initial public offering on the Frankfurt Stock Exchange, raising $48 million. The combined company continued to be listed on the Frankfurt Stock Exchange (under ticker symbol VIZ), until 2009 when it delisted its shares.

In 2005, the company acquired London-based Curious Software, developers of 2D and 3D animated maps for broadcast television, corporate presentations and online applications. The same year Vizrt listed on the Oslo Stock Exchange

Later in 2005, Vizrt acquired 19 percent of Adactus AS, a Norwegian company specializing in the transportation of content to mobile phone platforms. Together, Vizrt and Adactus developed Viz 3G, a graphics engine for mobile telephones and other mobile devices. Based on Vizrt's Viz Engine renderer and Adactus' MPEG-21 standards-based multimedia delivery platform, it was the first integration of a graphics engine for mobile phone video viewing applications. Vizrt acquired the rest of the shares in the company in 2010.

In 2006, Vizrt acquired Ardendo, a digital asset management company serving the television broadcast industry, based in Sweden.

In 2008, Vizrt acquired Escenic, a Norwegian developer of content management software for digital media publishing. Escenic technologies are used by many news media websites, including The Globe and Mail, the Times Online, The Daily Telegraph, and Welt Online.

In October 2010, Vizrt formalized its strategic collaboration with Stergen Hi-Tech Ltd. Stergen develops 2D to 3D video conversion technologies for the TV sports market.

In November 2010, Vizrt entered into a terms sheet with Swiss company LiberoVision AG, a developer of virtual sports enhancements. Vizrt fully acquired LiberoVision in 2012. Liberovision was then rebranded to Viz Libero. The CEP of LiberoVision, Stephan Würmlin Stadler, was appointed EVP Sports, managing Vizrt's sports production tools.

On November 13, 2013, Vizrt announced plans to sell its online production tools, formerly Escenic, to CCI of Denmark. As of January 7, 2014, Vizrt has completed sale of 75.5 percent of Escenic's outstanding share capital.

On the same day, November 13, 2013, Vizrt announced intentions to acquire Mosart Medialab from TV 2 Norway. The acquisition brought the Mosart control room automation system into the Vizrt product line. The system was renamed Viz Mosart and facilitated the creation of the Viz Opus control room in a box system.

On 10 November 2014, the company entered into a merger agreement with Nordic Capital. The merger was approved by an extraordinary general meeting of the company on 18 December 2014. On 19 March 2015, it was announced that all pre-closing conditions set out in the merger agreement had been fulfilled, and the merger was subsequently consummated on 19 March 2015. The acquisition removed Vizrt from the Oslo stock exchange.

In May 2019, Vizrt acquired all shares of the company NewTek for a sum of US$95.25 million, disclosed in their Q2 report.

== Noteworthy events ==
Vizrt's Viz Virtual Studio software and Viz Engine renderer were an integral part of the success of the first remote “holographic” live interviews conducted by CNN during the 2008 U.S. presidential election. Tracking data from the cameras in CNN's Election Center was processed by Viz Virtual Studio software. From the images captured, a specially developed Viz Engine plug-in, created a full 3D representation of the person. CNN also uses Vizrt for its award-winning MAM system, for broadcast graphics and for streaming to mobile.

Also in 2008, Vizrt technology powered a play-along version of “Who Wants to Be A Millionaire,” which aired on TV2 Norway. The show featured web-interactive elements. Viz Multi Platform Suite delivered real-time 3D graphics to the show's online participants. PGA Tour Productions selected Viz Ardome media asset management software to manage its HD and SD content in 2009. Also in 2009, ZDF (Zweites Deutsches Fernsehen), a German public-service broadcaster, began broadcasting using Vizrt's Virtual Studio and graphics systems.

In 2010, GMA Network, a Philippine commercial broadcast network, implemented Vizrt technology for the coverage of the Philippine national elections.

In 2011, Escenic and Sveriges Television (SVT) demonstrated the world's first professional website using on responsive design in the Escenic Content Engine.

In 2012, Vizrt provided graphic, video and online tools for three major events; the London Olympic Games, Euro2012 and the U.S. Presidential Election. For the U.S. Presidential Election, Vizrt graphics and video tools were used by almost all of the major U.S. broadcasters including ABC, CBS, Fox News, CNN, Univision. Global Broadcasters using Vizrt to cover the election included BBC, Sky News, CBC, Al Jazeera and many others.

In 2014, Vizrt provided virtual graphics and on-air graphics for Fox Sports coverage of the Super Bowl and Daytona 500. Vizrt also provided graphics systems for the Olympics in Sochi for customers such as TV 2 Norway, Viasat in Sweden and Sky Italia as well as provided Viz World customers access to satellite imagery that were continuously being collected during the games.

== See also ==
- Chyron Corporation
