= Heather Rae =

American actress and film producer

- Born: October 1966 (age 60)
- Citizenship: American
- Occupations: film producer; Director; actress
- Years active: 1990–present
- Known for: Frozen River; Trudell; Tallulah
- Spouse: Russell Friedenberg (m. 1999)
- Children: 3 including Johnny Sequoyah

Heather Rae (born Heather Rae Bybee in California, October 1966) is an American film and television producer and director. She has worked on documentary and narrative film projects, specializing in those with Native American themes, and is best known for Frozen River, Trudell, and Tallulah.

== Personal life ==
Rae was raised in Idaho.

In 1999, Rae married Russell Friedenberg, the American director and screenwriter. They have three children; her daughter is actress Johnny Sequoyah.

== Career ==
From 1996 to 2001, Rae directed the Native program at the Sundance Institute.

In 2000, she co-produced Backroads directed by Shirley Cheechoo, which premiered at Sundance Film Festival that year.

Rae was recognized as one of Variety's Ten Producers to Watch in 2008, and received the Piaget Producers Award and the Cinereach Producers Award.

Rae directed the 2005 film Trudell, which has been shown at over 100 film festivals worldwide. It received the Best Documentary Feature at the 30th Annual American Indian Film Festival and a Special Jury Prize for Best Documentary at the Seattle International Film Festival. In 2006, Trudell was nationally broadcast on PBS in the documentary series Independent Lens.

Circa 2006, Rae was an adjunct film studies professor at Boise State University, Idaho. Around this time, Rae co-founded True West and the True West Cinema Film Festival.

In 2008, she was recognized as one of Variety's Ten Producers to Watch. Frozen River (2008) received seven nominations and won two Independent Spirit Awards, including Rae winning the Piaget Producers Award. It won the Grand Jury Prize at the Sundance Film Festival, and received two Academy Award nominations for the Best Actress (Melissa Leo) and the Best Original Screenplay (Courtney Hunt). It was nominated for five Gotham Awards and won the Best Feature and the Breakthrough Actor awards in The 18th Annual Gotham Independent Film Awards.

In 2009, the Independent Spirit Awards gave Rae the Piaget Producers Award for Frozen River and Ibid.

In 2010, The Dry Land (2010) directed by Ryan Piers Williams and starring America Ferrera, Melissa Leo, Jason Ritter and Wilmer Valderrama, premiered at the Sundance Film Festival.

She established a production center in Boise where independent filmmakers such as Gregory Bayne, Randy Redroad and Blackhorse Lowe worked. It produced four feature films before being shuttered. Rae is a current and founding board member of the Sun Valley Film Festival.

After leaving Sundance, Rae worked for one year as senior vice president of production for Winter Films. From 2012 to 2015, Rae served as an artist trustee for the Sundance Institute's Board of Trustees.

I Believe in Unicorns (2014) directed by Film Fatales founder, Leah Meyerhoff and starring Natalia Dyer, Peter Vack and Julia Garner premiered at South by Southwest.

In 2016, Tallulah, starring Elliot Page and Allison Janney, written and directed by Sian Heder, premiered at the 2016 Sundance Film Festival and is a Netflix Original Film.

In 2019, Bull, written by Annie Silverstein and Johnny McAllister and directed by Annie Silverstein, premiered at the Cannes Film Festival.

From 2020 to 2021, Rae executively produced Amazon series Outer Range alongside Plan B Entertainment. Outer Range was created by Brian Watkins and starring Josh Brolin.

Rae has worked with filmmakers in several countries, including the Sami and British Film Institutes in Europe, New Zealand's Script to Screen and Power of Inclusion Summit, and in Egypt with Film Independent's Global Media Makers partnership with the Cairo International Film Festival.

== Personal heritage ==
Rae self-identifies as Native American, and has said that her mother is Cherokee; however neither she nor her mother is an enrolled member of any federally or state-recognized Native American tribe or community. In March 2023 her status was questioned by the Tribal Alliance Against Frauds. According to the group, Rae's family records do not show any Native American heritage, and her family on both sides has identified as white across multiple public records, going back at least six generations. Rae responded in an interview with Rebecca Sun at the Hollywood Reporter, stating that her family has identified over many generations as having Native American ancestry and that she identifies as an "ally" to the Native American community, and allegedly no longer claims Cherokee heritage, with "public mentions" eliding "any mention of personal Native affiliation for her altogether".

== Filmography ==
=== Feature films ===
Producer

- Sawtooth (2004)
- Trudell (2005) (director)
- Out of the Blue: A Film About Life and Football (2007)
- Water Flowing Together (2007)
- Frozen River (2008)
- Ibid (2008)
- The Dry Land (2010)
- First Circle (2010) (director)
- Magic Valley (2010)
- Ass Backwards (2013)
- I Believe in Unicorns (2014)
- Among Ravens (2014)
- Black Eyed Dog (2014)
- Wind Walkers (2015)
- Tallulah (2016)
- Dude (2018)
- Bull (2019)
- Fancy Dance (2023)

Executive producer

- Apache 8 (2011)
- Mosquita y Mari (2012)
- Young Lakota (2012)
- Winter in the Blood (2013)
- Five Thirteen (2013)
- 1982 (2013)
- Dawnland (2018)
- Once Upon a River (2019)
- For the Love of Rutland (2020)
- I'll Meet You There (2020)

Associate producer

- Silent Tears (1997) (actress)

Co-Producer

- Backroads (2000)
- Asylum Seekers (2009)

=== Television ===
| Year(s) | Title | Role | Notes |
|---|---|---|---|
| 1994 | The Native Americans | Field producer | |
| 2009 | 500 Nations | Field producer | 3 episodes |
| 1996 | Storytellers of the Pacific | Field producer | |
| 2008 | 30 Days | Consulting producer | 1 episode |
| 2006-2013 | Independent Lens | Executive producer (2013) – Producer (2006, 2008) | 3 episodes |
| 2017 | Rise | Executive producer | 1 episode |
| 2022 | Outer Range | Executive producer | |

=== Short films ===
| Year(s) | Title | Role |
|---|---|---|
| 1990 | Birth Our Own | Producer / Director |
| 1997 | Silent Tears | Associate producer |
| 2004 | The Wicked Men | Consulting producer |
| 2009 | Shimásáni | Producer |
| 2019 | Sweetheart Dancers | Consulting producer |
| 2019 | Paulette | Director |

== Honors ==
- In 2005 she was nominated for the Grand Jury Prize at the Sundance Film Festival for her film Trudell. Also in 2005 she won the Documentary Special Jury Award for Trudell at the Seattle International Film Festival.
- In 2008 she won the Grand Jury Prize at the Sundance Film Festival with Frozen River. She also won Best Film at the Gotham Awards for Frozen River.
- In 2009 she was nominated for the Independent Spirit Award for Best feature for Frozen River at the Independent Spirit Awards. Also at the Independent Spirit Awards she won the Piaget Producers Award also for Frozen River and Ibid.
- At the 2009 USA AFI Awards she won the AFI award for Movie of the Year again with Frozen River.
- In 2013 Rae was awarded the Vision Award at the Sun Valley Film Festival for her excellence in filmmaking.
- In 2016 Rae was recognized by Cinereach with the Producers Award. She was the inaugural recipient.
