= Team Queen =

- Directed by: Leah Meyerhoff
- Written by: Leah Meyerhoff
- Produced by: Monica Hoenig
- Starring: Murray Hill; Julie Atlas Muz; Tigger; Molly the Dolly; Scarlet Sinclair; Scotty the Blue Bunny
- Cinematography: Cary Fukunaga
- Edited by: Leah Meyerhoff
- Music by: Triple Creme
- Release date: May 15, 2006
- Running time: 4 minutes
- Country: United States
- Language: English

Team Queen is a music video for Triple Creme directed by Leah Meyerhoff.

A Planet Out Award finalist, Team Queen is a gender-bending, fire-breathing, tassel-twirling music video for the queer post-punk band Triple Creme starring the best of New York burlesque. Team Queen has screened at dozens of film festivals worldwide and is currently airing on LOGO.

== Synopsis ==
The new girl in school is thrown into a topsy-turvy madhouse of high school hellcats. The cheerleaders are drag queens, the nerds are nymphomaniacs, the punks breathe fire, and the prom band is none other than queer post-punk phenomenon Triple Creme. Featuring the best of New York burlesque: including Murray Hill, Julie Atlas Muz, Tigger, and Scotty the Blue Bunny.

== Cast ==
Murray Hill — Principal
Molly the Dolly — Prom Queen
Julie Atlas Muz — Burlesque Dancer
Tigger — Burlesque Dancer
Scarlet Sinclair — Burlesque Dancer
Scotty the Blue Bunny — Burlesque Dancer

== Awards ==
- Planet Out Awards — Finalist
- Fort Worth LGBT Film Festival — Best Music Video
- Out Music Awards — Best Music Video Nominee
- San Diego Women Film Festival — Judge's Award
- Pill Awards — Best Music Video Nominee
- Gaffers Film Festival — Best Music Video
- Rebel Film Festival — Best Music Video
- Micro Cine Fest — Best Music Video
- Evil City Film Fest — Best Music Video

== Festivals ==
- Antimatter Underground Film Festival
- Austin LGBT Film Festival
- Austin Underground Film Festival
- Backseat Film Festival
- Boston Underground Film Festival
- Boxurshorts Film Festival
- Brighton Film Festival
- Brooklyn Cinema Series
- Charm City Kitty Club
- Cinejam
- Coney Island Film Festival
- Copenhagen Gay & Lesbian Film Festival
- Cucalorus Film Festival
- Ellensburg Film Festival
- End of the Pier Film Festival
- Evil City Film Festival
- First Run Film Festival
- Flix & Mix Film Festival
- Fort Worth Gay & Lesbian Film Festival
- Frameline Film Festival
- Fresh Fruit Film Festival
- Fylmz Festival
- Gaffers Film Festival
- Great Lakes Film Festival
- Homoagogo
- Indie Music Video Festival
- Inside Out Film and Video Festival
- Lake County Film Festival
- Lost Film Fest
- Miami Gay & Lesbian Film Festival
- Micro Cine Fest
- Milan Gay & Lesbian Film Festival
- MondoHomo
- MIX Film Festival
- New England Women in Film and Video
- NewFest
- No Festival Required
- NXNE
- Ohio Independent Film Festival
- Outfest
- Out Takes Dallas
- Oxford Film Festival
- Planet Ant Film Festival
- Portland Gay & Lesbian Film Festival
- Portland Underground Film Festival
- Pride Film Festival
- Q Cinema
- Queens International Film Festival
- Queeruption
- Queer Quickie Film Festival
- Rebel Film Festival
- Reeling Film Festival
- Rome International Film Festival
- Route 66 Film Festival
- San Antonio Underground Film Festival
- San Diego Women Film Festival
- San Francisco Women's Film Festival
- Santa Cruz Film Festival
- Sarasota Film Festival
- Silver Lake Shorts
- Teabag Film Workshop
- Tiburon International Film Festival
- Toofy Film Festival
- Trenton Film Festival
- Waterfront Film Festival
- Wichita Film Festival

== Reviews ==
Paper magazine writes "They’re here, they’re queer, and they’re ready to rock. The grrrls in the post-punk Brooklyn band Triple-Crème are not afraid of a little heavy bass or some catchy guitar riffs. They’re also not afraid to kick your ass." Christa Martin of GT Weekly says "This colorful romp in high school antics and edginess is a wild ride of a music video."

Elaine Mak of New England Film said that "award-winning director Leah Meyerhoff has built up a large list of accomplishments as a filmmaker" and Flavorpill writes: "post-punk lez rockers Triple Creme enlisted the brightest and most buoyant of New York's burlesque scene to star in the new music video for their single Team Queen."
