= John Trudell =

Native American activist, author, and poet (1946–2015)

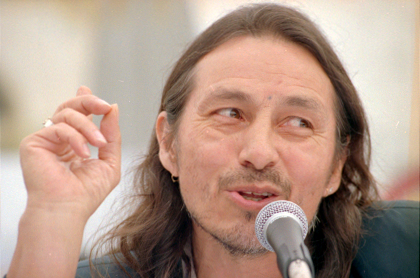
- Trudell in 1997
- Born: February 15, 1946; Omaha, Nebraska, U.S.
- Died: December 8, 2015 (aged 69); Santa Clara County, California, U.S.
- Citizenship: Santee Sioux Nation, USA
- Occupations: Indigenous rights activist, poet, musician, actor
- Organization: American Indian Movement
- Spouses: Fenicia Ordonez (m. 1968; div. 1970) Tina Manning (m. 1972; died 1979)
- Partner: Marcheline Bertrand (?–2007)
- Children: 5
- Military career
- Allegiance: United States
- Branch: United States Navy
- Service years: 1963–1967

John Trudell (February 15, 1946 – December 8, 2015) was an American author, poet, actor, musician, and political activist. He was the spokesperson for the Indians of All Tribes' takeover of Alcatraz beginning in 1969, broadcasting as Radio Free Alcatraz. During most of the 1970s, he served as the chairman of the American Indian Movement, based in Minneapolis, Minnesota.

After his pregnant wife, three children, and mother-in-law were killed in 1979 in a suspicious fire at the home of his parents-in-law on the Shoshone-Paiute Tribes Duck Valley Indian Reservation in Nevada, Trudell turned to writing, music and film as a second career. He acted in films in the 1990s. The documentary Trudell (2005) was made about him and his life as an activist and artist.

== Early life and education ==
Trudell was born in Omaha, Nebraska, on February 15, 1946, the son of a Santee Dakota father and a Mexican-American mother. He grew up in small towns near the Santee Sioux Reservation in northern Nebraska near the southeast corner of South Dakota. He was educated in local schools and also in Santee Dakota culture.

== Military service ==
At the age of 17 in 1963, Trudell dropped out of high school and left the Midwest to join the U.S. Navy. He served during the early years of the Vietnam War and stayed in the Navy until 1967.

Afterwards, he attended San Bernardino Valley College, a two-year community college in San Bernardino, California, studying radio and broadcasting.

== Activism ==
After leaving the military, Trudell had become involved in Indian activism. In 1969, he became the spokesperson for the United Indians of All Tribes' occupation of Alcatraz Island. This was a mostly student-member group that had developed in San Francisco. Trudell went to Alcatraz a week after the occupation started. He used his background in broadcasting and ran a radio station from the island through a cooperative arrangement with students at the University of California, Berkeley, broadcasting at night over the Berkeley FM station KPFA. The show was called Radio Free Alcatraz. He discussed the cause of the occupation and American Indian issues and played traditional Native American music. He criticized how "the system today is only geared toward white needs." He spoke for the many Indigenous people who believed they did not fit in with the majority of European-American population of the nation. He became a spokesperson for the occupation specifically and for the Alcatraz-Red Power Movement generally, as the author Vine Deloria, Jr. named it. Trudell was the spokesman for the nearly two-year-long occupation, until 1971.

After the failure of the federal government to meet demands of the protesters at Alcatraz, Trudell joined the American Indian Movement. It had been established in 1968 in Minneapolis among urban American Indians, first to deal with alleged police harassment and injustice in the law enforcement system. Trudell acted as its national chairman from 1973 until 1979. He took the position after the first chairman, Carter Camp, was convicted for actions related to a protest and was sentenced to jail.

=== Loss of family in house fire ===
On February 12, 1979, Trudell's wife Tina Manning, their three children and his mother-in-law, Leah Hicks-Manning, died in a suspicious fire at the home of his parents-in-law on the Duck Valley Indian Reservation in Nevada. His father-in-law Arthur Manning survived. He was a member of the Duck Valley Shoshone Paiute's Tribal Council which was working for treaty rights. Opponents included the local tribal police chief and the BIA superintendent, John Artichoker. Leah coordinated social services at the reservation. Tina had been working for tribal water rights at the Wild Horse Reservoir. Opponents of her campaign included officials of the local BIA, Elko County and Nevada state officials, members of the water recreation industry, and local white ranchers. Other activists have also speculated whether there was government involvement behind the tragedy. The house fire that killed Trudell's family happened within 24 hours of him burning a US flag on the steps of the FBI building in Washington, D.C. in protest of the government's treatment of Native Americans and the Sioux Nation. Trudell believed that the fire was meant to threaten and silence him and his activist wife.

Trudell believed that the fire was arson, but the BIA police investigation claimed that it was accidental. In numerous interviews, he expressed distrust for the federal government and specifically the FBI.

=== Aquash murder controversy ===
In 2004, Trudell testified in the federal trial of Arlo Looking Cloud, an Oglala Lakota American Indian Movement (AIM) member charged in the kidnapping and murder of Anna Mae Aquash, the highest-ranking woman in AIM, in December 1975. Trudell testified that Looking Cloud had told him that John Graham, another low-level AIM member, was the gunman in the murder. Trudell identified Graham from photographs. Looking Cloud was convicted in 2004 and sentenced to life imprisonment.

His testimony was part of the evidence considered by the Canadian judge who ordered Graham's extradition to the United States in February 2005. On March 2, 2005, the Native Youth Movement Vancouver announced a boycott of Trudell's music and poetry in retaliation for his testimony and alleged that the FBI had killed Aquash. In 2010, Graham was convicted in a South Dakota state court of felony murder of Aquash and sentenced to life imprisonment.

=== Later years ===
Trudell was the co-founder, with Willie Nelson, of Hempstead Project Heart, which became a project of Earth Island Institute in 2012. Hempstead Project Heart is dedicated to raising awareness about the environmental, social, and economic benefits of legalizing industrial hemp in America.

Trudell was also involved with Seva Foundation and their Native American programs. He performed at numerous benefit concerts in support of their work.

== Personal life ==
In 1968, Trudell married his first wife, Fenicia "Lou" Ordonez, divorcing in 1970. They had one son, Wovoka Trudell, who was born on Alcatraz Island; and a daughter, Tara Evonne Trudell.

In 1972, Trudell married Tina Manning, an activist of the Duck Valley Shoshone Paiute Tribe. They had three children together: Ricarda Star, Sunshine Karma, and Eli Changing Sun. In February 1979, Tina (who was pregnant), the children and her mother Leah Hicks-Manning were all killed in a fire at her parents' house on the Duck Valley Reservation. Her father Arthur survived. This occurred within a day of John Trudell burning the American Flag on the steps of the Capitol building in Washington D.C.

Trudell was in a relationship with Marcheline Bertrand, the mother of actress Angelina Jolie, at the time of her death from cancer in 2007.

In early December 2015, it was announced that Trudell was in the last stages of terminal cancer. His death was prematurely announced on the evening of December 4, 2015; his publicist asked for a retraction and the stories were largely removed from the websites where they had been posted. Trudell died on December 8, 2015. According to Independent Lens, one of his last statements was: "I want people to remember me as they remember me." After his death, a family member posted: "My ride showed up. Celebrate Love. Celebrate Life," on his Facebook page.

== Musical career ==
In 1979, Trudell met musical artist and activist Jackson Browne and became more interested in the musical world (and recording albums and performing his own compositions in live venues).

Trudell recorded an album AKA Grafitti Man ("graffiti" was misspelled in the title) with Kiowa guitarist Jesse Ed Davis that was originally available on cassette tape format only. This comports with the practice common to American Indigenous and other minorities of distributing music mixtapes. These tapes were captured live at group events and copied and distributed through non-commercial channels, like those of the San Francisco-based rock group Grateful Dead, Native American powwow music performances in general, and African American gatherings - whence came the expression Each One Teach One.

In 1990, he took part in Tony Hymas's Oyaté project.

In 1992, Trudell remade and re-released AKA Grafitti Man as an audio CD to substantial critical and popular acclaim.

Arguably his greatest musical success came with the 1994 album Johnny Damas & Me that was described as "a culmination of years of poetic work, and an example of a process of fusing traditional sounds, values, and sensibilities with thought-provoking lyrics, this time with urgent rock and roll."

His musical releases (many with his band Bad Dog) include A.K.A Grafitti Man (1986), Heart Jump Bouquet (1987), Blue Indians (1999), Descendant Now Ancestor (2001), Bone Days (2001), Live A Fip (2003), Madness and The Moremes (2007), Crazier Than Hell (2010), Wazi's Dream (2015).

Popular Music critic Neal Ullestad said of Trudell's live performances, "This isn't simply pop rock with Indian drums and chants added. It's integrated rock and roll by an American Indian with a multicultural band directed to anyone who will listen."

The closing sequence of Alanis Obomsawin's 2014 documentary film Trick or Treaty? is set to Trudell's song "Crazy Horse."

== Writing career ==
About six months after the deaths of his family, Trudell started writing poetry. He described his work, "They're called poems, but in reality they're lines given to me to hang on to." He has written many poems, including "Baby Boom Che" and "Rant and Roll," and hundreds of others.

In the 2010s he often shared recent poetic musings and written works-in-progress via social media, such as his Facebook page.

Various impromptu videos of Trudell in live concert appearances or addressing political, social, indigenous rights and educational groups are posted on YouTube, and although he was sought after by various print and broadcast media outlets for "sound byte commentary," Trudell preferred to speak in a less frenetic style directly to gatherings assembled for specific causes that he supported (e.g., advocating on behalf of re-legalizing hemp cultivation for its many beneficial uses, including sustainable paper pulp).

Trudell often used his poetry as lyrics for recordings and began in 1982 to set them to traditional American Indian music, which also in the 1980s eventually led to the recording of A.K.A Graffiti Man, as he struggled to make sense of bewildering situations that confronted him, including the loss of so many loved ones.

In late 1988, Australian rock band Midnight Oil invited Trudell (as Graffiti Man) to tour with them during their From Diesel and Dust to the Big Mountain world tour. They billed Trudell's part of the show as "Native American activist performance." Members of Midnight Oil played traditional instruments, sang in native American languages, and accompanied songs with heavy psychedelic Hendrix-style guitar, accompanying Trudell. This exposure brought Trudell new and larger audiences.

Trudell also toured in 1993 with Peter Gabriel's global WOMAD (World Music and Dance) production. He was billed as John Trudell, performing his traditional songs and reading his poetry.

In 2008, Trudell published a book, Lines From a Mined Mind: The Words of John Trudell, a collection of 25 years of poetry, lyrics and essays.

== Acting ==
Trudell created a career as an actor, performing in roles in Pow Wow Highway (1989), Thunderheart (1992), On Deadly Ground (1994) and Smoke Signals (1998) (as the DJ Randy Peone on K-REZ radio). He was an adviser to the production of Incident at Oglala, directed by Michael Apted and produced by Robert Redford. A kind of companion piece to the fictional Thunderheart, the 1992 documentary explores facts related to the 1975 shooting of two FBI agents at the Pine Ridge Indian Reservation, for which Leonard Peltier was convicted in 1977. In Thunderheart, Trudell played a character who resembles Peltier.

| Year | Title | Role | Notes |
|---|---|---|---|
| 1989 | Pow Wow Highway | Louie Short Hair | |
| 1992 | Thunderheart | Jimmy Looks Twice | |
| 1994 | On Deadly Ground | Johnny Redfeather | |
| 1996 | Extreme Measures | Tony | |
| 1998 | Smoke Signals | Randy Peone | |
| 2003 | Dreamkeeper | Coyote | |
| 2004 | Sawtooth | Worm | |
| 2012 | Dark Blood | Indian #2 | |
| 2017 | Rumble: The Indians Who Rocked the World | Himself | |

== Documentary ==
The filmmaker Heather Rae spent more than a decade making a documentary about Trudell, which was released in 2005. Her intent in Trudell (2005) was to demonstrate how his political and cultural activities were tied to contemporary history and inspired people. The film premiered at the 2005 Sundance Film Festival in the U.S. documentary competition. The movie has received a mixed response among film critics and viewers. Some claimed it to be thought-provoking and touching, while others suggested Rae made a one-dimensional biopic. The song used at the end of the film is "Johnny Lobo" about Trudell by Kris Kristofferson, from his 1995 album A Moment of Forever.

== Discography ==
John Trudell has appeared on the following albums:

- 1983 Tribal Voice
- 1986 aka Graffiti Man (with Jesse Ed Davis)
- 1987 ...But This Isn't El Salvador (as Tribal Voice)
- 1987 Heart Jump Bouquet (with Jesse Ed Davis)
- 1991 Fables and Other Realities
- 1992 Child's Voice: Children of the Earth (vocals performed by Trudell's daughters)
- 1992 AKA Grafitti Man
- 1994 Johnny Damas & Me
- 1999 Blue Indians
- 2001 Descendant Now Ancestor (spoken word)
- 2001 Bone Days (produced by the actress Angelina Jolie)
- 2003 The Collection: 1985-1992 (anthology of first six albums)
- 2005 Live à Fip
- 2007 Madness & The Moremes (double album)
- 2010 Crazier Than Hell
- 2010 Out Live This Beast (with Cempoalli 20)
- 2010 Rare Breed: The Songs of Peter La Farge (Bad Girl)
- 2014 Through the Dust (with Kwest)
- 2014 Generations of Evolution (with Meds Hawk)
- 2015 Wazi's Dream (feat. Bad Dog: Quiltman, Mark Shark, Billy Watts, Ricky Eckstein)
- 2015 Ancestors Song and The Fire Is Hungry (with Thana Redhawk)
- 2016 Time Dreams (with The Pines)
- 2016 Like Broken Butterflies (with Kwest)
- 2016 We Are the Halluci Nation (with A Tribe Called Red)
- 2020 Streams of Thought, Vol. 3: Cane & Able(Black Thought)
- 2021 MADA (with Sin Soto)

His music draws from a blend of styles, including rock, blues and native beats, pop and political protest songs. He also draws from his own poetry. His music can be both insightful and funny.

== Bibliography ==
- Trudell, John. Living in Reality: Songs Called Poems, Society of the People Struggling to be Free, 1982, 71 pages, ISBN B001B0TKZO
- Trudell, John. Stickman: Poems, Lyrics, Talks, edited by Paola Igliori. New York, New York: Inanout Press, 1999, 168 pages, ISBN 978-0962511981
- Trudell, John. Lines From a Mined Mind: The Words of John Trudell, Fulcrum Pub, 2008, 280 pages, ISBN 978-1555916787

=== Anthology publications ===
- Trudell, John. "Carry the Stone" Seeds of Fire: Contemporary Poetry from the Other U. S. A.. edited by Jonathan Andersen. Smokestack Books, 2008. ISBN 978-0955402821
