= Corey Hawkins =

American actor (born 1988)

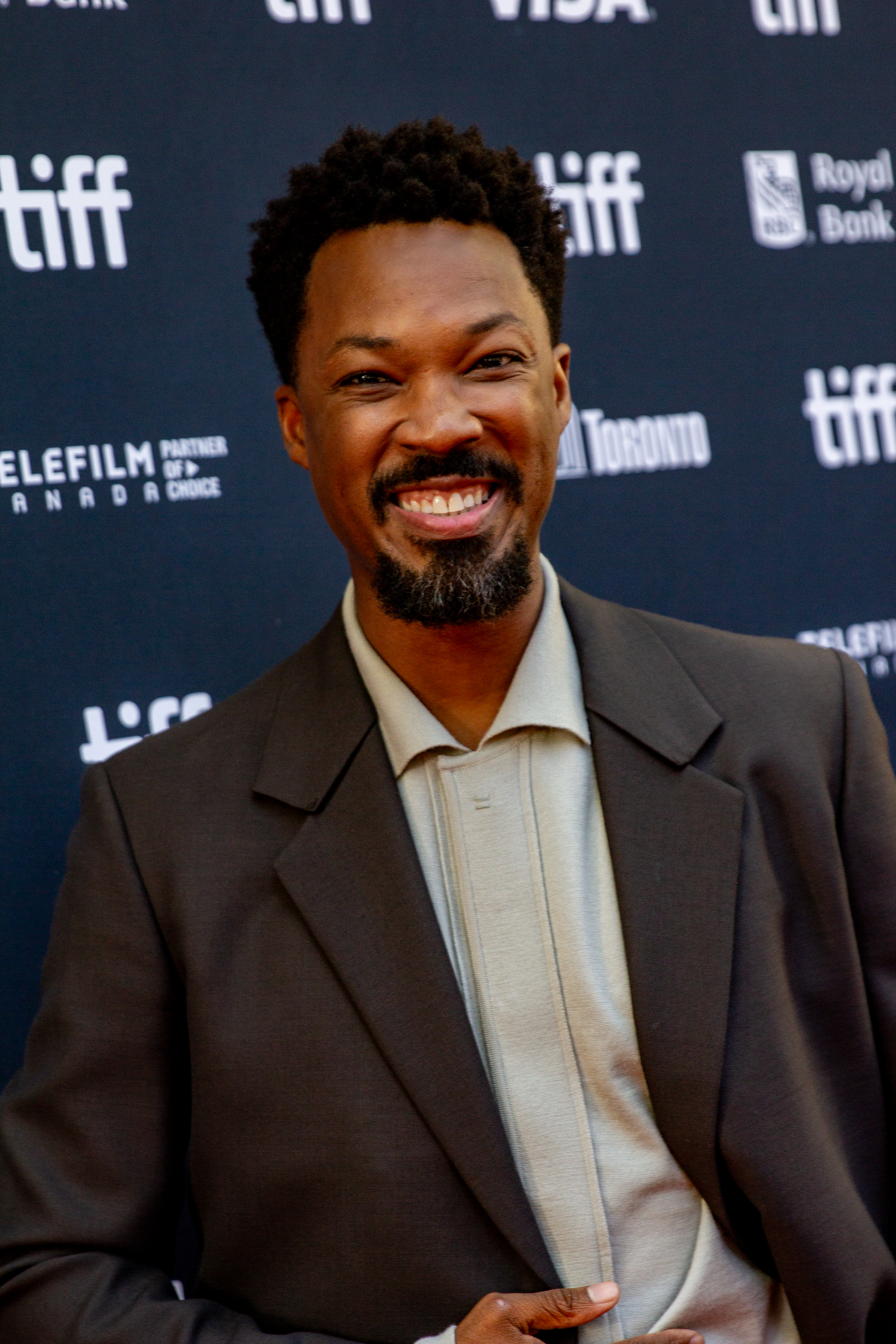
- Hawkins at the 2024 Toronto International Film Festival
- Born: Corey Antonio Hawkins; October 22, 1988 (age 37); Washington, D.C., U.S.
- Education: Juilliard School (BFA)
- Occupation: Actor
- Years active: 2011–present

Corey Antonio Hawkins (born October 22, 1988) is an American actor. He rose to prominence for his role in the TV series The Walking Dead (2015–2016), as well as his portrayal of Dr. Dre in the 2015 film Straight Outta Compton, the latter of which earned him a Screen Actors Guild Award nomination. He is also known for his performances on Broadway starring in Six Degrees of Separation (2017) and Topdog/Underdog (2022), both of which earned him nominations for the Tony Award for Best Actor in a Play.

That same year, Hawkins starred in the Fox network series 24: Legacy (2017), along with Jordan Vogt-Roberts' monster film Kong: Skull Island. In 2018, he was featured in Spike Lee's biographical crime-comedy BlacKkKlansman, which earned him a nomination for a Screen Actors Guild Award. Hawkins received a nomination for a Primetime Emmy Award for his portrayal of Paul in the Quibi series Survive (2020).

His other roles include Michael Bay's action-comedy 6 Underground (2019), Jon M. Chu's musical film In the Heights (2021), and Joel Coen's historical thriller film The Tragedy of Macbeth (2021). He starred in the 2023 film adaptation of The Color Purple and Christopher Nolan's 2026 adaptation of The Odyssey.

== Early life and education ==
Hawkins was born in Washington, D.C., where he was raised by his mother, a police officer. He attended the Duke Ellington School of the Arts, and graduated from the Juilliard School in New York City, a member of the drama division's "Group 40". While studying at Juilliard, Hawkins received the prestigious John Houseman Award for excellence in classical theatre.

== Career ==
Upon graduation, he began a career starring Off-Broadway and guest-starring on television. Hawkins garnered a brief role in Marvel Studios' Iron Man 3 and went on to star opposite Liam Neeson and Julianne Moore in Universal Pictures' action-thriller Non-Stop.

In 2013, Hawkins made his Broadway debut as Tybalt in the revival of William Shakespeare's Romeo and Juliet, acting alongside Orlando Bloom and Geoffrey Owens. In 2015, The Hollywood Reporter announced that Hawkins would join the cast of AMC's The Walking Dead as Heath, a key character from Robert Kirkman's comic series. Hawkins played Dr. Dre in the biopic Straight Outta Compton, from Universal Pictures, which was theatrically released on August 14, 2015, and grossed $201 million at the box office.

In 2017, Hawkins began playing a lead role in the 24 reboot 24: Legacy on Fox. Also that year, he co-starred in the film Kong: Skull Island, alongside Brie Larson, Samuel L. Jackson and Tom Hiddleston. In spring 2017, Hawkins played a limited-engagement run on Broadway in the play Six Degrees of Separation opposite Allison Janney and John Benjamin Hickey. He received a nomination for the Tony Award for Best Actor in a Play.

Hawkins performed "God Bless America" for the men's singles final at the 2017 U.S. Open. In January 2024, it was announced that Hawkins would replace Jonathan Majors for The Man in My Basement.

In 2026, Hawkins appeared as Polybus in Christopher Nolan's summer blockbuster The Odyssey. He plays one of the suitors alongside Robert Pattinson vying for the hand of Penelope (played by Anne Hathaway)

== Acting credits ==
=== Film ===
Key
†	Denotes works that have not yet been released

Year	Title	Role	Notes
2011	Digital Antiquities	Kai	Short film
2012	Allegiance	Willie	
2013	Iron Man 3	Navy Op	
2014	Non-Stop	Travis Mitchell	
2014	Romeo and Juliet	Tybalt	Filmed live performance
2015	Straight Outta Compton	Andre "Dr. Dre" Young	
2017	Kong: Skull Island	Houston Brooks	
2018	BlacKkKlansman	Stokely Carmichael	
2019	Georgetown	Daniel Volker	
2019	6 Underground	Blaine / Seven	
2021	In the Heights	Benny	
2021	The Tragedy of Macbeth	Macduff	
2023	The Last Voyage of the Demeter	Clemens	
2023	The Color Purple	Harpo Johnson	
2024	The Piano Lesson	Avery Brown	
2025	The Man in My Basement	Charles Blakey	
2026	Crime 101	Detective Tillman	
2026	The Odyssey	Polybus	
TBA	Nightwatching †	TBA	Filming

=== Television ===
Year	Title	Role	Notes
2011	Royal Pains	Busboy	Episode: "The Shaw/Hank Redemption"
2013	Golden Boy	Evander	Episode: "Young Guns"
2015–2016	The Walking Dead	Heath	Recurring role (season 6); Guest role (season 7); 6 episodes
2017	24: Legacy	Eric Carter	Main role; 13 episodes
2020	Survive	Paul	Main role; 12 episodes
2025	Poker Face	Bill	Episode: "One Last Job"

=== Theater ===
Year	Title	Role	Stage
2011	Hurt Village	Buggy	Signature Theatre Company
2011	Suicide Inc	Perry	Roundabout Theatre Company
2013	Romeo and Juliet	Tybalt	Richard Rodgers Theatre
2017	Six Degrees of Separation	Paul	Ethel Barrymore Theatre
2022–2023	Topdog/Underdog	Lincoln	John Golden Theatre

== Awards and nominations ==
Association	Year	Category	Project	Result	Ref.
African-American Film Critics Association Awards	2015	Best Ensemble	Straight Outta Compton	Won	
African-American Film Critics Association Awards	2024	Best Ensemble	The Color Purple	Won	
Astra Film and Creative Awards	2024	Best Cast Ensemble	The Color Purple	Won	
Black Reel Award	2016	Best Supporting Actor	Straight Outta Compton	Nominated	
Celebration of Cinema and Television	2023	Ensemble Award – Film	The Color Purple	Won	
Critics' Choice Movie Award	2016	Best Acting Ensemble	Straight Outta Compton	Nominated	
Critics' Choice Movie Award	2024	Best Acting Ensemble	The Color Purple	Nominated	
Florida Film Critics Circle	2016	Best Ensemble	Straight Outta Compton	Nominated	
Georgia Film Critics Association Awards	2024	Best Ensemble	The Color Purple	Nominated	
Hollywood Film Awards	2015	Breakout Ensemble Award	Straight Outta Compton	Won	
NAACP Image Award	2015	Outstanding Supporting Actor in a Motion Picture	Straight Outta Compton	Nominated	
NAACP Image Award	2024	Outstanding Supporting Actor in a Motion Picture	The Color Purple	Nominated	
NAACP Image Award	2024	Outstanding Ensemble Cast in a Motion Picture	The Color Purple	Won	
NAACP Image Award	2025	Outstanding Ensemble Cast in a Motion Picture	The Piano Lesson	Nominated	
NAACP Image Award	2025	Outstanding Ensemble Cast in a Motion Picture	The Piano Lesson	Nominated	
Primetime Emmy Award	2020	Outstanding Actor in a Short Form Series	Survive	Nominated	
San Diego Film Critics Society	2016	Best Ensemble	Straight Outta Compton	Nominated	
Screen Actors Guild Award	2015	Outstanding Cast in a Motion Picture	Straight Outta Compton	Nominated	
Screen Actors Guild Award	2018	Outstanding Cast in a Motion Picture	BlacKkKlansman	Nominated	
Screen Actors Guild Award	2023	Outstanding Cast in a Motion Picture	The Color Purple	Nominated	
Tony Award	2017	Best Actor in a Play	Six Degrees of Separation	Nominated	
Tony Award	2023	Best Actor in a Play	Topdog/Underdog	Nominated	
Washington D.C. Area Film Critics Association	2015	Best Ensemble	Straight Outta Compton	Nominated	

== See also ==
- African-American Tony nominees and winners
