= Jarin Blaschke =

American cinematographer (born 1978)

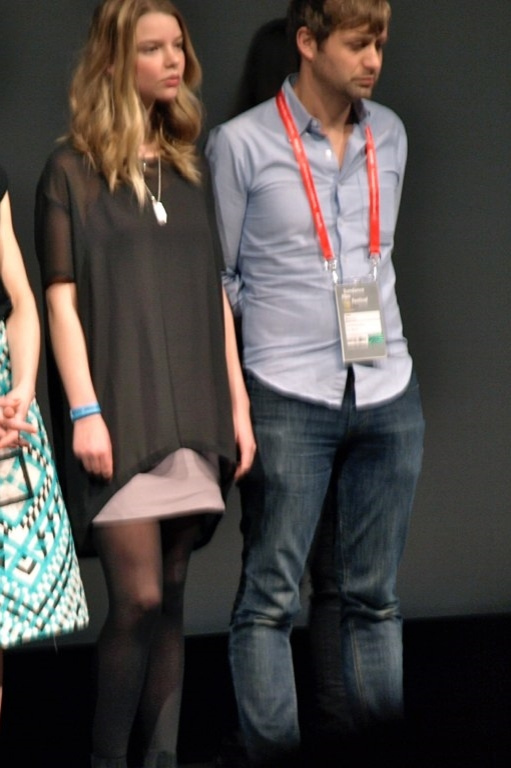
- Blaschke with Anya Taylor-Joy at 2015 Sundance Film Festival for a screening of The Witch
- Born: September 28, 1978 (age 47); Westminster, California, U.S.
- Occupation: Cinematographer
- Website: www.jarinblaschke.com

Jarin Blaschke ASC (born September 28, 1978) is an American cinematographer, best known for his work with director Robert Eggers. For his work on Eggers' horror films The Lighthouse (2019) and Nosferatu (2024), he earned nominations for the Academy Award for Best Cinematography.

== Early life and education ==
When he was 16, Blaschke moved to New York City to study film at the School of Visual Arts.

== Career ==
Blaschke first rose to prominence with his work on Robert Eggers' directorial debut The Witch. His work received acclaim, in addition to several film critic association nominations, including the Seattle Film Critics Society Award for Best Cinematography. He would reteam with Eggers for The Lighthouse, which was filmed in black and white. In addition to his Academy Award nomination, Blaschke won the Independent Spirit Award for Best Cinematography, and was nominated for the BAFTA and Critics' Choice Award.

== Personal life ==
Blaschke currently lives in England.

== Filmography ==
=== Film ===
Year	Title	Director	Notes
2009	Blood Night: The Legend of Mary Hatchet	Frank Sabatella	With Christopher Walters
2012	Fray	Geoff Ryan	
2014	I Believe in Unicorns	Leah Meyerhoff	
2015	The Witch	Robert Eggers	
2017	Shimmer Lake	Oren Uziel	
2018	Back Roads	Alex Pettyfer	
2018	Down a Dark Hall	Rodrigo Cortés	
2019	The Lighthouse	Robert Eggers	
2022	The Northman	Robert Eggers	
2023	Knock at the Cabin	M. Night Shyamalan	With Lowell A. Meyer
2024	Nosferatu	Robert Eggers	
2026	Werwulf †	Robert Eggers	Post-production

=== Television ===
Year	Title	Director	Notes
2020	Servant	Lisa Brühlmann	Episode "Boba"
2020	The Pale Horse	Leonora Lonsdale	Miniseries

== Awards and nominations ==
Year	Title	Award	Category	Result	Ref.
2019	The Lighthouse	Independent Spirit Award	Best Cinematography	Won	
2019	The Lighthouse	Academy Awards	Best Cinematography	Nominated	
2019	The Lighthouse	BAFTA Awards	Best Cinematography	Nominated	
2019	The Lighthouse	Seattle Film Critics Society	Best Cinematography	Nominated	
2024	Nosferatu	National Board of Review	Outstanding Achievement in Cinematography	Won	
2024	Nosferatu	Astra Film and Creative Arts Awards	Best Cinematography	Nominated	
2024	Nosferatu	Washington D.C. Area Film Critics Association	Best Cinematography	Won	
2024	Nosferatu	San Diego Film Critics Society	Best Cinematography	Won	
2024	Nosferatu	Chicago Film Critics Association	Best Cinematography	Nominated	
2024	Nosferatu	Las Vegas Film Critics Society	Best Cinematography	Nominated	
2024	Nosferatu	St. Louis Film Critics Association	Best Cinematography	Won	
2024	Nosferatu	San Francisco Bay Area Film Critics Circle	Best Cinematography	Nominated	
2024	Nosferatu	New York Film Critics Online	Best Cinematography	Nominated	
2024	Nosferatu	Southeastern Film Critics Association Awards	Best Cinematography	Nominated	
2024	Nosferatu	Phoenix Film Critics Society Awards	Best Cinematography	Won	
2024	Nosferatu	Seattle Film Critics Society	Best Cinematography	Nominated	
2024	Nosferatu	Indiana Film Journalists Association	Best Cinematography	Won	
2024	Nosferatu	North Texas Film Critics Association Awards	Best Cinematography	Won	
2024	Nosferatu	Austin Film Critics Association	Best Cinematography	Nominated	
2024	Nosferatu	Critics' Choice Awards	Best Cinematography	Won	
2024	Nosferatu	Satellite Awards	Best Cinematography	Nominated	
2024	Nosferatu	London Critics Circle Film Awards	Technical Achievement of the Year	Nominated	
2024	Nosferatu	Alliance of Women Film Journalists	Best Cinematography	Nominated	
2024	Nosferatu	American Society of Cinematographers	Best Cinematography	Nominated	
2024	Nosferatu	Academy Awards	Best Cinematography	Nominated	
