= Survive (TV series) =

American streaming television series

- Genre: Adventure; Thriller drama
- Based on: Survive by Alex Morel
- Written by: Richard Abate; Jeremy Ungar
- Directed by: Mark Pellington
- Starring: Sophie Turner; Corey Hawkins
- Composer: Peter G. Adams
- No. of seasons: 1
- No. of episodes: 12

Production
- Executive producers: Michael Sammaciccia; Barry Barclay; Julia Zaytseva; Igor Pronin; Van Toffler; Floris Bauer
- Producers: Cary Granat; Ed Jones
- Cinematography: David Devlin
- Running time: 5–10 minutes
- Production companies: EMH; Gunpowder & Sky

Original release
- Network: Quibi
- Release: April 6 – April 17, 2020

Survive is an American thriller drama television series written by Richard Abate and Jeremy Ungar that debuted on Quibi on April 6, 2020. It is based on the novel of the same name by Alex Morel.

== Premise ==
Two ordinary people, Jane and Paul, are the only survivors of a plane crash that isolates them on a remote snow-covered mountain.

Soon this unlikely duo will have to find a way to get back to society as Jane herself struggles with depression and her own personal demons while Paul does everything to try and keep her safe.

== Cast ==
- Sophie Turner as Jane
- Corey Hawkins as Paul
- Terence Maynard as Doctor M
- Laurel Marsden as Kara
- Elliott Wooster as Phil
- Lewis Hayes as Chad
- Makgotso M as New Girl
- Jennifer Martin as Nurse Leslie
- Marta Timofeeva as Young Jane
- Jo Stone-Fewings as Jane's Father
- Caroline Goodall as Jane's Mother

== Episodes ==
| No. | Title | Directed by | Written by | Original release date |
|---|---|---|---|---|
| 1 | "Welcome to Life House" | Mark Pellington | Richard Abate & Jeremy Ungar | April 6, 2020 |
Jane, a woman diagnosed with depression and PTSD, struggles to find her place at Life House, a home for people who have social disorders.
| 2 | "A Handful of Oblivion" | Mark Pellington | Richard Abate & Jeremy Ungar | April 6, 2020 |
After leaving Life House, Jane arrives at an airport where she meets another passenger named Paul.
| 3 | "Please Remain Seated" | Mark Pellington | Richard Abate & Jeremy Ungar | April 6, 2020 |
With suicide on her mind, Jane boards the plane ready for departure. However, a blizzard causes the plane to crash, knocking Jane unconscious while all the passengers except Paul are killed.
| 4 | "Sweet Dreams and Flying Machines" | Mark Pellington | Richard Abate & Jeremy Ungar | April 7, 2020 |
Having survived the plane crash, Jane and Paul find shelter in the ruins of the downed plane.
| 5 | "You Can Die Here Alone" | Mark Pellington | Richard Abate & Jeremy Ungar | April 8, 2020 |
Paul and Jane argue the merits of leaving their shelter at the top of a mountain.
| 6 | "Don't Look Down" | Mark Pellington | Richard Abate & Jeremy Ungar | April 9, 2020 |
Climbing down the mountain, Paul and Jane find themselves in a tough spot.
| 7 | "I Can't Hear You" | Mark Pellington | Richard Abate & Jeremy Ungar | April 10, 2020 |
Paul and Jane find shelter inside a cave on a snowy mountain and face an avalanche.
| 8 | "The Weight" | Mark Pellington | Richard Abate & Jeremy Ungar | April 13, 2020 |
| 9 | "Exit Strategy" | Mark Pellington | Richard Abate & Jeremy Ungar | April 14, 2020 |
| 10 | "What Does This Say About Us?" | Mark Pellington | Richard Abate & Jeremy Ungar | April 15, 2020 |
| 11 | "A Hundred Echoes" | Mark Pellington | Richard Abate & Jeremy Ungar | April 16, 2020 |
| 12 | "Where Memories Live" | Mark Pellington | Richard Abate & Jeremy Ungar | April 17, 2020 |
Jane awakes in a hospital. Her mother informs her that Paul was found, dead, the day after her rescue. She gives Jane a note found with him, in which he tells Jane that their experience has made her stronger, a survivor, and that he "will always be in [her] heart, where memories live."

== Reception ==
On Rotten Tomatoes, the series has a 58% rating with an average score of 6.94 out of 10 based on 26 reviews. The site's critical consensus read: "Though Survive struggles under the weight of its subject matter and limited runtime, it's further proof that the incredibly talented Sophie Turner is worthy of bigger, better roles."

== Accolades ==
| Year | Award | Category | Nominee(s) | Result | Ref. |
|---|---|---|---|---|---|
| 2020 | Primetime Emmy Awards | Outstanding Actor in a Short Form Comedy or Drama Series | Corey Hawkins | Nominated | |
| 2021 | Visual Effects Society Awards | Outstanding Supporting Visual Effects in a Photoreal Episode | Ariel Altman, Rae Welty, Caius Wong and Carl Fong | Nominated | |
