= Mountain Rest (film) =

- Film poster
- Directed by: Alex O Eaton
- Written by: Alex O Eaton
- Produced by: Fernando Loureiro; Renata Nascimento; Roberto Vasconcellos
- Starring: Natalia Dyer; Frances Conroy
- Cinematography: Ashley Connor
- Edited by: Kate Abernathy
- Production companies: Exhibit; Automatik Entertainment
- Distributed by: FilmRise
- Release date: May 12, 2018 (Nashville)
- Running time: 92 minutes
- Country: United States
- Language: English

Mountain Rest is a 2018 American independent drama film written and directed by Alex O Eaton and starring Natalia Dyer and Frances Conroy.

== Plot ==
After years without contact, Ethel, an aging actress, asks her estranged daughter and granddaughter, Frankie and Clara, home for the weekend to attend an extravagant party. At 16, Clara has never met any extended family, and her grandmother’s eccentric nature is infectious. Clara is drawn deeper into her grandmother's fantasies and disillusionments, causing the rift in Clara’s relationship with her mother to widen. Meanwhile, Frankie is left to battle her own demons and face a love she left behind. These tensions culminate as Ethel’s ulterior motive for the weekend’s festivities force everyone to reconsider the roles they play in each other’s lives, and the worth of family as a whole.

== Cast ==
- Natalia Dyer as Clara
- Shawn Hatosy as Bascolm
- Frances Conroy as Ethel
- Kate Lyn Sheil as Frankie
- Joshua Brady as Sam
- Karson Kern as Jim Ferris
- Alphie Hyorth as Nixon
- Audrey Turner as Courtey
