= Dead of Winter (2025 film) =

2025 action thriller film by Brian Kirk

- US theatrical release poster
- Directed by: Brian Kirk
- Written by: Nicholas Jacobson-Larson; Dalton Leeb
- Produced by: Jon Berg; Jonas Katzenstein; Maximilian Leo; Greg Silverman
- Starring: Emma Thompson; Judy Greer; Marc Menchaca; Laurel Marsden; Brían F. O'Byrne
- Cinematography: Christopher Ross
- Edited by: Tim Murrell
- Music by: Volker Bertelmann
- Production companies: Stampede Ventures; Augenschein Filmproduktion; Film- und Medienstiftung NRW; MMC Studios; Stampede Studios; Wild Bunch Germany; Zweites Deutsches Fernsehen
- Distributed by: Vertical (United States); Leonine Distribution (Germany)
- Release dates: August 8, 2025 (Locarno); September 26, 2025 (United States); February 19, 2026 (Germany)
- Running time: 98 minutes
- Countries: United States; Germany
- Language: English
- Box office: $2 million

Dead of Winter is a 2025 action thriller film directed by Brian Kirk and written by Nicholas Jacobson-Larson and Dalton Leeb. It stars Emma Thompson, Judy Greer, Marc Menchaca, and Laurel Marsden.

The film had its world premiere in the Piazza Grande section of the 78th Locarno Film Festival on August 8, 2025, before its theatrical release on September 26, 2025.

== Plot ==
After her husband Karl's death, widow Barb sets out to fulfill his last request to have his ashes scattered in remote Lake Hilda in northern Minnesota, where the two had their first date. During a snowstorm as she drives there, she takes an unintended detour to a nearby cabin and asks a suspicious looking man, Camo Jacket, for directions. She notices blood on the snow, which he says is from a deer. When Barb reaches the lake, she sees Leah, a young woman with her hands bound, trying to escape from Camo Jacket, but he retrieves her.

Barb returns to the cabin to investigate, finds the young woman chained in the basement, and overhears the man talking to his wife, Purple Lady. Purple Lady finds Barb's mitten outside the house, along with evidence that she had been communicating with the kidnapped girl. They go in search of her.

Barb sets up her husband's ice-fishing shack on the frozen lake as a trap. The couple approaches with guns, and Camo Jacket falls through a concealed hole in the ice. Meanwhile, Barb enters their cabin and, failing to free Leah, douses the fire and soaks all of the clothing, blankets and curtains in water. The couple returns, and Purple Lady shoots Barb in the arm before she escapes. Barb returns to her truck, which has had its wiring torn apart.

Camo Jacket is hypothermic from falling into the water, so Purple Lady searches for Barb on her own. Barb sneaks back to the cabin and breaks into Camo Jacket's car to use the CB radio to call for help, before he interrupts her. They scuffle, and Barb stabs him in the foot. It is revealed that Purple Lady is a terminally sick hospital employee. Leah, who had been admitted to the hospital after a suicide attempt, is their target to have her liver harvested to save Purple Lady's life, but time is running out. Barb convinces Camo Jacket to drive to the nearest town and get the police before going to the hospital himself. He agrees but on the way is intercepted by Purple Lady.

Barb burns her truck to act as a distress signal. Two hunters meet her on the road, and they all drive back to investigate the cabin, but Purple Lady shoots and kills the hunters. Barb finds Camo Jacket dead in her car as a decoy. Barb shoots Purple Lady in the leg, but Purple Lady knocks her out, and Barb awakens chained in the basement with Leah. Barb frees herself, but Purple Lady catches her before they can escape. Purple Lady forces Barb and Leah to accompany her back to the lake at gunpoint.

Arriving at a makeshift medical tent in the middle of the lake, Purple Lady forces Barb to duct tape Leah to a surgical bed and hurriedly marks Leah's torso for the liver removal. Purple Lady and Barb fight, starting a fire in the tent, while Leah frees herself, and all three of them escape the burning tent onto the ice. Barb handcuffs Purple Lady to her and drags them both into the icy water. As the wounded women sink to their deaths, Barb releases a metal box of her husband's ashes. Leah, now safe, looks at a photo of Barb and her husband taken on their first date, then walks towards the shore.

== Cast ==
- Emma Thompson as Barb
  - Gaia Wise as young Barb
- Judy Greer as Purple Lady
- Paul Hamilton as Karl
  - Cúán Hosty-Blaney as young Karl
- Marc Menchaca as Camo Jacket
- Laurel Marsden as Leah
- Brían F. O'Byrne as Tall Hunter
- Dalton Leeb as younger Hunter
- Lloyd Hutchinson as Lawyer

== Production ==
In February 2024, it was announced that an action-thriller film titled The Fisherwoman was in development with Brian Kirk directing and Nicholas Jacobson-Larson and Dalton Leeb writing the screenplay. The film was produced by Jon Berg and Greg Silverman of Stampede Ventures, Jonas Katzenstein and Maximilian Leo of Augenschein Filmproduktion.

Laurel Marsden, Emma Thompson and Judy Greer were cast in the lead roles, alongside Gaia Wise and Marc Menchaca. Principal photography began on February 26, in Koli, Finland and North Rhine-Westphalia, Germany. In Finland, Thompson praised the skills of the local working crew, even writing a laudatory letter dedicated to the Finns, published by Helsingin Sanomat. Because of this, the Finnish president Alexander Stubb personally called Thompson and thanked the actress "for her beautiful words, trust in Finns and welcomed her back to Finland". Filming wrapped in June 2024.

== Title ==
The film was originally announced in February 2024 under the title The Fisherwoman. In March 2025, the film was retitled to The Dead of Winter, with Vertical acquiring North American rights, before being shortened to the official title Dead of Winter in August 2025.

== Release ==
Dead of Winter premiered on August 8, 2025, at the 78th Locarno International Film Festival in Locarno, Switzerland. The film was then released in U.S. theaters on September 26, 2025, by distributor Vertical.

== Reception ==
On the review aggregator website Rotten Tomatoes, 76% of 88 critics' reviews are positive, with an average rating of 6.4/10. The website's consensus reads: "Emma Thompson takes a polar plunge into action territory with Dead of Winter, a chilly thriller that wears one too many layers of backstory but still satisfies as a tense showcase for its estimable star." Metacritic, which uses a weighted average, assigned the film a score of 69 out of 100, based on 14 critics, indicating "generally favorable" reviews.
