= Things Heard & Seen =

2021 American horror film

- Official release poster
- Directed by: Shari Springer Berman; Robert Pulcini
- Screenplay by: Shari Springer Berman; Robert Pulcini
- Based on: All Things Cease to Appear by Elizabeth Brundage
- Produced by: Stefanie Azpiazu; Anthony Bregman; Julie Cohen; Peter Cron
- Starring: Amanda Seyfried; James Norton
- Cinematography: Larry Smith
- Edited by: Louise Ford
- Music by: Peter Raeburn
- Production company: Likely Story
- Distributed by: Netflix
- Release date: April 29, 2021
- Running time: 121 minutes
- Country: United States
- Language: English

Things Heard & Seen is a 2021 American horror film written and directed by Shari Springer Berman and Robert Pulcini, based on the novel All Things Cease to Appear by Elizabeth Brundage. It stars Amanda Seyfried and James Norton. Described as "a Swedenborgian thriller", the film references the teachings of 18th-century theologian Emanuel Swedenborg.

Things Heard & Seen was released on April 29, 2021, by Netflix, and received mostly negative reviews from critics. A number of landscape paintings from the Hudson River School feature prominently throughout the film.

== Plot ==
In 1980, Catherine Claire, an art restorer, lives in Manhattan with her husband George and daughter Franny. When George lands a job teaching art history at a college, the family moves into a large farmhouse in upstate New York.

Catherine, who has bulimia, feels isolated in the house. She finds an old Bible containing a family tree of the previous owners, the Smits; some of the names are scratched out and marked "Damned." She senses a spirit and sees strange lights leading her to an antique ring, which she begins wearing. Franny sees a female spirit in her room and insists on sleeping with her parents. Catherine employs brothers Eddie and Cole Lucks as handyman and babysitter while George starts an affair with Eddie's cousin Willis.

Catherine befriends George's colleague Justine Sokolov. George invites Floyd DeBeers, the head of the art history department, to his home. Floyd feels the presence of a soul but assures Catherine that the spirit is benevolent and offers to hold a séance. George and Catherine throw a party, where Catherine finds out the previous owners, who died in a murder-suicide, were Eddie and Cole's parents, and that her ring belonged to their mother Ella. She confronts George about the house's violent history. As they argue, a radio begins playing, only stopping when George smashes it. Catherine asks George to take Franny to his parents' house.

While George is gone, Catherine and Floyd hold a séance and the ghost of Ella is summoned. Floyd tells Catherine that there is another spirit in the house and that she should be careful. Catherine discovers George's affair with Willis. On a class trip, Justine overhears a conversation between George and his dissertation advisor, who asks how he was hired without a letter of recommendation. Floyd confronts George, who admits to forging a recommendation. At a family dinner, Catherine learns that the paintings George claimed were his work were actually painted by his cousin, who drowned in a boating accident. Her trust shattered, Catherine begins an affair with Eddie.

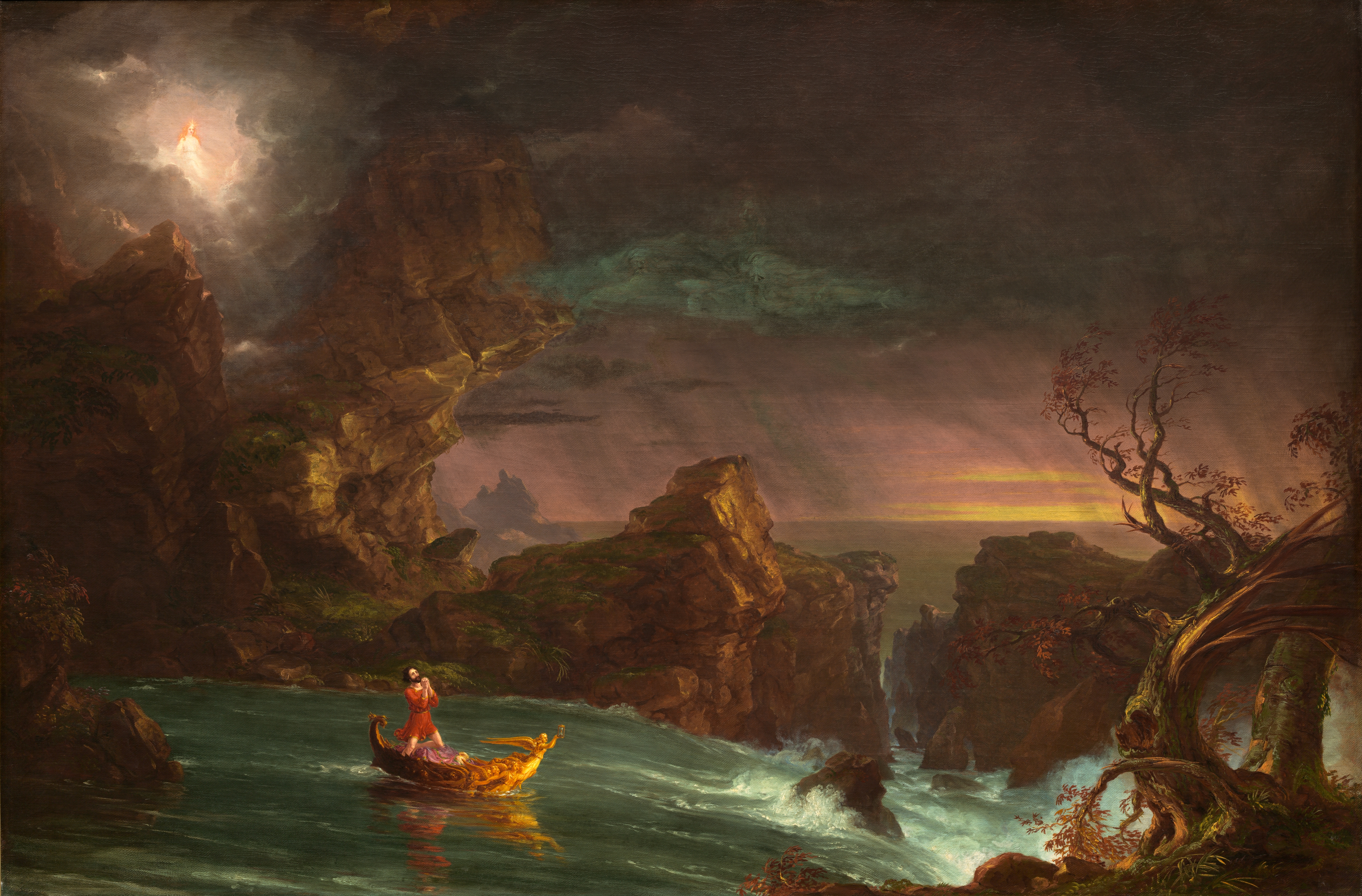
Manhood, from a series of paintings called The Voyage of Life by Hudson River School founder Thomas Cole

On a boat ride, George fails to dissuade Floyd from reporting him. Later, a soaked George returns to campus (with Floyd nowhere to be seen), where Justine confronts him about his affair with Willis. George follows her car and runs her off the road, putting her into a coma. Catherine learns of Floyd's death and Justine's accident. In George's classroom, a mystical painting of death and a Christian cross from a book that Floyd gave him is suddenly projected on a screen. George can't make it go away, which infuriates him and sends him running from the class.

Back home, Catherine prepares to leave with Franny. George drugs her and murders her with an axe. In the morning, Cole comes to babysit, finding instructions from George not to disturb Catherine as she is ill. George returns home from campus, where he has been given Floyd's office and position, and pretends to discover Catherine's body. The police suspect he is responsible but have no proof, so they release him. He takes Franny to his parents' home in Connecticut.

Catherine's soul joins forces with Ella's. They awaken Justine and show her what George did. Justine speaks to the police. To avoid being arrested, George tries to escape on his cousin's boat. A storm arrives and George's boat disappears in flames, a scene that resembles the painting seen earlier. However, the cross in this painting is upside down, indicating that George is damned.

== Cast ==
- Amanda Seyfried as Catherine Claire
- James Norton as George Claire
- Ana Sophia Heger as Franny Claire
- Natalia Dyer as Willis Howell
- Alex Neustaedter as Eddie Vayle
- Rhea Seehorn as Justine Sokolov
- Michael O'Keefe as Travis Laughton
- Karen Allen as Mare Laughton
- Jack Gore as Cole Vayle
- F. Murray Abraham as Floyd DeBeers
- James Urbaniak as Bram Sokolov
- Emily Dorsch as Ella Vayle

== Production ==
In September 2019, it was announced Amanda Seyfried had joined the cast, with Shari Springer Berman and Robert Pulcini directing from a screenplay they wrote. Netflix would distribute. In October 2019, James Norton, Natalia Dyer, Rhea Seehorn, Alex Neustaedter and F. Murray Abraham joined the cast, and principal photography commenced that month in Hudson Valley, New York.

== Reception ==
On review aggregator Rotten Tomatoes, the film holds an approval rating of 39% based on 88 reviews. The website's critics consensus reads, "The terrors in Things Heard & Seen are overwhelmed by a banal and uninspired adaptation that fails to connect to its haunting source material." On Metacritic, it has a weighted average score of 49 out of 100, based on 24 critics, indicating "mixed or average reviews".

KKFI's Russ Simmons gave the film a mixed review, stating: "The filmmakers create an eerie atmosphere that carries the movie even as it goes a bit off the rails in the finale." Albert Nowicki of His Name is Death believed that "the film is the most interesting when it tells the story of a doomed relationship, putting the toxic marriage under a microscope". He also noted that Things Heard & Seen was not as captivating as a horror film, as it was too similar to Robert Zemeckis' What Lies Beneath (2000). Noel Murray wrote in The Los Angeles Times, "while the cast is great, the milieu is vivid, the images are polished and the atmosphere is effectively moody, Things Heard & Seen fails to connect on a visceral level."

Johnny Oleksinski's review in The New York Post was mildly positive, stating "Things Heard & Seen is an adequate haunted-house film, to be sure," and "while not in the same league as A Quiet Place and Charlie Kaufman's oddball Netflix thriller, it has a spooky atmosphere and an appealingly slow boil." Jocelyn Noveck's review for the Associated Press called the film "well-cast and often entertaining but campy and sometimes obvious". Noveck also appraised the film as "a Swedenborgian thriller" for its references to the teachings of 18th-century theologian Emanuel Swedenborg. References to Swedenborg's work include the film's opening quote—"Things that are in heaven are more real than things that are in the world"—and presence of ghosts.
