= Twitch (film) =

- Twitch
- Directed by: Leah Meyerhoff
- Written by: Leah Meyerhoff
- Produced by: Sean Warner
- Starring: Emma Galvin; Peter Corrie; Toni Meyerhoff
- Edited by: Leah Meyerhoff
- Release date: January 25, 2005
- Running time: 10 minutes
- Country: United States
- Language: English

Twitch is a Student Academy Award-nominated short film directed by Leah Meyerhoff and starring Emma Galvin, Peter Corrie and Toni Meyerhoff.

Twitch kicked off the film festival circuit by winning a Grand Jury Prize at Slamdance and going on to screen in over 200 film festivals worldwide. Twitch has since won over a dozen international awards and is currently airing on the Independent Film Channel and Skandinavia TV.

== Plot ==
Twitch tells the story of a young girl torn between two worlds: her domestic life, where she must care for her mother who uses a wheelchair, and her escape into the emerging world of sexuality with her eager, hormone-addled boyfriend. Leah's mother plays the Mother role in an essentially autobiographical role for the filmmaker. The making of the film was a component of the IFC series Film School, chronicling the first time filmmaking efforts of four New York University graduate film school students.

== Cast ==
- Emma Galvin as Daughter
- Peter Corrie as Boyfriend
- Toni Meyerhoff as Mother

== Awards ==
- Student Academy Awards — Finalist
- Slamdance — Honorable Mention
- Avignon Film Festival — Best American Short
- Rhode Island International Film Festival — Honorable Mention
- Golden Star Shorts Fest — Best of Fest
- Golden Star Shorts Fest — Best Narrative Short
- Brooklyn International Disability Film Festival — Best Short
- Scottsdale International Film Festival — Best Student Short
- West Chester Film Festival — Best Female Director
- Berkeley Film Festival — Grand Festival Award
- Rebel Film Festival — Best Experimental Short
- Brown Emerging Filmmakers — Best Drama
- Ole Muddy Film Festival — First Place
- Harry M. Warner Film Festival — Third Place
- Sound Space — Post Award
- Calgary International Film Festival — Honorable Mention
- California Independent Film Festival — Best Mini Short Nominee
- Swansea Bay Film Festival — Best Drama Nominee
- Pawky Little Film Contest — Finalist
- Trenton Film Festival — Best Actress Nominee

== Festivals ==
- Annapolis Film Festival
- Antimatter Film Festival
- Arpa International Film Festival
- Atlanta Film Festival
- Avignon Film Festival
- Backseat Film Festival
- Big Bear Lake Film Festival
- Boston Underground Film Festival
- Boxurshorts Film Festival
- Brainwash Film Festival
- Brighton Film Festival
- Brooklyn Cinema Series
- Brooklyn International Disability Film Festival
- Brooklyn International Film Festival
- Brooklyn Underground Film Festival
- Calgary International Film Festival
- California Independent Film Festival
- Cannes Film Festival
- Cardiff Film Festival
- Chicago International Film Festival
- Cinechico Film Festival
- Cinema Paradise
- Clermont-Ferrand Film Festival
- Cork International Film Festival
- Dance and Shout Film Festival
- Daytona Beach Film Festival
- DC Shorts Film Festival
- DC Underground Film Festival]
- Ellensburg Film Festival
- Film Platform
- First Look Film Festival
- First Run Film Festival
- Fylmz Festival
- Girlfest Hawaii
- Global Art Film Festival
- Golden Star Shorts Fest
- Great Lakes Film Festival
- Her Voice Her View Film Festival
- Hi Mom Film Festival
- Holly Shorts Film Festival
- Hudson Valley Film Festival
- Inflatable Duck Film Festival
- Ladyfest Humboldt
- Ladyfest San Diego
- Ladyfest Stockholm
- Los Angeles Short Film Festival
- Lost Film Fest
- Malibu International Film Festival
- Marblehead Film Festival
- Milan International Film Festival
- New Filmmakers
- Newport Beach Film Festival
- Newport International Film Festival
- Next Frame Film Festival
- Nolita Film Festival
- NYC Home Film Festival
- Ohio Independent Film Festival
- Ojai Film Festival
- Ole Muddy Film Festival
- Ozark Film Festival
- Palm Springs International Short Film Festival
- Planet Ant Film Festival
- Poppy Jasper Film Festival
- Portland Underground Film Festival
- Provincetown International Film Festival
- Queens International Film Festival
- Reel Heart International Film Festival
- Reel Women International Film Festival
- Rhode Island International Film Festival
- Rome International Film Festival
- Route 66 Film Festival
- San Diego Women Film Festival
- San Francisco Independent Film Festival
- San Francisco Women's Film Festival
- Sarasota Film Festival
- Scottsdale International Film Festival
- Show Me Missouri Film Festival
- Silver Lake Shorts
- Slamdance Film Festival
- Small Potato Film Festival
- Swansea Bay Film Festival
- Teabag Film Workshop
- Toofy Film Festival
- Trenton Film Festival
- Vermont International Film Festival
- Waterfront Film Festival
- West Chester Film Festival
- Wichita Film Festival
- Wildsound Film Festival
- Williamsburg Short Film Festival
- Women in Film Film Festival
- Woodstock Film Festival
- Youth for Human Rights Film Festival
- Zion International Film Festival

== Reviews ==
Doug Brunell of Film Threat gave Twitch three stars, saying that "Twitch is a story about fear, love, and an uncertain future. Meyerhoff has secured her place in film with this short movie. She's done a story that is as honest as it is touching. Her ability to sum up a young girl's life in ten minutes is remarkable."

Virginia Heffernan of The New York Times wrote that "Leah is an artsy American" and Elaine Mak of New England Film said that "award-winning director Leah Meyerhoff has built up a large list of accomplishments as a filmmaker."

Jennifer Modenessi of the Contra Costa Times said that "when the story is as good as filmmaker Leah Meyerhoff's, you can't help but be drawn in" and Ben Beard of Film Monthly said that "Twitch is a hard but impressive little film. The travails of growing up, the immense pain of post-adolescence, the terror of the big nasty world resting just outside our windows: Twitch augers in the universal places of hurt in the human brain. We can take solace that Meyerhoff is now working on her first feature-length film. Twitch shows great promise; we now must wait for Meyerhoff's talents to fully bloom."
