= Tina Manning =

Paiute-Shoshone water rights activist (1950–1979)

- Tina Manning (left), John Trudell and two of their children
- Born: January 18, 1950
- Died: February 12, 1979 (aged 29)
- Education: Bacone College
- Spouse: John Trudell
- Children: 3

Tina Manning (January 18, 1950 – February 12, 1979) was a Paiute-Shoshone water rights activist and wife of John Trudell. Manning was the daughter of Arthur and Leah Hicks Manning. Her father had served as the tribal chairman of the Shoshone-Paiute Tribes of the Duck Valley Indian Reservation in northern Nevada. She graduated from Bacone College in Muskogee, Oklahoma.

On February 12, 1979, Manning died along with her unborn baby Josiah Hawk, three other children; Ricarda Star, Sunshine Karma, and Eli Changing Sun, and her mother, in a house fire on the Duck Valley Reservation. Her father was the only survivor. The cause of the fire was never determined, but it was considered suspicious by John Trudell and others and deemed probable arson, as it took place the day after Trudell led a protest against the FBI in Washington, D.C.
