= I Believe in Unicorns =

- Theatrical release poster
- Directed by: Leah Meyerhoff
- Written by: Leah Meyerhoff
- Produced by: Heather Rae
- Starring: Natalia Dyer; Peter Vack; Julia Garner; Amy Seimetz; Toni Meyerhoff
- Cinematography: Jarin Blaschke
- Edited by: Rebecca Laks; Michael Taylor
- Music by: Sasha Gordon
- Production company: Animals on Parade
- Distributed by: Gravitas Ventures
- Release dates: March 9, 2014 (SXSW); May 29, 2015 (United States)
- Running time: 80 minutes
- Country: United States
- Languages: English; Spanish

I Believe in Unicorns is a 2014 American independent coming-of-age romantic drama film written and directed by Leah Meyerhoff. The film stars Natalia Dyer, Peter Vack, Julia Garner, Amy Seimetz, and Toni Meyerhoff. The film was released on May 29, 2015, by Gravitas Ventures.

== Plot ==
Davina is a high-school sophomore from Berkeley. She lives with and takes care of her mother, who has multiple sclerosis. Her father is out of the picture, having abandoned her mother shortly after Davina was born.

Davina celebrates her 16th birthday by having a picnic at the park with her best friend, Cassidy, who gives her a camera as a birthday present. There at the park, Davina discovers Sterling, a punk who hangs out with his skateboarder friends at the park's ramp. Davina develops a crush on Sterling and takes several photographs of him with her camera. Eventually, Sterling crosses paths with Davina and they introduce each other. Sterling requests that they meet again the next day at a street corner near the park; Davina grants his request.

Davina and Sterling spend the next day with each other. As they get to know each other, Davina learns from Sterling that his mother and he left his father as a result of his beating them. Davina and Sterling also confide in each other their mutual desire to be "anywhere but here". That night, Sterling takes Davina to his abode, located in a slum. There, they kiss at first, but it gets passionate and Davina performs fellatio on Sterling. Davina realizes she has fallen in love with Sterling and confesses in private about her sexual episode to Cassidy.

The next evening, Davina returns to Sterling's abode, where a rave is taking place. There, she reunites with Sterling and attempts to seduce him by kissing him and telling him that she missed him. However, Sterling rejects her and implies that their sexual encounter was a casual fling. Davina is heartbroken at first, but Sterling eventually apologizes to her and the two of them pursue a sexual relationship.

After contemplating for some time about being "anywhere but here", Davina and Sterling make it official by leaving Berkeley and embarking on a road trip together. As the two of them spend more time together, though, they start to become increasingly combative and argumentative, particularly when Davina compares Sterling to his father. At one point, Davina suggests that they head back to Berkeley, but Sterling feels intent that they carry on with their journey.

One night, Davina and Sterling spend the night squatting in a motel room. Davina asks Sterling if he really likes her or if it is just temporary, but he does not answer and says she is beautiful. While playing around with each other in bed, Sterling suddenly gets angrily defensive toward Davina after she slaps him. He threatens her to never hit him again and assaults her as a warning. The next day, Davina and Sterling go to a barn, where she tells him she wants to go home. Sterling, in response, suffers a mental breakdown and Davina attempts to comfort him out of guilt. They make out once more and begin to have one last sexual encounter, but when she hesitates, Sterling rapes her. Their relationship comes to a standstill, and Davina returns home to her mother via a car ride from Cassidy.

== Cast ==
- Natalia Dyer as Davina
- Peter Vack as Sterling
- Julia Garner as Cassidy
- Amy Seimetz as Clara
- Toni Meyerhoff as Toni

== Production ==
Early in development, the film was initially titled Unicorns. Leah Meyerhoff views her 2005 short film Twitch as a “precursor” to I Believe in Unicorns and that the feature film “wasn’t a direct expansion of the short.” Meyerhoff admits the film is “semi-autobiographical” and that she cast her real-life mother, Toni, as Davina's mother before casting Dyer.

Meyerhoff had learned of Dyer through a tipoff from the casting team of True Grit (2010), where Dyer auditioned for the Mattie Ross role played by Hailee Steinfeld.

According to Meyerhoff, the live-action scenes in the film were shot in three weeks in the San Francisco Bay Area. Meyerhoff also said the budget for the animation scenes was under $5,000. Also according to Meyerhoff, Peter Vack "researched (his) role by hanging out with local punk kids in the area." Meyerhoff claims I Believe in Unicorns was "one of the last features to shoot on Fuji 16 mm film stock, they no longer make it."

== Release ==
The film premiered at SXSW on March 9, 2014, and was released on May 29, 2015, by Gravitas Ventures.

== Reception ==
On the review aggregator website Rotten Tomatoes, 84% of 19 critics' reviews are positive. Metacritic, which uses a weighted average, assigned the film a score of 73 out of 100, based on 9 critics, indicating "generally favorable" reviews.

Brian Tallerico of RogerEbert.com awarded the film three stars out of four. The New York Times gave the film a positive review, and wrote, "Stretched to 80 minutes, the story (by the director Leah Meyerhoff) almost breaks; that it holds together without compromising its simplicity or emotional authenticity only proves that, contrary to the maxim, you don’t need a gun if you’ve got the right girl."

Joe Leydon of Variety also gave the film a positive review, calling it "a familiar but affecting coming-of-age tale."
