= Trudell =

- Directed by: Heather Rae
- Written by: B. Russell Friedenberg
- Produced by: Heather Rae; Elyse Katz
- Cinematography: Gilbert Salas; Heather Rae
- Edited by: Gregory Bayne; Heather Rae
- Music by: John Trudell & Bad Dog
- Release dates: January 20, 2005 (Sundance Film Festival); February 24, 2006 (United States)
- Running time: 80 minutes
- Country: United States

Trudell is a 2005 documentary film about American Indian activist and poet John Trudell. The film traces Trudell's life from his childhood in Omaha, Nebraska, through his role as a leader of the American Indian Movement. It also covers his rebirth as a musician and spoken word poet after his wife died in a house fire suspected as arson.

Heather Rae produced and directed the film, which took her more than a decade to complete. Trudell aired nationally in the U.S. on April 11, 2006 as part of the Independent Lens series on PBS.

== Reception ==
The film received generally mixed reviews from critics.

... one of the most prominent and passionate advocates for Native American rights. ... [John Trudell] deserves more daring and objective scrutiny than this overly reverent tribute.

— Jeanette Catsoulis, The New York Times

By preaching so relentlessly to the choir, this film misses an opportunity to show what got them to sing in the first place.

— Kenneth Turan, Los Angeles Times

Despite the rambling finish, however, overall the film is a thought-provoking and graceful portrait of a tenacious peace warrior whose frankness is his greatest weapon.

— Erin Meister, The Boston Globe
