= All Fun and Games =

2023 film by Ari Costa & Eren Celeboglu

- Theatrical release poster
- Directed by: Ari Costa; Eren Celeboglu
- Written by: Ari Costa; Eren Celeboglu; J.J. Braider
- Story by: J.J. Braider
- Produced by: Angela Russo-Otstot; Jake Aust; Kassee Whiting; John Zois
- Starring: Asa Butterfield; Natalia Dyer; Benjamin Evan Ainsworth; Laurel Marsden; Annabeth Gish
- Cinematography: Ricardo Diaz
- Edited by: Louis Cioffi; Ruthie Aslan
- Music by: Alex Belcher
- Production companies: Gozie AGBO; Anton
- Distributed by: Vertical Entertainment
- Release date: September 1, 2023
- Running time: 76 minutes
- Country: United States
- Language: English
- Box office: $1.5 million

All Fun and Games is a 2023 American horror film written by Ari Costa, Eren Celeboglu and JJ Braider, directed by Costa and Celeboglu and starring Asa Butterfield, Natalia Dyer, and Benjamin Evan Ainsworth. It is Costa and Celeboglu's feature directorial debut.

== Plot ==
A group of teens in Salem, Massachusetts, discover a cursed knife that unleashes a demon which forces them to play gruesome, deadly versions of childhood games where there can be no winners, only survivors.

== Cast ==
- Asa Butterfield as Marcus Fletcher, Kathy's second son
- Natalia Dyer as Billie Fletcher, Kathy's older daughter
- Benjamin Evan Ainsworth as Jonah Fletcher, Kathy's younger son
- Laurel Marsden as Sophie Fletcher, Kathy's middle daughter
- Annabeth Gish as Kathy Fletcher, the Fletcher's mother
- Marina Stephenson Kerr as Joanna Good
- Kolton Stewart as Pete
- Erik Athavale as Bob
- Matthew Lupu as Nick
- Sydney Sabiston as Pilar
- Summer H. Howell as Demon / Daniel Good
- Keishon Joseph as Brad

== Production ==
In January 2022, it was announced that Butterfield and Dyer were cast in the film.

In April 2022, it was announced that principal photography began in Canada and that Gish and Ainsworth were added to the cast. Later that same month, Marsden and Stewart were also added to the cast. Keith David was attached to appear in the film.

In July 2022, it was announced that Cutting Edge Media Music acquired the rights to the film's original score.

The film started post-production in November 2022.

== Release ==
In July 2023, it was announced that Vertical Entertainment acquired North American distribution rights to the film.

All Fun and Games was released on September 1, 2023.

== Reception ==
On the review aggregator website Rotten Tomatoes, 33% of 9 critics' reviews are positive.

Paul Lê of Bloody Disgusting awarded the film three "skulls" out of five, writing that "the film is well made in most respects, and because of its time-effective execution (...) never overstays its welcome." Matt Donato of IGN gave the film a negative review, calling the film "an appetizer of a movie served as the main course."
