= Richard Nord =

American film editor

- Education: Queens College; New York University Tisch School of the Arts
- Occupation: Film editor
- Years active: 1981–present

Richard Nord is an American film editor. He is best known for his work on The Fugitive (1993), which earned him Academy Award, ACE Eddie Award, and British Academy Film Award nominations.

== Partial filmography ==
- The Last Full Measure (2019)
- Nancy Drew and the Hidden Staircase (2019)
- Beyond the Sky (2018)
- ZBurbs (2017)
- Alex & the List (2017)
- Replace (2017)
- Shattered (2017)
- Vendetta (2015)
- Walking with the Enemy (2013)
- 10 Rules for Sleeping Around (2013)
- There Be Dragons (2011)
- Preacher's Kid (2010)
- Sex and Lies in Sin City (2008)
- You and I (2008)
- Captivity (2007)
- .45 (2006)
- American Gun (2005)
- Aurora Borealis (2005)
- Sawtooth (2004)
- The Battle of Shaker Heights (2003)
- 11:14 (2003)
- Two Weeks Notice (2002)
- Joshua (2002)
- The Feast of All Saints (2001)
- The Jennie Project (2001)
- The Color of Friendship (2000)
- The Watcher (2000)
- The Rage: Carrie 2 (1999)
- Body Count (1998)
- Species II (1998)
- Phat Beach (1996)
- Fled (1996)
- Getting Away with Murder (1996)
- Pentathlon (1994)
- Renaissance Man (1994)
- The Fugitive (1993)
- Passenger 57 (1992)
- A Fine Romance (1991)
- Strictly Business (1991)
- Working Girl (1988)
- Biloxi Blues (1988)
- Nadine (1987)
- Making Mr. Right (1987)
- Heartburn (1986)
- Hannah and Her Sisters (1986)
- The Purple Rose of Cairo (1985)
- Broadway Danny Rose (1984)
- Zelig (1983)
- A Midsummer Night's Sex Comedy (1982)
- Wolfen (1981)

== Awards and nominations ==
Major associations
Year	Award	Category	Nominated work	Result	Ref.
1994	66th Academy Awards	Best Film Editing	The Fugitive	Nominated	
1994	44th ACE Eddie Awards	Best Edited Feature Film	The Fugitive	Nominated	
1994	47th British Academy Film Awards	Best Editing	The Fugitive	Nominated	
