= After Darkness (2019 film) =

2019 American-Mexican science fiction film by Batán Silva

- Directed by: Batán Silva
- Written by: Fernando Diez Barroso
- Produced by: Fernando Diez Barroso; Monica Aguirre; Mia Chang; Barrett J. Klausman
- Starring: Tim Daly; Natalia Dyer; Kyra Sedgwick
- Cinematography: Roger Pistole
- Edited by: Roberto Silvi; Larry Madaras
- Music by: Daniel Hidalgo Valdés
- Production companies: Camelia Entertainment; Dream Walker Films
- Distributed by: Grindstone Entertainment Group
- Release date: January 15, 2019
- Running time: 98 minutes
- Countries: United States; Mexico
- Language: English

After Darkness is a 2019 American-Mexican science fiction film directed by Batán Silva and starring Tim Daly, Natalia Dyer, Kyra Sedgwick, John Patrick Amedori and Valorie Curry. It was written by Fernando Diez Barroso.

== Plot ==
As the sun burns out and darkness shrouds the planet, the wealthy Beaty family reckon with long held grudges and painful memories from the past. The family is waiting for a pre-arranged rescue from their country estate.

Strict father Raymond, always mentally abusive to his wife and kids, becomes more so as he does not get a return call from the Senator who had promised to evacuate the Beaty family to a secure facility in caves.

Wife Georgina needs a steady supply of pills to deal with the mental break caused by the suicide of teenaged daughter Abbey five years earlier following a fight with her father after the discovery that Abbey was pregnant. Eldest child Raymond Jr. (Ray) left after his sister died, telling everyone that her suicide was due to their father. Second child Fred arrives with an unexpected (the family does not communicate much) girlfriend, Margot, who is nine months pregnant. Youngest child Clara, the only one still living at home, turns 15 a few days after the others arrive. Naively, she is the most hopeful of them all.

Raymond treats the family harshly, accusing Margot of being a gold digger wanting to be saved, constantly telling Georgina that she is responsible for Abbey's death, and chasing off Brian, Ray's boyfriend, when he shows up to spend his expected final days with the man he loves.

The world is plunged into constant night. Margot gives birth the same “day” that the senator finally calls, confirming that the cave plan was unsuccessful. Raymond tells the family that their evacuation is imminent, but Ray has overheard the phone call. While the others pack and Georgina prepares a meal, Ray gathers the same type of berry that Abbey ate to painlessly poison herself. He wordlessly takes them to his mother, who understands the truth and cooks them into the meal.

Before the family can eat, two armed men enter the house, demanding supplies. After Clara mentions the caves, and Raymond reveals that they do not exist, the family loses all hope. Raymond kills one intruder and the other gives up and leaves, although not before having a taste of the poisoned meal. Margot leaves with the baby, hoping to get back to her own family before the end of life on Earth.

The Beatys huddle together against the cold, all dozing off. In the morning, they are awakened by the Sun shining through the window. It is implied that, having given up all hope the family ate the berries off-screen and are now in some form of afterlife having discussed what their death would be like shortly before they fall asleep.

The Beatys leave the house together, finally united as a family, removing their heavy jackets to enjoy the warmth of the Sun.

== Cast ==
Main cast, as credited:

- Roberto Aguire as Fred
- John Patrick Amedori as Ray
- Valorie Curry as Margot
- Sam Daly as Brian
- Tim Daly as Raymond
- Natalia Dyer as Clara
- Kyra Sedgwick as Georgina

In addition, making brief appearances in supporting roles are Christina Mandrell as Abbey, with Jeremy Childs and Jared Carter as the intruders.
