= Laurel Marsden =

American actress

- Born: October 4, 2001 (age 24)
- Occupation: Actress
- Years active: 2019–present

Laurel Marsden (born October 4, 2001) is an American actress, known for her role as Zoe Zimmer in the Marvel Cinematic Universe miniseries Ms. Marvel. Marsden began performing in theatre as a child, in addition to studying improv at The Second City throughout high school. In 2020, Marsden appeared in two episodes of the Quibi series Survive. She was cast in February 2021 in Ms. Marvel, In 2022, she was cast in the horror film All Fun and Games alongside Asa Butterfield, and in the exorcism horror The Pope's Exorcist starring Russell Crowe. That same year Marsden was initially cast as Mayfair Lipp in The Hunger Games: The Ballad of Songbirds & Snakes, though the role would ultimately be recast. She was next featured in Dead of Winter with Emma Thompson (2025).

== Filmography ==
Key
†	Denotes films that have not yet been released

=== Film ===
Year	Title	Role	Notes
2023	The Pope's Exorcist	Amy Vasquez	
2023	All Fun and Games	Sophie Fletcher	
2025	Dead of Winter	Leah	

=== Television ===
Year	Title	Role	Notes
2020	Survive	Kara	2 episodes
2022	Ms. Marvel	Zoe Zimmer	Miniseries, 3 episodes
2026	Tracker	Lola	2 episodes
