= AKA Grafitti Man =

Studio album by John Trudell
- Released: 1992
- Label: Rykodisc
- Producer: Jesse Ed Davis, Rick Eckstein

John Trudell chronology
| Fables and Other Realities (1991) | AKA Grafitti Man (1992) | Johnny Damas & Me (1994) |

AKA Grafitti Man is an album by the Native American musician John Trudell, released in 1992. The songs, parts of which were rerecorded, first appeared on four cassettes Trudell made in the 1980s and early 1990s. The aka Grafitti Man cassette, recorded with Jesse Ed Davis in 1986, was called the best album of the year by Bob Dylan. Trudell supported the album by touring with his band, the Grafitti Man Band.

== Production ==
The album was produced by Davis and Rick Eckstein, and executive produced by Jackson Browne; additional sessions and remixing occurred at Browne's home studio. While mostly employing spoken word, Trudell also added his background vocals to a few tracks. Kris Kristofferson sang on "Somebody's Kid" and "What He'd Done". "Baby Boom Ché" is about the revolutionary characteristics of early Elvis Presley. "Restless Situations" is about the end of romantic love in a relationship.

== Critical reception ==
Professional ratings
Review scores
| Source | Rating |
|---|---|
| AllMusic | 4.5/5 stars |
| Robert Christgau | A− |
| The Encyclopedia of Popular Music | 4/5 stars |
| Los Angeles Daily News | 3/4 stars |
| MusicHound World: The Essential Album Guide | 4/5 stars |

Robert Christgau wrote that "the settings, sharp studio-rock readymades keyed to the very '60s guitar of the late Jesse Ed Davis and spiced occasionally by Native American chants or drumbeats, can get you going, and Trudell takes them as his due." The Austin American-Statesman noted that Trudell "couches much of his recitations in free verse; and when he rhymes, the meter of his poetry seldom accompanies that of the accompanying music."

Rolling Stone stated that "Trudell employs basic rock, blues, traditional indigenous music, street shuffles and folk songs to craft a compelling hybrid that encompasses many viewpoints and visions of reality." The Edmonton Journal determined that, "deliberating with knowledge and grace, like a scholar-turned-actor, Trudell muses on quarrels both personal and global while gloriously emotional guitar and vocal chants underscore the context." The Colorado Springs Gazette-Telegraph listed AKA Grafitti Man as the third best album of 1992.

AllMusic wrote: "Although this is spoken word, musically these pieces are songs and not meandering ideas. Trudell's lyrics, voice, and timing also fit well with the music and never seem forced." The Encyclopedia of Popular Music deemed it "the best introduction to his work, a style that measures profundity against irascible humour."

== Track listing ==
| No. | Title | Length |
|---|---|---|
| 1. | "Rockin' the Res" |
| 2. | "Grafitti Man" |
| 3. | "Restless Situations" |
| 4. | "Wildfires" |
| 5. | "Baby Boom Ché" |
| 6. | "Bombs Over Baghdad" |
| 7. | "Rich Man's War" |
| 8. | "Somebody's Kid" |
| 9. | "Never Never Blues" |
| 10. | "What He'd Done" |
| 11. | "Beauty in a Fade" |
| 12. | "Tina Smiled" |
