= Leah Meyerhoff =

American screenwriter

- Born: December 4, 1979 (age 46); San Francisco, California, United States
- Occupations: director, producer, screenwriter, and actor
- Awards: Student Academy Award nomination for Best Narrative Short; Slamdance Honorable Mention for Best Narrative Short
- Website: http://www.leahmeyerhoff.com

Leah Meyerhoff (born December 4, 1979) is an American Student Academy Award-nominated director, producer and screenwriter. She has received attention as the writer and director of the feature film I Believe in Unicorns starring Natalia Dyer and Peter Vack. Her films have screened in over 200 film festivals worldwide and won over a dozen international awards.

== Biography ==
Leah Meyerhoff was born in San Francisco, California and attended Berkeley High School. She graduated with Honors from Brown University with a bachelor's degree in Art-Semiotics and a master's degree in Film at New York University (NYU).

Her debut feature film I Believe in Unicorns premiered at SXSW in 2014 and won the grand jury prize at the Atlanta Film Festival.

While at NYU, Meyerhoff directed Twitch, a short film portraying a young girl's irrational fear that her mother's disability is contagious. Twitch kicked off the film festival circuit by winning a Grand Jury Prize at the Slamdance Film Festival and becoming a finalist in the Student Academy Awards. It has since screened in over 200 film festivals, won a dozen awards, and was picked up for distribution by PBS, Hulu, iTunes and the Independent Film Channel.

Meyerhoff has since completed several music videos and commercials, including Team Queen, a Planet Out finalist which aired on Logo, Eternal Flame, which was in rotation on MTV Europe, and Like Our Fathers.

Meyerhoff has received press mention from The New York Times, Film Threat, Flavorpill, The San Francisco Chronicle and numerous other publications. Meyerhoff was also profiled in the docu-drama series Film School, directed by Nanette Burstein (The Kid Stays in the Picture), which continues to air on IFC.

In addition, Meyerhoff has taught directing and editing courses at New York University, The New York Film Academy, and The School of the Art Institute of Chicago. She has been a programmer for several film festivals and was recently a member of the HollyShorts and Slamdance Film Festival narrative juries.

Meyerhoff is also the founder of Film Fatales, an advocacy group for women feature film and television directors.

== Filmography ==
- I Believe in Unicorns (2014)
- Like Our Fathers (2011)
- Eternal Flame (2007)
- The Heist (2006)
- Team Queen (2006)
- Twitch (2005)
- Packaged Goods (2003)
- Neurotica (2002)
- Wonderfluff Sandwiches (2001)

== Awards ==
Twitch Awards

- Avignon Film Festival — Best American Short

Unicorns Awards

- Independent Feature Project — Emerging Narrative Filmmaker Grant
- Atlanta Film Festival — Grand Jury Prize
