= MondoHomo =

Alternative queer music and arts festival

MondoHomo Dirty South is an alternative queer music & arts festival that debuted in Atlanta in June 2007, during the first U.S. Social Forum. MondoHomo was the love child of Kiki Carr, Ria Pell and Nikki Chotas, and was inspired by Olympia, Washington's Homo-a-Gogo Festival.

MondoHomo Dirty South 2008 took place over Memorial Day weekend in Atlanta. It was the biggest showcase of HomoHop in the South, and one of the significant showcases in the U.S., along with Oakland's PeaceOut festival.

In addition to HomoHop, MondoHomo featured 5 days of radical queer punk, rock, DJs, spoken word, drag, burlesque, visual art, games and workshops. MondoHomo foregrounded queer radical politics in the South, and embodied DIY politics and culture.

The last MondoHomo festival took place in 2012.
