= Sawtooth (film) =

2004 film directed by Andreas Kidess

- Directed by: Andreas Kidess
- Written by: Heather Rae
- Produced by: Victor Buhler; Jean-Michel Dissard; Bonnie Strauss
- Starring: Adam Beach; Rodney Eastman; Russell Friedenberg; Gary Farmer; Udo Kier; Mark Boone Junior; Abby Brammell
- Cinematography: Tobias Datum
- Edited by: Richard Nord
- Release date: 2004
- Country: United States
- Language: English

Sawtooth (also known as Gargoyle) is a 2004 American thriller and drama film directed by Andreas Kidess.This film has music composed by Marc Anthony Thompson.The film starring Andre Blandon, Millie Grant, John Hopson, Shawn Johnson, and Sara McCullah in the lead roles.

== Cast ==
- Adam Beach
- Rodney Eastman
- Russell Friedenberg
- Gary Farmer
- Udo Kier
- Mark Boone Junior
- Abby Brammell
