= Polybus (Odyssey) =

Minor character in Greek epic/myth

In Ancient Greek epic tradition recounted in Homer's Odyssey, Polybus (/ˈpɒlɪbəs/; Ancient Greek: Πόλυβος) was the father of a suitor, Eurymachus, who was killed by Odysseus once he returned from his 10-year journey following the Trojan War.

== Mythology ==
Polybus was described as wise, contradictory to his foolish son.
