= Film Fatales =

Film Fatales is a non-profit which advocates for parity in the entertainment industry and supports a community of women feature film directors who meet regularly to mentor each other, collaborate on projects and share resources.

== History ==
The group was founded in 2013 by Leah Meyerhoff in New York City.

Prior to the 2018 Tribeca Film Festival, Film Fatales announced two events, including a luncheon with WGA East and The Writer's Lab along with several other organizations. It was also revealed that 10 of its members would have their films featured at the festival.

== Membership ==
Since its founding, Film Fatales has expanded to include over one thousand women directors around the world.
