= Natalia Dyer =

American actress (born 1995)

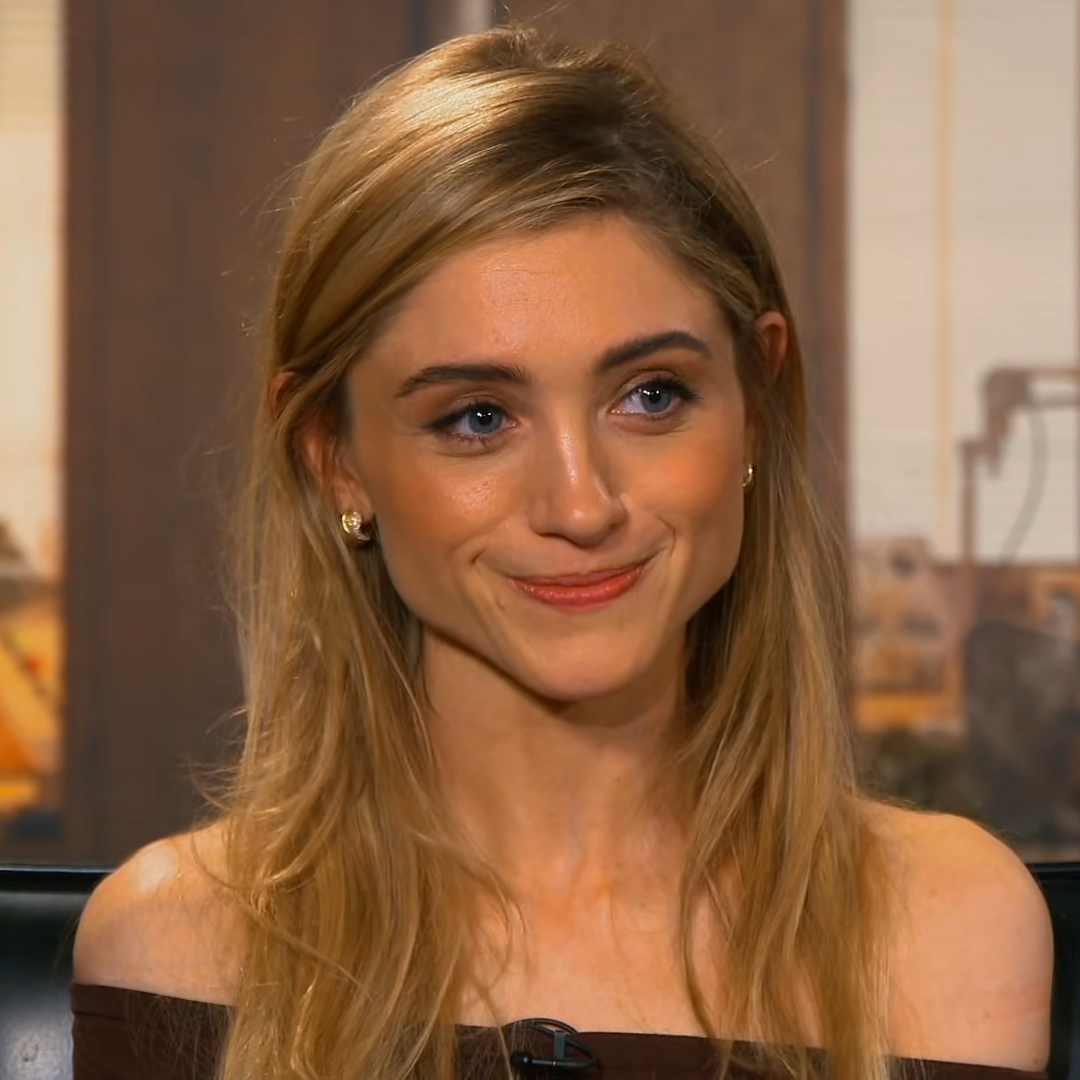
- Dyer in 2025
- Born: Natalia Danielle Dyer; January 13, 1995 (age 31); Nashville, Tennessee, US
- Occupation: Actress
- Years active: 2004–present
- Partner: Charlie Heaton (2016–present)

Natalia Danielle Dyer (born January 13, 1995) is an American actress. She is best known for her role as Nancy Wheeler in the Netflix science fiction horror series Stranger Things (2016–2025). She has also appeared in the Peacock comedy thriller series Based on a True Story (2023) and the films Yes, God, Yes (2019), Velvet Buzzsaw (2019), and Things Heard & Seen (2021).

== Early life ==
Natalia Danielle Dyer was born in Nashville, Tennessee, on January 13, 1995. (Note: Some sources mistakenly give her birth year as 1997, but this is contradicted by the balance of evidence, including statements by Dyer herself.) She has two sisters and an older brother. She started acting in community theater as a child. She graduated from the Nashville School of the Arts, then moved to New York City and enrolled at New York University, studying at the Gallatin School of Individualized Study.

== Career ==
Dyer began her professional career during her early teenage years, taking part in projects produced in and around her hometown in Tennessee; her first screen role was as Clarissa Granger in Hannah Montana: The Movie (2009). During this time, she had also taken small roles in the films The Greening of Whitney Brown and Blue Like Jazz before starring in the small independent films Don't Let Me Go and After Darkness; both films were released the following years. At age 16, she starred in I Believe in Unicorns, which was her first major role. The film premiered three years later at the 2014 SXSW Film Festival. Dyer's breakthrough role was as Nancy Wheeler in the Netflix series Stranger Things. Dyer has also starred in independent films, most notably the dramedy film Yes, God, Yes (2019) in which she stars as Alice, a Catholic school girl exploring sexuality. Among her more notable credits are supporting roles in the horror films Velvet Buzzsaw (2019) and Things Heard & Seen (2021). She starred in the 2023 horror film All Fun and Games opposite Asa Butterfield.

== Personal life ==
Since 2016, Dyer has been in a relationship with her Stranger Things co-star Charlie Heaton.

== Filmography ==
Key
†	Denotes works that have not yet been released

=== Film ===
Year	Title	Role	Notes
2009	Hannah Montana: The Movie	Clarissa Granger	
2010	Too Sunny for Santa	Janie	Short film
2011	The Greening of Whitney Brown	Lily	
2012	Blue Like Jazz	Grace	
2013	Don't Let Me Go	Banshee	
2014	After Darkness	Clara Beaty	
2014	I Believe in Unicorns	Davina	
2014	The City at Night	Adeline	Short film
2015	Till Dark	Lucy	Short film
2016	Long Nights Short Mornings	Marie	
2017	Yes, God, Yes	Alice	Short film
2018	Mountain Rest	Clara	
2018	After Her	Hailey	Short film
2019	Velvet Buzzsaw	Coco	
2019	Yes, God, Yes	Alice	
2019	The Nearest Human Being	Monique	
2019	Tuscaloosa	Virginia	
2021	United States vs. Reality Winner	Reality Winner (voice)	
2021	Things Heard & Seen	Willis Howell	
2023	Chestnut	Annie	
2023	All Fun and Games	Billie Fletcher	
TBA	Goodbye Girl †	TBA	

=== Television ===
Year	Title	Role	Notes
2016–2025	Stranger Things	Nancy Wheeler	Main role
2023	Based on a True Story	Chloe Lake	Main role (season 1)

=== Web ===
Year	Title	Role	Notes
2017	The Postman's Dreams 2	Herself	Episode: "The Elevator"
2020	Acting for a Cause	Jane Eyre	Episode: "Jane Eyre"

=== Music videos ===
Year	Title	Artist	Ref.
2018	"Wild Love"	James Bay	

=== Video games ===
Year	Title	Role	Notes	Ref(s)
2019; 2026	Dead by Daylight	Nancy Wheeler	Likeness	

== Theater ==
Selected credits

Year	Title	Role	Venue	Ref.
2004	To Kill a Mockingbird	Scout	Tennessee Performing Arts Center	
2009	Titanic	Stewardess / Third Class Passenger	Looby Theater	
2016	The Intriguing Engagements of Frances and Meg Cheatham, Ladies Of Society	Meg	Teatro La Tea (FringeNYC)	

== Awards and nominations ==
Year	Award	Category	Nominated work	Result	Ref.
2017	Young Artist Awards	Best Performance in a Digital TV Series or Film — Teen Actress	Stranger Things	Nominated	
2017	Screen Actors Guild Awards	Outstanding Performance by an Ensemble in a Drama Series	Stranger Things	Won	
2018	Screen Actors Guild Awards	Outstanding Performance by an Ensemble in a Drama Series	Stranger Things	Nominated	
2020	Screen Actors Guild Awards	Outstanding Performance by an Ensemble in a Drama Series	Stranger Things	Nominated	
