= Fylmz Festival =

Independent film festival in Nashville, Tennessee

The Fylmz Festival was an independent film festival in Nashville, Tennessee, offering distribution and a $100,000 prize for Best Feature Film. A $3,500 prize for Best Short Film was also awarded. The last festival was in 2007.
