= List of accolades received by Boys Don't Cry (film) =

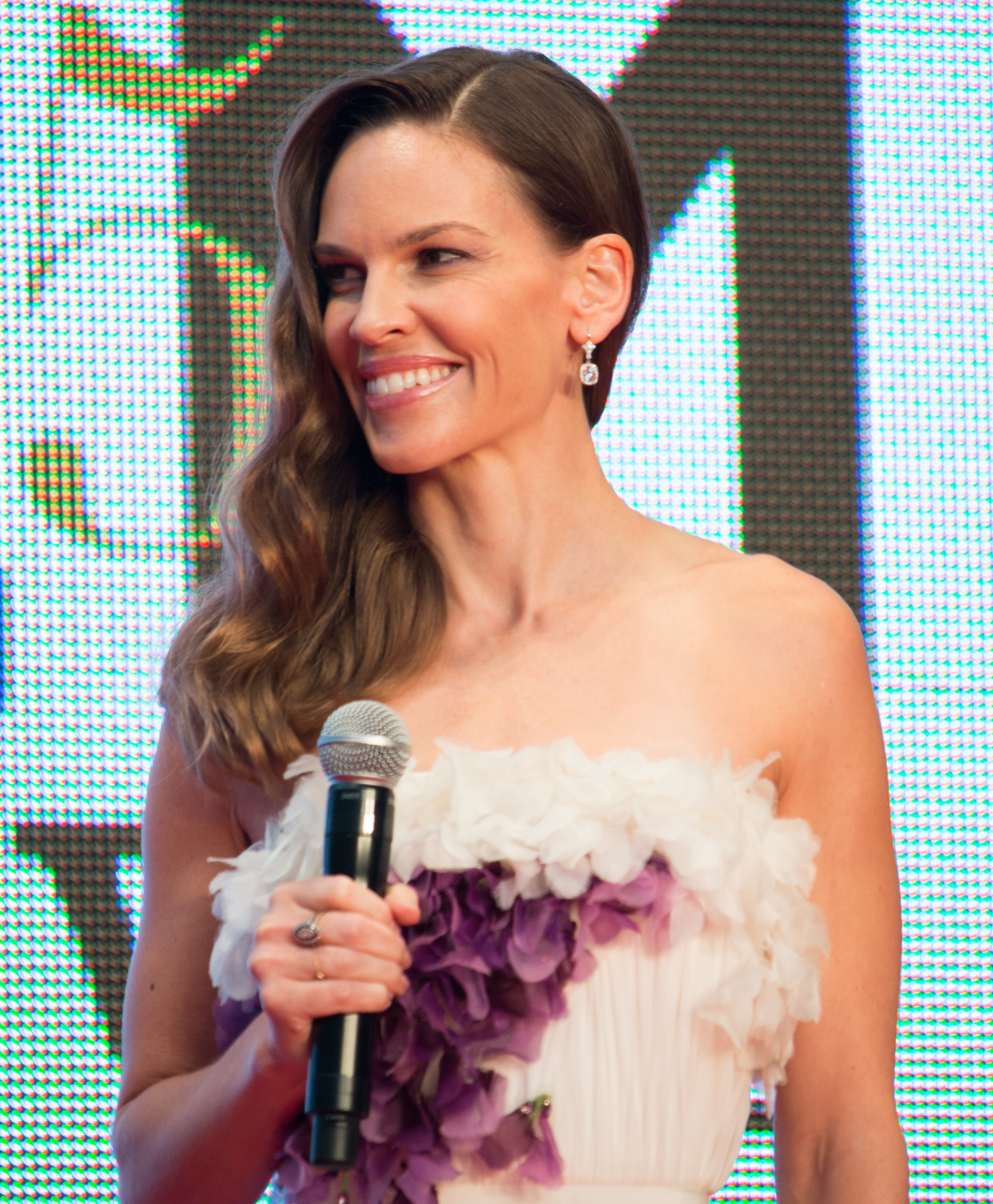
- Hilary Swank received several awards and nominations for her performance in the film.
Accolades
Award	Won	Nominated
Academy Awards	1	2
British Academy Film Awards	0	1
Boston Society of Film Critics	3	3
Critics' Choice Movie Award	1	1
Chicago Film Critics Association	2	2
Chicago International Film Festival	1	1
Dallas-Fort Worth Film Critics Association	1	1
Empire Awards	0	1
European Film Awards	0	1
Florida Film Critics Circle	1	1
GLAAD Media Awards	1	1
Gijón International Film Festival	1	2
Golden Globe Awards	1	2
Guldbagge Awards	0	1
Independent Spirit Awards	2	5
London Film Festival	2	2
Los Angeles Film Critics Association	2	2
MTV Movie Awards	0	2
National Board of Review	3	3
National Society of Film Critics	1	2
New York Film Critics Circle	1	3
Online Film Critics Society	0	2
Political Film Society	1	2
Satellite Awards	2	4
Screen Actors Guild Awards	0	2
St. Louis International Film Festival	1	1
Stockholm International Film Festival	3	4
Teen Choice Awards	0	1
Toronto Film Critics Association	1	1
Young Hollywood Awards	2	2
- Total number of awards and nominations
Totals	37	57
- Footnotes

Boys Don't Cry is a 1999 independent romantic drama film directed by Kimberly Peirce and co-written by Peirce and Andy Bienan. The film is based on the life of Brandon Teena, a trans man who was beaten, raped, and murdered in 1993 after his male acquaintances found out that he was transgender. Hilary Swank stars as Teena and Chloë Sevigny plays his girlfriend Lana Tisdel. Peter Sarsgaard and Brendan Sexton III portray Teena's two murderers. The film premiered at the Venice International Film Festival on September 2, 1999. Fox Searchlight Pictures gave the film a limited release on October 22, 1999. Boys Don't Cry grossed over $11 million at the box office in North America. The film was critically acclaimed, particularly for Swank's acting, with reviewer Michael Sragow, calling the film a "critical knockout". Rotten Tomatoes, a review aggregator, surveyed 76 reviews and judged 88% of them to be positive.

Boys Don't Cry garnered awards and nominations in a variety of categories with particular praise for Swank's performance as Teena, its screenplay and its direction. At the 72nd Academy Awards, Swank won for Best Actress, while Sevigny was nominated for Best Supporting Actress; Swank won for Best Actress – Drama, while Sevigny was nominated for the Best Supporting Actress – Motion Picture awards at the 57th Golden Globe Awards. Swank was also nominated for Best Actress in a Leading Role at the 53rd British Academy Film Awards. At the 4th Golden Satellite Awards, both Swank and Sevigny won their respective categories, and the film was nominated for two additional awards—Best Director and Best Film.

Peirce was recognized at several awards ceremonies for her direction of the film as well as her work co-authorship of the screenplay with Andy Bienen. She won the Best New Filmmaker award from the Boston Society of Film Critics, the FIPRESCI and Satyajit Ray Awards at the London Film Festival, the National Board of Review award for Best Directorial Debut, Best Director and Screenwriter at the Young Hollywood Awards, the FIPRESCI and Best Screenplay awards at the Stockholm International Film Festival, and the Audience Choice Award at the St. Louis International Film Festival. In addition, Peirce was further nominated for a European Film Award, the Grand Prix Asturias at the Gijón International Film Festival, the Best First Feature and Best First Screenplay awards at the Independent Spirit Awards.

== Accolades ==
Award	Date of ceremony	Category	Recipient(s)	Result	Ref.
Academy Awards	March 26, 2000	Best Actress	Hilary Swank	Won	
Academy Awards	March 26, 2000	Best Supporting Actress	Chloë Sevigny	Nominated	
British Academy Film Awards	February 25, 2001	Best Actress in a Leading Role	Hilary Swank	Nominated	
Boston Society of Film Critics	December 12, 1999	Best Actress	Hilary Swank	Won	
Boston Society of Film Critics	December 12, 1999	Best Supporting Actress	Chloë Sevigny	Won	
Boston Society of Film Critics	December 12, 1999	Best New Filmmaker	Kimberly Peirce	Won	
Critics' Choice Awards	January 24, 2000	Best Actress	Hilary Swank	Won	
Chicago Film Critics Association	March 13, 2000	Best Actress	Hilary Swank	Won	
Chicago Film Critics Association	March 13, 2000	Best Supporting Actress	Chloë Sevigny	Won	
Chicago International Film Festival	October 21, 1999	Silver Hugo Award for Best Actress	Hilary Swank	Won	
Dallas–Fort Worth Film Critics Association	January 5, 2000	Best Actress	Hilary Swank	Won	
Empire Awards	February 19, 2001	Best Actress	Hilary Swank	Nominated	
European Film Awards	December 4, 1999	Screen International Award	Kimberly Peirce	Nominated	
Florida Film Critics Circle	January 9, 2000	Best Actress	Hilary Swank	Won	
GLAAD Media Awards	April 2, 2000	Outstanding Film – Limited Release	Boys Don't Cry	Won	
Gijón International Film Festival	August 9, 2000	Grand Prix Asturias	Kimberly Peirce	Nominated	
Golden Globe Awards	January 23, 2000	Best Actress in a Motion Picture – Drama	Hilary Swank	Won	
Golden Globe Awards	January 23, 2000	Best Supporting Actress – Motion Picture	Chloë Sevigny	Nominated	
Guldbagge Awards	February 7, 2000	Best Foreign Language Film	Boys Don't Cry	Nominated	
Independent Spirit Awards	March 25, 2000	Best Female Lead	Hilary Swank	Won	
Independent Spirit Awards	March 25, 2000	Best Supporting Female	Chloë Sevigny	Won	
Independent Spirit Awards	March 25, 2000	Best First Feature	Kimberly Peirce, Jeffrey Sharp, John Hart, Eva Kolodner, and Christine Vachon	Nominated	
Independent Spirit Awards	March 25, 2000	Best First Screenplay	Kimberly Peirce and Andy Bienen	Nominated	
Independent Spirit Awards	March 25, 2000	Producers Award	Eva Kolodner	Nominated	
BFI London Film Festival	March 8, 2000	FIPRESCI Prize	Kimberly Peirce	Won	
BFI London Film Festival	March 8, 2000	Satyajit Ray Award	Kimberly Peirce	Won	
Los Angeles Film Critics Association	December 11, 1999	Best Actress	Hilary Swank	Won	
Los Angeles Film Critics Association	December 11, 1999	Los Angeles Film Critics Association Award for Best Supporting Actress	Chloë Sevigny	Won	
MTV Movie Awards	June 3, 2000	Best Breakthrough Performance – Female	Hilary Swank	Nominated	
MTV Movie Awards	June 3, 2000	Best Kiss	Hilary Swank & Chloë Sevigny	Nominated	
National Board of Review	January 18, 2000	Breakthrough Performance – Female	Hilary Swank	Won	
National Board of Review	January 18, 2000	Outstanding Directorial Debut	Kimberly Peirce	Won	
National Board of Review	January 18, 2000	Top Ten Films	Boys Don't Cry	Won	
National Society of Film Critics	January 8, 2000	Best Actress	Hilary Swank	2nd Place	
National Society of Film Critics	January 8, 2000	Best Supporting Actress	Chloë Sevigny	Won	
New York Film Critics Circle	December 16, 1999	Best Actress	Hilary Swank	Won	
New York Film Critics Circle	December 16, 1999	Best Supporting Actress	Chloë Sevigny	2nd Place	
New York Film Critics Circle	December 16, 1999	Best First Film	Kimberly Peirce	2nd Place	
Online Film Critics Society	January 2, 2000	Best Actress	Hilary Swank	Nominated	
Online Film Critics Society	January 2, 2000	Best Supporting Actress	Chloë Sevigny	Nominated	
Political Film Society	January 1, 2000	Exposé	Boys Don't Cry	Won	
Political Film Society	January 1, 2000	Human Rights	Boys Don't Cry	Nominated	
Golden Satellite Awards	January 16, 2000	Best Film – Drama	Boys Don't Cry	Nominated	
Golden Satellite Awards	January 16, 2000	Best Director	Kimberly Peirce	Nominated	
Golden Satellite Awards	January 16, 2000	Best Actress – Motion Picture Drama	Hilary Swank	Won	
Golden Satellite Awards	January 16, 2000	Best Supporting Actress – Motion Picture Drama	Chloë Sevigny	Won	
Screen Actors Guild Awards	March 12, 2000	Outstanding Performance by a Female Actor in a Leading Role	Hilary Swank	Nominated	
Screen Actors Guild Awards	March 12, 2000	Outstanding Performance by a Female Actor in a Supporting Role	Chloë Sevigny	Nominated	
St. Louis International Film Festival	November 16, 1999	Emerson Audience Award	Boys Don't Cry	Won	
Stockholm International Film Festival	November 21, 1999	Audience Award	Boys Don't Cry	Won	
Stockholm International Film Festival	November 21, 1999	FIPRESCI Prize	Kimberly Peirce	Won	
Stockholm International Film Festival	November 21, 1999	Bronze Horse	Kimberly Peirce	Nominated	
Stockholm International Film Festival	November 21, 1999	Best Screenplay	Kimberly Peirce and Andy Bienen	Won	
Teen Choice Awards	August 6, 2000	Choice Breakout Performance	Hilary Swank	Nominated	
Toronto Film Critics Association	December 16, 1999	Best Actress	Hilary Swank	Won	
Young Hollywood Awards	June 1, 2000	Best Director	Kimberly Peirce	Won	
Young Hollywood Awards	June 1, 2000	Best Screenwriter	Kimberly Peirce and Andy Bienen	Won	

== See also ==
- 1999 in film
