= 15th Independent Spirit Awards =

US film awards ceremony in 2000

- Date: March 25, 2000
- Site: Santa Monica, California, U.S.
- Hosted by: Jennifer Tilly

Highlights
- Best Film: Election
- Most awards: Election (3)
- Most nominations: Boys Don't Cry(5); The Limey (5)

The 15th Independent Spirit Awards, honoring the best in independent filmmaking for 1999, were announced on March 25, 2000. It was hosted by Jennifer Tilly.

== Nominees and winners ==
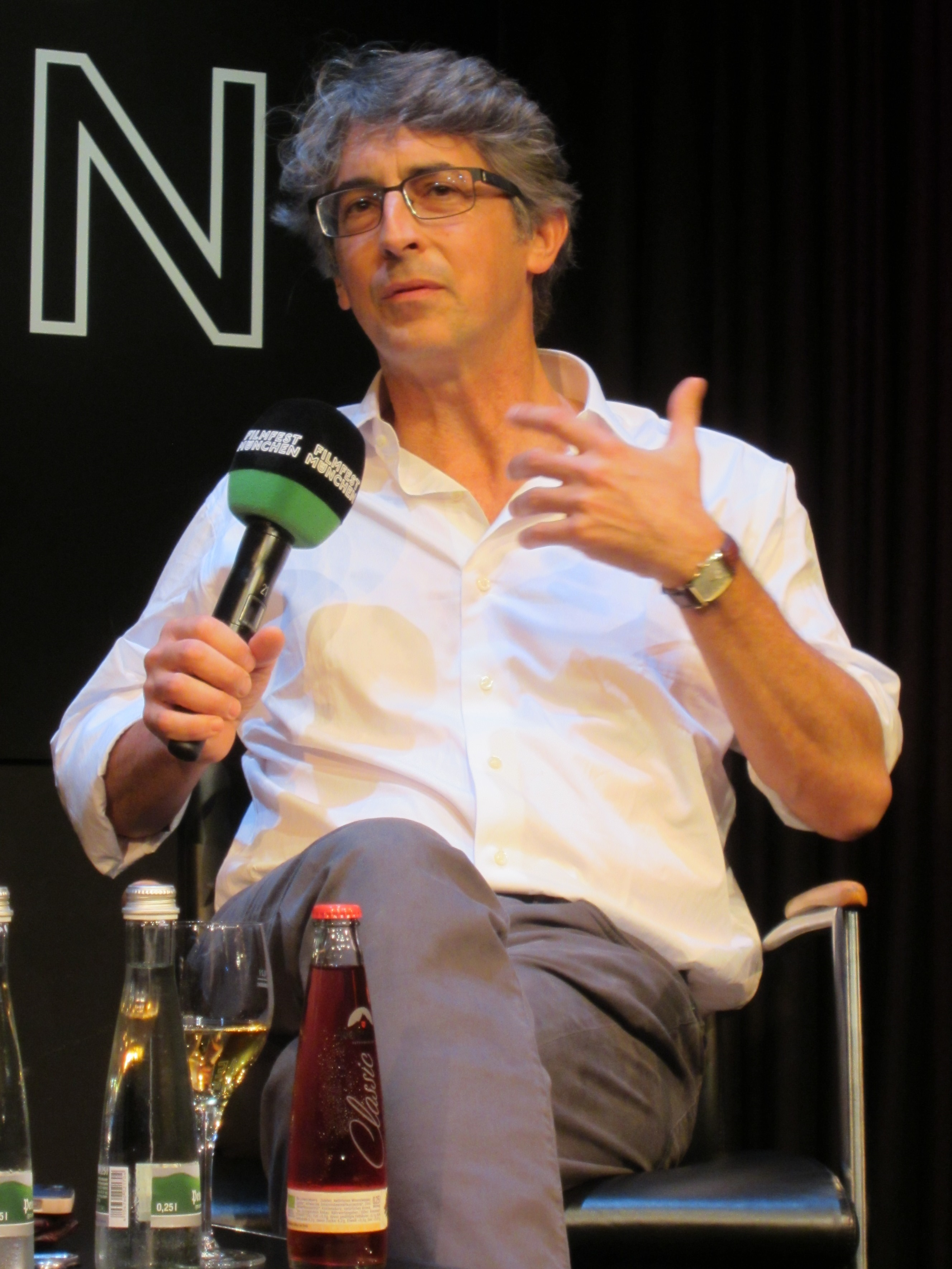
Alexander Payne, winner of Best Director and co-winner of Best Screenplay

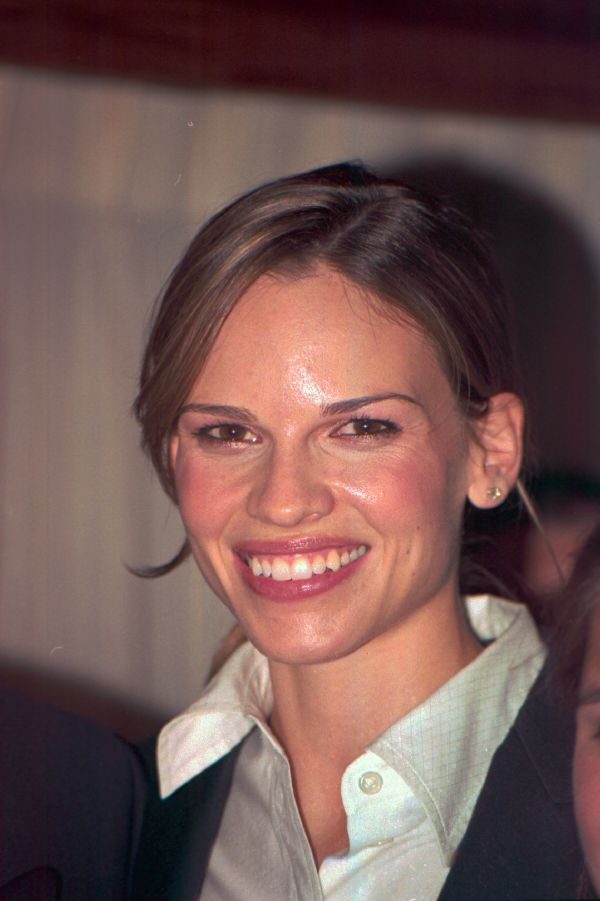
Hilary Swank, winner of Best Female Lead

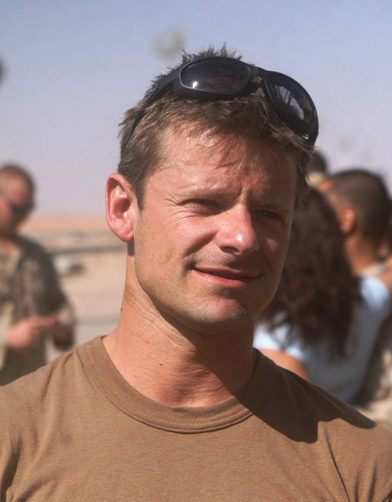
Steve Zahn, winner of Best Supporting Male

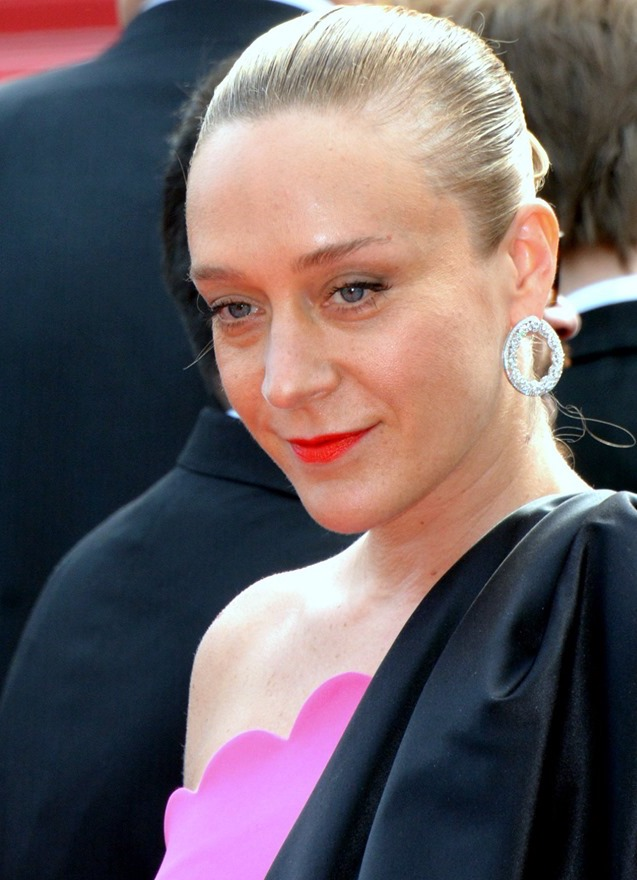
Chloë Sevigny, winner of Best Supporting Female

Best Feature	Best Director
Election: Cookie's Fortune; The Limey; The Straight Story; Sugar Town	Alexander Payne – Election: Harmony Korine – Julien Donkey-Boy; Doug Liman – Go; David Lynch – The Straight Story; Steven Soderbergh – The Limey
Best Male Lead	Best Female Lead
Richard Farnsworth – The Straight Story: John Cusack – Being John Malkovich; Terence Stamp – The Limey; David Strathairn – Limbo; Noble Willingham – The Corndog Man	Hilary Swank – Boys Don't Cry: Diane Lane – A Walk on the Moon; Janet McTeer – Tumbleweeds; Susan Traylor – Valerie Flake; Reese Witherspoon – Election
Best Supporting Male	Best Supporting Female
Steve Zahn – Happy, Texas: Charles S. Dutton – Cookie's Fortune; Clark Gregg – The Adventures of Sebastian Cole; Luis Guzmán – The Limey; Terrence Howard – The Best Man	Chloë Sevigny – Boys Don't Cry: Barbara Barrie – Judy Berlin; Vanessa Martinez – Limbo; Sarah Polley – Go; Jean Smart – Guinevere
Best Screenplay	Best First Screenplay
Election – Alexander Payne and Jim Taylor: Dogma – Kevin Smith; Guinevere – Audrey Wells; The Limey – Lem Dobbs; SLC Punk! – James Merendino	Being John Malkovich – Charlie Kaufman: The Adventures of Sebastian Cole – Kip Williams; Boys Don't Cry – Kimberly Peirce and Andy Bienen; Cookie's Fortune – Anne Rapp; The Straight Story – John Roach and Mary Sweeney
Best Cinematography	Best Debut Performance
Three Seasons – Lisa Rinzler: The City – Harlan Bosmajian; Judy Berlin – Jeffrey Seckendorf; Julien Donkey-Boy – Anthony Dod Mantle; Twin Falls Idaho – M. David Mullen	Kimberly J. Brown – Tumbleweeds: Jessica Campbell – Election; Jade Gordon – Sugar Town; Toby Smith – Drylongso; Chris Stafford – Edge of Seventeen
Best First Feature (Over $500,000)	Best First Feature (Under $500,000)
Being John Malkovich: Boys Don't Cry; Three Seasons; Twin Falls Idaho; Xiu Xiu: The Sent Down Girl	The Blair Witch Project: The City; Compensation; Judy Berlin; Treasure Island
Best Foreign Film
Run Lola Run • Germany: All About My Mother • Spain; My Son the Fanatic • UK; Rosetta • Belgium/France; Topsy-Turvy • UK

== Special awards ==
=== Truer Than Fiction Award ===
Night Waltz: The Music of Paul Bowles

- American Hollow
- On the Ropes
- Well-Founded Fear

=== Producers Award ===
Pamela Koffler – I'm Losing You

- Eva Kolodner – Boys Don't Cry
- Paul Mezey – The City
- Christine K. Walker – Backroads and Homo Heights

=== Someone to Watch Award ===
Cauleen Smith – Drylongso

- Dan Clark – The Item
- Julian Goldberger – Trans
- Lisanne Skyler – Getting to Know You

=== Films with multiple nominations and awards ===
==== Films that received multiple nominations ====
Nominations	Film
5	Boys Don't Cry
5	The Limey
4	Election
4	The Straight Story
3	Being John Malkovich
3	Cookie's Fortune
3	Judy Berlin

==== Films that won multiple awards ====
Awards	Film
3	Election
2	Being John Malkovich
2	Boys Don't Cry
