= East of the Mountains (novel) =

1999 novel by David Guterson

- Author: David Guterson
- Language: English
- Genre: Philosophical / Tragedy
- Publisher: Bloomsbury
- Publication date: 1999
- Media type: Paperback
- Pages: 288
- ISBN: 978-0-7475-4508-8

East of the Mountains is a novel by American author David Guterson, first published in 1999, and in paperback in 2000. His second full novel, it marks something of a change of pace from the taut courtroom drama of Snow Falling on Cedars (1994), being primarily focused on the chance actions and introspective musings of its protagonist over the course of a few days.

== Synopsis ==
Dr. Ben Givens is a 73-year-old retired cardiothoracic surgeon and a widower, recently diagnosed with terminal colon cancer. Still haunted by his experiences as a soldier in the war, and in mourning for Rachel, his late wife of some 50 years, Dr. Givens's current life consists primarily of his family (a daughter and grandson), and occasional hunting trips. Although he hunted as a boy with his father and brother, he abandoned it after the war, only taking it up again upon Rachel's death (he still uses his father's old Winchester shotgun). Aware that he is nearing the end of his life, he decides to set off from his home in Seattle for one last hunting trip, along with his two Brittany hunting dogs, Tristan and Rex, heading east across the mountains of Washington state back towards the orchard areas where he was born. His family does not, however, know of his cancer, and his intention during the trip is to commit suicide, shooting himself with his father's gun, staging it to look like an unfortunate accident which occurred whilst he was climbing over a fence, thus saving both himself and his family from the pain of a long, drawn-out death from cancer.

En route, however, Dr. Givens accidentally crashes his car, and although his only real injury is a swollen black eye, he is left without his planned mode of transportation. Deciding to continue with his trip, he is forced to make his way east by alternative means. Through a combination of hitchhiking, a long walk through the desert, a lift bought from a lorry driver, a Greyhound bus, and a rental car, he finally approaches his destination, but will the combined effect of the people he has met, the experiences he has undergone, the gains he has made, and the losses he has sustained during this journey be enough to make him give up his climactic plan?

== Themes ==
The overarching theme of the novel is evidently the cycle of life and death, the interplay between the two, and the choice the individual can make to embrace one or the other. This is of course primarily highlighted in the main story of Ben's intent to commit suicide; although death is inevitable (as his cancer makes clear), Ben is still faced with the question as to whether life is precious enough to be worth maintaining for as long as possible, or whether a quick death to avoid the inevitable hardships of life is preferable.

In the first, the life element of Ben's birth and childhood in an orchard environment (i.e. a place of new life) is contrasted with the death of his mother, and the killings performed by his Father whilst hunting. Similarly, in the second flashback (set during the war), the choice of Ben's wife-to-be Rachel to become a nurse contrasts with Ben's choice to enter the war as an active soldier. It is significant that the flashbacks culminate with Ben's horror of killing a man in battle, and his admiration for the surgeon who saves his friend - an event which leads to his decision to follow Rachel's advice and become a doctor.

As the flashbacks demonstrate, Rachel (and before her his mother) represent the force of life for Ben: it is only after Rachel's death that he returns to hunting. During his journey, he meets several people with an optimistically positive outlook on life, and once again learns to appreciate its value. This is demonstrated by the lengths he goes to save his dog Rex, to provide medical care for an undocumented Mexican immigrant, and finally to safely deliver a baby in an orchard (returning to the life affirmation which marked his own genesis). These steps he takes to save and preserve the lives of others will eventually lead him to a more positive realisation of the value of his own life.

On the opposite side, the choice of death could perhaps be represented by the figure of William Harden - a somewhat sadistic hunter who takes Ben's gun after a fatal scuffle between their dogs. Harden arguably represents the extreme of what Ben, as a hunter, could become. Notably, the contempt in which Harden as a hunter, a figure of death, is held by those around him (including his own family) contrasts sharply with the esteem in which those same people hold Ben as a doctor, a figure of life. Ultimately, Ben chooses life, symbolised by his telling Harden that he can keep the gun:

"'My call is this,' said Ben. 'That gun was in my family sixty years. My father used it before I did, hunting birds. He killed a lot of birds with it. After him, I killed my share, too. But you know something about that gun? It was never anything but bad, really. A bad thing, that gun.
'Harden didn't answer. He wiped his mouth instead.
'That gun is cursed,' Ben said. 'All guns are cursed.'"

== Adaptations ==
In April 2021, East of the Mountains, a film directed by SJ Chiro, debuted at the Seattle International Film Festival and appeared in theaters in September 2021.
