= Snow Falling on Cedars (film) =

1999 American legal drama film by Scott Hicks

- Theatrical release poster
- Directed by: Scott Hicks
- Screenplay by: Ron Bass; Scott Hicks
- Based on: Snow Falling on Cedars by David Guterson
- Produced by: Ron Bass; Kathleen Kennedy; Frank Marshall; Harry J. Ufland
- Starring: Ethan Hawke; James Cromwell; Max von Sydow; Youki Kudoh; Rick Yune; James Rebhorn; Sam Shepard; Richard Jenkins
- Cinematography: Robert Richardson
- Edited by: Hank Corwin
- Music by: James Newton Howard
- Production company: Kennedy/Marshall
- Distributed by: Universal Pictures
- Release dates: September 12, 1999 (TIFF); December 22, 1999
- Running time: 127 minutes
- Country: United States
- Languages: English; Japanese
- Budget: $35 million
- Box office: $23,049,593

Snow Falling on Cedars is a 1999 American legal drama film directed by Scott Hicks, and starring Ethan Hawke, James Cromwell, Max von Sydow, Youki Kudoh, Rick Yune, Richard Jenkins, James Rebhorn, and Sam Shepard. It is based on David Guterson's PEN/Faulkner Award-winning novel of the same name, with a screenplay by Hicks and Ron Bass.

The film received mixed reviews. It was nominated for an Academy Award for Best Cinematography, and five Satellite Awards, including Best Motion Picture Drama.

== Plot ==
Set on the fictional San Piedro Island in the northern Puget Sound region of the Washington state coast in 1950, the plot revolves around the murder case of Kazuo Miyamoto, a Japanese American accused of killing Carl Heine, a white fisherman. The trial occurs in the midst of deep anti-Japanese sentiments following World War II. Covering the case is the editor of the town's one-man newspaper, Ishmael Chambers, a World War II veteran who lost an arm fighting the Japanese in the Pacific War. Ishmael struggles with his childhood, and continuing, love for Kazuo's wife, Hatsue, and his conscience, wondering if Kazuo is truly innocent.

Spearheading the prosecution are the town's sheriff, Art Moran, and prosecutor, Alvin Hooks. Leading the defense is the old, experienced attorney Nels Gudmundsson. An underlying theme throughout the trial is prejudice. Several witnesses, including Carl's mother, Etta, accuse Kazuo of murdering Carl for racial and personal reasons. This stance is not without irony, as Kazuo, a decorated war veteran of the 442nd Regimental Combat Team, experienced prejudice because of his ancestry following the Japanese attack on Pearl Harbor. By the same standard, Etta, a German American, could be blamed for Nazi war crimes.

Also involved in the trial is Ole Jurgensen, an elderly man who sold his strawberry field to Carl. The strawberry field was a contested issue during the trial. The land was originally owned by Carl Heine Sr. The Miyamotos lived in a house on the Heines' land and picked strawberries for Carl Sr. Kazuo, and Carl Jr. were close friends as children. Kazuo's father, Zenhichi, eventually approached Carl Sr. about purchasing 7 acres (28,000 m^{2}) of the farm. Though Etta opposed the sale, Carl Sr. agreed. The payments were to be made over a ten-year period. However, before the last payment was made, war erupted between the U.S. and Japan, and all islanders of Japanese ancestry were forced to relocate to internment camps. In 1944, Carl Sr. died and Etta sold the land to Ole. When Kazuo returned after the war, he was extremely bitter toward Etta for reneging on the land sale. When Ole suffered a stroke and decided to sell the farm, he was approached by Carl Jr., hours before Kazuo arrived, to try to buy the land back. During the trial, the land is presented as a family feud and the motivation behind Carl's murder.

Ishmael's search of the maritime records reveals that on the night that Carl Heine died a freighter passed through the channel where Carl had been fishing at 1:42am, five minutes before his watch had stopped. Ishmael realizes that Carl was thrown overboard by the force of the freighter's wake. Despite the bitterness he feels at Hatsue's rejection, Ishmael comes forward with the new information. Further evidence is collected in support of the conclusion that Carl had climbed the boat's mast to cut down a lantern, been knocked from the mast by the freighter's wake, hit his head on his boat's gunwale, then fallen into the sea. The charges against Kazuo are dismissed. Hatsue thanks Ishmael by allowing him to hold her "one last time."

== Cast ==
- Ethan Hawke as Ishmael Chambers
  - Reeve Carney as young Ishmael
- James Cromwell as Judge Fielding
- Max von Sydow as Nels Gudmundsson
- Youki Kudoh as Hatsue Miyamoto
  - Anne Suzuki as young Hatsue
- Richard Jenkins as Sheriff Art Moran
- James Rebhorn as Alvin Hooks
- Sam Shepard as Arthur Chambers
- Rick Yune as Kabuo Miyamoto
  - Seiji Inouye as young Kabuo
- Celia Weston as Etta Heine
- Cary-Hiroyuki Tagawa as Zenhichi Miyamoto
- Eric Thal as Carl Heine Jr.
- Arija Bareikis as Susan Marie Heine
- Zeljko Ivanek as Dr. Whitman
- Daniel von Bargen as Carl Heine Sr.
- Akira Takayama as Hisao Imada
- Ako as Fujiko Imada
- Zak Orth as Deputy Abel Martinson
- Caroline Kava as Helen Chambers
- Jan Rubeš as Ole Jurgensen
- Sheila Moore as Liesel Jurgensen
- Saemi Nakamura as Sumiko Imada
- Mika Fujii as Yukiko Imada
- Henry O as Nagaishi

== Production ==
Filming took place primarily in locations around British Columbia, Canada and Washington state. Several scenes were filmed in Greenwood, where a lot of the older extras were Japanese-Canadians who were interned during World War II. Though portraying an island town, Greenwood is actually 275 miles from the coast, confusing tourists who read "Harbor" and "Ocean" signs placed there by the production. Scenes of Maine's Portland Head Light were filmed during the ice storm of 1998. The film includes a clip from the documentary Topaz, a home movie shot by Topaz War Relocation Center internee Dave Tatsuno.

The film was the debut performance of Anne Suzuki, who plays the younger Hatsue.

== Reception ==
=== Critical response ===
Snow Falling on Cedars received an approval rating of 39% on the review aggregator Rotten Tomatoes based on 92 reviews, with a weighted average rating of 5.3/10. The site's critical consensus reads, "Though Snow Falling on Cedars is beautiful to look at, critics say the story becomes dull and tedious to sit through." On review aggregator website Metacritic, the film holds a 44 out of 100 based on 31 reviews, indicating "mixed or average" reviews.

Film critic Roger Ebert of the Chicago Sun-Times awarded the film three and a half out of four stars and wrote that "Snow Falling on Cedars is a rich, multilayered film about a high school romance and a murder trial a decade later" and that it "reveals itself with the complexity of a novel, holding its themes up to the light so that first one and then another aspect can be seen."

Kenneth Turan of the Los Angeles Times wrote, "While there are things to like about this film, the poetic realism of [Robert] Richardson’s cinematography and Jeannine Oppewall’s production design high among them, 'Cedars' has to fight to hold our attention and it doesn’t always succeed. That’s because it’s a film without a hero, at least a hero that can function in an acceptable cinematic manner". Turan did praise the film's "extensive and sensitive treatment of Manzanar exile Hatsue and her family...[where] the film’s poetic realism is a strength".

Other criticisms cited the film's two-hour runtime, use of different time frames, and its focus on white characters like Ishmael, Gudmundsson, and Hooks at the expense of the Japanese American character Kazuo. Edward Guthmann of the SF Chronicle wrote, "'Cedars' never brings the viewer inside the Japanese American experience -- even though its primary aim is to strip the facade off anti-Asian bias and make a plea for racial tolerance".

=== Awards and nominations ===
Award	Category	Nominee(s)	Result	Ref.
Academy Awards	Best Cinematography	Robert Richardson	Nominated	
American Society of Cinematographers Awards	Outstanding Achievement in Cinematography in Theatrical Releases	Robert Richardson	Nominated	
British Society of Cinematographers Awards	Best Cinematography in a Theatrical Feature Film	Robert Richardson	Nominated	
Chicago Film Critics Association Awards	Best Cinematography	Robert Richardson	Won	
Dallas–Fort Worth Film Critics Association Awards	Best Cinematography	Robert Richardson	Won	
Florida Film Critics Circle Awards	Best Cinematography	Robert Richardson	Won	
Golden Trailer Awards	The Dark and Stormy Night		Nominated	
Las Vegas Film Critics Society Awards	Best Cinematography	Robert Richardson	Won	
Online Film & Television Association Awards	Best Cinematography	Robert Richardson	Nominated	
Satellite Awards	Best Motion Picture – Drama		Nominated	
Satellite Awards	Best Director	Scott Hicks	Nominated	
Satellite Awards	Best Actress in a Motion Picture – Drama	Youki Kudoh	Nominated	
Satellite Awards	Best Cinematography	Robert Richardson	Nominated	
Satellite Awards	Best Original Score	James Newton Howard	Nominated	
Young Artist Awards	Best Performance in a Feature Film: Supporting Young Actor	Reeve Carney	Won (Note: Tied with Ryan Merriman for The Deep End of the Ocean.)	
YoungStar Awards	Best Young Actress / Performance in a Motion Picture Drama Film:	Anne Suzuki	Nominated	
