= Drylongso (film) =

1998 American film

- Theatrical release poster
- Directed by: Cauleen Smith
- Written by: Cauleen Smith; Salim Akil
- Produced by: Christine Gant; Cauleen Smith
- Starring: Toby Smith; April Barnett; Salim Akil; Will Power; Channel Schafer
- Cinematography: Andrew Black
- Edited by: Cauleen Smith
- Music by: Curt Harbel; Pat Thomi
- Production company: Nation Sack Filmworks Production
- Distributed by: The Asylum; Janus Films
- Release dates: October 17, 1998 (Hamptons International Film Festival); March 29, 1999 (United States)
- Running time: 86 minutes
- Country: United States
- Language: English
- Box office: $15,236

Drylongso is a 1998 American coming-of-age drama film directed by Cauleen Smith, who co-wrote the film with Salim Akil. The film, which was shot on location in Oakland, California on 16-millimeter film, centers on a young black photography student and deals with numerous issues relating to race, gender and identity. The title is derived from the Gullah word for "ordinary."

Drylongso was screened at film festivals around the United States and won multiple awards, including an Independent Spirit Award for Smith and the Grand Jury Prize at the Urbanworld Film Festival.

The film received a restoration and theatrical re-release in March 2023 from Janus Films.

== Plot ==
Pica Sullivan is a young art student who lives with her mother and grandmother in Oakland. She works a nighttime job papering walls, which puts her safety at risk. As an outlet for her dysfunctional home life, she photographs young African American men with the belief they are an "endangered species" who may one day become extinct. Her night job affects her attendance in photography class, which she is also struggling with because she uses a Polaroid for her photos and not the requisite 35 mm camera. One night, Pica meets Tobi, a young woman who is left beaten on a street curb by her abusive boyfriend. Pica learns Tobi disguises herself as a man to protect herself from violence. Pica and Tobi bond over their shared fears for their safety. Pica also becomes enmeshed in news reports of the "Westside Slasher", a serial killer who is claiming victims in the neighborhood, with some of the young men she has photographed being among the victims.

== Cast ==
- Toby Smith as Pica Sullivan
- April Barnett as Tobi
- Will Power as Malik
- Channel Schafer as Gloria Sullivan
- Salim Akil as Mr. Yamada
- Stacy Marbrey as Tiffany
- Keith Williams as Mohamed
- Sayyed Yusuf Bey as Muslim Brother
- Earl Ford as Tide
- Keilan Matthews as Tyson
- Patrick Pulliam as Kev
- Timothy Braggs as Jefferson

== Production ==
In the early 1990s, Cauleen Smith was working at the Haight Asbury Free Clinic and the Glide Memorial Church in San Francisco. She kept hearing about young African American men who were being murdered or going to prison at the same time she was seeing young African American girls who were dealing with teen pregnancy and a bureaucratic welfare system. Smith said, "I was seeing young black girls 8 or 9 years old who really needed someone to care for them. I got tired of seeing young black women being talked about in terms of blame -- teen pregnancy, welfare -- whereas young black men were being talked about as victims in need of defense. Girls are treated with such disrespect. Pica came out of that frustration." Smith’s interest in the marginalized youth inspired her to make a short film, which became the basis for Drylongso. The script was developed over a span of several years.

Production took place over the summer of 1995.

== Release ==
Drylongso premiered at the 1998 Hamptons International Film Festival. It was selected to screen at the 1999 Sundance Film Festival as part of the American Spectrum section. It went on to screen at various film festivals, including the South by Southwest (SXSW) Film Festival in Austin Texas, the Pan-African Film Festival, and the Urbanworld Film Festival. The film was selected as the opening feature at the Film Arts Foundation Film Festival held at the Castro Theatre in San Francisco. In August 1999, the film was shown on The Sundance Channel.

In March 2023, Janus Films gave the film a 4K restoration and a limited theatrical re-release.

== Critical reception ==
Marjorie Baumgarten of The Austin Chronicle wrote, "Cauleen Smith has created a movie that is both enmeshed in the 'same-old, same-old' of urban black culture while simultaneously unearthing unique dimensions and insights. Effective and engaging performances, penetrating subject matter, and a simple but thoughtful shooting style make Drylongso a movie that is truly extraordinary." Oliver Jones of Variety said, "Smith gives an understated performance as Pica, a character who has built walls around her emotions so she can cope with the hardships of life. As Tobi, the gangsta wannabe, Barnett gives the film a badly needed comic element. The two women’s scenes together are the most deeply felt parts of the film."

Writing of the film’s re-release, Lisa Kennedy of The New York Times wrote, "It’s not a mystery why this quiet wonder was lost in the Black cinema boom of the 1990s. The movie is rough-hewn as an artistic choice but also out of financial necessity; its D.I.Y. aesthetic mirrors the found scrap Pica uses to make meaningful memorials. But with its themes of Black endangerment (for both males and females) and its nuzzling of many genres (horror, romance, buddy flick), Drylongso returns to us utterly, subtly, chidingly prescient."

Eileen G’Sell of HyperAllergic wrote, "a decade before the Obama presidency, before Oakland’s dramatic gentrification, and more than two decades before national protests against police brutality reached a fever pitch — Drylongso feels at once bygone and terribly prescient." G’sell also noted that the West Oakland captured by Smith "is decidedly not a hotbed of destitution and despair, but rather home to a close-knit working- and middle-class community — a place of candy-colored houses with echoing staircases, sun-splotched sidewalks, and Black-owned bookstores."

== Awards and nominations ==
- Independent Spirit Awards
  - Someone to Watch Award - Cauleen Smith, winner 1999
  - Best Breakthrough Performance - Toby Smith, nominee 1999
- Hamptons International Film Festival
  - Golden Starfish Award for Best American Independent Film - Cauleen Smith, honorable mention 1998
- SXSW Film Festival
  - Silver Armadillo - winner 1999
- Urbanworld Film Festival
  - Grand Jury Prize for Best Feature - Cauleen Smith, winner 1999

== "In the Wake" ==
A number of props created for the film, including a banner titled "In the Wake" which was created by Smith as part of a procession for the film, were displayed at the Whitney Museum of American Art in New York as part of their 2017 Whitney Biennial.
