= David Guterson =

American novelist (born 1956)

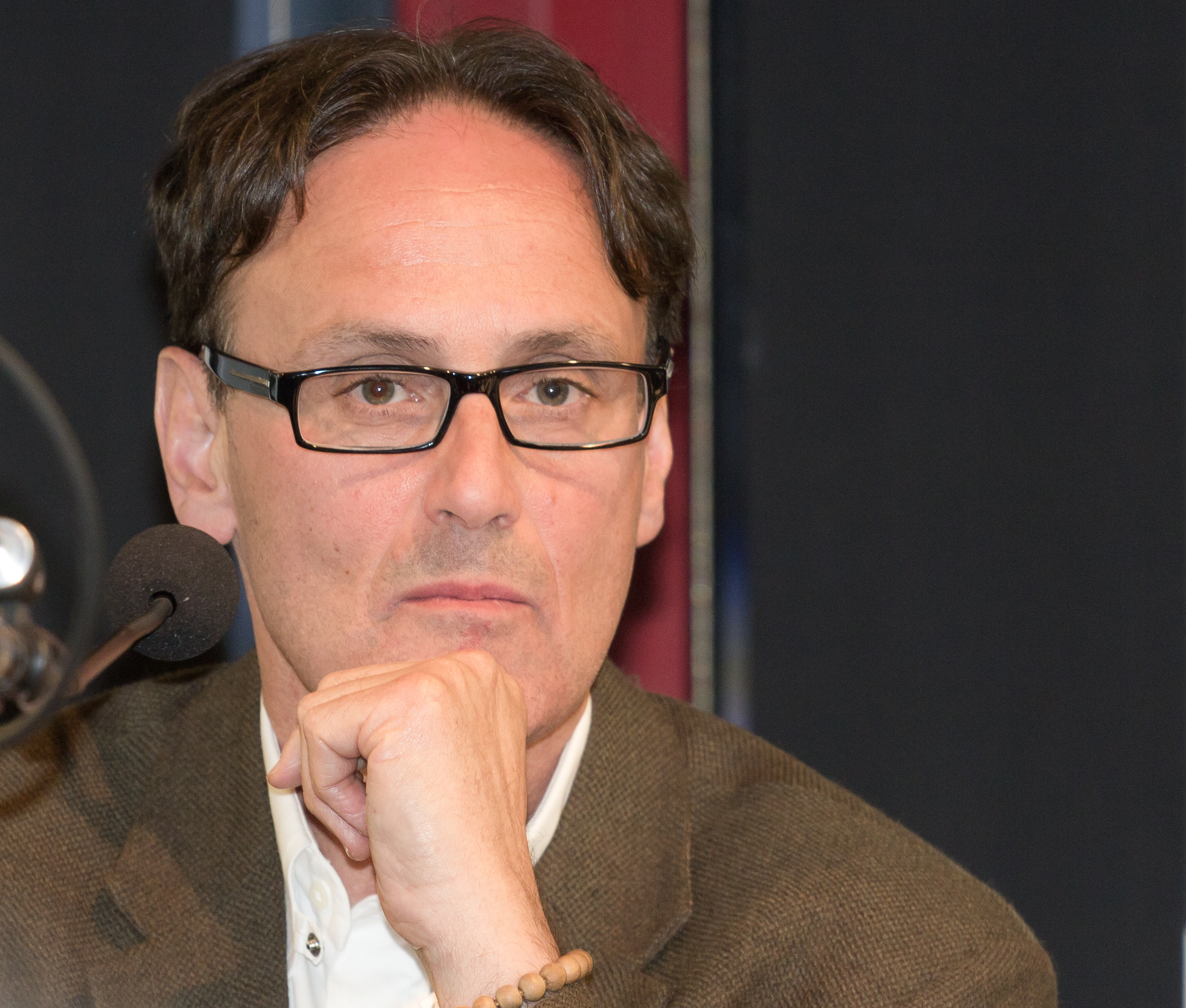
- Guterson in April 2013
- Born: May 4, 1956 (age 70); Seattle, Washington, U.S.
- Education: University of Washington (BA, MFA)
- Occupation: Writer
- Spouse: Robin Guterson
- Children: 5
- Writing career
- Notable work: Snow Falling on Cedars (1994)
- Notable awards: Guggenheim Fellowship; PEN/Faulkner Award for Fiction

David Guterson (/ˈɡʌtərsən/ GUT-ər-sən; born May 4, 1956) is an American novelist, short story writer, poet, journalist, and essayist. He is best known as the author of the bestselling Japanese American internment novel Snow Falling on Cedars (1994).

== Early life ==
Guterson was born May 4, 1956 in Seattle, Washington, the son of criminal defense lawyer Murray Guterson. He attended Seattle Public Schools and Roosevelt High School, then the University of Washington, where he earned a Bachelor of Arts in English literature and a Master of Fine Arts in creative writing. He is also a Guggenheim Fellow.

== Teaching, writing ==
Before writing professionally, Guterson worked as a teacher for 10 years at Bainbridge High School. During that time he began having stories and essays published in small magazines and periodicals, and eventually sold pieces to Esquire, Sports Illustrated and Harper's Magazine. His first book, The Country Ahead of Us, the Country Behind (1989) is a collection of short stories set mostly in the Pacific Northwest. His second book, Family Matters: Why Homeschooling Makes Sense (1992) contains essays on family and education.

Guterson's freelance journalism included articles on environmental issues, travel writing and human interest features.

== Snow Falling on Cedars, subsequent work ==
Guterson is best known as the author of Snow Falling on Cedars (1994), for which he received the 1995 PEN/Faulkner Award. To date, it has sold nearly four million copies and was adapted into the 1999 film of the same title.

His subsequent novels include East of the Mountains (1999), which was adapted into a movie of the same title in 2021, Our Lady of the Forest (2003), The Other (2008) and Ed King (2011).

== Personal life ==
Guterson married his wife Robin when he was 23. They live on Bainbridge Island in Puget Sound and have five children and three grandchildren. He is a co-founder of Field's End, an organization for writers.

== Bibliography ==
- The Country Ahead of Us, the Country Behind: Stories (1989)
- Family Matters: Why Homeschooling Makes Sense (Non-fiction) (1992)
- Snow Falling on Cedars (1994)
- The Drowned Son (Stories)(1996)
- East of the Mountains (1999)
- Our Lady of the Forest (2003)
- The Other (2008)
- Ed King (2011)
- Songs for a Summons (Poetry) (Feb. 10, 2014)
- Problems with People: Stories (June 3, 2014)
- Turn Around Time: A Walking Poem for the Pacific Northwest (September 2019)
- The Final Case (January 11, 2022)
