= Dallas–Fort Worth Film Critics Association Awards 1999 =

1999 award cemony in Dallas, TX

5th Dallas-Fort Worth Film Critics Association Awards
- Date: January 2000
- Location: Dallas, Texas
- Country: United States
- Presented by: Dallas-Fort Worth Film Critics Association
- Website: dfwfilmcritics.net

The 5th Dallas-Fort Worth Film Critics Association Awards honored the best in film for 1999.

== Winners ==
- Best Actor:
  - Kevin Spacey - American Beauty
- Best Actress:
  - Hilary Swank - Boys Don't Cry
- Best Director:
  - Sam Mendes - American Beauty
- Best Picture:
  - American Beauty
- Best Supporting Actor:
  - Haley Joel Osment - The Sixth Sense
- Best Supporting Actress:
  - Julianne Moore - Cookie's Fortune
