= Florida Film Critics Circle Awards 1999 =

Annual US film awards ceremony

4th FFCC Awards

January 9, 2000

Best Film:
Magnolia

The 4th Florida Film Critics Circle Awards, given on 9 January 2000, recognized achievements in film for 1999. The Florida Film Critics Circle (FFCC) is an organization of film critics and writers from print and online publications in Florida founded in 1996.

== Winners ==
- Best Actor:
  - Kevin Spacey - American Beauty
- Best Actress:
  - Hilary Swank - Boys Don't Cry
- Best Animated Film:
  - The Iron Giant
- Best Cast:
  - Magnolia
- Best Cinematography:
  - Snow Falling on Cedars and Bringing Out the Dead - Robert Richardson
- Best Director:
  - Sam Mendes - American Beauty
- Best Documentary:
  - Buena Vista Social Club
- Best Film:
  - Magnolia
- Best Foreign Language Film:
  - Run Lola Run (Lola rennt) • Germany
- Best Newcomer:
  - Spike Jonze - Being John Malkovich and Three Kings
- Best Screenplay:
  - Election - Alexander Payne and Jim Taylor
- Best Supporting Actor:
  - Haley Joel Osment - The Sixth Sense
- Best Supporting Actress:
  - Catherine Keener - Being John Malkovich
- Pauline Kael Breakout Award:
  - Spike Jonze - Being John Malkovich and Three Kings
- Golden Orange for Outstanding Contribution to Film:
  - Dan Myrick, Eduardo Sanchez, Gregg Hale, Robin Cowie, and Michael Monello
