= Ruby Wilson =

American blues and gospel singer (1948–2016)

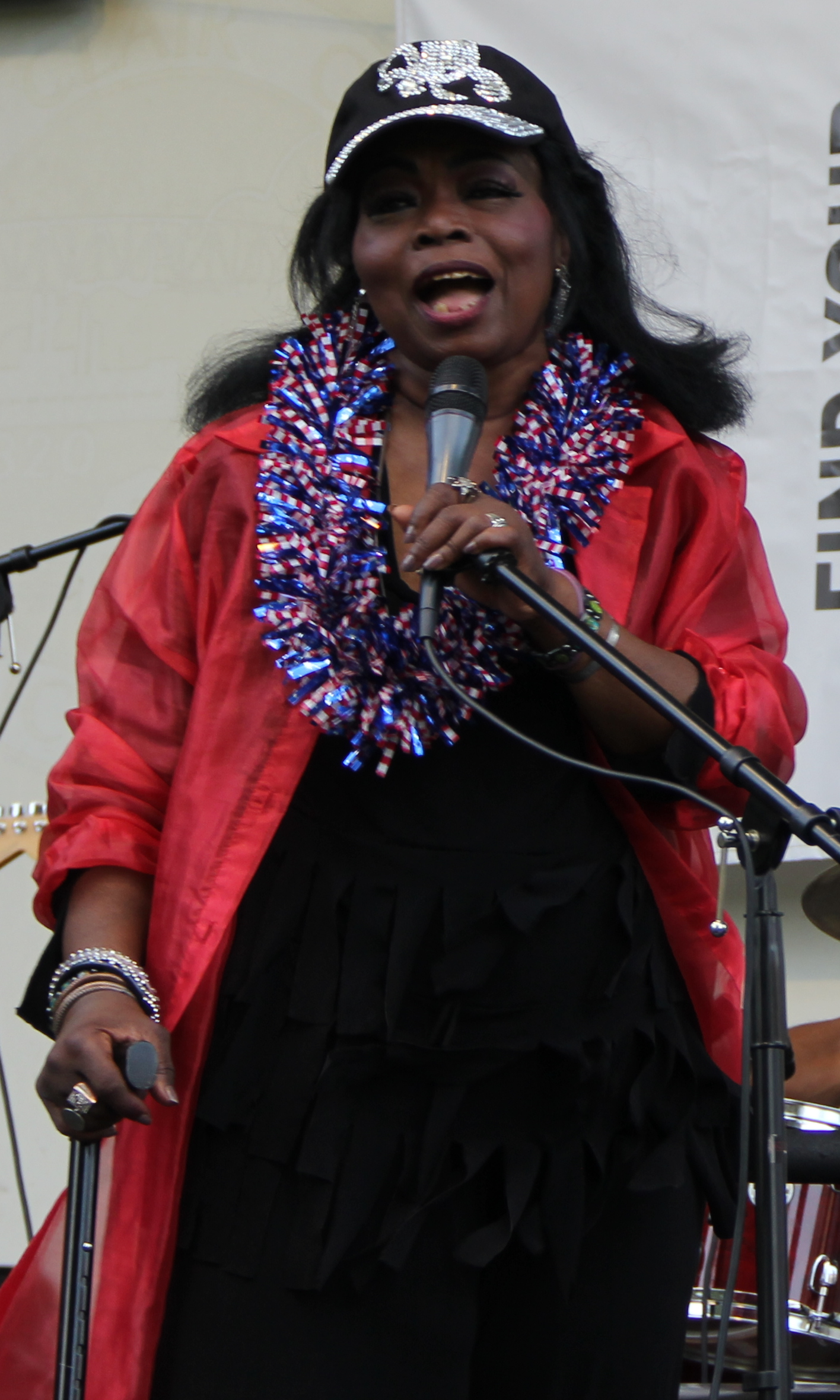
- Wilson performing in 2016

Background information
- Born: February 29, 1948; Fort Worth, Texas, U.S.
- Died: August 12, 2016 (aged 68) Memphis, Tennessee, U.S.
- Genres: Blues; gospel
- Occupation: Singer
- Instrument: Vocals
- Years active: 1963–2016
- Label: Malaco Records

Ruby Wilson (February 29, 1948 – August 12, 2016) was an American blues and gospel singer. She was known as "The Queen of Beale Street" as she sang in clubs on Beale Street, Memphis, Tennessee, for over 40 years. She had a successful touring and recording career, and appeared in a number of films.

== Early life ==
Wilson was born in Fort Worth, Texas, United States, the youngest in a family of six children. Her mother was a maid, her father was self-employed, and Wilson grew up picking and chopping cotton - work she later described as hot and unpleasant.

Wilson's upbringing was filled with music, from two quite different sources - her mother, a deeply religious woman, only allowed her children to listen to gospel music, as she believed that all other music was "the devil's music". Wilson's mother was the choir director at their family church, and when she was 7 years old Wilson began singing in her mother's choir. On the other hand, Wilson's father loved blues and Wilson listened with him to blues musicians, which had a strong influence on her future career.

Wilson met B.B. King for the first time when she was 14; King offered to be her godfather, and the two became close. When she was 15 years old, singer Shirley Caesar heard Wilson singing at church and invited her to tour with her as a backing singer. The following year, Wilson moved to Chicago, where she became a church choir director and sang gospel. She later returned to Texas and started singing jazz.

== Career ==
Wilson moved to Memphis, Tennessee, in 1972, and started working as a kindergarten teacher in the Memphis City School system. She also began performing regularly in clubs on Beale Street, including The Peabody, Club Handy and Club Royale, with musicians such as Ray Charles, Isaac Hayes, and the Four Tops. When B.B. King opened his B.B. King's Blues Club, she was given a weekly residency there, and when he later opened a restaurant, Itta Bena, she also became a regular performer there.

As Wilson's career developed, she toured the United States and internationally, and performed at blues and jazz festivals in Europe, Asia and New Zealand. She performed at the New Orleans Jazz & Heritage Festival, and for President Clinton and Vice-President Gore, Queen Elizabeth II and Prince Rainier III of Monaco and his son Prince Albert. Wilson also performed on cruise ships and river cruises, and at parties and corporate events. Some of the bands which she performed with were the Hot Cotton Jazz Band, Buck Bubbles Express, the Unknown Band, the King Beez, B. B. King All Stars, Ms. Ruby’s Band and the Detroit People’s Band.

In the 1980s, Wilson spent some years living in Los Angeles and performed with Joan Rivers and Sharon Gless.

In 1976 she was offered her first record contract, with Malaco Records. Her first album, Ruby Wilson, was released by Malaco in 1981, and she released a further nine albums in her career. Two, Cake Walking Babies (1988) and Outstanding In Their Field (1989) were recorded with the Hot Cotton Jazz Band.

== Film appearances ==
Wilson appeared in several films, including The People vs. Larry Flynt (1996), The Chamber (1996), Cookie's Fortune (1999) and Black Snake Moan (2006) as well as in television commercials.

== Recognition and honors ==
In 1992, after 20 years of singing in Beale Street clubs, local TV station WMC-TV gave her the title "Queen Ambassador of Beale Street"; two years later this was amended to "The Queen of Beale Street".

In 2006, Wilson received the Memphis Sound Award for Best Entertainer; in 2010, she was inducted into the Black Business Directory's African-American Hall of Fame.

In 2012, Wilson was offered space to exhibit items from her career, and later that year the Ruby Wilson Museum was opened. It displays memorabilia including awards, outfits and photographs. In 2013, Wilson received a W.C. Handy Heritage Awards Lifetime Achievement Award.

The Beale Street Walk of Fame includes a brass note recognising Wilson's contribution to the street's music.

== Personal life ==
Wilson was married four times. Her first husband was a gospel entertainer from Chicago. Her fourth husband was B.B. King's road manager.

== Later years and death ==
Wilson suffered a stroke in 2009, and was unable to speak for four months. She received speech therapy and physical therapy and eventually recovered enough to return to acting and singing. She suffered a heart attack in 2016, and after several days in a coma died on August 12, aged 68.

She was survived by four children, twelve grandchildren, and five great-grandchildren.
