= Anne Rapp =

American screenwriter

Anne Rapp is an American filmmaker, screenwriter and script supervisor. She has worked on more than 50 feature films since 1981 and collaborated with filmmaker Robert Altman during the last decade of his career.

== Early life ==
Rapp was born in Texas. She got a bachelor's degree in mathematics from Wayland Baptist College and worked as a travel agent for a time.

== Career ==
Rapp's work as a script supervisor, spawned from lack of direction in her life and dissatisfaction with her prior job, spanned many genres and budget levels, with some of the best known including Tender Mercies, This Is Spinal Tap, The Color Purple, The Accidental Tourist, Uncle Buck, Walk Hard: The Dewey Cox Story and Ender's Game.

Encouraged by filmmaker Robert Benton, Rapp began writing, starting with short stories. Her subsequent work with Altman, beginning with a 1997 episode of Gun, on the 1999 black comedy Cookie's Fortune led to her nomination for an Independent Spirit Award and an Edgar Allan Poe Award. She would work with Altman again on the romantic comedy Dr. T & The Women in 2000. The movie was primarily filmed in Dallas, Texas. Rapp was also commissioned to adapt Raymond Carver stories into a Short Cuts sequel. However, Altman decided not to make the film ultimately.

In 2020, she would direct and produce the documentary Horton Foote: The Road to Home, chronicling the life and work of Texan writer Horton Foote.

== Personal life ==
She currently resides in Austin. She was a visiting professor at the James A. Michener Center for Writers at The University of Texas at Austin. She taught screenwriting.
