= List of crime films of the 1990s =

This is a list of crime films released in the 1990s.

- List of crime films of 1990
- List of crime films of 1991
- List of crime films of 1992
- List of crime films of 1993
- List of crime films of 1994
- List of crime films of 1995
- List of crime films of 1996
- List of crime films of 1997
- List of crime films of 1998
- List of crime films of 1999
