= Cookie's Fortune =

1999 film by Robert Altman

- Theatrical release poster
- Directed by: Robert Altman
- Written by: Anne Rapp
- Produced by: Robert Altman; Etchie Stroh; David Levy; James McLindon; Willi Baer
- Starring: Glenn Close; Julianne Moore; Liv Tyler; Chris O'Donnell; Charles S. Dutton; Patricia Neal; Ned Beatty; Courtney B. Vance; Donald Moffat; Lyle Lovett
- Cinematography: Toyomichi Kurita
- Edited by: Abraham Lim
- Music by: David A. Stewart
- Production companies: New Films International; Sandcastle 5 Elysian Dreams
- Distributed by: October Films
- Release dates: January 22, 1999 (Sundance Film Festival); April 2, 1999 (U.S.)
- Running time: 118 minutes
- Country: United States
- Language: English
- Budget: $8 million
- Box office: $10.9 million

Cookie's Fortune is a 1999 American independent Southern Gothic black comedy crime film directed by Robert Altman, and starring Glenn Close, Julianne Moore, Liv Tyler, Patricia Neal, Charles S. Dutton, and Chris O'Donnell. It follows a dysfunctional family in small-town Mississippi and their various responses to the suicide of their wealthy aunt, some of them turning criminal. Musicians Lyle Lovett and Ruby Wilson have minor supporting parts in the film.

Filming took place on location in Holly Springs, Mississippi, where the film is set. It premiered at the Sundance Film Festival in January 1999, and was entered into the 49th Berlin International Film Festival, held in February 1999.

== Plot ==
Jewel Mae "Cookie" Orcutt, an elderly dowager in Holly Springs, Mississippi, lives alone in a large house and is helped out daily by Willis Richland, her African American handyman and closest friend. After acting strangely, she commits suicide with one of her late husband Buck's pistols.

Her pretentious niece, Camille, who directs local church theater productions, stops by later that day to borrow a glass fruit bowl. She is accompanied by her witless and submissive younger sister, Cora, with whom she lives. Camille finds Cookie's body in the bedroom and drops the bowl, shattering it and inadvertently cutting herself. Believing that "suicide is a disgrace", Camille eats Cookie's suicide note and attempts to stage her death to look like a robbery-murder. She removes a prized diamond and ruby necklace from Cookie's neck and throws the pistol in the garden (observed while doing so by Ronnie, a young boy who lives next door). Camille coaches Cora to say that Cookie was murdered, and summons Sheriff Lester Boyle to the scene.

Meanwhile, Cora's estranged and wayward daughter (and Cookie's grandniece), Emma, returns to town after having moved away following several supposed criminal offenses. Jason, an inept sheriff's deputy investigating Cookie's death, has long been romantically pursuing Emma. Willis is the primary suspect because his fingerprints appear on the gun she used to kill herself, but this is only because he had cleaned her guns the night before at her request. He is detained on suspicion of murder. The same night, Jason encounters Camille and Cora moving into Cookie's house, despite it being an active crime scene, and calls backup to escort them off the property. Cora is shocked to find that Willis is the suspect, Emma openly protests it, and Camille feigns surprise.

Emma visits Willis at the police station, where Boyle and a local attorney, Jack Palmer—both fishing buddies of Willis's—casually play Scrabble with him in his unlocked cell. Willis tells an anecdote about Cookie's prized diamond and ruby necklace, explaining that Buck once had the necklace appraised only to discover its jewels were fake, a fact he never disclosed to Cookie. Otis Tucker, a detective from a larger jurisdiction, arrives that night and begins questioning locals. Protesting Willis's detainment, Emma refuses to leave the police station until he is freed. She and Jason also frequently sneak away to have sex in empty offices at the station.

The next day, Easter Sunday, Emma arranges a holiday meal for Willis and herself in his cell. Meanwhile, Cora and Camille return to Cookie's home and begin cleaning her bloodied bedding and removing the crime scene tape, assuming they are to inherit the house. They are interrupted by Jack, who arrives to look for Cookie's will in a kitchen cookie jar, which Cora locates for him to Camille's frustration. At the station, Ronnie's father brings him in to recount seeing Camille throw the pistol in the garden; moreover, Camille's rare AB negative blood is recovered from the crime scene, excluding Willis as a suspect.

That night, Camille and Cora prepare to debut their production of Salome at the local church, in which Cora, Jason and Jack star. After police match the blood type to Camille, they descend upon the church as Cora is enticingly performing the play's Dance of the Seven Veils sequence. Cora is left free of her sister's influence when Camille is arrested and taken to the station, where Willis is prepared to be freed. Jack arrives to disclose Cookie's will, which bequeaths her entire estate to Willis, who is Buck's nephew; this was never disclosed to Camille or Emma, who never suspected it because of Willis's race. Emma is delighted to learn that she and Willis are cousins, but shocked when medical records show that Camille, not Cora, is her biological mother, conceived from an affair she had with Cora's late husband when they all lived together. Cora had given a transfusion of blood to save Camille and afterward covered for Camille's illegitimate child.

Tucker interrogates Camille the following morning. She recounts how she staged Cookie's suicide to look like a murder for the sake of "family pride." Cora, who has ignored phone calls at her house, arrives at the station, and Camille expects she will corroborate her story, but Cora confidently insists that Cookie did not commit suicide, sticking resolutely to the story Camille concocted. Camille is charged with Cookie's murder. Half-delirious, she reenacts the Dance of the Seven Veils in her cell before throwing herself down on her bunk and sobbing in despair. Meanwhile, Willis and Emma go fishing with Boyle and Jack, before Emma excuses herself for another tryst with Jason.

== Cast ==
- Glenn Close as Camille Dixon
- Julianne Moore as Cora Duvall
- Liv Tyler as Emma Duvall
- Chris O'Donnell as Jason Brown
- Charles S. Dutton as Willis Richland
- Patricia Neal as Jewel Mae "Cookie" Orcutt
- Ned Beatty as Deputy Lester Boyle
- Courtney B. Vance as Otis Tucker
- Donald Moffat as Jack Palmer
- Lyle Lovett as Manny Hood
- Danny Darst as Sheriff Billy Cox
- Matt Malloy as Eddie "The Expert" Pitts
- Randle Mell as Patrick Freeman
- Niecy Nash as Wanda Carter
- Rufus Thomas as Theo Johnson
- Ruby Wilson as Josie Martin
- Preston Strobel as Ronnie Freeman
- Anne Whitfield as Mrs. Henderson / Herodias

== Production ==
The screenplay is by Anne Rapp, and the film was produced by Willi Baer.

The film was shot on location in Holly Springs, Mississippi during the summer of 1998. Principal actors took pay cuts to appear in the film. The cast took up residence in a Holly Springs mansion for the duration of the shoot.

== Release ==
The film premiered at the Sundance Film Festival in January 1999, and was entered into the 49th Berlin International Film Festival, held in February 1999.

=== Box office ===
Cookie's Fortune was given a limited theatrical release in the United States on April 2, 1999, and grossed $186,828 during its opening weekend. The release eventually expanded to 559 theaters, and remained in theaters for a total of 279 days, ultimately grossing $10.9 million.

=== Critical response ===
On review aggregator Rotten Tomatoes, the film has 86% approval based on 58 reviews with an average rating of 7.5/10. The website's critics consensus reads, "Robert Altman's gift for diffuse storytelling is employed to breezily enjoyable effect in Cookie's Fortune, a mirthful caper that layers on a generous helping of Southern charm." On Metacritic, the film holds a score of 71/100 based on 28 critics, indicating "generally favorable" reviews.

Kevin Thomas of the Los Angeles Times praised the film as "a gem among the fabled director’s ensemble movies, a Southern charmer—full of good humor and mature wisdom—that views human foibles with the bemused compassion of a Jean Renoir... [it is a] beautiful, beguiling film." Desson Thomson of The Washington Post gave the film modest praise, writing: "By reducing his passion for actorly preciousness, Western Union symbolism and klutzy metaphor, Altman functions instead as a good manager of a decently written product. And he adheres sensibly to the filmmaking style that has served him for decades: introduce the actors to this moss-covered, indolent world, then leave them to sort things out in time for the ending. It's a simple formula but it works fine, even in the sleepiest of situations."

== Soundtrack ==
The soundtrack is by David A. Stewart. The soundtrack album was released on April 2, 1999. It features appearances by saxophonist Candy Dulfer.

1. "Cookie"
2. "Wild Women Don't Get the Blues"
3. "Helios"
4. "Camilla's Prayer"
5. "The Cookie Jar"
6. "Hey Josie"
7. "All I'm Sayin' Is This"
8. "A Good Man"
9. "I Did Good Didn't I?"
10. "A Golden Boat"
11. "I'm Comin' Home"
12. "Willis Is Innocent"
13. "Patrol Car Blues"
14. "Emma"
15. "Humming Home"

All songs are by Stewart except "Cookie", "Camilla's Prayer" and "Patrol Car Blues", which are by Dulfer and Stewart.

== See also ==
- 1999 in film
- List of comedy films of the 1990s
- List of crime films of the 1990s
