= Cauleen Smith =

American film director

- Born: September 25, 1967 (age 59); Riverside, CA
- Other name: Kelly Gabron
- Occupations: Filmmaker, artist
- Known for: Film
- Notable work: Drylongso
- Awards: United States Artists Fellowship (2018); Film Independent Spirit Awards - Someone to Watch Award (1999)

Cauleen Smith (born September 25, 1967) is an American filmmaker and multimedia artist. She is best known for her feature film Drylongso and her experimental works that address the African-American identity, specifically the issues facing black women today. Smith is currently a professor in the Department of Art at the University of California - Los Angeles.

== Education ==
In 1991, Smith completed her B.A in Cinema at San Francisco State University. While a student there, she completed several films, including Daily Rains, which was completed in 1990, and Chronicles of a Lying Spirit by Kelly Gabron, which was fully completed in 1993.

Smith was accepted into M.F.A. program at UCLA in 1994. In her second year of the program, Smith decided to shoot a feature-length film titled Drylongso. However, it was against UCLA's rules for film students to shoot feature-length films, "and for good reason, you don’t know what you are doing!" as Smith has said. She was, after some struggles, able to complete the film, and it got a significant amount of attention at the Sundance Film Festival, and took home several Best Film awards from other festivals, mentioned below. In 1998, Smith graduated from UCLA with her M.F.A. and a growing reputation as an up-and-coming force in the film industry.

In 2007, she attended the Skowhegan School of Painting and Sculpture in Maine.

== Drylongso ==
Drylongso, shot during Smith's time in graduate school at UCLA, takes place in Oakland, CA and follows a young African-American woman named Pica on her quest to photograph what she believes to be the dying breed of African American men. Throughout the film, Pica struggles to balance her project, her dysfunctional home life, and new friendships, all while a serial killer, whose victims include some of her own photography subjects, is terrorizing her neighborhood. The film brings up the topic of gang violence that took place in Oakland which claimed the lives of many innocent African-American young men. "Drylongso" is an old African-American term meaning "same old" or "everyday". Drylongso was well received at many film festivals, including Sundance Film Festival. In 2000, Drylongso also won best feature at the Urbanworld Festival, the Los Angeles Pan-African Film Festival, and the Philadelphia International Film Festival.

== Chicago ==
Smith has held consecutive residencies in Chicago at ThreeWalls, the Black Metropolis Research Consortium, and the Experimental Sound Studio in addition to an artist residency at the University of Chicago Arts Incubator. In 2012, Smith installed overlapping shows at the Museum of Contemporary Art, Chicago and ThreeWalls, and was named Outstanding Artist by the National Alliance for Media Arts and Culture. Smith has also been a Visiting Artist at the School of the Art Institute of Chicago while exploring the intersection of art, protest, commerce, and community on Chicago's South Side.

Smith's site-specific installation, "17," ran from March 10, 2013, to July 7, 2013, both at the Hyde Park Art Center and on the corner of East Garfield Boulevard and Prairie Avenue on the South Side. "17" features approximately 260 feet of hand screen-printed wallpaper. The title of this exhibition materialized from Smith's "meditations on the number’s spiritual significance as a marker of immortality" and further alludes to numerous aspects of art and culture spanning from ancient history to modern day. "17" was also inspired by Smith's research of the life and legacy of Sun Ra. Sun Ra, a student of numerology, was interested in a kind of "cultural immortality” for which the number "17" has been said to carry significance.

Smith was one of 63 artists whose work was exhibited as part of the 2017 Whitney Biennial. Her elaborately designed hand-stitched banners were hung from the ceiling. The banners are in response to the artist's "disgust and fatigue" from having watched videos of police violence against black people. Smith and artist Aram Han Sifuentes facilitated a workshop in conjunction with the biennial called Protest Banner Lending Library a project Sifuentes had initiated in Chicago.

Smith's "Human_3.0 Reading List" was exhibited at the Art Institute of Chicago in 2017. The project conceived in 2015 consists of 57 drawings—each produced on 8 1/2 × 12-inch graph paper in watercolor over graphite, occasionally elaborated with acrylic of 14 books. Smith describes these books as such: "These are some of the books that literally changed my life, saved my life and sustain my life, but also, (fair warning) make it difficult for me to go along, get along, look the other way, and gets mines."

== Los Angeles ==
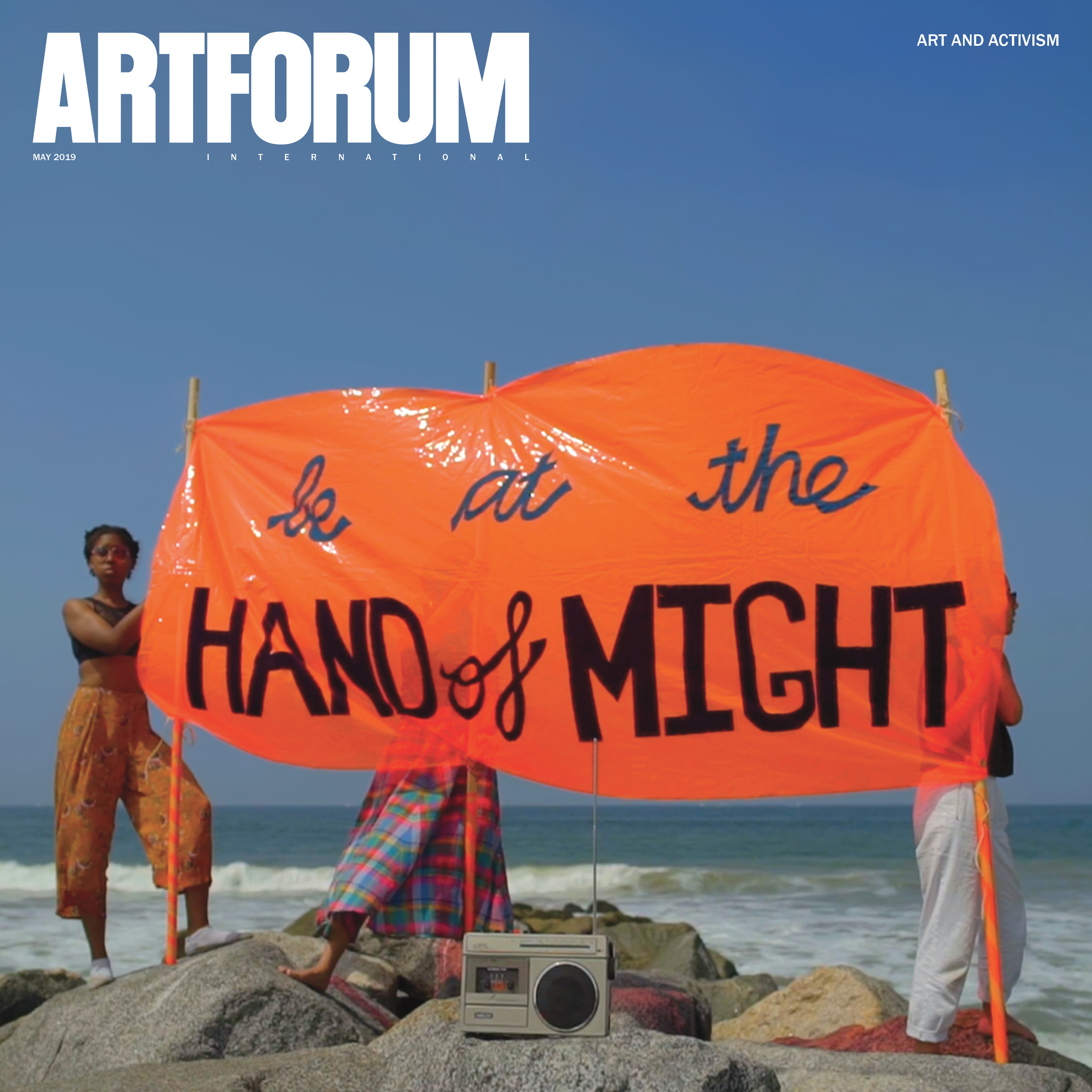
Cauleen Smith and Sojourner featured in the cover art of Artforum magazine (May 2019)

Smith's "Give It or Leave It" was exhibited at the Institute of Contemporary Art, Philadelphia in 2018, with support provided by an Ellsworth Kelly Award from the Foundation for Contemporary Arts. The description of the exhibit reads, "Through films, objects, and installation, Give It or Leave It offers an emotional axis by which to navigate four distinct universes: Alice Coltrane and her ashram, a 1966 photo shoot by Bill Ray at Simon Rodia’s Watts Towers, Noah Purifoy and his desert assemblages, and black spiritualist Rebecca Cox Jackson and her Shaker community. These locations, while not technically utopian societies, embody sites of historical speculation and radical generosity between artist and community. In reimagining a future through this mix, Smith casts a world that is black, feminist, spiritual, and unabashedly alive.

Smith exhibited her ongoing multimedia work, Black Utopia LP, as a part of the International Film Festival Rotterdam in 2019. According to Hyperallergic, "The performance was primarily part of a program of Smith's work that included a screening of her recent shorts, a new 16mm restoration of her much acclaimed, rarely seen 1988 feature film Drylongso, and a previously unscreened short film, Sojourner, in the festival's Tiger Short Film Competition."

In 2019, Smith's work was included in the exhibit "Loitering Is Delightful," at the LA Municipal Gallery in the Barnsdall Art Park.

== Solar Flare Arkestral Marching Band Project ==
Marking Smith's entrance onto the Chicago art scene was her work in creating the Solar Flare Arkestral Marching Band Project, the yield from her residency with Threewalls. Composed of members of the Rich South High School (Richton Park, Illinois) marching band and occasionally the South Shore Drill Team as well, the Solar Flare Arkestral Marching Band descended like a flash mob on various parts of Chicago that had been hit with waves of youth violence, including Chinatown and the meatpacking district, a few times throughout the fall of 2010, playing and dancing to an orchestration of Sun Ra's "Space is the Place" led by music director Y. L. Douglas. Smith coupled the militant undertones of marching bands with the Sun Ra-style of free jazz in an attempt to combat youth violence with music.

== Afrofuturism ==
Smith is a player in the movement of Afrofuturism, an emergent literary and cultural aesthetic that combines elements of science fiction, historical fiction, fantasy, Afrocentricity, and magic realism with non-Western cosmologies in order to critique not only the present-day dilemmas of people of color, but also to revise, interrogate, and re-examine the historical events of the past.

In an interview with BOMB Magazine in 2011, Smith noted: "There’s the strand of my work that is Afrofuturist. Afrofuturism, for me, is about speculating on the potentiality of what is known about technology and physics to create metaphors that allow me to explore an African diasporic past and generate possible narratives for the future. Dark Matter is part of this. I had constructed an alien narrative—not an alien-abduction story, but one about alien assimilation. Aliens are never caught. Nobody ever notices them. The conflict is that the world that they land in doesn’t work for them; it’s toxic for them. But Afrofuturism is also a rumination on memories to which I have no access. My investment in it as a production strategy has run its course; Afrofuturism provides a way to investigate trauma very explicitly. But we only reenact traumas, don’t we? We don’t reenact prom night, or our favorite birthday party. This is a problem—it doesn’t seem to fix things; it amplifies them. There’s gotta be something else, the after-the-trauma."

== Filmography ==
- 2020-2021
  - Juan Sánchez Cotán and Cauleen Smith: Mystical Time and Deceptive Light, the San Diego Museum of Art.
- 2019
  - Black Utopia LP at the International Film Festival Rotterdam
- 2010
  - Remote Viewing. 4K digital Video. TRT: 15:00. Funded by Creative Capital.
  - The Grid. 4K digital Video. TRT: 15:00. Funded by Creative Capital.
  - T Minus Two. Digitized 16mm. TRT: 2:00.
  - Good Clean Family Fun. Digitized 16mm. TRT: 5:00.
  - Black and Blue Over You (after Bas Jan Ader for Ishan).TRT: 8:00.
  - Demon Fuzz. (loop) Digitized 35mm. TRT: 7:00
  - Elsewhere. (Installation loop) Digitized 35mm. TRT: 5:30
  - Sine at the Canyon Sine at the Sea. Appropriated 16mm NASA films. TRT: 4:00.
- 2009
  - Not the Black. MiniDV. TRT: 1:39.
- 2008
  - Entitled Super-8. TRT: 6:30”
  - The Fullness of Time MiniDV. Single Channel. TRT: 50:00”
- 2007
  - Nebulae – Austin. 16mm film installation with sculptural component.
  - Right Hand Only Left Hand Lonely Two Channel Video Installation
- 2006
  - (Afro)Galactic Postcards from M94 Three 20MB Video Podcasts and Website
  - I Want to See My Skirt Multi-Channel Video with sculptural component. In Collaboration with poet, AaronVan Jordan.
  - Marriage Is for White People Two Channel Video and 3D Installation.
  - Cantata for Salamanders and Twelve Choirs In Collaboration with artist, Daniel Bozhkov. S-16.
  - Dark Matter and the Post Card Video Experimental Narrative. DV. 8 and 2.5 minutes.
  - The Carbonist School Study Hall Commissioned documentary featuring the founding members of The Carbonist School. MiniDV. 12.
- 2005
  - The Green Dress Series Six Channel. 35mm. Color. Sound.14 minutes. Six channel loop.
- 2003
  - Hollywould If She Could. DV Narrative. 15 minutes.
- 2001
  - The Changing Same 35mm 9.5 minutes.
- 1998
  - Drylongso 82 minutes 16mm narrative. Distributed by Video Data Bank.
- 1997
  - White Suit 16mm 3.5 minutes.
  - Sapphire Tape #2: VHS. Five minutes.
- 1995
  - A Thousand Words 16mm 14 minutes. 1993
  - Sapphire Tape #1: The Message VHS video.
  - Memory Poison Bones Site-specific installation.
  - Chronicles of a Lying Spirit by Kelly Gabron 16mm 5.5 minutes.
- 1990
  - Daily Rains. 16 mm. 12 minutes.
- 1989
  - Wall Doc VHS. 6 minutes.

== Grants and awards ==
- 1993
  - Special Merit Award, National Black Programming Consortium
- 1998
  - Honorable Mention, Hamptons Film Festival
- 1999
  - Honorable Mention Best Feature Film, Hamptons Film Festival
- 2000
  - Nomination for Independent Spirit Award Best Debut Performance (Toby Smith in Drylongso)
  - Independent Spirit Award, Someone to Watch Award.
  - Best Feature Film at Los Angeles Pan-African Film Festival, Drylongso
- 2001
  - Best Feature Film at Urbanworld Film Festival, Drylongso
- 2008
  - Jury Award: Best Film, New Orleans Human Rights Film Festival
  - James D. Phelan Art Award in Film, Video, and Digital Media
  - San Francisco Foundation Creative Capital Award
- 2012
  - Outstanding Artist Award, National Alliance for Media Arts and Culture
- 2015
  - Artadia Award
  - Danish Jukniu First Prize Award, Tirana Open 1
- 2016
  - Herb Alpert Award in the Arts, Film and Video.
  - Ellsworth Kelly Award, Foundation for Contemporary Arts
- 2018
  - United States Artists (USA) Fellowship
- 2020
  - Joyce Alexander Wein Artist Prize, Studio Museum, Harlem, New York
- 2022
  - 27th Annual Heinz Award for the Arts
- 2022
  - Anonymous Was a Woman Award

== Preservation ==
Smith's film Chronicles of a Lying Spirit by Kelly Gabron was preserved by the Academy Film Archive in 2016.
