= Eva Kolodner =

American film producer

Eva Kolodner is a former independent film producer and co-founder of New York-based Salty Features.

== Early life and education ==
Eva Marie Kolodner was born c. 1970 to Dorothy M. Chiavetta and Ignace I. Kolodner and grew up in Pittsburgh. Her father was a mathematics professor at Carnegie Mellon University. Her mother headed the department of nutrition services for the Allegheny County Health Department. She graduated from Winchester Thurston School in 1988 and earned a B.A. in psychology from Yale University in 1992.

== Career ==
Kolodner got her start in the independent film industry as an unpaid assistant to Christine Vachon at Vachon's independent production company, Killer Films. She worked at Killer Films for five years, working on films including Kids, I Shot Andy Warhol, Safe and Happiness as she "worked her way through the producing hierarchy", according to trade journal Independent. While working with Killer Films, Kolodner produced with Kimberly Peirce, then an undergrad at Columbia University, the Academy Award-winning film Boys Don't Cry based on Peirce's script.

In 2000, she became Head of Production at Madstone Films, where she produced Rhinoceros Eyes, directed by Aaron Woodley and starring Michael Pitt, which won the Discovery Award at the 2003 Toronto International Film Festival. At Madstone she hired Yael Melamede, who had trained as an architect but moved into the film industry in 1996, as a production supervisor. The two launched Salty Features in 2003. Kolodner left the company in 2009 to switch careers, becoming a fundraiser for nonprofits.

== Recognition ==
Kolodner was nominated for the Independent Spirit Producer's Award, and in 2002 was selected for Crain's New York Business’ “40 Under 40.”

== Production ==
- Finn at the Blue Line (2008)
- Afterwards (2008)
- Brief Interviews with Hideous Men (2008)
- The Inner Life of Martin Frost (2007)
- Bam Bam and Celeste (2005)
- Evergreen (2004)
- Rhinoceros Eyes (2003)
- Boys Don't Cry (1999)

== Personal life ==
Kolodner married Eliza Starr Byard, whom she'd met while they were undergraduates at Yale, in 2004. The couple adopted a child.
