= Boys Don't Cry (1999 film) =

1999 film by Kimberly Peirce

- Theatrical release poster
- Directed by: Kimberly Peirce
- Written by: Kimberly Peirce; Andy Bienen
- Produced by: Jeffrey Sharp; John Hart; Eva Kolodner; Christine Vachon
- Starring: Hilary Swank; Chloë Sevigny; Peter Sarsgaard; Brendan Sexton III; Alison Folland; Alicia Goranson; Matt McGrath; Rob Campbell; Jeannetta Arnette
- Cinematography: Jim Denault
- Edited by: Tracey Granger; Lee Percy
- Music by: Nathan Larson
- Production companies: Independent Film Channel Productions; Killer Films; Hart-Sharp Entertainment
- Distributed by: Fox Searchlight Pictures
- Release dates: October 8, 1999 (New York Film Festival); October 22, 1999 (United States)
- Running time: 118 minutes
- Country: United States
- Language: English
- Budget: $2 million
- Box office: $20.7 million

Boys Don't Cry is a 1999 American biographical drama film directed by Kimberly Peirce, and co-written by Peirce and Andy Bienen. The film is a dramatization of the real-life story of Brandon Teena (played by Hilary Swank), an American trans man who attempts to find himself and love in Nebraska but falls victim to a brutal hate crime perpetrated by two male acquaintances. The film co-stars Chloë Sevigny as Brandon's girlfriend, Lana Tisdel.

After reading about the case while in college, Peirce conducted extensive research for a screenplay, which she worked on for almost five years. The film focuses on the relationship between Brandon and Lana. The script took dialogue directly from archive footage in the 1998 documentary The Brandon Teena Story. Many actresses sought the lead role during a three-year casting process before Swank was cast. Swank was chosen because her personality seemed similar to Brandon's. Most of the film's characters were based on real-life people; others were composites.

Filming occurred during October and November 1998 in the Dallas, Texas area. The producers initially wanted to film in Falls City, Nebraska, where the real-life events had taken place; however, budget constraints meant that principal photography had to occur in Texas. The film's cinematography uses dim and artificial lighting throughout and was influenced by a variety of styles, including neorealism and the films of Martin Scorsese, while the soundtrack consisted primarily of country, blues, and rock music. The film's themes include the nature of romantic and platonic relationships, the causes of violence against LGBTQ people, especially transgender people, and the relationship among social class, race, and gender.

The film premiered at the New York Film Festival on October 8, 1999, before appearing at various other film festivals. Distributed by Fox Searchlight Pictures, the film received a limited release in the United States on October 22, 1999, and it performed well at the North American box office, gaining three times its production budget by May 2000. The film was acclaimed by critics, with many ranking it as one of the best films of the year; praise focused on the lead performances by Swank and Sevigny as well as the film's depiction of its subject matter. However, some people who had been involved with Brandon in real life criticized the film for not portraying the events accurately.

Boys Don't Cry was nominated for multiple awards; at the 72nd Academy Awards in 2000, Swank was awarded the Academy Award for Best Actress and Sevigny was nominated for Best Supporting Actress. The pair were also nominated at the 57th Golden Globe Awards, with Swank winning the Best Actress – Drama award. Boys Don't Cry, which dealt with controversial issues, was initially assigned an NC-17 rating but was later reclassified to an R rating. It was released on home video in September 2000. In 2019, the film was selected for preservation in the United States National Film Registry by the Library of Congress as being "culturally, historically, or aesthetically significant."

== Plot ==
In 1993, Brandon Teena is a young trans man living in rural Nebraska. When Brandon is discovered to be transgender by a former girlfriend's brother, he receives death threats. Soon after, he is involved in a bar fight and is evicted from his cousin's trailer. Brandon moves to Falls City, Nebraska, where he befriends ex-convicts John Lotter and Tom Nissen, and their friends Candace and Lana Tisdel. Brandon becomes romantically involved with Lana, who is initially unaware both of his anatomy and his troubled past. The two make plans to move to Memphis, Tennessee, where Brandon will manage Lana's karaoke singing career. Eventually, they kiss during a date night which ends with them having sex.

The police detain Brandon on charges that arose before his relocation; they place him in the women's section of the Falls City jail. Lana bails Brandon out and asks why he was placed in a women's jail. Brandon attempts to lie to her, saying he's a hermaphrodite born with intersex organs, and will soon receive genital reconstruction surgery, but Lana stops him, declaring her love for him regardless of his gender. However, while Brandon is in jail, Candace finds a number of documents listing Brandon's birth name, and she and her friends react to this news with shock and disgust. They enter Brandon's room, search among Brandon's things, and discover transgender pamphlets that confirm their suspicions. When Brandon and Lana return, Tom and John violently confront Brandon and take him into the bathroom, forcibly removing his pants and his white briefs, revealing his female genitals. They try to make Lana look, but she shields her eyes and turns away. After this confrontation, Tom and John drag Brandon into John's car and drive to an isolated location, where they brutally beat and take turns raping him.

Afterward, they take Brandon to Tom's house, but Brandon escapes by climbing through a bathroom window. Although his assailants threaten Brandon and warn him not to report the attack to the police, Lana convinces him to do so. However, the police chief proves to be less concerned with the crime and interrogates Brandon about his sexual identity.

Later, John and Tom get drunk and drive to Candace's house. Lana attempts to stop them, but they find Brandon and kill him along with Candace before fleeing the scene, while Lana lies with Brandon's body. The next morning, Lana awakens next to Brandon's corpse. Her mother arrives and takes her away from the scene. As Lana leaves Falls City, a letter to her from Brandon that she found on his body, is heard in a voiceover, saying that in Memphis "I'll be waiting for you, love always and forever".

== Cast ==
- Hilary Swank as Brandon Teena
- Chloë Sevigny as Lana Tisdel
- Peter Sarsgaard as John Lotter
- Brendan Sexton III as Marvin "Tom" Nissen
- Lecy Goranson as Candace (based on Lisa Lambert)
- Jeannetta Arnette as Linda Tisdel, Lana's mother
- Matt McGrath as Lonny, Brandon's cousin
- Alison Folland as Kate Lotter, John's sister and Lana's best friend
- Lou Perryman as Sheriff Charles B. Laux
- Cheyenne Rushing as Nicole, Brandon's fictional first girlfriend in Lincoln
- Libby Villari as The Nurse
- Gail Cronauer as Clerk
- Gabriel Horn as Lester, Restraining Order Guy

== Production ==
=== Background ===
Brandon Teena was a trans man who was gang raped and murdered by a group of male acquaintances in December 1993, when he was 21. (Note: Brandon Teena was never his legal name; other names may include his legal name, as well as "Billy Brinson", "Teena Ray", or "Charles Brayman".) Kimberly Peirce, at the time a Columbia University film student, became interested in the case after reading a 1994 Village Voice article by Donna Minkowitz. Peirce became engrossed in Brandon's life and death; she said, "the minute I read about Brandon, I fell in love. With the intensity of his desire to turn himself into a boy, the fact that he did it with no role models. The leap of imagination that this person took was completely overwhelming to me." The sensationalist news coverage of the case prolonged her interest. Peirce said she looked beyond the brutality of the case and instead viewed the positive aspects of Brandon's life as part of what eventually caused his death. She admired Brandon's audacity, ability to solve complicated problems, and what she perceived as the sense of fantasy invoked by his personality.

Peirce wanted to tell the story from Brandon's perspective. She was familiar with Brandon's desire to wear men's clothing: "I started looking at all the other coverage and a great deal of it was sensational. People were focusing on the spectacle of a girl who had passed as a boy because that is so unfamiliar to so many people. Where to me, I knew girls who had passed as boys, so Brandon was not some weird person to me. Brandon was a very familiar person." Peirce was influenced by the public perception of the case, believing the American public was generally misinformed: she said, "People were also focusing on the crime without giving it much emotional understanding and I think that's really dangerous, especially with this culture of violence that we live in". Peirce began working on a concept for the film and gave it the working title Take It Like a Man.

The project drew interest from various production companies. Diane Keaton's production company, Blue Relief, showed interest in the screenplay in the mid-1990s. Initially, the film was to be largely based on Aphrodite Jones' 1996 true crime book All She Wanted, which told the story of Brandon's final few weeks. Earlier drafts of the script incorporated scenes featuring Brandon's family background, including his sister Tammy and mother Joann, as well as some of Teena's ex-girlfriends. However, Peirce modified the script to fit her vision to focus on the relationship between Brandon and his 19-year-old girlfriend Lana Tisdel, which Peirce termed a "great love story", in contrast to All She Wanted, which did not place an emphasis on the relationship.

To fund the writing and development of the project, Peirce worked as a paralegal on a midnight shift and as a 35mm film projectionist; she also received a grant from the New York Foundation for the Arts. The project attracted the attention of producer Christine Vachon, who had seen a short film Peirce had made for her thesis in 1995 about the case. IFC Films, Hart Sharp Entertainment, and Killer Films, Vachon and Eva Kolodner's production company, provided financing for the project. IFC contributed roughly $1 million, but the film's eventual budget remained under $2 million. Peirce co-wrote the screenplay with Andy Bienen. They worked together for 18 months on the final drafts and were careful not to "mythologize" Brandon; the aim was to keep him as human as possible. In the editing stage of the script, Peirce sent the draft to Fox Searchlight Pictures, which agreed to produce and distribute the film while giving Peirce artistic license.

Prior to filming, Peirce researched the facts by interviewing the people surrounding the case. She immersed herself in the information available about the murder, including trial transcripts. She met Lana Tisdel at a convenience store and interviewed her at Tisdel's home. Tisdel, who began dating Brandon just two weeks before he was murdered, was 19 years old at the time of the murders and lived in Falls City with her mother. Peirce also interviewed Tisdel's mother and Brandon's acquaintances. However, she was unable to interview Brandon's mother or any of his biological family. Much factual information, including Nissen being a convicted arsonist, was incorporated into Boys Don't Cry.

=== Casting ===
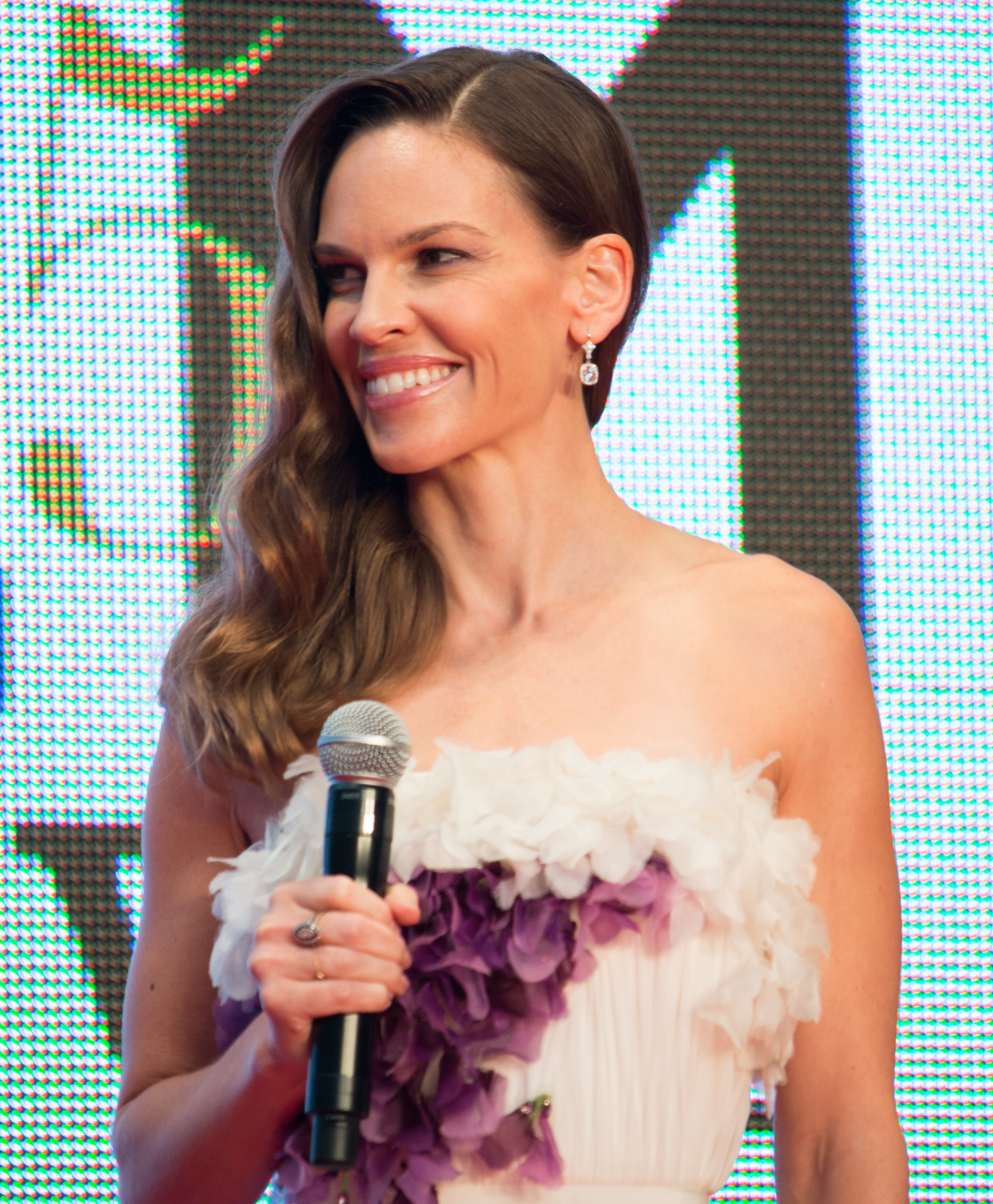
Hilary Swank

The filmmakers retained the names of most of the case's real-life protagonists, but the names of several supporting characters were altered. For example, the character of Candace was named Lisa Lambert in real life. The casting process for Boys Don't Cry lasted almost four years. Drew Barrymore was an early candidate to star in the film. Peirce scouted the LGBTQ community, looking mainly for masculine, lesbian women for the role of Brandon Teena. Peirce said the LGBT community was very interested in the project because of the publicity surrounding the murder. High-profile actors avoided Peirce's auditions at the request of their agents because of the stigma associated with the role.

At one point, the project was nearly abandoned because Peirce was not satisfied with most of the people who auditioned. In 1996, after a hundred female actors had been considered and rejected, the relatively unknown actor Hilary Swank sent a videotape to Peirce and was signed on to the project. Swank successfully passed as a boy to the doorman at her audition. During her audition, Swank, who was 22, lied to Peirce about her age. Swank said that, like Brandon, she was 21 years of age. When Peirce later confronted her about her lie, Swank responded, "But that's what Brandon would do." Swank's anonymity as an actor persuaded Peirce to cast her; Peirce said she did not want a "known actor" to portray Teena. In addition, Peirce felt that Swank's audition was "the first time I saw someone who not only blurred the gender lines, but who was this beautiful, androgynous person with this cowboy hat and a sock in her pants, who smiled and loved being Brandon."

Peirce required that Swank "make a full transformation" into a male. Immediately after being cast, Peirce took Swank to a hairdresser, where her lower-back length hair was cut and dyed chestnut brown. When she saw her then-husband, Chad Lowe, again, he barely recognized her. Swank prepared for the role by dressing and living as a man for at least a month, including wrapping her chest in tension bandages and putting socks down the front of her trousers as Brandon Teena had done. Her masquerade was convincing; Swank's neighbors believed the "young man" coming and going from her home was Swank's visiting brother. She reduced her body fat to seven percent to accentuate her facial structure and refused to let the cast and crew see her out of costume. Swank earned $75 per day for her work on Boys Don't Cry, totaling $3,000. Her earnings were so low that she did not qualify for health insurance.

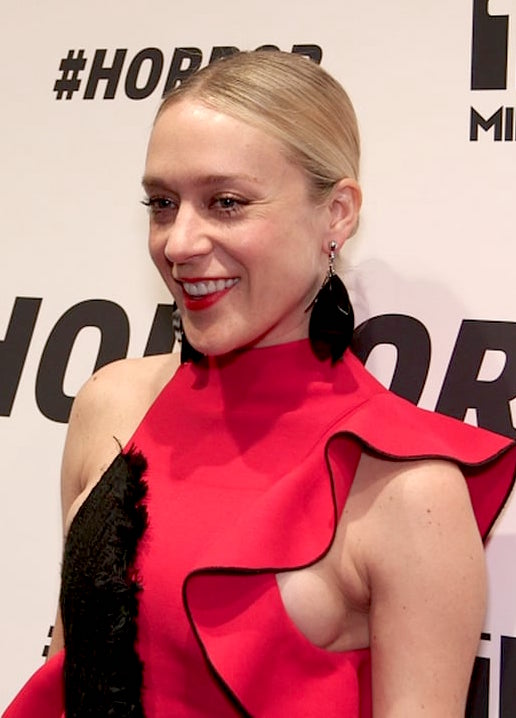
Chloë Sevigny

For the role of Brandon's girlfriend, Lana Tisdel, Peirce had envisioned a teenage Jodie Foster. The role was also offered to Reese Witherspoon and Sarah Polley. Peirce ultimately decided to cast Chloë Sevigny based on her performance in The Last Days of Disco (1998). Sevigny had auditioned for the role of Brandon, but Peirce decided Sevigny would be more suited to playing Lana because she could not picture Sevigny as a man.

There's a moment in The Last Days of Disco when Chloë does this little dance move and flirts with the camera [...] She has this mix of attractiveness, flirtation and sophistication that she gives you, but then takes away very quickly so that you want more: you want to reach into the screen and grab her. When I saw that, and her confidence and wit, I thought: if she could flirt with Brandon and the audience in that way, that's exactly what we need for Lana. I said to her, "Will you please audition to play Lana?" She said, "No." And I said, "OK, you can have the role."

Sevigny dyed her hair red for the role to match Lana's strawberry blonde hair. Peirce later said, "Chloë just surrendered to the part. She watched videos of Lana. She just became her very naturally."

Peter Sarsgaard played John Lotter, Lana's former boyfriend, who raped and murdered Teena. Sarsgaard was one of the first choices for the role. He later said he wanted his character to be "likable, sympathetic even", because he wanted the audience "to understand why they would hang out with me. If my character wasn't necessarily likable, I wanted him to be charismatic enough that you weren't going to have a dull time if you were with him." In another interview, Sarsgaard said he felt "empowered" by playing Lotter. In an interview with The Independent, Sarsgaard said, "I felt very sexy, weirdly, playing John Lotter. I felt like I was just like the sheriff, y'know, and that everyone loved me." Sarsgaard recalled watching footage of and reading about Lotter to prepare for the role. Peirce cast Alicia Goranson, known for playing Becky on the sitcom Roseanne, as Candace because of her likeness to Lisa Lambert. Like Sevigny, Goranson had also initially auditioned for the lead role.

=== Principal photography ===
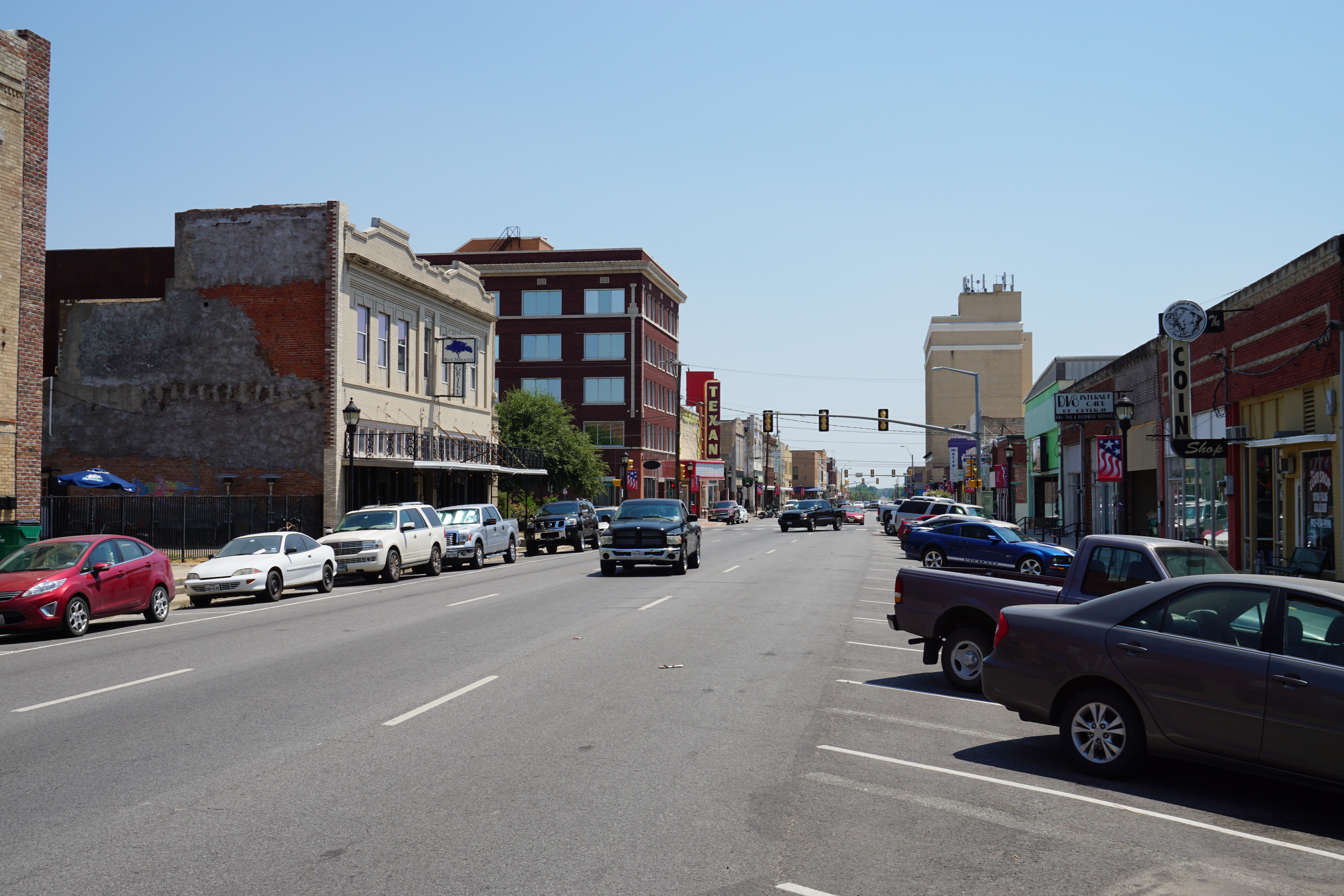
Boys Don't Cry was primarily shot in Greenville, Texas.

Initially, Boys Don't Cry was scheduled to film for thirty days. However, principal photography for the film lasted from October 19 to November 24, 1998. The small budget dictated some of the filming decisions, including the omission of some incidents to speed up the overall pacing. Timing constraints and Peirce's visions relating to the plot limited what could be achieved with the narrative. For example, the film portrays a double murder when in actuality a third person, Phillip DeVine—a black disabled man—was also killed at the scene. At the time, he had been dating Lana Tisdel's sister, Leslie, who was omitted from the story. Boys Don't Cry was primarily filmed in Greenville, Texas, a small town about 45 miles (72 km) northeast of Dallas. Most of the incidents in the case took place in Falls City, Nebraska, but budget constraints led the filmmakers to choose locations in Texas.

Peirce initially wanted to shoot in Falls City, but Vachon told her that filming there would not be possible. Afterwards, the film was going to be shot in Omaha, Nebraska, but Peirce felt that "none of [the places] looked right." In addition, Peirce also scouted filming locations in Kansas and Florida before deciding on Texas. One of Peirce's main goals was for the audience to sympathize with Brandon. On the film's DVD commentary track, Peirce said, "The work was informing me about how I wanted to represent it. I wanted the audience to enter deeply into this place, this character, so they could entertain these contradictions in Brandon's own mind and would not think he was crazy, would not think he was lying, but would see him as more deeply human."

Some scenes in Boys Don't Cry required emotional and physical intensity; these were allocated extended periods of filming. The scene in which Brandon, at the wishes of his friends, bumper-skis on the back of a pickup truck, was delayed when a police officer, just arriving at a shift change, required a large lighting crane to be moved from one side of the road to the other. The scenes took six hours to shoot and were filmed at sunrise, resulting in a blue sky being seen in the background. There were some technical complications: some of the filming equipment got stuck in the mud, and radio wires in some of the scenes conflicted with the sound production. Swank required a stunt double for a scene in which she falls off the back of a truck. Teena's rape scene was given an extended filming time; Sexton, who portrayed one of the attackers, walked away in tears afterward. Swank found portraying her character daunting and felt the need to "keep a distance" from the reality of the actual event. When scenes became difficult, Swank requested the company of her husband on set. At times, Peirce worked for seventeen hours a day to complete more work, but the other crew members told her that this was taking up potential nighttime filming hours.

=== Cinematography ===
Brandon's "passage to manhood". Peirce had intended the roller skate scene to be a metaphor for Brandon's formal entrance into masculinity. This image illustrates the dim lighting used throughout the film, giving a particular emphasis on artificial light stemming from the film's focus on confined interiors.

Peirce, who had originally sought a career in photography before moving into filmmaking, applied techniques she had learned to the film. She described the film's mood as an "artificial night". Director of Photography Jim Denault showed her the work of photographer Jan Staller, whose long-exposure night photography under artificial lighting inspired Denault to avoid using "moonlight" effects for most of the film. As a way to further incorporate the sense of artificial night, John Pirozzi, who had been experimenting with time-lapse photography using a non-motion-controlled moving camera, was invited to create the transition shots seen throughout the film.

The film's visual style depicts the Midwestern United States in a "withdrawn", dark and understated light to give a "surreal" effect. Denault shot Boys Don't Cry in flat, spherical format on 35mm film using Kodak Vision film stock. The film was shot with a Moviecam Compact camera fitted with Carl Zeiss super speed lenses. For the scene in which Brandon is stripped, a hand-held camera was used to give a sense of subjectivity and intimacy.

The use of low natural light and heavy artificial light is illustrated early in the film in the opening roller rink scene in which Brandon pursues his first relationship with a young woman. For this scene, Peirce used a three-shot method similar to that used in a scene in The Wizard of Oz (1939) in which Dorothy leaves her house and enters Oz. The scene consists of a three-shot sequence meant to symbolize Brandon's metaphorical "entrance to manhood", or Brandon's social transition from a woman to a man. Some scenes were given a prolonged shooting sequence to induce a feeling of hallucination. An example is the sequence in which Brandon and Lana first have sex, followed by a shot of her, Brandon, Candace, and Kate driving in a car against a city skyline backdrop. The scene in which John and Tom strip Brandon was filmed with three cameras due to time constraints, even though Peirce wanted six cameras to film it. The scene took an hour and a half to film in total.

Peirce drew inspiration from the filming style of John Cassavetes and the early work of Martin Scorsese, and she incorporated neo-realist techniques into the film. She was also influenced by a second style of work—the "magical" films of Michael Powell and Kenji Mizoguchi. The former style is used when Brandon joins the social circle of John, Tom, Lana and her mother, while the latter is used when Brandon and Lana begin to depart from that life. The film was also influenced by Bonnie and Clyde (1967). Peirce incorporated influences from Raging Bull (1980) by opening the film with a shot of Brandon traveling along a highway, as seen from the character's imaginative or dream perspective, similar to the beginning of Raging Bull. When a character expresses a dream or hopeful assertion, Peirce cuts to an "eerily lit" dream landscape. The Pawnbroker (1964) inspired the cinematography and editing of Brandon's rape scene, particularly in its use of fast cutting.

=== Music ===
Because the film is set in the rural Midwestern United States, the Boys Don't Cry soundtrack album features a compilation of country, blues and rock music. Nathan Larson and Nina Persson of The Cardigans composed an instrumental version of Restless Heart's 1988 country-pop song "The Bluest Eyes in Texas", a variation of which was used as the film's love theme and score. The song itself is heard during a karaoke scene, sung by Sevigny's character, and at the end of the film. The title of the film is taken from the song of the same name by British rock band The Cure. An American cover of the song, sung by Nathan Larson, plays in the background in the scene in which Lana bails Brandon out of jail and during one of their sex scenes. However, the song is not included in the released soundtrack. Songs by Lynyrd Skynyrd ("Tuesday's Gone"), Paisley Underground band Opal ("She's a Diamond") and The Charlatans ("Codine Blues") also appear in the film, as do cover versions of other songs. The soundtrack was released on November 23, 1999, by Koch Records. "The Bluest Eyes in Texas" was played when Hilary Swank went onstage to receive her Academy Award for Best Actress in 2000. The song also plays over the film's end credits.

== Themes and analysis ==
Unlike most films about mind-numbing tragedy, this one manages to be full of hope.

— Janet Maslin of The New York Times

Boys Don't Cry has been widely discussed and analyzed by scholars and others. Roger Ebert described the film as a "romantic tragedy" embedded in a working class American setting, calling it "Romeo and Juliet set in a Nebraska trailer park". Philosopher Rebecca Hanrahan argued that the question of identity—particularly Brandon's—is alluded to frequently in Boys Don't Cry and that Peirce poses the nature of identification and self as the film's main question. Journalist Janet Maslin said the film is about accepting identity, which in turn means accepting the fate predisposed for that identity. Paula Nechak called the film a "bold cautionary tale"; she regarded the film as a negative, dismal depiction of Midwestern America, writing that "[Peirce's film has] captured the mystique and eerie loneliness" and "isolation of the Midwest, with its dusty desolation and nowhere-to-go frustration that propels people to violence and despair".

Christine Vachon, the film's executive producer, said, "It's not just about two stupid thugs who killed somebody. It's about these guys whose world is so tenuous and so fragile that they can't stand to have any of their beliefs shattered", referring to John and Tom's views of their lives, Brandon's aspirations and his biological sex. Along with other turn-of-the-millennium films such as In the Company of Men (1997), American Beauty (1999), Fight Club (1999), and American Psycho (2000), Vincent Hausmann said Boys Don't Cry "raises the broader, widely explored issue of masculinity in crisis". Jason Wood said the film, together with Patty Jenkins's Monster (2003), is an exploration of "social problems".

=== Romantic and platonic relationships ===
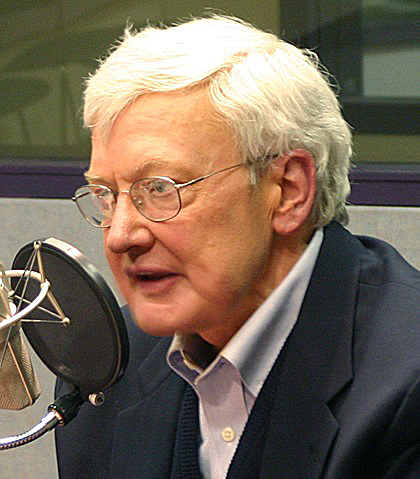
Roger Ebert praised the film and called it "Romeo and Juliet set in a Nebraska trailer park."

Several scholars commented on the relationship between Brandon and Lana as well as Brandon's relationship with John and Tom. Carol Siegel regarded the film as a thematically rich love story between two ill-fated lovers, similar to Romeo and Juliet. Jack Halberstam attributed Boys Don't Cry's success to its ostensible argument for tolerance of sexual diversity by depicting a relationship between two unlikely people.

This tragic aspect of the love story led Halberstam to compare Brandon and Lana's relationship and subsequent drama to classic and modern romances including Romeo and Juliet, often using the term star-crossed lovers. In the Journal for Creativity in Mental Health, Jinnelle Veronique Aguilar discussed Brandon's ability to create interpersonal relationships in the film. She opined that Brandon wanted to create close relationships, but he could not due to his transgender status until he became close with Lana. "Although Brandon can make a brief but authentic connection with Lana, he continues to experience a sense of aloneness in the world. He consistently faces a sense of fear related to the power-over dynamics that he and others who are transsexual face…Brandon experiences the central relational paradox, in which he yearns for connection; however, due to the real threat he faces, he is unable to make that connection."

Myra Hird, in the International Feminist Journal of Politics, argued that John and Brandon exemplify two different and contrasting types of masculinity, and that Brandon's version is preferred by the film's female characters, comparing them to Arnold Schwarzenegger and Jimmy Stewart, respectively. "Throughout the film, John offers the viewer a typified narrative of heteronormative masculinity. […] Against this hegemonic masculinity, Brandon offers a masculinity reminiscent of a by-gone era of chivalry." Furthermore, she contended that John was threatened by Brandon's version of masculinity. "Gender boundaries are taken extremely seriously in Western society, and Boys Don't Cry depicts how intensely threatened John and Tom are by Brandon's superior portrayal of a masculinity 'schedule'. John cannot abide Brandon's desire, and clear ability, to access male privilege, and his reaction is to force Brandon to be female through the act of rape."

=== Causes of violence against LGBT people ===
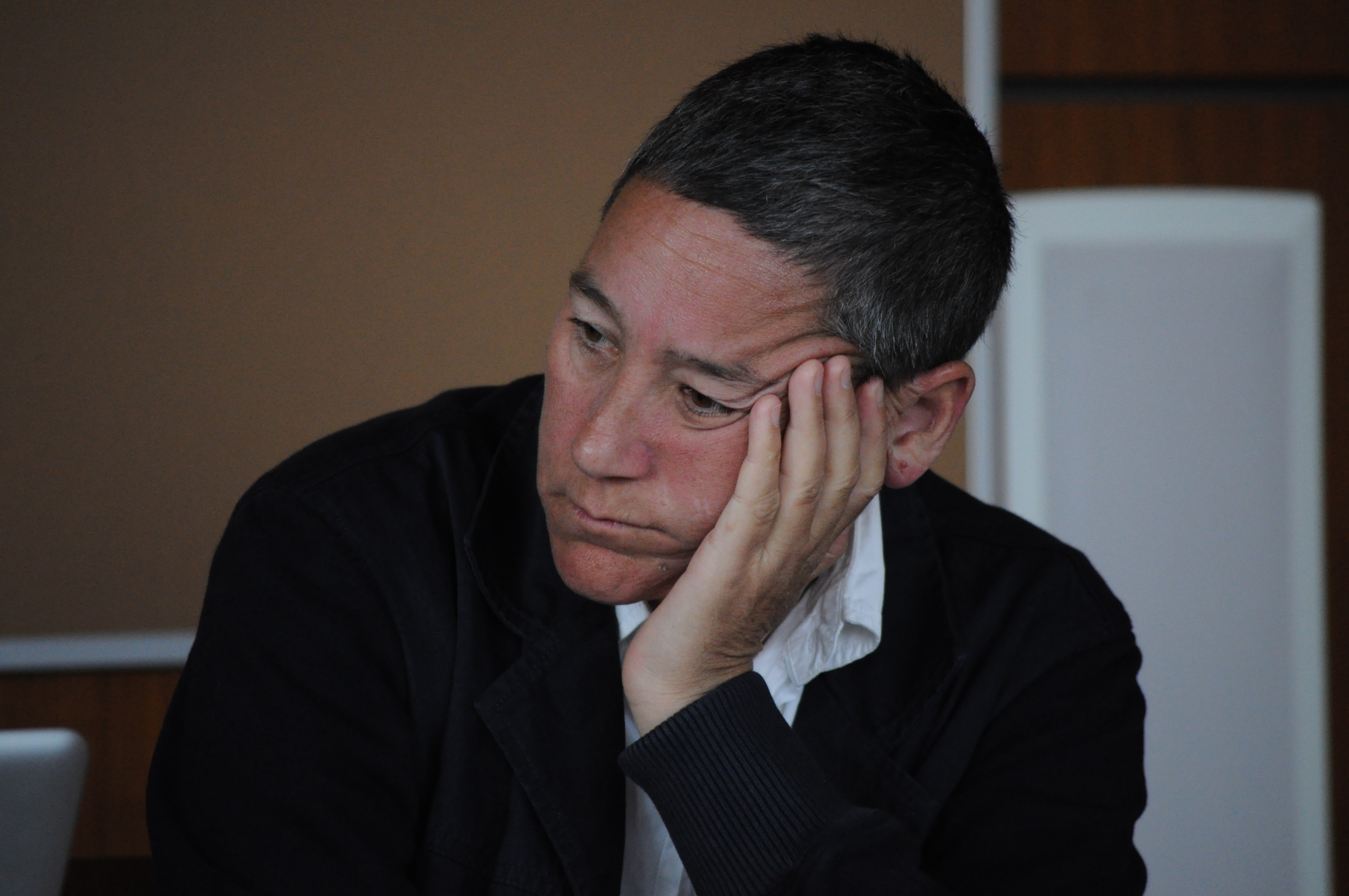
Jack Halberstam believed that Brandon's murder as depicted in the film partly arose from homophobia, not just transphobia.

Other commentators discussed the more complex psychological causes of Brandon's murder. Halberstam commented on the complicated causes of the murder, and whether it was due to transphobia or homophobia: "Ultimately in Boys [Don't Cry], the double vision of the transgender subject gives way to the universal vision of humanism, the transgender man and his lover become lesbians and the murder seems instead to be the outcome of vicious homophobic rage." Ebert called the film a "sad song about a free spirit who tried to fly a little too close to the flame".

In the same journal, Julianne Pidduck commented on the film's rape and murder scenes, "Effectively, the viewer is asked to experience the rape from the victim's point of view. The film invites political, emotional and corporeal allegiances linked to known and imagined risk, especially for female and/or queer viewers. An allegiance with Brandon's outsider status aligns the viewer with Brandon's initial exhilaration at his transgressive success as a boy, drawing us through to the film's disturbing finale."

=== Self and transgender identity ===
Many scholars addressed the various performances of gender by the characters in the film; Moss and Lynne Zeavin offered a psychoanalytic analysis, (Note: The essay uses female pronouns to refer to Brandon, which will be reserved for the purposes of quotes.) calling the film a "case report" that "presents [Brandon's] transsexual inclinations as a series of euphoric conquests" and "focuses on a range of anxious reactions to her [sic] transsexuality. […] or a case not for what they might reveal about female hysteria, but for what they might reveal about misogyny". Elaborating on the themes of the film, they wrote:

In her film, Pierce [sic] inserts the unconventional problems of transsexuality into a conventional narrative structure. Throughout the film Brandon is presented as a doomed, though beguiling and beautiful rascal, recognizably located in the lineage of well-known cinematic bad-boys like James Dean, Steve McQueen, and Paul Newman. Like these predecessors, Brandon's heroic stature derives from her [sic] unwillingness to compromise her [sic] identity … Pierce [sic] presents Brandon's struggles against biological determinism as the struggles of a dignified renegade.

Brenda Cooper, in Critical Studies in Media Communication, argued that the film "can be read as a liberatory narrative that queers the centers of heteronormativity and hegemonic masculinity by privileging female masculinity and celebrating its differences from heterosexual norms." She argued that the film challenged heteronormativity by criticizing the concept of the American Heartland, by presenting problems with heterosexual masculinity and its internalised aggression, by "centering female masculinity", and blurring gender boundaries.

Later on in the same essay, she commented that Brandon both embodied and rejected traditional masculinity, providing a new outlook on what it means to be a man which excited and thrilled the women in the film: "Brandon’s performance of masculinity, however, can be interpreted as operating on two levels in the narratives: When Brandon tries to establish his male identity with his new buddies, he imitates the kind of overly aggressive macho machismo that John and Tom represent. But Lana falls for Brandon because of his version of masculinity, which contradicts and challenges traditional assumptions about what it takes to be a man and to please a woman. Brandon’s articulation of manhood effectively mocks sexist masculine ideals and appropriates the codes of normative masculinity." Michele Aaron, in Screen, claimed that the film was primarily centered on "the spectacle of transvestism" and that the film as a whole was "a tale of passing".

Jennifer Esposito wrote that "We watch onscreen as Brandon binds his breasts, packs a dildo, fixes his hair in a mirror. His masculinity is carefully scripted. John and Tom…are never shown preparing for masculinity. They are already masculine." Melissa Rigney argued that the film defied traditional portrayals of transgender characters by not confining Brandon to certain stereotypes. "On the surface, Boys Don't Cry appears to hold the potential of rendering gender in excess: the figure of Brandon Teena can be read variously as butch, male, lesbian, transgender, transsexual, and heterosexual. […] Although female masculinity comes to the forefront in this film, I argue that the film attempts to subsume the transgressive potential of the gender outlaw within a lesbian framework and narrative, one that reduces and, ultimately, nullifies Brandon's gender and sexual excess."

In contrast, Annabelle Wilcox opined that the film primarily reinforced the gender binary by showing that "Brandon's body is branded by such rhetoric and representation, and is assumed to be a site of 'truth' that closes the question that being transgender poses for subjectivity, gender, and sexuality." She also went on to note that many film critics either disregarded Brandon's male identity or used female pronouns when referring to him. Rachel Swan, writing for Film Quarterly, wrote that Brandon's masculinity was often contrasted with Lana's femininity as a means of illustrating the two sides of the gender binary. In addition, she regarded John and Tom's rape of Brandon as an attempt to psychologically castrate him.

In another piece, Halberstam compared the media portrayal of Brandon to that of Billy Tipton, a jazz musician who no one knew was transgender until the post-mortem discovery that he was assigned female at birth. He wrote, "On some level Brandon's story, while cleaving to its own specificity, needs to remain an open narrative—not a stable narrative of FTM transsexual identity nor a singular tale of queer bashing, not a cautionary fable about the violence of rural America nor an advertisement for urban organizations of queer community; like the narrative of Billy Tipton, Brandon's story permits a dream of transformation." Christine Dando argued that "masculinity is associated with outside and femininity with interior spaces."

=== Social class and race ===
Lisa Henderson commented on the intersection between social class and gender in the film, particularly Brandon's working-class status: "My reading of Boys [Don't Cry] through the lens of class representation is not born of a univocal search for so-called positive images, but I do recoil at what appears to me to be a new instalment in a long history of popular images of working-class pathology. […] But that is not the whole story. Within this universe of feeling and reaction structured by lack and tinted blue by country lyrics and a protective and threatening night-time light, characters imbricate gender and class through their longings for love, acceptance and a better life."

Jennifer Devere Brody commented on the film's exclusion of Philip DeVine, a disabled African-American man who was another victim of the shooting. "Perhaps one can only speculate about the motivations behind this decision. But the effects are familiar ones in the history of racist representations. The erasure of DeVine from the narrative places the white female bodies as the only true victims of crime; and the film's inability to show DeVine as violated rather than violator perpetuates the myth of the black man as always already a perpetrator of crime." Regarding DeVine, Halberstam wrote, "Peirce perhaps thought that her film, already running close to two hours, could not handle another subplot, but the story of Philip DeVine is important and it is a crucial part of the drama of gender, race, sexuality, and class that was enacted in the heartland. Race is not incidental to this narrative of mostly white, Midwestern small towns and by omitting DeVine's story from Boys Don't Cry, Peirce contributes to the detachment of transgender narratives from narratives about race, consigning the memory of DeVine to oblivion."

=== Culture of the Midwestern United States ===
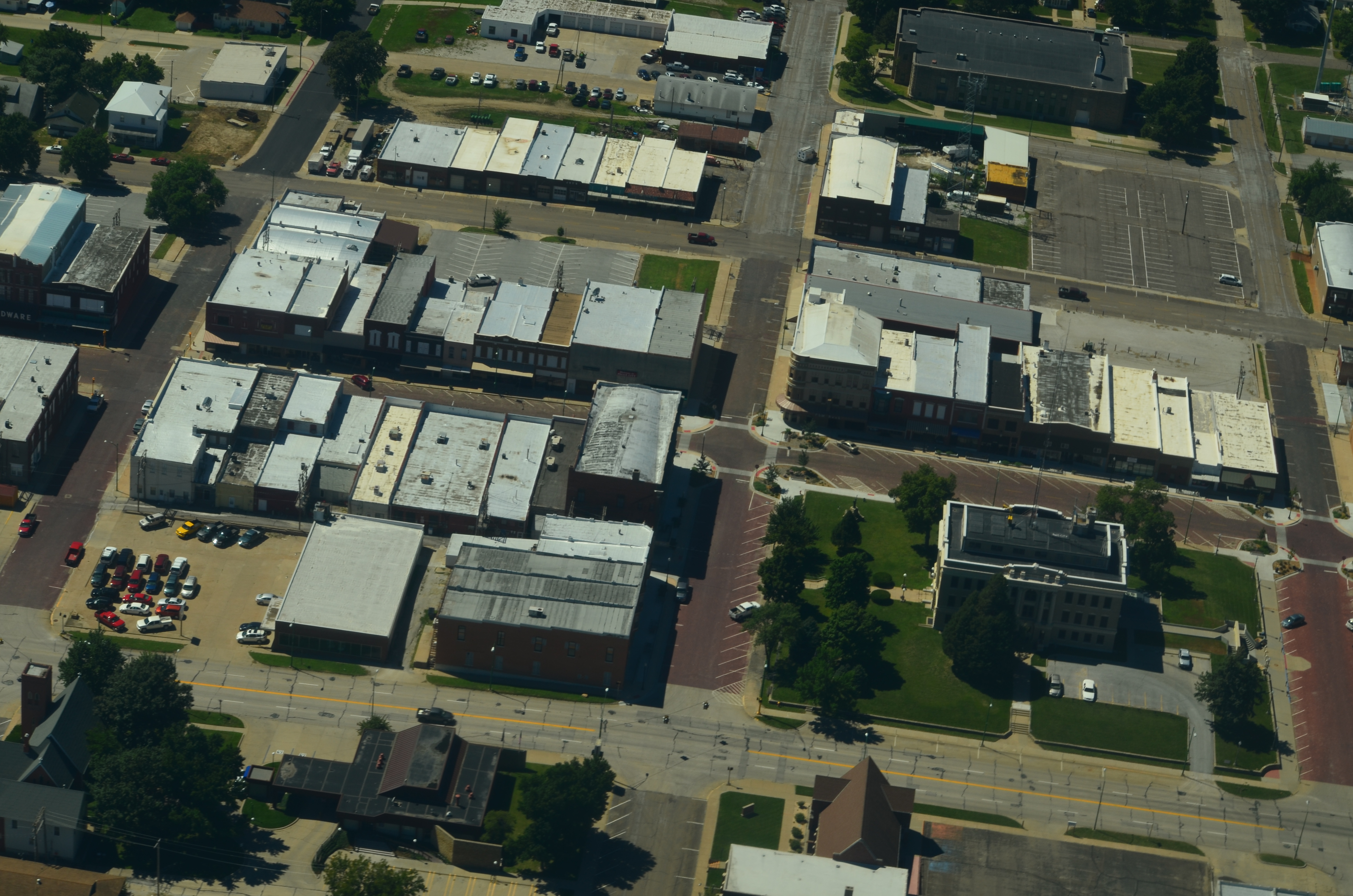
The film's portrayal of Falls City, Nebraska, as well as the Great Plains generally, provoked discussion among commentators.

Several authors commented on the possible impact that the film's setting of Falls City, Nebraska, located in the Midwestern United States, could have had on the film's plot. Maslin called Boys Don't Cry a tale of a trapped, small town character's search for life beyond the rural existence and the high price he pays for his view of the American Dream. Regarding the film's portrayal of Nebraska, Halberstam wrote, "The landscape of Nebraska then serves as a contested site upon which multiple narratives unfold, narratives indeed which refuse to collapse into simply one story. Some of these narratives are narratives of hate, some of desire; others tell of ignorance and brutality; still others of isolation and fear; some allow violence and ignorant prejudices to become the essence of white poor rural identity; still others provoke questions about the deployment of whiteness and the regulation of violence."

Christina Dando wrote that the typical portrayal of the Midwest as a "frontier" area did not come through in the film until the setting switched from Lincoln to Falls City: "The flat landscape, the spacious sky, the home, evoke two different Plains time periods familiar to many Americans through historic photographs: the early settlement process…and 1930s Farm Security Administration photographs. It is virtually timeless. There is also a sense of both place and placelessness. While the landscape is distinctively Plains, it could be described as nowhere."

She went on to argue that the setting is not only conveyed visually, but also through the characters' homes. "While there is no trailer park in Falls City, Brandon's community there occupies the margin: Candace and Lana's homes appear to be on the outskirts of town, or even outside of town. There are no complete families, only the family that that has been created. The men appear to have no homes, relationally or physically: none are shown to have a family. Speaking about the film's cinematography and the relation to its themes:

The Plains frontier landscape as it is constructed in Boys Don't Cry is dark, literally and figuratively. Most of the scenes are set at night, utilizing night Plains skies with time-lapse clouds, heightening the isolation. Film frames of placeless and timeless. The community also is dark. It is marginal, just managing to get along, and in the end deadly. While the classic Western dichotomy of men associated with exteriors and women with interiors is apparent, so too is Brandon's border-crossing. He appears to be able to easily handle both landscapes, yet belongs to neither.

Dando compared the film to other tragic books and films that have been set on the Great Plains, including My Ántonia, Giants in the Earth, The Grapes of Wrath, In Cold Blood, and Badlands, writing that unlike the other works, "Brandon is [a] character who truly crosses frontiers."

Writing for The Brooklyn Rail in 2025, Charles Switzer wrote, "Nebraska’s Falls City becomes a character as the myopic brains of John (Peter Sarsgaard) and Tom (Brendan Sexton III), the two ex-convicts who befriend and later brutalize Brandon, and even Lana’s mother, Linda (Jeannetta Arnette), are allowed to fester in its near-nomadic desolation. It is a land filled with shift work, unerotic procreation, substance abuse, and Jesus chic,"

== Release and reception ==
=== Premiere and commercial performance ===
Boys Don't Cry aired in Canada at the Toronto International Film Festival (TIFF) in September 1999. It premiered in the U.S. at the New York Film Festival on October 8, 1999, to critical acclaim. It was shown at the Reel Affirmations International Gay and Lesbian Film Festival in early October, where it won further praise and appeared at the Venice International Film Festival. Boys Don't Cry was given a special screening in snippets at the Sundance Film Festival. At that time, the film was still called Take It Like a Man. The film received a limited release theatrically on October 22, 1999, in the U.S., where it was distributed by Fox Searchlight Pictures, a subsidiary of Twentieth Century Fox that specializes in independent films. Initially, many viewers complained via email to Peirce that the film was not being shown near them, as the film was only being shown on 25 screens across the country. However, this number increased to nearly 200 by March 2000. The film grossed $73,720 in its opening week. By December 5, the film had grossed in excess of $2 million. By May 2000, it had a U.S. total gross of $11,540,607—more than three times its production budget. Internationally, the film was released on March 2, 2000, in Australia and on April 9, 2000, in the United Kingdom.

=== Critical response ===
Critics lauded Boys Don't Cry upon its release, with many calling it one of the best films of 1999. Review aggregator Rotten Tomatoes reports 91% of 85 professional critics gave the film a positive review, with an average rating of 7.90/10; the site's consensus states, "Harrowing yet stirring, Boys Don't Cry powerfully commemorates the life -- and brutally unjust death -- of transgender teen Brandon Teena". Another review aggregator, Metacritic, gave the film an 86 out of 100 based on 33 reviews, indicating "universal acclaim". One reviewer said the film was a "critical knockout".

Critics often praised the performances by Swank and Sevigny; Peter Travers said the pair "give performances that burn in the memory", and The Film Stage termed Swank's performance "one of the greatest" Best Actress Oscar-winning performances. Peter Stack of the San Francisco Chronicle lauded the lead acting performances of Swank, Sevigny, Saarsgard, and Sexton III, writing, "It may be the best-acted film of the year". Online film reviewer James Berardinelli gave the film three and a half stars out of four; he highlighted the performances of Swank and Sevigny as the film's greatest success and likened the film's intensity to that of a train wreck. Berardinelli wrote that Swank "gives the performance of her career" and that "Sevigny's performance is more conventional than Swank's, but no less effective. She provides the counterbalance to the tide of hatred that drowns the last act of the film." Emanuel Levy of Variety called the acting "flawless" and concluded that the "stunningly accomplished" and "candid" film could be "seen as a Rebel Without a Cause for these culturally diverse and complex times, with the two misfits enacting a version of the James Dean—Natalie Wood romance with utmost conviction, searching, like their '50s counterparts, for love, self-worth and a place to call home". Stephen Hunter of The Washington Post said the performances are of such "luminous humanity that they break your heart". Premiere listed Swank's performance as one of the "100 Greatest Performances of All Time". Owen Gleiberman of Entertainment Weekly called Swank a "revelation" and wrote, "by the end, her Brandon/Teena is beyond male or female. It's as if we were simply glimpsing the character's soul, in all its yearning and conflicted beauty."

Other reviewers were positive towards the way Boys Don't Cry portrayed its subject matter. Roger Ebert of the Chicago Sun-Times listed Boys Don't Cry as one of the five best films of 1999, saying, "This could have been a clinical movie of the week, but instead it's a sad song about a free spirit who tried to fly a little too close to the flame". Janet Maslin of The New York Times said the film was "stunning" and gave it four stars out of four stars. Maslin said, "unlike most films about mind-numbing tragedy, this one manages to be full of hope". Kenneth Turan of the Los Angeles Times praised the lack of romanticization and dramatization of the characters, and wrote, "Peirce and Bienen and the expert cast engage us in the actuality of these rootless, hopeless, stoned-out lives without sentimentalizing or romanticizing them" and that "Boys Don't Cry is an exceptional—and exceptionally disturbing film". Mike Clarke of USA Today commended Peirce's depth of knowledge of the case and the subject matter, writing, "Peirce seems to have researched her subject with grad-school-thesis intensity".

Jay Carr of The Boston Globe wrote, "Boys Don't Cry not only revisits the crime, but convinces us we're being taken inside it". Stephanie Zacharek of Salon gave a positive review, singling out the directing and acting. She wrote, "Peirce ... covers an extraordinary amount of territory, not just in terms of dealing with Brandon’s sexual-identity and self-fulfillment issues, but also in trying to understand the lives of those around him". Zacharek described Swank's performance as "a continual revelation" and Sevigny's performance as "transformative". She said, "When Brandon dies, Boys Don’t Cry reaches an emotional intensity that’s almost operatic. The saddest thing, though, is seeing Sevigny’s Lana crumpled over his corpse—the way she plays it, you know that when Brandon went, he took a part of her with him, too". David Edelstein of Slate was also very positive towards the film, calling it "a meditation on the irrelevance of gender." He went on to praise Swank, Sevigny, and Sarsgaard in their roles, especially Sevigny, writing that she "keeps the movie tantalizing".

The film was not without detractors, who focused on the film's portrayal of Brandon and his actions. Richard Corliss of Time magazine was one of the film's negative reviewers; he wrote, "the film lets down the material. It's too cool: all attitude, no sizzle". Peter Rainer of New York Magazine compared the film unfavorably with Rebel Without a Cause (1954), calling it a "transgendered [sic]" version, elaborating that the film "could have used a tougher and more exploratory spirit; for Peirce, there was no cruelty, no derangement in Brandon's impostures toward the unsuspecting," the review repeatedly misgendering Brandon and negatively focusing on him being transgender and the claim that he misled people despite his girlfriend in the film accepting him for who he was. In 2007, Premiere ranked the film on its list of "The 25 Most Dangerous Movies".

The film was generally well-received by the LGBT community. Boys Don't Cry's release came a year after the murder of a homosexual teenager, Matthew Shepard, which occurred October 12, 1998. The murder sparked additional public interest in hate crime legislation in America and in Brandon Teena, and increased public interest in Boys Don't Cry. Cooper wrote that Boys Don't Cry "is perhaps the only film addressing the issue of female masculinity by a self-described queer filmmaker to reach mainstream audiences and to receive critical acclaim and prestigious awards." However, Noelle Howey, writing for Mother Jones, wrote that despite the critical acclaim, relatively few critics understood what she perceived as the main point of the film—Brandon being a victim of trans bashing. Howey said, "Even a cursory glance at reviews of Boys Don't Cry reveals that while most critics admired the film, few absorbed its main point: that Brandon Teena was a biological girl who felt innately that she was a man. Most of the media instead cast Teena as a Yentl for the new millennium, rather than a victim of anti-transgender bigotry."

More recently, some have criticized the film's casting of a cisgender woman (Swank) for the role of a trans man (Brandon Teena), such as during a 2016 protest at a Reed College screening of the film. In 2019, Swank stated in an interview for IndieWire: "I’m happy that times are evolving and changing and that people are getting the opportunity to tell their own stories.”

==== Factual accuracy ====
The accuracy of Boys Don't Cry was disputed by real-life people involved in the murder. The real Lana Tisdel declared her dislike for the film; she said Brandon never proposed to her and that when she discovered Brandon was transgender, she ended the relationship. Tisdel disliked the way she was portrayed in the film, and called the film the "second murder of Brandon Teena". Before the film's theatrical release, Lana Tisdel sued the film's producers, claiming that the film depicted her as "lazy, white trash and a skanky snake" and that her family and friends had come to see her as "a lesbian who did nothing to stop a murder". Tisdel settled her lawsuit against Fox Searchlight for an undisclosed sum. Sarah Nissen, cousin of murderer Marvin Nissen, was also critical of the film, saying, "There's none of it that's right. It was just weird." Leslie Tisdel, Lana's sister, called the film "a lie of a movie".

Lana Tisdel's potential involvement in the rape and murder of Brandon Teena was also highlighted. Various people involved in the case, particularly Brandon's family, have alleged that Tisdel was somehow involved with the murders, or had at least set them up in an act of vengeance. Perhaps the most notable admission about Tisdel's motives came from Tom Nissen, who infamously confessed that Tisdel was present at the time of the murders in the car and had even tried knocking on the door of the farmhouse where Brandon, Lambert, and DeVine were staying.

=== Awards and nominations ===
The film won a variety of awards, most of which went to Swank for her performance. Swank won a Best Actress Oscar while Sevigny received a nomination in the category of Best Supporting Actress. From the Hollywood Foreign Press, the film received two Golden Globe nominations in the same two categories (Best Actress, Best Supporting Actress) for Swank and Sevigny, winning Best Actress. Swank and Sevigny both received Best Actress Awards from the New York Film Critics Circle, the Chicago Film Critics Association Awards and an Independent Spirit Award. The film won three awards at the Boston Society of Film Critics Awards: Best Actress (Swank), Best Supporting Actress (Sevigny) and Best Director (Peirce). Swank and Sevigny won Satellite Awards for their performances, and the film was nominated in two categories; Best Picture (Drama) and Best Director. It was named one of the best films of the year by the National Board of Review of Motion Pictures.

The family of Brandon Teena criticized Swank for her repeated use of the male gender pronoun "he" in her Oscar acceptance speech. Teena's mother JoAnn Brandon said her child's transgender identity was a defense mechanism that was developed in response to childhood sexual abuse, rather than being an expression of Teena's gendered sense of self. JoAnn said, "She pretended she was a man so no other man could touch her". Despite the criticism, Kevin O'Keeffe, writing for Out, defended Swank's acceptance speech; he said, "Swank deserves a place in the great acceptance speech canon for being bold, not only as an actress, but as an award winner".

=== Rating and home media ===
Boys Don't Cry garnered significant attention for its graphic rape scene. The film was initially assigned an NC-17 rating from the Motion Picture Association of America (MPAA); the content was toned down for the U.S. release, where it was rated R. Peirce was interviewed for a 2005 documentary titled This Film Is Not Yet Rated, which discussed the film's problems with the MPAA, particularly the censoring of the sex scenes. The portrayal of a double rape caused significant problems with the MPAA and had to be trimmed to avoid the NC-17 rating. Both the Australian and European version are more explicit, particularly the first rape. Peirce was angry because the MPAA wanted the sex scene between Brandon and Lana removed but was satisfied with the level of brutality in the murder scene. She also claimed that one objection from the MPAA was that one scene featured an orgasm that was "too long", and rhetorically asked if anyone had ever been hurt by an orgasm that was too long. The film is rated 18 by the British Board of Film Classification.

Boys Don't Cry was first released on home video by Fox Searchlight Pictures in September 2000 as part of a "Premiere Series", preceded by a DVD release in April 2000 in the United States and Canada. The DVD's special features included a commentary by Kimberly Peirce and a behind-the-scenes featurette containing interviews with Peirce, Swank and Sevigny; there was also a theatrical trailer and three television trailers. This same edition was re-released in 2009 with different cover art. The film was released on Blu-ray on February 16, 2011, by 20th Century Fox Entertainment in conjunction with Fox Pathé Europa.

== See also ==
- A Girl Like Me: The Gwen Araujo Story (2006)
- Soldier's Girl (2003)
- Gender dysphoria
- Trans bashing
- New Queer Cinema
- Transgender in film and television
