= Hilary Swank filmography =

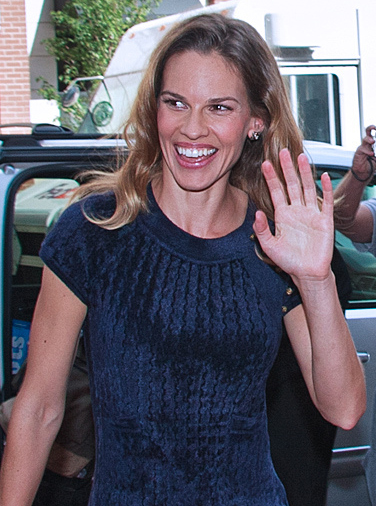
Swank attending the 2010 Toronto International Film Festival

Hilary Swank is an American actress and film producer. She began acting in 1991, appearing in the sitcoms Evening Shade (1991), Growing Pains (1991–1992), and Camp Wilder (1992–1993). This was followed by roles in Fran Rubel Kuzui's Buffy the Vampire Slayer (1992) and Christopher Cain's The Next Karate Kid (1994), the series Beverly Hills, 90210 (1997–1998), and a number of television film credits. Her breakthrough came with her portrayal of Brandon Teena, a transgender murder victim, in Kimberly Peirce's Boys Don't Cry (1999), winning the Academy Award and Golden Globe for Best Actress. Boys Don't Cry later became Swank's first film selected for preservation in the National Film Registry by the Library of Congress.

Swank's output of the early 2000s include supporting roles in Sam Raimi's The Gift (2000) and Christopher Nolan's Insomnia (2002), as well as headlining Katja von Garnier's Iron Jawed Angels (2004). She earned acclaim for portraying a female boxer in Clint Eastwood's Million Dollar Baby (2004), winning her second Academy Award and Golden Globe for Best Actress, as well as the Screen Actors Guild Award for Best Actress. She found continued commercial success with leading roles in Richard LaGravenese's films Freedom Writers (2007) and P.S. I Love You (2007). She received a star on the Hollywood Walk of Fame in 2007.

After a period of critical fluctuations, Swank appeared in well-received films such as Tommy Lee Jones' The Homesman (2014), Steven Soderbergh's Logan Lucky (2017), Elizabeth Chomko's What They Had (2018), Grant Sputore's I Am Mother (2019), and Jon Gunn's Ordinary Angels (2024). She returned to television with starring roles in the series Trust (2018), Away (2020), and Alaska Daily (2022–2023), the last two of which she executive-produced.

== Film ==
Key
†	Denotes films that have not yet been released

List of Hilary Swank film credits
Year	Title	Role	Notes	Ref.
1992	Buffy the Vampire Slayer	Kimberly Hannah		
1994	The Next Karate Kid	Julie Pierce		
1996	Sometimes They Come Back... Again	Michelle Porter		
1996	Kounterfeit	Colleen		
1997	Quiet Days in Hollywood	Lolita		
1998	Heartwood	Sylvia Orsini		
1999	Boys Don't Cry	Brandon Teena		
2000	The Gift	Valerie Barksdale		
2000	The Audition	—N/a	Short film	
2001	The Affair of the Necklace	Jeanne St. Rémy de Valois		
2002	Insomnia	Detective Ellie Burr		
2002	The Space Between	—N/a	Short film	
2003	11:14	"Buzzy"		
2003	The Core	Major Rebecca "Beck" Childs		
2004	Red Dust	Sarah Barcant		
2004	Million Dollar Baby	Mary Margaret "Maggie Mo Cuishle" Fitzgerald		
2006	The Black Dahlia	Madeleine Linscott		
2006	...So Goes the Nation	Herself	Documentary film	
2007	Freedom Writers	Erin Gruwell		
2007	The Reaping	Katherine Winter		
2007	A Place in Time	Herself	Documentary film	
2007	P. S. I Love You	Holly Kennedy		
2008	Birds of America	Laura		
2009	Amelia	Amelia Earhart	Also executive producer	
2010	Conviction	Betty Anne Waters	Also executive producer	
2011	The Resident	Dr. Juliet Devereau		
2011	Something Borrowed	—N/a	Producer	
2011	New Year's Eve	Claire Morgan		
2014	The Homesman	Mary Bee Cuddy		
2014	You're Not You	Kate Parker	Also producer	
2015	Lauda: The Untold Story	Herself	Documentary film	
2016	Spark	The Queen (voice)		
2017	Logan Lucky	Sarah Grayson		
2017	55 Steps	Colette Hughes		
2018	What They Had	Bridget Ertz	Also executive producer	
2019	I Am Mother	Woman		
2020	The Hunt	Athena Stone		
2020	Fatale	Detective Valerie Quinlan		
2023	The Good Mother	Marissa Bennings		
2024	Ordinary Angels	Sharon Stevens		

== Television ==
List of Hilary Swank television credits
Year	Title	Role	Notes	Ref.
1991	Evening Shade	Aimee Thompson	4 episodes	
1991–1992	Growing Pains	Sasha Serotsky	2 episodes	
1992–1993	Camp Wilder	Danielle	19 episodes	
1994	Cries Unheard: The Donna Yaklich Story	Patty Yaklich	Television film	
1996	Terror in the Family	Deena Marten	Television film	
1997	Dying to Belong	Lisa Connors	Television film	
1997	The Sleepwalker Killing	Lauren Schall	Television film	
1997	Leaving L.A.	Tiffany Roebuck	6 episodes	
1997–1998	Beverly Hills, 90210	Carly Reynolds	16 episodes	
2004	Iron Jawed Angels	Alice Paul	Television film	
2013	Mary and Martha	Mary Morgan	Television film	
2018	Trust	Gail Getty	Main role	
2019–2020	BoJack Horseman	Joey Pogo	Voice role; 5 episodes	
2020	Away	Emma Green	Main role; also executive producer	
2022–2023	Alaska Daily	Eileen Fitzgerald	Main role; also executive producer	
2025	Yellowjackets	Adult Melissa	2 episodes	

== See also ==
- List of awards and nominations received by Hilary Swank
