= List of awards and nominations received by Hilary Swank =

Hilary Swank awards and nominations
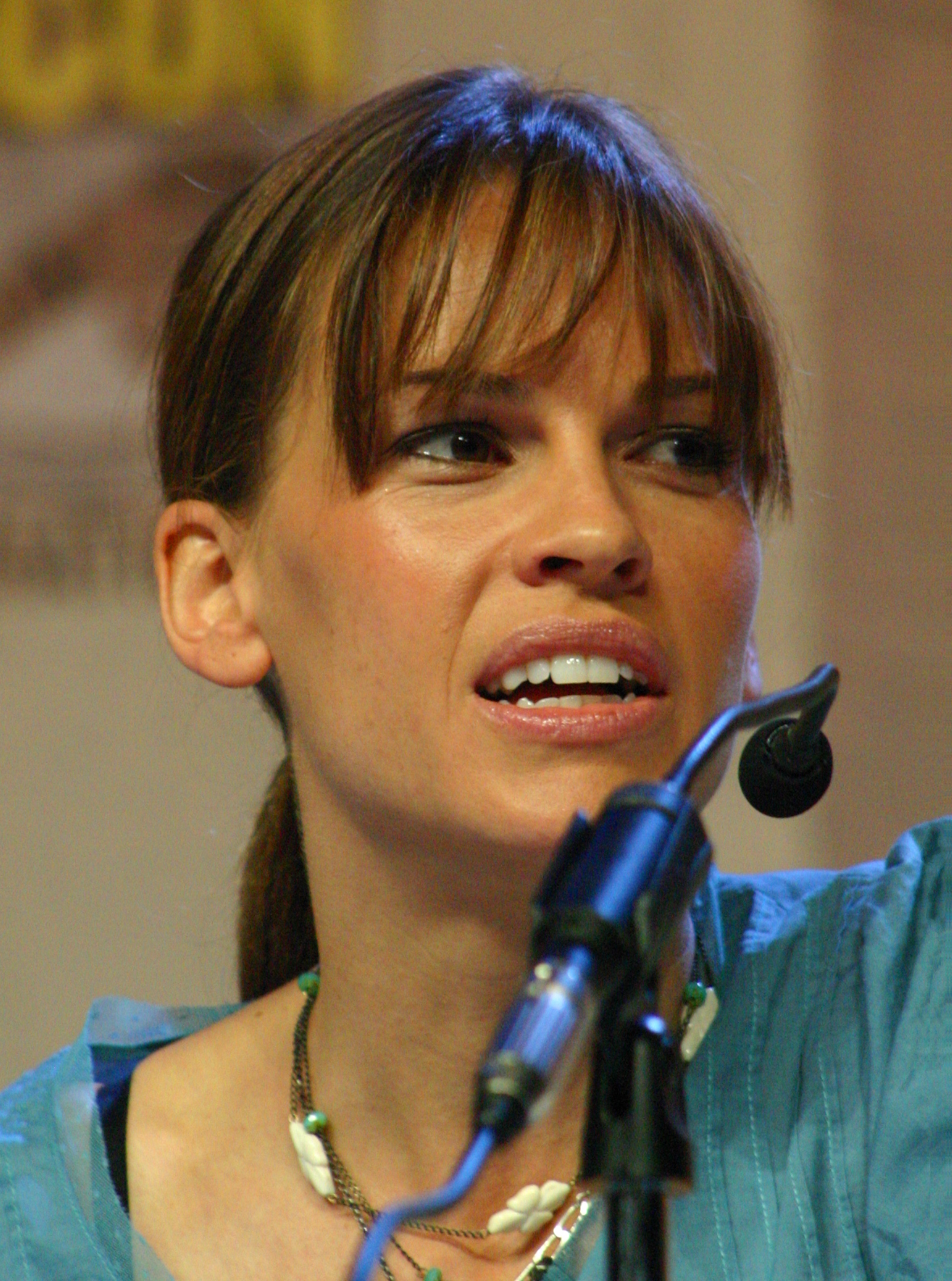
- Swank at the 2006 San Diego Comic-Con
Awards and nominations
| Award | Wins | Nominations |
| Academy Awards | 2 | 2 |
| Actor Awards | 1 | 5 |
| BAFTA Awards | 0 | 1 |
| Critics' Choice Awards | 2 | 5 |
| Golden Globe Awards | 2 | 4 |

Totals (Note: Certain award groups do not simply award one winner. They acknowledge several different recipients, have runners-up, and have third place. Since this is a specific recognition and is different from losing an award, runner-up mentions are considered wins in this award tally. For simplification and to avoid errors, each award in this list has been presumed to have had a prior nomination.)
- Wins: 41
- Nominations: 73

The following is a list of awards and nominations received by American actress Hilary Swank.

== Major associations ==
=== Academy Awards ===
| Year | Category | Nominated work | Result | Ref. |
|---|---|---|---|---|
| 2000 | Best Actress | Boys Don't Cry | Won | |
| 2005 | Best Actress | Million Dollar Baby | Won | |

=== Actor Awards ===
| Year | Category | Nominated work | Result | Ref. |
|---|---|---|---|---|
| 2000 | Outstanding Female Actor in a Leading Role | Boys Don't Cry | Nominated | |
| 2005 | Outstanding Female Actor in a Leading Role | Million Dollar Baby | Won | |
| 2005 | Outstanding Cast in a Motion Picture | Million Dollar Baby | Nominated (Note: Shared with the cast) | |
| 2005 | Outstanding Female Actor in a Miniseries or Television Movie | Iron Jawed Angels | Nominated | |
| 2011 | Outstanding Female Actor in a Leading Role | Conviction | Nominated | |

=== BAFTA Awards ===
| Year | Category | Nominated work | Result | Ref. |
British Academy Film Awards
| 2001 | Best Actress in a Leading Role | Boys Don't Cry | Nominated | |

=== Critics' Choice Awards ===
| Year | Category | Nominated work | Result | Ref. |
Film
| 2000 | Best Actress | Boys Don't Cry | Won | |
| 2005 | Best Actress | Million Dollar Baby | Won | |
Super Awards
| 2021 | Best Actress in an Action Movie | The Hunt | Nominated | |
| 2021 | Best Villain in a Movie | The Hunt | Nominated | |
| 2021 | Best Actress in a Science Fiction/Fantasy Series | Away | Nominated | |

=== Golden Globe Awards ===
| Year | Category | Nominated work | Result | Ref. |
|---|---|---|---|---|
| 2000 | Best Actress in a Motion Picture - Drama | Boys Don't Cry | Won | |
| 2005 | Best Actress in a Motion Picture - Drama | Million Dollar Baby | Won | |
| 2005 | Best Actress - Miniseries or Television Film | Iron Jawed Angels | Nominated | |
| 2023 | Best Actress - Television Series Drama | Alaska Daily | Nominated | |

== Other awards ==
=== Gotham Awards ===
| Year | Category | Nominated work | Result | Ref. |
|---|---|---|---|---|
| 2010 | Tribute Award | —N/a | Honored | |

=== Independent Spirit Awards ===
| Year | Category | Nominated work | Result | Ref. |
|---|---|---|---|---|
| 2000 | Best Female Lead | Boys Don't Cry | Won | |

=== Irish Film & Television Awards ===
| Year | Category | Nominated work | Result | Ref. |
|---|---|---|---|---|
| 2008 | Best International Actress | P.S. I Love You | Won | |

=== MTV Movie & TV Awards ===
| Year | Category | Nominated work | Result | Ref. |
|---|---|---|---|---|
| 2000 | Best Breakthrough Performance | Boys Don't Cry | Nominated | |
| 2000 | Best Kiss | Boys Don't Cry | Nominated (Note: Shared with Chloë Sevigny.) | |
| 2005 | Best Female Performance | Million Dollar Baby | Nominated | |

=== National Board of Review ===
| Year | Category | Nominated work | Result | Ref. |
|---|---|---|---|---|
| 2000 | Breakthrough Performance - Female | Boys Don't Cry | Won | |

=== Satellite Awards ===
| Year | Category | Nominated work | Result | Ref. |
|---|---|---|---|---|
| 2000 | Best Actress in a Motion Picture - Drama | Boys Don't Cry | Won | |
| 2005 | Best Actress in a Motion Picture - Drama | Million Dollar Baby | Won | |

== Other associations ==
| Award | Year | Category | Nominated work | Result | Ref. |
|---|---|---|---|---|---|
| Astra Television Awards | 2025 | Best Guest Actress in a Drama Series | Yellowjackets | Won | |
| Boston Society of Film Critics | 1999 | Best Actress | Boys Don't Cry | Won | |
| Boston Society of Film Critics | 2004 | Best Actress | Million Dollar Baby | Won | |
| Boston Society of Film Critics | 2014 | Best Actress | The Homesman | Runner-up | |
| Chicago Film Critics Association | 2000 | Best Actress | Boys Don't Cry | Won | |
| Chicago International Film Festival | 1999 | Best Actress | Boys Don't Cry | Won | |
| Chlotrudis Awards | 2000 | Best Actress | Boys Don't Cry | Won | |
| Dallas–Fort Worth Film Critics Association | 2000 | Best Actress | Boys Don't Cry | Won | |
| Dallas–Fort Worth Film Critics Association | 2005 | Best Actress | Million Dollar Baby | Won | |
| Empire Awards | 2001 | Best Actress | Boys Don't Cry | Nominated | |
| Empire Awards | 2003 | Best Actress | Insomnia | Nominated | |
| Empire Awards | 2006 | Best Actress | Million Dollar Baby | Nominated | |
| Florida Film Critics Circle | 2000 | Best Actress | Boys Don't Cry | Won | |
| Florida Film Critics Circle | 2004 | Best Actress | Million Dollar Baby | Won | |
| Cairo International Film Festival | 2017 | Lifetime Achievement Award | —N/a | Honored | |
| Giffoni Film Festival | 2011 | François Truffaut Award | —N/a | Honored | |
| Gijón International Film Festival | 1999 | Best Actress | Boys Don't Cry | Won | |
| Jupiter Awards | 2006 | Best International Actress | Million Dollar Baby | Won | |
| Jupiter Awards | 2016 | Best International Actress | You're Not You | Nominated | |
| Las Vegas Film Critics Society | 1999 | Best Actress | Boys Don't Cry | Won | |
| Las Vegas Film Critics Society | 1999 | Most Promising Actress | Boys Don't Cry | Won | |
| Locarno Film Festival | 2019 | Leopard Club Award | —N/a | Honored | |
| London Film Critics' Circle | 2001 | Actress of the Year | Boys Don't Cry | Nominated | |
| Los Angeles Film Critics Association | 2000 | Best Actress | Boys Don't Cry | Won | |
| National Society of Film Critics | 2000 | Best Actress | Boys Don't Cry | 2nd place | |
| National Society of Film Critics | 2005 | Best Actress | Million Dollar Baby | Won (Note: Tied with Imelda Staunton for Vera Drake.) | |
| New York Film Critics Circle | 2000 | Best Actress | Boys Don't Cry | Won | |
| Online Film Critics Society | 2000 | Best Actress | Boys Don't Cry | Nominated | |
| Online Film Critics Society | 2005 | Best Actress | Million Dollar Baby | Nominated | |
| Online Film & Television Association | 2000 | Best Actress | Boys Don't Cry | Won | |
| Online Film & Television Association | 2004 | Best Actress in a Motion Picture or Miniseries | Iron Jawed Angels | Nominated | |
| Online Film & Television Association | 2005 | Best Actress | Million Dollar Baby | Won | |
| Online Film & Television Association | 2021 | Best Actress in a Drama Series | Away | Nominated | |
| Phoenix Film Critics Society | 2004 | Best Actress | Million Dollar Baby | Won | |
| Phoenix Film Critics Society | 2014 | Best Actress | The Homesman | Nominated | |
| San Diego Film Critics Society | 2014 | Best Actress | The Homesman | Nominated | |
| Sant Jordi Awards | 2006 | Best Foreign Actress | Million Dollar Baby | Won | |
| Saturn Awards | 2001 | Best Supporting Actress | The Gift | Nominated | |
| St. Louis Film Critics Association | 2005 | Best Actress | Million Dollar Baby | Won | |
| Teen Choice Awards | 2000 | Choice Breakout Movie Star | Boys Don't Cry | Nominated | |
| Toronto Film Critics Association | 1999 | Best Actress | Boys Don't Cry | Won | |
| Utah Film Critics Association Awards | 2004 | Best Actress | Million Dollar Baby | Won | |
| Vancouver Film Critics Circle | 2005 | Best Actress | Million Dollar Baby | Nominated | |
| Village Voice Film Poll | 1999 | Best Lead Performance | Boys Don't Cry | Won | |
| Washington D.C. Area Film Critics Association | 2004 | Best Actress | Million Dollar Baby | Nominated | |
| Women Film Critics Circle | 2014 | Courage in Acting Award | The Homesman | Nominated | |
| Women Film Critics Circle | 2014 | Invisible Woman Award | The Homesman | Nominated | |
| Women Film Critics Circle | 2014 | Best Ensemble Cast | The Homesman | Won | |
| Women's Image Network Awards | 2009 | Outstanding Actress | Amelia | Nominated | |
| Young Artist Awards | 1993 | Best Young Actress in a New Television Series | Camp Wilder | Nominated | |
| YoungStar Awards | 1995 | Best Performance by a Young Actress in a Miniseries/Made-for-TV Movie | Cries Unheard: The Donna Yaklich Story | Nominated | |

== See also ==
- Hilary Swank filmography
