= Conviction (disambiguation) =

Conviction is a finding that a defendant is guilty of committing a crime.

Conviction may also refer to:

== Law and ethics ==
- Conviction and execution of Steven Michael Woods Jr.
- Conviction and exoneration of Glenn Ford
- Conviction of Michael Shields
- Conviction politics
- Conviction rate
- Moral conviction: a belief to which a person attaches moral significance

== Arts, entertainment, and media ==
=== Films ===
- Conviction (2002 film), a 2002 film about the life of Carl Upchurch
- Conviction (2010 film), a 2010 film about the life of Betty Anne Waters
- The Conviction, a 1991 Italian film

=== Games ===
- Tom Clancy's Splinter Cell: Conviction, the fifth game in the Splinter Cell series

=== Literature ===
- Conviction (Patterson novel), a 2004 novel by American author Richard North Patterson
- Conviction (play), a play by Eve Ensler
- Conviction (Star Wars novel), a 2011 Star Wars novel by Aaron Allston
- Conviction, a novel by Ann Hatton

=== Music ===
- Convictions (band), an American Christian metalcore band from Ohio
- Conviction (Aiden album), 2007
- Conviction (Signal Aout 42 album)
- Conviction (The Crimson Armada album), 2011
- Conviction (UT album), 1986

=== Television ===
==== Shows ====
- Conviction (2004 TV series), a 2004 BBC crime television drama in 6 parts
- Conviction (2006 TV series), a 2006 American television drama series that aired on NBC
- Conviction (2016 TV series), a 2016 American television legal drama series that aired on ABC
- Stephen (TV series), also titled Conviction: The Case of Stephen Lawrence, 2021 British TV miniseries

==== Episodes ====
- "Conviction" (Angel), a 2003 episode of the TV series Angel
- "Convictions" (Babylon 5), a 1995 episode of the science fiction TV series Babylon 5

== See also ==
- Convict
- Convicted (disambiguation)
