= Andrew Windsor =

Andrew Windsor may refer to:

== People ==
- Andrew Windsor, 1st Baron Windsor (1467–1543), English member of parliament
- Andrew Windsor, 7th Earl of Plymouth (1764–1837), successor of Other Windsor, 6th Earl of Plymouth
- Andrew Mountbatten-Windsor (born 1960), second son of Elizabeth II
- Andrew Windsor, gold finalist of the Welsh National Road Race Championships in 2002

== Other uses ==
- Chief Superintendent Andrew Windsor, a character in The Contractor (2007 film)
