= Eyes of a Child =

Eyes of a Child may refer to:

- "Eyes of a Child" (The Moody Blues song), a song in two parts by The Moody Blues from the 1969 album To Our Children's Children's Children
- "Eyes of a Child", a song by En Vogue from the 1997 album EV3
- "Eyes of a Child", a song by Soul Asylum from the 1995 album Let Your Dim Light Shine
- "Eyes of a Child", a song by Michael McDonald from the film South Park: Bigger, Longer & Uncut
- "Eyes of a Child", a song by Steve Morse from the 1996 album StressFest
- Eyes of a Child (novel), a novel by Richard North Patterson

== See also ==
- "Eyes of the Child", a 1993 song by Debbie Gibson
- "Through the Eyes of a Child", a 2008 song by Reamonn
