= Josef Rusnak =

German film director

- Born: 25 November 1958 (age 67); Vakhshstroy, Tajik SSR, Soviet Union (now Tajikistan)
- Occupations: Film director, screenwriter
- Years active: 1984–present

Josef Rusnak (born 25 November 1958) is a German screenwriter and director.

== Personal life ==
Rusnak was born on 25 November 1958 in Vakhshstroy, Tajik SSR, Soviet Union, into a German family. His family belonged to the Russia Germans. They later moved to West Germany, where Rusnak grew up in Pforzheim. He initially studied German in Munich but after one year switched to the University of Television and Film Munich, in the Department of Documentary Film.

In spring 2024, Rusnak married his longtime partner Sabine Wabnitz, a producer active in the German and U.S. film and television industries.

== Career ==
Rusnak's debut as writer and director was his 1984 film Cold Fever, which was awarded the Deutscher Filmpreis for best director that same year. Following this, he worked for French television and directed episodes of television series.

In 1997, he directed No Strings Attached, Quiet Days in Hollywood (starring Hilary Swank), and Schimanski: Die Schwadron, a TV film episode of the German crime series Schimanski.

In 1998, he worked as second unit director on Roland Emmerich's Godzilla. Emmerich then acted as producer on Rusnak's next film The Thirteenth Floor, an English language remake of the earlier German TV miniseries World on a Wire. Rusnak also wrote the screenplay.

Rusnak did not direct his next film until 2007's The Contractor starring Wesley Snipes. He worked with Snipes again on 2008's The Art of War II: Betrayal. In 2009 he also released the horror remake It's Alive, a remake of Larry Cohen's 1974 film.

In 2010 he directed the drama Valerie starring Franka Potente. In 2012, he directed the film Beyond.

Rusnak was married to actress Claudia Michelsen until 2001. They have one daughter together, born 1996.

== Filmography ==
- 1984: Cold Fever
- 1997: No Strings Attached
- 1997: Quiet Days in Hollywood
- 1997: Schimanski: Die Schwadron (TV)
- 1999: The Thirteenth Floor
- 2007: The Contractor
- 2008: The Art of War II: Betrayal
- 2009: It's Alive
- 2010: Valerie a.k.a. Small Lights
- 2010: Perfect Life
- 2012: Beyond
- 2019: Berlin, I Love You
