= John Zogby =

American public opinion pollster, author, and public speaker

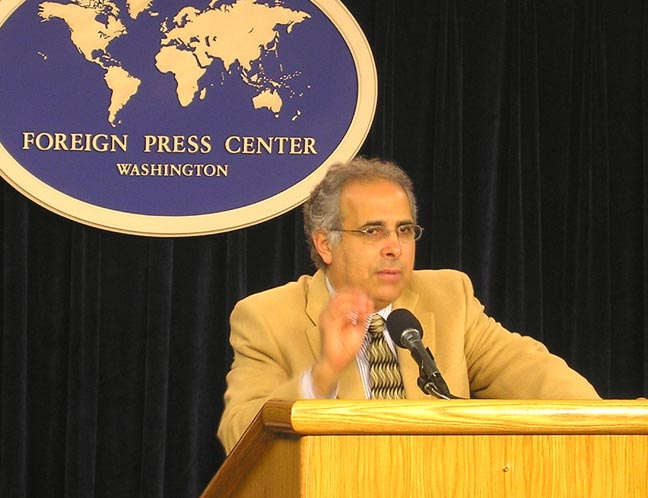
- Born: September 3, 1948 (age 78); Utica, New York, U.S.
- Education: Le Moyne College (BA); Syracuse University (MA)
- Political party: Democratic
- Relatives: James Zogby (brother)
- Website: johnzogbystrategies.com

John J. Zogby (born September 3, 1948) is an American public opinion pollster, author, and public speaker. He is founder of the Zogby poll, and the Zogby International poll. Besides his profile in politics, he has also become a figure in popular culture, and he is the subject of a 2024 documentary, People, Not Numbers, based on his working principle, "I poll people, not numbers."

== Early years and education ==
John Zogby was born on September 3, 1948, and grew up in Utica, New York, where he still lives. He is the son of Lebanese Catholic immigrants. His father, Joseph Rachid Zogby, was an immigrant from Lebanon who ran a successful Utica grocery store with his brothers. Immigration has always been an important part of Zogby's personal approach to polling, and he noted his father's immigration status in an op-ed, "I am the son of an illegal immigrant. My father came here illegally from Lebanon, and my father is my heart." He dedicated Beyond the Horse Race to his mother, Salemi (Celia Ann) Zogby, who was born in Pennsylvania to Lebanese immigrant parents, and whom he remembered as "An educator of two generations of Uticans, [who] shaped the lives of thousands of young people who passed through her classrooms." John Zogby graduated from Notre Dame Junior Senior High School, and received a bachelor's degree in history from Le Moyne College in 1970 and a master's degree in history from Maxwell School of Citizenship and Public Affairs at Syracuse University in 1974. He completed all coursework and exams for a doctorate in history at Syracuse (ABD) in 1974. In addition to teaching at SUNY Polytechnic, he taught history and political science at Mohawk Valley Community College, where he was commencement speaker in 2011, and later chaired its capital campaign. His brother, James Zogby, is the founder of the Arab American Institute, where John has served on the board. In 1981, before his polling career began, John Zogby ran for mayor of Utica, New York.

== Polling career ==
Zogby currently serves as a senior partner at John Zogby Strategies, a marketing and political consulting firm created in 2016 with two of his sons, Benjamin and Jeremy. He launched his first polling company, John Zogby Associates, in 1984, conducting mainly local polls for candidates, parties, and the media in northeastern US communities through the 1980s. He tells the story of being part of a broad layoff at an Arab-American anti-discrimination group, and launching his polling firm immediately thereafter because so many of the Arab Americans he had worked with needed him and were ready to hire him. In December 1991, polling for several radio and television stations in Upstate New York, he published a poll in New York State showing that then-president George H. W. Bush was leading the state's governor Mario Cuomo by 6 points in that state. Governor Cuomo decided to not enter the 1992 presidential race the next day. By 1994, Zogby was polling the New York State gubernatorial race for the New York Post and WNYW-Fox 5. Zogby correctly called the winner, George Pataki, the only pollster to do so. Zogby's company was hired by Reuters news agency to poll the 1996 presidential race. "All hail Zogby, the maverick predictor," wrote Richard Morin, polling director at The Washington Post, when John Zogby was the only pollster who called the 1996 presidential election with near precision. Zogby achieved the same level of accuracy with his polling in the following two presidential elections.

== Books and publications ==
He is the author of four books: Beyond the Horse Race: How to Read Polls and Why We Should (Rowman & Littlefield 2024), as well as The Way We'll Be: The Zogby Report on the Transformation of the American Dream (Random House, 2008), and the First Globals: Understanding, Managing, and Unleashing Our Millennial Generation (with Joan Snyder Kuhl). We Are Many, We Are One: Neo-Tribes and Tribal Analytics in 21st Century America, emphasized a new paradigm for moving beyond demographics by allowing people who participated in the survey research to define themselves based on their attributes and values. The result is what Zogby describes as a bottom-up approach to segmentation analysis. He wrote the foreword to John Kenneth White's book The Values Divide: American Politics and Culture in Transition. Additionally, Zogby writes periodic columns (previously weekly) on Forbes.com, and he contributes a weekly presidential report card for The Washington Examiner's "Washington Secrets", by Paul Bedard. He contributes regularly to The Guardian, and is also a founding contributor to The Huffington Post.

== Awards and advisory boards ==
A former trustee of Le Moyne College (2000–2009), Zogby received the Distinguished Alumni Award in June 2000. He was also the director of the Keenan Center for Entrepreneurship from 2016 to 2018. He has three honorary doctorates, from the State University of New York and the graduate school of Union University in 2005, and from the College of St. Rose in 2009, along with Jimmy Fallon. In 2008 he was awarded the Chancellor's distinguished fellows award from the University of California Irvine. He has also received awards from the American Task Force for Lebanon. He has been named a New York State "Living Legend" by the Oneida County Historical Association, and has his name on the Mohawk Valley Welcome Center's Walk of Fame.

Zogby was a former advisor at the Belfer Center of the Kennedy School of Government at Harvard University. He was also a fellow of the Catholic University of America Institute for Policy Research and Catholic Studies. He served on the advisory council for biotechnology for the Center for Strategic and International Studies (CSIS), as a Commissioner on the CSIS Commission on Smart Power, for three years on its board of trustees, with board chair David Abshire, the CSIS founding chairman. He previously served on the congressionally created Advisory Group on Public Diplomacy for the Arab and Muslim World. Zogby is the former chairman of the educational organization Sudan Sunrise. He served on the boards of the Arab American Institute, and Upstate Venture Connect.

== In popular culture ==
John Zogby's polls have been referenced in popular culture, including NBC's The West Wing, CW's Gossip Girl, the Netflix series House of Cards, Richard North Patterson's novel The Race, the Simpsons, game shows such as the UK's Cash Cab, and the 25th Anniversary edition of Trivial Pursuit. Zogby Polls have been cited on The Tonight Show and parodied on The Late Show and NPR's All Things Considered. In 2004 and 2008, he was a guest on The Daily Show with Jon Stewart, an experience that he considered one of the highlights of his professional life. Political strategist Mary Matalin called him "The Prince of Polling".

== Personal life ==
Although political polling could easily have drawn him to New York City or Washington, DC, he has always remained in his home town of Utica, which he sees as one key to his success in understanding American communities more broadly. His wife Kathleen is a retired special education teacher and children's book author, Nonnie's Lessons of Love, Hope, and Nature (2016).

== Bibliography ==
- Zogby, John (2024). Beyond the Horse Race: How to Read Polls and Why We Should. Lanham, MD: Bloomsbury/Rowman & Littlefield. ISBN 978-1-5381-9714-1.
- Zogby, John (2016). We Are Many, We Are One: Neo-Tribes and Tribal Analytics In 21st Century America (First ed.). New York: John Zogby. ISBN 978-0-9913382-1-4.
- Zogby, John; Snyder-Kuhl, Joan (2013). First Globals: Understanding, Managing, and Unleashing the Potential of Our Millennial Generation. New York: New York. ISBN 978-0-9913382-0-7.
- Zogby, John (2008). The Way We'll Be: The Zogby Report on the Transformation of the American Dream (First ed.). New York: Random House. ISBN 978-1-4000-6450-2.
- Zogby, John (2006). Iran versus America? (First ed.). Utica, NY: Zogby International. OCLC 71340360.
- Zogby, John (2003). Public opinion and private accounts: measuring risk and confidence in rethinking social security (First ed.). Washington, D.C.: Cato Institute. OCLC 52641051.
- Zogby, John (1990). Arab America Today: A Demographic Profile of Arab Americans (First ed.). Washington, D.C.: Arab American Institute. OCLC 24357334.
