= Richard North Patterson =

American novelist, attorney and political commentator (born 1947)

Richard North Patterson (born February 22, 1947, in Berkeley, California) is an American fiction writer, attorney and political commentator.

== Education and law career ==
Patterson graduated in 1968 from Ohio Wesleyan University and has been awarded that school's Distinguished Achievement Citation and his national fraternity's Alumni Achievement Award. He is a 1971 graduate of the Case Western Reserve University School of Law, and a recipient of that University's President's Award for Distinguished Alumni and its President's Award for Excellence. He has served as an Assistant Attorney General for the State of Ohio; a trial attorney for the Securities & Exchange Commission in Washington, D.C.; and was the SEC's liaison to the Watergate Special Prosecutor. More recently, Patterson was a partner in Berkowitz, Lefkovitz and Patrick of Birmingham, Alabama and, later, in the San Francisco office of McCutchen, Doyle, Brown & Enersen before retiring from practice in 1993. He has served on the boards of his undergraduate and law schools, the National Partnership for Women and Families, the Family Violence Prevention Fund, PEN Center West, the Regional Panel For The Selection of White House Fellows, the Brady Campaign to Prevent Gun Violence, and the Renew Democracy Initiative, and was Chairman of Common Cause, the grassroots citizens lobby founded by John W. Gardner. He now serves on the Advisory Council of J Street, the pro-Israel, pro-peace advocacy group, and is a member of the Council on Foreign Relations.

== Writing career ==
Patterson studied fiction writing with Jesse Hill Ford at the University of Alabama at Birmingham; his first short story was published in The Atlantic Monthly; and his first novel, The Lasko Tangent, won an Edgar Allan Poe Award in 1979. Between 1981 and 1985, he published The Outside Man, Escape the Night, and Private Screening, which made the New York Times bestseller list in 1994. His first novel in eight years, Degree of Guilt (1993), and Eyes of A Child (1995), were combined into a four-hour TV mini-series by NBC TV, called Degree of Guilt. Both were international bestsellers, and Degree of Guilt was awarded the French Grand Prix de Littérature Policière in 1995. The Final Judgment (1995), Silent Witness (1997), No Safe Place (1998), and Dark Lady (1999) all became immediate international bestsellers, and in 2011 Silent Witness became a feature film on TNT. Protect and Defend (2000), about the controversial nomination of the first woman to be Chief Justice, and her entanglement in an incendiary lawsuit regarding late-term abortion and parental consent, was a #1 New York Times bestseller and received a Maggie Award from Planned Parenthood for its treatment of issues regarding reproductive rights. In 2013, the London Guardian Literary Review named No Safe Place one of the 10 best works of fiction, nonfiction, or biography inspired by John F. Kennedy and the Kennedy assassination in the 50 years since his death.

Balance of Power (2003) confronted one of America's most divisive issues—gun violence—and was chosen by USA Today as its book of the month selection for November. Conviction (2005) focused on the law and politics of capital punishment. Exile (2007) dealt with the Israeli-Palestinian conflict and was nominated for South Africa's leading literary award. The Race (2007) concerned a dramatic campaign for president, and Eclipse (2009) dealt with human rights, Africa, and the geopolitics of oil. The Spire (2009) was a novel of psychological suspense, and In the Name of Honor (2010) portrays a military court martial for murder, and a legal defense based on PTSD. The Devil's Light (2011) is an exhaustively researched depiction of the world of espionage and the potential for nuclear terrorism, focused on an Al Qaeda plot to steal a nuclear bomb from Pakistan in order to destroy a major western city.

Patterson's twentieth novel, Fall From Grace (2012), a family drama set on Martha's Vineyard, became his sixteenth New York Times bestseller. Its prequel, Loss of Innocence (2013), is a coming-of-age novel set in the tumultuous year of 1968. Its sequel, Eden In Winter (2014), concluded the trilogy. His first novel in nine years, 'Trial, was published in 2023..

Between September 2015 and May 2021, Patterson devoted his time to political commentary. During the 2015-2016 presidential campaign, Patterson was a contributing opinion writer for the Huffington Post, with a focus on politics and international affairs, as well as a guest commentator on television and podcasts. His book about that campaign, "Fever Swamp", was published in January 2017. Between 2017 and 2019, he was a columnist for the Boston Globe and HuffPost. Between March 2019 and May 2021, he was a columnist for The Bulwark, writing longer essays on politics, law, public policy and geopolitics.

In 2025, Patterson serialized on Substack his book-length essay America On The Precipice, describing the multiple tributaries of America's descent into authoritarianism. His 25th book, Tripwires: 15 Twenty-First Century Events That Undermined American Democracy – and How to Reclaim It, was published in September 2025 and addresses the crisis of our democracy and we can reclaim it.

Patterson has appeared on such shows as Today, Good Morning America, The CBS Morning Show, Fox News Sunday, Morning Joe, Inside Politics, Washington Journal, Buchanan and Press, Greta Van Susteren, Fox and Friends, and Hardball. Beyond his regular columns, his articles on politics, society, literature, law, and foreign policy have been published in " The New York Times, The London Times, The Wall Street Journal, "The Atlantic", USA Today, The Washington Post, The Los Angeles Times, The Boston Globe, the San Francisco Chronicle, FoxNews.com, Medium, and The San Jose Mercury News. A frequent speaker on political, geopolitical, legal, and social issues, in 2004 Patterson spoke at Washington, D.C. rallies in support of reproductive rights, and against gun violence, and has spoken about the Israeli-Palestinian dilemma at such forums as the National Press Club in Washington, D.C. and the World Affairs Council in Dallas. Patterson is a member of the Cosmos Club of Washington DC, and his papers are collected by Boston University. In 2012, Patterson received the Silver Bullet Award from the International Thriller Writers Association for his contributions to the wider community. Overall, the worldwide sales of Patterson's novels exceeds 25 million copies.

== Personal life ==
Patterson has three sons and two daughters. He lives on Martha's Vineyard and Jacksonville, Florida with his wife, Dr. Nancy Clair.

== Bibliography ==
The following are all novels by the author.

- The Lasko Tangent (1979)
- The Outside Man (1981)
- Escape the Night (1983)
- Private Screening (1985)
- Degree of Guilt (1993)
- Eyes of a Child (1995)
- The Final Judgment (1995)
- Silent Witness (1997)
- No Safe Place (1998)
- Dark Lady (1999)
- Protect and Defend (2000)
- Balance of Power (2003)
- Conviction (2005)
- Exile (2007)
- The Race (2007)
- Eclipse (2009)
- The Spire (2009)
- In the Name Of Honor (2010)
- The Devil's Light (2011)
- Fall from Grace (2012)
- Loss of Innocence (2013)
- Eden in Winter (2014)
- Trial (2023)

=== Non-fiction ===
- Fever Swamp: A Journey Through the Strange Neverland of the 2016 Presidential Race (2017)
