= The Audition (2000 film) =

- Directed by: Chad Lowe
- Starring: Hilary Swank; Chad Lowe; Brittany Murphy
- Music by: Philip Giffin
- Release date: December 9, 2000
- Country: United States
- Language: English

The Audition is a 2000 short film written and directed by Chad Lowe and starring Lowe, his then wife Hilary Swank, and Brittany Murphy.

The film aired on Showtime. Lowe stated that he intended to make a feature-length version to take to film festivals.

== Plot ==
A woman’s unhealthy addiction towards Daniella, a young celebrity that she watched at an audition.

== Cast ==
- Hilary Swank
- Chad Lowe
- Brittany Murphy as Daniella
- Lisa Arning as Nikki
- Jason Bryden
- Nicki Micheaux as Janet
- Shaker Paleja as Pablo
