= Beautiful Ohio (film) =

- Directed by: Chad Lowe
- Written by: Ethan Canin
- Produced by: Mark Burton; Brian Bell; Chad Lowe
- Starring: William Hurt; Julianna Margulies; Michelle Trachtenberg
- Cinematography: Stephen Kazmierski
- Edited by: Amy Duddlestons
- Music by: Craig Wedren
- Distributed by: Accomplice Films; Wonderfilms
- Release date: November 10, 2006 (AFI Fest)
- Country: United States
- Language: English

Beautiful Ohio is a 2006 American film, directed by Chad Lowe and starring William Hurt, Michelle Trachtenberg, and Julianna Margulies. The film, based on the short story "Batorsag and Szerelem" by Ethan Canin, is a coming of age drama/comedy set in the 1970s. The film was shown at the 2006 AFI Fest. It also showed at the 2007 Sarasota Film Festival, where Trachtenberg won the award for Breakthrough Performance and Lowe won the Red Star Award.

== Plot ==
Set in Cleveland in the early 1970s, the film follows William Messerman, a teenager who struggles to define his own identity while living in the shadow of his older brother Clive, a socially withdrawn mathematical prodigy. Their parents, particularly their father Simon, place great expectations on Clive, which creates tension within the family. William becomes involved with Sandra, a troubled teenage girl who is secretly living in the family’s basement and is romantically involved with Clive. As William develops feelings for her, he becomes increasingly aware of the complexities within his family and the emotional distance between its members. The film explores themes of adolescence, family dynamics, and the pressures associated with expectation and individuality, as William attempts to understand both his brother and his place within the family.

== Cast ==
- William Hurt as Simon Messerman
- Julianna Margulies as Mrs. Cubano
- Michelle Trachtenberg as Sandra
- Brett Davern as William
- David Call as Clive
- Rita Wilson as Judith Messerman
- Jeremy Allen White as Young Clive
