= Dark Lady (novel) =

1999 Crime Thriller Novel

- Author: Richard North Patterson
- Publisher: Ballantine Books
- Publication date: 1999
- Pages: 448
- ISBN: 0345404785

Dark Lady is a novel by Richard North Patterson published in 1999.

== Reception ==
- Entertainment Weekly qualified it as a legal thriller-cum-murder mystery, and criticized its characterizations, pacing, and lack of suspense.
- The Wall Street Journal praised the suspense.
