= The Art of War II: Betrayal =

2008 action film

- DVD cover
- Directed by: Josef Rusnak
- Written by: Jason Bourque; Keith Shaw
- Produced by: Dan Lyon; Rick Shaw
- Starring: Wesley Snipes; Lochlyn Munro; Athena Karkanis
- Cinematography: Neil Cervin
- Edited by: Trevor Mirosh
- Music by: Peter Allen
- Production companies: Stage 6 Films; Hollywood Media Bridge; Insight Film Studios
- Distributed by: Sony Pictures Home Entertainment
- Release date: August 12, 2008
- Running time: 103 minutes
- Countries: United States; Canada
- Language: English
- Budget: $13,300,000

The Art of War II: Betrayal is a 2008 action film directed by Josef Rusnak and starring Wesley Snipes, Lochlyn Munro and Athena Karkanis. It is the second installment in The Art of War film series. It is the sequel to the 2000 film The Art of War. The film was released on direct-to-DVD in the United States on August 12, 2008.

== Premise ==
When Agent Neil Shaw comes out of hiding to vindicate his former mentor's murder, he winds up on the trail of betrayal and lethal corruption. Under the charge of his friend and a senatorial candidate, his mission is to set things straight. But when more people turn up dead, Shaw realizes that he's been set up as bait.

== Cast ==
- Wesley Snipes as Agent Neil Shaw
- Lochlyn Munro as Garret
- Athena Karkanis as Melina Cruz/Susan Marsden
- Winston Rekert as Reverend Tim
- Ryan McDonald as Alex
- Rachel Hayward as Senator Carlson
- Scott Heindl as Graham
- Michael Ryan as Senator Phillips
- Olivia Cheng as Geena
- Paul Bae as Stan
- Clifford W. Stewart as Mom/Daniel Maurice Clements
- Anna Mae Routledge as Tammy
- Eric Brecker as Becker
- Kenneth Yanko as General
- Dean Redman as Team Leader
- Michael Phenicie as Sallas

== Release ==
=== Home media ===
DVD was released in Region 1 in the United States on August 12, 2008, and was distributed by Sony Pictures Home Entertainment. It has sold 206,604 DVD units for a gross of $4,013,907.

== Reception ==
=== Critical response ===
David Walker of DVD Talk rated it 0.5/5 stars and called it an unnecessary, poorly-made sequel. Preston Jones, also of DVD Talk, rated it 1.5/5 stars and called it "painfully contrived and unnecessary". David Johnson of DVD Verdict wrote that the film is "a ponderous, sometimes ridiculous affair featuring a needlessly complicated plot, lazy performances and empty fight choreography." Joe Leydon of Variety called it "a tired and uninspired sequel".

== Sequel ==
A sequel titled The Art of War III: Retribution, was released in 2009.
