= Conviction (Patterson novel) =

2005 novel by Richard North Patterson

- Author: Richard North Patterson
- Language: English
- Genre: Thriller novel
- Publisher: Random House
- Publication date: January 25, 2005
- Publication place: United States
- Media type: Print (hardback & paperback)
- Pages: 463 pp
- ISBN: 0-345-45019-1
- OCLC: 56194905
- Dewey Decimal: 813/.54 22
- LC Class: PS3566.A8242 C66 2005
- Preceded by: Balance of Power
- Followed by: Exile

Conviction is a novel published in 2004 by Richard North Patterson. The novel centers on the debate surrounding capital punishment.

== Critical reception ==
Sherryl Connelly of the New York Daily News said that "Patterson too fully explores the political climate that predisposes judges against defendants in death penalty appeals" and that he "wallows in the legal complexities".
