= Beyond (2012 film) =

- Directed by: Josef Rusnak
- Screenplay by: Gregory Gieras
- Produced by: Steven Paul
- Starring: Jon Voight; Teri Polo; Dermot Mulroney
- Cinematography: Eric Maddison
- Edited by: David Checel
- Music by: Mario Grigorov
- Release date: 30 January 2012 (United Kingdom)
- Running time: 90 minutes
- Country: United States
- Language: English

Beyond is a 2012 psychological thriller film starring Jon Voight, Teri Polo, and Dermot Mulroney. The film, directed by Josef Rusnak, was shot entirely on location in Anchorage, Alaska.

== Plot ==
A detective searching for a missing child is approached by a radio psychic who claims to be able to see visions through the child's eyes.

== Cast ==
- Jon Voight as Detective Jon Koski
- Teri Polo as Sarah Noble
- Ben Crowley as Jim Noble
- Chloe Lesslie as Amy Noble
- Dermot Mulroney as Officer Jack Musker
- Julian Morris as Farley Connors
- Skyler Shaye as Megan
- Brett Baker as Gavin

== Release ==
The film was released directly to DVD in the UK on 30 Jan 2012, Germany on 30 Mar 2012, and the US on 22 May 2012.

== Reception ==
Chris Holt of Starburst rated it 5/10 stars and wrote, "...no matter how entertaining it may be, nobody would ever be convinced it had a chance in cinemas". Tyler Foster of DVD Talk rated it 2/5 stars and wrote, "Even though it doesn't make any serious mistakes or missteps, there's also nothing special about it; this is assembly-line entertainment to its very core." Gordon Sullivan of DVD Verdict described it as "just another by-the-numbers thriller" but recommended it to fans of Voight.
