= Hilary Swank =

American actress (born 1974)

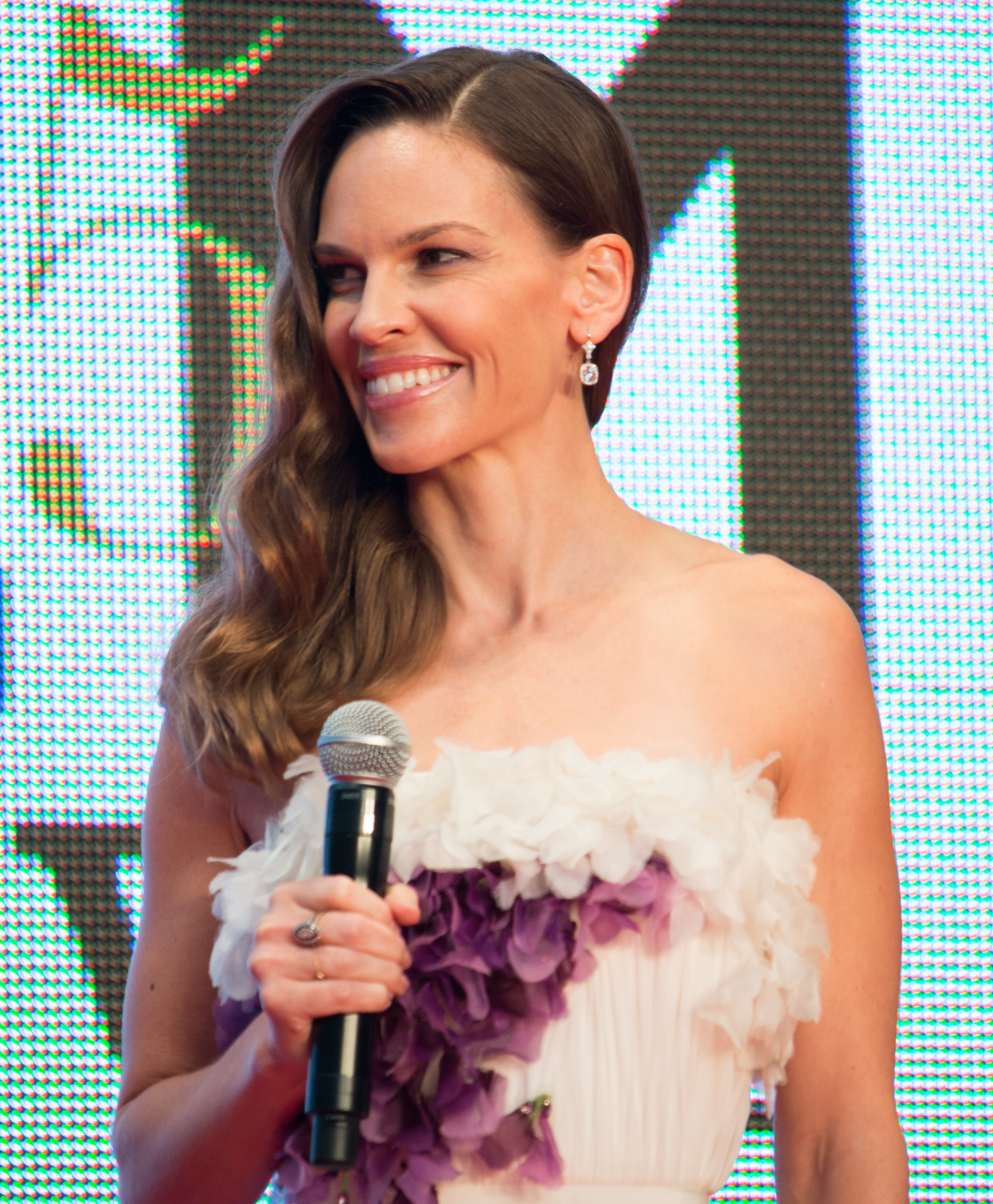
- Swank in 2015 at 28th Tokyo International Film Festival
- Born: Hilary Ann Swank; July 30, 1974 (age 52); Lincoln, Nebraska, U.S.
- Occupations: Actress; film producer
- Years active: 1991–present
- Works: Full list
- Spouses: Chad Lowe (m. 1997; div. 2007) Philip Schneider (m. 2018)
- Children: 2
- Awards: Full list

Hilary Ann Swank (born July 30, 1974) is an American actress and film producer. Known for her leading roles in film, she has received numerous accolades including two Academy Awards, an Actor Award, two Critics' Choice Awards, and two Golden Globe Awards as well as nomination for a BAFTA Award. She was named by Time as one of the 100 most influential people in the world in 2005.

Swank took early roles in Buffy the Vampire Slayer (1992) and The Next Karate Kid (1994). She later went on to win two Academy Awards for Best Actress for her portrayals of Brandon Teena in Kimberly Peirce's biographical drama Boys Don't Cry (1999) and a female boxer in Clint Eastwood's sports drama Million Dollar Baby (2004). She also acted in films such as P.S. I Love You (2006), Freedom Writers (2007), Amelia (2009), Conviction (2010), New Year's Eve (2011), The Homesman (2014), Logan Lucky (2017), and The Hunt (2020).

On television, Swank portrayed Carly Reynolds on the eighth season of Beverly Hills, 90210 (1997–98), and Alice Paul in the HBO television film Iron Jawed Angels (2004), the later of which earned her Actor Award and Golden Globe Award nominations. She also acted in the HBO film Mary and Martha (2013), the FX drama series Trust (2018), the Showtime series Yellowjackets (2025), the Netflix science-fiction series Away (2020) and the Hulu crime series Alaska Daily (2022–2023), the later two of which she also executive produced.

== Early life ==
Hilary Ann Swank was born on July 30, 1974, in Lincoln, Nebraska, to Judy Kay (née Clough) and Stephen Swank. Many of Swank's family members are from Ringgold County, Iowa. Her maternal grandmother, Frances Martha Clough (née Domínguez), was born in El Centro, California, and was of Mexican descent. Swank's paternal grandmother was born in England; her other ancestry includes Dutch, German, Ulster-Scots, Scottish, Swiss, and Welsh. The surname "Swank", originally "Schwenk", is of German origin.

After living in Spokane, Washington, Swank's family moved into a home near Lake Samish, near Bellingham, Washington, when Swank was six. She attended Happy Valley Elementary School, Fairhaven Middle School, then Sehome High School in Bellingham until she was 16. She competed in the Junior Olympics, the Washington state championships in swimming, and ranked fifth in the state in all-around gymnastics. Swank made her first appearance on stage when she was nine years old, starring in The Jungle Book.

When Swank was 15, her parents separated, and her mother, supportive of her daughter's desire to act, moved with her to Los Angeles, where they lived in their car until her mother saved enough money to rent an apartment. Swank has called her mother the inspiration for her acting career and her life. In California, Swank enrolled in South Pasadena High School, later dropping out. She described her time at that school: "I felt like such an outsider. I didn't feel like I fit in. I didn't belong in any way. I didn't even feel like the teachers wanted me there. I just felt like I wasn't seen or understood." She explained that she became an actor because she felt like an outsider, "As a kid I felt that I belonged only when I read a book or saw a movie, and could get involved with a character. It was natural that I became an actor because I longed so much to be those other people, or at least to play them."

== Career ==
=== 1992–1998: Early roles ===
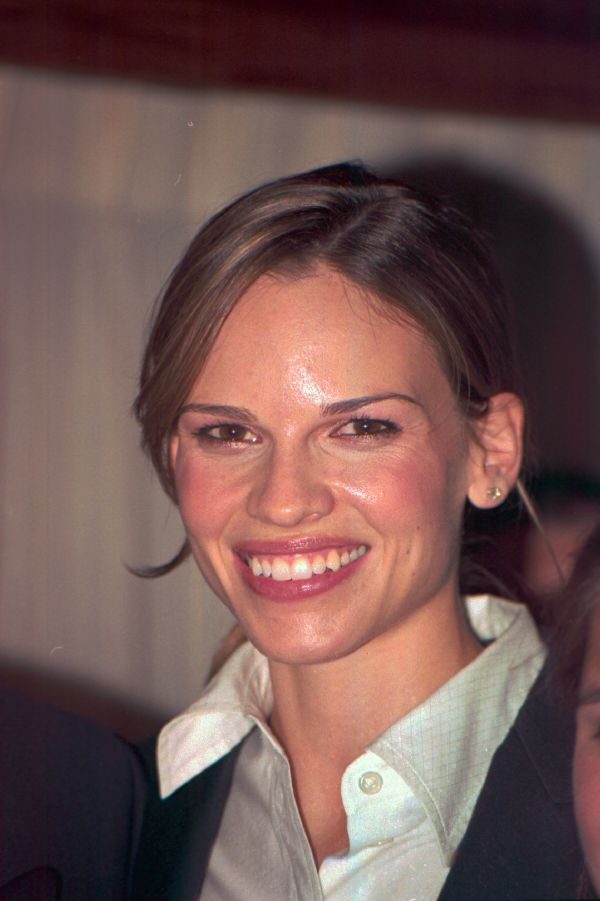
Swank in 2004

Swank made her film debut in the 1992 comedy horror film Buffy the Vampire Slayer, playing a supporting role, after which she acted in the direct-to-video drama Quiet Days in Hollywood, where she co-starred with Chad Lowe, to whom she was married from 1997 to 2007. Her first leading film role was in the fourth installment of the Karate Kid series, The Next Karate Kid (1994) as Julie Pierce. The role used her gymnastics background and paired her with Pat Morita. In 1994, she also starred in the drama, Cries Unheard: The Donna Yaklich Story, as the abused stepdaughter who was protected by Donna (Jaclyn Smith). In 1995, she appeared with British actor Bruce Payne in Kounterfeit. In 1996, she starred in a TV movie, family drama Terror in the Family, as a troubled teenager. In September 1997, Swank played single mother Carly Reynolds in Beverly Hills, 90210 and was initially promised it would be a two-year role, but saw her character written out after 16 episodes in January 1998. Swank later stated that she was devastated at being cut from the show, thinking, "If I'm not good enough for 90210, I'm not good enough for anything."

=== 1999–2004: Stardom and Awards success ===
Being cut from Beverly Hills, 90210 freed her to audition for the role of Brandon Teena in Boys Don't Cry. To prepare for the role, Swank lived as a man for a month and reduced her body fat to 7%. She earned only $75 per day for her work on the film, culminating in a total of $3,000. Her earnings were so low that she had not even earned enough to qualify for health insurance. Upon release, many critics lauded her performance, with Premiere listing it as one of the "100 Greatest Performances of All Time". James Berardinelli wrote at the time that Swank "gives the performance of her career". Her work earned her several accolades, including the Golden Globe and Academy Award for Best Actress. In an interview with Variety in 2020, Swank said that she felt a trans actor should have played the role, and had she been offered it today, she would have refused it, stating "Twenty-one years later, not only are trans people having their lives and living, thankfully, although we still have a long way to go in their safety and their inclusivity, but we now have a bunch of trans actors who would obviously be a lot more right for the role and have the opportunity to actually audition for the role."

Swank again won the Academy Award and Golden Globe Award for Best Actress for playing a female boxer in Clint Eastwood's 2004 film Million Dollar Baby, a role for which she underwent extensive training in the ring and weight room, aided by professional trainer Grant L. Roberts, gaining 19 pounds of muscle. With her second Oscar, she had joined the ranks of Vivien Leigh, Sally Field, and Luise Rainer as the only actresses to have been nominated for Academy Awards for Best Actress twice and won both times. After winning her second Oscar, she said, "I don't know what I did in this life to deserve this. I'm just a girl from a trailer park who had a dream."

=== 2006–2015: Established actor ===
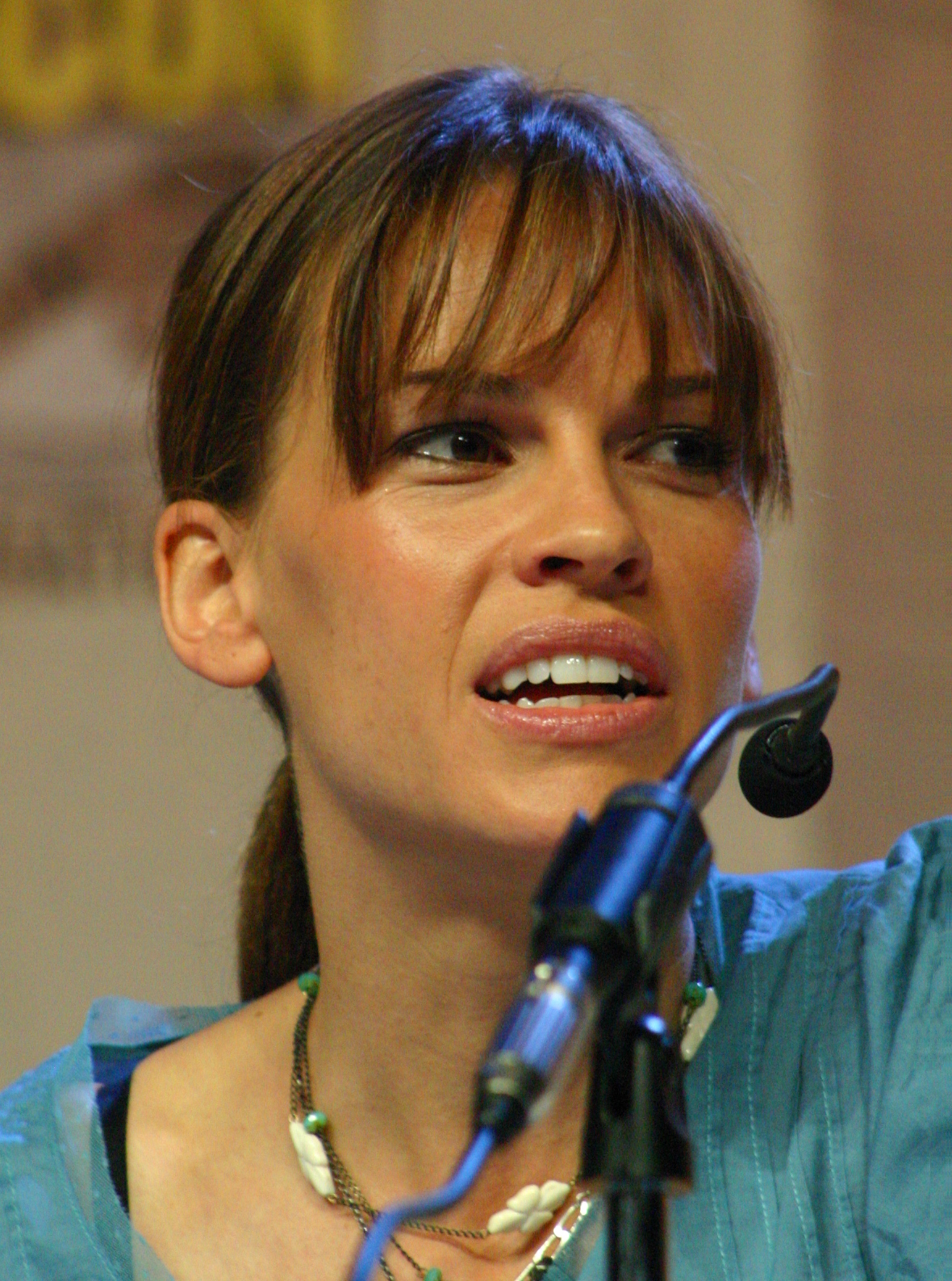
Swank at the 2006 San Diego Comic-Con

In 2006, Swank signed a three-year contract with Guerlain to be the face of the women's fragrance Insolence. She received a star on the Hollywood Walk of Fame in the motion picture category on January 8, 2007; it was the 2,325th star presented. In 2007, Swank starred in Freedom Writers, about a real-life teacher, Erin Gruwell. Many reviews of her performance were positive, with one critic noting that she "brings credibility" to the role, and another stating that her performance reaches a "singular lack of artifice, stripping herself back to the bare essentials".

Swank next starred in the horror film The Reaping (2007), as a debunker of religious phenomena. Swank convinced the producers to move the film's setting from New England to the Deep South, and the film was filmed in Baton Rouge, Louisiana, when Hurricane Katrina struck. The same year, she also appeared in the romantic drama P.S. I Love You with Gerard Butler.

Swank portrayed the pioneering aviator Amelia Earhart in the 2009 biopic Amelia, which she also co-executive produced through 2S Films, a production company she established with producer Molly Smith. In preparation for the role, she began a series of flight training lessons in a Cirrus SR22. In 2010 she starred opposite Sam Rockwell in the drama film Conviction (2010).

In 2012, Swank's audiobook recording of Caroline Knapp's Pack of Two: The Intricate Bond Between People and Dogs was released at Audible.com. In 2013, she starred in the television film Mary and Martha alongside Brenda Blethyn. In 2014, Swank played the lead role of Kate Parker, a woman whose life is shattered when she develops the degenerative disease ALS, in You're Not You. The film co-starred Emmy Rossum and Josh Duhamel. In 2015, she was listed as one of BBC's 100 Women.

=== 2016–present: Career fluctuations ===
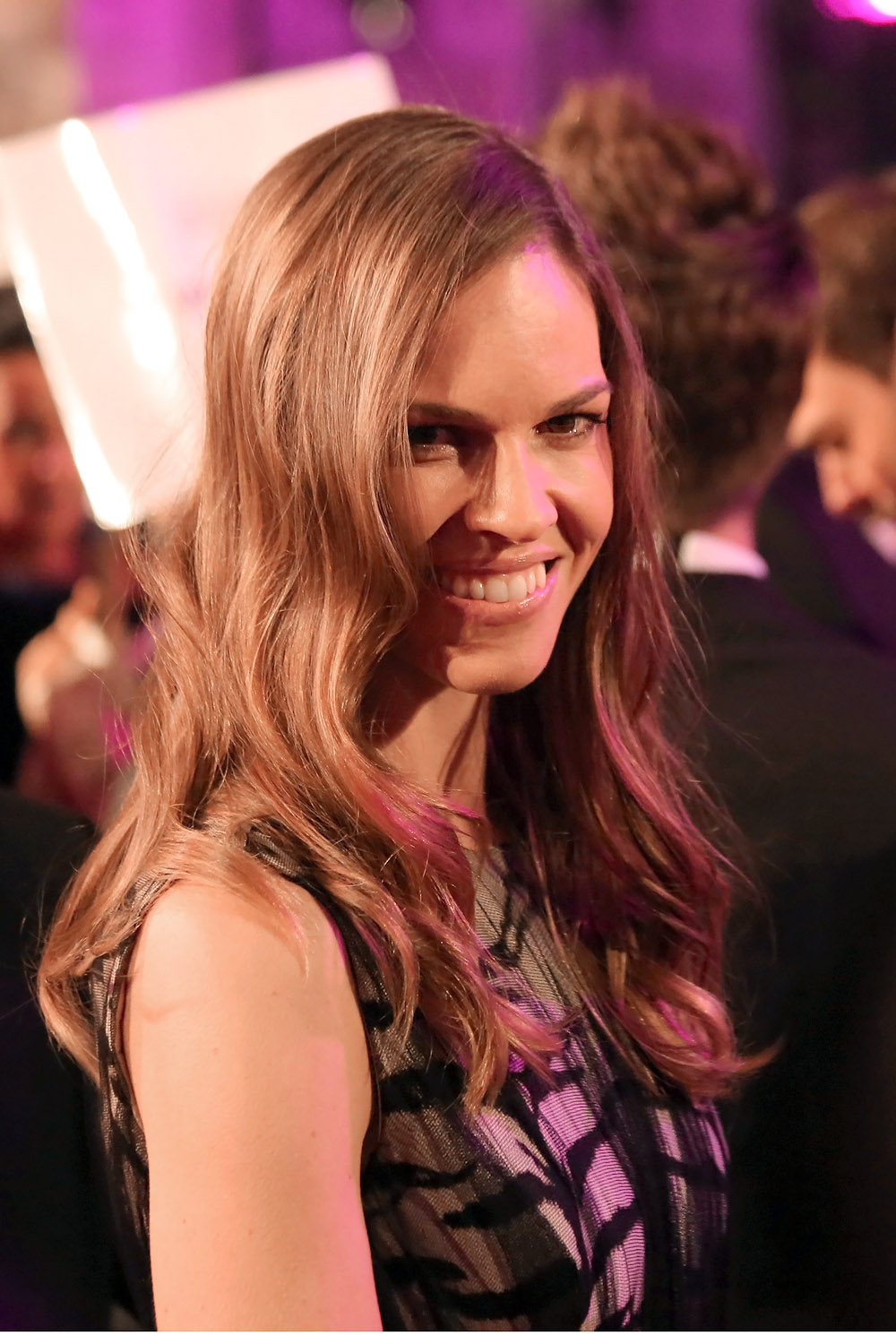
Swank at the 2013 Life Ball in Vienna, Austria

In 2017, she appeared in Steven Soderbergh's heist comedy Logan Lucky, as Special Agent Sarah Grayson, alongside Channing Tatum and Daniel Craig, and portrayed lawyer Colette Hughes in Bille August's drama film 55 Steps. In 2018, Swank starred in and executive produced the Alzheimer's disease drama film What They Had, directed by Elizabeth Chomko. Also in 2018, she portrayed Gail Getty in the first season of FX's anthology series Trust. Swank was reported to star as Laura Murphy in Alejandro González Iñárritu's drama series The One Percent.

In July 2019, Swank was cast in the thriller film The Hunt, opposite Betty Gilpin. Before its release, the film's plot, about deadly violence between political liberals and conservatives caused controversy, after which its release was delayed by Universal from the original date of September 2019. Swank commented on the situation, stating: "No one's seen the film. You can't really have a conversation about it without understanding what it's about." The film was released in 2020, and received mixed reviews. In September 2020, Swank portrayed Emma, an astronaut, in the Netflix science drama series Away, which was canceled after one season. For both The Hunt and Away, Swank earned a total of three nominations at the 2021 Critics' Choice Super Awards.

During Cobra Kai's run, there was speculation that Swank might reprise the role of Julie Pierce from The Next Karate Kid (1994). According to Josh Heald, they had a storyline involving Julie related to Mr. Miyagi and the mystery of a stolen necklace, "but before we got too deep, we had to reach out to Hilary and find out would she be willing to come and play with us." At the end of the series in 2025, Heald, Jon Hurwitz, and Hayden Schlossberg stated that Swank would not appear as, "people have all sorts of reasons why they will or will not be participating in something, and with the timing of whatever was going on, it just was never an option." However, they also indicated that they will "have to see what might happen in this universe if we’re fortunate enough to continue writing within it. She’s a character that we have a lot of excitement to revisit."

== Other ventures ==
=== Clothing line ===
On October 18, 2016, Swank announced that she was launching a luxury clothing line, Mission Statement. The collection includes jackets, tops, dresses, bottoms, sports bras and sweaters that are made of eco-friendly technical fabrics, priced from $125 to $1,150. Swank aimed to create clothing that is eco-conscious and devoid of large logos, saying in an interview with DuJour that "we believe in promoting the women wearing the clothes and not the brand itself, which is why there is no external branding." The brand works with suppliers that follow strict environmental policies and sustainable production practices.

=== Philanthropy ===
In July 2007, hair product brand Pantene, in partnership with the Entertainment Industry Foundation's Women's Cancer Research Fund, signed Swank to represent Pantene Beautiful Lengths charity campaign in 2008. The campaign encouraged people to donate their healthy hair to create free wigs for women who have lost their hair due to cancer treatment. Swank participated in Pantene's Million Inch Chain program by cutting her hair and donating it.

Swank hosted and co-produced a two-hour television special, Fox's Cause for Paws: An All-Star Dog Special, which aired on Thanksgiving night in 2014. The show celebrated the human-dog connection and rescue dogs. In 2014, The Petco Foundation honored Swank for her animal advocacy work and, in 2015, she received the Compassion Award by ASPCA. Also in 2015, Swank founded a nonprofit organization, the Hilaroo Foundation, which aims to bring at-risk teenagers and rescue dogs together in the hope that the two can heal each other. She was inspired to create the foundation after rescuing a dog called Karoo in South Africa.

On February 24, 2024, Hilary Swank supported Ukraine by appearing in a video with 29 other world stars to support Ukraine against Russia. In May of that year, she joined UNITED24 ambassadors and will raise funds for Ukraine.

== Personal life ==
In a January 2009 episode of The Office, "Prince Family Paper", the subplot of the episode is the office coworkers debating whether or not Hilary Swank is "hot". Swank referred to such discussions emphasizing the looks of women in Hollywood as doing a "disservice".

In October 2011, Swank attracted controversy for attending an event in Chechnya's capital Grozny on the 35th birthday of Chechen president Ramzan Kadyrov on October 5. After wishing him "Happy birthday, Mr. President", she reportedly claimed knowledge about Kadyrov saying, "I read. I do my research." Following criticism from human rights groups, that reported having informed her about the human rights abuses in Chechnya prior to the event and asked her to reconsider her participation, Swank said she was unaware that Kadyrov had been accused of human rights violations and that she "deeply regrets" taking part in the lavish concert. She donated her personal appearance fees "to various charitable organizations".

In a 2020 interview with Health, Swank revealed that she took a three-year break from acting beginning in 2014 to help her father recover from a lung transplant.

She has been good friends with actress Mariska Hargitay since the two met on the set of television series ER. Hargitay was a maid of honor at Swank's wedding to Philip Schneider in 2018.

=== Relationships and marriages ===
While filming Quiet Days in Hollywood, Swank met actor Chad Lowe. They married on September 28, 1997. They announced their intention to divorce on January 9, 2006, which was finalized on November 1, 2007. Swank alleged that Lowe's substance abuse issues were a reason for the split.

In 2007 Swank began dating her agent John Campisi, a relationship they ended in May 2012.

On March 22, 2016, Swank announced her engagement to Rubén Torres, a financial advisor with UBS and former professional tennis player. The two had been dating since May 2015. In June 2016, Swank's representative confirmed that Torres and she had ended their engagement.

On August 18, 2018, she married entrepreneur Philip Schneider after two years of dating. On October 5, 2022, she announced that she and her husband were expecting twins. On April 10, 2023, she announced that she had welcomed her twins, a son and a daughter. On October 14, 2026, Swank, then 52, announced that she is pregnant with their third child.

== See also ==
- List of actors with two or more Academy Awards in acting categories
- List of oldest and youngest Academy Award winners and nominees
- List of stars on the Hollywood Walk of Fame
- List of actors with Hollywood Walk of Fame motion picture stars
