= Chad Lowe =

American actor (born 1968)

- Born: Charles Davis Lowe II; January 15, 1968 (age 58); Dayton, Ohio, U.S.
- Occupation: Actor
- Years active: 1984–present
- Spouses: Hilary Swank (m. 1997; div. 2007) Kim Painter (m. 2010)
- Children: 3
- Relatives: Rob Lowe (brother); John Owen Lowe (nephew)

External image
- Lowe at the event for 24 in 2007

Charles Davis "Chad" Lowe II (born January 15, 1968) is an American actor and director. He is the younger brother of actor Rob Lowe. He won an Emmy Award for his supporting role in Life Goes On as a young man living with HIV. He has had recurring roles on ER, Melrose Place, and Now and Again. Lowe played Deputy White House Chief of Staff Reed Pollock on the sixth season of 24, and played Byron Montgomery on Pretty Little Liars.

== Early life ==
Charles Davis Lowe II was born on January 15, 1968, in Dayton, Ohio, the son of Barbara Lynn Wilson (née Hepler; 1939–2003), a teacher, and Charles Davis Lowe, a trial lawyer. His parents divorced when Lowe was young. He has an older brother, actor Rob Lowe, and two half brothers from the second marriages of his parents, the producer Micah Dyer (maternal) and Justin Lowe (paternal). Lowe was baptized in the Episcopal Church. He is of German, English, Irish, Scottish, and Welsh ancestry.

Lowe was raised in a "traditional midwestern setting" in Dayton, attending Oakwood Junior High School, before moving to the Point Dume area of Malibu, California, with his mother and brother. He attended Santa Monica High School, the same high school as fellow actors Holly Robinson Peete, Emilio Estevez, Charlie Sheen, Sean Penn, Chris Penn, and Robert Downey Jr.

== Career ==
Lowe began his acting career in the 1980s when he appeared in a number of television films. Lowe co-starred with Charlie Sheen in the 1984 CBS Television drama Silence of the Heart. In 1988 he co-starred with Tommy Lee Jones and Robert Urich in the made-for-TV film April Morning, which depicted the battle of Lexington in the American Revolutionary War. Lowe played the titular character in the short-lived sitcom Spencer, which he left after six episodes.

From 1991 to 1993, he starred in Life Goes On, for which he received the Primetime Emmy Award for Outstanding Supporting Actor in a Drama Series in 1993.

Lowe had recurring roles on Melrose Place, Popular, Now and Again, and ER, and guest-starring roles on Touched by an Angel, Superman, CSI: Miami and Medium. Lowe's feature film appearances have included roles in Nobody's Perfect, True Blood, Quiet Days in Hollywood, Floating, and Unfaithful. In 2000, he portrayed iconic singer John Denver in the television film Take Me Home. That year he also wrote and directed the short film The Audition. Lowe made his feature film directorial debut in 2007 with Beautiful Ohio. Lowe has directed episodes of Bones, Brothers & Sisters, Law & Order: Special Victims Unit, Hack, Without a Trace, and Pretty Little Liars.

In April 2010, Lowe replaced Alexis Denisof as Aria's father, Byron Montgomery, in Pretty Little Liars.

== Personal life ==
While filming Quiet Days in Hollywood, Lowe met actress Hilary Swank. They married on September 28, 1997. On January 9, 2006, Lowe and Swank announced their separation, and in May 2006, they announced their intention to divorce. The divorce was finalized on November 1, 2007. Swank infamously forgot to thank Lowe during her acceptance speech after winning her first Academy Award in 2000 for Boys Don't Cry. Upon winning her second Oscar in 2005 for Million Dollar Baby, Lowe was the first person she thanked.

In January 2007, a representative announced that Lowe was dating producer Kim Painter. Their first daughter, Mabel, was born in May 2009. Lowe and Painter were married on August 28, 2010, in a small ceremony in Los Angeles. Their second daughter, Fiona, was born in November 2012; she died by suicide at age 13 on September 29, 2026. Their third daughter, Nixie Barbara, was born in March 2016.

== Filmography ==
=== Film ===
| Year | Title | Role | Notes |
|---|---|---|---|
| 1984 | Oxford Blues | Computer Hacker | Uncredited |
| 1988 | Apprentice to Murder | Billy Kelly | |
| 1989 | True Blood | Donny Trueblood | |
| 1990 | Nobody's Perfect | Stephen/Stephanie | |
| 1992 | Highway to Hell | Charlie Sykes | |
| 1996 | Driven | LeGrand | |
| 1997 | Floating | Doug | |
| 1997 | Trading Favors | Marty | |
| 1997 | Quiet Days in Hollywood | Richard | |
| 1997 | The Others | VTV Director | |
| 1998 | Suicide, the Comedy | J.J. | |
| 2000 | The Audition | Uncredited | Short film |
| 2001 | Your Guardian | Parker Smith | |
| 2002 | Unfaithful | Bill Stone | |
| 2002 | The Space Between | Ticket Man | Short film |
| 2003 | Red Betsy | Orin Sanders | |
| 2014 | California Scheming | Mr. Behrle | |
| 2015 | Entourage | Chad Lowe | |
| 2019 | 7 Days to Vegas | Sheriff | |

=== Television ===
| Year | Title | Role | Notes |
|---|---|---|---|
| 1984 | Flight 90: Disaster on the Potomac | Al Hamilton | Television film |
| 1984 | Silence of the Heart | Skip Lewis | Television film |
| 1984–1985 | Spencer | Spencer Winger | Series regular; 7 episodes |
| 1986 | There Must Be a Pony | Josh Sydney | Television film |
| 1988 | April Morning | Adam Cooper | Television film |
| 1988 | CBS Schoolbreak Special | Michael Wells | Episode: "No Means No" |
| 1990 | So Proudly We Hail | Billy Kincaid | Television film |
| 1991 | Captive | Jeff Frost | Television film |
| 1991 | An Inconvenient Woman | Kippie Petworth | Miniseries; 2 episodes |
| 1991–1993 | Life Goes On | Jesse McKenna | Series regular; 35 episodes |
| 1993 | Candles in the Dark | Jaan Toome | Television film |
| 1995 | Fighting for My Daughter | Eric | Television film |
| 1995 | Siringo | Winton Powell | Television film |
| 1995 | The Show Formerly Known as the Martin Short Show | Rob "That's Right" Tarda | Television film |
| 1995 | Dare to Love | Stephen | Television film |
| 1995 | Snowy River: The McGregor Saga | Sam Taylor | 2 episodes |
| 1996 | ABC Afterschool Specials | Roger | Episode: "Me and My Hormones" |
| 1996–1997 | Melrose Place | Carter Gallavan | Recurring role; 8 episodes |
| 1997 | In the Presence of Mine Enemies | Sergeant Lott | Television film |
| 1997 | The Hunger | Neville | Episode: "A Matter of Style" |
| 1997–2005 | ER | Dr. George Henry | 4 episodes |
| 1998 | Target Earth | Commander Fauk, Alien Chief | Television film |
| 1998 | Poltergeist: The Legacy | Josh Miller | Episode: "The Covenant" |
| 1998 | Touched by an Angel | Arthur Bowers | Episode: "Miles to Go Before I Sleep" |
| 1998 | Superman: The Animated Series | Cosmic Boy | Voice, episode: "New Kids in Town" |
| 1999 | The Apartment Complex | Stan Warden | Television film |
| 1999 | Popular | Luke Grant | 4 episodes |
| 1999–2000 | Now and Again | Craig Spence | 4 episodes |
| 1999–2000 | The Wild Thornberrys | Buck the Ibex, Barking Deer #1 | Voice, 2 episodes |
| 2000 | Take Me Home: The John Denver Story | John Denver | Television film |
| 2001 | Acceptable Risk | Edward Welles | Television film |
| 2001 | The Zeta Project | Wade Pennington | Voice, episode: "Crime Waves" |
| 2001 | Law & Order: Special Victims Unit | Jason Mayberry | Episode: "Pique" |
| 2001 | Night Visions | Andy Harris | Episode: "Hate Puppet |
| 2003 | Hack | Jimmy Scanlon | Episode: "Brothers in Arms" |
| 2003 | CSI: Miami | Scott Mandeville | Episode: "Blood Brothers" |
| 2004 | Without a Trace | Lawrence Pierce | Episode: "Upstairs Downstairs" |
| 2005 | Medium | David Call | Episode: "Being Mrs. O'Leary's Cow" |
| 2005 | Fielder's Choice | Philip | Television film |
| 2007 | 24 | Reed Pollock | Recurring role; 8 episodes |
| 2009 | Bones | Brandon Casey | Episode: "The Doctor in the Den" |
| 2009 | Ghost Whisperer | Nathan Weiss | Episode: "Cause for Alarm" |
| 2010 | Drop Dead Diva | Daniel Porter | Episode: "Back from the Dead" |
| 2010–2017 | Pretty Little Liars | Byron Montgomery | Main role (seasons 1-3); Special guest star (seasons 4-7); 52 episodes |
| 2011–2013; 2019 | Young Justice | Captain Marvel | Voice, 5 episodes |
| 2016 | Rizzoli & Isles | Charlie Douglas | Episode: "Murderjuana" |
| 2017–2018; 2020 | Supergirl | Thomas Coville | 8 episodes |
| 2018 | Hailey Dean Mystery: 2+2=Murder | Clyde Bennett | Hallmark Movies & Mysteries Television Movie |
| 2018 | Hailey Dean Mystery: A Will to Kill | Clyde Bennett | Hallmark Movies & Mysteries Television Movie |
| 2019 | Hell's Kitchen | Himself | Episode: "Poor Trev" |

=== Director ===
| Year | Title | Notes |
|---|---|---|
| 2000 | The Audition | Directorial debut; short film |
| 2002 | The Space Between | Short film |
| 2003 | Law & Order: Special Victims Unit | Episode: "Soulless" |
| 2004 | Hack | Episode: "Extreme Commerce" |
| 2006 | Beautiful Ohio | Feature film |
| 2007–2015 | Bones | 13 episodes |
| 2008–2010 | Brothers & Sisters | 2 episodes |
| 2011–2017 | Pretty Little Liars | 15 episodes |
| 2014 | Twisted | Episode: "Danny Indemnity" |
| 2015 | Rizzoli & Isles | Episode: "Bassholes" |
| 2015–2018 | Life in Pieces | 6 episodes |
| 2016 | The Grinder | Episode: "Delusions of Grinder" |
| 2016 | Stitchers | Episode: "Red Eye" |
| 2016 | Notorious | Episode: "Chase" |
| 2017 | American Housewife | Episode: "The Snowstorm" |
| 2017 | Supergirl | 2 episodes |
| 2018 | Light as a Feather | 2 episodes |
| 2019; 2024 | 9-1-1 | Episodes: "The Searchers", "Buck, Bothered and Bewildered", "Confessions" |
| 2019–2023 | The Flash | 4 episodes |
| 2019 | High School Musical: The Musical: The Series | Episode: "Blocking" |
| 2021–2024 | 9-1-1: Lone Star | 6 episodes |
| 2021 | Titans | Episode: "Purple Rain" |
| 2023 | Found | Episode: "Missing While Homeless" |
| 2025–2026 | 9-1-1: Nashville | 6 episodes |

=== Producer ===
| Year | Title | Notes |
|---|---|---|
| 2005 | Celebrity Charades | Executive producer |
| 2006 | Beautiful Ohio | Producer |

== Awards and nominations ==
| Year | Award | Category | Title | Results |
|---|---|---|---|---|
| 1989 | Daytime Emmy Awards | Outstanding Performer in a Children's Special | CBS Schoolbreak Special (for "No Means No") | Nominated |
| 1993 | Primetime Emmy Awards | Outstanding Supporting Actor in a Drama Series | Life Goes On | Won |
| 1993 | Viewers for Quality Television | Best Supporting Actor in a Quality Drama Series | Life Goes On | Won |
| 2007 | Sarasota Film Festival | Debut Director | Beautiful Ohio | Won |
| 2021 | Garden State Film Festival | Best Ensemble (Feature) | 7 Days to Vegas | Won |
