= In Gut's House =

Studio album by Ut
- Released: 1987
- Genre: No wave
- Length: 44:13
- Label: Blast First

Ut chronology
Conviction (1986)	In Gut's House (1987)	Griller (1989)

In Gut's House is the second studio album by American no wave band Ut, released in 1987 by record label Blast First.

== Reception ==
Professional ratings
Review scores
Source	Rating
AllMusic	4.5/5 stars
Cokemachineglow	83%
The Great Alternative & Indie Discography	6/10
Loud and Quiet	7/10
Mojo	4/5 stars
New Musical Express	10/10
PopMatters	7/10
Uncut	8/10

Trouser Press called it "nearly as winning a balance of pop-conscious song-structuring and outright-croak as Sonic Youth's Evol-period".

The Wire included the reissue on their list of the top 50 albums of 2006.

== Track listing ==
1. Evangelist - 2:49
2. I.D. - 5:14
3. Swallow - 3:40
4. Big Wing - 4:22
5. Hotel - 4:37
6. Homebled - 7:13
7. Shut Fog - 5:38
8. Mosquito Botticelli - 4:02
9. Dirty Net - 1:21
10. Landscape - 5:17
