= The Race (Patterson novel) =

2007 novel by Richard North Patterson

- Author: Richard North Patterson
- Language: English
- Genre: Political thriller
- Publisher: Henry Holt & Company, Inc.
- Publication date: 2007
- Publication place: United States
- Media type: Print (hardcover)
- Pages: 352
- ISBN: 9780805079487
- OCLC: 85019247
- Dewey Decimal: 813/.54 22
- LC Class: PS3566.A8242 R33 2007

The Race is a political thriller written by Richard North Patterson. It is set during the 2008 presidential election in the United States, and revolves around fictional Ohioan Senator Corey Grace and his quest to become the Republican presidential nominee.

== Main characters ==
- Corey Grace, the protagonist, is the Republican Senator from Ohio, was a fighter pilot in the beginning of the book. He becomes a P.O.W. and was later awarded the Purple Heart. He was not close to his family and became a senator after the war; he particularly appealed to veterans of the war. He dates a black actress named Lexie Hart throughout the book.
- Rob Marotta is the Senate Majority Leader who attempts to win the presidency through power, money, and manipulation.
- Bob Christy is a Republican governor and religious fanatic, who presents himself as a "Messenger from God". He is liked by religious Catholics and has a strong backing from religious fanatics, in general.
