= Conviction (Ut album) =

Studio album by Ut
- Released: 1986
- Recorded: Cold Storage in Brixton, London & Berwick Street Studios in Soho, London
- Genre: No wave
- Length: 42:24
- Label: Out
- Producer: Ut

Ut chronology
Confidential (1985)	Conviction (1986)	In Gut's House (1987)

Conviction is the debut album of no wave band Ut, released in 1986 by Out Records.

== Release and reception ==
Professional ratings
Review scores
Source	Rating
Allmusic	3/5 stars

John Dougan of AllMusic gave the album 3 out of 5 stars, calling it "pretty intimidating stuff" and noting that it was "definitely not for the faint of heart".

== Track listing ==
All songs written by Ut

Side one
No.	Title	Length
1.	"Confidential"	6:27
2.	"Sick"	4:14
3.	"Phoenix"	3:27
4.	"Absent Farmer"	5:58

Side two
No.	Title	Length
1.	"Stain"	5:30
2.	"Prehistory"	4:35
3.	"Bedouin"	6:39
4.	"Kcahsmahs (Spare Coconut)"	1:15
5.	"Mouse Sleep"	4:14

== Personnel ==
UT

- Nina Canal – drums, vocals, guitar, piano on "Prehistory"
- Jacqui Ham – bass guitar, vocals, guitar, drums
- Sally Young – guitar, vocals, bass guitar, drums, piano on "Prehistory"

Additional musicians and production

- Denis Blackham – mastering
- Charles Bullen – recording assistant
- Bill Gilonis – recording assistant
- Chris Gray – recording assistant
- Tim Hodgkinson – recording, saxophone on "Stain", drums on "Mouse Sleep"
- Allison Phillips – drums on "Sick"
- Ut – production
