= Quiet Days in Hollywood =

- Theatrical release poster
- Directed by: Josef Rusnak
- Written by: Robert G. Brown; Josef Rusnak
- Produced by: Jörg Bundschuh
- Starring: Hilary Swank; Chad Lowe; Natasha Gregson Wagner
- Cinematography: Dietrich Lohmann
- Edited by: Christopher Koefoed
- Music by: Harald Kloser
- Production company: Kick Film
- Distributed by: Warner Bros.
- Release date: 17 July 1997
- Running time: 95 minutes
- Country: Germany
- Language: English

Quiet Days in Hollywood (also known as The Way We Are) is a 1997 German drama film written by Robert G. Brown and Josef Rusnak and directed by Rusnak. The film stars Hilary Swank, Chad Lowe, and Natasha Gregson Wagner.

== Plot ==
The plot features a series of interlocking stories. Each vignette is introduced with a character that had sex with someone in the previous segment. The movie opens with a seventeen-year-old prostitute, Lolita (Hilary Swank), who hangs around outside movie premiere with another teen prostitute in the hopes of getting a picture of her idol, movie star Peter Blaine (Peter Dobson). After her friend is forcibly dragged off by a jealous boyfriend, Lolita wanders around by herself in the streets of Los Angeles. Then she ends up performing a sexual favor for a man who ends up knocking her unconscious.

The man, a young African American named Angel, is engaged in questionable criminal activities. He later ends up trying to flee Los Angeles after he makes a major mistake during a drug deal. He takes Julie, a young waitress (Meta Golding), with him. After they have sex in a stolen car while driving through a car wash, Julie rethinks her plans to escape with Angel. After she notices that a car filled with men has been shadowing them, she runs out of the car. Angel is killed by the men.

Sometime later, Julie is working in an upscale restaurant as a waitress. She waits on Richard (Chad Lowe) who ends up sexually assaulting her in the men's room. In the next vignette, Richard has a tryst with Kathy (Natasha Gregson Wagner), his boss's wife. Kathy has a non-exclusive relationship with her husband, Bobby (Bill Cusack), who has a girlfriend on the side. Bobby is sexually propositioned by Patrick (Stephen Mailer), a sexually aggressive and drug addicted gay man, who is the closeted Blaine's boyfriend. The last vignette features a grief-stricken Blaine seeking sexual favors and companionship from Lolita, who is still sporting a bruise from her encounter with Angel.

== Release and reception ==
Quiet Days in Hollywood premiered in its native Germany on July 13, 1997, having also been shown at the film market of the 1997 Cannes Film Festival. On July 11, 2000, it was released onto DVD in the United States. Variety's Deborah Young wrote in June 1997, "Rusnak focuses on the performances of his young cast, not all of whom are able to climb above the unconvincing, often stilted dialogue and coincidence-laden plot. On the plus side, his stories are just non-American enough to offer a fresh view of an over-filmed town." She also praised the "modern" look of the film.

In 2002, TV Guide described the film as "La Ronde-style vignettes detailing the interlinked romantic encounters of a group of young Los Angelenos." It received two out of five stars in DVD & Video Guide 2005, by Mick Martin and Marsha Porter. The review states, "sex is the factor that links the different characters in this episodic movie set in Los Angeles. The awful dialogue may be the result of a script that was written in German then translated into English, but for whatever reason, it wastes a good cast."

In February 2004, Nashville station WZTV garnered controversy for airing an unedited version of the film on a Sunday afternoon, as it contained strong sexual content. This led to an FCC complaint being filed. Steve McClellan of Broadcasting & Cable magazine wrote in March 2004, "millions may have glimpsed Janet Jackson's famously overexposed breast, but there were some who saw a whole lot more of Hilary Swank four weeks later. The real hot TV action was in Nashville on Feb. 29, where WZTV treated a select few to a Quiet Days in Hollywood, starring Oscar winner Hilary Swank as a character named Lolita, who would do Nabokov proud. In the 1997 film, the now A-list actress struts her B-movie full-frontal stuff and purrs, 'If you want to f*** some more, you can come in here.' Needless to say, she's taken up on her offer—repeatedly."

== Cast ==
- Hilary Swank as Lolita
- Peter Dobson as Peter Blaine
- Meta Golding as Julie
- Chad Lowe as Richard
- Natasha Gregson Wagner as Kathy
- Bill Cusack as Bobby
- Stephen Mailer as Patrick
- Rebecca Staab as Amelie
