= Exile (Patterson novel) =

2007 political thriller by Richard North Patterson

- Author: Richard North Patterson
- Genre: Political thriller
- Publisher: Henry Holt & Co.
- Publication date: January 9, 2007
- ISBN: 0-8050-7947-5

Exile is a 2007 political thriller by American writer Richard North Patterson. It engages the Israeli–Palestinian conflict through a fictional trial for an accused Palestinian political assassin being defended by her former lover, a Jewish-American lawyer. The novel explores the multitude of religious, social and historical factors that have created the volatile nature of the conflict.

== Plot ==
David Wolfe (a German Jew) is a successful lawyer in San Francisco with a fiancée, a reliable job and soon to become a congressman. When he receives a phone call from Hana, a Palestinian woman who was his secret lover thirteen years ago at Harvard, his life completely changes. He is set on a thrilling series of events. He witnesses the assassination of the Prime Minister of Israel is in San Francisco by two suicide bombers. His lover Hana is incriminated as one of the masterminds. David rushes to her defense destroying his old life for the woman he loves. In his pursuit of justice for Hana, the struggles, conflicts and bombings in Israel between Palestinian Arabs and Israeli Jews are highlighted. His travels soon take him all over the Holy Land in search of answers to the conspiracy.
