= Convicted (disambiguation) =

One who is convicted has been found guilty of a crime by a court of law.

Convicted may also refer to:

== Psychology ==
- Guilt (emotion), an experience induced when a person believes that they have violated moral standards
- Shame, an unpleasant self-conscious emotion associated with a negative evaluation of the self and withdrawal motivations

== Film ==
- The Convicted, a 1927 German silent film
- Convicted (1931 film), an American film directed by Christy Cabanne
- Convicted (1938 film) a Canadian/US film with Rita Hayworth
- Convicted (1948 film), a French film directed by Georges Lacombe
- Convicted (1950 film), an American film noir directed by Henry Levin
- Convicted (1986 film), an American television film starring John Laroquette
- Convicted (2004 film) or Return to Sender, a film starring Aidan Quinn and Connie Nielsen

== Music ==
- "Convicted", a song by Darkane from Rusted Angel
