= What They Had =

2018 American drama film directed by Elizabeth Chomko

- Theatrical release poster
- Directed by: Elizabeth Chomko
- Written by: Elizabeth Chomko
- Produced by: Albert Berger; Ron Yerxa; Andrew Duncan; Tyler Jackson; Bill Holderman; Keith Kjarval; Alex Saks
- Starring: Hilary Swank; Michael Shannon; Robert Forster; Blythe Danner
- Cinematography: Roberto Schaefer
- Edited by: Tom McArdle
- Music by: Danny Mulhern
- Production companies: Unified Pictures; Bona Fide Productions; Look to the Sky Films; June Pictures
- Distributed by: Bleecker Street
- Release dates: January 21, 2018 (Sundance); October 19, 2018 (United States)
- Running time: 101 minutes
- Country: United States
- Language: English
- Box office: $260,136

What They Had is a 2018 American drama film written and directed by Elizabeth Chomko in her feature directorial debut. Starring Hilary Swank, Michael Shannon, Robert Forster, Blythe Danner, Taissa Farmiga, and Josh Lucas, the film follows two siblings in conflict with their father over whether or not to put their mother, who has Alzheimer's disease, in a nursing home.

The film premiered at the Sundance Film Festival on January 21, 2018, and was theatrically released in the United States on October 19, 2018, by Bleecker Street.

== Plot ==
When Alzheimer's-stricken Ruth Everhardt wanders into the streets during a blizzard on Christmas Eve, her daughter, Bridget Ertz, travels back to her hometown to help her brother, Nicky, convince their father, Norbert, to put Ruth in a nursing home and face the end of their life together.

Ruth returns home with her family and discussions ensue about her future. Nicky has secured a spot for Ruth in one of the premiere assisted care facilities in Chicago, yet Norbert insists that he alone can provide the best care for her. Nicky looks to Bridget for help, but her time away from her parents makes this a challenge to address.

Bridget is dealing with her own immediate family issues as she's never connected with her husband, Eddie, while her daughter, Emma, has anxiety and has stopped attending college. Nicky continues arguing with Norbert over Ruth's future and leaves afterwards. Bridget discusses her father's interference in her life just as they notice that Ruth has again disappeared. She is quickly found, but Norbert finally realizes that Ruth must leave for the assisted care facility.

Norbert reconciles with Nicky by visiting his tavern. Shortly thereafter, Norbert dies from a heart attack, leaving Nicky devastated. Bridget spends time with Ruth at the care facility and sees how well the staff are treating her. She leaves the facility with a restful smile on her face.

== Cast ==
- Hilary Swank as Bridget "Bitty" Ertz
- Michael Shannon as Nicholas "Nicky" Everhardt
- Robert Forster as Norbert Everhardt
- Blythe Danner as Ruth Everhardt (née O'Shea)
- Taissa Farmiga as Emma Ertz
- Josh Lucas as Eddie Ertz
- Sarah Sutherland as Mary
- Aimee Garcia as Dr. Zoe
- Jay Montepare as David
- Jennifer Robideau as Rachel

== Production ==
=== Development ===
In 2014, Elizabeth Chomko was selected for the Sundance Institute's Screenwriters Lab with a script for the drama film What They Had. In September 2015, Chomko's script was announced as a winner for the Nicholl Fellowships in Screenwriting. In June 2016, Chomko revealed she would also direct the film from her screenplay. Albert Berger and Ron Yerxa were later reported to produce for Bona Fide Productions, along with Bill Holderman, and Andrew Duncan and Alex Saks producing for June Pictures, and Keith Kjarval producing for Unified Pictures.

=== Casting ===
On March 17, 2017, it was reported that Hilary Swank, Michael Shannon, Robert Forster, Blythe Danner, and Taissa Farmiga had been cast in the film. Sarah Sutherland's casting was confirmed in August 2017.

=== Filming ===
Principal photography began on March 22, 2017 in Chicago, Illinois. On March 28, members of the Amboy American Legion performed a graveside service for a scene in the film on location in Westchester, Illinois. Conboy Westchester Funeral Home also hosted the cast and crew for filming on March 28. Production was set up in Hyde Park, Chicago for more than two weeks, concluding on April 17. Filming wrapped in Los Angeles on May 2, 2017.

== Music ==
In December 2017, it was reported that Danny Mulhern would compose the film's score.

The end credit song "Are You There" is written by Aoife O'Donovan, the film's writer and director Elizabeth Chomko and her mother Kate Chomko.

== Release ==
In May 2017, Bleecker Street acquired domestic distribution rights to the film. It had its world premiere at the Sundance Film Festival on January 21, 2018. What They Had was initially scheduled for release on March 16, 2018, but was pushed back to October 19, 2018.

== Reception ==
On review aggregator website Rotten Tomatoes, the film has an approval rating of 87% based on 119 reviews, with an average of 7.1/10. The website's critical consensus reads, "What They Had finds laughter and tears in its portrait of a family at a crossroads, with writer-director Elizabeth Chomko getting outstanding performances out of a talented cast." Metacritic assigned the film a weighted average score of 69 out of 100, based on 25 critics, indicating "generally favorable reviews".

== Accolades ==
Award	Date of ceremony	Category	Recipient(s)	Result	Ref.
AARP Movies for Grownups Awards	2019	Best Supporting Actor	Robert Forster	Nominated	
AARP Movies for Grownups Awards	2019	Best Supporting Actress	Blythe Danner	Nominated	
AARP Movies for Grownups Awards	2019	Best Grownup Love Story		Won	
Alliance of Women Film Journalists Awards	2019	Alliance of Women Film Journalists	Elizabeth Chomko	Nominated	
Heartland International Film Festival	2018	Truly Moving Picture Award	Elizabeth Chomko and Bleecker Street Media	Won	
Heartland International Film Festival	2018	Audience Choice Award	Elizabeth Chomko	Won	
Philadelphia Film Festival	2018	Best First Feature	Elizabeth Chomko	Nominated	
