= The Contractor (2007 film) =

- DVD cover
- Directed by: Josef Rusnak
- Written by: Robert Foster; Joshua Michael Stern
- Story by: Robert Katz; Andre Farwagi
- Produced by: Rudy Cohen
- Starring: Wesley Snipes; Eliza Bennett; Lena Headey; Ralph Brown
- Cinematography: Wedigo von Schultzendorff
- Edited by: Tracy Granger; James Herbert
- Music by: Nicholas Pike
- Production companies: Destination Films; April Productions; RMA Productions
- Distributed by: Sony Pictures Home Entertainment
- Release date: July 10, 2007
- Running time: 98 min.
- Country: United States
- Language: English
- Budget: $18 million
- Box office: $15,524,680

The Contractor is a 2007 American action film directed by Josef Rusnak starring Wesley Snipes, Eliza Bennett, Lena Headey, Ralph Brown, Charles Dance and Gemma Jones. The film was released on direct-to-DVD in the United States on July 10, 2007, and in the United Kingdom on August 6, 2007.

== Plot ==
Retired CIA black-ops hitman James Jackson Dial (Wesley Snipes) is living his life in seclusion on his ranch in Montana when he is offered the chance to redeem himself by his former employer, Jeremy Collins (Ralph Brown). Some years earlier, Dial had been seconds away from taking down notorious terrorist cell leader Ali Mahmoud Jahar (Nikolay Sotirov) but his carelessness allowed Jahar to escape, marking his assignment as a failure.

Now Collins wants Dial to complete his task by assassinating Jahar, who has been captured and is now in the custody of the police in London, England. Provided with a safe house, passports, and an assistant, Terry Winchell (Richard Harrington), Dial is off to London to complete unfinished business. Disguised as a priest, Dial gets into position in a church bell tower across the street from the building that Jahar is being brought into. When Jahar is brought out of the police van, his head is covered by a jacket, leaving Dial without a clean shot. Not wanting to fail again, Dial patiently waits for his opportunity.

Moments later, from his high vantage point, Dial spots Jahar standing inside the building with his back to the window. Dial grasps the opportunity and shoots through the glass, fatally hitting Jahar in back of his head. Because of the delay caused by a pair of cops, Winchell is late in bringing the getaway car, and this brings attention to them fleeing the scene. After numerous attempts to stop the car, the police open fire, killing Winchell. The car, now out of control, comes to crashing stop, injuring Dial. But Dial manages to get out of the crashed car. On the run and bleeding profusely, he makes his way to the safe house, where he meets curious 12-year-old neighbor Emily Day (Eliza Bennett), who lives with her grandmother (Gemma Jones). Emily helps Dial stop the bleeding. Even though Jahar has been eliminated, the assignment is still considered to be failure by Collins because Dial was filmed fleeing the scene by a security camera.

Meanwhile, Collins is being investigated in the US for running a CIA hit squad, and if the truth gets back about Dial and the death of Chief Superintendent Andrew Windsor (Charles Dance), which happened when Windsor apprehends Dial, Collins will be exposed. Stopping at nothing to keep his name clean, Collins frames Dial for the murder of the Chief Superintendent, even though Collins was actually the killer. Dial, now a wanted man by Collins and the British police, must do whatever it takes to prove his innocence, knowing that Inspector Annette Ballard (Lena Headey), Windsor's vengeful daughter, is also after him.

While Dial is being pursued by Collins and his rogue hit squad, Dial fatally shoots Collins, saving the life of Inspector Ballard, who found herself in Collins' cross hairs. Having earned Ballard's trust, Dial is seen by Ballard bidding farewell to young Emily who played a key role in Dial's survival. Later on, it is shown that Dial sent Emily a letter, along with two tickets to America for her and her grandmother, to see him and his horse Beauty on his ranch. The last scene shows Emily and Dial at the ranch in Montana, watching Beauty run free.

== Cast ==
- Wesley Snipes as James Jackson Dial
- Eliza Bennett as Emily Day
- Lena Headey as Inspector Annette Ballard
- Ralph Brown as Jeremy Collins
- Charles Dance as Detective Chief Superintendent Andrew Windsor
- Gemma Jones as Emily's Grandmother
- Iain Robertson as Cramston
- Richard Harrington as Terry Winchell
- Ryan McCluskey as Purcell
- John Standing as Sir Anthony
- Stanimir Stamatov as King
- Miroslav Emilov as Harris
- Velizar Binev as Beloit
- Nikolay Sotirov as Ali Mahmud Jahar
- Peter Kelly Morgan as Newscaster

== Production ==
It is set primarily in London and filmed mainly in Sofia, Bulgaria, and Cardiff, South Glamorgan, Wales, and partly in the US state of Montana. The filming lasted for 47 days, from March 31 to May 17 of 2006.

== Home media ==
DVD was released in Region 1 in the United States on July 10, 2007, and also Region 2 in the United Kingdom on 6 August 2007, it was distributed by Sony Pictures Home Entertainment. About 815,698 DVD units have been sold, bringing in $15,524,680 in revenue.
