= Eyes of a Child (novel) =

1995 novel by Richard North Patterson

- Author: Richard North Patterson
- Language: English
- Genre: Legal thriller
- Set in: San Francisco
- Publisher: Ballantine Books
- Publication date: 1995
- Publication place: United States of America
- Media type: Print (Hardcover)
- Pages: 576
- ISBN: 978-0345386137

Eyes of a Child is a 1995 legal thriller novel by Richard North Patterson, and is rated as one of the top ten legal thrillers by Narayan Radhakrishnan.
