= Elizabeth Chomko =

American actress

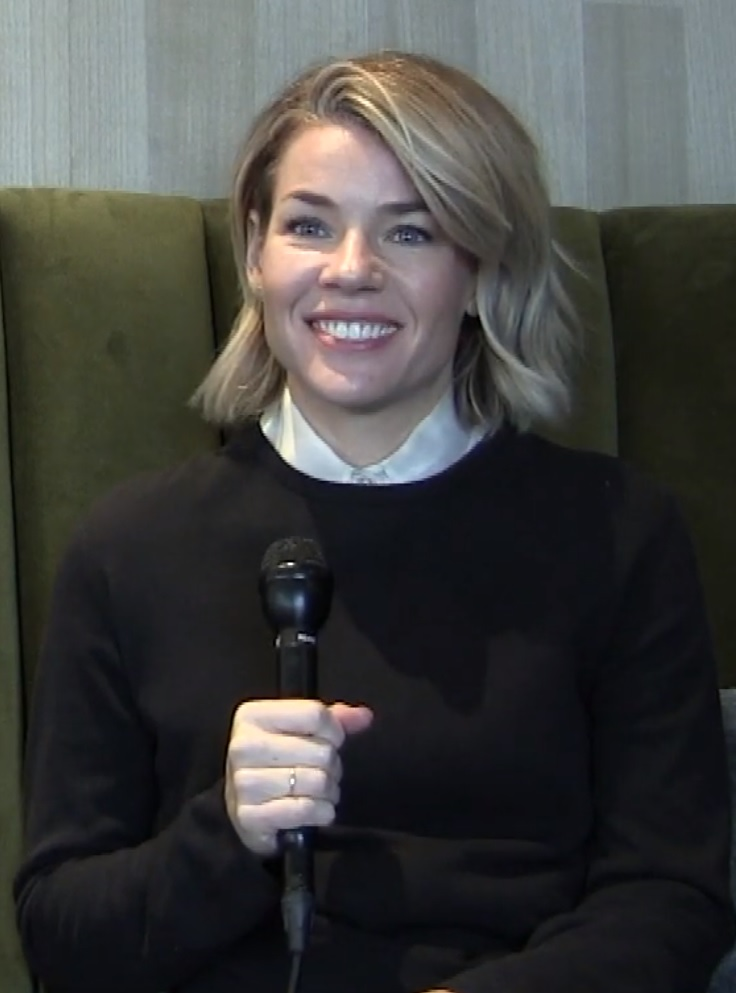
- Chomko discusses her film What They Had in 2018
- Born: 1981 (age 44–45); Chicago, Illinois, United States
- Other names: Elizabeth Montepare
- Occupations: Actress, filmmaker, playwright
- Years active: 2008–present
- Notable work: What They Had
- Spouse: Jay Montepare (m. 2011)

Elizabeth Chomko (born 1981) is an American filmmaker, actress, and playwright. She is best known for directing and writing the drama film What They Had (2018), which premiered at the 2018 Sundance Film Festival.

== Early life ==
Chomko grew up in Chicago, Minnesota and Wisconsin. Her family moved to Belgium when she was a freshman in high school. They later moved to California and she attended Los Altos High School in Los Altos, acting in the Broken Box Theatre Company and graduating in 1999.

== Career ==
After graduating, Chomko performed at theatres in Washington D.C. and was a resident company member at Rorschach Theatre Company. Her play Yield! was produced in the Page To Stage Festival at The Kennedy Center. She made her first screen appearance in 2008, and has appeared in CSI: Crime Scene Investigation and The Mentalist, and had recurring roles on USA's Common Law and FX's Terriers.

She was invited to the Sundance Institute in 2016 and came to prominence in 2018 after writing and directing the drama film What They Had; this screenplay had earned her the Nicholl Fellowship in 2015.

== Personal life ==
Chomko married TV personality and wood artist Jay Montepare in 2011; the couple live in Los Angeles.
