= Away (TV series) =

2020 American science fiction drama television series

- Genre: Science fiction; Drama
- Created by: Andrew Hinderaker
- Inspired by: the Esquire article by Chris Jones
- Starring: Hilary Swank; Josh Charles; Vivian Wu; Mark Ivanir; Ato Essandoh; Ray Panthaki; Talitha Bateman
- Music by: Will Bates
- Country of origin: United States
- Original language: English
- No. of seasons: 1
- No. of episodes: 10

Production
- Executive producers: Jason Katims; Jessica Goldberg; Matt Reeves; Andrew Hinderaker; Edward Zwick; Hilary Swank; Adam Kassan; Jeni Mulein; Michelle Lee
- Producers: Jeff Rafner; Patrick Ward; Chris Jones
- Cinematography: David Boyd; Brian Pearson; Timothy A. Burton
- Editors: Angela Catanzaro; Phillip J. McLaughlin; Peter Forslund; Dana Gasparine
- Running time: 44–57 minutes
- Production companies: True Jack Productions; 6th & Idaho; Refuge Inc.; Universal Television

Original release
- Network: Netflix
- Release: September 4, 2020

Away is an American science fiction drama television series starring Hilary Swank. Created by Andrew Hinderaker, the show premiered on Netflix on September 4, 2020. In October 2020, the series was canceled after one season. The show portrays the sacrifices an international group of astronauts make as they prepare to be away from their families for three years on the first crewed mission to Mars.

== Premise ==
Away follows the first human mission to Mars, the Mars Joint Initiative. The mission is helmed by American Commander Emma Green, supported by her second-in-command, an Indian medical officer. Rounding out the diverse team are a Chinese chemist, a world-renowned British botanist making his space debut, and a Russian cosmonaut who holds the record for the most time in orbit. Emma's husband trained as an astronaut along with her, and might have commanded the mission but for a medical condition.

The three-year mission launches from the Moon. Several crew members do not trust Emma's ability to command because of her response to a crisis situation at the very beginning of the mission.

The series is described as being "about hope, humanity and how ultimately, we need one another if we are to achieve impossible things".

== Cast and characters ==
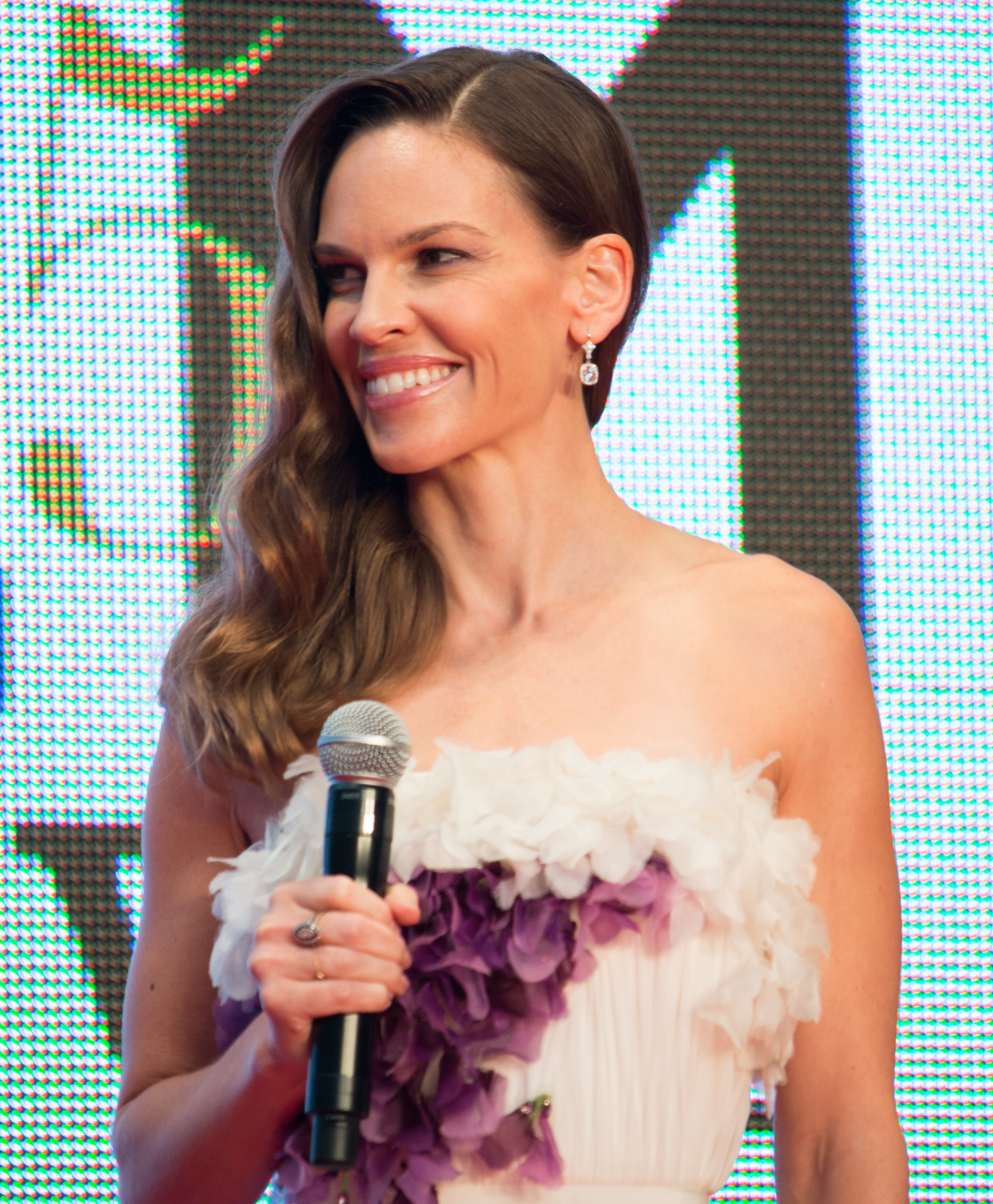
Actress Hilary Swank takes the lead role as the commander of a spaceship to Mars

=== Main ===
- Hilary Swank as Emma Green, a NASA astronaut who is the commander of the mission and the Atlas. She is also Matt Logan's wife and Lex's mother.
- Josh Charles as Matt Logan, Emma's husband, Lex's father, and an engineer for NASA who supports Emma's mission at NASA's mission control center in Houston. He was an astronaut, but was grounded due to having cerebral cavernous malformation (CCM).
- Vivian Wu as Lu Wang, a Chinese astronaut who is a chemist and who had an affair with CAPCOM Mei Chen. Lu is in a loveless marriage with her husband; they have a son together.
- Mark Ivanir as Misha Popov, a Russian cosmonaut and the Atlas engineer. He is the world's most experienced space traveler, who sacrificed his relationship with his family to his career. He is estranged from his adult daughter because he was in space when his wife died.
- Ato Essandoh as Kwesi Weisberg-Abban, a Jewish British-Ghanaian botanist and rookie astronaut. He was born in Ghana and raised in England by adoptive parents, after his birth parents died.
- Ray Panthaki as Group Captain Ram Arya, the mission's Indian second-in-command pilot and a medical officer. He is estranged from his family.
- Talitha Bateman as Alexis "Lex" Logan, Emma and Matt's teenage daughter.

=== Recurring ===
- Monique Gabriela Curnen as Melissa Ramirez, Emma's crew support and friend who is helping out Emma's family.
- Michael Patrick Thornton as Dr. Putney, Emma's NASA psychologist.
- Martin Cummins as Jack Willmore, a NASA astronaut who was a potential candidate to command the mission, and serves as CAPCOM.
- Gabrielle Rose as Darlene Cole, head of NASA Flight Command.
- Brian Markinson as George Lane, another NASA leader.
- Fiona Fu as CNSA Mission Liaison, Li Jun.
- Nadia Hatta as Mei Chen, a CNSA mission control, Lu's love interest
- Alessandro Juliani as Dr. Lawrence Madigan, Matt's rehab doctor.
- Felicia Patti as Cassie, Melissa's teenage daughter.
- Veena Sood as ISRO Mission Liaison, Meera Patel.
- Anthony F. Ingram as ESA Mission Liaison, Ted Salter.
- Adam Irigoyen as Isaac Rodriguez, a boy Lex meets when she returns to school and later develops feelings for.
- Diana Bang as Freddie.
- John Murphy as Ryan Masters.
- Derrick Su as Zhang Lei.
- Olena Medwid as Natalya Popov, Misha's estranged daughter.

== Production ==
=== Development ===
On June 10, 2018, it was announced that Netflix had given the production a series order for a first season consisting of ten episodes. The series was created by Andrew Hinderaker, inspired by an Esquire article of the same name by Chris Jones. Executive producers were expected to be Jason Katims, Matt Reeves, and Adam Kassan. Hinderaker was set to serve as a co-executive producer and Rafi Crohn as a co-producer. Production companies involved with the series were to include True Jack Productions, 6th & Idaho, and Universal Television. Michelle Lee, former head of development at True Jack Productions, who was involved with the project's development and sale to Netflix, was expected to be credited as an executive producer on the first episode. Lee left True Jack Productions in December 2017. Jeni Mulein, who joined the production company as the new head of development in April 2018, was set to be credited as co-executive producer on the second through tenth episodes. On October 19, 2018, it was reported that Edward Zwick had joined the production as an executive producer and would direct the first episode.

=== Scientific consultation ===
As with any science fiction production, Away blends real science with futuristic possibilities. A notable example is a plot point in Vital Signs in which the astronauts listen intently for a sound boom picked up by the real-life Mars rover InSight. In 2022 scientists used InSight to listen for the landing of a real spacecraft.

=== Casting ===
On May 8, 2019, Hilary Swank was cast in a lead role. On July 17, 2019, Josh Charles joined the cast in a starring role. On August 8, 2019, it was announced that Talitha Bateman, Ato Essandoh, Mark Ivanir, Ray Panthaki, and Vivian Wu would play lead roles in the series.

=== Filming ===
Principal photography for the first season began on August 26, 2019, and concluded on February 5, 2020, in North Vancouver, Canada.

== Episodes ==
No.	Title	Directed by	Written by	Original release date
1	"Go"	Edward Zwick	Andrew Hinderaker	September 4, 2020
The first crewed mission to Mars prepares for launch. Its commander, Emma Green, faces tensions within her crew when a fire breaks out in their ship, Atlas, and she is deemed responsible for it. Emma's husband, Matt, who works with NASA's Mission Control, has a stroke and goes through surgery. Emma considers requesting to be removed from the mission, but is encouraged by both Matt and their daughter, Lex, to stay. The Atlas successfully departs for Mars from the staging base on the Moon.
2	"Negative Return"	Jeffrey Reiner	Jessica Goldberg	September 4, 2020
The mission encounters its first problem when one of three solar panels, critically needed for electrical power, fails to deploy fully. Emma and Misha do a spacewalk outside the ship in order to fix the jam. Misha, who previously doubted Emma's ability to lead, revises his opinion of her based on her performance. Emma and Matt's teenage daughter, Alexis, copes with the stress of Emma's mission and Matt's hospitalization.
3	"Half the Sky"	Jeffrey Reiner	Andrew Hinderaker	September 4, 2020
The People's Republic of China (PRC) orders CNSA to remove Mei Chen from her assignment as an Atlas CAPCOM, when they discover Lu, who is married, and Mei are secret lovers. Jack Willmore, NASA, takes Mei's place and outs Lu's affair to the crew. Emma and Jack coordinate a clandestine phone call so that Mei and Lu can say goodbye until they meet again on Earth. Meanwhile, Matt enters physical therapy and is told by his doctor that he is not optimistic about recovery of his ability to walk. Melissa, who is Emma's crew support in taking care of Matt and Alexis, tries to help Alexis resume normal schooling, but in the process, it causes the latter's anxiety to spiral.
4	"Excellent Chariots"	Bronwen Hughes	Ellen Fairey	September 4, 2020
Ram contracts infectious mononucleosis, and attempts to open the airlock during a hallucination. Despite the risk of infection, the crew work together to help him. Ram recovers and reveals to Emma that he is estranged from his family because when he was young, he contracted typhus and his brother died taking care of him. Matt considers failing his physical exam so that he can maximize use of the hospital's rehab facilities, but decides against it in order to take care of Alexis. After having a difficult start back in returning to school, Alexis connects with Isaac, a fellow highschooler, who rides dirt bikes and whose army medic father was killed in action.
5	"Space Dogs"	Bronwen Hughes	Jason Katims	September 4, 2020
Christmas approaches, and the crew make peace with their loved ones before the Atlas loses near-instant audio/visual contact with Earth. Misha creates puppets for a show he puts on for his grandchildren and estranged daughter, Natalya, which he uses as an allegory to explain his calling as a cosmonaut. Misha's eyesight deteriorates, and Ram prescribes that he spend as much time as possible in his quarters in the ship's artificial gravity field. Matt struggles with living in a wheelchair and being reduced to a consultancy role for the Mars mission. Alexis sneaks out to spend midnight mass with Isaac, but is caught returning home by Matt.
6	"A Little Faith"	David Boyd	Janine Nabers	September 4, 2020
The Atlas' primary water reclamation system breaks down and the backup system is insufficient for the remainder of the trip. Misha suggests a risky plan to replace the primary filter with the backup, but is unable to carry it out because he cheated on his eye exam and his eyesight has continued to deteriorate. The crew reassemble the backup system, but it only produces water at 50% rate, necessitating rationing, and the death of Kwesi's plants. Through flashback, young Kwesi is shown growing up with adoptive parents in England and learning about the Jewish faith. Matt meets Isaac, and warns Alexis not to join Isaac in riding dirt bikes.
7	"Goodnight, Mars"	David Boyd	Aditi Brennan Kapil	September 4, 2020
Matt is brought back into the Mars mission support team to deal with the on-going water problem on the Atlas. Ram carries out psych evaluation for his fellow crew members, and is concerned with Emma's short temper. Emma is revealed to be dehydrated, after having used some of her water ration to keep one of Kwesi's plants alive. Alexis receives a message from Emma disapproving of her relationship with Isaac; out of stress and frustration, she rides a dirt bike recklessly and has an accident, and is rushed to the hospital. Realizing the errors of her ways, she later apologizes and reconciles with both her parents. In flashback, a younger Emma in NASA training learns that she's pregnant with Alexis and fears the baby will destroy her career, but she decides to keep it, with Matt's support.
8	"Vital Signs"	Charlotte Brändström	Chris Jones	September 4, 2020
Mission Control lose contact with Atlas' supply ship Pegasus, which has a highly critical water reclamation system necessary for the crew's survival. Assuming Pegasus has been lost, NASA advise a slingshot maneuver to bring the crew home. Lu considers returning without landing as a failure, and suggests using data from the InSight probe on the Martian surface to check if there was a sonic boom from Pegasus entering the atmosphere successfully. The sonic boom is detected, and Lu convinces Emma to not give up hope that the Pegasus landed safely. Meanwhile, Alexis deals with the stress of the events, including when Isaac blames himself for her motorbike accident and suggesting for them to take a break, really upsetting her, so she breaks things off with him. Later, she finally decides to get tested for the CCM gene that caused Matt's stroke.
9	"Spektr"	Charlotte Brändström	Jessica Goldberg	September 4, 2020
Two weeks out from Mars, the water system fails for good. Following NASA's recommendation, the crew need to extract water from the protective bladders used for radiation shielding in the walls of the ship. The first plan to drill from inside fails, and the crew lose use of their living quarters. The second plan of Emma and Ram doing a spacewalk to obtain water from outside the ship is successful. Ram confesses he has romantic feelings for Emma. Isaac and Alexis talk for the first time since her accident and breakup, and both try help distract her from her concerns about her mom. After Isaac apologizes for the way he acted, Lex considers giving him a second chance, so they get back together. Later, Lex spends the night with Isaac without Matt's knowledge.
10	"Home"	Jet Wilkinson	Andrew Hinderaker	September 4, 2020
Atlas prepares to land on Mars. Lu, who by insistence of the PRC has been given the privilege of being the first to step on Mars, receives instructions from CNSA that her first photo on Mars be taken with her reflective visor down, hiding her face. Emma suggests Lu use this opportunity to leverage Mei's reinstatement, but her attempt is unsuccessful. Alexis apologizes to Matt and Melissa for keeping secrets about Isaac; since he has seen Lex happy with him, Matt invites Isaac to join the families in Mission Control to watch the Mars landing. Melissa confesses to Matt she has feelings for him. Emma and Ram deal with the aftermath of his admission to her. Alexis tests negative for the CCM gene. Atlas successfully lands on Mars safely and the crew finds the Pegasus supply ship landed nearby. When Lu transmits her picture to Mission Control, it is of the whole crew standing together with their reflective visors up.

== Release ==
On July 7, 2020, Netflix released the first teaser trailer for the series, which was followed by the official trailer on August 10, 2020. Season one premiered on September 4, 2020. On October 19, 2020, Netflix canceled the series after one season.

== Reception ==
For the series, review aggregator Rotten Tomatoes reported an approval rating of 59% based on 66 reviews, with an average rating of 6.22/10. The website's critics consensus reads, "Away doesn't reach the stratosphere as a spacetime adventure, but emotional earnestness and a strong cast help make this a compelling enough journey to the stars." Metacritic gave the series a weighted average score of 59 out of 100 based on 27 reviews, indicating "mixed or average reviews".

Kristen Baldwin of Entertainment Weekly gave the series a C, calling it "a self-important patchwork of space clichés and boilerplate family conflict that never manages to make it into orbit." Reviewing the series for Rolling Stone, Alan Sepinwall gave a rating of 3/5 and said, "The space scenes, while familiar, are energetic, fun, and often moving, while the Earthbound drama feels like we're being abruptly yanked back into normal gravity after getting to enjoy the wonders of floating among the stars."

== See also ==
- Mars (2016 TV series)
- The First (2018 TV series)
