= Cries Unheard: The Donna Yaklich Story =

- Genre: Drama
- Written by: Christopher Canaan
- Directed by: Armand Mastroianni
- Starring: Jaclyn Smith; Brad Johnson
- Music by: Harry Manfredini
- Country of origin: United States
- Original language: English

Production
- Executive producers: Felice Gordon; Carla Singer
- Producers: Christopher Canaan; Joan Carson
- Production locations: Newhall, California; Pasadena, California; Santa Clarita, California
- Cinematography: Paul Onorato
- Editor: Robert Florio
- Running time: 91 min.
- Production companies: Carla Singer Productions; World International Network

Original release
- Network: CBS
- Release: February 1, 1994

Cries Unheard: The Donna Yaklich Story (a.k.a. Victim of Rage) is a 1994 American made-for-television thriller film directed by Armand Mastroianni, and starring Jaclyn Smith and Brad Johnson. The film is based on a true story.

== Plot ==
Through a series of flashbacks, Donna tries to tell her son, Denny, why she murdered her husband Dennis. When she returns to her hometown in Colorado from California for the summer, Donna is set up on a date with former aerobics instructor, and current police officer, Dennis Yaklich. She immediately falls in love with him, and quickly meets his teenage stepdaughter Patty. Patty is still upset over the death of her mother to an allergic reaction, especially because they were quarreling when they last saw each other. Sympathizing for the girl, Donna agrees not to return to California. To take care of Patty, she moves in with Dennis and becomes engaged with him shortly after.

The romance is short-lived, though. After being insulted at the gym, Dennis starts to shoot himself up with steroids, causing violent outbursts. One night, he is too restless to sleep, and orders Donna to leave the room. He then lifts some weights in the middle of the night, and violently orders Donna to leave when she asks him to come back to bed. Scared by her fiancée, she turns to her sister Susie, but she is too vulnerable when he begs her to take him back. They are married shortly after, but during the ceremony, Dennis already has another outburst against her, which causes Donna to spend her wedding night in fear. Patty later explains to her that his violent behavior is caused by the steroids, which he even uses at work to catch criminals in an unorthodox way.

When Donna finds out that she is pregnant, she explains to Dennis that she cannot live in fear and begs him to stop using the steroids. Unfortunately, he does not keep his promise, and starts to act violent again, even going as far as raping her while their newborn is crying in the other room. She packs her bags to leave with their son Denny, but Dennis kidnaps her and holds her captive. She contacts his friend, Jerry, to ask him to persuade Dennis to stop taking steroids, but Jerry tells Dennis of their conversation. Dennis threatens to kill her, or Susie, if she ever goes behind his back again, and he rapes her a second time.

Five years later, Donna focuses her energy on raising Denny, and Dennis becomes obsessed with the gym. When Patty admits that she is pregnant, Dennis blames Donna. He also forces her to tell Patty that she is disgusted by her and orders her to leave the house forever. Deciding that she has had enough, Donna flees with Denny to a nearby local shelter. Dennis, however, abuses his authority to make her leave and go home, where he threatens to kill Susie in front of her and then dismember her if she ever tries to leave with Denny again, bragging that he will get away with the murder. When Donna tells him she thinks that's how his first wife ended up dead, he mocks her and further mocks her when she cries and says she wants to die. He offers her his gun then aims it at her to do it himself, only to hear a click. He then tells her they're "just having marital problems".

Out of options and scared for her life, Donna pays Eddie Greenwell to murder Dennis. With the help from his brother Charlie, Eddie shoots Dennis dead when he parks his truck in the driveway one night. Unfortunately for Donna, her freedom and happiness is short-lived when Charlie's girlfriend eventually gives the brothers up to the police, and they in turn confess her involvement in the murder, leading to her arrest at a restaurant where she was happily having lunch with Susie, leaving Susie shocked.

In her conversation in prison with now grown-up Denny, Donna says that her trial was a media circus, and her only worry was if she would be separated from her son. While the jury acquits Donna of first-degree murder, they find Donna guilty of conspiracy to commit the murder, and she receives a prison sentence of 40 years. Her appeal is declined by the judge, because he is forced to give her a bigger sentence than what was given to the Greenwell brothers.

Denny was then raised by Susie, and chastises Donna for making his life hard because everyone knew who he was and what happened to his parents, and also that she could've avoided prison had she just killed Dennis herself. Donna does admit that she "just couldn't do it" when it came to pulling the trigger herself, but that she would do it again if she had the opportunity because she knows she would've been killed by him sooner or later. Denny, now going away to college in San Francisco, tells her that while he has resented her for not having been there when he grew up, he assures her that he never stopped loving her.

The movie ends with Donna's voiceover stating the lopsided average prison sentences for a woman killing her husband (30–40 years) compared to a man killing his wife (2–6 years), and that she was eligible for parole after 18 years served.

== Cast ==
- Jaclyn Smith as Donna Yaklich
- Brad Johnson as Dennis Yaklich
- Hilary Swank as Patty Anzlovar
- David Lascher as Denny Yaklich - age 18
  - Andrew Lawrence as Denny Yaklich - age 5
- Carolyn McCormick as Susie
- Ramsay Midwood as Eddie Greenwell
- Jason Kristofer as Charlie Greenwell
- David Gianopoulos as Jerry
- David Byron as Mike
- Lisa Robin Kelly as Charlie Greenwell's girlfriend
- Gary Hudson as Steve
- Rosanna Huffman as Lenore Walker

== Historical context ==
The film is largely based on interviews with Donna Yaklich. Real-life Dennis Yaklich was gunned down by two men in his Colorado driveway in 1985. The perpetrators were hired by Donna Yaklich. She was sentenced to 40 years in prison, but was released in 2009 after serving 18 years. The film has been criticized for fictionalizing the events and the way that the characters were portrayed. Vanessa Yaklich, one of Dennis and Barbara's children, not present in the movie, has spoken out about the film and Donna's claims to be an "outright lie".

== Production ==
Shooting began on November, 8 and concluded on December 3, 1993. In order to prepare for her role, Jaclyn Smith had phone conversations with Donna Yaklich. Smith attributed that the role was "definitely not sophisticated and slick"; she sometimes received real beatings on camera from her co-star Brad Johnson, because "it had to be real".

== Reception ==
The film received poor reviews. It was aired the day after a made-for-TV film with a similar story; Lies of the Heart: The Story of Laurie Kellogg (1994). A reviewer for People conducted that "Cries Unheard is only just better than Lies of the Heart."

Reviewer for Variety laid out his problems with the film: "First problem is credibility. The Smith-Johnson portrayal of the Yaklich courtship is flatly unbelievable; Smith appears much too chic and socially at opposite ends to fall for a greaseball like Johnson’s weightlifter. The vidpic’s second big problem is that, once ensconsed as his marital slave and punching bag, it’s not made clear why the wife is too afraid to run away but not too afraid to conspire to kill him. Viewer impatience with Smith’s mind-numbingly foolish homemaker is almost as great as the repulsion for Johnson’s hulking, gun-happy husband. In short, without a sympathetic, let alone empathetic wife figure, director Armand Mastroianni can’t overcome a grueling, almost counterproductive picture."

In its short review for The Gadsden Times, John Martin called the film "too sensational" and showed his dissatisfaction with contents, calling out for an effective way to help women get out of domestic violence, instead of showing "two hours of terror".
