= Online Film Critics Society Awards 1999 =

3rd Online Film Critics Society Awards

3rd Online Film Critics Society Awards

2000

Best Film:
American Beauty

The 3rd Online Film Critics Society Awards, honoring the best in film for 1999, were given in 2000.

== Winners and nominees ==
=== Best Picture ===
American Beauty

- Being John Malkovich
- Fight Club
- The Insider
- Toy Story 2

=== Best Director ===
Sam Mendes – American Beauty

- David Fincher – Fight Club
- Spike Jonze – Being John Malkovich
- Stanley Kubrick – Eyes Wide Shut
- Michael Mann – The Insider

=== Best Actor ===
Kevin Spacey – American Beauty

- Jim Carrey – Man on the Moon
- Russell Crowe – The Insider
- Richard Farnsworth – The Straight Story
- Edward Norton – Fight Club

=== Best Actress ===
Reese Witherspoon – Election

- Annette Bening – American Beauty
- Heather Donahue – The Blair Witch Project
- Janet McTeer – Tumbleweeds
- Hilary Swank – Boys Don't Cry

=== Best Supporting Actor ===
Haley Joel Osment – The Sixth Sense

- Wes Bentley – American Beauty
- Michael Clarke Duncan – The Green Mile
- John Malkovich – Being John Malkovich
- Christopher Plummer – The Insider

=== Best Supporting Actress ===
Catherine Keener – Being John Malkovich

- Thora Birch – American Beauty
- Cameron Diaz – Being John Malkovich
- Julianne Moore – Magnolia
- Chloë Sevigny – Boys Don't Cry

=== Best Original Screenplay ===
Being John Malkovich – Charlie Kaufman

- American Beauty – Alan Ball
- Magnolia – Paul Thomas Anderson
- The Sixth Sense – M. Night Shyamalan
- Toy Story 2 – Andrew Stanton, Rita Hsiao, Doug Chamberlain and Chris Webb

=== Best Adapted Screenplay ===
Election – Alexander Payne

- Fight Club – Jim Uhls
- The Green Mile – Frank Darabont
- The Insider – Eric Roth and Michael Mann
- The Talented Mr. Ripley – Anthony Minghella

=== Best Foreign Language Film ===
Run Lola Run

- All About My Mother
- The Dreamlife of Angels
- The Red Violin
- Xiu Xiu: The Sent Down Girl

=== Best Documentary ===
Buena Vista Social Club

- 42 Up
- American Movie
- Mr. Death: The Rise and Fall of Fred A. Leuchter, Jr.
- Trekkies

=== Best Cinematography ===
Sleepy Hollow – Emmanuel Lubezki

- American Beauty – Conrad L. Hall
- Eyes Wide Shut – Larry Smith
- The Straight Story – Freddie Francis
- Three Kings – Newton Thomas Sigel

=== Best Editing ===
Run Lola Run – Mathilde Bonnefoy

- American Beauty – Tariq Anwar and Christopher Greenbury
- Fight Club – James Haygood
- The Limey – Sarah Flack
- Three Kings – Robert K. Lambert

=== Best Ensemble ===
American Beauty

- Being John Malkovich
- Cradle Will Rock
- The Green Mile
- Magnolia

=== Best Original Score ===
South Park: Bigger, Longer & Uncut – Marc Shaiman

- American Beauty – Thomas Newman
- Eyes Wide Shut – Jocelyn Pook
- Star Wars: Episode I – The Phantom Menace – John Williams
- The Straight Story – Angelo Badalamenti

=== Best Debut ===
Spike Jonze – Being John Malkovich

- Charlie Kaufman – Being John Malkovich
- Sam Mendes – American Beauty
- Daniel Myrick and Eduardo Sánchez – The Blair Witch Project
- Haley Joel Osment – The Sixth Sense

=== Best Official Film Website ===
- Roger Ebert (suntimes.com/ebert/index.html)

=== Special OFCS Award ===
- Internet Movie Database
