= 57th Golden Globe Awards =

Film award ceremony in 2000

- Date: January 23, 2000
- Site: Beverly Hilton Hotel; Beverly Hills, Los Angeles, California

Highlights
- Best Film: Drama: American Beauty
- Best Film: Musical or Comedy: Toy Story 2
- Best Drama Series: The Sopranos
- Best Musical or Comedy Series: Sex and the City
- Most awards: (4) The Sopranos
- Most nominations: (6) American Beauty

Television coverage
- Network: NBC

The 57th Golden Globe Awards, honoring the best in film and television for 1999, took place on January 23, 2000. The nominations were announced on December 20, 1999.

== Winners and nominees ==
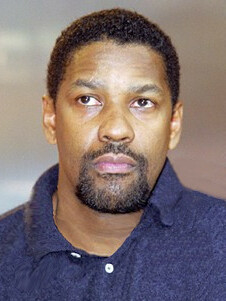
Denzel Washington, Best Actor in a Motion Picture – Drama winner

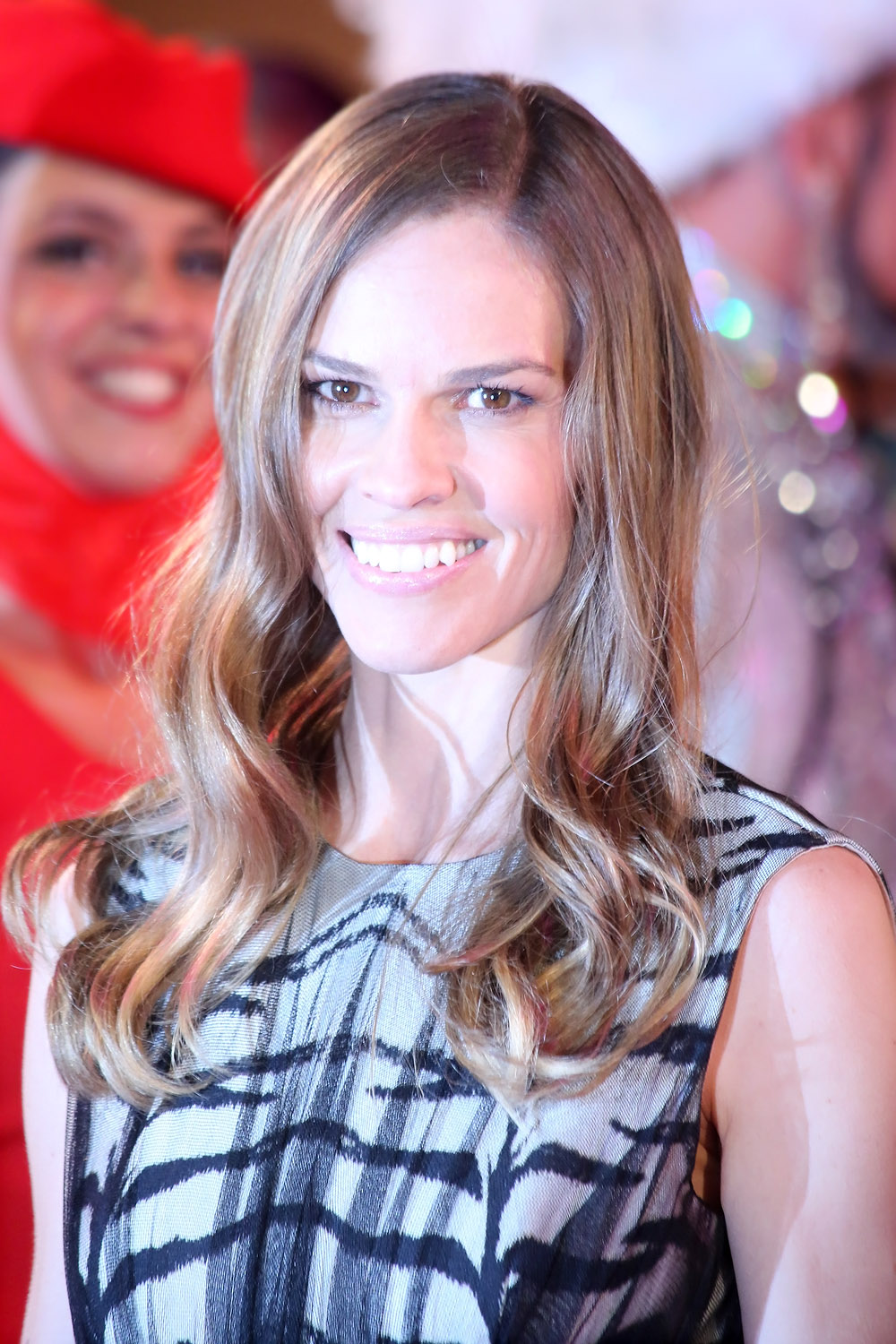
Hilary Swank, Best Actress in a Motion Picture – Drama winner

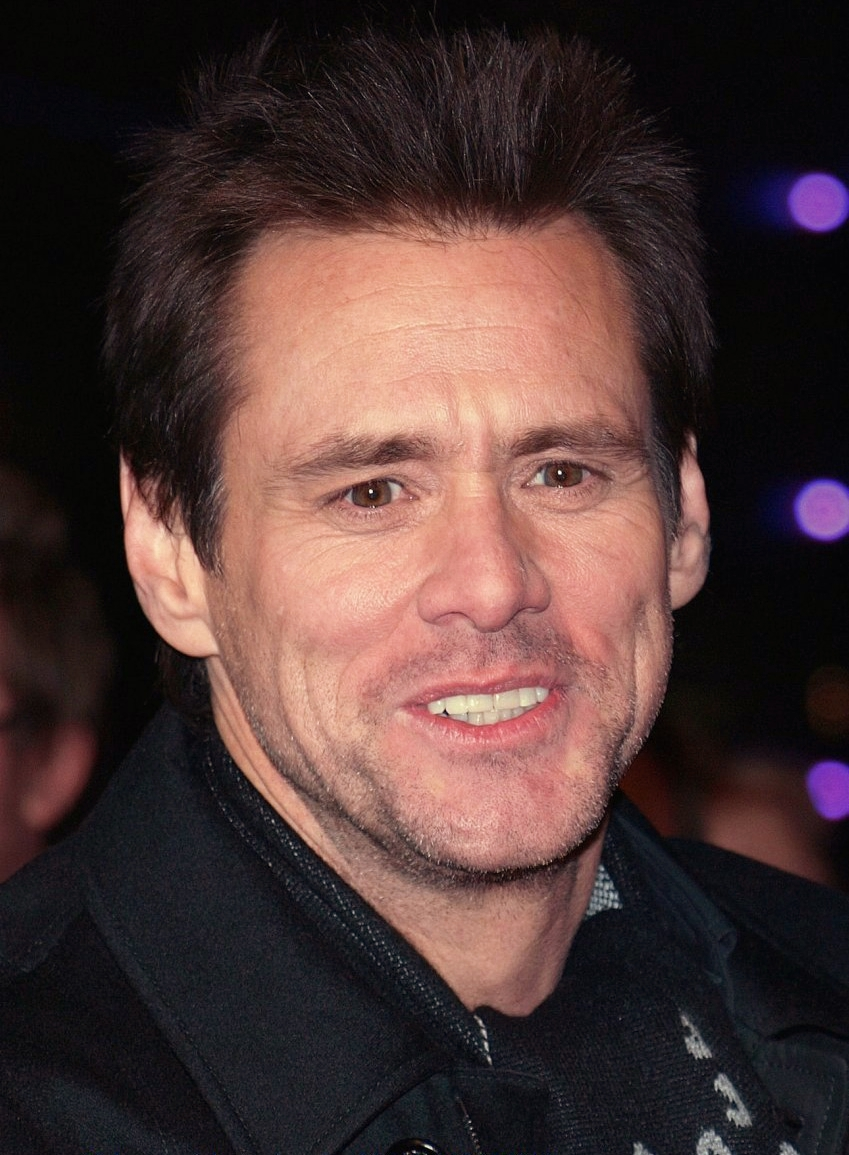
Jim Carrey, Best Actor in a Motion Picture – Musical or Comedy winner

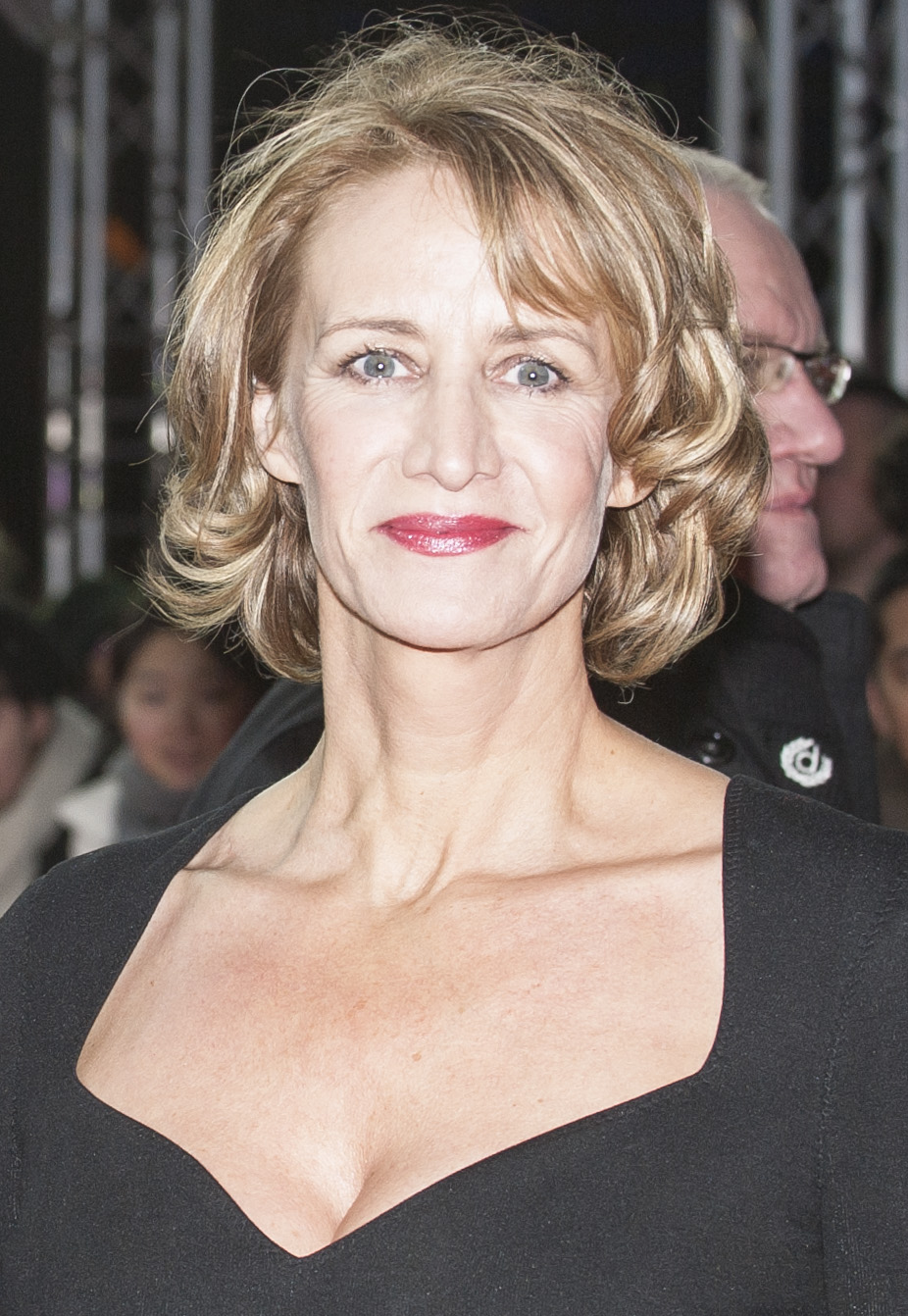
Janet McTeer, Best Actress in a Motion Picture – Musical or Comedy winner

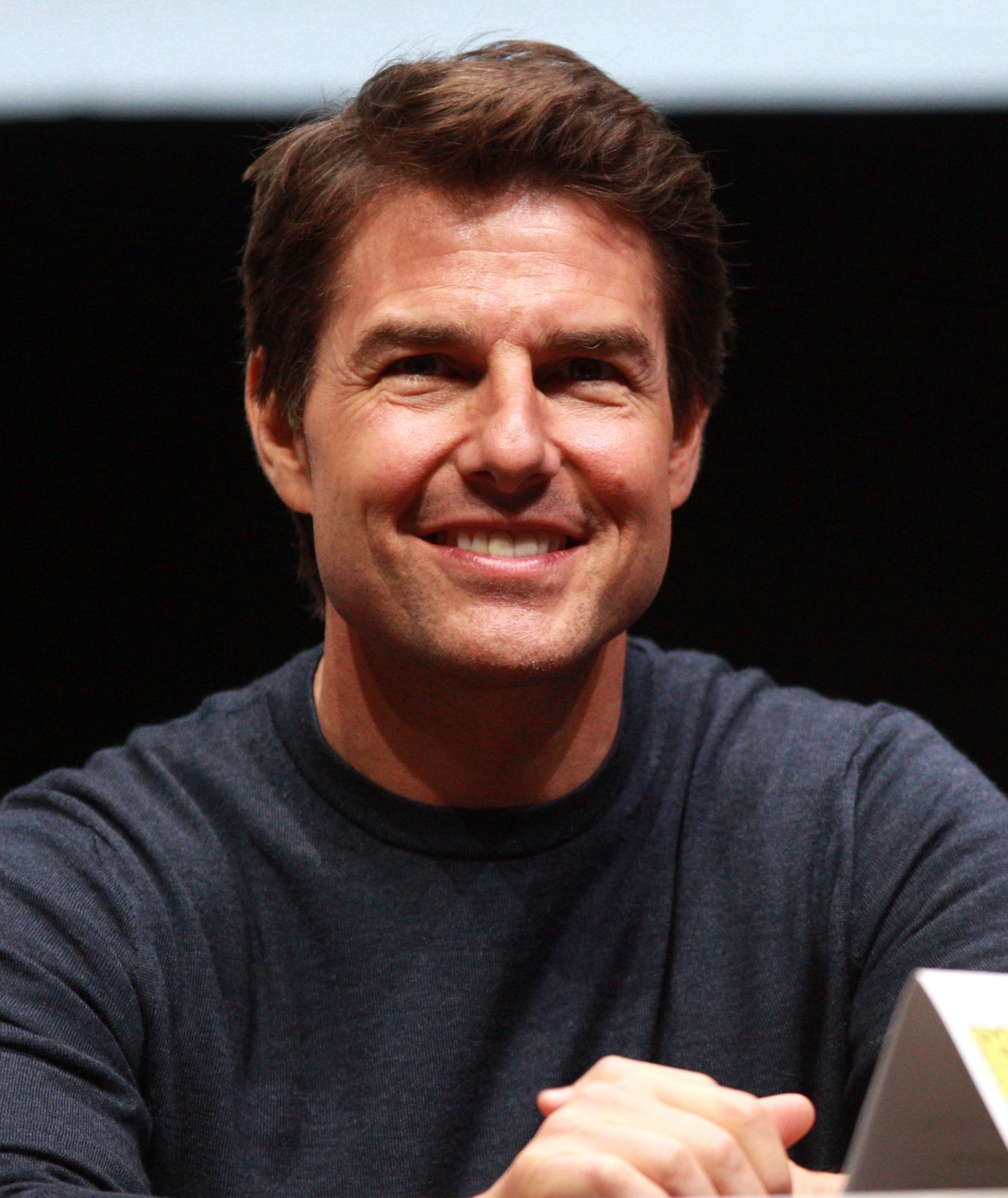
Tom Cruise, Best Supporting Actor winner

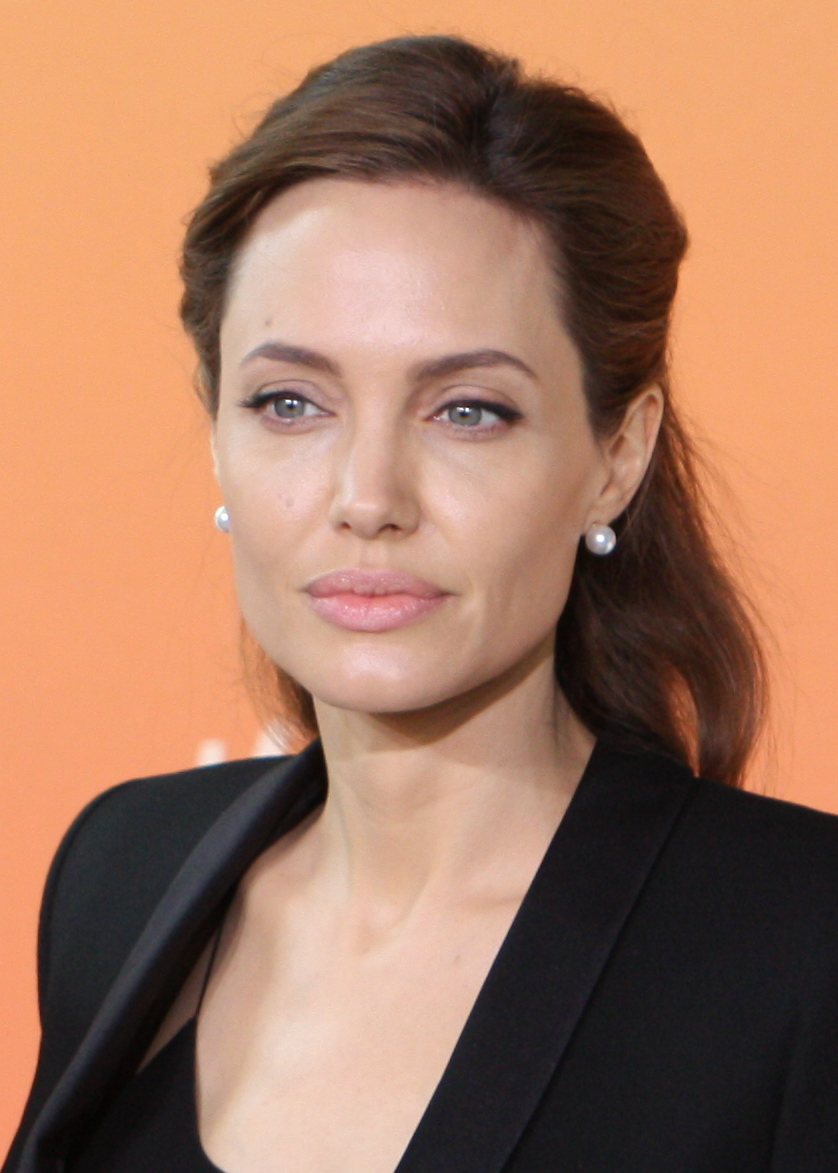
Angelina Jolie, Best Supporting Actress winner

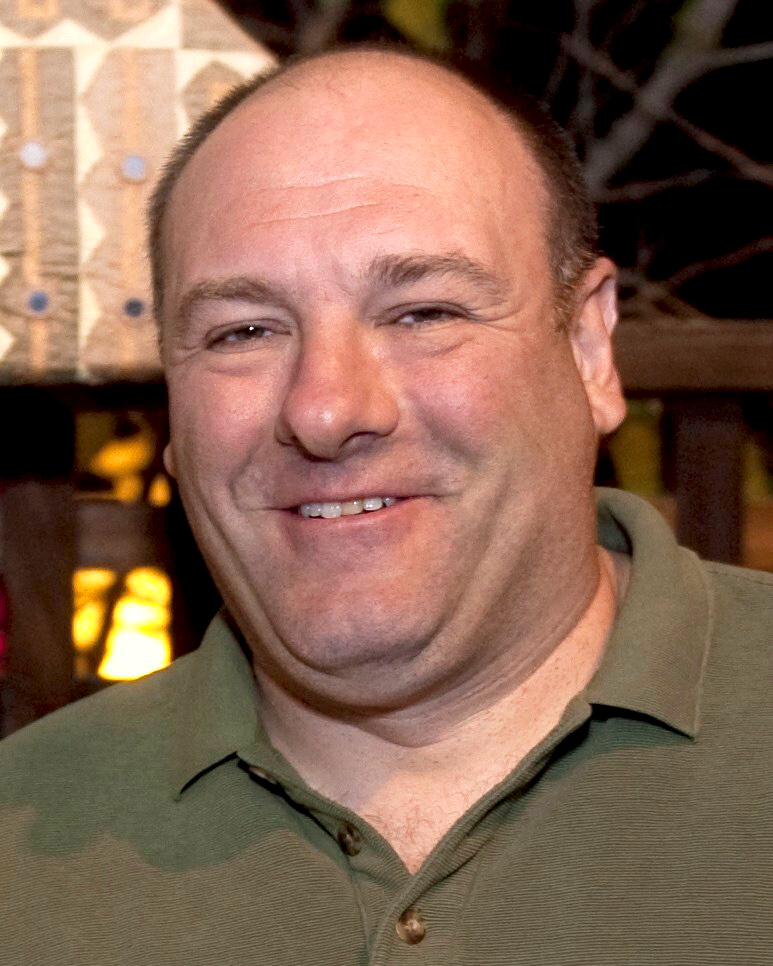
James Gandolfini, Best Actor in a Television Series – Drama winner

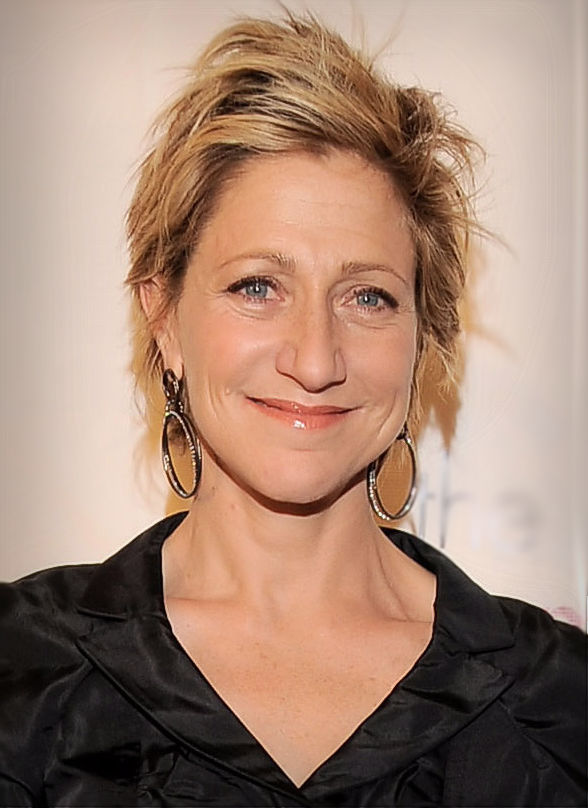
Edie Falco, Best Actress in a Television Series – Drama winner

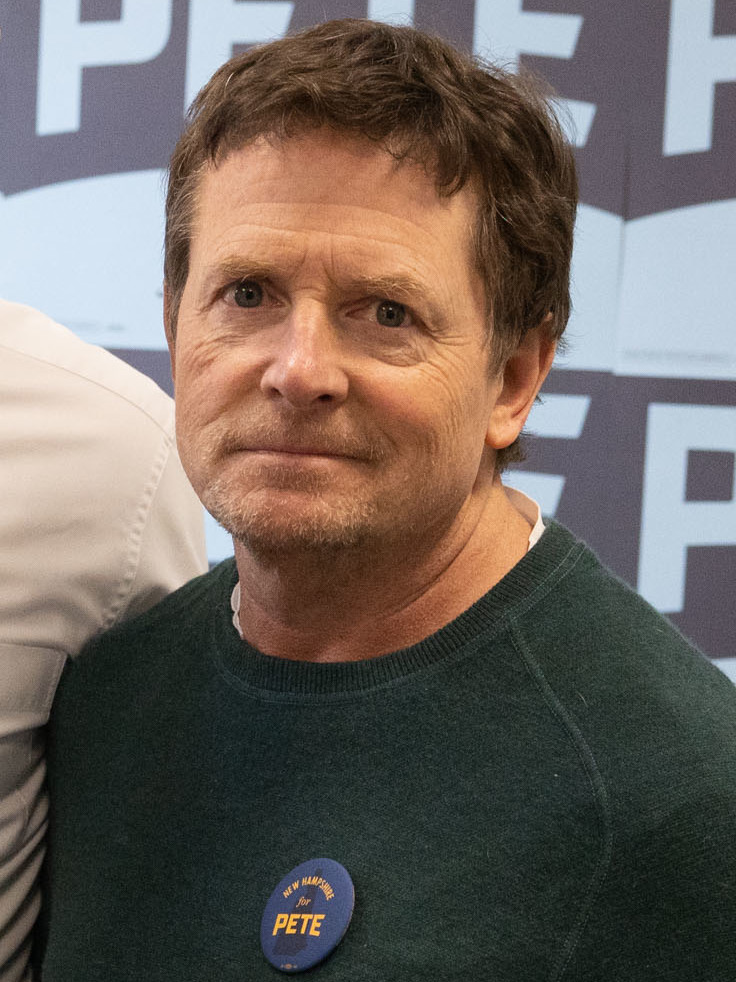
Michael J. Fox, Best Actor in a Television Series – Comedy or Musical winner

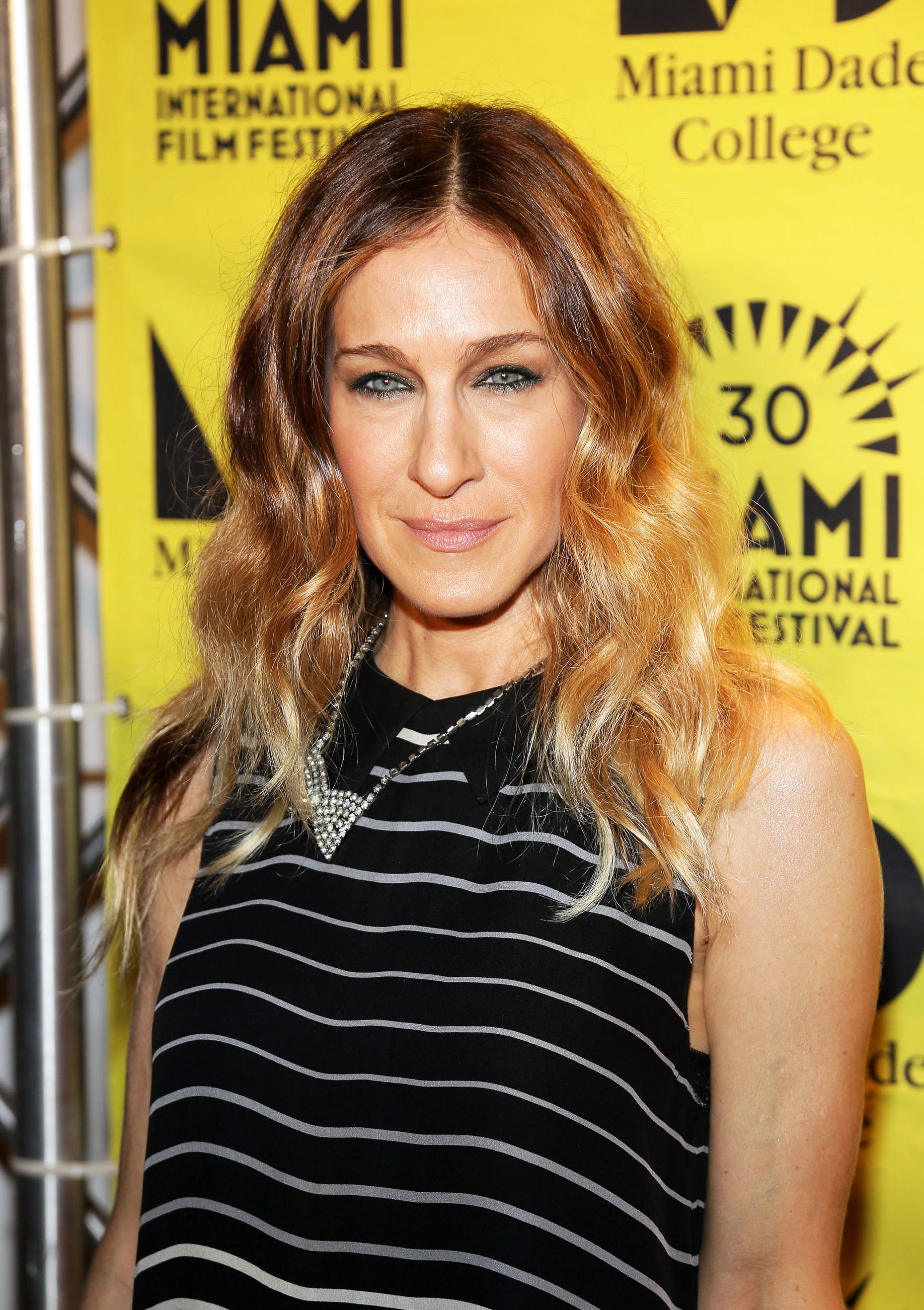
Sarah Jessica Parker, Best Actress in a Television Series – Comedy or Musical winner

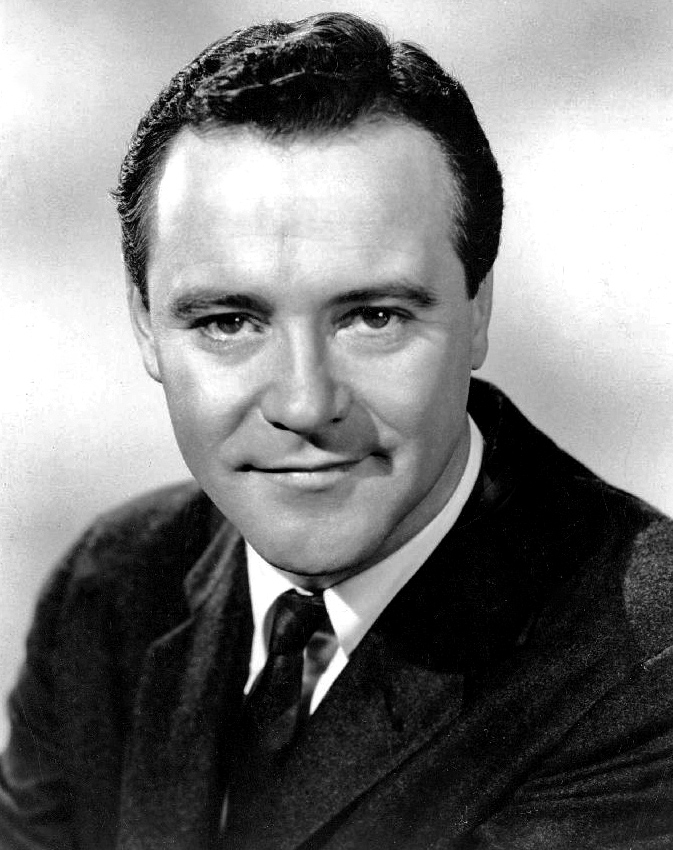
Jack Lemmon Best Actor in a Miniseries or Television Film winner

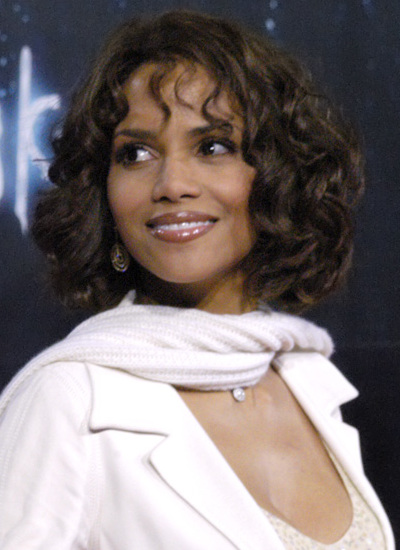
Halle Berry, Best Actress in a Miniseries or Television Film winner

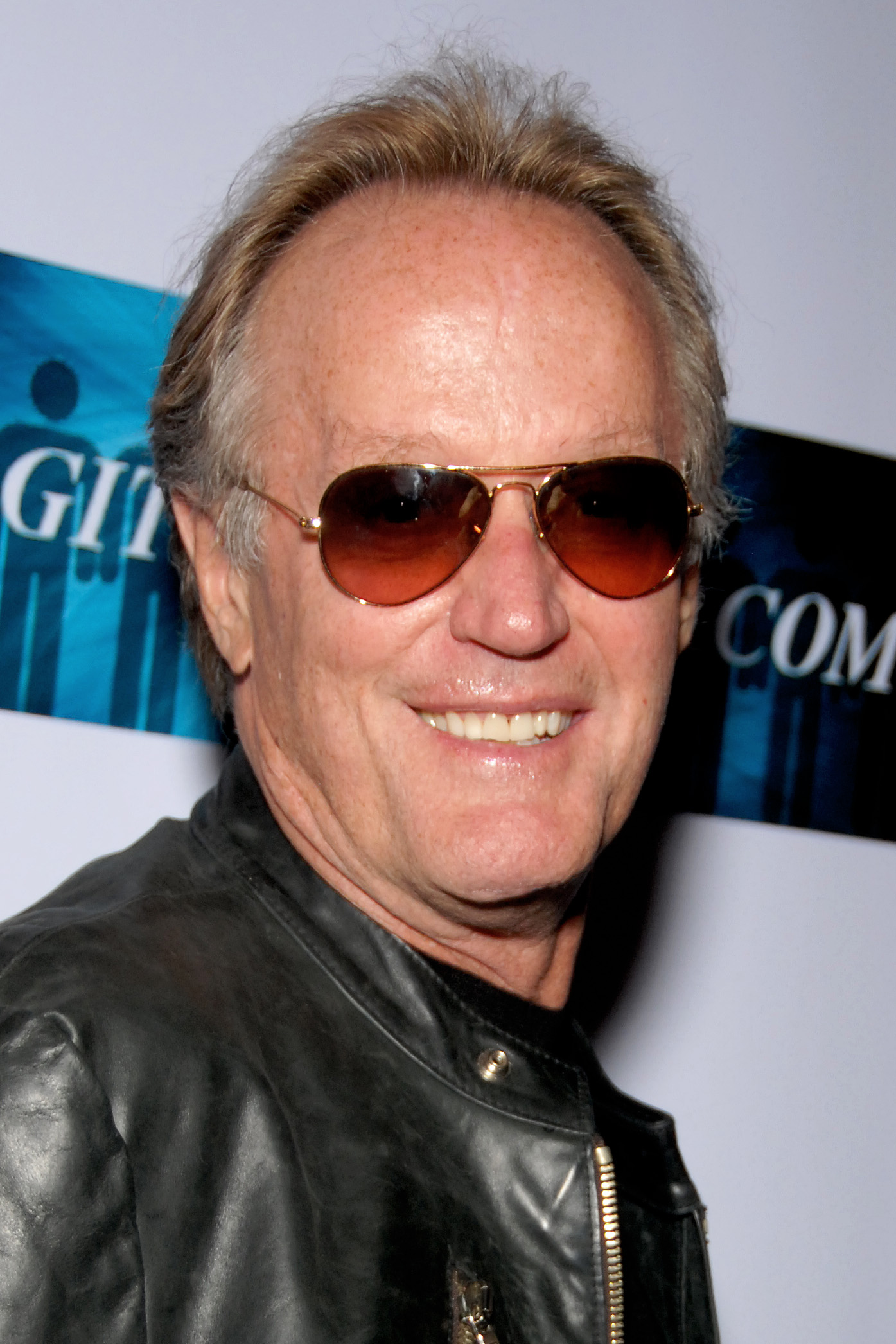
Peter Fonda, Best Supporting Actor in a Series, Miniseries, or Television Film winner

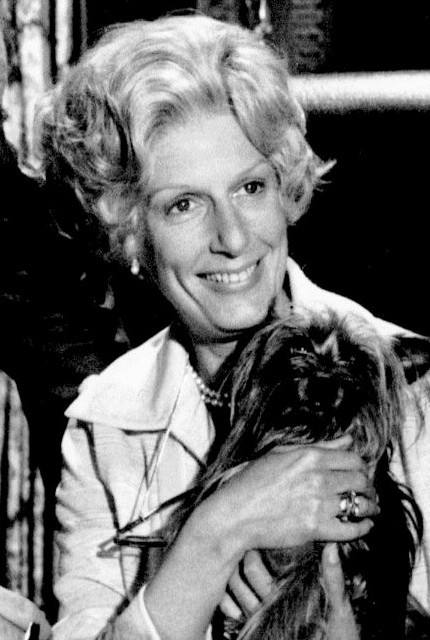
Nancy Marchand, Best Supporting Actress in a Series, Miniseries, or Television Film winner

=== Film ===
Best Motion Picture
Drama	Musical or Comedy
American Beauty: The End of the Affair; The Hurricane; The Insider; The Talented Mr. Ripley	Toy Story 2: Analyze This; Being John Malkovich; Man on the Moon; Notting Hill
Best Performance in a Motion Picture – Drama
Actor	Actress
Denzel Washington – The Hurricane as Rubin "The Hurricane" Carter: Russell Crowe – The Insider as Jeffrey Wigand; Matt Damon – The Talented Mr. Ripley as Tom Ripley; Richard Farnsworth – The Straight Story as Alvin Straight; Kevin Spacey – American Beauty as Lester Burnham	Hilary Swank – Boys Don't Cry as Brandon Teena: Annette Bening – American Beauty as Carolyn Burnham; Julianne Moore – The End of the Affair as Sarah Miles; Meryl Streep – Music of the Heart as Roberta Guaspari; Sigourney Weaver – A Map of the World as Alice Goodwin
Best Performance in a Motion Picture – Musical or Comedy
Actor	Actress
Jim Carrey – Man on the Moon as Andy Kaufman: Robert De Niro – Analyze This as Paul Vitti; Rupert Everett – An Ideal Husband as Lord Arthur Goring; Hugh Grant – Notting Hill as William "Will" Thacker; Sean Penn – Sweet and Lowdown as Emmet Ray	Janet McTeer – Tumbleweeds as Mary Jo Walker: Julianne Moore – An Ideal Husband as Laura Cheveley; Julia Roberts – Notting Hill as Anna Scott; Sharon Stone – The Muse as Sarah Little; Reese Witherspoon – Election as Tracy Flick
Best Supporting Performance in a Motion Picture – Drama, Musical or Comedy
Supporting Actor	Supporting Actress
Tom Cruise – Magnolia as Frank T.J. Mackey: Michael Caine – The Cider House Rules as Dr. Wilbur Larch; Michael Clarke Duncan – The Green Mile as John Coffey; Jude Law – The Talented Mr. Ripley as Dickie Greenleaf; Haley Joel Osment – The Sixth Sense as Cole Sear	Angelina Jolie – Girl, Interrupted as Lisa Rowe: Cameron Diaz – Being John Malkovich as Lotte Schwartz; Catherine Keener – Being John Malkovich as Maxine Lund; Samantha Morton – Sweet and Lowdown as Hattie; Natalie Portman – Anywhere But Here as Ann August; Chloë Sevigny – Boys Don't Cry as Lana Tisdel
Best Director	Best Screenplay
Sam Mendes – American Beauty: Norman Jewison – The Hurricane; Neil Jordan – The End of the Affair; Michael Mann – The Insider; Anthony Minghella – The Talented Mr. Ripley	American Beauty – Alan Ball: Being John Malkovich – Charlie Kaufman; The Cider House Rules – John Irving; The Insider – Michael Mann and Eric Roth; The Sixth Sense – M. Night Shyamalan
Best Original Score	Best Original Song
The Legend of 1900 – Ennio Morricone: American Beauty – Thomas Newman; Angela's Ashes – John Williams; Anna and the King – George Fenton; The End of the Affair – Michael Nyman; Eyes Wide Shut – Jocelyn Pook; The Insider – Pieter Bourke and Lisa Gerrard; The Straight Story – Angelo Badalamenti; The Talented Mr. Ripley – Gabriel Yared	"You'll Be in My Heart" performed by Phil Collins – Tarzan: "Beautiful Stranger" performed by Madonna – Austin Powers: The Spy Who Shagged Me; "How Can I Not Love You" performed by Joy Enriquez – Anna and the King; "Save Me" performed by Aimee Mann – Magnolia; "When She Loved Me" performed by Sarah McLachlan – Toy Story 2
Best Foreign Language Film	
All About My Mother (Todo sobre mi madre), Spain: Aimée & Jaguar, Germany; East/West (Est-Ouest), Bulgaria/France/Russia/Spain; Girl on the Bridge (La fille sur le pont), France; The Red Violin (Le violon rouge), Canada/Italy	

The following films received multiple nominations:

Nominations	Title
6	American Beauty
5	The Talented Mr. Ripley
5	The Insider
4	Being John Malkovich
4	The End of the Affair
3	The Hurricane
3	Notting Hill
2	An Ideal Husband
2	Analyze This
2	Anna and the King
2	Boys Don't Cry
2	The Cider House Rules
2	Magnolia
2	Man on the Moon
2	The Sixth Sense
2	Toy Story 2
2	The Straight Story
2	Sweet and Lowdown

The following films received multiple wins:

Wins	Title
3	American Beauty

=== Television ===
Best Television Series
Best Television Series - Drama	Best Television Series - Comedy or Musical
The Sopranos: ER; Once and Again; The Practice; The West Wing	Sex and the City: Ally McBeal; Dharma & Greg; Spin City; Will & Grace
Best Lead Actor in a Television Series
Best Actor - Drama Series	Best Actor - Comedy or Musical Series
James Gandolfini as Tony Soprano – The Sopranos: Billy Campbell – Once and Again; Rob Lowe – The West Wing; Dylan McDermott – The Practice; Martin Sheen – The West Wing	Michael J. Fox – Spin City: Thomas Gibson as Greg – Dharma & Greg; Eric McCormack as Will Truman – Will & Grace; Ray Romano as Ray – Everybody Loves Raymond; George Segal – Just Shoot Me!
Best Lead Actress in a Television Series
Best Actress - Drama Series	Best Actress - Comedy or Musical Series
Edie Falco – The Sopranos: Lorraine Bracco – The Sopranos; Amy Brenneman – Judging Amy; Julianna Margulies – ER; Sela Ward – Once and Again	Sarah Jessica Parker as Carrie Bradshaw – Sex and the City: Jenna Elfman as Dharma – Dharma & Greg; Calista Flockhart as Ally McBeal – Ally McBeal; Felicity Huffman – Sports Night; Heather Locklear – Spin City; Debra Messing as Grace Adler – Will & Grace
Best Supporting Performance - Series, Miniseries or Television Movie
Best Supporting Actor - Series, Miniseries or Television Movie	Best Supporting Actress - Series, Miniseries or Television Movie
Peter Fonda – The Passion of Ayn Rand: Klaus Maria Brandauer – Introducing Dorothy Dandridge; Sean Hayes as Jack MacFarland – Will & Grace; Chris Noth as Mr. Big – Sex and the City; Peter O'Toole – Joan of Arc; David Spade – Just Shoot Me!	Nancy Marchand – The Sopranos: Kathy Bates – Annie; Jacqueline Bisset – Joan of Arc; Kim Cattrall – Sex and the City; Melanie Griffith – RKO 281; Cynthia Nixon – Sex and the City; Miranda Richardson – The Big Brass Ring
Best Actor - Miniseries or Television Film	Best Actress - Miniseries or Television Film
Jack Lemmon – Inherit the Wind: Jack Lemmon – Tuesdays with Morrie; Liev Schreiber – RKO 281; Sam Shepard – Dash and Lilly; Tom Sizemore – Witness Protection	Halle Berry as Dorothy Dandridge – Introducing Dorothy Dandridge: Judy Davis – Dash and Lilly; Mia Farrow – Forget Me Never; Helen Mirren – The Passion of Ayn Rand; Leelee Sobieski – Joan of Arc
Best Miniseries or Television Film	
RKO 281: Dash and Lilly; Introducing Dorothy Dandridge; Joan of Arc; Witness Protection	

The following programs received multiple nominations:

Nominations	Title
5	The Sopranos
5	Sex and the City
4	Joan of Arc
4	Will & Grace
3	Dharma & Greg
3	Introducing Dorothy Dandridge
3	Once and Again
3	RKO 281
3	Spin City
3	The West Wing
3	Dash and Lilly
2	Ally McBeal
2	ER
2	Just Shoot Me!
2	The Passion of Ayn Rand
2	The Practice
2	Witness Protection

The following programs received multiple wins:

Wins	Title
4	The Sopranos
2	Sex and the City

== Ceremony ==
=== Presenters ===
- Ben Affleck
- Alec Baldwin
- Antonio Banderas
- Angela Bassett
- Lara Flynn Boyle
- Lorraine Bracco
- Rubin Carter
- Michael Douglas
- Minnie Driver
- David James Elliott
- Edie Falco
- Harrison Ford
- Vivica A. Fox
- Morgan Freeman
- James Gandolfini
- Hugh Grant
- Seth Green
- Mariska Hargitay
- Jennifer Love Hewitt
- Diane Lane
- Lucy Liu
- LL Cool J
- Courtney Love
- Shirley MacLaine
- Tobey Maguire
- Dylan McDermott
- Liam Neeson
- Gwyneth Paltrow
- Dennis Quaid
- Julia Roberts
- Ray Romano
- Keri Russell
- Winona Ryder
- Claudia Schiffer
- George Segal
- Martin Sheen
- Steven Spielberg
- Charlize Theron
- Renée Zellweger

=== Cecil B. DeMille Award ===
Barbra Streisand

=== Miss Golden Globe ===
Liza Huber (daughter of Susan Lucci & Helmut Huber)

== Awards breakdown ==
The following networks received multiple nominations:

Nominations	Network
17	HBO
14	ABC
11	NBC
7	CBS
4	Showtime
2	A&E
2	Fox

The following networks received multiple wins:

Wins	Network
6	HBO

== See also ==
- 72nd Academy Awards
- 20th Golden Raspberry Awards
- 6th Screen Actors Guild Awards
- 51st Primetime Emmy Awards
- 52nd Primetime Emmy Awards
- 53rd British Academy Film Awards
- 54th Tony Awards
- 1999 in film
- 1999 in American television
