= 1999 New York Film Critics Circle Awards =

65th New York Film Critics Circle Awards

65th New York Film Critics Circle Awards

January 9, 2000

Best Picture:
Topsy-Turvy

The 65th New York Film Critics Circle Awards, honoring the best in film for 1999, were announced on 16 December 1999 and presented on 9 January 2000 by the New York Film Critics Circle.

== Winners ==
- Best Actor:
  - Richard Farnsworth – The Straight Story
  - Runners-up: Russell Crowe – The Insider and Jim Broadbent – Topsy-Turvy
- Best Actress:
  - Hilary Swank – Boys Don't Cry
  - Runners-up: Julianne Moore – The End of the Affair and Janet McTeer – Tumbleweeds
- Best Animated Film:
  - South Park: Bigger, Longer & Uncut
  - Runners-up: The Iron Giant and Toy Story 2
- Best Cinematography:
  - Freddie Francis – The Straight Story
  - Runner-up: Emmanuel Lubezki – Sleepy Hollow
- Best Director:
  - Mike Leigh – Topsy-Turvy
  - Runners-up: David Lynch – The Straight Story and Sam Mendes – American Beauty
- Best Film:
  - Topsy-Turvy
  - Runners-up: American Beauty, Being John Malkovich and The Straight Story
- Best First Film:
  - Spike Jonze – Being John Malkovich
  - Runners-up: Kimberly Peirce – Boys Don't Cry and Sam Mendes – American Beauty
- Best Foreign Language Film:
  - All About My Mother (Todo sobre mi madre) • Spain/France
- Best Non-Fiction Film:
  - Buena Vista Social Club
  - Runner-up: Mr. Death: The Rise and Fall of Fred A. Leuchter, Jr.
- Best Screenplay:
  - Alexander Payne and Jim Taylor – Election
- Best Supporting Actor:
  - John Malkovich – Being John Malkovich
  - Runners-up: Jamie Foxx – Any Given Sunday and Christopher Plummer – The Insider
- Best Supporting Actress:
  - Catherine Keener – Being John Malkovich
  - Runner-up: Chloë Sevigny – Boys Don't Cry
- Special Award:
  - Manny Farber
