= 1999 Los Angeles Film Critics Association Awards =

Annual US film awards ceremony

25th LAFCA Awards
- Date: December 1999

Highlights
- Best Picture: The Insider

The 25th Los Angeles Film Critics Association Awards, honoring the best in film for 1999, were announced on December 11, 1999 and awarded on January 19, 2000.

== Winners ==
- Best Picture:
  - The Insider
  - Runner-up: American Beauty
- Best Director:
  - Sam Mendes – American Beauty
  - Runner-up: Michael Mann – The Insider
- Best Actor:
  - Russell Crowe – The Insider
  - Runner-up: Richard Farnsworth – The Straight Story
- Best Actress:
  - Hilary Swank – Boys Don't Cry
  - Runner-up: Reese Witherspoon – Election
- Best Supporting Actor:
  - Christopher Plummer – The Insider
  - Runner-up: John Malkovich – Being John Malkovich
- Best Supporting Actress:
  - Chloë Sevigny – Boys Don't Cry
  - Runner-up: Samantha Morton – Sweet and Lowdown
- Best Screenplay:
  - Charlie Kaufman – Being John Malkovich
  - Runner-up: Alan Ball – American Beauty
- Best Cinematography:
  - Dante Spinotti – The Insider
  - Runner-up: Conrad L. Hall – American Beauty
- Best Production Design:
  - Rick Heinrichs – Sleepy Hollow
  - Runner-up: Dante Ferretti – Titus
- Best Music Score:
  - Trey Parker and Marc Shaiman – South Park: Bigger, Longer & Uncut
  - Runner-up: Gabriel Yared – The Talented Mr. Ripley
- Best Foreign-Language Film:
  - All About My Mother (Todo sobre mi madre) • Spain
  - Runner-up: The Dreamlife of Angels (La vie rêvée des anges) • France
- Best Non-Fiction Film:
  - Buena Vista Social Club
  - Runner-up: Mr. Death: The Rise and Fall of Fred A. Leuchter, Jr.
- Best Animation:
  - The Iron Giant
- The Douglas Edwards Experimental/Independent Film/Video Award:
  - Owen Land
- New Generation Award:
  - Alexander Payne and Jim Taylor – Citizen Ruth and Election
- Career Achievement Award:
  - Dede Allen
- Special Citation:
  - Rick Schmidlin, Roger Mayer, and Turner Classic Movies for their meticulous reconstruction and promotion of Erich von Stroheim's Greed
