= The Straight Story =

1999 film by David Lynch

- Theatrical release poster
- Directed by: David Lynch
- Written by: John Roach; Mary Sweeney
- Produced by: Mary Sweeney; Neal Edelstein; Alain Sarde
- Starring: Richard Farnsworth; Sissy Spacek; Harry Dean Stanton
- Cinematography: Freddie Francis
- Edited by: Mary Sweeney
- Music by: Angelo Badalamenti
- Production companies: Les Films Alain Sarde; Le Studio Canal+; The Picture Company; FilmFour
- Distributed by: Buena Vista Pictures Distribution (Note: Distributed under the Walt Disney Pictures banner.) (United States); FilmFour Distributors (United Kingdom); BAC Films (France)
- Release dates: May 21, 1999 (Cannes); October 15, 1999 (United States)
- Running time: 112 minutes
- Countries: United States; United Kingdom; France
- Language: English
- Budget: $10 million
- Box office: $6.2 million (United States)

The Straight Story (stylised as the Straight story) is a 1999 biographical road drama film directed by David Lynch. It was edited and produced by Mary Sweeney, Lynch's longtime filmmaking partner and collaborator, who also co-wrote the script with John E. Roach. It is based on the true story of Alvin Straight's 1994 journey across Iowa and Wisconsin on a lawn mower. In contrast to Lynch's usual work featuring surrealist imagery and adult themes, The Straight Story was produced and marketed as a family-friendly mainstream feature and was the only Lynch film to receive a G rating from the MPAA.

Alvin (Richard Farnsworth) is an elderly World War II veteran who lives with his daughter. When he hears that his estranged brother has suffered a stroke, Alvin makes up his mind to visit him and hopefully make amends before he dies. Because Alvin's legs and eyes are too impaired for him to hold a driver's license, he hitches a trailer to a thirty-year-old lawn tractor, which has a maximum speed of 5 miles per hour (2.2 m/s; 8.0 km/h), and sets off on the 240-mile (390 km) journey from Laurens, Iowa, to Mount Zion, Wisconsin.

The Straight Story was released by Walt Disney Pictures in the United States and select international territories. The film was a critical success; reviewers praised the intensity of the character performances, particularly the realistic dialogue which film critic Roger Ebert compared to the works of Ernest Hemingway. It received a nomination for the Palme d'Or at the 1999 Cannes Film Festival and Farnsworth received a nomination for the Academy Award for Best Actor, becoming the oldest nominee in the category at the time.

== Plot ==
In Laurens, Iowa, elderly Alvin Straight is found lying on his kitchen floor after a fall. His daughter, Rose, takes him to see a doctor, who admonishes him to give up tobacco, improve his diet, and use a walker, all of which he rejects. When Alvin's brother, Lyle, suffers a stroke, Alvin decides to visit him, even though they have not spoken in ten years.

Lyle lives in Mount Zion, Wisconsin, 240 miles away. As neither Alvin (due to his age) nor Rose (due to an unspecified disability) has a driver's license, Alvin decides to make the trip on his riding mower. His plan surprises his family, friends, and neighbors. The mower soon breaks down, forcing Alvin to accept a ride from a passing tour bus and call for help. However, he is determined to continue the trip, and buys a used 1966 John Deere 110 lawn tractor to continue his journey.

Alvin meets a variety of people on the road. He shares his dinner with a young girl hitchhiker, who ran away from home out of fear that her family would be upset with her pregnancy. Alvin reflects on the importance of family, noting how he lost half of his kids and how Rose lost custody of her children after a fire occurred in her house while she was out, later remarking that a bundle of sticks tied together is harder to break than a single one; the next day, she leaves him the former as thanks. Several passing RAGBRAI cyclists are amused to see him on the highway and welcome him to their campsite. He speaks with some of the cyclists about growing old. He also meets a distraught woman who hit a deer during her commute and tearfully rants about how she repeatedly hits deer despite her prayers. Alvin respectfully cooks and eats the deer.

Alvin's tractor begins to fail, throwing his journey into jeopardy. His transmission fails as he travels down a steep hill, but he manages to stop. Danny, a local, invites Alvin to camp in his backyard until the tractor is repaired. He offers to drive Alvin to Mount Zion, but Alvin declines, preferring to travel his own way.

Running low on cash, Alvin calls Rose to send him his Social Security check. Two bickering local mechanics overcharge him for fixing his tractor, but he cannily bargains the price down. A fellow veteran invites Alvin for a drink, and they exchange traumatic stories about their experiences in World War II. Alvin, a sniper during the war, declines a beer but confesses that he is still haunted by killing an American in a friendly fire incident, becoming an alcoholic when he returned home but is now sober.

After crossing into Wisconsin, Alvin chats with a Catholic priest who knows of Lyle and his stroke. The priest states that Lyle never mentioned a brother; Alvin admits that he wants to make amends. Although the exact cause of the brothers' estrangement is never stated, Alvin says that anger, vanity and alcohol were involved.

Alvin finally arrives in Mount Zion. To steel himself, he drinks his first beer in years. His tractor stalls just short of Lyle's dilapidated cabin, but he persists. Lyle invites Alvin to sit together on the porch; asking if Alvin rode the tractor all the way just to see him. Alvin quietly confirms this as Lyle's eyes well up with tears. The two men sit together silently and gaze up at the stars.

== Cast ==
- Richard Farnsworth as Alvin Straight
- Sissy Spacek as Rose Straight
- Harry Dean Stanton as Lyle Straight
- Everett McGill as Tom the John Deere Dealer
- John Farley as Thorvald Olsen
- Kevin Farley as Harald Olsen
- Jane Galloway Heitz as Dorothy
- Joseph Carpenter as Bud
- Donald Wiegert as Sig
- Ed Grennan as Pete
- Jack Walsh as Apple
- Dan Flannery as Doctor Gibbons
- Anastasia Webb as Crystal (the hitchhiking runaway)
- Barbara Robertson as Deer woman
- James Cada as Danny Riordan
- Sally Wingert as Darla Riordan
- Wiley Harker as Verlyn Heller
- John Lordan as Priest
- Russ Reed as Barkeeper in Mt. Zion
- Max the Wonder Dog as Farm Dog

== Production ==
=== Development ===
In 1994, 73-year-old Alvin Straight rode a lawnmower across roughly 250 miles of the American Midwest to visit his ailing brother. Mary Sweeney, David Lynch's frequent collaborator, read about Straight's story in The New York Times that summer. Said Sweeney, "Growing up in Wisconsin, I easily connected with that kind of stoic, non-verbal, stubborn, idiosyncratic American character. I get how hard it is to have quiet pride and dignity when you're old and poor and are living in the middle of nowhere. I understand what these people's dreams and frustrations are. And I loved how much his journey captured the national imagination, so, wearing my producer's hat, I started trying to secure the rights."

Producer Ray Stark had already acquired the rights to Straight's story and envisioned the project as a potential star vehicle for Paul Newman. Straight died in 1996, and the rights to his story became available again. Sweeney co-wrote the script with John Roach, a childhood friend; the two retraced Straight's route in the process of writing. When Lynch saw the finished script he immediately took to it, saying "it became, for me, very real."

=== Casting ===
For the role of Alvin Straight, producers cast their first choice, Richard Farnsworth. Though he was reluctant to commit to the role as he was then terminally ill with metastatic prostate cancer, he took the role out of admiration for Straight. Sissy Spacek, a longtime friend of Lynch's who had helped to finance his earlier film Eraserhead, was cast as Alvin's daughter, Rose. Harry Dean Stanton was cast as Alvin's ailing brother.

=== Filming ===
The Straight Story was independently shot along the actual route taken by Straight, and all scenes were shot in chronological order in the autumn of 1998. Alvin Straight's real-life residence was used as his home in the film and Straight's neighbors in the film were his actual neighbors. Lynch would later call the film "my most experimental movie".

During production, Farnsworth's cancer had spread to his bones, but he astonished his co-workers with his tenacity during production. The paralysis of his legs as shown in the film was real. Farnsworth died by suicide on October 6, 2000, at the age of 80.

=== Music ===
The musical score for The Straight Story was composed by Angelo Badalamenti, continuing a 13-plus year collaboration with Lynch that began with Blue Velvet. A soundtrack album was released on October 12, 1999, by Windham Hill Records.

The Straight Story

Soundtrack album by Angelo Badalamenti
- Released: October 12, 1999
- Recorded: Asymmetrical Studio, Hollywood
- Length: 48:09
- Label: Windham Hill

Professional ratings
Review scores
Source	Rating
AllMusic	4/5 stars
Q	3/5 stars
Uncut	5/5 stars

=== Soundtrack ===
All music composed and conducted by Angelo Badalamenti.

The Straight Story: Music from the Motion Picture Soundtrack
No.	Title	Length
1.	"Laurens, Iowa"	2:45
2.	"Rose's Theme"	2:55
3.	"Laurens Walking"	4:11
4.	"Sprinkler"	2:56
5.	"Alvin's Theme"	4:25
6.	"Final Miles"	4:06
7.	"Country Waltz"	2:46
8.	"Rose's Theme"	3:07
9.	"Country Theme"	3:38
10.	"Crystal"	4:07
11.	"Nostalgia"	6:51
12.	"Farmland Tour"	3:09
13.	"Montage"	7:24
Total length:		48:09

== Release ==
The Straight Story was released by Walt Disney Pictures in the United States and select international territories. The film grossed $6.2 million in a limited theatrical release in the United States and sold 516,597 tickets nationwide during France's theatrical release.

After a successful debut at Cannes, Buena Vista Pictures Distribution acquired distribution rights to the film in the United States, Australia and Scandivanian territories, where it would be released under the Walt Disney Pictures banner, while Le Studio Canal+ and Les Films Alain Sarde would share international sales. It was Peter Schneider, Disney's president of production at the time, that got the idea to have the studio acquire the film after seeing it at Cannes, calling it "a beautiful movie about values, forgiveness and healing and celebrates America. As soon as I saw it, I knew it was a Walt Disney film." October Films also negotiated for the rights, but a deal never materialized. The film was given a G rating by the MPAA (the only Lynch film to receive such a rating).

=== Home media ===
The Straight Story was released on DVD on November 7, 2000 by Buena Vista Home Entertainment (under the Walt Disney Home Video label). There are no chapter markers on the original North American DVD release, with a note written by Lynch inside the DVD case that reads, "It is my opinion that a film is not a book – it should not be broken up. It is a continuum and should be seen as such." On April 3, 2020, the film became available to stream on Disney+.

On September 17, 2021, The Straight Story received a limited edition Blu-ray release from Imprint Films.

On December 17, 2025, StudioCanal announced that a new 4K Ultra HD restoration of the film will be released on both 4K Ultra HD and Blu-ray discs in the United Kingdom beginning February 9, 2026.

== Reception ==
=== Critical reception ===
The Straight Story was critically acclaimed upon its release, with critics lauding Lynch's uncharacteristic subject matter. Entertainment Weekly described the film as a "celestial piece of Americana." The Chicago Tribune wrote of the film, "we see something American studio movies usually don't give us: the simple, unsentimentalized beauty of the rural American Midwestern landscape."

Janet Maslin of The New York Times wrote, "The same bellwether quality that left Blue Velvet looking so prescient, and ushered in a whole cinematic wave of taboo-shattering, is at work once again. When a born unnaturalist like Lynch can bring such interest and emotion to one man's simple story, the realm of the ordinary starts looking like a new frontier." Of Farnsworth's performance, Maslin wrote, "he automatically frees the film from any sense of artifice and delivers an amazingly stalwart performance that will not soon be forgotten." Her review concluded, "The Straight Story is...about gazing at the sky, about experiencing each encounter to the fullest, than it is about getting anywhere in a hurry. It's been too long since a great American movie dared to regard life that way."

Roger Ebert gave the film four out of four stars, the first positive review he had given to a film by Lynch. He wrote: "The first time I saw The Straight Story I focused on the foreground and liked it. The second time I focused on the background, too, and loved it. The movie isn't just about the old Alvin Straight's odyssey through the sleepy towns and rural districts of the Midwest, but about the people he finds to listen and care for him."

On review aggregator Rotten Tomatoes, the film has an approval rating of 95% based on 116 reviews, with an average rating of 8.6/10. The website's critical consensus reads, "With strong performances and director David Lynch at the helm, The Straight Story steers past sentimental byways on its ambling journey across the American heartland." On Metacritic, the film has a score of 86 out of 100, based on 32 critics, indicating "universal acclaim".

=== Accolades ===
The Straight Story was nominated for the Palme d'Or at the 1999 Cannes Film Festival. Richard Farnsworth earned an Academy Award nomination for Best Actor for his portrayal of Alvin Straight. For 21 years he held the record as the oldest person (at 79) to be nominated for a Best Actor Oscar. Farnsworth also won the 1999 New York Film Critics Circle Award for Best Actor for his performance in the film.

List of awards and nominations received by The Straight Story
Award	Category	Nominee(s)	Result	Ref.
Academy Awards	Best Actor	Richard Farnsworth	Nominated	
Bodil Awards	Best American Film	David Lynch	Won	
British Independent Film Awards	Best International Independent Film – English Language		Won	
Cahiers du Cinéma	Annual Top 10 Lists		8th place	
Camerimage	Golden Frog	Freddie Francis	Nominated	
1999 Cannes Film Festival	Palme d'Or	David Lynch	Nominated	
Chicago Film Critics Association Awards	Best Picture		Nominated	
Chicago Film Critics Association Awards	Best Actor	Richard Farnsworth	Nominated	
Chicago Film Critics Association Awards	Best Director	David Lynch	Nominated	
European Film Awards	Screen International Award	David Lynch	Won	
Fort Lauderdale International Film Festival	Jury Award for Best Actor	Richard Farnsworth	Won	
Golden Globe Awards	Best Actor – Motion Picture Drama	Richard Farnsworth	Nominated	
Golden Globe Awards	Best Original Score – Motion Picture	Angelo Badalamenti	Nominated	
Guldbagge Awards	Best Foreign Film		Nominated	
Humanitas Prize	Feature Film Category	John Roach, Mary Sweeney	Nominated	
Independent Spirit Awards	Best Male Lead	Richard Farnsworth	Won	
Independent Spirit Awards	Best Feature	John Roach, Mary Sweeney	Nominated	
Independent Spirit Awards	Best Director	David Lynch	Nominated	
Independent Spirit Awards	Best First Screenplay	John Roach, Mary Sweeney	Nominated	
Los Angeles Film Critics Association Awards	Best Actor	Richard Farnsworth	2nd place	
National Board of Review Awards 1999	Top Ten Films		Won	
National Society of Film Critics Awards	Best Cinematography	Freddie Francis	Nominated	
New York Film Critics Circle Awards	Best Actor	Richard Farnsworth	Won	
New York Film Critics Circle Awards	Best Cinematographer	Freddie Francis	Won	
New York Film Critics Circle Awards	Best Director	David Lynch	Nominated	
New York Film Critics Circle Awards	Best Film		Nominated (Note: Tied with American Beauty and Being John Malkovich)	
Online Film & Television Association	Best Writing, Screenplay Written Directly for the Screen	John Roach, Mary Sweeney	Nominated	
Online Film & Television Association	Best First Screenplay	John Roach, Mary Sweeney	Nominated	
Online Film Critics Society Awards	Top Ten Films of the Year		7th place	
Online Film Critics Society Awards	Best Actor	Richard Farnsworth	Nominated	
Online Film Critics Society Awards	Best Original Score	Angelo Badalamenti	Nominated	
Online Film Critics Society Awards	Best Cinematography	Freddie Francis	Nominated	
Satellite Awards	Best Performance by an Actor in a Motion Picture, Drama	Richard Farnsworth	Nominated	
Satellite Awards	Best Performance by an Actress in a Supporting Role, Drama	Sissy Spacek	Nominated	
Village Voice Film Poll	Best Film		7th place	
