= Laurens, Iowa =

- City
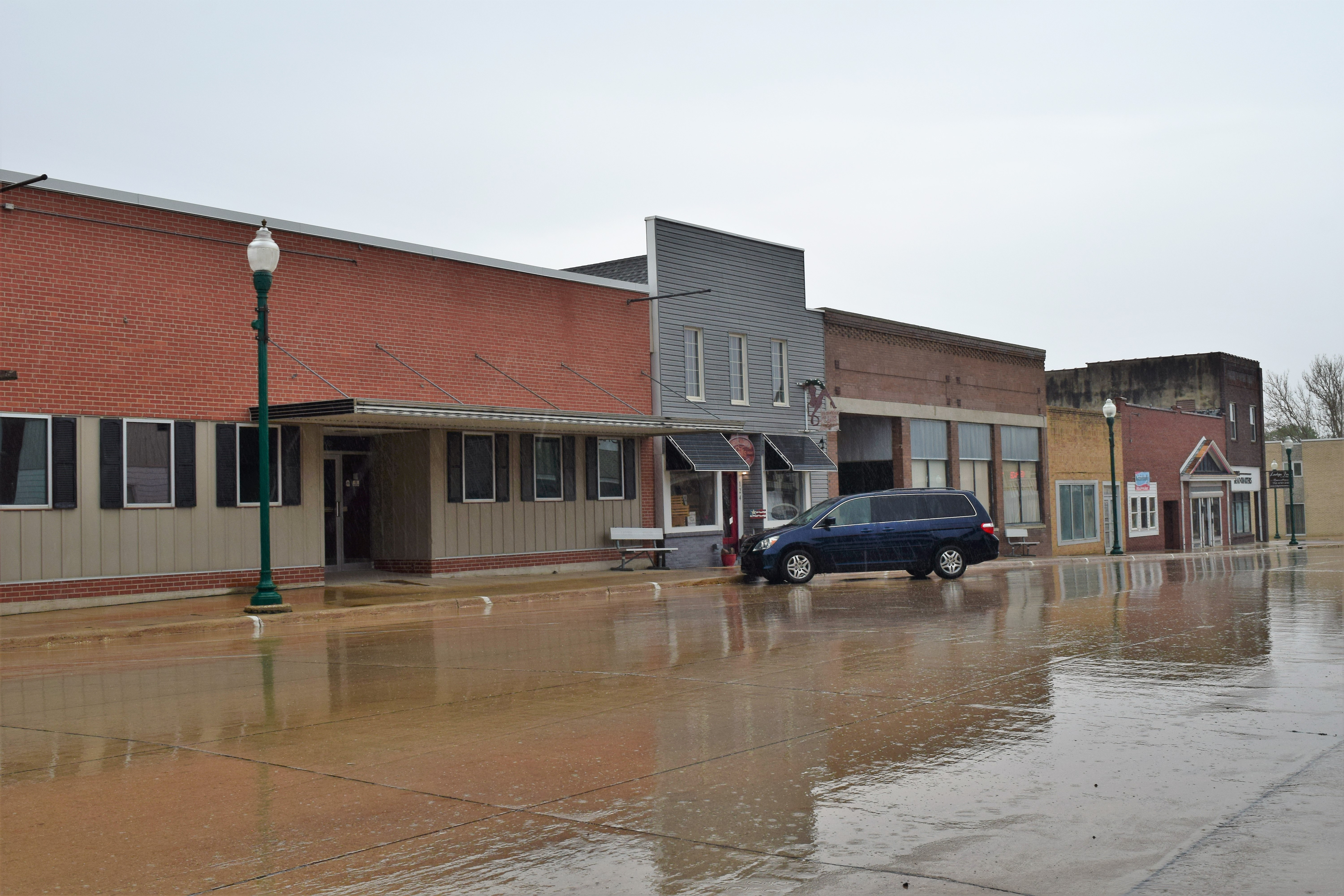
- Downtown Laurens

- Location of Laurens, Iowa
- Coordinates: 42°50′50″N 94°50′58″W
- Country: United States
- State: Iowa
- County: Pocahontas
- Incorporated: April 30, 1890

Area
  - Total: 0.76 sq mi (1.96 km^{2})
  - Land: 0.76 sq mi (1.96 km^{2})
  - Water: 0 sq mi (0.00 km^{2})
- Elevation: 1,309 ft (399 m)

Population (2020)
  - Total: 1,264
  - Density: 1,670.0/sq mi (644.79/km^{2})
- Time zone: UTC-6 (Central (CST))
  - Summer (DST): UTC-5 (CDT)
- ZIP code: 50554
- Area code: 712
- FIPS code: 19-43725
- GNIS feature ID: 0458243

Laurens is a city in Pocahontas County, Iowa, United States. Its population was 1,264 at the 2020 census.

== History ==
Laurens was platted in 1881. It was named in honor of Henry and John Laurens, father and son, two French Huguenots who became residents of Charleston, South Carolina, and were loyal to the Colonies during the Revolution.

== Geography ==
Laurens is located at 42°50′50″N 94°50′58″W (42.847105, -94.849542).

According to the United States Census Bureau, the city has a total area of 0.73 square miles (1.89 km^{2}), all land.

== Demographics ==
Historical populations
Year	Pop.	±%
1890	318	—
1900	853	+168.2%
1910	817	−4.2%
1920	914	+11.9%
1930	1,071	+17.2%
1940	1,304	+21.8%
1950	1,556	+19.3%
1960	1,799	+15.6%
1970	1,792	−0.4%
1980	1,606	−10.4%
1990	1,550	−3.5%
2000	1,476	−4.8%
2010	1,258	−14.8%
2020	1,264	+0.5%
Source:"U.S. Census website". United States Census Bureau. and Iowa Data Center; Source: U.S. Decennial Census

=== 2020 census ===
As of the 2020 census, there were 1,264 people, 577 households, and 346 families residing in the city. The population density was 1,670.0 inhabitants per square mile (644.8/km^{2}). There were 691 housing units at an average density of 913.0 per square mile (352.5/km^{2}), of which 16.5% were vacant. The homeowner vacancy rate was 2.6% and the rental vacancy rate was 21.8%.

0.0% of residents lived in urban areas, while 100.0% lived in rural areas.

Of the 577 households, 25.8% had children under the age of 18 living with them; 43.8% were married-couple households; 9.9% were cohabitating couples; 23.1% had a female householder with no spouse or partner present; and 23.2% had a male householder with no spouse or partner present. 40.0% of all households were non-families. 32.9% of all households were made up of individuals, and 14.2% had someone living alone who was 65 years old or older.

The median age in the city was 43.8 years. 22.8% of residents were under the age of 18, and 22.3% were 65 years of age or older. 24.4% of residents were under the age of 20; 3.6% were between the ages of 20 and 24; 24.1% were from 25 to 44; and 25.6% were from 45 to 64. For every 100 females there were 101.0 males, and for every 100 females age 18 and over there were 101.7 males age 18 and over.

Racial composition as of the 2020 census
Race	Number	Percent
White	1,100	87.0%
Black or African American	23	1.8%
American Indian and Alaska Native	5	0.4%
Asian	11	0.9%
Native Hawaiian and Other Pacific Islander	0	0.0%
Some other race	34	2.7%
Two or more races	91	7.2%
Hispanic or Latino (of any race)	92	7.3%

=== 2010 census ===
At the 2010 census there were 1,258 people in 571 households, including 332 families, in the city. The population density was 1,723.3 inhabitants per square mile (665.4/km^{2}). There were 677 housing units at an average density of 927.4 per square mile (358.1/km^{2}). The racial makup of the city was 97.5% White, 0.3% African American, 0.4% Native American, 0.3% Asian, 0.2% Pacific Islander, 0.6% from other races, and 0.6% from two or more races. Hispanic or Latino of any race were 1.4%.

Of the 571 households 25.7% had children under the age of 18 living with them, 45.5% were married couples living together, 8.2% had a female householder with no husband present, 4.4% had a male householder with no wife present, and 41.9% were non-families. 36.8% of households were one person and 16.4% were one person aged 65 or older. The average household size was 2.15 and the average family size was 2.80.

The median age was 45.6 years. 22% of residents were under the age of 18; 6.7% were between the ages of 18 and 24; 20.6% were from 25 to 44; 29.5% were from 45 to 64; and 21.2% were 65 or older. The gender makeup of the city was 49.3% male and 50.7% female.

=== 2000 census ===
At the 2000 census there were 1,476 people in 656 households, including 400 families, in the city. The population density was 1,999.4 inhabitants per square mile (772.0/km^{2}). There were 711 housing units at an average density of 963.1 per square mile (371.9/km^{2}). The racial makup of the city was 98.68% White, 0.14% Native American, 0.41% Asian, and 0.75% from two or more races. 1.08% of the population were Hispanic [0.01% Brazilian] [0.02 French] or Latino of any race. Of the 656 households 29.3% had children under the age of 18 living with them, 50.0% were married couples living together, 8.4% had a female householder with no husband present, and 39.0% were non-families. 36.9% of households were one person and 22.0% were one person aged 65 or older. The average household size was 2.18 and the average family size was 2.84.

24.0% are under the age of 18, 5.4% from 18 to 24, 25.2% from 25 to 44, 19.9% from 45 to 64, and 25.5% 65 or older. The median age was 42 years. For every 100 females, there were 88.7 males. For every 100 females age 18 and over, there were 81.3 males.

The median household income was $33,188 and the median family income was $43,661. Males had a median income of $31,063 versus $19,716 for females. The per capita income for the city was $16,711. About 4.8% of families and 7.4% of the population were below the poverty line, including 7.0% of those under age 18 and 8.6% of those age 65 or over.

== Education ==
Laurens is home to the Laurens–Marathon Community School District. It was a part of the Laurens Community School District until its consolidation into Laurens–Marathon on July 1, 1976. All grades are located in one building in Laurens. In 2000 the enrollment was 423 for all grades, and there were about 40 full-time teaching staff. High school students from Laurens–Marathon have attended Pocahontas Area High School since 2017.

== In popular culture ==
Laurens was the home of Alvin Straight, a 73-year-old man famous for travelling 240 miles (390 km) on a lawnmower. His story was made into the film The Straight Story (1999), directed by David Lynch and starring Richard Farnsworth (who received an Oscar-nomination for his performance) and Sissy Spacek. It was filmed partly in Laurens. "Laurens, Iowa" is also the title of an instrumental song in its soundtrack.

== Sister city ==
Laurens, France, became a sister city to Laurens, Iowa, during the preparations for the 2007 quasquicentennial (125th anniversary).

== Notable people ==
- Jesse Schmidt, record breaking wide receiver for the Iowa Barnstormers of the Arena Football League
- Alvin Straight, a 73-year-old man famous for travelling 240 miles on a lawnmower; his story was made into the film The Straight Story
- Becky Stoner, Miss Iowa USA 1969
- Fred C. Gilchrist, member of the Iowa House of Representatives for one term, in 1902–1904. He also served as president of the board of education of Laurens from 1905 to 1928. Returning to legislative service, he served the Iowa Senate from 1923 to 1931. He served seven terms as a Republican U.S. Representative from Iowa from 1933 to 1944.
- Adrian Lynch, a pitcher for the St. Louis Browns of the American Baseball League. He broke into the big leagues on August 4, 1920, but played in only five games. His record was 2–0 with a 5.24 ERA.
