= Sweet and Lowdown =

- Theatrical release poster
- Directed by: Woody Allen
- Written by: Woody Allen
- Produced by: Jean Doumanian
- Starring: Anthony LaPaglia; Brian Markinson; Gretchen Mol; Samantha Morton; Sean Penn; Uma Thurman; James Urbaniak; John Waters
- Cinematography: Zhao Fei
- Edited by: Alisa Lepselter
- Production company: Sweetland Films
- Distributed by: Sony Pictures Classics
- Release date: September 3, 1999
- Running time: 95 minutes
- Country: United States
- Language: English
- Budget: $29.7 million
- Box office: $4.2 million

Sweet and Lowdown is a 1999 American comedy-drama mockumentary written and directed by Woody Allen. Loosely based on Federico Fellini's film La Strada, the film tells the story of jazz guitarist Emmet Ray (played by Sean Penn) who falls in love with mute laundress Hattie (Samantha Morton). Like several of Allen's other films (e.g., Zelig), the film is occasionally interrupted by interviews with critics and biographers like Allen, Nat Hentoff, Daniel Okrent, and Douglas McGrath, who comment on the film's plot as if the characters were real-life people.

The film received generally positive reviews upon release, with Penn and Morton receiving Oscar nominations for Best Actor and Best Supporting Actress, respectively.

== Plot ==
Emmet Ray is a jazz guitarist who achieved some acclaim in the 1930s with a handful of recordings for RCA Victor, but faded from public view under mysterious circumstances. Although he is a talented musician, Ray's personal life fell into shambles after his disappearance from public view. He's often late in or even absent from performances with his quintet due to heavy drinking. He spends extravagantly, and is a womanizer and a pimp. When he's not playing music or pursuing women, he shoots rats at garbage dumps and watches passing trains.

Ray idolizes famed guitarist Django Reinhardt, so much that he's said to have fled a nightclub performance with severe stage fright upon hearing a false rumor that Reinhardt was in the audience. On a second occasion while eating in a restaurant in Germany, he passed out when Django unexpectedly entered the same restaurant for a meal while Ray was there.

While out with drummer Bill Shields, Ray meets Hattie, a shy, mute laundress, after they strike up a conversation with her and her friend. After overcoming initial frustration due to communication difficulties, Ray and Hattie form an affectionate and close relationship. However, Ray is convinced that a musician of his stature should never settle down with one woman. Despite this belief, Ray marries socialite Blanche Williams. But Williams sees Ray as a colorful example of lower-class life and a source of inspiration for her literary writing. Ray is tormented by nightmares and shouts out Hattie's name in his sleep.

When Williams cheats on Ray with mobster Al Torrio, Ray leaves her and finds Hattie. He assumes that she will take him back, but discovers that she is happily married and raising a family. Ray is despondent, and laments that leaving Hattie was a mistake. Allen and the rest of the documentary experts remark that Ray's final compositions were legendary, finally reaching the quality of Reinhardt's.

== Cast ==
- Anthony LaPaglia as Al Torrio
- Brian Markinson as Bill Shields
- Gretchen Mol as Ellie
- Samantha Morton as Hattie
- Sean Penn as Emmet Ray
- Uma Thurman as Blanche Williams
- James Urbaniak as Henry
- John Waters as Mr. Haynes
- Tony Darrow as Ben
- Brad Garrett as Joe Bedloe
- Vincent Guastaferro as Sid Bishop
- Denis O'Hare as Jake
- Molly Price as Ann
- Kaili Vernoff as Gracie
- Woody Allen as Himself
- Ben Duncan as Himself
- Daniel Okrent as A.J. Pickman
- Nat Hentoff as Himself
- Douglas McGrath as Himself
- Michael Sprague as Django Reinhardt

== Production ==
=== Development ===
After his 1969 directing debut Take the Money and Run, Allen signed a contract to direct a series of films with United Artists. Told to "write what you want to write," Allen, a clarinetist and avid jazz enthusiast, wrote The Jazz Baby, a drama screenplay about a jazz musician set in the 1930s. Allen said later that the United Artists executives were "stunned ... because they had expected a comedy. [They] were very worried and told me, 'We realize that we signed a contract with you and you can do anything you want. But we want to tell you that we really don't like this.'" Allen went along with United Artists, writing and directing Bananas instead. In 1995, he dismissed The Jazz Baby as having been "probably too ambitious."

In 1998, Allen returned to the project, rewriting the script and changing its name to Sweet and Lowdown. Allen had originally planned to play Ray himself, but eventually cast Sean Penn. Allen also considered Johnny Depp, but Depp was busy at the time. Penn had a reputation for being difficult to work with, but Allen later said, "I had no problem with him whatsoever ... He gave it his all and took direction and made contributions himself ... a tremendous actor."

Allen, in a retrospective, said that he told Samantha Morton to "play [her] part like Harpo Marx. And she said, 'Who is Harpo Marx?' and I realized how young she was. Then I told her about him [and] she went back and saw the films."

=== Filming ===
Sweet and Lowdown was filmed entirely in New York and New Jersey but is set in the Chicago area and California.

The film was the first of Allen's that was edited by Alisa Lepselter, who has edited all of Allen's films since. Lepselter succeeded Susan E. Morse, who edited Allen's films for the previous twenty years.

It was also the first of three films where Allen collaborated with Chinese cinematographer Zhao Fei. Allen had first noticed Zhao with his award-winning work on Raise the Red Lantern, some years earlier.

== Music ==
The music for the film was arranged and conducted by Dick Hyman. All of the guitar solos were played by guitarist Howard Alden.

Additional rhythm guitarists were Bucky Pizzarelli and James Chirillo. Chirillo played rhythm guitar on the track "Sweet Georgia Brown." Pizzarelli created all other rhythm tracks.

=== Soundtrack ===
- When Day Is Done (1926) - Written by Robert Katscher – Performed by Django Reinhardt
- Clarinet Marmalade (1918) – Written by Larry Shields and Henry Ragas – Performed by Ted Lewis and His Orchestra
- Parlez-moi d'Amour (1930) – Written by Jean Lenoir – Performed by Howard Alden
- Mystery Pacific (1936–7) – Written by Django Reinhardt and Stéphane Grappelli – Performed by Howard Alden, Bucky Pizzarelli and [Kelly Friesen
- Limehouse Blues (1922) – Lyrics by Philip Braham – Written by Douglas Furber – Arranged by Dick Hyman
- It Don't Mean a Thing (1931) – Lyrics by Irving Mills – Written by Duke Ellington
- Out of Nowhere (1931) – Lyrics by Edward Heyman – Written by Johnny Green
- I'll See You in My Dreams (1924) – Lyrics by Gus Kahn – Written by Isham Jones
- Sweet Georgia Brown (1925) – Music by Ben Bernie and Maceo Pinkard – Lyrics by Kenneth Casey
- Unfaithful Woman (1999) – Written by Dick Hyman
- Shine (1910) – Lyrics by Cecil Mack, Lew Brown – Music by Ford Dabney
- After You've Gone (1918) – Lyrics by Henry Creamer – Written by Turner Layton
- I'm Forever Blowing Bubbles (1919) – Lyrics by James Brockman, Nat Vincent, James Kendis – Music by John W. Kellette
- There'll Be Some Changes Made (1921) – Lyrics by Billy Higgins – Music by W. Benton Overstreet
- Viper Mad (1937) – Written by Clarence Williams (musician) and Sidney Bechet – Performed by Sidney Bechet
- Indiana (1917) – Written by Ballard MacDonald and James F. Hanley – Performed by Red Nichols
- Aloha Oe (1908) – Written by Queen Liliuokalani – Performed by Dick Monday
- Abide with Me (1847) – Lyrics by Henry F. Lyte – Music by William H. Monk
- 12th Street Rag (1919) – Written by Euday L. Bowman – Performed by Howard Alden
- The Peanut Vendor (1927) – Written by Moïse Simons – English Lyrics by L. Wolfe Gilbert and Marion Sunshine
- All of Me (1931) – Written by Gerald Marks and Seymour Simons
- Caravan (1936) – Written by Duke Ellington, Juan Tizol and Irving Mills – Performed by Bunny Berigan and His Orchestra
- Old Fashioned Love (1923) – Music by James P. Johnson – Lyrics by Cecil Mack
- Just a Gigolo (1929) – Written by Irving Caesar – Written by Leonello Casucci and Julius Brammer
- Nevertheless (I'm in Love with You) (1931) – Lyrics by Bert Kalmar – Music by Harry Ruby
- 3:00 AM Blues (1999) – Written by Dick Hyman
- Liebestraum No. 3 (1850) – Written by Franz Liszt – Performed by Django Reinhardt
- Since My Best Gal Turned Me Down (1927) – Written by Ray Ludwig and Howdy Quicksell – Performed by Bix Beiderbecke
- Wrap Your Troubles in Dreams (1931) – Lyrics by Ted Koehler, Billy Moll – Music by Harry Barris
- Hot Lips (1922) – Written by Henry Busse, Henry Lange and Lou Davis – Performed by Henry Busse and His Orchestra
- You Were Meant for Me (1929) – Lyrics by Arthur Freed – Music by Nacio Herb Brown
- Avalon (1920) – Written by Buddy G. DeSylva, Al Jolson and Vincent Rose – Performed by Django Reinhardt
- Lulu's Back in Town (1935) – Music by Harry Warren – Lyrics by Al Dubin
- Sweet Sue, Just You (1928) – Lyrics by Will J. Harris – Music by Victor Young – Performed by Howard Alden

== Reception ==
The film received generally positive reviews. On Rotten Tomatoes it has a 77% rating based on reviews from 61 critics. The site's consensus is: "Critics praise Woody Allen's Sweet and Lowdown for its charming, light-hearted comedy and quality acting." On Metacritic the film has a score of 70% based on reviews from 30 critics, indicating "generally favorable reviews".

Morton's performance was met with critical acclaim, with Salon.com critic Stephanie Zacharek saying that she "quietly explodes [the film] ... Her performance is like nothing I've seen in recent years.""

Roger Ebert of The Chicago Sun-Times gave Sweet and Lowdown a glowing review. Penn's performance was so believable that Emmet Ray "seems like a real chapter of jazz history we somehow overlooked", playing the character with an appealing "sweetness and innocence" that balanced Ray's less flattering qualities like vanity and kleptomania. "You will want to own the soundtrack," Ebert wrote of the music, also noting Penn's pantomime guitar playing never seemed artificial. Ebert described Morton as a talented actress who was "not used as an actress so much as a presence, as in the silent days", and wrote that Emmet was "too unhinged to understand what a treasure she is."

== Accolades ==
Sweet and Lowdown was nominated for the Academy Awards for Best Actor in a Leading Role (Penn) and Best Actress in a Supporting Role (Morton). The pair were also nominated for Golden Globe Awards in the acting categories for Motion Picture - Comedy or Musical. The film received three nominations from the Chlotrudis Society for Independent Films for Best Actor, Best Supporting Actress, and Best Screenplay.

In addition, Morton was nominated for Best Supporting Actress in the Chicago Film Critics Association Awards, the Los Angeles Film Critics Association Awards, the National Society of Film Critics Awards, and for an Empire Award for Best British Actress. At the London Film Critics Circle Awards, Morton won British Supporting Actress of the Year.

== Theatrical Release versus Video and Television Version ==
In the original theatrical release there was a subplot in which Emmet Ray buys a new car and a gift for Hattie, but later abandons her as she sleeps, leaving her some cash by the side of the bed. In the current version, after he buys the new car and shows it to her and gives her the gift box, the first mention of him leaving her after that is in a dinner conversation between Emmet and Blanche where he says he just cut out one night at four in the morning when she was asleep and left $500 cash by the bed, and he did the right thing for him. There is also a scene after Ray performs in an amateur talent competition and wins first prize, where the crowd starts to realize that Ray is a professional and menacingly moves to gather around him, whereupon he flees with his companion, running through the woods. One current version just shows him leaving soon after the competition and then, settled in the woods in front of a campfire, talking about the close call. Another variation cuts to the campfire right after he finishes playing his guitar, from a close-up on his face, not even showing him winning the contest.
