= 1999 National Society of Film Critics Awards =

Annual US film awards ceremony

34th NSFC Awards

January 8, 2000

Best Film (tie):
Being John Malkovich
and
Topsy-Turvy

The 34th National Society of Film Critics Awards, given on 8 January 2000, honored the best filmmaking of 1999.

== Winners ==
=== Best Picture ===
1. Being John Malkovich
1. Topsy-Turvy
3. Election

=== Best Director ===
1. Mike Leigh – Topsy-Turvy
2. David O. Russell – Three Kings
3. Sam Mendes – American Beauty

=== Best Actor ===
1. Russell Crowe – The Insider
2. Jim Broadbent – Topsy-Turvy
3. Kevin Spacey – American Beauty

=== Best Actress ===
1. Reese Witherspoon – Election
2. Hilary Swank – Boys Don't Cry
3. Kate Winslet – Holy Smoke

=== Best Supporting Actor ===
1. Christopher Plummer – The Insider
2. Philip Seymour Hoffman – Magnolia and The Talented Mr. Ripley
3. Haley Joel Osment – The Sixth Sense

=== Best Supporting Actress ===
1. Chloë Sevigny – Boys Don't Cry
2. Julianne Moore – Magnolia, Cookie's Fortune, A Map of the World and An Ideal Husband
3. Samantha Morton – Sweet and Lowdown

=== Best Screenplay ===
1. Charlie Kaufman – Being John Malkovich
2. Alexander Payne and Jim Taylor – Election
3. Alan Ball – American Beauty

=== Best Cinematography ===
1. Conrad L. Hall – American Beauty
2. Emmanuel Lubezki – Sleepy Hollow
3. Freddie Francis – The Straight Story

=== Best Foreign Language Film ===
1. Autumn Tale (Conte d'automne)
2. The Dreamlife of Angels (La vie rêvée des anges)
3. All About My Mother (Todo sobre mi madre)

=== Best Non-Fiction Film ===
1. Buena Vista Social Club
2. Mr. Death: The Rise and Fall of Fred A. Leuchter, Jr.
3. American Movie

=== Experimental Film Award ===
- Robert Beavers

=== Special Citation ===
- James Quandt of Cinematheque Ontario

=== Film Heritage Awards ===
1. The U.S. theatrical release of the rediscovered camera-negative print of Jean Renoir’s Grand Illusion by Rialto Pictures.
2. The newly preserved fiftieth-anniversary re-release of Carol Reed’s The Third Man by Rialto Pictures.
3. The U.S. video and DVD release of Gaumont’s original version of Carl Dreyer’s The Passion of Joan of Arc by Home Vision and Criterion.
4. The television premiere of the four-hour expanded version of Erich von Stroheim’s Greed on Turner Classic Movies.
