= Jeffrey Wigand =

American whistleblower, tobacco company executive (born 1942)

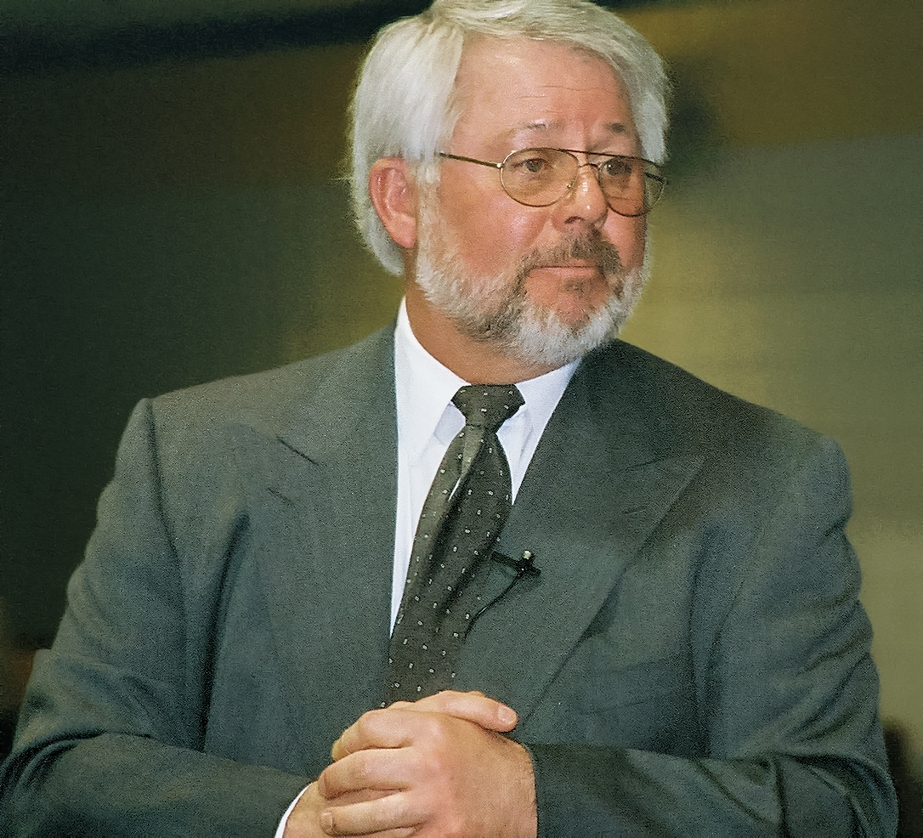
- Wigand in 2006
- Born: Jeffrey Stephen Wigand; December 17, 1942 (age 83); New York City, New York, U.S.
- Education: MA/PhD
- Alma mater: University at Buffalo
- Occupations: Expert witness, consultant
- Known for: Whistleblower on the tobacco industry
- Spouse: Hope Elizabeth May
- Website: JeffreyWigand.com

Jeffrey Stephen Wigand (/ˈwaɪɡænd/; born December 17, 1942) is an American biochemist and tobacco industry whistleblower.

He is a former vice president of research and development at Brown & Williamson in Louisville, Kentucky, who worked on the development of reduced-harm cigarettes and in 1996 exposed tobacco tampering at the company. This was adapted for 1999 film The Insider, with Russell Crowe portraying Wigand.

He currently lectures around the world and serves as a consultant for various tobacco issues.

== Early life, military service and education ==
Wigand was born in New York City and grew up in the Bronx and later Pleasant Valley, New York. After a brief time in the military (including a short assignment in Vietnam), he earned a Master's and a PhD from the University at Buffalo in Biochemistry.

== Career ==
Prior to working for Brown & Williamson, Wigand worked for several health care companies, including Pfizer and Johnson & Johnson. In addition, he was employed as General Manager and marketing director at Union Carbide in Japan, and as a senior vice president at Technicon Instruments.

== Tobacco industry whistleblowing ==
In late 1995, Mississippi subpoenaed Wigand to testify in the state's lawsuit against thirteen major tobacco companies ('Big Tobacco'). The state contended the companies' products led to the tobacco-related deaths of Mississippi residents. The state sued because it had to spend state funds to treat their illnesses.

Wigand later became famous as a whistleblower when he appeared on the CBS news program 60 Minutes on February 4, 1996. He stated that Brown & Williamson had intentionally manipulated its tobacco blend with chemicals such as ammonia to increase the effect of nicotine in cigarette smoke. According to Wigand, he was subsequently harassed and received anonymous death threats.

Wigand had begun to work for Brown & Williamson in January 1989. He was fired on March 24, 1993. He says that he was fired as a whistleblower because he knew that high-ranking corporate executives knowingly approved the addition of additives to their cigarettes that were known to be carcinogenic and/or addictive, such as coumarin.

Brown & Williamson undertook a concerted effort to discredit Wigand, which included hiring Terry Lenzner's company Investigative Group International to produce a 500-page dossier on Wigand, which was distributed to the media. The dossier backfired, as news outlets examined the claims in it, finding many claims of misconduct to be unsubstantiated or trivial.

== Post-whistleblowing career ==
Wigand later taught physical science, biology and Japanese at DuPont Manual Magnet High School in Louisville, Kentucky, where he was named the 1996 Teacher of the Year for the state of Kentucky.

Wigand no longer teaches high school and instead lectures worldwide to a variety of audiences including children, college, medical and law students, and a diverse group of policy makers. He has consulted with governments throughout the world on tobacco control policies.

== Media depictions ==
He was portrayed by Russell Crowe in the 1999 film The Insider directed by Michael Mann. Crowe was nominated for the Academy Award for Best Actor for his portrayal of Wigand.

== Personal life ==
He met his first wife, Linda, in 1970 while attending a judo class.

Wigand is now married to Hope Elizabeth May, an American philosopher, author, and lawyer who is a professor at Central Michigan University in Mount Pleasant, Michigan, where they both now reside. They met when May requested he speak for a university event.
