= Election (1999 film) =

1999 film by Alexander Payne

- Theatrical release poster
- Directed by: Alexander Payne
- Screenplay by: Alexander Payne; Jim Taylor
- Based on: Election by Tom Perrotta
- Produced by: Albert Berger; Ron Yerxa; David Gale; Keith Samples
- Starring: Matthew Broderick; Reese Witherspoon
- Cinematography: James Glennon
- Edited by: Kevin Tent
- Music by: Rolfe Kent
- Production companies: MTV Productions; Bona Fide Productions
- Distributed by: Paramount Pictures
- Release date: April 23, 1999
- Running time: 103 minutes
- Country: United States
- Language: English
- Budget: $8.5–25 million
- Box office: $17.2 million

Election is a 1999 American satirical black comedy film directed by Alexander Payne from a screenplay by Payne and Jim Taylor, based on Tom Perrotta's 1998 novel.

The plot revolves around a student body election and satirizes politics and high school life. The film stars Matthew Broderick as Jim McAllister, a popular high school social studies teacher, and Reese Witherspoon as Tracy Flick, a high-achieving student whom he dislikes. When Tracy runs for student government president, McAllister attempts to sabotage her candidacy by encouraging a rival candidate.

Election was released by Paramount Pictures on April 23, 1999. Although not a commercial success as it grossed $17.2 million against an $8.5–25 million budget, Election received positive reviews, along with an Academy Award nomination for Best Adapted Screenplay, a Golden Globe nomination for Witherspoon for Best Actress – Motion Picture Comedy or Musical, and three Independent Spirit Awards including Best Feature Film in 1999.

== Plot ==
Jim McAllister is a well-liked U.S. history and civics teacher at Carver High School in Omaha, Nebraska. One of his students is Tracy Flick, an academically driven and high-achieving junior whose single mother encourages her to strive for success. Earlier in the year, Jim's colleague and best friend, geometry teacher Dave Novotny, was fired and divorced by his wife, Linda, after engaging in a sexual relationship with Tracy. Though Jim believes Dave deserved to face consequences for his actions, he resents the lack of repercussions for Tracy.

Jim struggles to conceive a child with his wife, Diane, and begins to have sexual fantasies about Linda (sometimes disturbingly interrupted by Tracy). Appalled by Tracy's unopposed run for student government president and dreading further proximity to her, Jim persuades Paul Metzler, a popular, good-natured but dimwitted football player, to enter the race. Sidelined from football with a broken leg sustained in a skiing accident, Paul finds that his candidacy gives him purpose. It also infuriates Tracy, who had expected to run unchallenged.

Tammy Metzler, Paul's adopted younger sister, has been trying to secure a relationship with Lisa Flanagan, who breaks up with her and begins dating Paul and managing his campaign. Heartbroken, Tammy retaliates by running as a spoiler candidate. In her speech at a school assembly, she denounces student government as a sham and vows to dissolve it if she wins, rallying the students to a standing ovation. The principal, Walt Hendricks, suspends her for three days.

Late one Sunday night, while working on the school yearbook, Tracy sees that one of her campaign posters has started to detach from the wall. While attempting to fix it, she accidentally tears the poster, then furiously destroys the other candidates' campaign posters and discards them in a dumpster, which Tammy witnesses. The next day, Jim confronts Tracy about the posters. She feigns innocence and trades threats with Jim, but Tammy rescues her by appearing with the torn posters and claiming responsibility. The school expels Tammy, and her name is removed from the ballot.

Jim has a tryst with Linda the day before the election. She asks him to rent a motel room for an afternoon rendezvous, but does not show. Jim looks for Linda at her house, where a bee stings his eyelid. He returns home find Linda and Diane, who are both upset with him. He sleeps in his car.

Paul thinks it is wrong to vote for himself and casts his ballot for Tracy. A student ballot count indicates Tracy win by a single vote. Jim independently confirms the count but discards two of Tracy's ballots, throwing the election to Paul. The discarded ballots are later discovered by a janitor who dislikes Jim, and Tracy becomes class president. Jim resigns and Diane divorces him, taking the house and leaving him the car.

Jim leaves Nebraska and fulfills his dream of moving to New York City. He becomes a tour guide at the American Museum of Natural History and begins dating a co-worker. Lisa breaks up with Paul, but he goes on to develop an active social life at the University of Nebraska–Lincoln. Tammy finds a new girlfriend at her all-girls Catholic school. Tracy attends Georgetown, where she again isolates herself from her peers due to her single-minded focus. On a sightseeing trip to Washington, D.C., Jim spots Tracy with a Nebraska congressman and hurls a cup of soda at their departing limousine. Later, while giving a museum tour to a group of elementary-school children, a girl enthusiastically raises her hand to answer a question, reminding Jim of Tracy.

== Cast ==
- Matthew Broderick as Jim McAllister
- Reese Witherspoon as Tracy Enid Flick
- Chris Klein as Paul Metzler
- Jessica Campbell as Tammy Metzler
- Mark Harelik as Dave Novotny
- Phil Reeves as Principal Walt Hendricks
- Molly Hagan as Diane McAllister
- Delaney Driscoll as Linda Novotny
- Colleen Camp as Judith Flick
- Frankie Ingrassia as Lisa Flanagan
- Matt Malloy as Vice Principal Ron Ball
- Jeanine Jackson as Jo Metzler
- Holmes Osborne as Richard "Dick" Metzler
- Nicholas D'Agosto as Larry Fouch
- Pegi Georgeson as Ballot Lady

== Production ==
Producers Albert Berger and Ron Yerxa sent director Alexander Payne an unpublished manuscript from novelist Tom Perrotta called "Election" in 1996. Payne was initially uninterested in directing a high school movie but changed his mind after he read the manuscript. "It was set in a high school, but it wasn’t a high school story, per se. Also what attracted me was the formal exercise of doing a movie with multiple points of view and multiple voice-overs," said Payne. The novel's rights were sold to Payne in January 1997. It was officially published in March 1998.

The novel was inspired by the following two key events: the 1992 United States presidential election, in which Ross Perot entered as a third-party candidate (a move echoed by Tammy Metzler), and a 1992 incident at Memorial High School in Eau Claire, Wisconsin, in which a pregnant student was elected homecoming queen, but staff announced a different winner and burned the ballots to cover it up.

The film uses several stylized techniques in its storytelling, particularly through the use of freeze frames, flashbacks, and voiceovers, which allow sections of the narrative to be delivered from the points of view of the four main characters (Mr. McAllister, Tracy, Paul, and Tammy).

The film was primarily shot on location around the Omaha metro area in late 1997, most notably in Papillion, Bellevue and the Dundee neighborhood. Papillion-La Vista Senior High School portrayed the fictitious Carver High School with many of the background extras being actual enrolled students at the time. Minor scenes were filmed at Younkers in Westroads Mall, the Old Market, and the Henry Doorly Zoo and Aquarium. In Paramount's 1997 fiscal report, the film was planned for release in 1998, but was delayed for a year.

=== Alternate ending ===
The film's original ending, received poorly by test audiences, was not known until a rough workprint was found in a box of VHS tapes at a yard sale in 2011. This ending also appears in the third draft of the script, which can be read online. It is faithful to the book: McAllister stays in Omaha and is hired as a used car salesman by one of his former students instead of moving to New York City. Tracy encounters McAllister while looking to buy a car and the two settle their differences before she has him sign her yearbook.

== Release ==
Election was not a box office success as it grossed only $17.2 million against a budget of $8.5-25 million.

== Reception ==
On Rotten Tomatoes, the film holds a rating of 92%, based on 116 reviews, with an average rating of 7.90/10. The critical consensus reads, "Election successfully combines dark humor and intelligent writing in this very witty and enjoyable film." On Metacritic, the film has a score of 83 out of 100, based on 33 reviews, indicating "universal acclaim". Audiences surveyed by CinemaScore gave the film a grade "B−" on a scale of A to F. It later placed at #5 in the first annual Village Voice Film Poll.

Roger Ebert gave the film three and a half out of four stars, praising Witherspoon and Payne:

...here is a movie that is not simply about an obnoxious student, but also about an imperfect teacher, a lockstep administration, and a student body that is mostly just marking time until it can go out into the world and occupy valuable space.

Todd McCarthy of Variety wrote: "Brandishes the sort of intelligent wit and bracing nastiness that will make it more appealing to discerning adults than to teens who just want to have fun."

Desson Howe from The Washington Post recommended the film, saying it was "the satire of the season, a hilarious, razor-sharp indictment of the American Dream," also praising Payne for finding "a perfect fulcrum between humor and tragedy, between black comedy and poignancy."

According to Payne, it is also President Barack Obama's favorite political film.

=== Accolades ===
Election is ranked #61 on Bravo's "100 Funniest Movies", #389 on Empire's "500 Greatest Movies of All Time" and #9 on Entertainment Weekly's list of the "50 Best High School Movies", while Witherspoon's performance was ranked at #45 on the list of the "100 Greatest Film Performances of All Time" by Premiere.

Year	Award	Category	Nominee(s)	Result	Ref.
1999	Academy Awards	Best Adapted Screenplay	Alexander Payne, Jim Taylor	Nominated	
1999	Golden Globe Awards	Best Actress - Motion Picture Comedy or Musical	Reese Witherspoon	Nominated	
1999	Golden Satellite Awards	Best Actress – Motion Picture Comedy or Musical	Reese Witherspoon	Nominated	
1999	Independent Spirit Awards	Best Feature	Election	Won	
1999	Independent Spirit Awards	Best Direction	Alexander Payne	Won	
1999	Independent Spirit Awards	Best Screenplay	Alexander Payne, Jim Taylor	Won	
1999	Independent Spirit Awards	Best Female Lead	Reese Witherspoon	Nominated	
1999	Independent Spirit Awards	Best Debut Performance	Jessica Campbell	Nominated	
1999	Los Angeles Film Critics Association	Best Actress	Reese Witherspoon	Runner-up	
1999	Los Angeles Film Critics Association	Next Generation Award	Alexander Payne, Jim Taylor	Won	
1999	New York Film Critics Circle	Best Screenplay	Alexander Payne, Jim Taylor	Won	
1999	National Society of Film Critics	Best Film	Election	3rd place	
1999	National Society of Film Critics	Best Screenplay	Alexander Payne, Jim Taylor	2nd place	
1999	National Society of Film Critics	Best Actress	Reese Witherspoon	Won	
1999	National Board of Review	Excellence in filmmaking	Election	Won	
1999	Writers Guild of America Awards	Best Adapted Screenplay	Alexander Payne, Jim Taylor	Won	

== Home media ==
Election was released on DVD on October 19, 1999, and Blu-ray on January 20, 2009. A special edition Blu-ray was released by The Criterion Collection on December 16, 2017, with a 4K restoration of the film.

== Sequel ==
In December 2022, it was announced that a film adaptation of the novel's 2022 sequel, Tracy Flick Can't Win, was being developed for Paramount+. Witherspoon is slated to reprise her role as Tracy Flick and co-produce under her Hello Sunshine banner, while Payne would return to direct and co-write with Jim Taylor. A year later, while promoting The Holdovers (2023), Payne reiterated interest in the project, but would like to pursue other projects first. Payne said that he wants to make a loose adaptation of the novel with Taylor that included Broderick's Jim McAllister character, as well as divert from the high school setting of the novel, attributing to his averseness to "making another high school movie," saying:

I did Election. I did Holdovers. There are bits and pieces of it in Sideways, and a pilot I did, so I’m a little over it, so Jim and I are talking right now about how can we adapt that novel faithfully, but loosely, and put our own voice into it. We’ll get there. We’re not quite there, but we’ll get there.
