= Alvin Straight =

American man who became notable for traveling on a lawn mower

- Born: Alvin Boone Straight; October 17, 1920; Scobey, Montana, US
- Died: November 9, 1996 (aged 76); Pocahontas, Iowa, US
- Occupations: Soldier and general laborer
- Known for: Driving from Laurens, Iowa to Blue River, Wisconsin on a lawn mower

Alvin Boone Straight (October 17, 1920 – November 9, 1996) was an American man who travelled 240 miles (390 km) on a riding lawn mower from Laurens, Iowa, to Blue River, Wisconsin, to visit his sick brother in 1994. His journey inspired the 1999 film The Straight Story.

== Early life ==
Alvin Straight was born in Scobey, Montana. He married Frances Beek on October 17, 1946, in Scobey. In 1973, the family moved to Lake View, Iowa, where Alvin worked as a general laborer. He was the father of five sons and two daughters. Straight was a veteran of World War II and the Korean War, serving as private first class in the United States Army.

== Lawn mower trip ==
In June 1994, Straight's 80-year-old brother Henry Straight (Palisade, Iowa, January 4, 1914 – June 15, 1998) had suffered a stroke. At the age of 73 and in poor health from diabetes, emphysema and other ailments, Straight could not see well enough for a driver's license, so he decided his only option was to travel on his 1966 John Deere riding lawn mower.

Setting off in early July 1994, Straight drove the mower along highway shoulders, towing a trailer loaded with gasoline, camping gear, clothes, and food from his home in Laurens, Iowa, to his brother in Blue River, Wisconsin.

About four days and 21 miles into the trip, the lawn mower broke down in West Bend, Iowa. Straight spent $250 on replacement parts, including a condenser, plugs, a generator, and a starter.

After traveling another 90 miles, Straight ran out of money while in Charles City, Iowa. He camped there for a few days until his next Social Security checks arrived in August. He was interviewed by local newspapers. On August 15, Straight's lawn mower broke down again when he was two miles from his brother's house near Blue River. A farmer stopped and helped him push it the rest of the way. At a top speed of 5 miles per hour (8.0 km/h), the trip took six weeks in all. After the visit, his nephew, Dayne Straight, drove him back to Iowa in his pickup truck.

Henry Straight recovered from his stroke and moved back to Iowa to be closer to Alvin and the rest of his family.

Paul Condit, president and general manager of Texas Equipment Company, Inc., in Seminole, Texas, heard about the trip and gave Straight a 17-horsepower John Deere replacement riding mower worth $5,000. Straight disliked the media attention his lawn mower trip attracted and turned down offers to appear on various TV talk shows including The Tonight Show with Jay Leno and Late Show with David Letterman.

== Later years and death ==
In April 1995, Straight attempted to drive a riding lawn mower to Sun Valley, Idaho, but he had to turn back because of cold weather. On November 9, 1996, he died of a heart ailment at a local hospital in Pocahontas, Iowa, at age 76. A lawn mower similar to the one he had used on his journey accompanied his funeral procession to the Ida Grove Cemetery. He is buried in Ida Grove, Iowa.

== Adaptations ==
Playwright and performer Dan Hurlin and composer and sound designer Dan Moses Schreier adapted Straight's trip into a theatrical production, The Shoulder, that was billed as an opera. The Shoulder premiered at CSPS Hall in Cedar Rapids, Iowa in October 1997, presented by Legion Arts. It was also performed in January 1998 at New York's Dance Theater Workshop and Minneapolis' Walker Art Center.

Straight's story was adapted into the film The Straight Story, directed by David Lynch, which starred Richard Farnsworth (in an Academy Award-nominated role) as Alvin Straight. When plans for the film began in 1995, Straight signed a contract that ensured he would receive $10,000 plus 10% of the movie's profits, but he died before the film's completion. He said he did not make the trip to see his brother for the possibility of fame or money.
