= Chicago Film Critics Association Awards 1999 =

Annual US film awards ceremony

12th CFCA Awards

March 13, 2000

Best Film:
American Beauty

The 12th Chicago Film Critics Association Awards, given on 13 March 2000, honored the finest achievements in 1999 filmmaking.

== Winners ==
- Best Actor:
  - Kevin Spacey - American Beauty
- Best Actress:
  - Hilary Swank - Boys Don't Cry
- Best Cinematography:
  - Snow Falling on Cedars - Robert Richardson
- Best Director:
  - Sam Mendes - American Beauty
- Best Film:
  - American Beauty
- Best Foreign Language Film:
  - Todo sobre mi madre (All About My Mother), Spain
- Best Score:
  - "South Park: Bigger, Longer & Uncut"- Trey Parker and Marc Shaiman
- Best Screenplay:
  - Being John Malkovich - Charlie Kaufman
- Best Supporting Actor:
  - Tom Cruise - Magnolia
- Best Supporting Actress:
  - Chloë Sevigny - Boys Don't Cry
- Most Promising Actor:
  - Wes Bentley - American Beauty
- Most Promising Actress (tie):
  - Émilie Dequenne - Rosetta
  - Julia Stiles - 10 Things I Hate About You
- Commitment to Chicago Award
  - The Cusack Family: Dick, Nancy, Joan, Susan, Ann, John, and Bill
- Big Shoulders Awards
  - Facets Multi-Media, Inc.
