= The Insider (film) =

1999 drama film by Michael Mann

- Theatrical release poster
- Directed by: Michael Mann
- Written by: Eric Roth; Michael Mann
- Based on: "The Man Who Knew Too Much" by Marie Brenner
- Produced by: Michael Mann; Pieter Jan Brugge
- Starring: Al Pacino; Russell Crowe; Christopher Plummer; Diane Venora; Philip Baker Hall; Lindsay Crouse; Debi Mazar
- Cinematography: Dante Spinotti
- Edited by: William Goldenberg; Paul Rubell; David Rosenbloom
- Music by: Lisa Gerrard; Pieter Bourke
- Production companies: Touchstone Pictures; Spyglass Entertainment; Forward Pass
- Distributed by: Buena Vista Pictures Distribution
- Release date: November 5, 1999
- Running time: 157 minutes
- Country: United States
- Language: English
- Budget: $68–90 million
- Box office: $60.3 million

The Insider is a 1999 American biographical thriller film directed by Michael Mann and written by Mann and Eric Roth, based on Marie Brenner's 1996 Vanity Fair article "The Man Who Knew Too Much". The film stars Al Pacino, Russell Crowe, Christopher Plummer, Bruce McGill, Diane Venora and Michael Gambon.

A fictionalized account of a true story, it centers on the controversial 60 Minutes segment about Jeffrey Wigand, a whistleblower in the tobacco industry, covering his and CBS producer Lowell Bergman's struggles as they defend his testimony against efforts to discredit and suppress it by CBS and Wigand's former employer.

The Insider was released by Buena Vista Pictures Distribution on November 5, 1999. Although not a box-office success, The Insider received acclaim from critics, who praised Crowe's portrayal of Wigand and Mann's direction. It was nominated for seven Academy Awards, including Best Picture and Best Actor in a Leading Role (for Russell Crowe).

== Plot ==
CBS producer Lowell Bergman convinces the founder of Hezbollah, Sheikh Fadlallah, to grant an interview to Mike Wallace for 60 Minutes. Wallace and Bergman firmly stand their ground against the Sheikh's armed and hostile bodyguards, who attempt to intimidate and disrupt their interview preparations.

Later, Bergman approaches Jeffrey Wigand—a former executive at the Brown & Williamson tobacco company—for help explaining technical documents. Wigand agrees but intrigues Bergman when he insists that he will not discuss anything else, citing a confidentiality agreement.

Brown & Williamson coerces Wigand into a more restrictive agreement, leading Wigand to accuse Bergman of betraying him. Bergman subsequently visits Wigand to defend himself and investigate the potential story. Although Wigand apparently possesses very damaging information, he hesitates to reveal anything, fearing that it will jeopardize his severance package from Brown & Williamson. Wigand's family moves into a more modest house, and Wigand begins working as a teacher. One night, Wigand finds evidence of trespass and receives a sinister phone call.

Meanwhile, Bergman contacts Richard Scruggs, an attorney representing Mississippi in a lawsuit against the tobacco industry. Bergman suggests that if they depose Wigand, making his information public, it can give CBS cover to broadcast the information; Scruggs expresses interest.

Wigand receives an emailed death threat and finds a bullet in his mailbox. He contacts the FBI, but the agents who visit him are hostile and confiscate his computer. Furious, Wigand demands that Bergman arrange an interview, during which Wigand states that he was fired after objecting to Brown & Williamson intentionally making their cigarettes more addictive.

Bergman arranges a security detail for Wigand's home, and the Wigands experience marital stress. Wigand testifies in Mississippi, despite attempts of intimidation and legal suppression by Brown & Williamson attorneys. After returning home, he discovers that his wife Liane has left him and taken their daughters.

Eric Kluster, the president of CBS News, decides not to broadcast Wigand's interview after CBS legal counsel Helen Caperelli warns that the network is at risk of legal action from Brown & Williamson. Bergman confronts Kluster, accusing him of sacrificing journalistic integrity to protect the impending sale of CBS to Westinghouse, which would enrich both Kluster and Caperelli. Wallace and their executive producer Don Hewitt both side with Kluster. Wigand, learning of this, is appalled and terminates contact with Bergman.

Investigators probe Wigand's personal history and publish their findings in a 500-page dossier. Bergman learns that The Wall Street Journal intends to use it in a piece questioning Wigand's credibility. He convinces the Journal's editor to delay publication and assign journalists to investigate the dossier, claiming that it falsely quotes its sources.

After infighting at CBS over the Wigand segment, Bergman is ordered to take a "vacation" as the abridged 60 Minutes segment airs. Bergman contacts Wigand, who is both dejected and furious, accusing Bergman of manipulating him. Bergman defends himself and praises Wigand and his testimony. Scruggs urges Bergman to air the full segment to draw public support for their lawsuit, which is under threat from a lawsuit by Mississippi's governor. Bergman, frozen out, is unable to assist and privately questions his own motives pursuing the story.

Bergman contacts an editor at The New York Times, disclosing the full story and events at CBS. The Times prints the story on the front page and condemns CBS in a scathing editorial. The Journal dismisses the dossier as character assassination and prints Wigand's deposition. Hewitt accuses Bergman of betraying CBS, but finds that Wallace now agrees that bowing to corporate pressure was a mistake. 60 Minutes finally airs the original segment, including the full interview with Wigand. Bergman tells Wallace that he has resigned, believing that 60 Minutes's credibility and integrity are now permanently tarnished.

== Cast ==
- Al Pacino as Lowell Bergman
- Russell Crowe as Dr. Jeffrey Wigand
- Christopher Plummer as Mike Wallace
- Diane Venora as Liane Wigand
- Philip Baker Hall as Don Hewitt
- Lindsay Crouse as Sharon Tiller
- Debi Mazar as Debbie De Luca
- Renee Olstead as Deborah Wigand
- Hallie Kate Eisenberg as Barbara Wigand
- Stephen Tobolowsky as Eric Kluster
- Colm Feore as Richard Scruggs
- Bruce McGill as Ron Motley
- Gina Gershon as Helen Caperelli
- Michael Gambon as B&W CEO Thomas Sandefur
- Rip Torn as John Scanlon
- Cliff Curtis as Sheikh Fadlallah
- Gary Sandy as Sandefur's lawyer
- Roger Bart as Seelbach hotel manager
- Breckin Meyer as Sharon's son
- Jack Palladino as himself
- Mike Moore as himself
- Lynne Thigpen as Mrs. Williams
- Paul Butler as Charlie Phillips
- Wings Hauser as Tobacco Lawyer

== Production ==
For the scene in which the deposition hearing takes place, the filmmakers used the actual courtroom in Pascagoula, Mississippi, where the deposition was given.

== Accuracy ==
The Insider is adapted from "The Man Who Knew Too Much", an influential article on tobacco industry whistleblower Jeffrey Wigand, written by journalist Marie Brenner for the May 1996 issue of Vanity Fair.

Mike Wallace said that two-thirds of the film was quite accurate, but he disagreed with the film's portrayal of his role in the events. In particular, he objected to the impression that he would have taken a long time to protest CBS's corporate policies.

== Release ==
=== Box office ===
The Insider was released in 1,809 theaters on November 5, 1999, where it grossed a total of $6,712,361 on its opening weekend and ranked fourth in the country for that time period. It went on to earn $29.1 million in North America, and $31.2 million in the rest of the world, for a total of $60.3 million worldwide, significantly lower than its $90 million budget. The film was considered to be a commercial disappointment. Disney executives had hoped that Mann's film would have the same commercial and critical success as All the President's Men, a film in the same vein.

However, The Insider had limited appeal to younger moviegoers—studio executives reportedly said that the prime audience was over age 40—and the subject matter was "not notably dramatic", according to marketing executives. Then-Disney chairman Joe Roth said, "It's like walking up a hill with a refrigerator on your back. The fact of the matter is we're really proud we did this movie. People say it's the best movie they've seen this year. They say, 'Why don't we make more movies like this?'"

After the film received seven Academy-Award nominations but won none, Joe Roth said, "Everyone is really proud of the movie. But it's one of those rare times when adults loved a movie, yet they couldn't convince their friends to go see it, any more than we could convince people in marketing the film."

=== Critical reception ===
The Insider received some of the best reviews of 1999 and of Michael Mann's career. On Rotten Tomatoes, it has a 96% rating, based on 138 reviews, with an average rating of 8.1/10. The website's critical consensus reads: "Intelligent, compelling, and packed with strong performances, The Insider is a potent corporate thriller." On Metacritic, it has a score of 84 out of 100, based on reviews from 34 critics, indicating "universal acclaim". Audiences surveyed by CinemaScore gave the film a grade of "A−" on a scale of A+ to F.

Roger Ebert of the Chicago Sun-Times gave the film three-and-a-half stars out of four, and praised "its power to absorb, entertain, and anger".

Newsweek magazine's David Ansen wrote, "Mann could probably make a movie about needlepoint riveting. Employing a big canvas, a huge cast of superb character actors and his always exquisite eye for composition, he's made the kind of current-events epic that Hollywood has largely abandoned to TV—and shows us how movies can do it better."

In her review for The New York Times, Janet Maslin praised Russell Crowe as "a subtle powerhouse in his wrenching evocation of Wigand, takes on the thick, stolid look of the man he portrays", and felt that it was "by far Mann's most fully realized and enthralling work".

Time magazine's Richard Corliss wrote, "When Crowe gets to command the screen, The Insider comes to roiled life. It's an All the President's Men in which Deep Throat takes center stage, an insider prodded to spill the truth."

Rolling Stone magazine's Peter Travers wrote, "With its dynamite performances, strafing wit and dramatic provocation, The Insider offers Mann at his best—blood up, unsanitized, and unbowed."

Entertainment Weekly gave the film a "B" rating, and felt that it was "a good but far from great movie because it presents truth telling in America as far more imperiled than it is".

Director Quentin Tarantino included The Insider in his list of top 20 films released since 1992 (the year he became a director).

=== Accolades ===
Awards
Award	Date of ceremony	Category	Recipients	Result
Academy Awards	March 26, 2000	Best Picture	Michael Mann and Pieter Jan Brugge	Nominated
Academy Awards	March 26, 2000	Best Director	Michael Mann	Nominated
Academy Awards	March 26, 2000	Best Actor	Russell Crowe	Nominated
Academy Awards	March 26, 2000	Best Screenplay – Based on Material Previously Produced or Published	Michael Mann and Eric Roth	Nominated
Academy Awards	March 26, 2000	Best Cinematography	Dante Spinotti	Nominated
Academy Awards	March 26, 2000	Best Film Editing	William Goldenberg, Paul Rubell and David Rosenbloom	Nominated
Academy Awards	March 26, 2000	Best Sound	Andy Nelson, Doug Hemphill and Lee Orloff	Nominated
British Academy Film Awards	April 9, 2000	Best Actor in a Leading Role	Russell Crowe	Nominated
Boston Society of Film Critics	December 12, 1999	Best Supporting Actor	Christopher Plummer	Won
Critics' Choice Movie Awards	January 24, 2000	Best Actor	Russell Crowe	Won
Golden Globe Awards	January 23, 2000	Best Motion Picture – Drama		Nominated
Golden Globe Awards	January 23, 2000	Best Actor in a Motion Picture – Drama	Russell Crowe	Nominated
Golden Globe Awards	January 23, 2000	Best Director	Michael Mann	Nominated
Golden Globe Awards	January 23, 2000	Best Screenplay	Michael Mann and Eric Roth	Nominated
Golden Globe Awards	January 23, 2000	Best Original Score	Pieter Bourke and Lisa Gerrard	Nominated
London Film Critics' Circle	March 2, 2000	Best Actor	Russell Crowe	Nominated
Los Angeles Film Critics Association	December 1999	Best Film		Won
Los Angeles Film Critics Association	December 1999	Best Director	Michael Mann	Nominated
Los Angeles Film Critics Association	December 1999	Best Actor	Russell Crowe	Won
Los Angeles Film Critics Association	December 1999	Best Supporting Actor	Christopher Plummer	Won
Los Angeles Film Critics Association	December 1999	Best Cinematography	Dante Spinotti	Won
National Society of Film Critics	January 8, 2000	Best Actor	Russell Crowe	Won
National Society of Film Critics	January 8, 2000	Best Supporting Actor	Christopher Plummer	Won
Screen Actors Guild Awards	March 12, 2000	Outstanding Performance by a Male Actor in a Leading Role	Russell Crowe	Nominated
Satellite Awards	January 16, 2000	Best Motion Picture – Drama		Won
Satellite Awards	January 16, 2000	Best Director	Michael Mann	Won
Satellite Awards	January 16, 2000	Best Actor in a Motion Picture – Drama	Russell Crowe	Nominated
Satellite Awards	January 16, 2000	Best Actor in a Motion Picture – Drama	Al Pacino	Nominated
Satellite Awards	January 16, 2000	Best Supporting Actor in a Motion Picture – Drama	Christopher Plummer	Nominated
Satellite Awards	January 16, 2000	Best Editing		Nominated

In 2006, Premiere ranked Crowe's performance #23 of the 100 Greatest Performances of All Time. Eric Roth and Michael Mann won the Humanitas Prize in the Feature Film category in 2000.

== Soundtrack ==
The Insider (Music from the Motion Picture)

Soundtrack album by Various artists
- Released: October 26, 1999
- Recorded: 1999
- Genre: Soundtrack
- Label: Sony
- Producers: Lisa Gerrard and Pieter Bourke; Graeme Revell

All tracks are written by Lisa Gerrard and Pieter Bourke, unless otherwise stated. All tracks are also performed by Gerrard and Bourke, unless otherwise stated.

Track listing for The Insider (Music from the Motion Picture)
No.	Title	Writer(s)	Performer(s)	Length
1.	"Tempest"	Lisa Gerrard; Madjid Khaladj; Pieter Bourke		2:50
2.	"Dawn of the Truth"			1:59
3.	"Sacrifice"			7:41
4.	"The Subordinate"			1:17
5.	"Exile"			1:39
6.	"The Silencer"			1:36
7.	"Broken"			2:03
8.	"Faith"			3:01
9.	"I'm Alone On This"	Graeme Revell	Revell	2:02
10.	"LB in Montana"	Revell	Revell	0:50
11.	"Palladino Montage"	Revell	Revell	0:43
12.	"Iguazu"	Gustavo Santaolalla	Santaolalla	3:10
13.	"Liquid Moon"			4:05
14.	"Rites" (Edit)	Jan Garbarek	Garbarek	5:33
15.	"Safe from Harm" (Perfecto Mix)	Daddy G; Andrew Vowles; Robert Del Naja; Shara Nelson; Billy Cobham	Massive Attack; Paul Oakenfold; Steve Osborne	8:11
16.	"Meltdown"			5:40
Total length:				52:29

Other music in the film

- "Uotaaref Men Elihabek"—Casbah Orchestra
- "Suffocate", "Hot Shots" and "Night Stop"—Curt Sobel
- "Litany"—Arvo Pärt
- "Smokey Mountain Waltz"—Richard Gilks
- "Armenia"—Einstürzende Neubauten
- "Two or Three Things"—David Darling

== See also ==
- Tobacco Master Settlement Agreement
- 60 Minutes Brown & Williamson controversy
