= Mr. Death: The Rise and Fall of Fred A. Leuchter, Jr. =

1999 film by Errol Morris

- Theatrical poster
- Directed by: Errol Morris
- Produced by: Dorothy Aufiero; David Collins; Errol Morris; Michael Williams
- Starring: Fred A. Leuchter
- Cinematography: Peter Donahue
- Edited by: Karen Schmeer
- Music by: Caleb Sampson
- Distributed by: Lions Gate Films
- Release dates: September 16, 1999 (Toronto Film Festival); December 29, 1999 (USA)
- Running time: 91 minutes
- Country: United States
- Language: English
- Box office: $507,941 (US and Canada)

Mr. Death: The Rise and Fall of Fred A. Leuchter, Jr. is a 1999 American documentary film by Errol Morris about execution technician Fred A. Leuchter.

== Synopsis ==
Using film made at American prisons, Leuchter talks about his upbringing where his father was a corrections officer. Through his family associations, young Leuchter claimed he was able to witness an execution performed in an electric chair. Leuchter's impression of the event was that the electric chairs used by American prisons were unsafe and often ineffective. The event led him to design modifications to the device that were adopted by many American states.

Leuchter claims he was invited to other American prisons to inspect and design modifications to their electric chairs. He possessed no relevant formal training or education, and claims that he was told that those who did possess such qualifications would not provide advice due to their opinions on the death penalty, fear of reprisals or that they were squeamish about the subject.

Leuchter's career continued with other state prisons seeking his advice on execution facilities other than electrocution, such as gas chambers, hanging and lethal injection. Though Leuchter initially professed his ignorance of other methods of execution, the authorities seeking his advice reminded him that others with more qualifications refused to help. Leuchter claims to have taught himself on these other methods of execution and provided advice that was used by the authorities to improve safety and efficiency.

His fall began when Leuchter claimed to have been sought as a witness for the defence of Ernst Zündel during the trial R v Zundel in Canada for "spreading false news" by publishing and sending material denying the Holocaust overseas. Leuchter was asked by the defence to travel to Poland to visit Auschwitz to investigate whether there had been operating gas chambers for executions at the camp.

At his first examination Leuchter felt that using poison gas in a building with the internal and external design of the buildings currently on display in the site would have caused the death of everyone in the area outside the buildings as well as inside. The film shows videotape footage taken in Poland of Leuchter taking samples of bricks in the buildings to take back to the United States forensic science crime labs to determine whether there was evidence of poison gas in the material, these samples were not identified as to where they came from. Leuchter states that the laboratories reported that there was not any trace of any poison gas at any time.

After Leuchter's conclusions were disproven and negative publicity ensued, Leuchter lost his work as consultant to American prisons.

== Background ==
When Morris originally screened an early version of the film for a Harvard University film class, he found that the students reacted by either believing Leuchter's side of the story or by condemning the film as a piece of Holocaust denial. Morris had no such intention, however, as Morris had considered it obvious that Leuchter was wrong, and that the main idea of the film was intended to be the exploration of Leuchter as a being almost completely lacking in self-knowledge:

The Holocaust has been used in movies as a way of increasing drama in a sense that the triumph of the human spirit never looked so triumphant against the horrors. This movie attempts to do something very different. It's to try to enter the mindset of denial. You are asked to reflect on the whole idea of denial in general, not as some postwar phenomenon but as something that was inherent in the enterprise itself. You would think it would be the easiest thing in the world to identify this behavior as wrong, horrific, depraved. Those people did these things. To me, the question is how. With Mr. Death, it's about finding out why Fred Leuchter holds these views.

Thus, the "fall" of Leuchter's life is portrayed not as a result of any particular ill feelings toward the Jewish people or passionate support for revisionist history, but rather as an absurd man bumbling into making statements generally considered to be offensive and contrary to known facts. Errol Morris re-edited the film to include additional interviews with people who condemn Leuchter with varying intensity. Morris said this last part should have been unnecessary, since, to him, Leuchter was so obviously misguided in much of what he says in the film.

In the course of the film Leuchter states that he could not believe in the gas chambers because he could not himself conceive of their mechanics, although he makes it evident that he knows very little of the history in which these arose. He suggests a series of options (hanging, shooting, and explosives), most of which the Nazis had attempted (shootings and explosives) before determining that direct, ongoing, and extensive SS involvement would not be sufficient to achieve the genocidal objectives they set for themselves after earlier forays into mass murder, such as Einsatzgruppen and Babi Yar. Leuchter similarly appears unaware of the T-4 Euthanasia Program and the history or science behind small-scale gassings directed by Hitler's Reich Chancellery and then the SS.

Morris examines but does not pursue either Leuchter's opposition to gas as a means of execution, or his imputed lack of practical experience with it. Leuchter's concern with the safety of gassing methods appears to be a cause of his disbelief in its viability as he believed the venting process would pose a serious threat to the operators. His critics reply:

Nonsense; it is all a question of concentration. Once the gas is released into the atmosphere, its concentration decreases and it is no longer dangerous. Also, HCN dissipates quickly. The execution gas chambers in US prisons are also ventilated directly into the atmosphere. Furthermore, if this argument would hold for the extermination chambers, it would hold for the delousing chambers as well, and one would have to conclude that no delousing chambers existed either.

Robert Jan van Pelt appears in Mr. Death to detail some of Leuchter's scholarly failures (e.g. not consulting the large documentation archive available at Auschwitz).

== Production ==
Morris was not fond of the film title and had wanted to name it "Honeymoon in Auschwitz", which Leuchter had, in fact, done.

The soundtrack was composed by Caleb Sampson, who previously scored Fast, Cheap & Out of Control.

== Critical reception ==
The film received critical acclaim, currently having a 100% positive score on Rotten Tomatoes based on 36 reviews. The website's critics consensus reads, "Mr. Death outlines its subject's controversial life's work with the deeply fascinating and thought-provoking élan film fans have come to expect from director Errol Morris." Film critic Roger Ebert said the film was great, strange and provocative. The Detroit News wrote that the movie "unmasks the friendly face of evil."
