= Richard Farnsworth =

American actor (1920–2000)

- Farnsworth in The Straight Story, his final role
- Born: Richard William Farnsworth; September 1, 1920; Fairfield, Washington, U.S.
- Died: October 6, 2000 (aged 80); Lincoln, New Mexico, U.S.
- Resting place: Forest Lawn Memorial Park, Hollywood Hills, California
- Occupations: Stuntman, actor
- Years active: 1937–1999
- Spouse: Margaret Hill (m. 1947; died 1985)
- Children: 2

Richard William Farnsworth (September 1, 1920 – October 6, 2000) was an American actor and stuntman. He was twice nominated for an Academy Award: in 1978 for Best Supporting Actor for Comes a Horseman, and in 2000 for Best Actor in The Straight Story, making him the second-oldest nominee for the award for the latter. Farnsworth was also known for his performances in The Grey Fox (1982), for which he received a Golden Globe Award nomination for Best Actor in a Motion Picture – Drama, as well as Anne of Green Gables (1985), Sylvester (1985), and Misery (1990).

== Early life ==
Farnsworth was born on September 1, 1920, in Fairfield, Washington. His mother was a homemaker and his father was an engineer. After high school he enlisted in the United States Air Force during WWII, where he served as a pilot in the 344th Bombardment Group with the rank of First Lieutenant and received the Silver Star medal for gallantry and bravery in combat.

== Career ==
Farnsworth gradually moved into acting in Western movies. He made uncredited appearances in numerous films, including Gone with the Wind (1939), Red River (1948), The Wild One (1953), and The Ten Commandments (1956). In 1960, credited as Dick Farnsworth, he appeared as a Gault ranch hand in the "Street of Hate" episode of the TV Western Laramie.

He received his first acting credit in a film in 1963 and went on to act in many Western films and television shows. He had a role in Roots (1977) and co-starred with Wilford Brimley in The Boys of Twilight (1992). He received a nomination for the Academy Award for Best Supporting Actor for the Alan J. Pakula film Comes a Horseman (1978). A breakthrough came when he starred as stagecoach robber Bill Miner in the 1982 Canadian film The Grey Fox. He appeared as a baseball coach in The Natural (1984). In 1985, he played the brother to Marilla and father figure to Anne in Anne of Green Gables and starred as a soft-spoken, sage cowboy with horse training wisdom for Melissa Gilbert in Sylvester. His other prominent roles included a wealthy and ruthless oil man in The Two Jakes (1990) and the suspicious sheriff in the film version of Stephen King's Misery (1990). His final role was playing Alvin Straight in the David Lynch film The Straight Story (1999), for which he received a nomination for the Academy Award for Best Actor.

== Personal life and death ==
Farnsworth had a long marriage and had two children. After becoming a widower, he lived on a ranch in Lincoln, New Mexico.

On the night of October 6, 2000, suffering from terminal cancer that left him partially paralyzed and in great pain, Farnsworth died from a self-inflicted gunshot wound at his ranch in Lincoln.

== Filmography ==
=== Film ===
| Year | Title | Role | Notes |
|---|---|---|---|
| 1937 | A Day at the Races | Jockey | Uncredited |
| 1938 | The Adventures of Marco Polo | Mongol Warrior | Uncredited |
| 1939 | Gunga Din | Bit Part | Uncredited |
| 1939 | Gone with the Wind | Soldier | Uncredited |
| 1943 | This Is the Army | Soldier | Uncredited |
| 1948 | Red River | Dunston Rider | Uncredited |
| 1948 | The Paleface | Minor Role | Uncredited |
| 1949 | Mighty Joe Young | Cowboy | Uncredited |
| 1950 | The Flame and the Arrow | Outlaw | Uncredited |
| 1953 | Arena | Cowboy | Uncredited |
| 1953 | Arrowhead | Cavalryman | Uncredited |
| 1953 | The Wild One | Unknown | Uncredited |
| 1954 | The Violent Men | Anchor Rider | Uncredited |
| 1955 | A Lawless Street | Townsman | Uncredited |
| 1956 | The Ten Commandments | Chariot Driver | Uncredited |
| 1957 | The Tin Star | Unknown | Uncredited |
| 1957 | The Hard Man | Posse Man | Uncredited |
| 1960 | Spartacus | Salt Mine Slave / Gladiator / Slave General | Uncredited |
| 1963 | The Jolly Genie | Thug | Short subject |
| 1966 | Duel at Diablo | Wagon Driver #1 | Uncredited |
| 1966 | Texas Across the River | Medicine Man | |
| 1968 | The Stalking Moon | Unknown | Uncredited |
| 1970 | Monte Walsh | Cowboy | |
| 1971 | Skin Game | Man In Saloon Fight | Uncredited |
| 1972 | The Cowboys | Henry Williams | |
| 1972 | Pocket Money | Man | Uncredited |
| 1972 | Ulzana's Raid | Trooper | |
| 1972 | The Life and Times of Judge Roy Bean | Outlaw | |
| 1973 | The Soul of Nigger Charley | Walker | |
| 1973 | Papillon | Manhunter #1 | Uncredited |
| 1974 | Blazing Saddles | Sheriff | Uncredited |
| 1975 | The Apple Dumpling Gang | Mover | Uncredited |
| 1976 | The Duchess and the Dirtwater Fox | Stagecoach Driver | |
| 1976 | The Outlaw Josey Wales | Comanchero | Uncredited |
| 1977 | Another Man, Another Chance | Stagecoach Driver | |
| 1978 | Comes a Horseman | Dodger | |
| 1980 | Tom Horn | John C. Coble | |
| 1980 | Ruckus | Sheriff Jethro Pough | |
| 1980 | Resurrection | Esco | |
| 1981 | The Legend of the Lone Ranger | 'Wild Bill' Hickok | |
| 1982 | The Grey Fox | Bill Miner | |
| 1982 | Waltz Across Texas | Frank Walker | |
| 1983 | Independence Day | Evan | |
| 1984 | The Natural | 'Red' Blow | |
| 1984 | Rhinestone | Noah Farris | |
| 1985 | Into the Night | Jack Caper | |
| 1985 | Sylvester | Foster | |
| 1985 | Space Rage | Colonel | |
| 1988 | The River Pirates | Percy | |
| 1990 | The Two Jakes | Earl Rawley | |
| 1990 | Misery | Sheriff Buster | |
| 1990 | Havana | Professor | |
| 1992 | Highway to Hell | Sam | |
| 1994 | The Getaway | 'Slim' | |
| 1994 | Lassie | Len Collins | |
| 1999 | The Straight Story | Alvin Straight | |

=== Television ===
| Year | Title | Role | Notes |
|---|---|---|---|
| 1951 | The Adventures of Kit Carson | Henchman (uncredited) | Episode: "Fury at Red Gulch"; Episode: "The Desperate Sheriff" |
| 1954 | The Adventures of Kit Carson | Army Wagon Driver | Episode: "The Gatling Gun" |
| 1955 | Soldiers of Fortune | 'Gaucho' (uncredited) | Episode: "The General" |
| 1956 | Zane Grey Theatre | Trooper | Episode: "Star Over Texas" |
| 1958 | The Adventures of Wild Bill Hickok | Butler | Episode: "Jingles on the Jailroad" |
| 1958 | Cimarron City | Ira Youngman | Episode: "Twelve Guns", uncredited |
| 1959 | State Trooper | Caleb Smith | Episode: "Lonely Valley" |
| 1959 | The Rebel | Trooper | Episode: "Yellow Hair" |
| 1960 | Wanted: Dead or Alive | Rance / Hal | Episodes: "The Partners" & "To the Victor" |
| 1960 | Laramie | Gault Ranch Hand / Manley (uncredited) | Episodes: "Street of Hate" & "Ride into Darkness" |
| 1961 | Laramie | Hank | Episode: "The Tumbleweed Wagon" |
| 1965 | The Big Valley | Bolin | Episode: "The Odyssey of Jubal Tanner" |
| 1966 | The Big Valley | Businessman | Episode: "Image of Yesterday" |
| 1967 | Cimarron Strip | Dusty Rhodes / Benefiel | Episodes: "Journey to a Hanging" & "The Battleground" |
| 1970 | The High Chaparral | Lloyd | Episode: "The Long Shadow" |
| 1971 | Bonanza | Sourdough | Episode: "Top Hand" |
| 1972 | Bonanza | Tate / Troy | Episodes: "The Saddle Stiff" & "He Was Only Seven" |
| 1974 | Honky Tonk | Driver | TV movie |
| 1975 | Strange New World | Elder | TV movie |
| 1977 | Roots | Trumbull | TV miniseries |
| 1977 | Little House on the Prairie | Wall | Episode: "Quarantine" |
| 1981 | The Texas Rangers | Ranger J.W. Stevens | TV movie |
| 1981 | A Few Days in Weasel Creek | Jason Stayvey | TV movie |
| 1981 | The Cherokee Trail | Ridge Fenton | TV movie |
| 1983 | Travis McGee | Van Harder | TV movie |
| 1983 | Ghost Dancing | Russ Ward | TV movie |
| 1985 | Wild Horses | Chuck Reese | TV movie |
| 1985 | Chase | Judge Grand Pettitt | TV movie |
| 1985 | Anne of Green Gables | Matthew Cuthbert | TV movie |
| 1987 | CBS Summer Playhouse | Carl | Episode: "Travelin' Man" |
| 1987 | Highway to Heaven | Grandpa Jet Sanders | Episode: "A Dream of Wild Horses" |
| 1989 | Red Earth, White Earth | Helmer | TV movie |
| 1989 | Desperado: The Outlaw Wars | Sheriff Campbell / Bisby Arizona | TV movie |
| 1992 | The Boys of Twilight | Sheriff Cody McPherson | 5 episodes |
| 1993 | The Fire Next Time | Frank Morgan | TV movie |
| 1998 | Best Friends for Life | Will Harper | TV movie |

== Awards and nominations ==
Comes a Horseman (1979)

- National Board of Review Award for Best Supporting Actor (won)
- National Society of Film Critics Award for Best Supporting Actor (won, tied with Robert Morley in Who Is Killing the Great Chefs of Europe?)
- Academy Award for Best Supporting Actor (nominated)
- New York Film Critics Circle Award for Best Supporting Actor (runner-up)

The Grey Fox (1982)

- Genie Award for Best Performance by a Foreign Actor (won)
- London Film Critics' Circle Award for Actor of the Year (won, tied with James Mason in The Shooting Party)
- Taormina Film Fest: Golden Mask (won)
- Golden Globe Award for Best Actor – Motion Picture Drama (nominated)

Anne of Green Gables (1985)

- Gemini Award for Best Performance by a Supporting Actor (won)

Chase (1985)

- Golden Globe Award for Best Supporting Actor – Series, Miniseries or Television Film (nominated)

The Straight Story (1999)

- Ft. Lauderdale International Film Festival Award for Best Actor (won)
- Independent Spirit Award for Best Male Lead (won)
- New York Film Critics Circle Award for Best Actor (won)
- Academy Award for Best Actor (nominated)
- Chicago Film Critics Association Award for Best Actor (nominated)
- Golden Globe Award for Best Actor – Motion Picture Drama (nominated)
- Las Vegas Film Critics Society Award for Best Actor (nominated)
- Los Angeles Film Critics Association Award for Best Actor (runner-up)
- Online Film Critics Society Award for Best Actor (nominated)
- Satellite Award for Best Actor Motion Picture – Drama (nominated)
- Southeastern Film Critics Association Award for Best Actor (runner-up)

Note: Farnsworth was inducted into the Hall of Great Western Performers at the National Cowboy & Western Heritage Museum in Oklahoma City, Oklahoma, in 1997. In addition, Farnsworth received a Hollywood Walk of Fame star for his contributions in the motion pictures on August 17, 1992; the star is located at 1560 Vine Street.

== See also ==
- List of oldest and youngest Academy Award winners and nominees — Best Actor in a Leading Role
- List of actors with Academy Award nominations
- List of actors with more than one Academy Award nomination in the acting categories
