= A Map of the World (film) =

1999 American drama film

- Theatrical release poster
- Directed by: Scott Elliott
- Screenplay by: Peter Hedges; Polly Platt
- Based on: A Map of the World by Jane Hamilton
- Produced by: Kathleen Kennedy; Frank Marshall
- Starring: Sigourney Weaver; Julianne Moore; David Strathairn; Arliss Howard; Chloë Sevigny; Louise Fletcher
- Cinematography: Seamus McGarvey
- Edited by: Naomi Geraghty; Craig McKay
- Music by: Pat Metheny
- Production companies: Kennedy/Marshall; Overseas Filmgroup; First Look Studios
- Distributed by: USA Films
- Release dates: September 13, 1999 (TIFF); January 21, 2000 (USA)
- Running time: 125 minutes
- Country: United States
- Language: English
- Box office: $544,538

A Map of the World is a 1999 American drama film, based on the 1994 novel by Jane Hamilton. Directed by Scott Elliott and produced by Kathleen Kennedy and Frank Marshall, the film stars Sigourney Weaver, Julianne Moore and David Strathairn. Weaver was nominated for a Golden Globe Award for Best Actress in a Motion Picture Drama for her performance.

== Synopsis ==
Alice Goodwin is a school nurse who lives with her husband Howard and two girls on a small dairy farm in Wisconsin. After the death of the daughter of her friend Theresa Collins on Alice's property, the couple watch helplessly as the community turns against them. To make matters worse, Alice finds herself fighting charges of child abuse.

== Cast ==
- Sigourney Weaver as Alice Goodwin
- Julianne Moore as Theresa Collins
- David Strathairn as Howard Goodwin
- Arliss Howard as Paul Reverdy
- Chloë Sevigny as Carole Mackessy
- Sara Rue as Debbie
- Aunjanue Ellis as Dyshett
- Nicole Ari Parker as Sherry
- Bruklin Harris as Lynelle
- Lisa Emery as Susan Durkin
- Ron Lea as Dan Collins
- Louise Fletcher as Nellie Goodwin

In addition, Emma and Claire Goodwin, the young daughters of Weaver's character, were played by real-life sisters Dara and Kayla Perlmutter.

== Reception ==
=== Critical response ===
On Rotten Tomatoes, 67% of 55 reviews are positive, and the average rating is 6.4/10. The critics consensus states, "Disjointed storytelling overshadows noteworthy performances." On Metacritic, the film has an average score of 65 based on reviews from 25 critics, indicating "generally favorable reviews".

Film critic Roger Ebert gave the film three and a half out of four stars, praising the performances, and likening it to such movies as Being John Malkovich and Three Kings in "being free—in being capable of taking any turn at any moment, without the need to follow tired conventions".

=== Awards and nominations ===
Year	Award / Festival	Category	Recipient(s)	Result
1999	National Board of Review	Special Recognition for Excellence in Filmmaking	A Map of the World	Won
1999	National Board of Review	Best Supporting Actress	Julianne Moore (also for Magnolia and An Ideal Husband)	Won
1999	San Sebastián International Film Festival	Golden Shell	Scott Elliott	Nominated
2000	National Society of Film Critics Awards	Best Supporting Actress	Julianne Moore (also for Magnolia, Cookie's Fortune and An Ideal Husband)	Nominated
2000	Golden Satellite Awards	Best Screenplay – Adapted	Peter Hedges and Polly Platt	Nominated
2000	Golden Satellite Awards	Best Actress – Drama	Sigourney Weaver	Nominated
2000	Golden Globe Awards	Best Actress in a Motion Picture – Drama	Sigourney Weaver	Nominated
2000	Cairo International Film Festival	Golden Pyramid	Scott Elliott	Nominated
