= 4th Golden Satellite Awards =

Awards ceremony for film and television

- Date: January 16, 2000

Highlights
- Best drama film: The Insider
- Best comedy/musical film: Being John Malkovich
- Best television drama: The West Wing
- Best television musical/comedy: Action
- Best director: Michael Mann for The Insider

The 4th Golden Satellite Awards, given by the International Press Academy, were awarded on January 16, 2000.

== Special achievement awards ==
Mary Pickford Award (for outstanding contribution to the entertainment industry) – Maximilian Schell

Outstanding Contribution to New Media – Artisan Entertainment (for the Blair Witch Project website)

Outstanding New Talent – Haley Joel Osment (for The Sixth Sense)

Award for Career of Outstanding Service in the Entertainment Industry – Dale Olson

== Motion picture winners and nominees ==
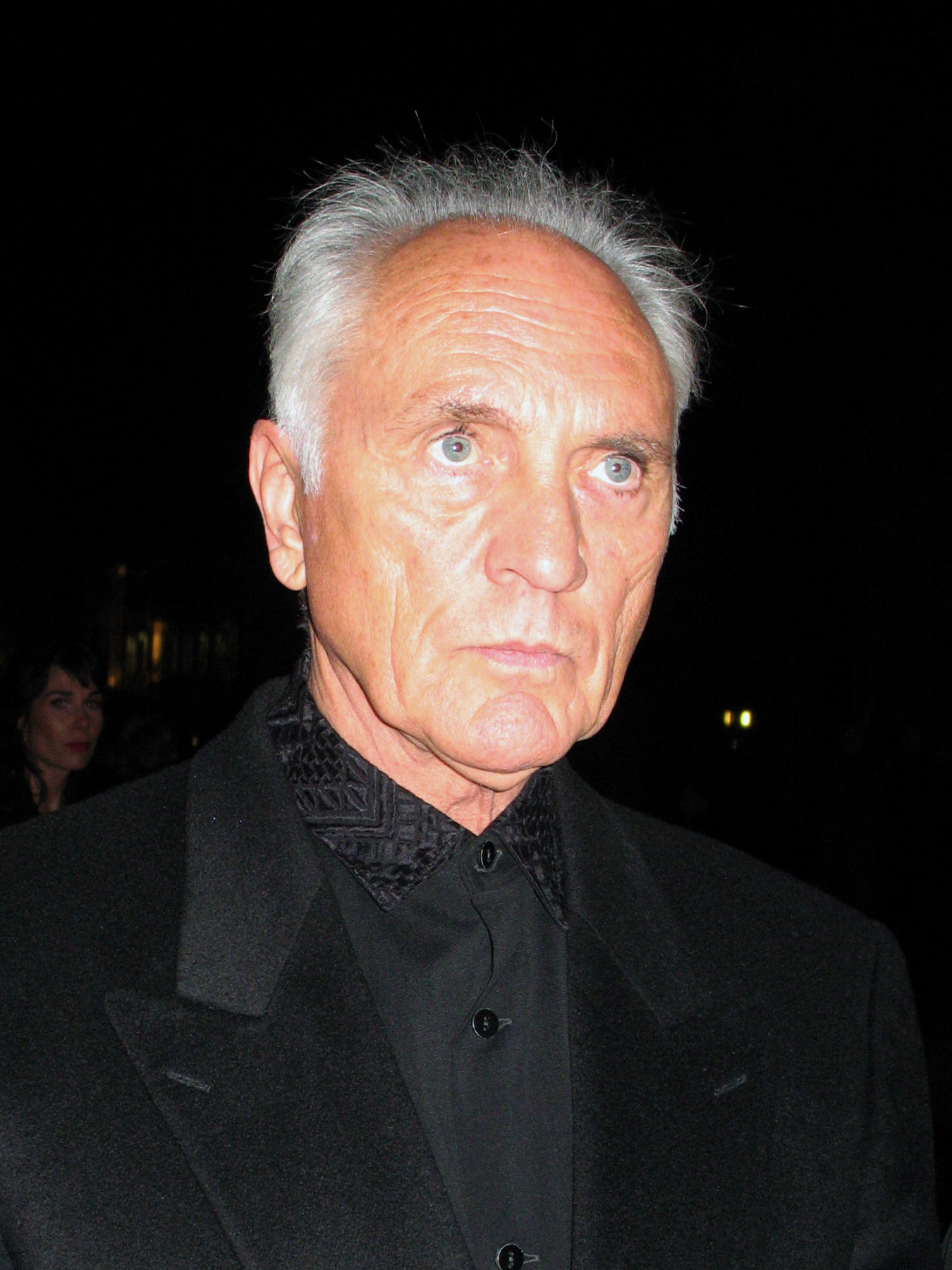
Terence Stamp – Best Actor in a Motion Picture, Drama

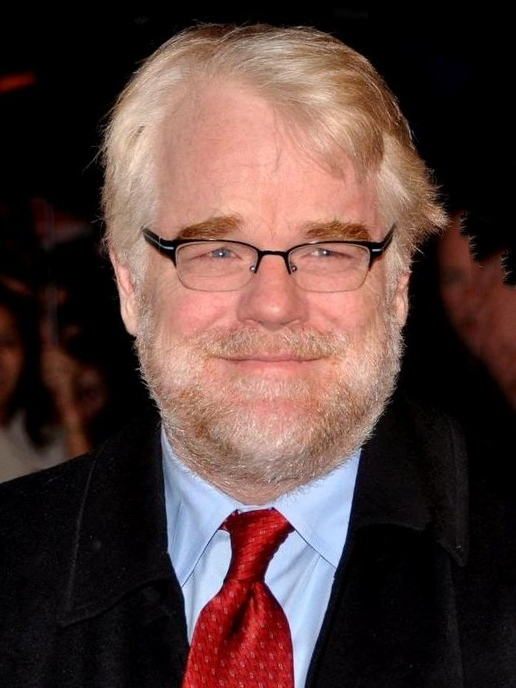
Philip Seymour Hoffman – Best Actor in a Motion Picture, Comedy or Musical

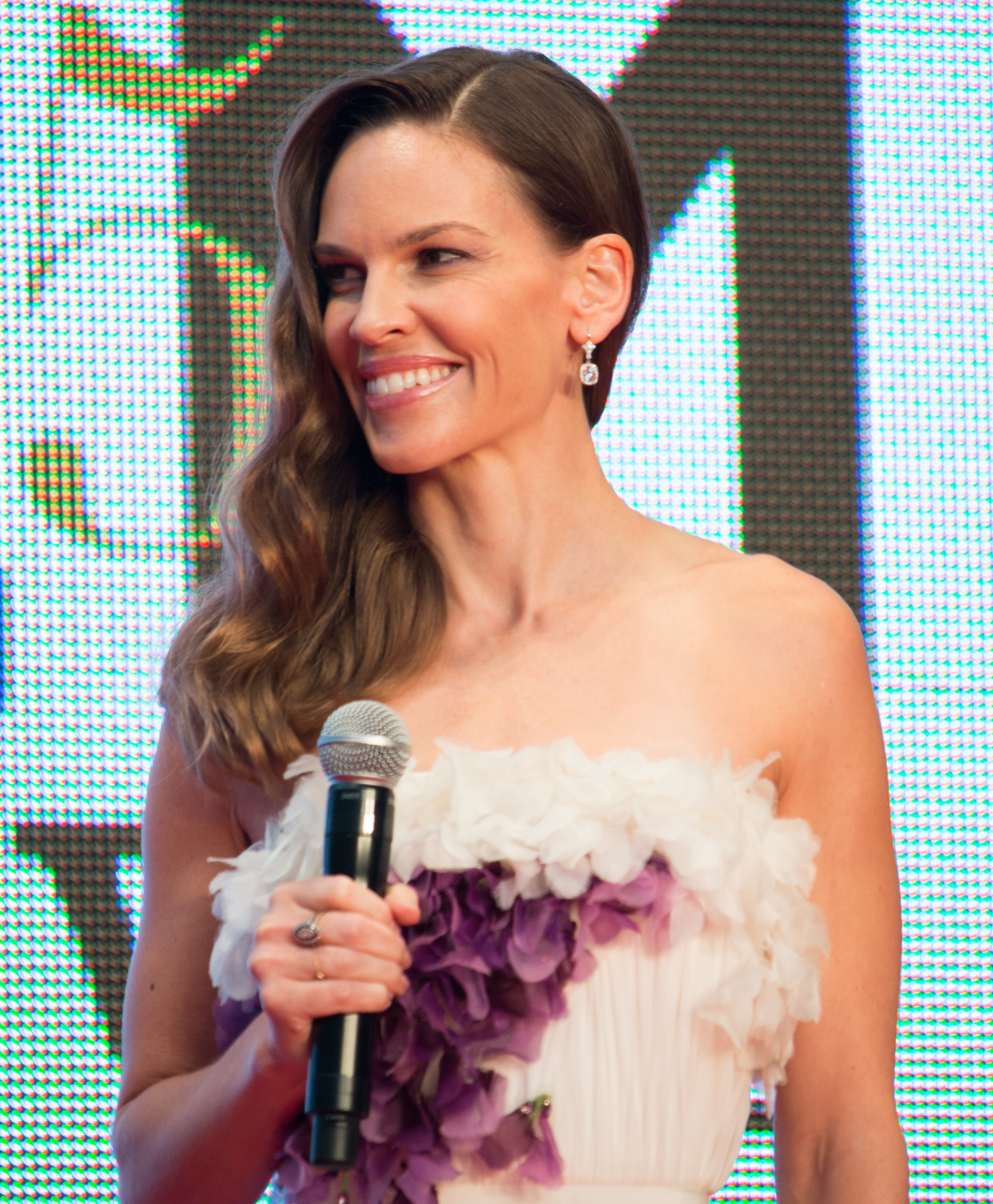
Hilary Swank – Best Actress in a Motion Picture, Drama

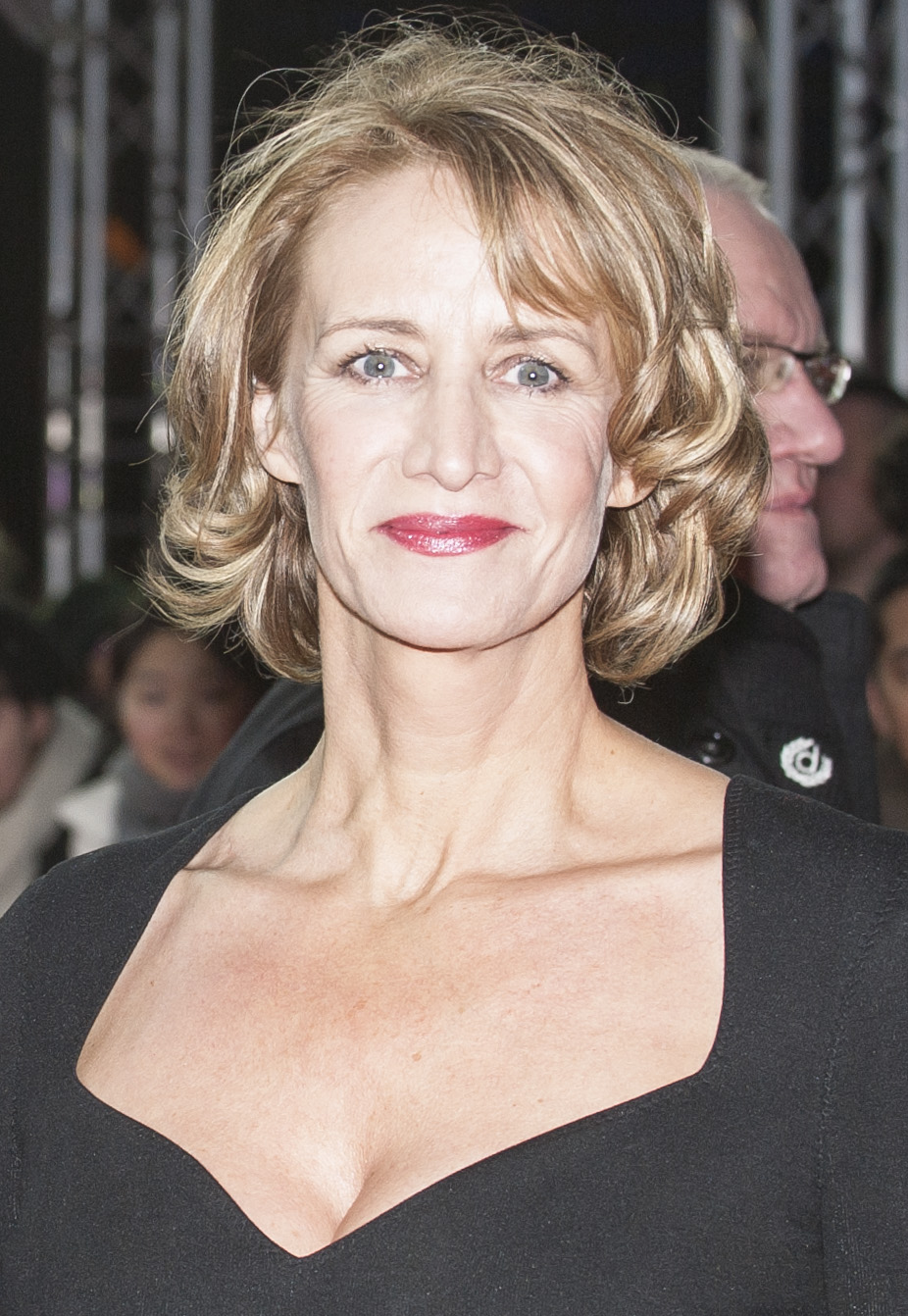
Janet McTeer – Best Actress in a Motion Picture, Comedy or Musical

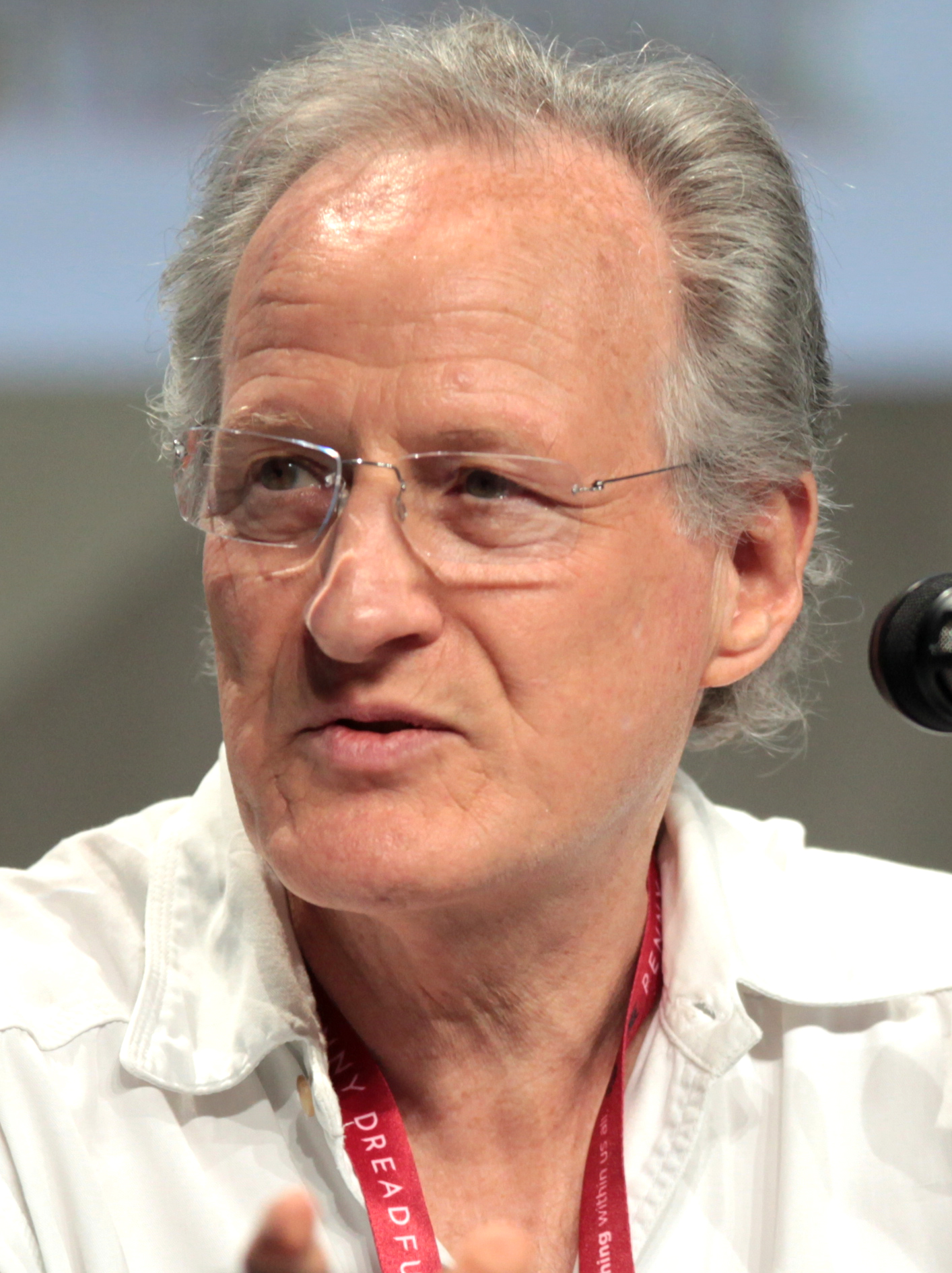
Michael Mann – Best Director

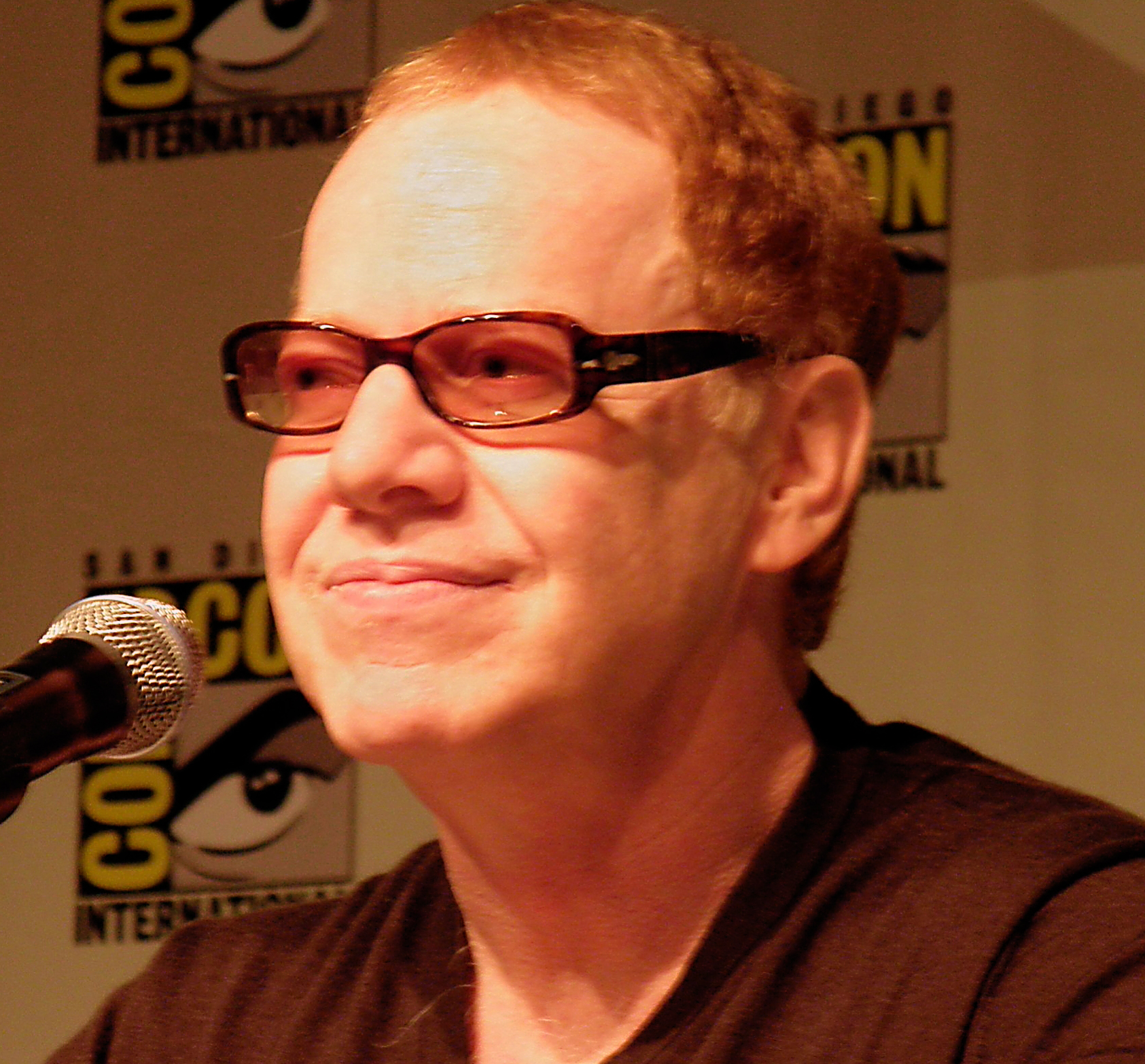
Danny Elfman – Best Original Score

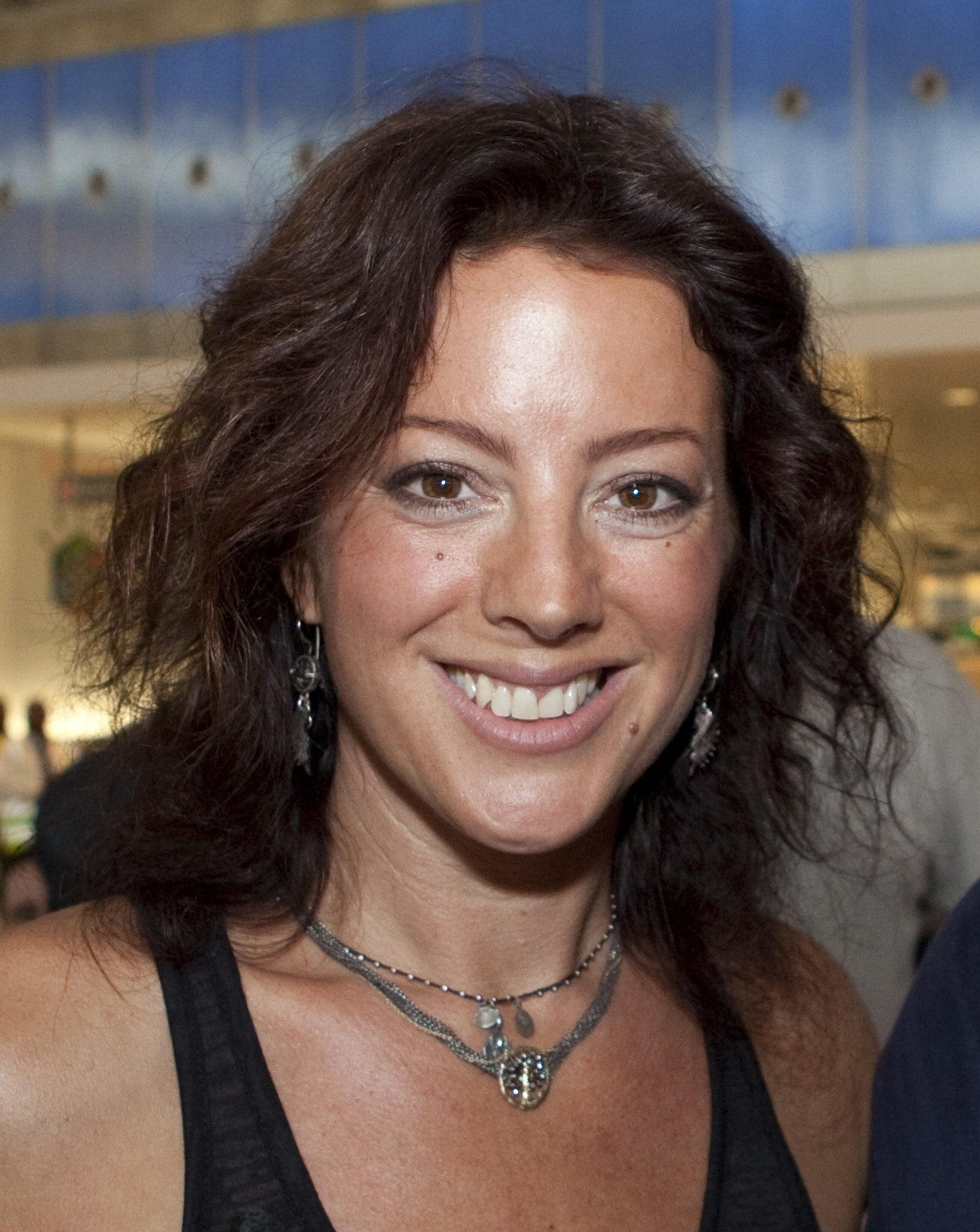
Sarah McLachlan – Best Original Song: "When Somebody Loved Me"

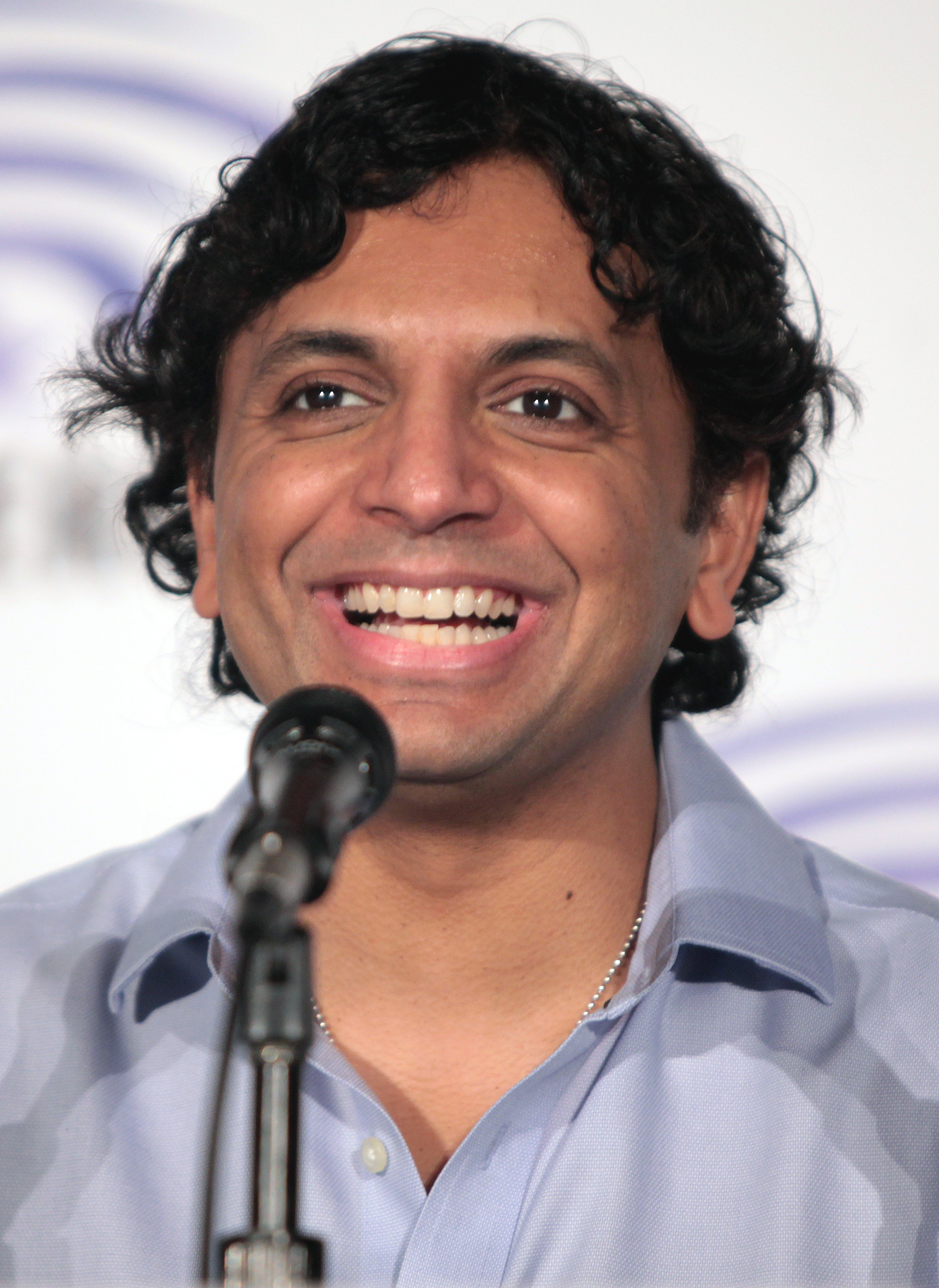
M. Night Shyamalan – Best Original Screenplay

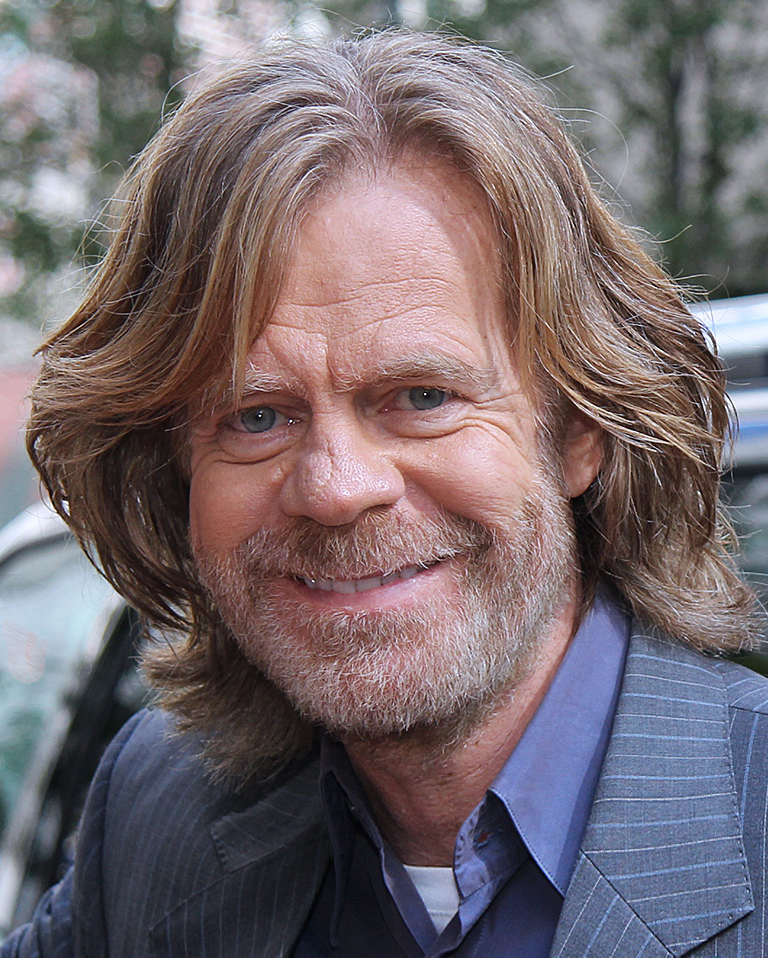
William H. Macy – Best Supporting Actor in a Motion Picture, Comedy or Musical & Best Actor in a Miniseries or Television Film

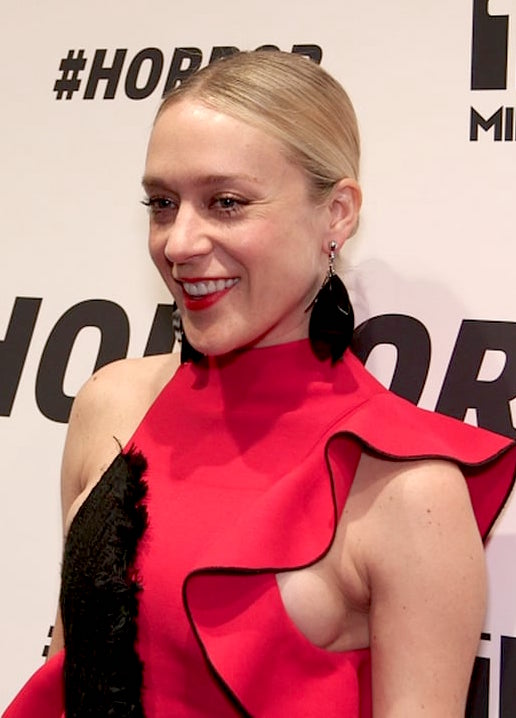
Chloe Sevigny – Best Supporting Actress in a Motion Picture, Drama

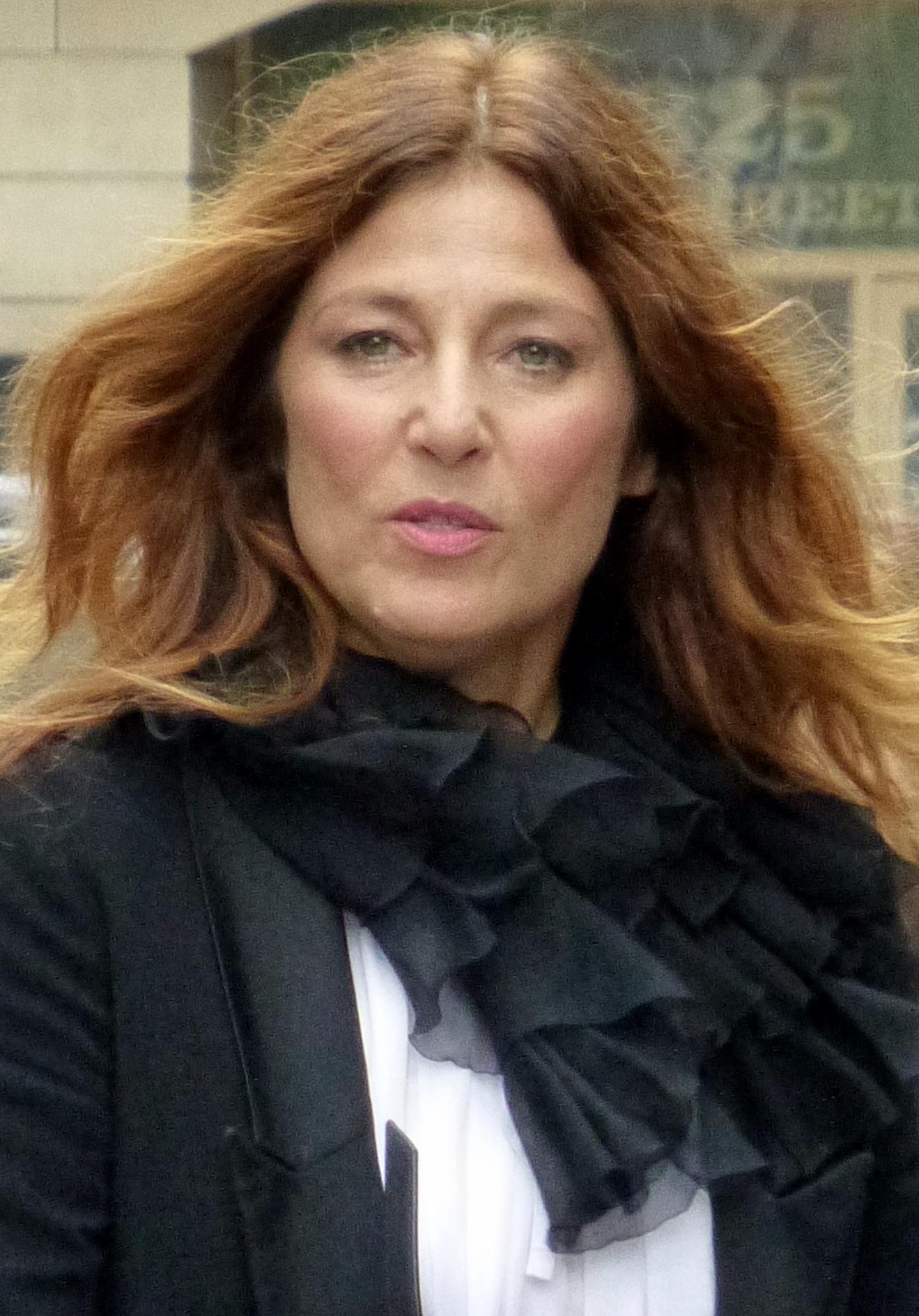
Catherine Keener – Best Supporting Actress in a Motion Picture, Comedy or Musical

=== Best Actor – Drama ===
Terence Stamp – The Limey

- Russell Crowe – The Insider
- Richard Farnsworth – The Straight Story
- Al Pacino – The Insider
- Kevin Spacey – American Beauty
- Denzel Washington – The Hurricane

=== Best Actor – Musical or Comedy ===
Philip Seymour Hoffman – Flawless

- Jim Carrey – Man on the Moon
- Johnny Depp – Sleepy Hollow
- Rupert Everett – An Ideal Husband
- Sean Penn – Sweet and Lowdown
- Steve Zahn – Happy, Texas

=== Best Actress – Drama ===
Hilary Swank – Boys Don't Cry

- Annette Bening – American Beauty
- Elaine Cassidy – Felicia's Journey
- Nicole Kidman – Eyes Wide Shut
- Youki Kudoh – Snow Falling on Cedars
- Sigourney Weaver – A Map of the World

=== Best Actress – Musical or Comedy ===
Janet McTeer – Tumbleweeds

- Julianne Moore – An Ideal Husband
- Frances O'Connor – Mansfield Park
- Julia Roberts – Notting Hill
- Cecilia Roth – All About My Mother (Todo sobre mi madre)
- Reese Witherspoon – Election

=== Best Animated or Mixed Media Film ===
Toy Story 2

- The Iron Giant
- Princess Mononoke (Mononoke-hime)
- South Park: Bigger Longer & Uncut
- Stuart Little
- Tarzan

=== Best Art Direction ===
Sleepy Hollow – Ken Court, John Dexter, Rick Heinrichs, Andy Nicholson, and Leslie Tomkins

- Anna and the King – Luciana Arrighi, Lek Chaiyan Chunsuttiwat, John Ralph, Paul Ghirardani
- An Ideal Husband – Michael Howells and Katie Lee
- The Emperor and the Assassin (Jing ke ci qin wang) – Weihua Ji and Juhua Tu
- The Legend of 1900 (La leggenda del pianista sull'oceano) – Francesca Frigeri and Bruno Cesari
- Titus – Dante Ferretti

=== Best Cinematography ===
Sleepy Hollow – Emmanuel Lubezki

- American Beauty – Conrad L. Hall
- Anna and the King – Caleb Deschanel
- Eyes Wide Shut – Larry Smith
- Snow Falling on Cedars – Robert Richardson
- The Talented Mr. Ripley – John Seale

=== Best Costume Design ===
Sleepy Hollow – Colleen Atwood

- Anna and the King – Jenny Beavan
- The Emperor and the Assassin (Jing ke ci qin wang) – Mo Xiaomin
- An Ideal Husband – Caroline Harris
- The Red Violin (Le violon rouge) – Renee April
- Titus – Milena Canonerro

=== Best Director ===
Michael Mann – The Insider

- Paul Thomas Anderson – Magnolia
- Scott Hicks – Snow Falling on Cedars
- Sam Mendes – American Beauty
- Anthony Minghella – The Talented Mr. Ripley
- Kimberly Peirce – Boys Don't Cry

=== Best Documentary Film ===
Buena Vista Social Club

- 42: Forty Two Up
- American Movie
- Mr. Death: The Rise and Fall of Fred A. Leuchter, Jr.
- Return with Honor
- The Source

=== Best Editing ===
The Sixth Sense – Andrew Mondshein

- American Beauty – Tariq Anwar and Christopher Greenbury
- Buena Vista Social Club – Brian Johnson
- The Insider – William Goldenberg, Paul Rubell, and David Rosenbloom
- Sleepy Hollow – Chris Lebenzon
- The Talented Mr. Ripley – Walter Murch

=== Best Film – Drama ===
The Insider

- American Beauty
- Boys Don't Cry
- Magnolia
- Snow Falling on Cedars
- The Talented Mr. Ripley

=== Best Film – Musical or Comedy ===
Being John Malkovich

- Bowfinger
- Dick
- Election
- An Ideal Husband
- Notting Hill

=== Best Foreign Language Film ===
All About My Mother (Todo sobre mi madre), Spain (TIE)
Three Seasons (Ba mua), Vietnam (TIE)

- The Emperor and the Assassin (Jing ke ci qin wang)
- The King of Masks (Biàn Liǎn)
- The Red Violin (Le violon rouge)
- Run Lola Run (Lola rennt)

=== Best Original Score ===
"Sleepy Hollow" – Danny Elfman

- "The Legend of 1900 (La leggenda del pianista sull'oceano)" – Ennio Morricone
- "Ravenous" – Damon Albarn and Michael Nyman
- "The Red Violin (Le violon rouge)" – John Corigliano
- "Snow Falling on Cedars" – James Newton Howard
- "The Thomas Crown Affair" – Bill Conti

=== Best Original Song ===
"When She Loved Me" performed by Sarah McLachlan – Toy Story 2

- "Get Lost" – The Story of Us
- "Mountain Town" – South Park: Bigger Longer & Uncut
- "Save Me" – Magnolia
- "Still" – Dogma
- "The World Is Not Enough" – The World Is Not Enough

=== Best Screenplay – Adapted ===
The Cider House Rules – John Irving

- Felicia's Journey – Atom Egoyan
- A Map of the World – Peter Hedges and Polly Platt
- Onegin – Peter Ettedgui and Michael Ignatieff
- The Talented Mr. Ripley – Anthony Minghella
- Titus – Julie Taymor

=== Best Screenplay – Original ===
The Sixth Sense – M. Night Shyamalan

- American Beauty – Alan Ball
- Being John Malkovich – Charlie Kaufman
- Magnolia – Paul Thomas Anderson
- Three Kings – David O. Russell and John Ridley
- A Walk on the Moon – Pamela Gray

=== Best Sound ===
Sleepy Hollow – Skip Lievsay and Gary Alpers

- Buena Vista Social Club – Elmo Weber and Martin Muller
- The Emperor and the Assassin (Jing ke ci qin wang) – Jing Tao
- Eyes Wide Shut – Paul Conway and Edward Tise
- The Sixth Sense – Allan Byer and Michael Kirchberger
- Star Wars: Episode I – The Phantom Menace – Tom Bellfort, Ben Burtt, Matthew Wood, Gary Rydstrom, Tom Johnson, and Shawn Murphy

=== Best Supporting Actor – Drama ===
Harry J. Lennix – Titus

- Michael Caine – The Cider House Rules
- Tom Cruise – Magnolia
- Doug Hutchison – The Green Mile
- Jude Law – The Talented Mr. Ripley
- Christopher Plummer – The Insider

=== Best Supporting Actor – Musical or Comedy ===
William H. Macy – Happy, Texas

- Dan Hedaya – Dick
- Rhys Ifans – Notting Hill
- Bill Murray – Cradle Will Rock
- Ving Rhames – Bringing Out the Dead
- Alan Rickman – Dogma

=== Best Supporting Actress – Drama ===
Chloë Sevigny – Boys Don't Cry

- Erykah Badu – The Cider House Rules
- Toni Collette – The Sixth Sense
- Jessica Lange – Titus
- Sissy Spacek – The Straight Story
- Charlize Theron – The Cider House Rules

=== Best Supporting Actress – Musical or Comedy ===
Catherine Keener – Being John Malkovich

- Cate Blanchett – An Ideal Husband
- Cameron Diaz – Being John Malkovich
- Samantha Morton – Sweet and Lowdown
- Antonia San Juan – All About My Mother (Todo sobre mi madre)
- Tori Spelling – Trick

=== Best Visual Effects ===
Stuart Little – Jerome Chen and John Dykstra

- The Matrix – Steve Courtley, Brian Cox, and John Gaeta
- The Mummy – John Andrew Berton Jr., Chris Corbould, Mark Freund, Stephen Hamilton, Sony Imageworks
- Sleepy Hollow – Jim Mitchell and Joss Williams
- Star Wars: Episode I – The Phantom Menace – Rob Coleman, John Knoll, Dennis Muren, and Scott Squires
- Titus – Imaginary Forces/Kyle Cooper

=== Outstanding Motion Picture Ensemble ===
Magnolia

== Television winners and nominees ==
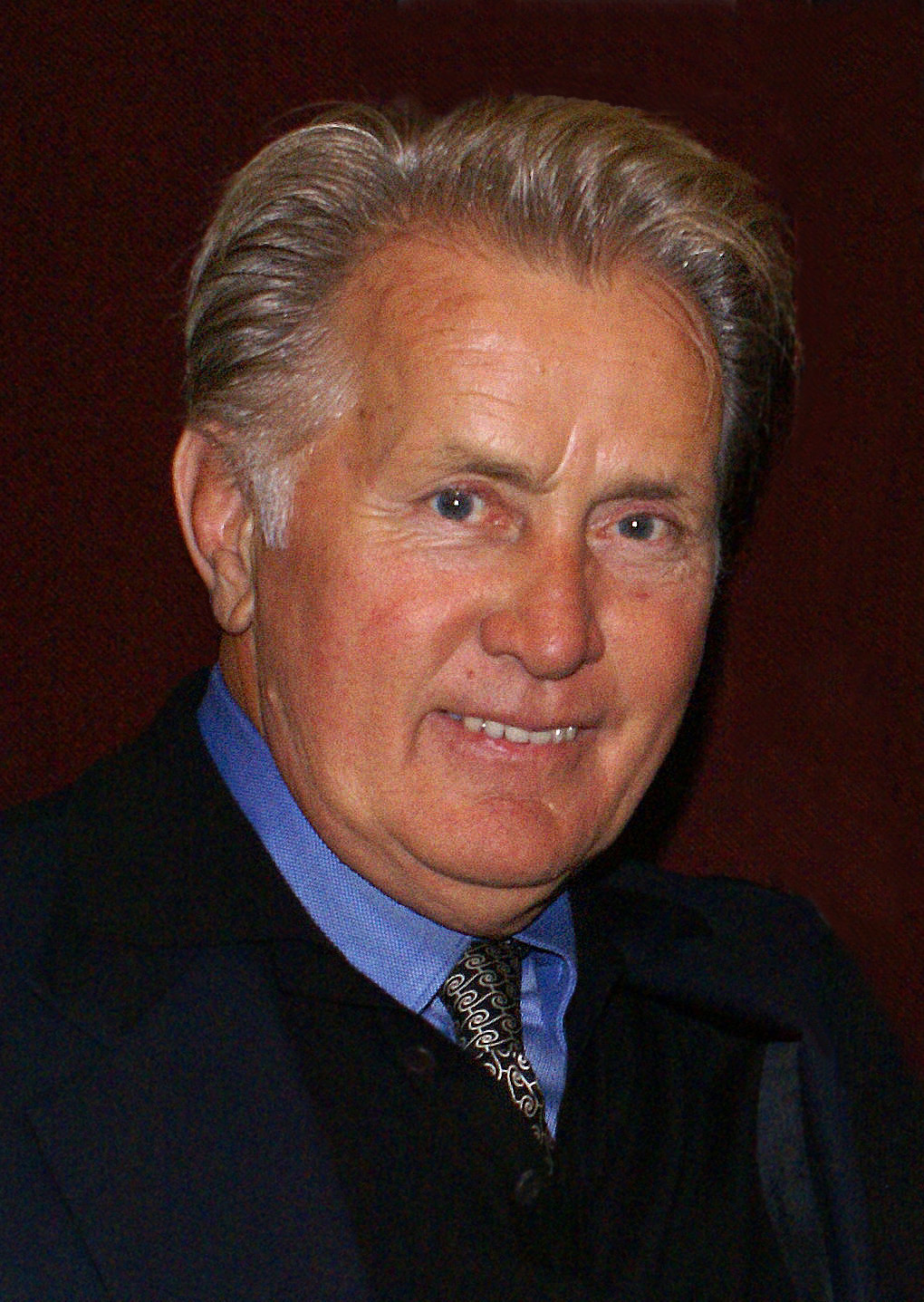
Martin Sheen – Best Actor in a Series, Drama

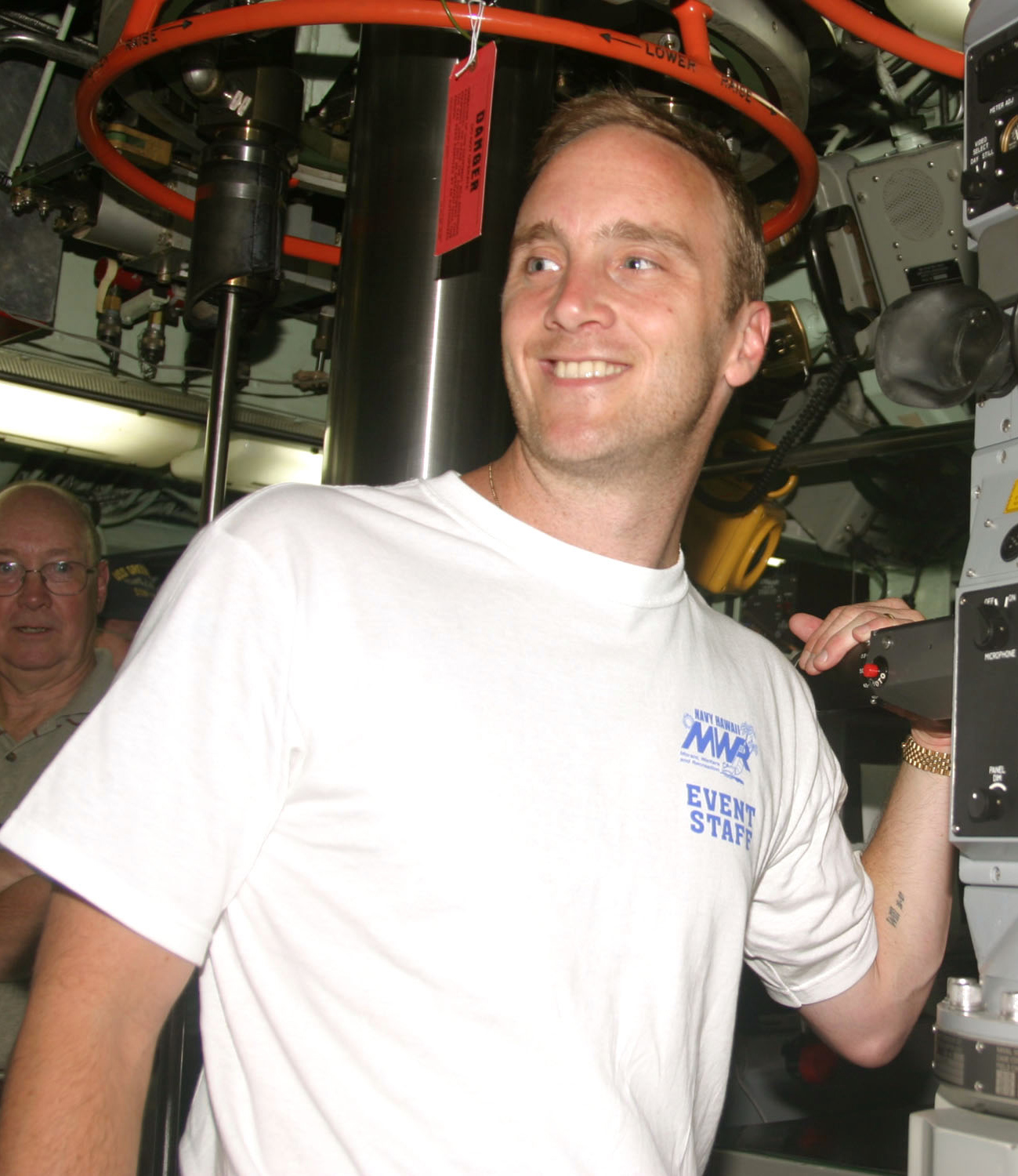
Jay Mohr – Best Actor in a Series, Comedy or Musical

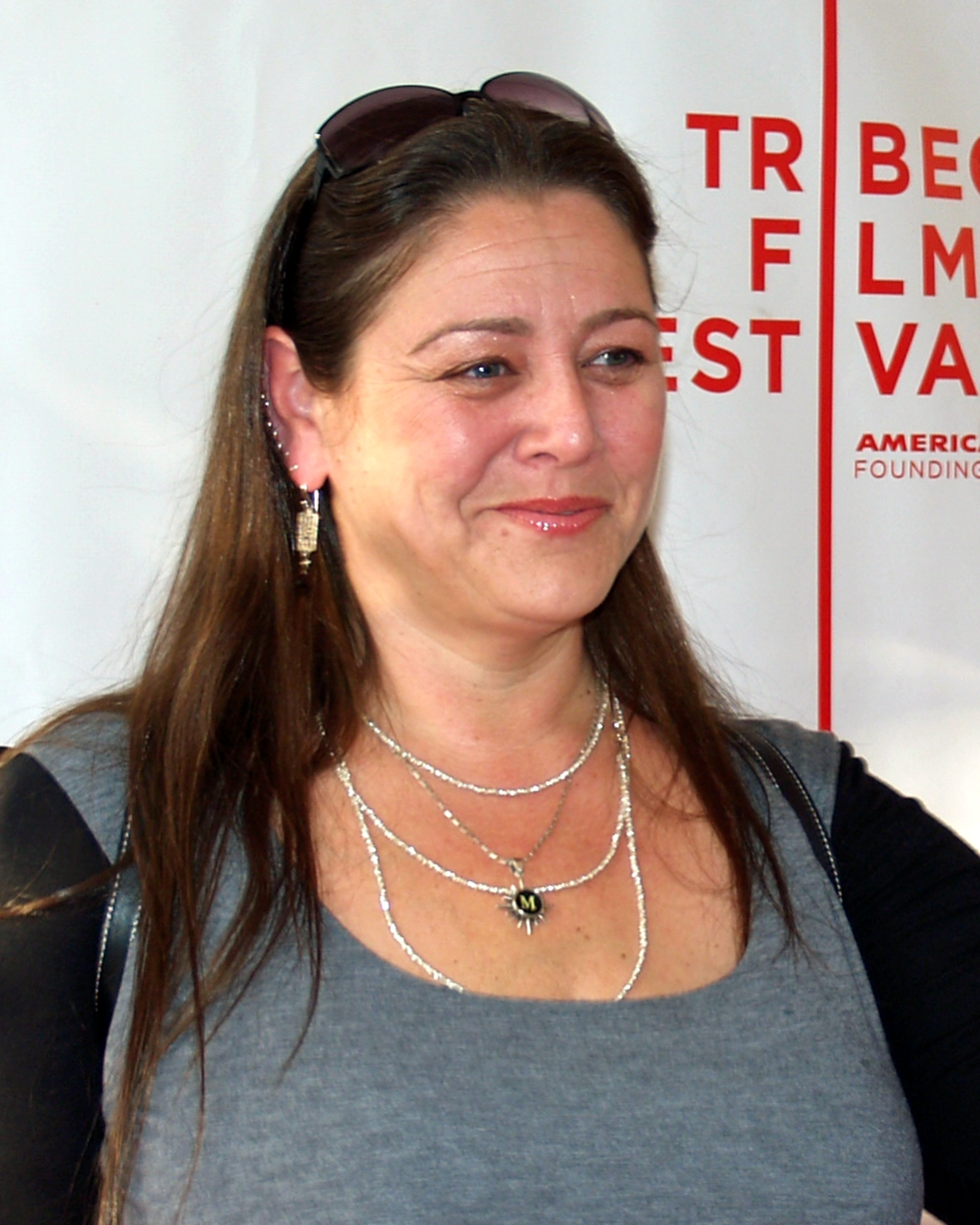
Camryn Manheim – Best Actress in a Series, Drama

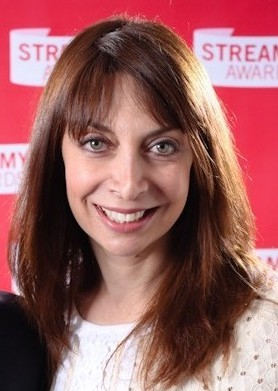
Illeana Douglas – Best Actress in a Series, Comedy or Musical

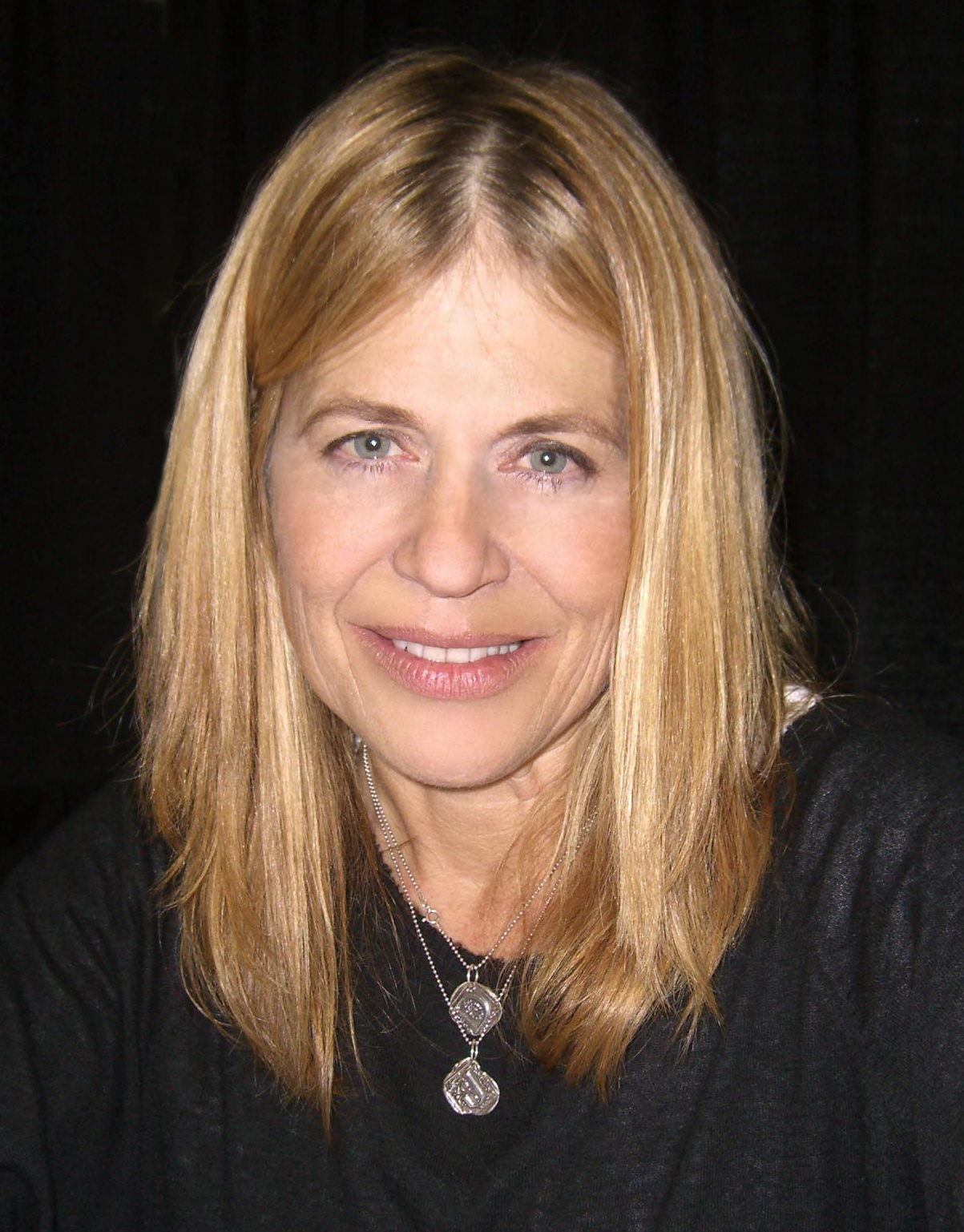
Linda Hamilton – Best Actress in a Miniseries or Television Film

=== Best Actor – Drama Series ===
Martin Sheen – The West Wing

- James Gandolfini – The Sopranos
- Dylan McDermott – The Practice
- Eamonn Walker – Oz
- Sam Waterston – Law & Order

=== Best Actor – Musical or Comedy Series ===
Jay Mohr – Action

- Ted Danson – Becker
- Thomas Gibson – Dharma & Greg
- Eric McCormack – Will & Grace
- David Hyde Pierce – Frasier

=== Best Actor – Miniseries or TV Film ===
William H. Macy – A Slight Case of Murder

- Beau Bridges – P. T. Barnum
- Don Cheadle – A Lesson Before Dying
- Delroy Lindo – Strange Justice
- Brent Spiner – Introducing Dorothy Dandridge

=== Best Actress – Drama Series ===
Camryn Manheim – The Practice

- Lorraine Bracco – The Sopranos
- Edie Falco – The Sopranos
- Mariska Hargitay – Law & Order: Special Victims Unit
- Kelli Williams – The Practice

=== Best Actress – Musical or Comedy Series ===
Illeana Douglas – Action

- Jennifer Aniston – Friends
- Jenna Elfman – Dharma & Greg
- Calista Flockhart – Ally McBeal
- Jane Leeves – Frasier

=== Best Actress – Miniseries or TV Film ===
Linda Hamilton – The Color of Courage

- Kathy Bates – Annie
- Halle Berry – Introducing Dorothy Dandridge
- Leelee Sobieski – Joan of Arc
- Regina Taylor – Strange Justice

=== Best Miniseries ===
Horatio Hornblower: The Even Chance

- Bonanno: A Godfather's Story
- Joan of Arc
- P. T. Barnum
- Purgatory

=== Best Series – Drama ===
The West Wing

- Law & Order
- Oz
- The Practice
- The Sopranos

=== Best Series – Musical or Comedy ===
Action

- Becker
- Dharma & Greg
- Frasier
- Sex and the City

=== Best TV Film ===
Strange Justice

- Introducing Dorothy Dandridge
- A Lesson Before Dying
- RKO 281
- A Slight Case of Murder

== New Media winners and nominees ==
All winners in bold.

=== Best Home Entertainment Product/Kids & Family ===
Pokémon Game

- The King and I Interactive Game
- Toy Story 2 Game
- Disney Princess Fashion Boutique
- Walt Disney World Explorer

=== Best Educational CD-ROM ===
Encarta Encyclopedia

- Classroom Jeopardy
- Bert & Ernie Triva Questions
- You Don't Know Jack
- Super Bowl Trivia

=== CD-ROM Game ===
NBA Pro Basketball

- Doom II: Hell on Earth
- Duke Nukem series
- MechWarrior 3
- Star Wars Jedi Knight: Dark Forces II

=== CD-ROM Industry ===
Interact Media Solution (TIE)

Final Draft

- Quicken 2000
- Final Cut Pro

== Awards breakdown ==
=== Film ===
Winners:

5 / 7 Sleepy Hollow: Best Art Direction / Best Cinematography / Best Costume Design / Best Original Score / Best Sound
2 / 2 Toy Story 2: Best Animated or Mixed Media Film / Best Original Song
2 / 4 Being John Malkovich: Best Film – Musical or Comedy / Best Supporting Actress – Musical or Comedy
2 / 4 Boys Don't Cry: Best Actress – Drama / Best Supporting Actress – Drama
2 / 4 The Sixth Sense: Best Editing / Best Screenplay – Original
2 / 6 The Insider: Best Director / Best Film – Drama
1 / 1 Flawless: Best Actor – Musical or Comedy
1 / 1 The Limey: Best Actor – Drama
1 / 1 Three Seasons (Ba mua): Best Foreign Language Film
1 / 1 Tumbleweeds: Best Actress – Musical or Comedy
1 / 2 Happy, Texas: Best Supporting Actor – Musical or Comedy
1 / 2 Stuart Little: Best Visual Effects
1 / 3 All About My Mother (Todo sobre mi madre): Best Foreign Language Film
1 / 3 Buena Vista Social Club: Best Documentary Film
1 / 4 The Cider House Rules: Best Screenplay – Adapted
1 / 6 Magnolia: Outstanding Motion Picture Ensemble
1 / 6 Titus: Best Supporting Actor – Drama

Losers:

0 / 7 American Beauty
0 / 6 An Ideal Husband, The Talented Mr. Ripley
0 / 5 Snow Falling on Cedars
0 / 4 The Emperor and the Assassin (Jing ke ci qin wang)
0 / 3 Anna and the King, Eyes Wide Shut, Notting Hill, The Red Violin (Le violon rouge)
0 / 2 Dick, Dogma, Election, Felicia's Journey, The Legend of 1900 (La leggenda del pianista sull'oceano), A Map of the World, South Park: Bigger Longer & Uncut, Star Wars: Episode I – The Phantom Menace, The Straight Story, Sweet and Lowdown

=== Television ===
Winners:

3 / 3 Action: Best Actor & Actress – Musical or Comedy Series / Best Series – Musical or Comedy
2 / 2 The West Wing: Best Actor – Drama Series / Best Series – Drama
1 / 2 A Slight Case of Murder: Best Actor – Miniseries or TV Film
1 / 4 The Practice: Best Actress – Drama Series
1 / 1 The Color of Courage: Best Actress – Miniseries or TV Film
1 / 1 Hornblower: The Even Chance: Best Miniseries
1 / 3 Strange Justice: Best TV Film

Losers:

0 / 4 The Sopranos
0 / 3 Dharma & Greg, Frasier, Introducing Dorothy Dandridge
0 / 2 Becker, Joan of Arc, Law & Order, A Lesson Before Dying, Oz, P. T. Barnum
