= National Board of Review Awards 1999 =

Annual US film awards ceremony

71st National Board of Review Awards

December 7, 1999

Best Picture:
American Beauty

The 71st National Board of Review Awards, honoring the best in filmmaking in 1999, were announced on 7 December 1999 and given on 18 January 2000.

== Top 10 films ==
1. American Beauty
2. The Talented Mr. Ripley
3. Magnolia
4. The Insider
5. The Straight Story
6. Cradle Will Rock
7. Boys Don't Cry
8. Being John Malkovich
9. Tumbleweeds
10. Three Kings

== Top Foreign Films ==
1. All About My Mother
2. Run Lola Run
3. East/West
4. Cabaret Balkan
5. The Emperor and the Assassin

== Winners ==
- Best Picture:
  - American Beauty
- Best Foreign Film:
  - All About My Mother
- Best Actor:
  - Russell Crowe - The Insider
- Best Actress:
  - Janet McTeer - Tumbleweeds
- Best Supporting Actor:
  - Philip Seymour Hoffman - Magnolia, The Talented Mr. Ripley
- Best Supporting Actress:
  - Julianne Moore - Magnolia, A Map of the World, An Ideal Husband
- Best Acting by an Ensemble:
  - Magnolia
- Breakthrough Performance - Male:
  - Wes Bentley - American Beauty
- Breakthrough Performance - Female:
  - Hilary Swank - Boys Don't Cry
- Best Director:
  - Anthony Minghella - The Talented Mr. Ripley
- Outstanding Directorial Debut:
  - Kimberly Peirce - Boys Don't Cry
- Best Screenplay:
  - John Irving - The Cider House Rules
  - Arthur Laurents - Career Achievement
- Best Documentary:
  - Buena Vista Social Club
- Best Film made for Cable TV
  - A Lesson Before Dying
- Career Achievement Award:
  - Clint Eastwood
- Billy Wilder Award for Excellence in Directing:
  - John Frankenheimer
- Special Filmmaking Achievement:
  - Tim Robbins - Cradle Will Rock
- William K. Everson Award for Film History:
  - Jeanine Basinger, Silent Stars
- International Freedom Award:
  - Joan Chen - Xiu Xiu: The Sent Down Girl
- Freedom of Expression:
  - Michael Mann - The Insider
- Special Citation:
  - Barry Levinson - Outstanding Cinematic Series, The Baltimore Series
- Special Recognition for Excellence in Filmmaking:
  - A Map of the World
  - A Walk on the Moon
  - Election
  - Go
  - Limbo
  - Lock, Stock and Two Smoking Barrels
  - Man of the Century
  - Stir of Echoes
  - This Is My Father
  - Twin Falls Idaho
