= The Short History of a Prince =

1998 novel by Jane Hamilton

- Author: Jane Hamilton
- Language: English
- Genre: Domestic drama
- Publisher: Random House
- Publication date: March, 1999
- Publication place: USA
- Pages: 368
- ISBN: 978-0-385-47948-6

The Short History of a Prince is a novel by American author Jane Hamilton, published in 1998 by Random House. The book is a domestic drama set in the 1970s and 1990s. It was shortlisted for the 1999 Women's Prize for Fiction.

== Summary ==
The novel follows protagonist Walter McCloud, a gay ballet student in Illinois. The chapters jump back and forth between the 1970s and 1990s. As McCloud grows older, he must face the loss of family members and come to terms with his guilt.

== Reception ==
The Short History of a Prince received mostly positive reviews. Kirkus Reviews described the book as a "lyrical, bighearted novel that won't easily be forgotten" and praised its characters.

The Capital Times offered a mixed review, criticizing the character's "over-polished" and staged" dialogue but praising Hamilton's "vivid and elegant" prose.

== Awards ==
The Short History of a Prince was shortlisted for the Women's Prize for Fiction in 1999.
