= The Book of Ruth (novel) =

1988 novel by Jane Hamilton

- First edition
- Author: Jane Hamilton
- Language: English
- Published: 1988 (Ticknor and Fields)
- Publication place: United States
- Media type: Print (hardback & paperback)
- Pages: 328 pp
- ISBN: 0-89919-744-2
- OCLC: 17919102
- Dewey Decimal: 813/.54 19
- LC Class: PS3558.A4428 B66 1988

The Book of Ruth (1988) is a novel by Jane Hamilton. It won the Hemingway Foundation/PEN Award for best first novel in 1988 and was the Oprah's Book Club selection for November 1996.

== Plot summary ==
An awkward midwest girl, Ruth, is growing up in the small town of Honey Creek, Illinois. Elmer, her father, left the family when she was ten, leaving her mother, May, feeling bitter. May is unhappy with and disappointed in Ruth because she is nothing like her shining brother, Matt, who is a mathematical genius with a scholarship to MIT. Their mother is crushed when Matt moves away to Boston after graduation and is left with Ruth, who takes a job at the local dry cleaner shop.

Ruth's one confidant is her mother's sister, and Aunt, who is worldly and kind, and recognizes that Ruth is a sensitive, observant young woman. Ruth's Aunt continues a relationship with both Ruth and Matt over the years, and provides Ruth with a glimpse into what life could be like as an independent, middle-class woman.

One hot night at the local lake, Ruth meets Ruby Dahl, a local ne'er do well. When Ruby later takes Ruth out on a date, he takes advantage of her naiveté, but Ruth continues to see him and after several dates they decide to get married. Ruby moves in with Ruth and May, and May's oppression and Ruby's stubborn laziness frequently clash. Ruth's life is bleak and somber, and even the birth of her son fails to bring the joys Ruth expected. Seasonally, winter brings on bitter cold, both in the weather and in the emotional standoffs in the Grey-Dahl house. Ruby, who has descended into alcoholism and frequent drug use, begins acting more erratically.

At one point, Ruth takes a short holiday to visit her Aunt. When she comes back, May has made a chicken dinner and keeps making odd comments about how tasty the chicken is because it was slaughtered properly. Ruby is silent during the meal and appears to be high. When Ruth finally asks her mother why she keeps talking about the chicken, her mother explodes with the story that Ruby strangled and hung the chicken in the coup for May to find.

The final standoff occurs one night after dinner, as Ruby and his son want to eat cookies. Because the family is so poor, in the months leading up to Christmas, May saves up to buy flour, butter, eggs, and sugar to make Christmas donation cookies for the church. May bakes the cookies throughout the year and freezes them so that when Christmas comes, she can take them to the church and disguise their obvious poverty with generous cookie donations.

Ruby and the son go to the freezer and plunder the stash in an open revolt against May. May becomes enraged, and Ruby snaps. He grabs a fireplace poker, and begins to beat the family with it. He repeatedly hits May with the fireplace poker, eventually killing her.

Ruby almost ends up killing Ruth too. However, Ruth sputters that they have a son together. The mention of the son seems to snap Ruby out of his homicidal rage, and he stops. Later, Ruby is imprisoned, and Ruth and the son go to live with Ruth's Aunt.

The book ends with Ruth starting to attend college, no longer considered remedial after getting out from under her mother's oppressive ignorance, and she mourns the loss of her simple life and connection with Ruby while also looking forward to a different future with her son.

== Reception ==
Publishers Weekly thought this first novel was too great a challenge for Hamilton's talents. While many of the pieces are there, problems include incomplete characterizations and plotting. Kirkus Reviews provides a similar assessment: "Hamilton's writing is strong and clear, even if her intentions are a trifle obscure... this is an affecting first novel, dark and knowing."
