= Magnolia (film) =

1999 film by Paul Thomas Anderson

- Theatrical release poster
- Directed by: Paul Thomas Anderson
- Written by: Paul Thomas Anderson
- Produced by: JoAnne Sellar; Paul Thomas Anderson
- Starring: Jeremy Blackman; Tom Cruise; Melinda Dillon; Philip Baker Hall; Philip Seymour Hoffman; Ricky Jay; William H. Macy; Alfred Molina; Julianne Moore; John C. Reilly; Jason Robards; Melora Walters
- Cinematography: Robert Elswit
- Edited by: Dylan Tichenor
- Music by: Jon Brion
- Production companies: Ghoulardi Film Company; JoAnne Sellar Productions
- Distributed by: New Line Cinema
- Release date: December 17, 1999 (United States)
- Running time: 188 minutes
- Country: United States
- Language: English
- Budget: $37 million
- Box office: $48.4 million

Magnolia is a 1999 American drama film written, directed and co-produced by Paul Thomas Anderson. It stars an ensemble cast, including Jeremy Blackman, Tom Cruise, Melinda Dillon, Philip Baker Hall, Philip Seymour Hoffman, Ricky Jay, William H. Macy, Alfred Molina, Julianne Moore, John C. Reilly, Jason Robards (in his final film role), and Melora Walters. The film is an epic mosaic of interrelated characters in search of happiness, forgiveness, and meaning in the San Fernando Valley. The script was inspired by the music of Aimee Mann, who contributed several songs to its soundtrack.

The film had a limited theatrical release by New Line Cinema on December 17, 1999, before expanding wide on January 7, 2000. Magnolia received acclaim from critics. It grossed $48.4 million against a $37 million budget. Among its accolades, the film earned three nominations at the 72nd Academy Awards, where Cruise was nominated for Best Supporting Actor, and two at the 57th Golden Globes, where Cruise won Best Supporting Actor – Motion Picture. It was ranked third in the National Board of Review's top ten films of the year, and won three National Board of Review Awards, including Best Supporting Actor for Hoffman (Note: Also for The Talented Mr. Ripley.) and Best Supporting Actress for Moore, (Note: Also for A Map of the World, Cookie's Fortune, and An Ideal Husband.) while its soundtrack and score earned a cumulative three nominations at the 43rd Annual Grammy Awards.

== Plot ==
Outline of the various characters in Magnolia and their relationships

Los Angeles police officer Jim Kurring investigates a disturbance at a woman's apartment, finding a body in a closet. Dixon, a neighborhood boy, unsuccessfully tries to tell him who committed the murder. Jim goes to the apartment of Claudia Wilson, whose neighbors called the police after she argued with her estranged father, Jimmy Gator, and blasted music while snorting cocaine. Seemingly oblivious, Jim asks her on a date.

Jimmy hosts a quiz show called What Do Kids Know?, where children and adults compete against each other, and is dying of cancer. The newest child prodigy on the show, Stanley Spector, is hounded by his father Rick for the prize money and demeaned by the adults, who prevent him from using the bathroom during a commercial break. When the show resumes, Stanley wets himself. As the show continues, a drunken Jimmy sickens, ordering the show to go on after he collapses. After Rick berates him, Stanley runs away.

Former What Do Kids Know? champion Donnie Smith, whose parents took all his prize money, has been fired from his job and is in love with a male bartender with braces. Donnie wants to get braces himself, thinking the bartender will love him back. He hatches a plan to steal the money from his former boss for the surgery.

The show's former producer, Earl Partridge, is also dying of cancer, only faster than Jimmy. Earl's trophy wife, Linda, collects his prescriptions while he is cared for by a nurse, Phil Parma. Earl asks Phil to find his estranged son, Frank Mackey, a coarse and blatantly misogynistic but charismatic motivational speaker and pickup artist. Frank is interviewed by a journalist who knows Frank took care of his dying mother after Earl left. Frank storms out of the interview, after which Phil tries to contact him.

Linda goes to see Earl's lawyer, hoping to change his will. She married Earl for his money, but now genuinely loves him and does not want it. The lawyer suggests she renounce the will and decline the money, which would go to Frank. Linda rejects his advice and berates Phil for seeking out Frank, but later apologizes. She drives to a vacant parking lot and attempts suicide by drug overdose. Dixon finds Linda near death in the car, takes the money from her purse, and calls an ambulance.

Jim loses his gun while trying to catch a suspect. When he meets Claudia, they promise to be honest with each other, so he confesses his ineptitude as a cop and admits he has not been on a date since he divorced three years earlier. Claudia says he will hate her because of her problems, but Jim assures her that her past does not matter. They kiss, but she leaves him.

Jimmy goes home to his wife, Rose, and confesses that he cheated on her. She asks why Claudia does not talk to him, and Jimmy admits that Claudia believes he molested her. Rose demands to know if it is true, but Jimmy says he cannot remember. Disgusted, Rose leaves him and he too decides to commit suicide. Elsewhere, Donnie steals the money, but when he decides to return it due to his conscience, he cannot get back inside the office. While Donnie climbs a utility pole to the roof to try to return the money, Jim sees him and feels compelled to investigate.

Suddenly, frogs begin falling from the sky. One of them hits Donnie, he falls from the pole, smashes his teeth and is pulled to safety by Jim. Linda's ambulance crashes near the hospital. As Jimmy is about to shoot himself, frogs fall through his skylight, causing him to shoot the television and cause a house fire. Rose crashes her car near Claudia's apartment but makes it inside and reconciles with her daughter. Earl is awakened and sees Frank beside him before dying.

The next day, Jim's lost gun falls from the sky, after which he helps Donnie return the money. Frank goes to the hospital to be with Linda, who will recover. Stanley tells Rick that he needs to be nicer to him, but Rick just tells him to go to bed. Jim goes to see Claudia, telling her he wants to make things work between them. As Jim is explaining this, Claudia glances into the camera and smiles.

== Cast ==
- Tom Cruise as Frank T.J. Mackey
- Jason Robards as Earl Partridge
- Julianne Moore as Linda Partridge
- Philip Seymour Hoffman as Phil Parma
- Emmanuel Johnson as Dixon
- Melora Walters as Claudia Wilson Gator
- Philip Baker Hall as Jimmy Gator
- Melinda Dillon as Rose Gator
- John C. Reilly as Jim Kurring
- William H. Macy as Donnie Smith
- Jeremy Blackman as Stanley Spector
- Michael Bowen as Rick Spector
- April Grace as Gwenovier
- Luis Guzmán as Luis
- Ricky Jay as Burt Ramsey (also provided narration)
- Alfred Molina as Solomon Solomon
- Michael Murphy as Alan Kligman, Esq.
- Henry Gibson as Thurston Howell
- Felicity Huffman as Cynthia
- Don McManus as Dr. Landon
- Eileen Ryan as Mary
- Danny Wells as Dick Jennings

Also starring are Thomas Jane as the young Jimmy Gator; Cleo King as Marcie; Orlando Jones as Worm; Clark Gregg and Robert Downey Sr. as employees of WDKK; Patton Oswalt as Delmer Darion; Miriam Margolyes as Faye Barringer; and Pat Healy as both Sir Edmund William Godfrey and the young pharmacist. Paul F. Tompkins and Mary Lynn Rajskub provide voice cameos as Chad and Janet, respectively.

== Production ==
=== Development ===
Paul Thomas Anderson started to get ideas for Magnolia during the long editing period of Boogie Nights (1997). As he got closer to finishing the film, he started writing down material for his new project. After the critical and financial success of Boogie Nights, New Line Cinema, who backed that film, told Anderson that he could do whatever he wanted and Anderson realized that, "I was in a position I will never ever be in again." Michael De Luca, then head of production at New Line Cinema, made the deal for Magnolia, granting Anderson final cut without hearing an idea for the film. Originally, Anderson had wanted to make a film that was "intimate and small-scale," something that he could shoot in 30 days. He had the title of "Magnolia" in his head before he wrote the script.

As he started writing, the script "kept blossoming" and he realized that there were many actors he wanted to write for and then decided to put "an epic spin on topics that don't necessarily get the epic treatment". He wanted to "make the epic, the all-time great San Fernando Valley movie". Anderson started with lists of images, words and ideas that "start resolving themselves into sequences and shots and dialogue," actors, and music. The first image he had for the film was the smiling face of actress Melora Walters. The next image that came to him was of Philip Baker Hall as her father. Anderson imagined Hall walking up the steps of Walters' apartment and having an intense confrontation with her. Anderson also did research on the magnolia tree and discovered a concept that eating the tree's bark helped cure cancer.

Before Anderson became a filmmaker, he worked as an assistant for a television game show, Quiz Kid Challenge, an experience he incorporated into the script for Magnolia. He also claimed in interviews that the film is structured somewhat like "A Day in the Life" by The Beatles, and "it kind of builds up, note by note, then drops or recedes, then builds again".

=== Screenplay ===
By the time he started writing the script, Anderson was listening to the music of his friend Aimee Mann. He used her first two solo albums and demo tracks for her upcoming third album, Bachelor No. 2 or, the Last Remains of the Dodo, as a basis and inspiration; he said he "sat down to write an adaptation of Aimee Mann songs". In particular, Mann's song "Deathly" inspired the character of Claudia. Claudia uses part of the lyric as dialogue in the film ("Now that I've met you / Would you object to / Never seeing each other again"). The film also features a sequence in which the characters sing along to Mann's song "Wise Up".

The character of Jim Kurring originated in 1998, when John C. Reilly grew a moustache out of interest and started putting together an unintelligent cop character. He and Anderson did a few parodies of COPS with Anderson chasing Reilly around the streets with a video camera. Jennifer Jason Leigh made an appearance in one of these videos. Some of Kurring's dialogue came from these sessions. This time around, Reilly wanted to do something different and told Anderson that he was "always cast as these heavies or these semi-retarded child men. Can't you give me something I can relate to, like falling in love with a girl?" Anderson also wanted to make Reilly a romantic lead because it was something different that the actor had not done before.

For Philip Seymour Hoffman, Anderson wanted him to play a "really simple, uncomplicated, caring character". Hoffman described his character as someone who "really takes pride in the fact that every day he's dealing with life and death circumstances". With Julianne Moore in mind, Anderson wrote a role for her to play a crazed character using many pharmaceuticals. According to Moore, "Linda doesn't know who she is or what she's feeling and can only try to explain it in the most vulgar terms possible". Anderson said that Linda's story was inspired by his own father's wife. For William H. Macy, Anderson felt that Macy was scared of big, emotional parts and wrote "a big tearful, emotional part" for him.

While convincing Philip Baker Hall to do the film by explaining the significance of the rain of frogs, Hall told him a story about when he was in the mountains of Italy and got caught in bad weather—a mix of rain, snow and tiny frogs. Hall had to pull off the road until the storm passed. According to an interview, Hall said that he based the character of Jimmy Gator on real-life television personalities such as Bob Barker and Arthur Godfrey. The rain of frogs was inspired by the works of Charles Fort, and Anderson claims that he was unaware that it was also a reference in The Bible when he first wrote the sequence. At the time Anderson came across the notion of a rain of frogs, he was "going through a weird, personal time", and he started to understand "why people turn to religion in times of trouble, and maybe my form of finding religion was reading about rains of frogs and realizing that makes sense to me somehow".

=== Casting ===
Tom Cruise was a fan of Anderson's previous film, Boogie Nights, and contacted Anderson while he was working on Stanley Kubrick's Eyes Wide Shut (1999). Anderson met with Cruise on the set of Kubrick's film and Cruise told him to keep him in mind for his next film. After Anderson finished the script, he sent Cruise a copy and the next day, Cruise called him. Cruise was interested but nervous about the role. Anderson met with Cruise along with De Luca who helped convince Cruise to do the film. Frank T.J. Mackey, the character that Cruise would play in the film, was based in part on an audio-recording done in an engineering class taught by a friend that was given to Anderson. It consisted of two men, "talking all this trash" about women and quoting a man named Ross Jeffries, who was teaching a new version of the Eric Weber course, "How to Pick Up Women," but utilizing hypnotism and subliminal language techniques. Anderson transcribed the tape and did a reading with Reilly and Chris Penn. Anderson then incorporated this dialogue and his research on Jeffries and other self-help gurus into Mackey and his sex seminar. Anderson felt that Cruise was drawn to the role because he had just finished making Eyes Wide Shut, playing a repressed character, and was able to then play a character that was "outlandish and bigger-than-life". Anderson filmed a full-length infomercial with Cruise and even bought time on late night television to play it on.

Anderson wrote the role of Earl Partridge for Jason Robards, but Robards could not do it due to a staph infection. After George C. Scott declined the role, Robards managed to take it. He said of his character, "It was sort of prophetic that I be asked to play a guy going out in life. It was just so right for me to do this and bring what I know to it". According to Hall, much of the material with Partridge was based on Anderson watching his father die of cancer. Anderson wanted Burt Reynolds to star in the film after working on Boogie Nights, but Reynolds declined it.

=== Filming ===
Filming began on January 12, 1999, and was initially scheduled to be 79 days, but ended up lasting until June 24, 1999, making a total of 90 filming days plus 10 days of second unit filming.

Anderson is known for the use of long takes in his films that move along considerable distances with complex camera movements and transitions with actors and the sets. Of the long takes in Magnolia, the most notable may be the 2 minutes 15 seconds where character Stanley Spector arrives at the studio for a taping of What Do Kids Know?, the camera seamlessly moving through multiple rooms and hallways and transitioning to follow different characters throughout the single take.

For the look of the film, the production designers analyzed films with close, tight and warm color palettes and applied it to Magnolia. They also wanted to evoke the colors of the magnolia flower: greens, browns and off-whites. For the section of the prologue that is set in 1911, Anderson used a hand-cranked Pathé camera that would have been used at the time. Some of the actors were nervous about their scene singing the lyrics to Mann's "Wise Up", so Anderson asked Moore to go first to help set the pace which everyone else followed.

Anderson and New Line Cinema reportedly had intense arguments about how to market Magnolia. He felt that the studio did not do a decent enough job on Boogie Nights and did not like the studio's poster or trailer for Magnolia. Anderson ended up designing his own poster, cut together a trailer himself, wrote the liner notes for the soundtrack album, and pushed to avoid hyping Cruise's presence in the film in favor of the ensemble cast. Even though Anderson ultimately got his way, he realized that he had to "learn to fight without being a jerk. I was a bit of a baby. At the first moment of conflict, I behaved in a slightly adolescent knee-jerk way. I just screamed."

== Music and soundtracks ==
Anderson met Aimee Mann in 1996 when he asked her husband, Michael Penn, to write the score and songs for his film, Hard Eight. Mann had songs on soundtracks before but never "in such an integral way", she said in an interview. She gave Anderson rough mixes of songs and found that they both wrote about the same kinds of characters. He encouraged her to write songs for the film by sending her a copy of the script. Anderson said that "Simon and Garfunkel is to The Graduate as Aimee Mann is to Magnolia".

Two songs were written expressly for the film: "You Do", which was based on a character later cut from the film, and "Save Me", which closes the film; the latter was nominated in the 2000 Academy Awards and Golden Globes and in the 2001 Grammys. Most of the remaining seven Mann songs were demos and works in progress; "Wise Up", which is at the center of a sequence in which all of the characters sing the song, was originally written for the 1996 film Jerry Maguire. At the time, Mann's record label had refused to release her songs on an album. The song that plays at the opening of the film is Mann's cover of "One" by Harry Nilsson. Mann's track "Momentum" is used as the loud playing music in Claudia's apartment scene when Officer Jim arrives and was also featured in the trailer for the film.

The soundtrack album, released in December 1999 on Reprise Records, features the Mann songs, as well as a section of Jon Brion's score and tracks by Supertramp and Gabrielle that were used in the film. Reprise released a full score album in March 2000.

== Reception ==
=== Box office ===
Magnolia initially opened in a limited release on December 17, 1999, in seven theaters grossing $193,604. The film was given a wide release on January 7, 2000, in 1,034 theaters grossing $5.7 million on its opening weekend. It has grossed $22.5 million in the United States and Canada, and $26.0 million in other territories, for a worldwide total of $48.5 million, against a budget of $37 million.

=== Critical response ===
On the review aggregator website Rotten Tomatoes, 82% of 219 critics' reviews are positive. The website's consensus reads: “An eruption of feeling that's as overwhelming as it is overwrought, Paul Thomas Anderson's Magnolia reaches a fevered crescendo and sustains it thanks to its fearlessly committed ensemble.” Metacritic, which uses a weighted average, assigned the film a score of 78 out of 100, based on 34 critics, indicating "generally favorable" reviews. Audiences polled by CinemaScore gave the film an average grade of "C−" on an A+ to F scale.

USA Today gave the film three and a half stars out of four and called it "the most imperfect of the year's best movies". Roger Ebert from the Chicago Sun-Times awarded the film four stars out of four, praising it in both of his reviews from 2000 and 2008, and as his second favorite film of 1999, behind Being John Malkovich. He said in the first review, "Magnolia is the kind of film I instinctively respond to. Leave logic at the door. Do not expect subdued taste and restraint, but instead a kind of operatic ecstasy". After rewatching it in 2008, he added the film to his 'Great Movies' list. Entertainment Weekly gave the film a "B+" rating, praising Cruise's performance: "It's with Cruise as Frank T.J. Mackey, a slick televangelist of penis power, that the filmmaker scores his biggest success, as the actor exorcises the uptight fastidiousness of Eyes Wide Shut ... Like John Travolta in Pulp Fiction, this cautiously packaged movie star is liberated by risky business". The Independent said that the film was "limitless. And yet some things do feel incomplete, brushed-upon, tangential. Magnolia does not have the last word on anything. But is superb". Kenneth Turan, in his review for the Los Angeles Times, praised Tom Cruise's performance: "Mackey gives Cruise the chance to cut loose by doing amusing riffs on his charismatic superstar image. It's great fun, expertly written and performed, and all the more enjoyable because the self-parody element is unexpected". In his review for The New York Observer, Andrew Sarris wrote, "In the case of Magnolia, I think Mr. Anderson has taken us to the water's edge without plunging in. I admire his ambition and his very eloquent camera movements, but if I may garble something Lenin once said one last time, 'You can't make an omelet without breaking some eggs'."

In her review for The New York Times, Janet Maslin wrote, "But when that group sing-along arrives, Magnolia begins to self-destruct spectacularly. It's astonishing to see a film begin this brilliantly only to torpedo itself in its final hour," but went on to say that the film "was saved from its worst, most reductive ideas by the intimacy of the performances and the deeply felt distress signals given off by the cast". Philip French, in his review for The Observer, wrote, "But is the joyless universe he (Anderson) presents any more convincing than the Pollyanna optimism of traditional sitcoms? These lives are somehow too stunted and pathetic to achieve the level of tragedy". The Time critic Richard Schickel wrote: "The result is a hard-striving, convoluted movie, which never quite becomes the smoothly reciprocating engine Anderson (who did Boogie Nights) would like it to be."

In an interview, Ingmar Bergman mentioned Magnolia as an example of the "strength of American cinema". Roger Ebert included the work in his "Great Movies" list in November 2008, saying, "As an act of filmmaking, it draws us in and doesn't let go." Total Film magazine placed it at number 4 in their list of 50 Best Movies in Total Film's lifetime. In 2008, it was named the 89th greatest movie of all time by Empire magazine in its issue of The 500 Greatest Movies of All Time. It received eight votes – five from critics and three from directors – in the British Film Institute's 2012 Sight & Sound polls.

Following the film's release, Anderson said: "I really feel ... That Magnolia is, for better or worse, the best movie I'll ever make." Later he came to consider it overlong; when asked in an interview what he would tell himself to do if he could go back to when he shot the film, his response was "Chill The Fuck Out and Cut Twenty Minutes."

=== Accolades ===
Award	Category	Nominee(s)	Result	Ref.
Academy Awards	Best Supporting Actor	Tom Cruise	Nominated	
Academy Awards	Best Screenplay – Written Directly for the Screen	Paul Thomas Anderson	Nominated	
Academy Awards	Best Original Song	"Save Me"; Music and Lyrics by Aimee Mann	Nominated	
Berlin International Film Festival	Golden Bear	Paul Thomas Anderson	Won	
Berlin International Film Festival	Reader Jury of the "Berliner Morgenpost"	Paul Thomas Anderson	Won	
Blockbuster Entertainment Awards	Favorite Supporting Actor – Drama	Tom Cruise	Won	
Blockbuster Entertainment Awards	Favorite Supporting Actress – Drama	Julianne Moore	Nominated	
Bodil Awards	Best American Film		Nominated	
Chicago Film Critics Association Awards	Best Film		Nominated	
Chicago Film Critics Association Awards	Best Director	Paul Thomas Anderson	Nominated	
Chicago Film Critics Association Awards	Best Screenplay	Paul Thomas Anderson	Nominated	
Chicago Film Critics Association Awards	Best Supporting Actor	Tom Cruise	Won	
Chlotrudis Awards	Best Movie		Nominated	
Chlotrudis Awards	Best Director	Paul Thomas Anderson	Nominated	
Chlotrudis Awards	Best Supporting Actor	Philip Seymour Hoffman (also for The Talented Mr. Ripley)	Won	
Chlotrudis Awards	Best Cinematography	Robert Elswit	Nominated	
Critics' Choice Awards	Best Picture		Nominated	
Dallas–Fort Worth Film Critics Association Awards	Best Picture		Nominated	
Empire Awards	Best Film		Nominated	
Empire Awards	Best Director	Paul Thomas Anderson	Nominated	
Florida Film Critics Circle Awards	Best Film		Won	
Florida Film Critics Circle Awards	Best Ensemble		Won	
Golden Globe Awards	Best Supporting Actor – Motion Picture	Tom Cruise	Won	
Golden Globe Awards	Best Original Song – Motion Picture	"Save Me"; Music and Lyrics by Aimee Mann	Nominated	
Grammy Awards	Best Compilation Soundtrack Album for a Motion Picture, Television or Other Visual Media	Magnolia: Music from the Motion Picture – Aimee Mann	Nominated	
Grammy Awards	Best Score Soundtrack Album for a Motion Picture, Television or Other Visual Media	Magnolia – Jon Brion	Nominated	
Grammy Awards	Best Song Written for a Motion Picture, Television or Other Visual Media	"Save Me" – Aimee Mann	Nominated	
Grand Prix Cinema Brazil	Best Foreign Language Film	Paul Thomas Anderson	Nominated	
Guldbagge Awards	Best Foreign Film	Paul Thomas Anderson	Won	
Las Vegas Film Critics Society Awards	Best Picture		Nominated	
Las Vegas Film Critics Society Awards	Best Original Song	"Save Me"; Music and Lyrics by Aimee Mann	Nominated	
Las Vegas Film Critics Society Awards	Best DVD		Nominated	
London Film Critics Circle Awards	Screenwriter of the Year	Paul Thomas Anderson	Nominated	
MTV Video Music Awards	Best Video from a Film	Aimee Mann – "Save Me"	Nominated	
Nastro d'Argento	Best Foreign Director	Paul Thomas Anderson	Won	
Nastro d'Argento	Best Male Dubbing	Roberto Chevalier (for dubbing Tom Cruise)	Nominated	
National Board of Review Awards	Top Ten Films		3rd Place	
National Board of Review Awards	Best Supporting Actor	Philip Seymour Hoffman (also for The Talented Mr. Ripley)	Won	
National Board of Review Awards	Best Supporting Actress	Julianne Moore (also for A Map of the World, Cookie's Fortune, and An Ideal Husband)	Won	
National Board of Review Awards	Best Acting by an Ensemble		Won	
National Society of Film Critics Awards	Best Supporting Actor	Philip Seymour Hoffman (also for The Talented Mr. Ripley)	2nd Place	
National Society of Film Critics Awards	Best Supporting Actress	Julianne Moore (also for A Map of the World and An Ideal Husband)	2nd Place	
Online Film & Television Association Awards	Best Picture	JoAnne Sellar and Paul Thomas Anderson	Nominated	
Online Film & Television Association Awards	Best Director	Paul Thomas Anderson	Nominated	
Online Film & Television Association Awards	Best Supporting Actor	Tom Cruise	Won	
Online Film & Television Association Awards	Best Supporting Actress	Julianne Moore	Won	
Online Film & Television Association Awards	Best Youth Performance	Jeremy Blackman	Nominated	
Online Film & Television Association Awards	Best Original Screenplay	Paul Thomas Anderson	Nominated	
Online Film & Television Association Awards	Best Original Song	"Save Me"; Music and Lyrics by Aimee Mann	Nominated	
Online Film & Television Association Awards	Best Adapted Song	"One"; Music and Lyrics by Harry Nilsson	Won	
Online Film & Television Association Awards	Best Casting	Cassandra Kulukundis	Nominated	
Online Film & Television Association Awards	Best Ensemble		Won	
Online Film & Television Association Awards	Best Cinematic Moment	"Frogs"	Nominated	
Online Film Critics Society Awards (1999)	Top 10 Films		6th Place	
Online Film Critics Society Awards (1999)	Best Supporting Actress	Julianne Moore	Nominated	
Online Film Critics Society Awards (1999)	Best Screenplay	Paul Thomas Anderson	Nominated	
Online Film Critics Society Awards (1999)	Best Ensemble		Nominated	
Online Film Critics Society Awards (2000)	Best DVD		Nominated	
Robert Awards	Best American Film	Paul Thomas Anderson	Nominated	
San Sebastián International Film Festival	Film of the Year	Paul Thomas Anderson	Won	
Satellite Awards	Best Motion Picture – Drama		Nominated	
Satellite Awards	Best Director	Paul Thomas Anderson	Nominated	
Satellite Awards	Best Supporting Actor in a Motion Picture – Drama	Tom Cruise	Nominated	
Satellite Awards	Best Screenplay – Original	Paul Thomas Anderson	Nominated	
Satellite Awards	Best Original Song	"Save Me"; Music and Lyrics by Aimee Mann	Nominated	
Satellite Awards	Outstanding Motion Picture Ensemble		Won	
Screen Actors Guild Awards	Outstanding Performance by a Cast in a Motion Picture	Jeremy Blackman, Tom Cruise, Melinda Dillon, April Grace, Luis Guzmán, Philip Baker Hall, Philip Seymour Hoffman, Ricky Jay, William H. Macy, Alfred Molina, Julianne Moore, Michael Murphy, John C. Reilly, Jason Robards, and Melora Walters	Nominated	
Screen Actors Guild Awards	Outstanding Performance by a Male Actor in a Supporting Role	Tom Cruise	Nominated	
Screen Actors Guild Awards	Outstanding Performance by a Female Actor in a Supporting Role	Julianne Moore	Nominated	
Stinkers Bad Movie Awards	Worst On-Screen Hairstyle (Male)	Tom Cruise	Nominated	
Stinkers Bad Movie Awards	Most Intrusive Musical Score		Nominated	
Toronto Film Critics Association Awards	Best Film		Won	
Toronto Film Critics Association Awards	Best Director	Paul Thomas Anderson	Won	
Toronto Film Critics Association Awards	Best Screenplay	Paul Thomas Anderson	Won (Note: Tied with Charlie Kaufman for Being John Malkovich.)	
Turkish Film Critics Association Awards	Best Foreign Film		7th Place	
Village Voice Film Poll	Best Film		8th Place	
Writers Guild of America Awards	Best Screenplay – Written Directly for the Screen	Paul Thomas Anderson	Nominated	
Young Artist Awards	Best Performance in a Feature Film – Leading Young Actor	Jeremy Blackman	Nominated	

- In 2004, the American Film Institute nominated the song "Save Me" from this film for AFI's 100 Years ... 100 Songs.

== Themes ==
Essays have been written on the themes in Magnolia, such as regret; loneliness; the cost of failed relationships as a result of parents, particularly fathers, who have failed their children; and cruelty to children and its lasting effect (as demonstrated by the sexual assault perpetrated on Claudia by Jimmy).

=== Biblical references ===
At the end of the film, frogs rain from the sky. Throughout the film, there are references to the Book of Exodus 8:2 "And if thou refuse to let them go, behold, I will smite all thy borders with frogs."

The film has an underlying theme of unexplained events, taken from the 1920s and 1930s works of Charles Fort. Fortean author Loren Coleman's 2001 book "Mysterious America: The Revised Edition" includes a chapter entitled "The Teleporting Animals and Magnolia", addressing the film. The chapter discusses how one of Fort's books is visible on the table in the library and the film's end credit thanking Charles Fort.

The only character who seems to be unsurprised by the falling frogs is Stanley. He calmly observes the event, saying, "This happens. This is something that happens." This has led to the speculation that Stanley is a prophet, allegorically akin to Moses, and that the "slavery" to which the film alludes is the exploitation of children by adults. These "father issues" persist throughout the film, as seen in the abuse and neglect of Claudia, Frank, Donnie, Stanley, and Dixon.

== Home media ==
The DVD release includes a lengthy behind-the-scenes documentary, That Moment.

== See also ==
- Fragile masculinity – Anxiety due to a feeling of inadequate masculinity
- Synchronicity – Jungian concept of the meaningfulness of acausal coincidences
- Transgenerational trauma – Psychological trauma
