= Sleepy Hollow (soundtrack) =

Sleepy Hollow (Music from the Motion Picture)

Film score by Danny Elfman
- Released: November 16, 1999
- Recorded: 1999
- Venues: London; New York City
- Studios: Abbey Road Studios; AIR Studios; Whitfield Street Recording Studios; Watford Colosseum; Manhattan Center
- Genre: Film score
- Length: 67:50
- Label: Hollywood
- Producer: Danny Elfman

Danny Elfman chronology
Anywhere but Here (1999)	Sleepy Hollow (1999)	The Family Man (2000)

Sleepy Hollow (Music from the Motion Picture) is the soundtrack album to the 1999 film Sleepy Hollow directed by Tim Burton, starring Johnny Depp and Christina Ricci. The film featured musical score composed by Danny Elfman and was released through Hollywood Records on November 16, 1999.

== Development ==
Tim Burton renewed his collaboration with his longtime collaborator Danny Elfman for the score of Sleepy Hollow. As with all of his films, Elfman involved in the middle of the production watching the filming process and also few clips of the footage shown by the editor Chris Lebenzon, also helped in developing the musical and thematic ideas in his mind. While the film in particular being a monster film, which also included romantic and fantasy elements integral to the storyline, Elfman used brass to give weightage to the monster.

Elfman exercised on both solo vocals and choral elements thematically, including a theme with a boy's solo voice that was intended to be used for the flashbacks of the young Ichabod but instead incorporated for the Horseman which worked well into the film. Elfman admitted that "it makes no sense that the same theme that is playing over Ichabod's flashbacks as a child is also playing over the Horseman". He had also written two other themes for the Horseman character; however, the Ichabod theme was randomly popped up which became the main theme of the music though he did not initially intend it to be that way.

The Ichabod theme also served as the romantic theme, which happened in A Gift track and is also played in several other scenes, especially in the romantic moments. Elfman also worked on the dissonant horror and suspense-filled music, which turned to be tonal and dynamic in consistency. Having likened to dissonant music, he considered the most fun he had was for how the Horseman breaks into the house of the family and kills them were the mother's head rolls up and her eye looking through the floorboards.

Burton was much more involved with the score than most of his other films. Since both of them were in New York City during production, Burton visited Elfman's studio every day, becoming more involved and opinionated. He considered the score to be very difficult, as each cue overlapped every other cue, with only 10 minutes of the film not having score. Each change affected the musical process ranging from 10-second as it flowed seamlessly from one cue to other, which led to him backing up and rewriting the whole ending and end in a different key comparing to a domino-like process. Elfman used MIDI to easily utilize the scoring process that made it much easier.

== Reception ==
Christian Clemmensen of Filmtracks wrote "Despite its immense depth of rendering, the work's less than spectacular personality and overbearing darkness keep it from being the kind of score worth cutting off someone's head in order to obtain." Jonathan Broxton of Movie Music UK wrote "It is pointless to continue the arguments about Danny Elfman “recapturing his glory days”, because it's not going to happen in the way the fan-boys would like. As all composers do, Elfman has developed and refined his style as the years have passed, and I am beginning to come around to the fact that, although his works are not as gleefully enjoyable as they once were, they are “better” scores in their make-up. I would not be overstating things if I were to say that this is by far Danny Elfman's best score since Sommersby in 1993, and it's well within the top five or six of his career achievements to date."

Thomas Glorieux of Maintitles wrote "Overall, Sleepy Hollow is Elfman doing his thing. I have no doubt that many will see this as the next best thing, but I also know that others will have a hard time during several moments. This is no tragedy since the score is no easy one to begin with. However you have to admire the sheer energy, the pure gothic stamp and the amazing dark mood that makes Sleepy Hollow what it is today, namely an Elfman classic for dark lovers of the era. Chop off 15 minutes and it could have given us a more coherent listen, because quite frankly Sleepy Hollow remains a score that needs (for a non too grand Elfman fan) a lot of repeated tries and patience. Just don't lose your head over its overbearing ruckus."

Todd McCarthy of Variety wrote "Danny Elfman's score adds turbulent excitement with the occasional touch of bombast." Mia Pidlaoan of Screen Rant wrote "Horrifying, gothic, and romantic, Elfman curates another masterpiece to accompany Tim Burton's dark vision." Heather Phares of AllMusic wrote "A highly dramatic, evocative score, Sleepy Hollow may or may not be enjoyable listening outside of the film's context, but it definitely adds another level of depth to an already compelling movie." Ali Barclay of BBC called it a "dramatic score". Justin Santory of MovieWeb wrote "dark, grim, and tense, but still manages to wrap up on a note of a hopeful future."

== Release history ==
The score was first released in CDs through Hollywood Records on November 16, 1999. A four-disc physical edition was published by Intrada Records on July 27, 2021, featuring the contents from the original score, previously unreleased music which included the complete score, alternates and unused recordings. Waxwork Records also issued a double LP that included the complete score. It was later released on October 14, 2022.

== Track listing ==
=== Standard edition ===
No.	Title	Length
1.	"Introduction"	4:15
2.	"Main Titles"	3:09
3.	"Young Ichabod – Album Version"	1:20
4.	"The Story..."	4:28
5.	"Masbath's Terrible Death"	1:35
6.	"Sweet Dreams"	1:11
7.	"A Gift"	2:26
8.	"Into the Woods / the Witch"	3:32
9.	"More Dreams"	1:42
10.	"The Tree of Death"	9:36
11.	"Bad Dream / Tender Moment – Album Version"	3:33
12.	"Evil Eye"	3:43
13.	"The Church Battle"	3:33
14.	"Love Lost"	5:16
15.	"The Windmill"	6:18
16.	"The Chase"	3:11
17.	"The Final Confrontation"	4:16
18.	"A New Day!"	1:29
19.	"End Credits"	3:17
Total length:		67:50

=== Expanded edition ===
Disc 1
No.	Title	Length
1.	"Introduction"	4:16
2.	"Main Titles"	3:09
3.	"Young Ichabod"	1:20
4.	"The Story..."	4:29
5.	"Masbath's Terrible Death"	1:35
6.	"Sweet Dreams"	1:11
7.	"A Gift"	2:26
8.	"Into the Woods/The Witch"	3:32
9.	"More Dreams"	1:42
10.	"The Tree of Death"	9:36
11.	"Bad Dream / Tender Moment"	3:34
12.	"Evil Eye"	3:43
13.	"The Church Battle"	3:34
14.	"Love Lost"	5:16
15.	"The Windmill"	6:18
16.	"The Chase"	3:12
17.	"The Final Confrontation"	4:17
18.	"A New Day!"	1:29
19.	"End Credits"	3:18
Total length:		67:57

Disc 2
No.	Title	Length
1.	"Introduction (Revised)"	4:17
2.	"A Place Called... (Version #2) / Main Titles (Revised)"	5:52
3.	"The Story... (Revised)"	4:30
4.	"Masbath's Terrible Death (Revised)"	1:35
5.	"Murder"	1:32
6.	"Science at Work"	2:27
7.	"Young Masbath"	2:05
8.	"Autopsy/Phony Chase (Revised)"	2:35
9.	"Sweet Dreams (Revised #2)"	1:10
10.	"Family History"	3:47
11.	"Spying (Revised)"	3:18
12.	"Philipse's Death (Alternate)"	1:17
13.	"Dream #2 (Revised)"	1:41
14.	"Into the Woods/The Witch"	4:40
15.	"Mystery Figure (Alternate)"	1:12
16.	"The Tree of Death (Alternate)"	10:20
17.	"Katrina's Brew"	0:34
18.	"Bad Dream/Tender Moment (Version #3)"	3:32
19.	"Trouble in Town"	0:34
20.	"The Will (Revised)"	2:28
21.	"Evil Eye (Revised)"	3:43
22.	"Lady Van T's Hand"	1:18
23.	"The Church Battle (Alternate)"	8:48
Total length:		73:15

Disc 3
No.	Title	Length
1.	"The Windmill (Revised)"	7:41
2.	"The Chase / The Final Confrontation (Version #3) / A New Day! (Revised)"	9:00
3.	"End Credits (Revised)"	3:15
4.	"Introduction (Original)"	3:50
5.	"A Place Called… (Version #1)"	1:33
6.	"Main Titles (Original)"	2:45
7.	"Main Titles (Alternate)"	2:22
8.	"The Story... (Original)"	4:27
9.	"Ichabod's Arrival (Alternate)"	1:27
10.	"Masbath's Terrible Death (Original)"	1:44
11.	"Autopsy/Phony Chase (Original)"	2:33
12.	"Sweet Dreams (Original)"	1:18
13.	"Sweet Dreams (Alternate)"	1:17
14.	"Young Ichabod (Revised #1)"	1:20
15.	"Spying (Original)"	3:26
16.	"Philipse's Death (Original)"	1:17
17.	"Mystery Figure (Original)"	1:10
Total length:		50:25

Disc 4
No.	Title	Length
1.	"The Tree of Death (Original)"	10:23
2.	"Bad Dream / Tender Moment (Original)"	3:31
3.	"Bad Dream / Tender Moment (Version #2)"	3:31
4.	"The Will (Original)"	2:28
5.	"Evil Eye (Original)"	3:45
6.	"The Church Battle (Original)"	8:46
7.	"Love Lost (Revised)"	5:16
8.	"The Windmill (Original)"	7:08
9.	"The Chase / The Final Confrontation (Version #1) / A New Day! (Original)"	9:05
10.	"The Chase / The Final Confrontation (Version #2) / A New Day! (Original)"	9:04
11.	"End Credits (Original)"	3:10
Total length:		66:07

== Personnel ==
Credits adapted from liner notes:

- Music composer and producer – Danny Elfman
- Orchestra – Hollywood Studio Symphony
- Choir – Metro Voices, London Oratory School Schola
- Orchestrations – Albert Olson, Conrad Pope, David Slonaker
- Additional orchestrations – Marc Mann, Mark McKenzie, Steve Bartek
- Orchestra conductor – Allan Wilson
- Orchestra contractor – Andy Brown, Isobel Griffiths
- Choir contractor – Jenny O'Grady
- Concertmaster – Rolf Wilson
- Recording – Shawn Murphy, Jonathan Allen
- Mixing – Robert Fernandez
- Mastering – Andy VanDette
- Music editor – Ellen Segal
- Digital music editor – Craig Anderson, Ellen Segal
- Music production supervisor – Graham Walker
- Music production coordinator – Liz Schrek
- MIDI supervision and preparation– Marc Mann
- Music preparation – Julian Bratolyubov, Ron Vermillion, Vic Fraser
- Executive producer – Adam Schroeder, Scott Rudin, Tim Burton
- Executive in charge of soundtracks for Hollywood Records – Mitchell Leib

== Accolades ==
Awards
Award	Date of ceremony	Category	Recipients	Result
Academy of Science Fiction, Fantasy and Horror Films	June 6, 2000	Best Music	Danny Elfman	Won
BMI Film & Television Awards	December 8, 2014	BMI Film Music Award	Danny Elfman	Won
International Film Music Critics Association	February 23, 2012	Best Archival Release of an Existing Score	Danny Elfman (also for Pee-wee's Big Adventure, Beetlejuice, Batman, Edward Scissorhands, The Nightmare Before Christmas, Big Fish, Charlie and the Chocolate Factory, Corpse Bride and Alice in Wonderland)	Won
International Film Music Critics Association	February 4, 1999	Film Score of the Year	Danny Elfman	Nominated
Las Vegas Film Critics Society Awards	January 18, 2000	Best Score	Danny Elfman	Nominated
Online Film & Television Association	January 12, 2000	Best Original Score	Danny Elfman	Nominated
Satellite Awards	January 16, 2000	Best Original Score	Danny Elfman	Won
