= A Walk on the Moon =

1999 film by Tony Goldwyn

- Theatrical release poster
- Directed by: Tony Goldwyn
- Written by: Pamela Gray
- Produced by: Jay Cohen; Tony Goldwyn; Lee Gottsegen; Dustin Hoffman; Neil Koenigsberg; Murray Schisgal
- Starring: Diane Lane; Viggo Mortensen; Liev Schreiber; Anna Paquin; Tovah Feldshuh
- Cinematography: Anthony B. Richmond
- Edited by: Dana Congdon
- Music by: Mason Daring
- Production company: Village Roadshow Pictures
- Distributed by: Miramax Films
- Release date: April 2, 1999
- Running time: 107 minutes
- Country: United States
- Language: English
- Budget: $14 million
- Box office: $4.8 million

A Walk on the Moon is a 1999 American drama film starring Diane Lane, Viggo Mortensen, Liev Schreiber, and Anna Paquin. The film, which was set against the backdrop of the Woodstock festival of 1969 and the United States's first Moon landing of that year, was distributed by Miramax Films. Directed by Tony Goldwyn in his directorial debut, the film was acclaimed on release. Diane Lane earned an Independent Spirit Award nomination for Best Female Lead for her performance.

== Plot ==
Pearl Kantrowitz and her husband Marty are a lower middle class Jewish couple in New York City. For the summer of 1969, the couple go on their annual vacation at Dr. Fogler's Bungalows in the Catskills with their family, which includes teen daughter Alison, young son Danny, and Marty's mother Lillian.

Marty, who works as a television repairman back in the city, can only visit his family at the camp on the weekends. Pearl, who got pregnant with Alison at 17 and quickly married Marty, feels at a crossroads in her life. She meets Walker Jerome, a free-spirited salesman who goes from resort to resort selling clothes. With Marty absent, Pearl starts spending more time with Walker and they begin an affair.

Meanwhile, Alison undergoes her own summer of changes and experiences teenage rites of passage; her first period, her first date, and her first kiss with a boy at the camp, Ross Epstein.

The impending Moon landing has kept Marty busy at his job, as customers are anxious to have their TV sets ready for the historic event. While the whole town celebrates Neil Armstrong's first steps on the moon, Pearl and Walker have sex in his bus. Marty's mother Lillian learns of the affair and tries to persuade Pearl to break it off. However, the affair continues when Marty cannot visit on the weekend because of the traffic jams caused by the huge Woodstock festival, which is taking place within walking distance of the bungalow colony.

Pearl sneaks off in the night to go to the festival with Walker, leaving the kids with a disappointed Lillian. Alison soon sneaks off as well to attend the festival with her friends, although her mother had explicitly forbidden her to do so. When Alison happens to see Pearl, on LSD, carousing semi-topless with Walker in the festival crowd, she becomes upset and leaves with Ross.

Lillian phones Marty in the morning, simply telling him to find some way through the miles-long gridlock to return to the bungalows. When Pearl returns that evening, Marty confronts her, learning that she is having an affair with the traveling salesman. Upset, he stumbles out of the bungalow, kisses the first woman he comes across, gets punched in the face by her husband and drives off.

A few hours later, Marty returns angrily, waking Danny and Alison to try and take them away back to NYC with him, but Lillian and Pearl stop him. Upset, Alison seeks out Ross, insisting she wants to lose her virginity.

Alison also has an emotional confrontation with Pearl. At first claiming she just had sex, she gets slapped. Then Pearl opens up to her, explaining she got pregnant as a teen, so had to grow up too fast. Marty was the first and only person she had been with.

Pearl is at Walker's when Danny is stung multiple times after throwing rocks at a wasp nest. Walker drives her to the bungalow, helping the family treat the stings. Marty arrives while he is still there, thanking him for the aid.

As Pearl is forced to deal with her love of her family and her conflicting yearning for marital freedom, she finds Walker in the communal garden. She tells him she cannot rip apart her family, which he better understands after having met them. Pearl gives Walker a tearful goodbye embrace.

The final scene shows Pearl and Marty dancing together, first to Dean Martin's "When You're Smiling" and then to Jimi Hendrix's "Purple Haze", after Marty changes the radio station.

== Cast ==
- Diane Lane as Pearl Kantrowitz
- Liev Schreiber as Marty Kantrowitz
- Anna Paquin as Alison Kantrowitz
- Tovah Feldshuh as Lillian Kantrowitz
- Bobby Boriello as Daniel Kantrowitz
- Star Jasper as Rhoda Leiberman
- Joseph Perrino as Ross Epstein
- Lisa Jakub as Myra Naidell
- Viggo Mortensen as Walker Jerome

== Production ==
=== Development ===
Playwright Pamela Gray, inspired by her own experiences vacationing with her family in a Catskills bungalow colony as a youth, first wrote the script in 1992. Gray said, "I remember sitting by the pool in Dr. Locker’s bungalow colony and watching the hippies walk by on the way to Woodstock. And it was this time warp. We’ve got women playing mah-jongg and canasta and the guys are playing pinochle. We are this little ‘50s enclave, and everything outside was in the 1960s." The script was originally titled "The Blouse Man" and won the national Samuel Goldwyn Writing Award.

Gray was unsuccessful in getting the script produced, as financiers told her the story was "too small, too soft, not universal, and too Jewish." Years later, actor Tony Goldwyn, the grandson of Samuel Goldwyn, came across the script by coincidence and was immediately drawn to the story's themes of midlife identity crises and coming of age against the backdrop of the 1960s counterculture. Goldwyn said, ''You suddenly see your life laid out in front of you. And you say, 'Is this the life I dreamed of having? Am I the person I wanted to become?' If the answer's no, that's a very scary moment. And sometimes what it takes to deal with that is very risky: it requires shattering the status quo."

Goldwyn originally intended to only produce, but after not finding a director who shared his passion for the story, decided to direct the film himself.

=== Filming ===
The film was shot in the Laurentian Mountains in eastern Canada over a period of 36 days in the summer of 1997. Liev Schreiber based his character Marty on his own grandfather.

== Soundtrack ==
A Walk on the Moon

Soundtrack album by Various Artists
- Released: March 23, 1999
- Genres: Rock, folk rock
- Length: 54:40
- Label: Sire Records

The soundtrack for the film was released March 23, 1999 through Sire Records. It contains sixteen tracks.

Professional ratings
Review scores
Source	Rating
AllMusic	3/5 stars

A Walk on the Moon
No.	Title	Length
1.	"Sunlight" (The Youngbloods)	3.08
2.	"Town Without Pity" (Mandy Barnett)	2:53
3.	"Wishin' and Hopin'" (Dusty Springfield)	2:54
4.	"Sally Go 'Round the Roses" (Damnations TX)	3:21
5.	"Summertime" (Big Brother and the Holding Company)	3:59
6.	"Crystal Blue Persuasion" (Morcheeba)	3:53
7.	"Today" (Jefferson Airplane)	3:02
8.	"Embryonic Journey" (Jefferson Airplane)	1:51
9.	"Cactus Tree" (Joni Mitchell)	4:37
10.	"Ripple" (The Grateful Dead)	4:11
11.	"Helplessly Hoping" (Taxiride)	2:21
12.	"No Matter What You Do" (Mojave 3)	2:13
13.	"Who Knows Where the Times Goes" (Judy Collins)	4:46
14.	"White Bird" (It's a Beautiful Day)	3:09
15.	"Follow" (Richie Havens)	4:45
16.	"Crimson & Clover" (Elijah Blue Allman and Cher)	3:37
Total length:		54:40

== Release ==
Before its release, the film secured distribution from Miramax. It was first shown at the 1999 Sundance Film Festival, where an enthusiastic reception convinced Miramax to release the film theatrically that spring.

A Walk on the Moon went into limited release on March 26, 1999, and expanded nationwide through the month of April. Its worldwide box office total was $4,750,660.

== Critical reception ==
A Walk on the Moon received positive reviews among critics. Rotten Tomatoes gives the film an approval rating of 73% based on 37 reviews, with an average rating of 6.9/10. The site's consensus states: "An impressive showcase for Diane Lane and an assured debut from director Tony Goldwyn, A Walk on the Moon finds absorbing period drama within a family at a crossroads." Metacritic assigned the film a weighted average score of 70 out of 100, based on 22 critics, indicating "generally favorable" reviews.

Michael Wilmington of the Chicago Tribune wrote that the film "becomes something larger and deeper as we watch" and that the character of Allison is an obvious surrogate for screenwriter Pamela Gray. He added that what makes A Walk in the Moon interesting is its refusal to take sides or villainize any one person given that it "is about that old '60s polarity -- the hip and the square, the trapped and the free." Stephen Hunter of The Washington Post praised Diane Lane's "capacity to express the yearning that Pearl feels as authentically as the guilt she suffers." He also described Marty as a "schlumph". Janet Maslin of The New York Times wrote, "Even when it turns turbulent, the film sustains its warm summer glow, and makes itself a conversation piece about the moral issues it means to raise."

Ty Burr of Entertainment Weekly gave a more mixed review and criticized the film's ending, but noted "'A Walk on the Moon' still nails the cultural crosscurrents of 1969 — the way that a woman who has been walking the straight and narrow for years could suddenly give in to all the freedom rushing by around her."

Desson Howe, also of the Washington Post, found the film "a little too perfect and symbolically signposted for its own good". Roger Ebert gave a mixed review but singled out Anna Paquin’s performance, saying her plot line “as a teenage girl struggling with new ideas and raging hormones” is the film’s most compelling story.

Readers of Entertainment Weekly ranked the film as #9 on the magazine's "50 Sexiest Movies Ever" poll in 2008.

== Accolades ==
Award	Category	Recipient(s)	Result	Ref.
Chlotrudis Awards	Best Supporting Actor	Liev Schreiber	Nominated	
Independent Spirit Awards	Best Female Lead	Diane Lane	Nominated	
National Board of Review Awards	Special Recognition for Excellence in Filmmaking		Won	
Satellite Awards	Best Screenplay – Original	Pamela Gray	Nominated	
Young Artist Awards	Best Performance in a Feature Film - Supporting Young Actress	Anna Paquin	Nominated	
YoungStar Awards	Best Performance by a Young Actress in a Drama Film	Anna Paquin	Nominated	

== Musical adaptation ==
Pamela Gray adapted her script into a stage musical, with music and lyrics by Paul Scott Goodman and AnnMarie Milazzo. The musical was first staged by the American Conservatory Theater in San Francisco in June 2018. The musical was set to debut at the George Street Playhouse in New Jersey in 2020 but was delayed due to COVID-19 restrictions. The play ultimately opened on April 26, 2022 presented by the George Street Playhouse. The production starred Jackie Burns, Jonah Platt, John Arthur Green, and Carly Gendell. In 2026, it was announced that the musical would open off-Broadway at the Laura Pels Theatre in summer 2026. Talia Suskauer, Max Chernin, Sam Gravitte, and Andréa Burns will lead the production, and Sheryl Kaller will direct.
