= Jane Hamilton =

American novelist (born 1957)

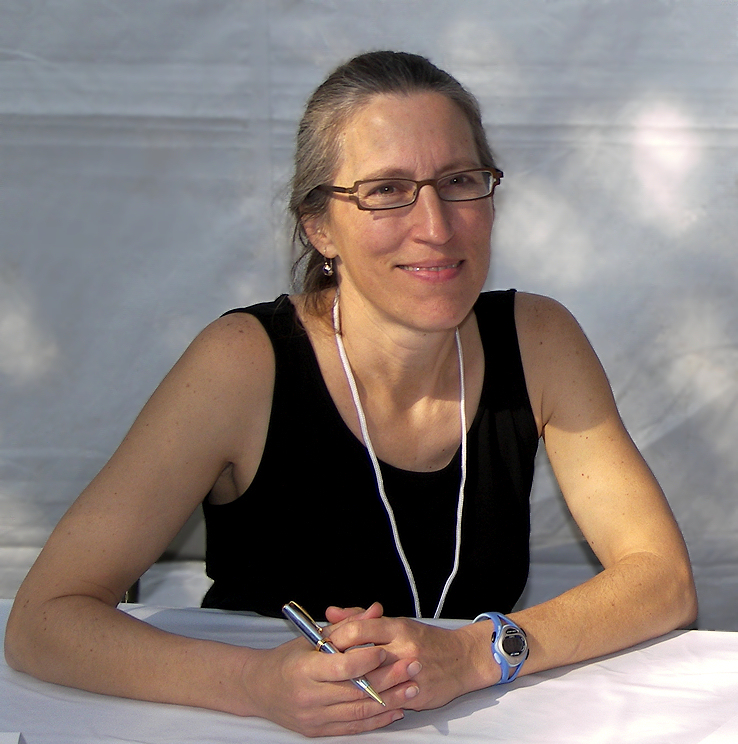
- Hamilton at the 2007 Texas Book Festival
- Born: July 13, 1957 (age 69); Oak Park, Illinois, U.S.
- Education: Carleton College
- Occupation: Novelist
- Writing career
- Notable works: The Book of Ruth; A Map of the World
- Notable awards: Hemingway Foundation/PEN Award, 1988
- Website: janehamiltonbooks.com

Jane Hamilton (born July 13, 1957) is an American novelist.

== Early life ==
Jane Hamilton was born and grew up in Oak Park, Illinois (U.S.), the youngest of five children. She won prizes for poetry and short stories throughout high school and college but was always told that being a writer would not be a viable career. Because she was not a good speller, she did not believe she could be a copy editor or editor either. She graduated from Oak Park and River Forest High School in 1975.

Hamilton was accepted as an intern with Dell Publishing for Children after college and set out for New York with intention of becoming an editor. She reports that she stopped to visit a friend's apple orchard in Rochester, Wisconsin. It was there that she met her future husband, a partner in the orchard operation. Soon after, she moved to the orchard farmhouse, which allowed her the freedom to write during the off-season for harvesting.

Despite rejection from the graduate programs she applied to, Hamilton kept writing in her spare time. In 1983, her short story, "My Own Earth" launched her career when an intern pulled it from a slush pile and passed it up to Harper's Magazine editor, Helen Rogan. The publication of "My Own Earth" was soon followed by more success when her short story "Aunt Marj's Happy Ending" was published by Harper's Magazine in December 1983. "Aunt Marj's Happy Ending" later appeared in The Best American Short Stories 1984

Her first novel, The Book of Ruth, was published in 1988 and won the Hemingway Foundation/PEN Award, Great Lakes College Association New Writers Award, and the Wisconsin Library Association Banta Book Award in 1989. The Book of Ruth was an Oprah's Book Club selection in 1996, and it was the basis for a 2004 television film of the same title.

In 1994, she published A Map of the World, which was adapted for a film in 1999 and the same year was also an Oprah's Book Club selection. Her third novel, The Short History of a Prince, published in 1998, was a Publishers Weekly Best Book of 1998. This book was also shortlisted for the 1999 Orange Prize. In 2000, Hamilton was named a Notable Wisconsin Author by the Wisconsin Library Association.

All of her books are set, at least in part, in Wisconsin. "A Map of the World" is set in Racine County, Wis. Of her writing, novelist Laura Moriarty says: "I like Jane Hamilton for her compassionate portrayals of characters most people would ridicule, and the way her books show the beauty of rural life without romanticizing it."

In a November 2006 interview with The Journal Times, Hamilton talked about her early inspiration for writing novels. As a student at Carleton College, she overheard a professor say she would write a novel one day. Hamilton had written only two short stories for the professor's class. Overhearing the conversation gave her confidence. "It had a lot more potency, the fact that I overheard it, rather than his telling me directly," she said.

== Personal life ==
Hamilton is married with children. Much of Hamilton's work reflects her personal experiences, displayed through the settings, characters, and events that occur in her writing. She attributes her success to the influence of strong women in her life who were writers, her husband and relatives who provided her with an environment in which she could work, and pure luck. She is thankful for the support of her husband, who she reads aloud her work to for feedback and who encouraged her work through the years. Hamilton resides at the orchard today, the place where she raised a family and wrote all of the novels she is known for. She reports that writing continues to be her "obsession" and that she writes every day.

== Works ==
- The Book of Ruth (1988)
- A Map of the World (1994)
- The Short History of a Prince (1998)
- Disobedience (2000)
- When Madeline Was Young (2006)
- Laura Rider's Masterpiece (2009)
- The Excellent Lombards (2016)
- The Phoebe Variations (2025)
