= Racine County Sheriff's Office =

Jurisdictional structure
- Operations jurisdiction: Racine County, Wisconsin, Wisconsin, United States
- Legal jurisdiction: Racine County, Wisconsin
- General nature: Local civilian police

Operational structure
- Headquarters: Racine, Wisconsin
- Sheriff responsible: Christopher Schmaling

Website
- racinecounty.com

The Racine County Sheriff's Office is the principal law enforcement agency that serves Racine County, providing police services to multiple areas throughout the county, including contracted areas. The current sheriff is Christopher Schmaling, a Republican who was first elected in 2010.

== Leadership ==
=== Sheriff ===
The incumbent sheriff of Racine County is Christopher Schmaling. Schmaling has been part of the sheriff's office since 1996. He was first elected in the 2010 midterm election, receiving 63 percent of the vote. Schmaling took office on January 3, 2011, replacing retiring sheriff Robert Carlson, who had served in the position since 2003.

Schmaling is a Republican and member of the Constitutional Sheriffs and Peace Officers Association, and has campaigned for Donald Trump. During the COVID-19 pandemic in Wisconsin, Schmaling refused to enforce the state's stay-at-home order, claiming it was unconstitutional. In 2021, Schmaling accused the Wisconsin Elections Commission of breaking the law during the 2020 election, in connection with claims of voter fraud during the 2020 presidential election: the Racine County prosecutor declined to bring charges. In 2022, Schmaling declined to investigate a man who had requested fraudulent absentee ballots in order to demonstrate weaknesses in the absentee ballot request system.

=== Chief deputy ===
The chief deputy of the sheriff's office serves as the sheriff's second-in-command. The current chief deputy is James Weidner. The previous chief deputy is John C. Hanrahan. In 2004, the Wisconsin Association of Homicide Investigators awarded him with the Michael Vendola Death Investigator of the Year Award. He was involved in the investigation of Racine County Jane Doe.

== Jail ==
The Racine County Jail, located in downtown Racine and sharing a block with the Racine County Law Enforcement Center, is the primary detention facility of the county and the sheriff's office. The jail has a maximum capacity of 876 inmates, making it one of the largest non-state detention facilities in Wisconsin. As of December 2015, the jail had a population of 667. The current administrator of the Racine County Jail is Captain Bradley Friend.
