= A Map of the World =

1994 novel by Jane Hamilton

- First edition
- Author: Jane Hamilton
- Language: English
- Publisher: Doubleday
- Publication date: 1994
- Publication place: United States
- Media type: Print (hardback & paperback)
- Pages: 390 pp
- ISBN: 0-385-47310-9
- OCLC: 29521064
- Dewey Decimal: 813/.54 20
- LC Class: PS3558.A4428 M36 1994

A Map of the World (1994) is a novel by Jane Hamilton. It was the Oprah's Book Club selection for December 1999. It was made into a movie released in 1999 starring Sigourney Weaver, Julianne Moore, David Strathairn, Chloë Sevigny, Louise Fletcher and Marc Donato with a soundtrack by Pat Metheny.

== Plot summary ==
The book is concerned with how one seemingly inconsequential moment can alter lives forever. Alice Goodwin, mother of two, school nurse and wife of an aspiring dairy farmer in Wisconsin, is getting ready to take her two daughters and her best friend Theresa's two little girls to their farm pond to swim. When she goes upstairs to find her bathing suit, Lizzy, Theresa's 2-year-old, slips away to the pond and drowns. Alice is consumed with guilt while her husband Howard silently distracts himself with the hard work of running their farm. Although Alice had never been entirely comfortable living in their small town, and the townspeople had never been fully accepting of Alice and Howard, who were viewed as hippies trying their hand at farming, she and Howard found their farm to be a comforting refuge. With the drowning, however, the townspeople sharpen their disapproval of Alice which then encourages a woman, whom Alice reprimanded for constantly bringing her sick son to school, to accuse Alice of molesting her child. Several other mothers then also come forward with tales of Alice's "abuse".

Alice's and Howard's lives are shattered. Alice is imprisoned with a group of younger women whose life circumstances seem vastly different from hers, but for whom Alice develops a respect for their unvarnished honesty. While Alice is in the Racine County Jail, Howard tries to cope with running their farm, visiting Alice in jail, and caring for their girls, but becomes despondent and overwhelmed. He is saved when Theresa, who is still grief-stricken, but has forgiven Alice, offers her help with caring for the girls. Theresa and Howard become close, causing both of them to feel gratitude and remorse; they end the relationship before they become romantically involved.

The book is narrated in three parts: Alice narrates the first part looking back a year later to describe their lives immediately before and after Lizzy's death; Howard narrates the second part describing his struggles while Alice is in jail, and Alice again narrates the third part describing her release on bail and the subsequent trial. In speaking, Alice has a habit of making off-beat, eccentric observations, which Howard finds annoying, but which also lends her narration an air of tragicomedy. Howard describes his increasing desperation that leads him to bond with Theresa, but then to sell their beloved farm to raise funds for Alice's release on bail. Alice's trial for molestation highlights the workings of the legal system and especially the hysteria that can arise from accusations of mass child molestations. While Alice is ultimately acquitted, she and Howard know that their lives can never be fully mended. The power of forgiveness is one of the central themes throughout the book. Alice is unable to forgive herself after Lizzy's drowning even while Theresa finds it in her heart and faith to forgive Alice.

== Reception ==
Kirkus Reviews calls A Map of the World a 'strong, compelling story', one that 'maps the best and worst of the human heart and all the mysterious, uncharted country in between.' Publishers Weekly draws attention to the spare honesty of Hamilton's writing and the story's 'universal implications'.
