= Dan Angel =

American film producer

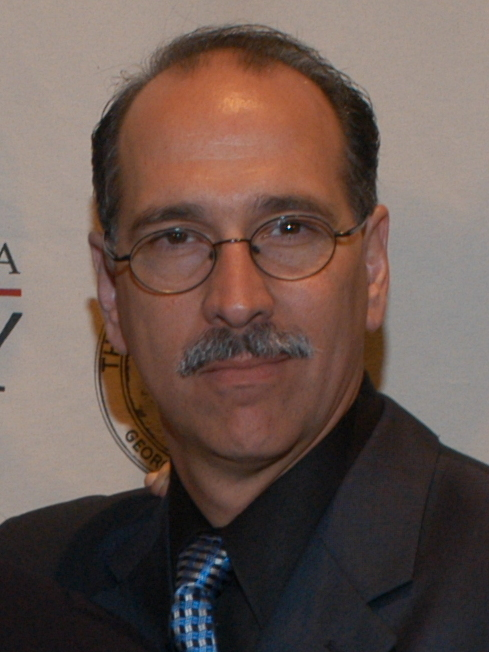
- Angel in 2003
- Born: Newport Beach, California, U.S.
- Occupations: Producer, showrunner, writer, story-editor
- Known for: Sci-fi, horror, supernatural, thriller, family entertainment, movies and series
- Spouse: Cindy Angel

Dan Angel is an American film and television producer, screenwriter, story editor and showrunner.

Angel has written, co-written films and TV series including The X-Files, Goosebumps, Animorphs, Gifted Hands: The Ben Carson Story, Door to Door, R. L. Stine's The Haunting Hour: Don't Think About It, Christmas in Canaan, R. L. Stine's The Haunting Hour: The Series and Dan Vs..

His awards include Primetime Emmy Award for Outstanding Made for Television Movie and Peabody Award for Door to Door. and another Emmy Award for Outstanding Children's Series in his work on R. L. Stine's The Haunting Hour: The Series.

== Education and career ==
Born and raised in Newport Beach, California, Angel attended UCLA School of Theater, Film and Television where he studied screenwriting and production.

In 1984, Angel began writing and producing for the sketch comedy series The Homemade Comedy Special. In 1993, Angel wrote and produced the Showtime Networks film John Carpenter Presents: Body Bags with his writing partner Billy Brown. Angel and Brown transitioned into series television, writing and story editing for the 1995–98 series Goosebumps. Angel and Brown also wrote and story edited for the fifth season (1997–98) of The X-Files.

Angel wrote, produced and created Animorphs (1998–99), the hour-long Fox network horror anthology series Night Visions (2001–02), and the series Young Blades (2005).

In 2002, Dan produced the film adaptation Door to Door, the memoir of Bill Porter Angel received a Peabody Award, a Critic's Choice Award, and an AFI Award. Angel later produced Gifted Hands: The Ben Carson Story and Hallmark Channel's Christmas in Canaan. He has also produced several direct-to-DVD films and network television TV shows. He was executive producer of R. L. Stine's The Haunting Hour, and Dan Vs.

Angle has served as partner and Chief creative officer of The Hatchery, LLC production company since 2003.

== Personal life ==
Angel is married to Cindy Angel. The couple lives in Burbank, California and have daughters Jessica and Nikki, and son Matt Angel, who is an actor.

== Selected filmography ==
=== Telefilms ===
- John Carpenter Presents: Body Bags (1993) (writer, executive producer)
- Door to Door (2002) (executive producer)
- R. L. Stine's The Haunting Hour: Don't Think About It (2007) (writer, executive producer)
- Gifted Hands: The Ben Carson Story (2009) (executive producer)
- Christmas in Canaan (2009) (executive producer)

=== Television series ===
- The Homemade Comedy Special (1984) (writer, producer)
- Goosebumps (1995–1998) (writer, story editor)
- The X-Files (1997–1998) (writer, story editor)
- Animorphs (1998–1999) (writer, supervising producer)
- The Fearing Mind (2000) (executive producer)
- Night Visions (2001–2002) (writer, executive producer)
- Young Blades (2005) (writer, executive producer)
- The Zula Patrol (2005) (executive producer)
- Dan Vs. (2011–2013) (executive producer)
- R. L. Stine's The Haunting Hour: The Series (2010-2014) (writer, executive producer)

== Awards ==
Leo Awards Nominee – R.L. Stine's Monsterville: Cabinet of Souls – Best Television Movie – 2016

Emmy Awards Nominee – R.L. Stine's Monsterville: Cabinet of Souls – Outstanding Special Class Special – 2016

Emmy Awards – Winner – R.L. Stine's The Haunting Hour – Outstanding Children's Series – 2015

Emmy Awards – Nominee – Spooksville – Outstanding Children's Series – 2015

Emmy Awards – Nominee – Spooksville – Best Writing In a Children's Series –2015

WGC – Nominee – R.L. Stine's The Haunting Hour – Best Writing in a Children's Series – Episode: Good will Towards Men – 2015

Emmy Awards – Winner – R.L. Stine's The Haunting Hour – Outstanding Children's Series – 2014

Emmy Awards – Nominee – R.L. Stine's The Haunting Hour – Best Writing In a Children's Series – 2014

Emmy Awards – Nominee – Outstanding Special Class Best Animated Series – Dan Vs. – 2014

Emmy Awards – Winner – R.L. Stine's The Haunting Hour – Outstanding Children's Series – 2013

Emmy Awards – Nominee – Outstanding Special Class Best Animated Series – Dan Vs. – 2013

Emmy Awards – Nominee – R.L. Stine's The Haunting Hour – Best Writing In a Children's Series – 2013

TCA Award – Television Critics Association – Nominee – R.L. Stine's The Haunting Hour – Outstanding Achievement In Youth Programming – 2011

BFCA Critics Choice Awards – Nominee – Best Picture Made For Television – Gifted Hands – 2009

WGA Awards – Nominee – R.L. Stine's The Haunting Hour Movie – Best Writing Children's Long form – 2008

Critics Choice Awards – Winner – Best Picture – Door To Door – 2003

Emmy Awards – Winner – Door To Door – Best Made For TV Movie – 2003

Peabody Award Winner – Best Picture – Door To Door – 2003

Producers Guild Awards – Winner – Diversity Award – Door To Door – 2003

WGA Awards – Winner – Goosebumps – Best Writing Children's TV – 1997

Year	Film/Series	Role	Notes
1994	John Carpenter Presents: Body Bags	Writer, Executive Producer	CableACE Award for Writing a Dramatic Series for episode "Hair"
1997	Goosebumps	Writer, Story-editor	Writers Guild of America Award for Children's Script for episode "Cuckoo Clock of Doom"
1998	The X-Files	Writer, Story-editor	
2002–2003	Door to Door	Executive Producer	Critic's Choice Award for Best Picture Made For Television; Peabody Award; Primetime Emmy Award for Outstanding Made for Television Movie; Primetime Emmy Award for Outstanding Writing for a Miniseries, Movie or a Dramatic Special; Primetime Emmy Award for Outstanding Lead Actor in a Miniseries or a Movie; Primetime Emmy Award for Outstanding Directing for a Miniseries, Movie or a Dramatic Special; Primetime Emmy Award for Outstanding Makeup for a Miniseries, Movie or a Special (Prosthetic); Nominated for Primetime Emmy Award for Outstanding Supporting Actress in a Miniseries or a Movie; Nominated for Primetime Emmy Award for Outstanding Cinematography for a Miniseries, Movie, or Dramatic Special; Nominated for Primetime Emmy Award for Outstanding Single-Camera Picture Editing for a Miniseries, Movie or a Special; Nominated for Primetime Emmy Award for Outstanding Casting for a Miniseries, Movie, or a Special; Nominated for Golden Globe Award for Best Actor – Miniseries or Television Film; Nominated for Golden Globe Award for Best Actress – Miniseries or Television Film; Nominated for Humanitas Prize (2003) for 90 minutes or longer category Nominated for Screen Actors Guild Award for Outstanding Performance by a Male Actor in a Television Movie or Miniseries; Nominated for Screen Actors Guild Award for Outstanding Performance by a Female Actor in a Television Movie or Miniseries
2007	R. L. Stine's The Haunting Hour: Don't Think About It	Writer, Producer and Executive Producer	Nominated for Writers Guild of America Award for Children's Script – Long Form or Special
2009–2010	Gifted Hands: The Ben Carson Story	Executive Producer	Nominated for Critic's Choice Award for Best Film Made for TV; Nominated for Humanitas Prize for 90 Minute or Longer Network or Syndicated Television; NAACP Image Award for Outstanding Television Movie, Mini-Series or Dramatic Special; NAACP Image Award for Outstanding Actor in a Television Movie, Mini-Series or Dramatic Special; NAACP Image Award for Outstanding Actress in a Television Movie, Mini-Series or Dramatic Special; Nominated for Primetime Emmy Award for Outstanding Cinematography for a Miniseries or Movie; Nominated for Primetime Emmy Award for Outstanding Hairstyling for a Miniseries or a Movie; Nominated for Primetime Emmy Award for Outstanding Makeup for a Miniseries or a Movie (Non-Prosthetic); Nominated for Primetime Emmy Award for Outstanding Sound Mixing for a Miniseries or a Movie; Nominated for Screen Actor's Guild Award for Outstanding Performance by a Male Actor in a Television Movie or Miniseries
2011	R. L. Stine's The Haunting Hour: The Series	Writer and Executive Producer	Leo Award for Best Youth or Children's Program or Series; Leo Award for Best Direction in a Youth or Children's Program or Series; Leo Award for Best Performance in a Youth or Children's Program or Series; Leo Award for Best Picture Editing in a Dramatic Series; Leo Award for Best Sound Editing in a Youth or Children's Program or Series; Nominated for Leo Award for Best Screenwriting in a Youth or Children's Program; Parents' Choice Award Fun Stuff Award; Nominated for Critics' Choice Television Award in Outstanding Achievement in Children's Programming
2012	R. L. Stine's The Haunting Hour: The Series	Writer and Executive Producer	Nominated for Daytime Emmy Award for Outstanding Performer in a Children's Series; Nominated for Daytime Emmy Award for Directing for a Children's Series; Nominated for Daytime Emmy Award for Outstanding Achievement in Single Camera Photography (Film or Electronic); Nominated for Daytime Emmy Award for Outstanding Achievement in Costume Design/Styling; Nominated for Daytime Emmy Award for Outstanding Achievement in Makeup; Nominated for Daytime Emmy Award for Outstanding Achievement in Single Camera Editing; Leo Award for Best Picture Editing in a Dramatic Series; Nominated for Leo Award for Best Direction in a Youth or Children's Program or Series; Nominated for Leo Award for Best Cinematography in a Dramatic Series; Nominated for Leo Award for Best Performance in a Youth or Children's Program or Series; Parents' Choice Award Fun Stuff Award; Young Artists Award for Best Performance in a TV Series – Guest Starring Young Actor 11–13 (with five more nominations)
