= 60th Golden Globe Awards =

Film award ceremony in 2003

- Date: January 19, 2003
- Site: Beverly Hilton Hotel, Beverly Hills, Los Angeles, California

Highlights
- Best Film: Drama: The Hours
- Best Film: Musical or Comedy: Chicago
- Best Drama Series: The Shield
- Best Musical or Comedy Series: Curb Your Enthusiasm
- Best Miniseries or Television movie: The Gathering Storm
- Most awards: (3) Chicago
- Most nominations: (8) Chicago

Television coverage
- Network: NBC

The 60th Golden Globe Awards, honoring the best in film and television for 2002, were held on January 19, 2003, in the Beverly Hilton Hotel, Beverly Hills, California. The nominations were announced on December 19, 2002.

== Winners and nominees ==
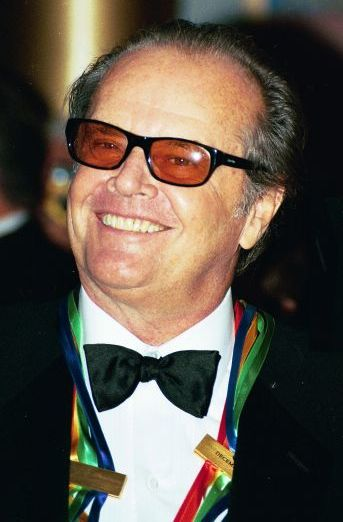
Jack Nicholson, Best Actor in a Motion Picture – Drama winner

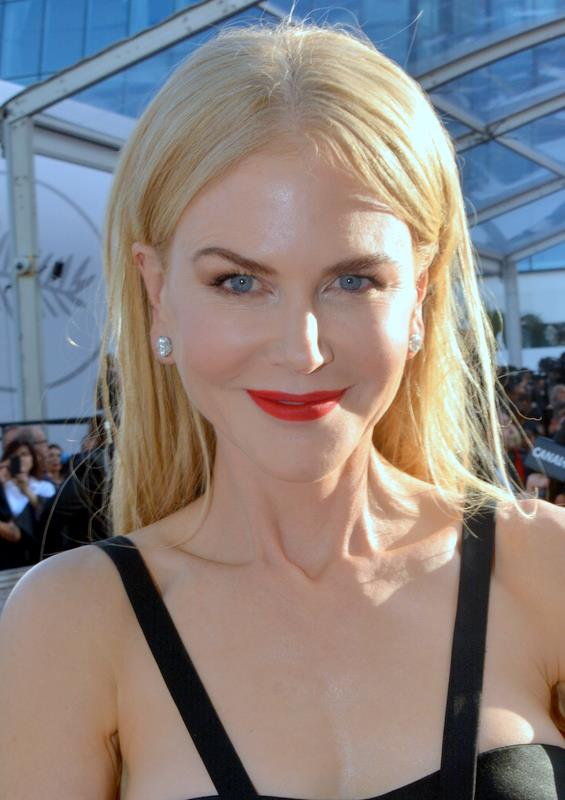
Nicole Kidman, Best Actress in a Motion Picture – Drama winner

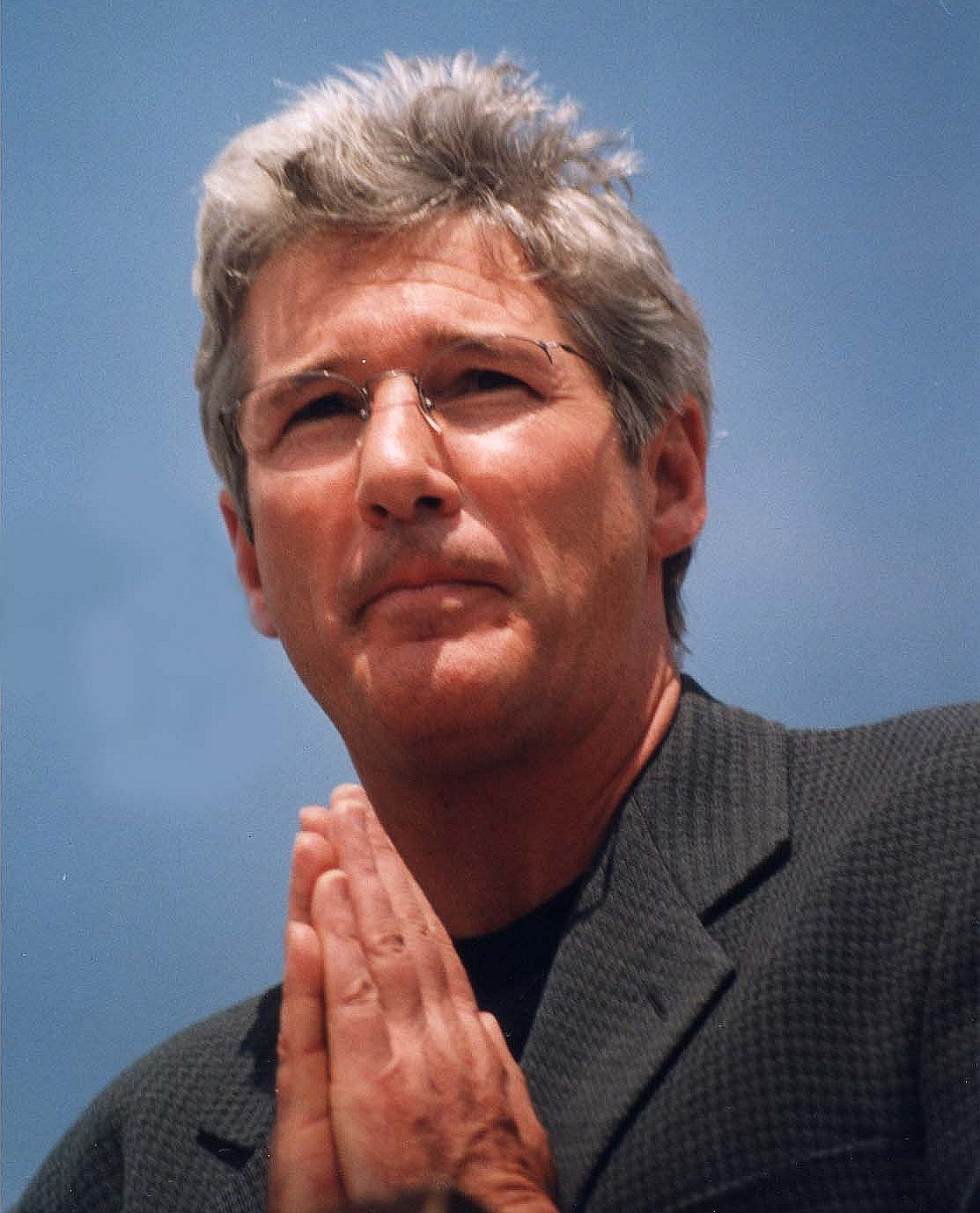
Richard Gere, Best Actor in a Motion Picture – Musical or Comedy winner

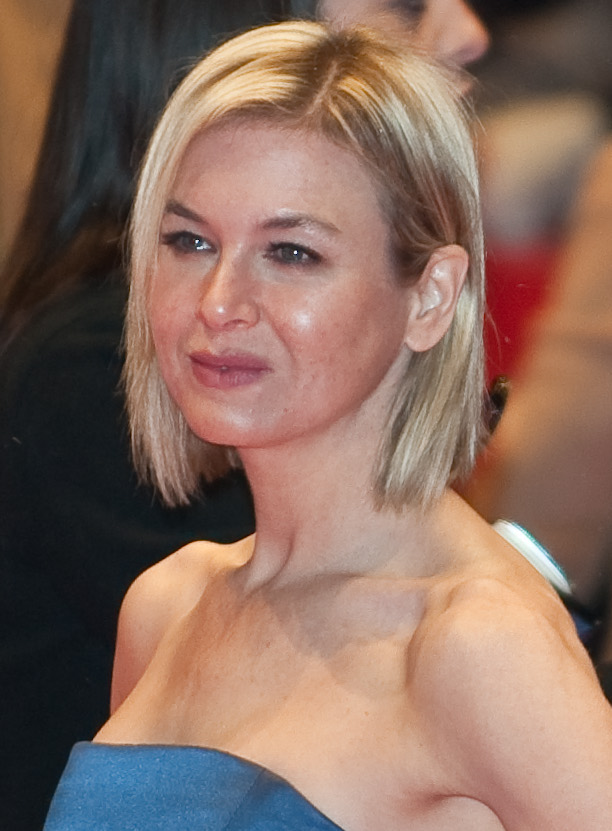
Renée Zellweger, Best Actress in a Motion Picture – Musical or Comedy winner

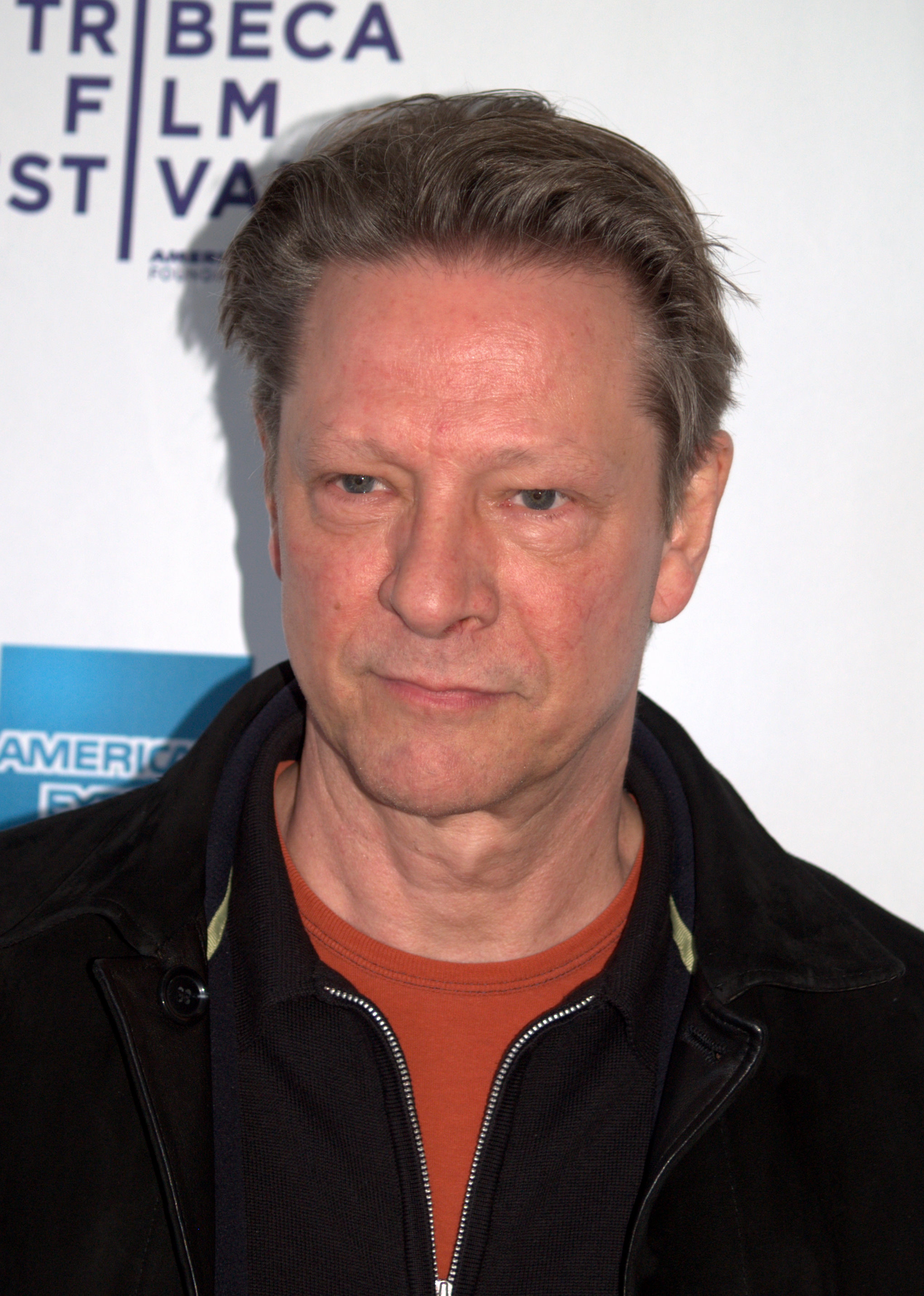
Chris Cooper, Best Supporting Actor winner

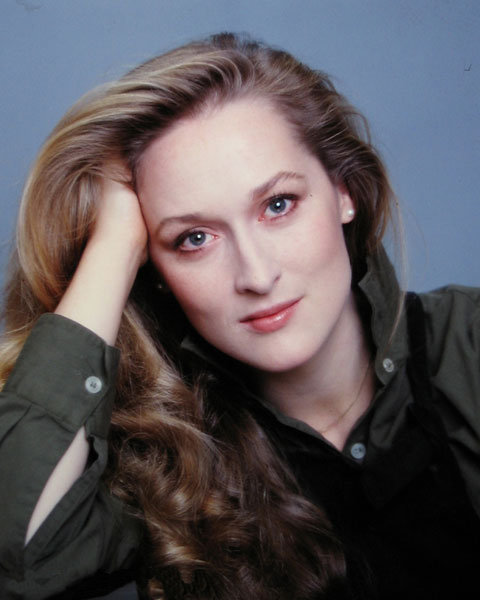
Meryl Streep, Best Supporting Actress winner

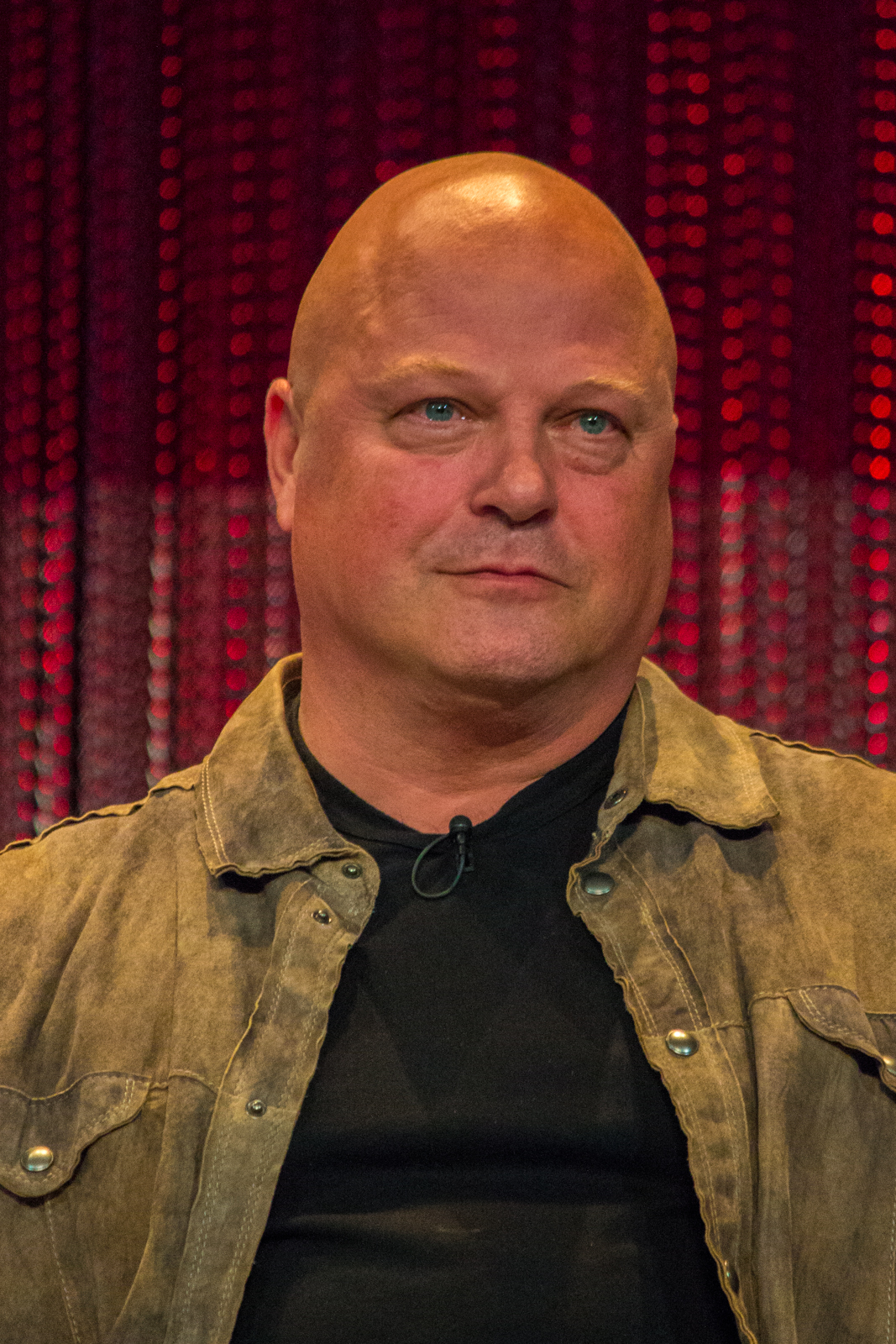
Michael Chiklis, Best Actor in a Television Series – Drama winner

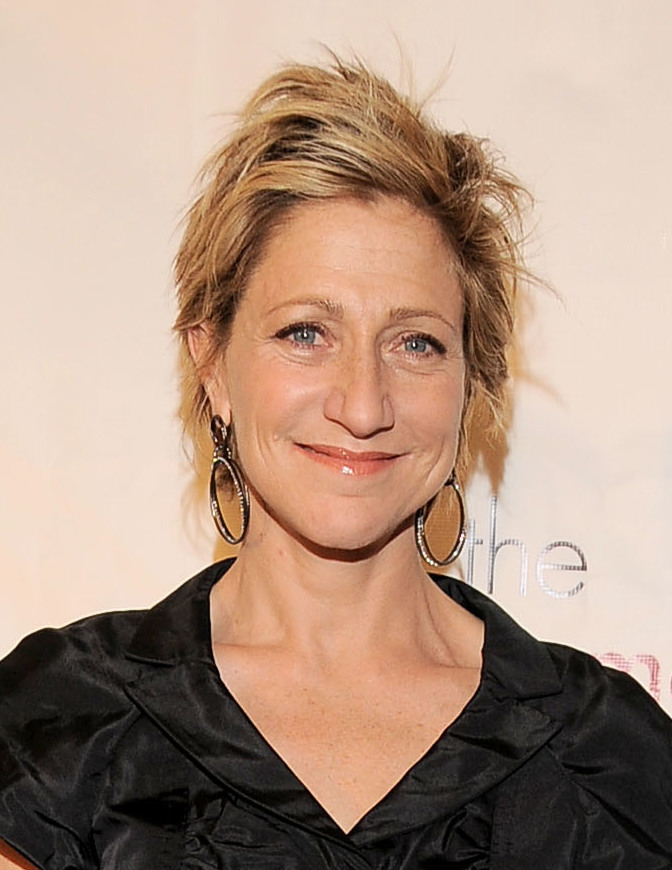
Edie Falco, Best Actress in a Television Series – Drama winner

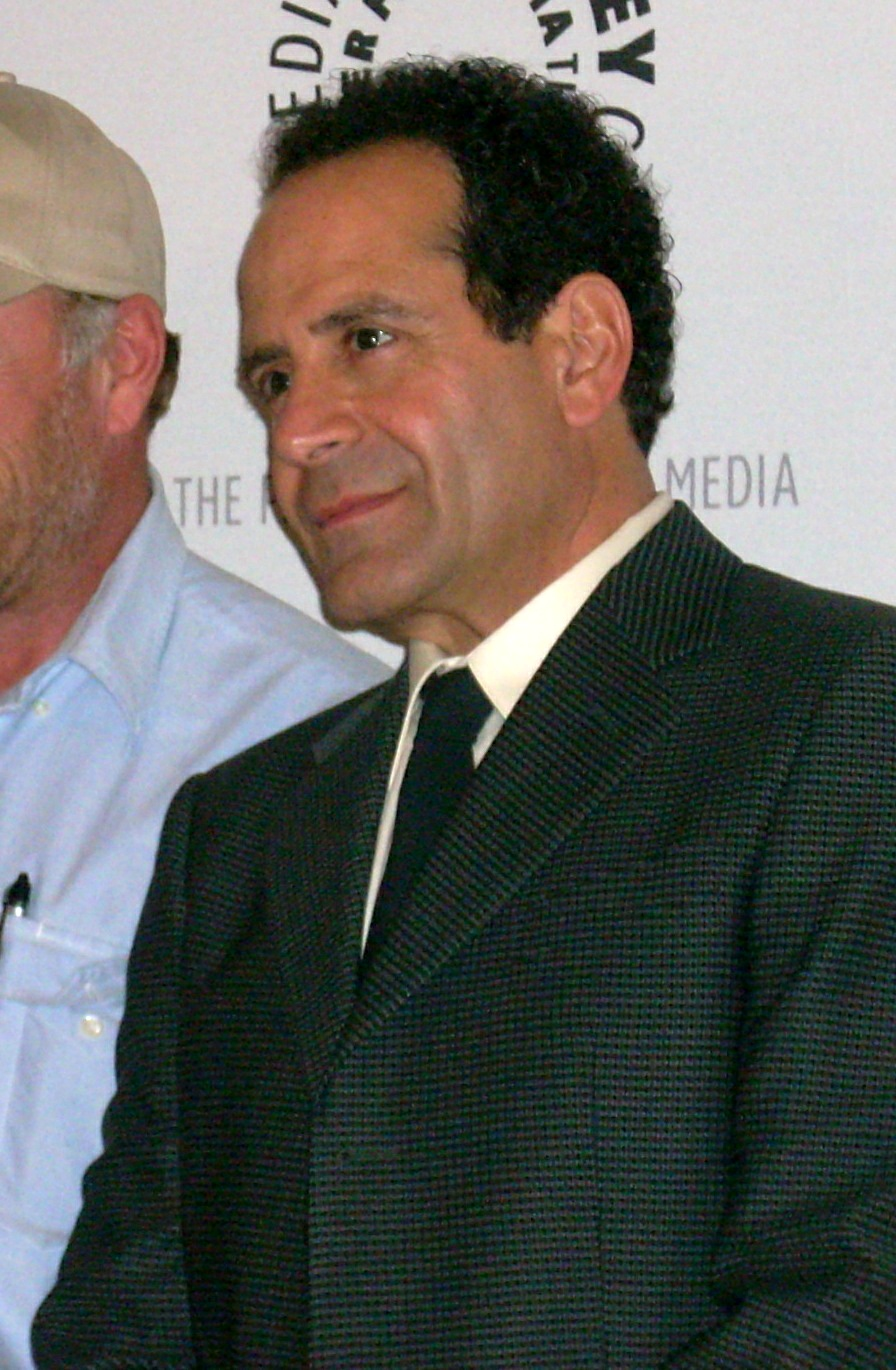
Tony Shalhoub, Best Actor in a Television Series – Musical or Comedy winner

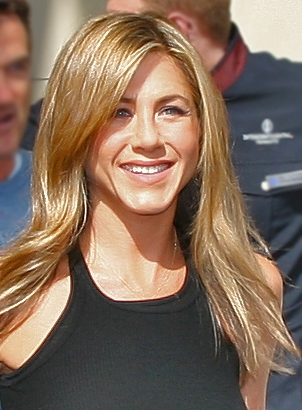
Jennifer Aniston, Best Actress in a Television Series – Musical or Comedy winner

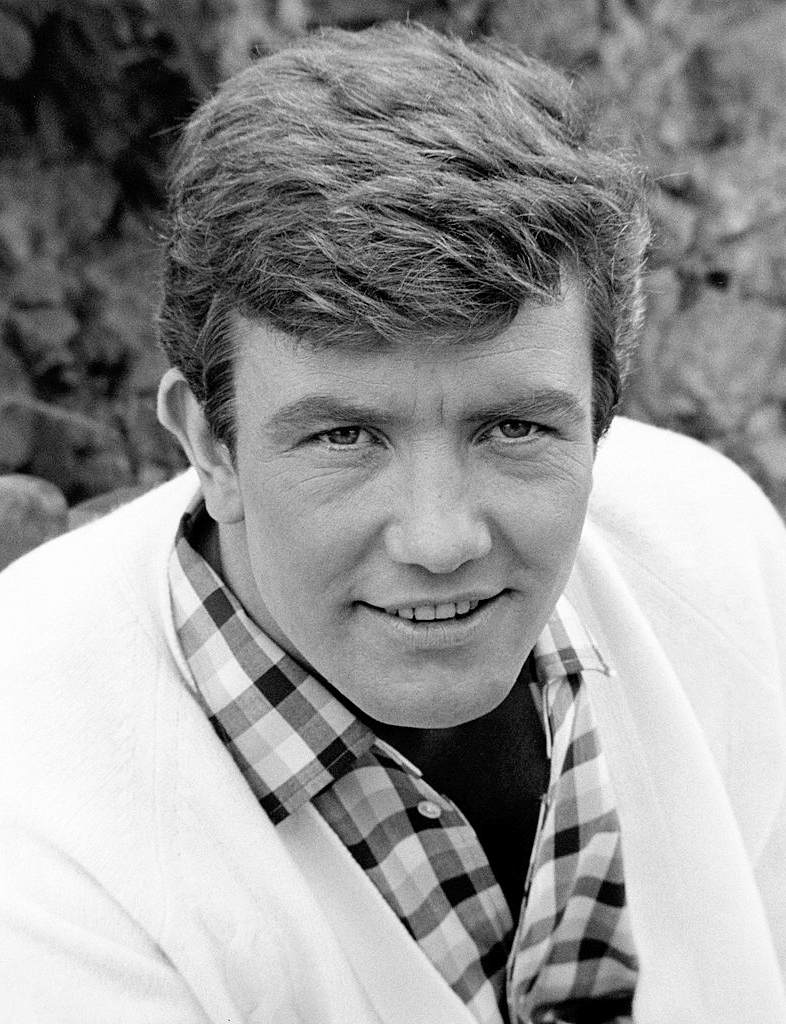
Albert Finney, Best Actor in a Miniseries or Television Film winner

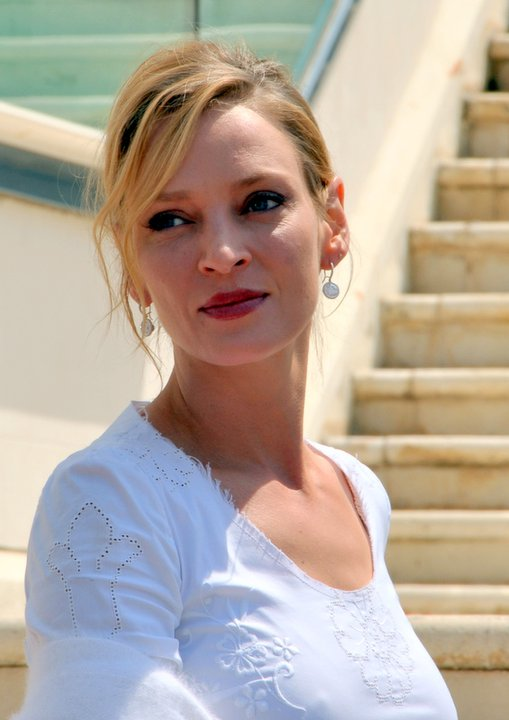
Uma Thurman, Best Actress in a Miniseries or Television Film winner

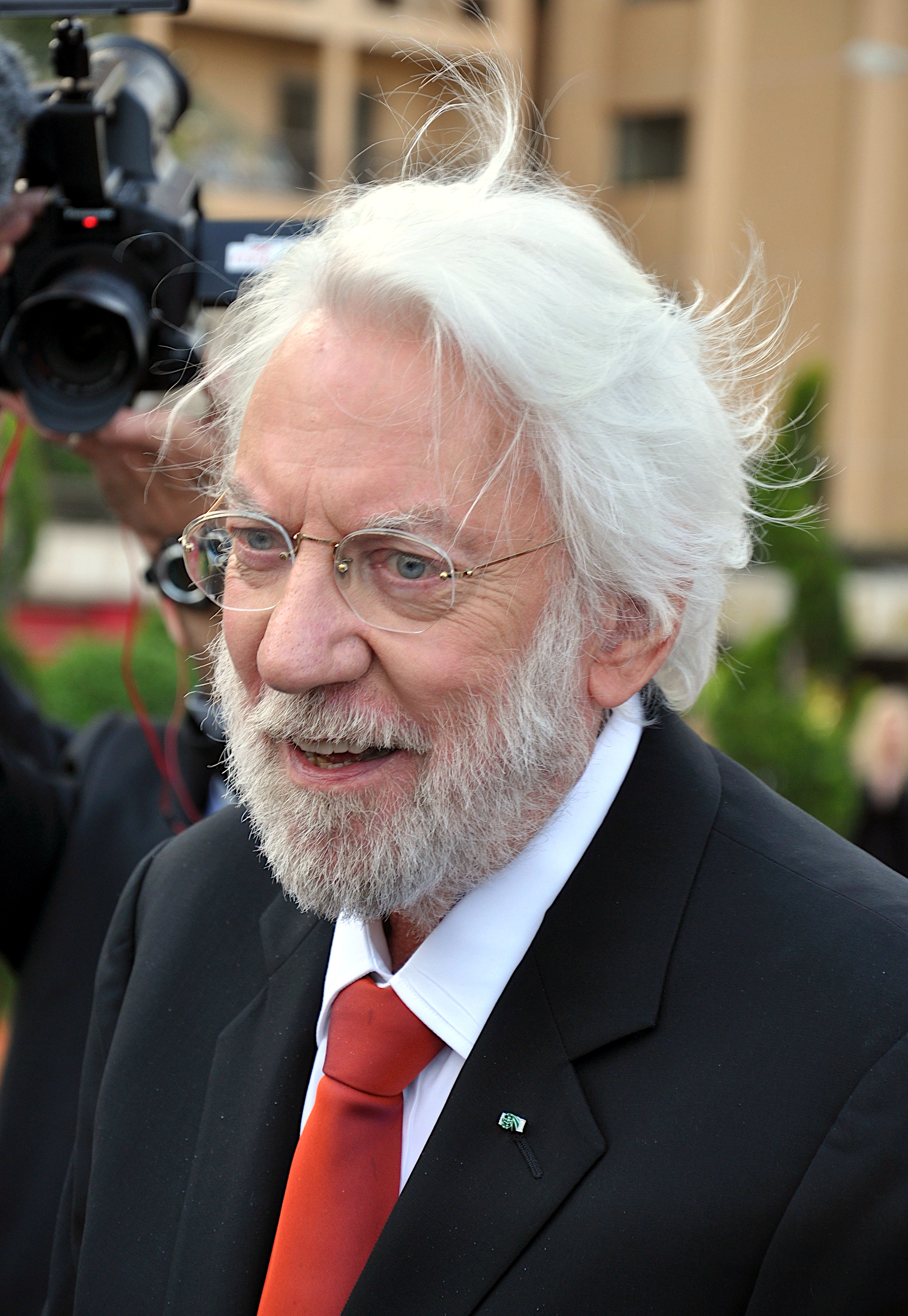
Donald Sutherland, Best Supporting Actor in a Series, Miniseries, or Television Film winner

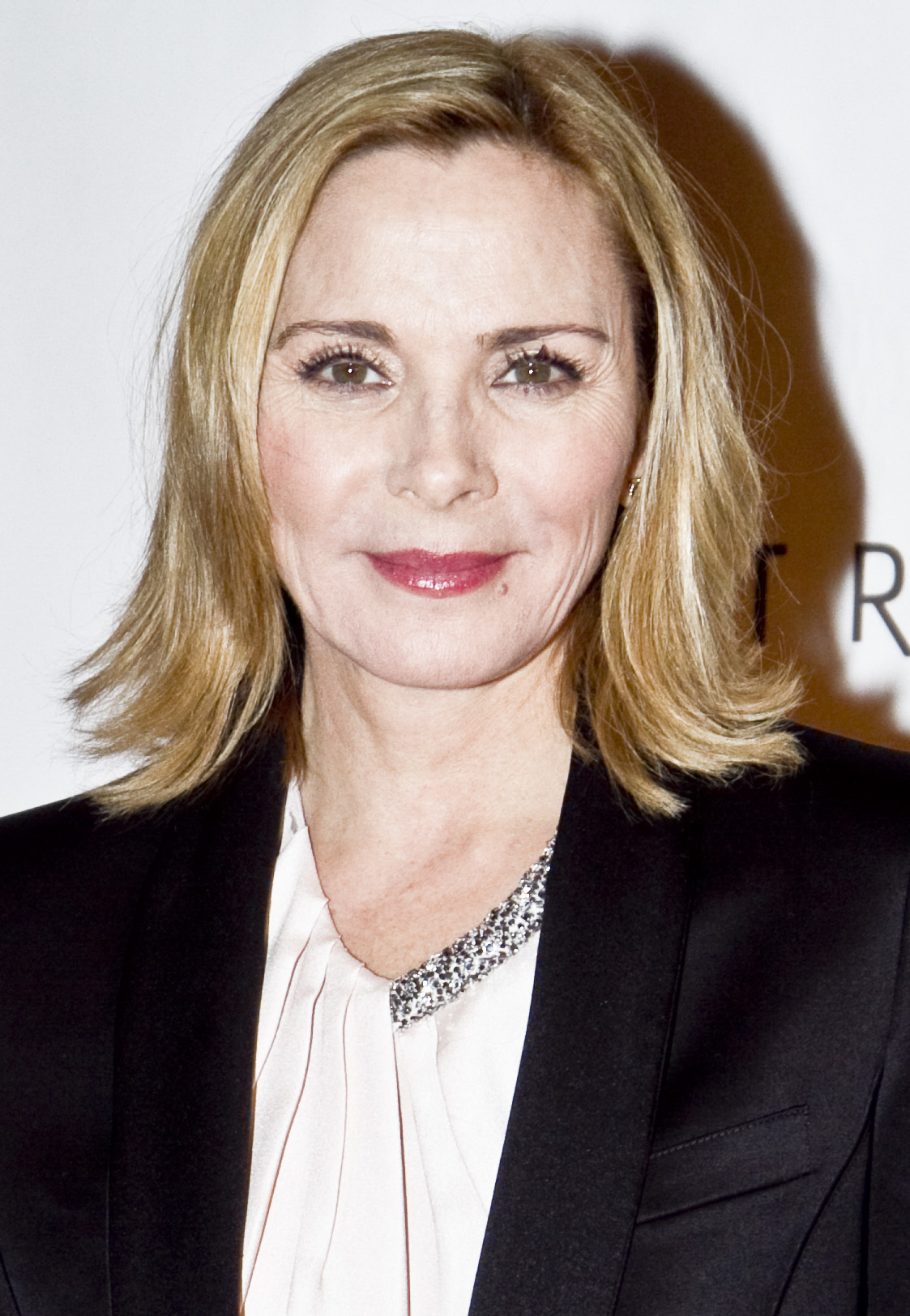
Kim Cattrall, Best Supporting Actress in a Series, Miniseries, or Television Film winner

These are the nominees for the 60th Golden Globe Awards. Winners are listed at the top of each list.

=== Film ===
Best Motion Picture
Drama	Musical or Comedy
The Hours; About Schmidt; Gangs of New York; The Lord of the Rings: The Two Towers; The Pianist	Chicago; About a Boy; Adaptation.; My Big Fat Greek Wedding; Nicholas Nickleby
Best Performance in a Motion Picture – Drama
Actor	Actress
Jack Nicholson – About Schmidt as Warren R. Schmidt; Adrien Brody – The Pianist as Władysław Szpilman; Michael Caine – The Quiet American as Thomas Fowler; Daniel Day-Lewis – Gangs of New York as William "Bill the Butcher" Cutting; Leonardo DiCaprio – Catch Me If You Can as Frank Abagnale, Jr.	Nicole Kidman – The Hours as Virginia Woolf; Salma Hayek – Frida as Frida Kahlo; Diane Lane – Unfaithful as Constance "Connie" Sumner; Julianne Moore – Far From Heaven as Cathy Whitaker; Meryl Streep – The Hours as Clarissa Vaughan
Best Performance in a Motion Picture – Musical or Comedy
Actor	Actress
Richard Gere – Chicago as Billy Flynn; Nicolas Cage – Adaptation. as Charlie Kaufman / Donald Kaufman; Kieran Culkin – Igby Goes Down as Jason "Igby" Slocumb, Jr.; Hugh Grant – About a Boy as Will Freeman; Adam Sandler – Punch-Drunk Love as Barry Egan	Renée Zellweger – Chicago as Roxie Hart; Maggie Gyllenhaal – Secretary as Lee Holloway; Goldie Hawn – The Banger Sisters as Suzette; Nia Vardalos – My Big Fat Greek Wedding as Fotoula "Toula" Portokalos; Catherine Zeta-Jones – Chicago as Velma Kelly
Best Supporting Performance in a Motion Picture – Drama, Musical or Comedy
Supporting Actor	Supporting Actress
Chris Cooper – Adaptation. as John Laroche; Ed Harris – The Hours as Richard "Richie" Brown; Paul Newman – Road to Perdition as John Rooney; Dennis Quaid – Far From Heaven as Frank Whitaker; John C. Reilly – Chicago as Amos Hart	Meryl Streep – Adaptation. as Susan Orlean; Kathy Bates – About Schmidt as Roberta Hertzel; Cameron Diaz – Gangs of New York as Jenny Everdeane; Queen Latifah – Chicago as Matron "Mama" Morton; Susan Sarandon – Igby Goes Down as Mimi Slocumb
Best Director	Best Screenplay
Martin Scorsese – Gangs of New York; Stephen Daldry – The Hours; Peter Jackson – The Lord of the Rings: The Two Towers; Spike Jonze – Adaptation.; Rob Marshall – Chicago; Alexander Payne – About Schmidt	Alexander Payne, Jim Taylor – About Schmidt; Charlie, Donald Kaufman – Adaptation.; Bill Condon – Chicago; Todd Haynes – Far From Heaven; David Hare – The Hours
Best Original Score	Best Original Song
Elliot Goldenthal – Frida; Terence Blanchard – 25th Hour; Elmer Bernstein – Far From Heaven; Philip Glass – The Hours; Peter Gabriel – Rabbit-Proof Fence	"The Hands That Built America" (U2) – Gangs of New York; "Lose Yourself" (Eminem) – 8 Mile; "Die Another Day" (Madonna) – Die Another Day; "Here I Am" (Bryan Adams) – Spirit: Stallion of the Cimarron; "Father and Daughter" (Paul Simon) – The Wild Thornberrys Movie
Best Foreign Language Film	
Talk to Her (Spain); Balzac and the Little Chinese Seamstress (France); City of God (Brazil); The Crime of Father Amaro (Mexico); Hero (China); Nowhere in Africa (Germany)	

The following films received multiple nominations:

Nominations	Film
8	Chicago
7	The Hours
6	Adaptation
5	Gangs of New York
5	About Schmidt
4	Far from Heaven
2	Frida
2	The Lord of the Rings: The Two Towers
2	The Pianist
2	My Big Fat Greek Wedding
2	Igby Goes Down
2	About a Boy

The following films received multiple wins:

Wins	Film
3	Chicago
2	About Schmidt
2	Gangs of New York
2	Adaptation
2	The Hours

=== Television ===
Best Television Series
Drama	Musical or Comedy
The Shield (FX); 24 (Fox); Six Feet Under (HBO); The Sopranos (HBO); The West Wing (NBC)	Curb Your Enthusiasm (HBO); Friends (NBC); Sex and the City (HBO); The Simpsons (Fox); Will & Grace (NBC)
Best Performance in a Television Series – Drama
Actor	Actress
Michael Chiklis – The Shield (FX) as Det. Vic Mackey; James Gandolfini – The Sopranos (HBO) as Tony Soprano; Peter Krause – Six Feet Under (HBO) as Nate Fisher; Martin Sheen – The West Wing (NBC) as Josiah Bartlet; Kiefer Sutherland – 24 (Fox) as Jack Bauer	Edie Falco – The Sopranos (HBO) as Carmela Soprano; Jennifer Garner – Alias (ABC) as Sydney Bristow; Rachel Griffiths – Six Feet Under (HBO) as Brenda Chenowith; Marg Helgenberger – CSI: Crime Scene Investigation (CBS) as Catherine Willows; Allison Janney – The West Wing (NBC) as C. J. Cregg
Best Performance in a Television Series – Musical or Comedy
Actor	Actress
Tony Shalhoub – Monk (USA Network) as Adrian Monk; Larry David – Curb Your Enthusiasm (HBO) as himself; Matt LeBlanc – Friends (NBC) as Joey Tribbiani; Bernie Mac – The Bernie Mac Show (Fox) as Bernie McCullough; Eric McCormack – Will & Grace (NBC) as Will Truman	Jennifer Aniston – Friends (NBC) as Rachel Green; Bonnie Hunt – Life with Bonnie (ABC) as Bonnie Malloy; Jane Kaczmarek – Malcolm in the Middle (Fox) as Lois Wilkerson; Debra Messing – Will & Grace (NBC) as Grace Adler; Sarah Jessica Parker – Sex and the City (HBO) as Carrie Bradshaw
Best Performance in a Miniseries or Television Film
Actor	Actress
Albert Finney – The Gathering Storm (HBO) as Winston Churchill; Michael Gambon – Path to War (HBO) as Lyndon B. Johnson; Michael Keaton – Live from Baghdad (HBO) as Robert Wiener; William H. Macy – Door to Door (TNT) as Bill Porter; Linus Roache – RFK (FX) as Robert F. Kennedy	Uma Thurman – Hysterical Blindness (HBO) as Debby Miller; Helena Bonham Carter – Live from Baghdad (HBO) as Ingrid Formanek; Shirley MacLaine – Hell on Heels: The Battle of Mary Kay (CBS) as Mary Kay Ash; Helen Mirren – Door to Door (TNT) as Mrs. Porter; Vanessa Redgrave – The Gathering Storm (HBO) as Clementine Churchill
Best Supporting Performance in a Series, Miniseries or Television Film
Supporting Actor	Supporting Actress
Donald Sutherland – Path to War (HBO) as Clark Clifford; Alec Baldwin – Path to War (HBO) as Robert McNamara; Jim Broadbent – The Gathering Storm (HBO) as Desmond Morton; Bryan Cranston – Malcolm in the Middle (Fox) as Hal Wilkerson; Sean Hayes – Will & Grace (NBC) as Jack McFarland; Dennis Haysbert – 24 (Fox) as David Palmer; Michael Imperioli – The Sopranos (HBO) as Christopher Moltisanti; John Spencer – The West Wing (NBC) as Leo McGarry; Bradley Whitford – The West Wing (NBC) as Josh Lyman	Kim Cattrall – Sex and the City (HBO) as Samantha Jones; Megan Mullally – Will & Grace (NBC) as Karen Walker; Cynthia Nixon – Sex and the City (HBO) as Miranda Hobbes; Parker Posey – Hell on Heels: The Battle of Mary Kay (CBS) as Jinger Heath; Gena Rowlands – Hysterical Blindness (HBO) as Virginia Miller
Miniseries or Television Film
The Gathering Storm (HBO); Live from Baghdad (HBO); Path to War (HBO); Shackleton (A&E); Taken (Sci-Fi Channel)

The following programs received multiple nominations:

Nominations	Title
5	The West Wing
5	Will & Grace
4	Path to War
4	Sex and the City
4	The Sopranos
3	24
3	Friends
3	The Gathering Storm
3	Live from Baghdad
3	Six Feet Under
2	Curb Your Enthusiasm
2	Door to Door
2	Hell on Heels: The Battle of Mary Kay
2	Hysterical Blindness
2	Malcolm in the Middle
2	The Shield

The following films and programs received multiple wins:

Wins	Title
2	The Gathering Storm
2	The Shield

== Ceremony ==
=== Presenters ===
- Tim Allen
- Simon Baker
- Annette Bening
- Halle Berry
- Beyoncé Knowles
- Cate Blanchett
- Bono
- Lara Flynn Boyle
- Carol Burnett
- Michael Caine
- Jennifer Connelly
- Kristin Davis
- Faye Dunaway
- Colin Farrell
- Calista Flockhart
- Harrison Ford
- Brendan Fraser
- Jennifer Garner
- Jeff Goldblum
- Kelsey Grammer
- Hugh Grant
- Salma Hayek
- Jill Hennessy
- Samuel L. Jackson
- Elton John
- Nicole Kidman
- Jude Law
- Heath Ledger
- Laura Linney
- Ray Liotta
- Sarah Jessica Parker
- Brad Pitt
- Sam Rockwell
- Arnold Schwarzenegger
- Sharon Stone
- Kiefer Sutherland
- Marisa Tomei
- Paul Walker
- Sigourney Weaver
- Robin Williams
- Renée Zellweger

=== Cecil B. DeMille Award ===
Gene Hackman

=== Mr. Golden Globe ===
A.J. Lamas (son of Lorenzo Lamas & Michele Smith)

=== Miss Golden Globe ===
Dominik Garcia (daughter of Andy Garcia & Marivi Lorido Garcia)

== Awards breakdown ==
The following networks received multiple nominations:

Nominations	Network
21	HBO
13	NBC
7	Fox
4	USA
3	CBS
3	FX
2	ABC
2	TNT

The following networks received multiple wins:

Wins	Networks
2	FX
2	USA

== See also ==
- 75th Academy Awards
- 23rd Golden Raspberry Awards
- 9th Screen Actors Guild Awards
- 54th Primetime Emmy Awards
- 55th Primetime Emmy Awards
- 56th British Academy Film Awards
- 57th Tony Awards
- 2002 in film
- 2002 in American television
