= Broadcast Film Critics Association Awards 2002 =

Broadcast Film Critics Association Awards 2002 may refer to:

- 7th Critics' Choice Awards, the seventh Critics' Choice Awards ceremony that took place in 2002
- 8th Critics' Choice Awards, the eighth Critics' Choice Awards ceremony that took place in 2003 and which honored the best in film for 2002
