= Broadcast Film Critics Association Awards 2003 =

Broadcast Film Critics Association Awards 2003 may refer to:

- 8th Critics' Choice Awards, the eighth Critics' Choice Awards ceremony that took place in 2003
- 9th Critics' Choice Awards, the ninth Critics' Choice Awards ceremony that took place in 2004 and which honored the best in film for 2003
