= Watkins Incorporated =

- J. R. Watkins Medical Company Complex
- U.S. National Register of Historic Places
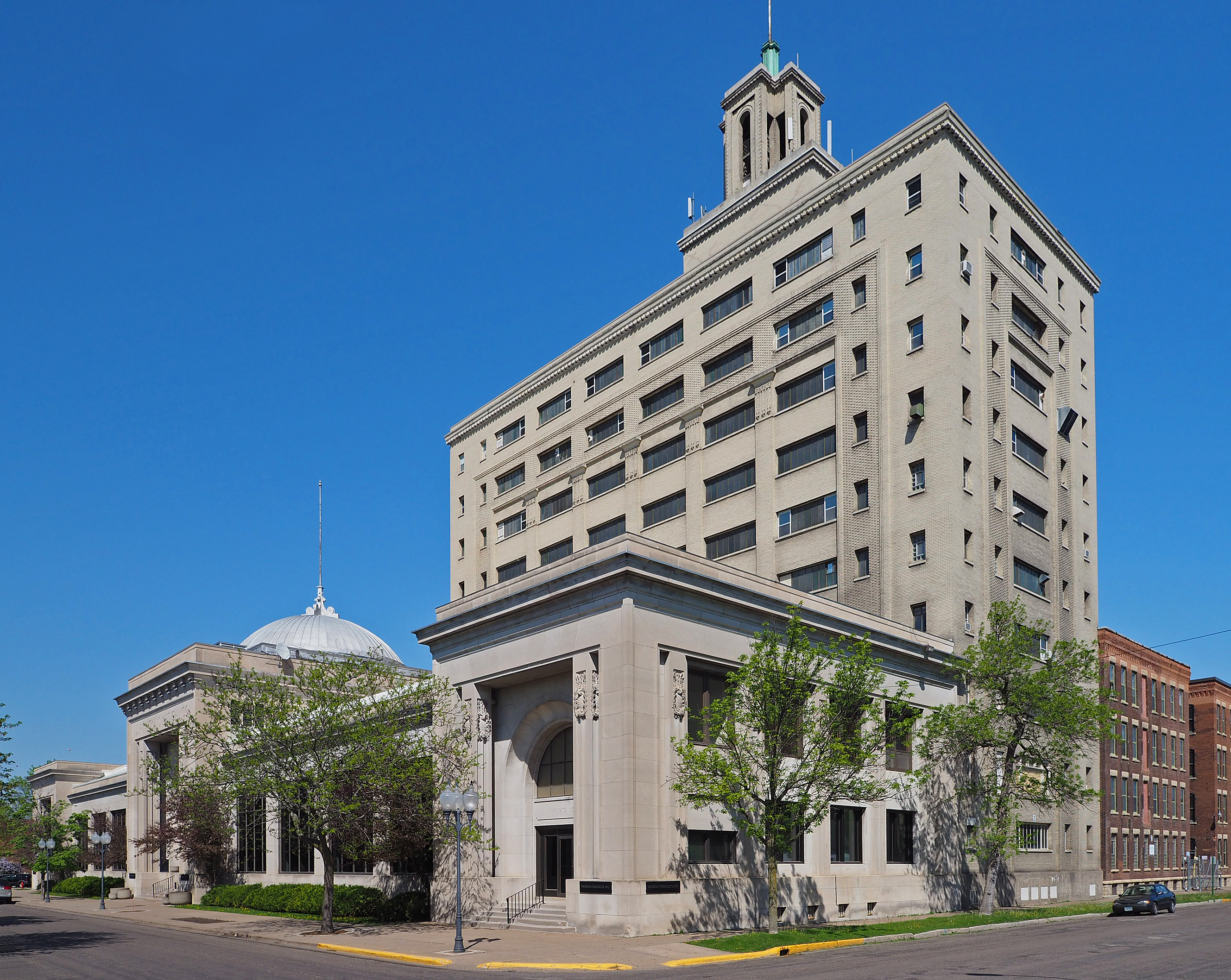
- The J. R. Watkins Headquarters from the southwest

- Location within Minnesota Location within the United States
- Location: 150 Liberty Street, Winona, Minnesota
- Coordinates: 44°2′58″N 91°37′41″W
- Area: 2.5 acres (1.0 ha)
- Built: 1900–1914
- Architect: George W. Maher
- Architectural style: Prairie School (1911 Administration Building)
- NRHP reference No.: 84003940
- Added to NRHP: December 4, 2004

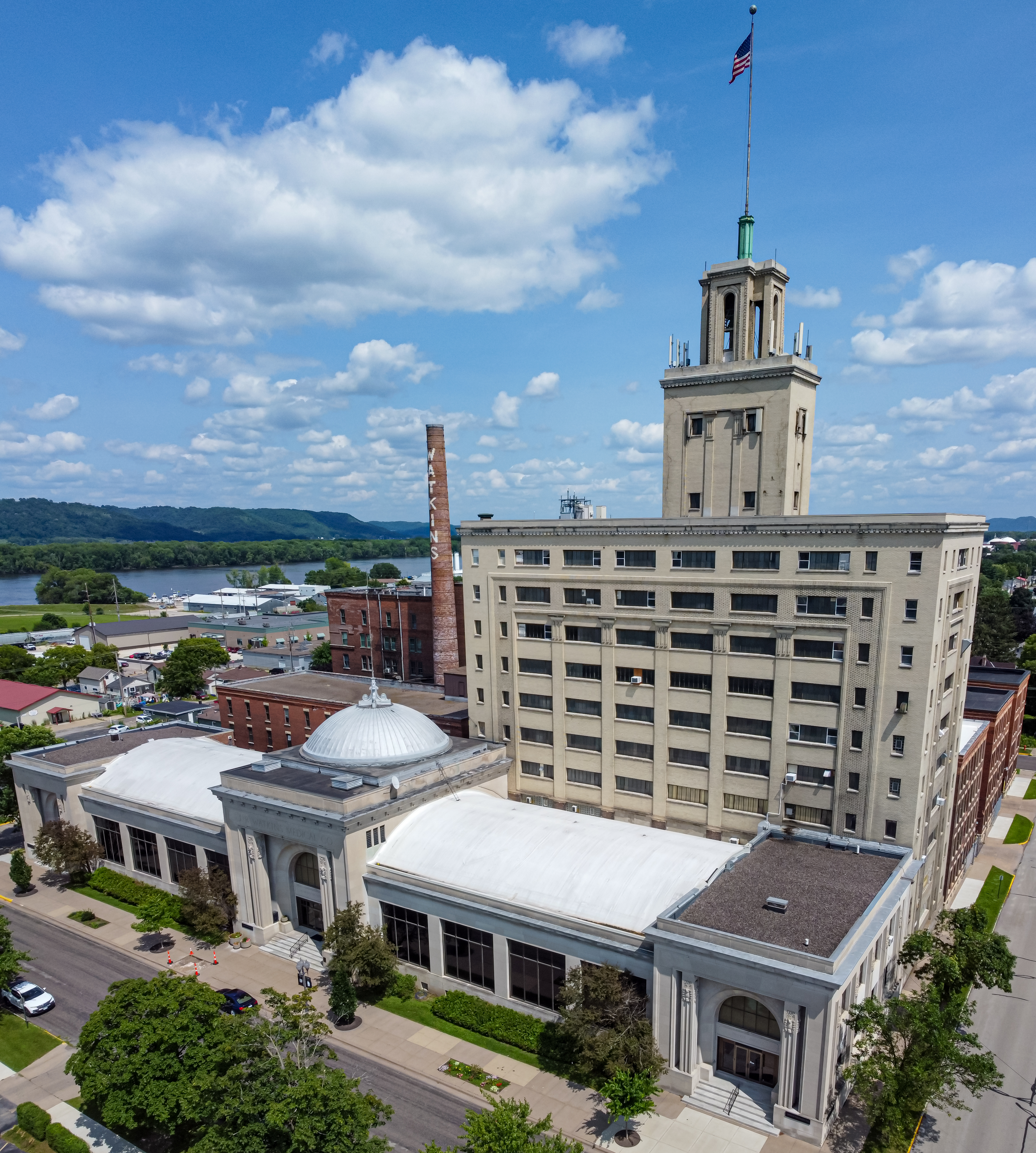

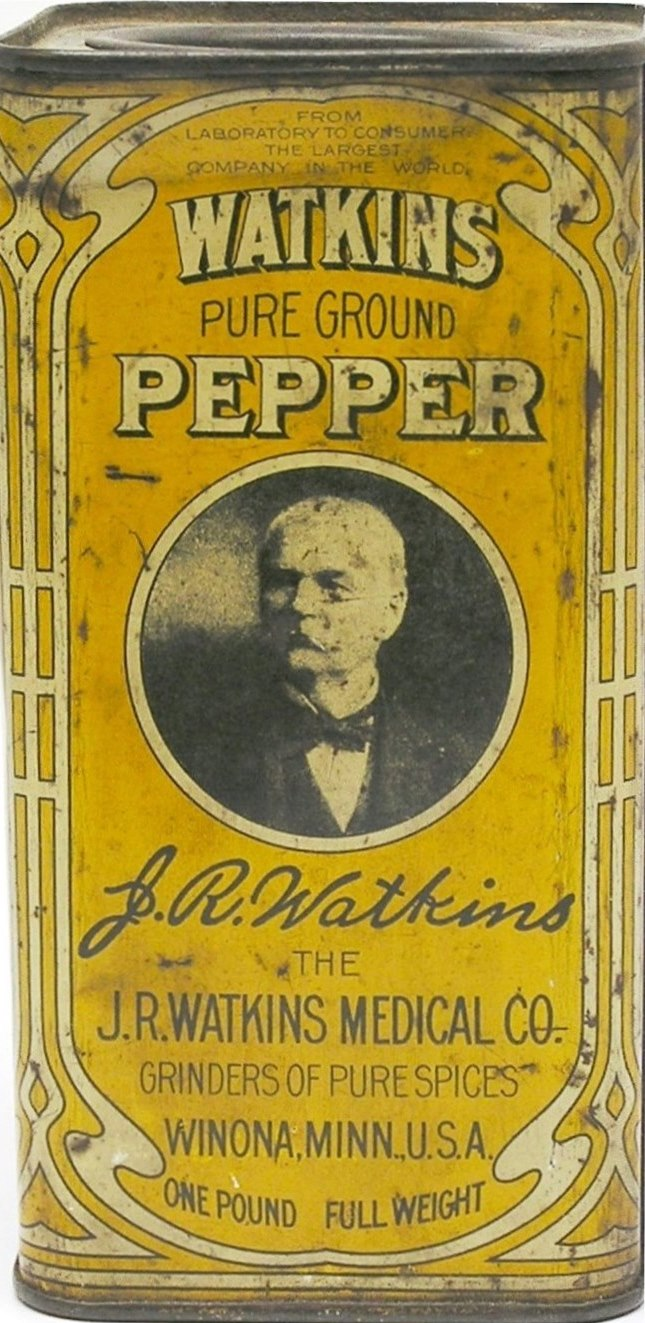
Watkins Pepper – J.R. Watkins, Winona, Minnesota

Watkins Incorporated is a manufacturer of health remedies, baking products, and other household items. Founded in 1868, Watkins Incorporated is based in Winona, Minnesota, United States, which utilizes an omnichannel marketing strategy which includes a national retail sales force that focuses on selling to the retail channel as well as an independent sales force of 25,000 people to distribute its products.

== History ==
The company was founded by J. R. Watkins in Plainview, Minnesota, who began selling liniment in 1868 door-to-door in the southeastern part of the state. A year after J.R. Watkins began selling liniment, he introduced the trial-mark bottle. Molded into the glass bottle, about one-third of the way down, was a mark that showed how much of the product a customer could use and still get a refund. A label with the statement, “If not fully satisfied, your money cheerfully refunded,” also appeared on the bottle. The Watkins trial-mark is believed to be the first money-back guarantee in the United States.

The company moved to Winona in 1885 and added several products to its lineup. Baking materials including pepper and vanilla extract were added in 1895 along with cinnamon, ginger, cloves, peppermint extract and lemon extract. Between 1889 and 1914, Watkins constructed six manufacturing buildings behind the Winona Administration Building. J.R. Watkins died in 1911. In 1914, a prominent ten-story building completed the look of the Administration Building. Maher's Administration Building included a
70-foot high rotunda dome coated in 24-carat gold leaf, a blue Bedford stone façade, 224 stained glass skylights and three custom-made Tiffany stained glass windows.

During World War II, Watkins devoted 90% of its production capacity to support the Allied war effort. To fill government contracts, Watkins produced dried eggs, powdered juice packets, vitamin tablets, hospital germicide, DDT and insecticide powder.

In the 1940s, Watkins was the largest direct-sales company in the world, but soon began to decline. The demographics and buying habits of the United States had major shifts in the following decades, and the company did not keep pace. Watkins filed for bankruptcy protection in the 1970s and was purchased by Minneapolis investor Irwin L. Jacobs in 1978.

In 1996, Jacobs' son, Mark Evan Jacobs, began to take over day-to-day operations. He was 14 when his father bought the company, and had worked as a Watkins salesman for many years. Mark was an aspiring actor, appearing in minor roles in films such as Biloxi Blues and Goodfellas, but he realized his acting career wasn't advancing. Since taking over the company, he has controlled spending and introduced an enhanced compensation plan for sales associates. He also spearheaded an extensive brand study that led to the introduction of Watkins products onto store shelves.

The seven-building Watkins headquarters in Winona is on the National Register of Historic Places as the J.R. Watkins Medical Company Complex. In 2004, the complex was cited as having national significance related to architecture, commerce, and industry. It was nominated for being the long-time headquarters of the nation's largest direct sales company in the early 20th century, and for the Prairie School design of its 1911 Administration Building by architect George W. Maher. The front entrance includes a window designed by stained-glass artist Louis J. Millet depicting Sugar Loaf, a local landmark.

In 2002, the story of a Watkins salesman, Bill Porter, was dramatized in the 2002 Emmy award-winning TNT movie Door to Door. Porter had a 50-year career with Watkins in Portland, Oregon, and worked a route despite having cerebral palsy. Porter was also featured in news stories.

In 2017, the Watkins Company sold its home care, personal care and over-the-counter remedies product lines to Swander Pace Capital. The newly formed sister company, J.R. Watkins Brands, focuses solely on home care, personal care and over-the-counter remedies.

In September 2018, Watkins set a Guinness World Record for the greatest number of layers in a layer cake. The record-breaking confection was a 6' 1" Lady Baltimore cake with 260 layers, exceeding the previous record by 30 layers. Ingredients included 900 eggs, 480 pounds of sugar, 150 pounds of flour, 102 pounds of shortening, 45 pounds of butter, 32 pounds of oil, 45 pounds of milk, 30 pounds of water, 2.5 pounds of salt, and 7 pounds of Watkins All Natural Baking Vanilla Extract. Watkins commissioned Wuollet Bakery in Minneapolis to create the cake, and the record-breaking event took place at Watkins headquarters during the company's 150th anniversary celebration.

== See also ==
- National Register of Historic Places listings in Winona County, Minnesota
