= Joseph Ray Watkins =

American entrepreneur

J. R. Watkins
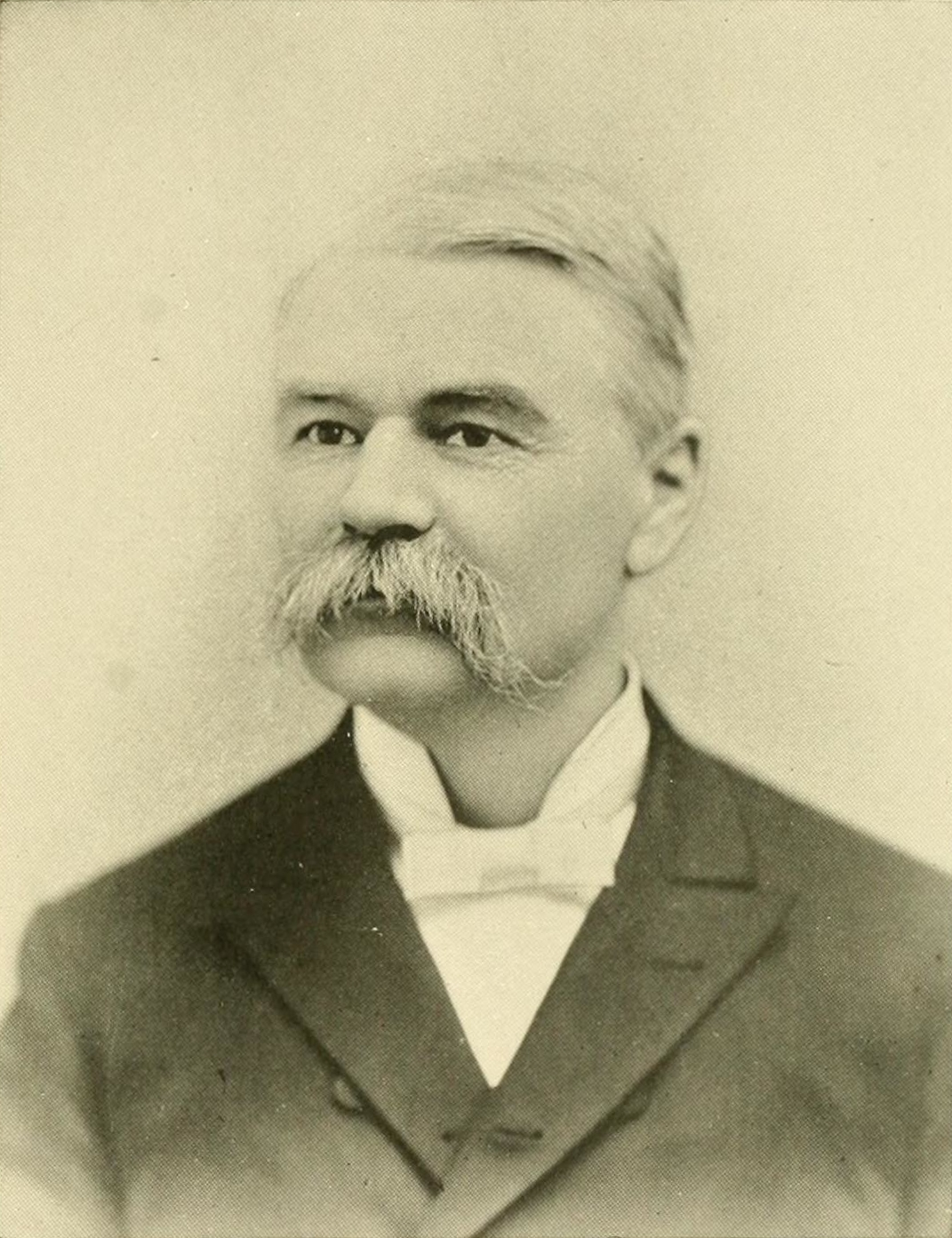
- Watkins, c. 1900
- Born: Joseph Ray Watkins; August 21, 1840; Cincinnati, U.S.
- Died: December 21, 1911 (aged 71); Jamaica
- Occupation: medicine manufacturer

Signature
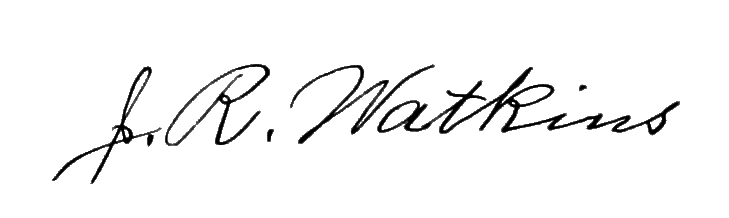

Joseph Ray Watkins (August 21, 1840 – December 21, 1911) was an American entrepreneur and founder of Watkins Incorporated with his homemade medical products – liniment, extracts, and salves. He offered the United States's first money back guarantee for his products and is credited as the founder of the direct sales industry.

== Family genealogy ==
The American Watkins are of Welsh descent that settled in New Jersey in the latter part of the seventeenth century. Watkins' great-grandfather was born in New Jersey in the early 18th-century and during the American Revolutionary War had contracts for furnishing food to the Continental Army. His grandfather was also from New Jersey; in 1800 he migrated to Ohio and settled at Fort Washington, where the city of Cincinnati developed.

== Early life ==
Joseph Ray Watkins was the second son and third child of Reverend Benjamin Utter Watkins and Sophronia (Keeler) Watkins. He was born in Cincinnati on August 21, 1840. Joseph and his older brother were educated at the local public schools. Watkins' father sold their homestead in 1862 and moved the family to Minnesota. They settled at Maine Prairie in Stearns County.

Watkins became a friend of one William Fox in 1864 when Fox was visiting Stearns County for health reasons. Fox was originally from Cadiz, Ohio. Watkins went back with Fox to Cadiz in 1867 on the idea of obtaining some dried fruit that he would take back home. In Cadiz, Watkins met his future wife, then-22-year-old Mary Ellen Heberling, with whom he communicated by letters over the next year after he returned to Minnesota. Watkins came back to Cadiz in August 1868 to retrieve Mary Ellen. He returned to Minnesota with her after they married on September 10, 1868.

== Career ==
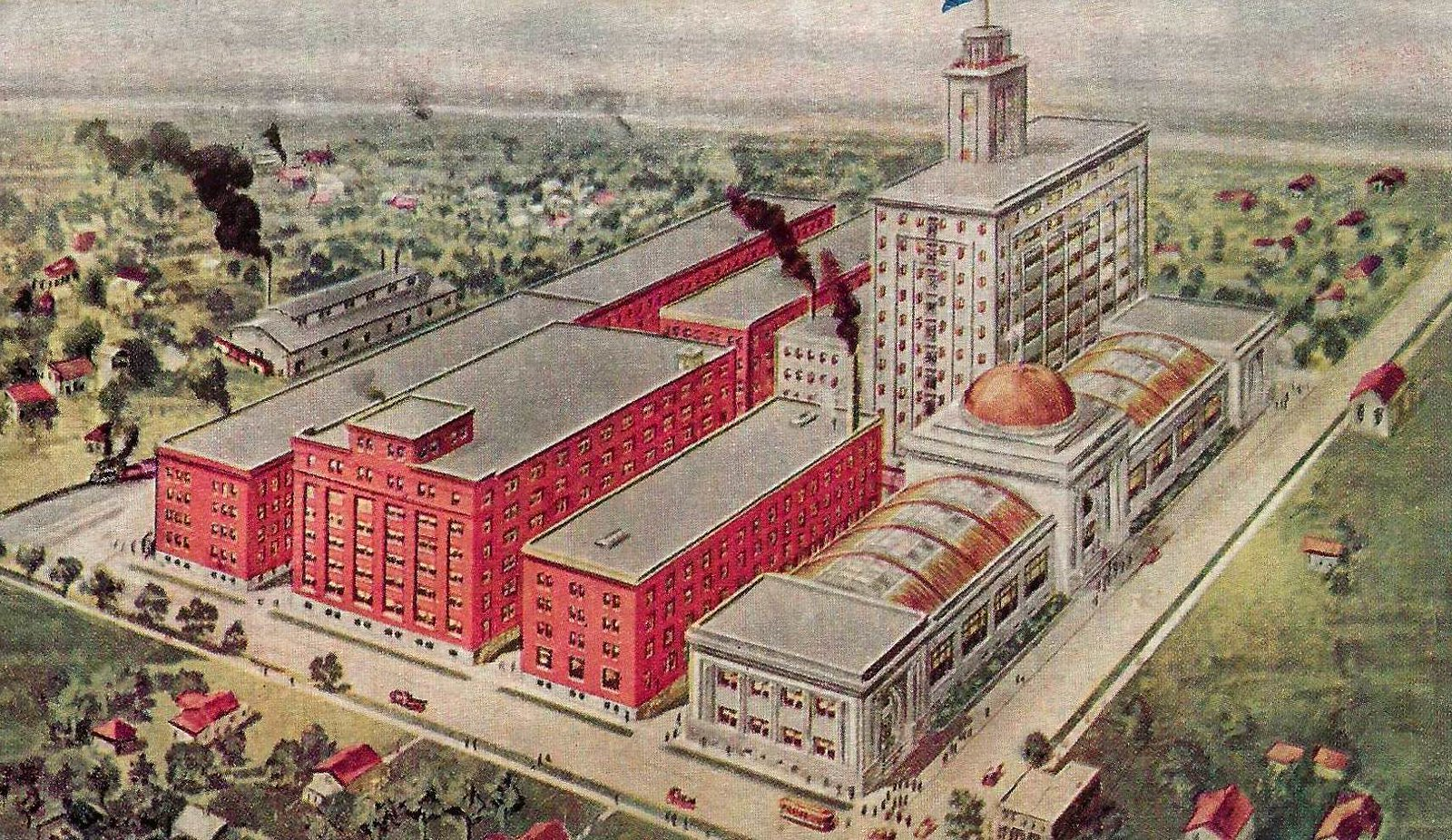
J.R. Watkins Medical Company, c. 1915

Watkins passed through Harrison, Ohio, on the way to Cadiz to retrieve his new bride. There he met one Dr. Richard Ward, the manufacturer of a popular vegetable anodyne liniment for relieving muscle pain. This medicine was well known in Minnesota already through the sales franchise of J. H. Sands established in 1856. Watkins had an interest in the product and negotiated a franchise of his own from Dr. Ward.

Watkins had a special buggy sales wagon made in St Cloud, Minnesota. It was a large wooden-covered wagon with compartments and a high seat in front. It cost five hundred dollars with the horses. Watkins started to experiment with making the red liniment at his home in Plainview, Minnesota in 1868. He personally bottled the home-made medicine of Asian camphor and red pepper extract and sold it to the public. This became the founding of J. R. Watkins Medical Company.

Watkins sold his product directly to the local farmers and villagers, being credited as the founder of the direct sales industry. Watkins at first pushed a cart as a one-man operation. Later he peddled his business with a horse and buggy sales wagon filled with products, developing a 100-mile (160 km) sales territory around his hometown. The direct door-to-door business was so successful that he brought in other wagon salesmen who sold throughout Minnesota and eventually to other states.

Watkins built his business on customer satisfaction and extended the first money back guarantee in the country for his product. He had a "trial mark" molded onto each bottle – positioned about one-third of the way down – and promised customers that if they hadn't used the product below that point, they would receive a full refund if they were unsatisfied. Watkins moved his business to Winona, Minnesota in 1885. There it was easier to obtain the materials for his medical products. He rented a four-room house and used half for manufacture of his home remedy medical products – liniment, extracts, and salves. These products were purchased by lumbermen for relief of sore muscles from working all day in a sawmill.

After establishing in Winona, Watkins expanded into publishing in 1898 with The Morning Independent, a Democratic rival to the Winona Daily Republican. Watkins sold the paper to Horace G. White and Frank J. Rucker in 1902, which was later sold to the Winona Republican-Herald in 1919.

== Family ==
Watkins and his wife, Mary Ellen, had two children while living in Plainview. Their eldest, a son, died at 14 months of age. Their second child, Grace, was born in 1875. Grace was a respected marksman and avid hunter, having been trained by Annie Oakley, and at one time held the women's trap shooting record of 186 consecutive targets. She married typewriter salesman Ernest L. King, who eventually became president of Watkins Incorporated.

== Later life and death ==
Watkins' wife died in 1904, which was the same year his daughter married. He then married his son-in-law's mother in September 1911, but he died in Jamaica three months later.

== Bibliography ==
- Arcadia (2004). Watkins. Arcadia Publishing. ISBN 978-0-7385-3310-0.
- Ehrlick, Darrell (2008). It Happened in Minnesota. TwoDot. p. 40. ISBN 978-1-4617-4731-4.
- Frost, Julia Watkins (1913). Annals of Our Ancestors - 150 Years of History in the Watkins Family. FB&C Limited. ISBN 978-1-3335-1788-5.
- Higginson (1900). Encyclopedia Biography of Minnesota. Higginson Book Company.
- McCann, Dennis (2017). This Storied River. Wisconsin Historical Society Press. ISBN 978-0-87020-785-3. "Watkins began working out of his home in 1868 and gained prominence by offering America's first money-back guarantee for unhappy customers."
- Whipple, William Jay (1998). History of Winona County, MN. Brookhaven Press. ISBN 9781581030969.
- Williams, Robert Jr and Helena (2017). Vintage Marketing. Palgrave Macmillan US. ISBN 978-1-137-38721-9. "Watkins introduced the first Trial-Mark bottle in 1869, which became America's first money-back guarantee."
