= Door to Door (film) =

2002 made for TV film

- Genre: Drama
- Based on: Life of Bill Porter
- Written by: William H. Macy; Steven Schachter
- Directed by: Steven Schachter
- Starring: William H. Macy; Kyra Sedgwick; Helen Mirren; Michael Shanks; Kathy Baker
- Music by: Jeff Beal
- Country of origin: United States
- Original language: English

Production
- Executive producers: Dan Angel; Billy Brown; David A. Rosemont
- Producer: Warren Carr
- Cinematography: Jan Kiesser
- Editor: Paul Dixon
- Running time: 90 minutes

Original release
- Network: TNT
- Release: July 14, 2002

Door to Door is a 2002 American biographical drama television film about Bill Porter, an inspiring and successful door-to-door salesman with cerebral palsy. The film stars William H. Macy, who plays Porter, and also features Helen Mirren, Kyra Sedgwick, Michael Shanks, and Kathy Baker. Door to Door, directed by Steven Schachter, was produced for the TNT cable network. The script was co-written by Macy, and Forest Whitaker served as an executive producer. It was the first film made under the J&J Spotlight series banner, a partnership between TNT and Johnson & Johnson. The film premiered on TNT on July 14, 2002.

Porter had been told for many years that he was not employable, but he was determined to succeed and focused his efforts on working as a salesman for Watkins. Despite the awkwardness and pain of his condition, he would walk eight to ten miles a day to meet his customers. Porter supported himself, and continued to work as a salesman until age 69.

Door to Door was nominated for twelve Emmy Awards and won six, including Outstanding Made for Television Movie and Outstanding Lead Actor in a Miniseries or Movie (William H. Macy). It also won a Peabody Award.

== Plot ==
Bill Porter has been living with cerebral palsy since birth. As an adult, he takes it upon himself to seek employment but is met with rejection at various jobs. With the encouragement of his supportive mother Irene, Bill applies for a job as a door-to-door salesman for Watkins, a supplier of household items and baking products. At first, his overtures for the job are brushed off, but Bill's offer to take the least profitable route and work only for commissions convinces the hiring manager to give him a position. Bill's first day on the job gets off to a rocky start, as his route seems to be filled with surly would-be customers who are unwelcoming or uncomfortable with Bill's condition.

After the first few days of slammed doors and awkward interactions, Bill begins to doubt whether he is right for the job. Irene inspires him to not lose hope with a sandwich (which has the words patience and persistence written in ketchup on each respective side), and he works on improving his sales pitch. Soon, doors that were once slammed on Bill begin to stay open, and he is able to turn some customers into friends. Bill's customers include Gladys, a lonely widow who takes pity on Bill and gives him his first sale. He becomes acquainted with squabbling neighbors and a gay couple. Bill's supervisors also take notice of his job performance in the difficult sales territory and begin to support his efforts to grow his new job into a successful career.

Bill faces hardships when his mother is diagnosed with Alzheimer's disease. A Mormon couple wants to help Bill out, but his pride prevents him from accepting. To help with deliveries, Bill is forced to hire college student Shelly, who becomes a lifelong friend and confidante.

After some years, Irene passes away from her condition, and Bill is awarded Salesman of the Year by his company.

== Cast ==
- William H. Macy as Bill Porter
- Kyra Sedgwick as Shelly Soomky Brady
- Helen Mirren as Irene Porter
- Kathy Baker as Gladys Sullivan
- Joel Brooks as Alan
- Woody Jeffreys as Brad
- Nancy Lenehan
- Romy Rosemont as Rhoda
- Eric Keenleyside as Neighbor Bob
- Daryl Shuttleworth as Larry
- Bill Dow as Chuck
- Michael Shanks as John
- Michael P. Northey as Go Away Guy
- Laurie Murdoch as Older Joey
- Alvin Sanders as Shoeshine Guy
- Christina Jastrzembska as Mrs. Kolatrenko
- Mary Black as Mrs. Warren
- Greg Kean as Clark
- L. Harvey Gold as Man in Traction
- Fred Keating as Doctor
- Lorena Gale as Hospital Administrator
- Kevin McNulty as President of Watkins
- David James Lewis as Peter Schaefer
- Mary B. McCann as Gladys' Daughter in law
- Robert Moloney as Gladys' son
- Jesse Moss as Watkins Stock Boy
- Candus Churchill as Diner Waitress
- Sean Tyler Foley as Diner Teenage Boy
- Melanie Merkosky as Diner Teenage Girl
- Linden Banks as Minister
- Deryl Hayes as Policeman
- Ginger Page as Kim
- Alf Humphreys as Man in Car
- Larry Musser as Other Salesman
- Brittany Tiplady as Katrina
- Bill Mackenzie as Security guard
- Brenda Crichlow as Watkins Secretary
- Gardiner Millar as Cop
- Jocelyne Loewen as Woman with Larry
- Felicity Huffman as Joey's mom (uncredited)

== Critical reception ==
The cast of Door to Door received widespread praise. Michael Speier of Variety gave a mixed review where he wrote, "TNT's 'Door to Door' has all the earmarks of a message film, but no message." He added that "presenting the condition [of cerebral palsy] as if it's a mere hindrance rather than something that can entail a lifetime of medical care…doesn't do as much justice to the cause of disabled individuals as it wants to." He concluded: "But Macy's perf does shine. Heavily made up and wafer-thin, with speech slurred, back arched and ears protruding, he transforms cleanly into the man. It's the supporting cast, full of notable actors, that doesn't quite gel with the material. Mirren is awfully underused as the doting and determined mother who becomes hospitalized, Sedgwick is her chipper self in a part that doesn't require much depth and Baker plays her potentially profound role rather straight."

Carla Meyer of the San Francisco Chronicle praised Macy and Mirren and the film "is one of those triumph-of-the-human-spirit TV movies, with hankies mandatory. But it's hardly ever hokey." One of her criticisms was when the film "hits the '90s and focuses on Bill's resistance to the information age. This emphasis does a disservice to a man who's shown a remarkable ability to adapt -- to living with a disability, to a demanding job, to heartache."

== Awards and nominations ==
Award	Category	Nominee(s)	Result	Ref.
Critics' Choice Awards	Best Picture Made for Television		Won	
Golden Globe Awards	Best Actress in a Miniseries or a Motion Picture Made for Television	Helen Mirren	Nominated	
Golden Globe Awards	Best Actor in a Miniseries or a Motion Picture Made for Television	William H. Macy	Nominated	
Online Film & Television Association Awards	Best Motion Picture Made for Television		Won	
Online Film & Television Association Awards	Best Actor in a Motion Picture or Miniseries	William H. Macy	Nominated	
Online Film & Television Association Awards	Best Supporting Actress in a Motion Picture or Miniseries	Helen Mirren	Nominated	
Online Film & Television Association Awards	Best Ensemble in a Motion Picture or Miniseries		Nominated	
Online Film & Television Association Awards	Best Direction of a Motion Picture or Miniseries	Steven Schachter	Nominated	
Online Film & Television Association Awards	Best Writing of a Motion Picture or Miniseries	William H. Macy, Steven Schacter	Nominated	
Online Film & Television Association Awards	Best Makeup/Hairstyling in a Motion Picture or Miniseries		Nominated	
Peabody Award		Turner Network Television, Rosemont Productions International Ltd., Angel Brown Productions, in association with Spirit Dance Productions	Won	
Primetime Emmy Awards	Outstanding Casting for a Miniseries, Movie or a Special	Juel Bestrop, Jeanne McCarthy, Candice Elzinga, Bette Chadwick	Nominated	
Primetime Emmy Awards	Outstanding Cinematography for a Miniseries or a Movie	Jan Kiesser	Nominated	
Primetime Emmy Awards	Outstanding Directing for a Miniseries, Movie or a Dramatic Special	Steven Schachter	Won	
Primetime Emmy Awards	Outstanding Single Camera Picture Editing for a Miniseries, Movie or a Special	Paul Dixon	Nominated	
Primetime Emmy Awards	Outstanding Hairstyling for a Miniseries, Movie or a Special	Julie McHaffie	Won	
Primetime Emmy Awards	Outstanding Makeup for a Miniseries, Movie or a Special (Prosthetic)	Matthew W. Mungle, Charles Porlier, Jayne Dancose	Won	
Primetime Emmy Awards	Outstanding Lead Actor in a Miniseries or a Movie	William H. Macy	Won	
Primetime Emmy Awards	Outstanding Supporting Actress in a Miniseries or a Movie	Kathy Baker	Nominated	
Primetime Emmy Awards	Outstanding Supporting Actress in a Miniseries or a Movie	Helen Mirren	Nominated	
Primetime Emmy Awards	Outstanding Made for Television Movie	David A. Rosemont, Dan Angel, Billy Brown, Forest Whitaker, Robert J. King, Warren Carr	Won	
Primetime Emmy Awards	Outstanding Single Camera Sound Mixing for a Miniseries or a Movie	Randy Kiss, Geoff Turner, Perry Leigh Fifield, Martin Fossum	Nominated	
Primetime Emmy Awards	Outstanding Writing for a Miniseries, Movie or a Dramatic Special	William H. Macy, Steven Schachter	Won	
Satellite Awards	Best Motion Picture Made for Television		Won	
Satellite Awards	Best Actor in a Miniseries or a Motion Picture Made for Television	William H. Macy	Won	
Satellite Awards	Best Actress in a Supporting Role in a Miniseries or a Motion Picture Made for Television	Helen Mirren	Won	
Screen Actors Guild Awards	Outstanding Performance by a Male Actor in a Television Movie or Miniseries	William H. Macy	Won	
Screen Actors Guild Awards	Outstanding Performance by a Female Actor in a Television Movie or Miniseries	Helen Mirren	Nominated	

== Adaptations ==
DOOR TO DOOR is also the name of a 2009 Japanese TV movie by TBS, starring Kazunari Ninomiya, which is set in Japan and loosely based on the Bill Porter story. For his performance in this drama and Ryūsei no Kizuna, Ninomiya won the Individual Award at the 46th Galaxy Award.
