= 9th Screen Actors Guild Awards =

- Awarded for: Outstanding motion picture and primetime television performances
- Date: March 9, 2003
- Location: Shrine Auditorium; Los Angeles, California
- Country: United States
- Presented by: Screen Actors Guild
- Website: www.sagawards.org

Television/radio coverage
- Network: TNT

The 9th Screen Actors Guild Awards, awarded by the Screen Actors Guild and honoring the best achievements in film and television performances for the year 2002, took place on March 9, 2003. The ceremony was held at the Shrine Exposition Center in Los Angeles, California, and was televised live by TNT.

The nominees were announced on January 28, 2003, by Megan Mullally and Michael Clarke Duncan at Los Angeles' Skirball Cultural Center's Magnin Auditorium.

== Winners and nominees ==
Winners are listed first and highlighted in boldface.

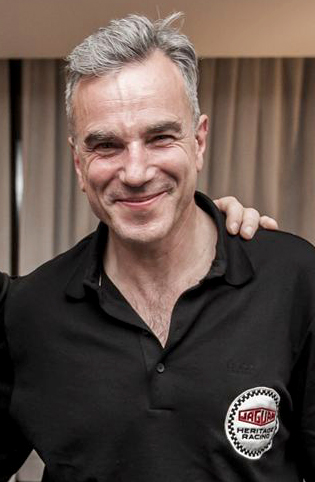
Daniel Day-Lewis, Outstanding Performance by a Male Actor in a Leading Role winner

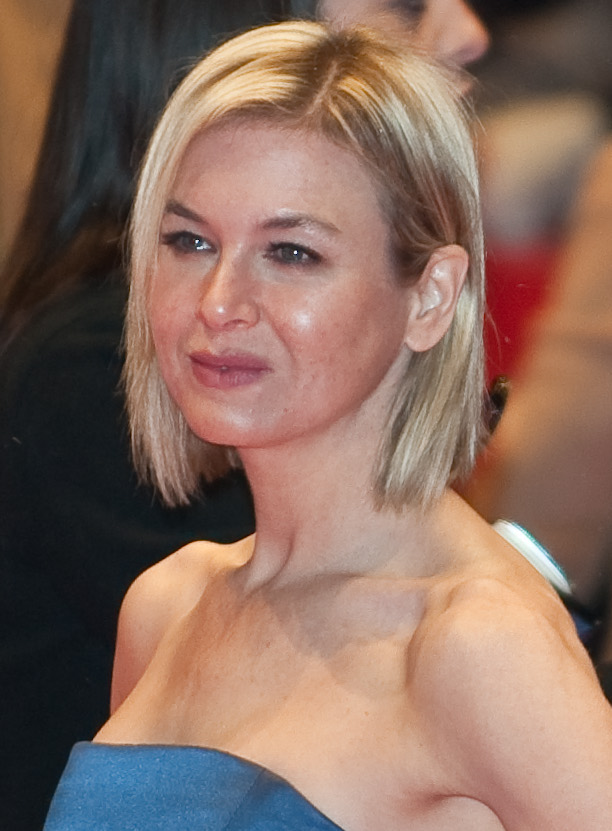
Renée Zellweger, Outstanding Performance by a Female Actor in a Leading Role winner

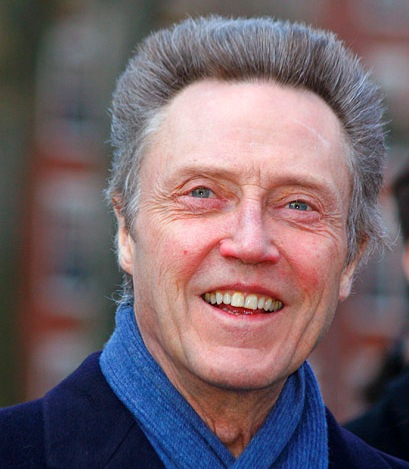
Christopher Walken, Outstanding Performance by a Male Actor in a Supporting Role winner

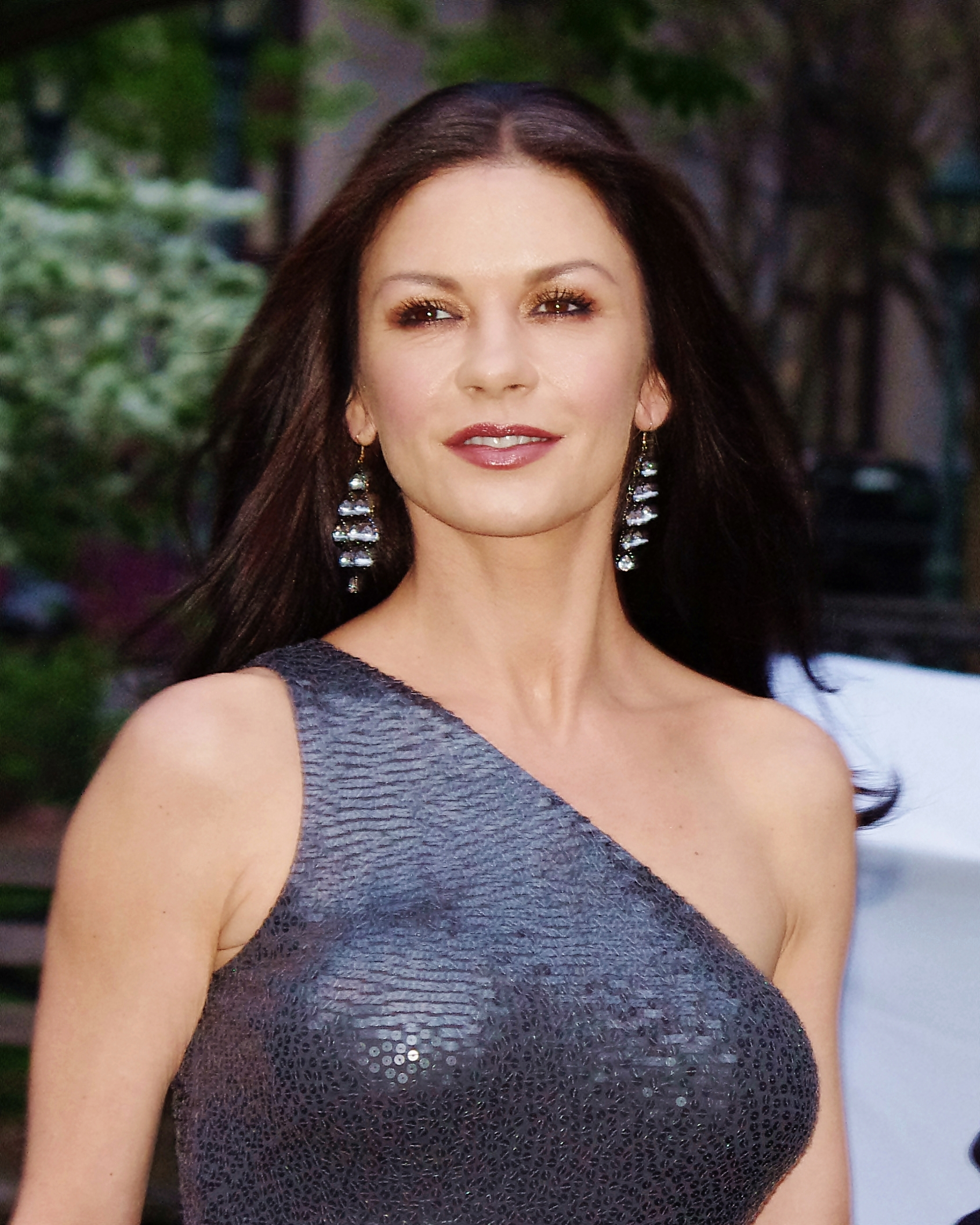
Catherine Zeta-Jones, Outstanding Performance by a Female Actor in a Supporting Role winner

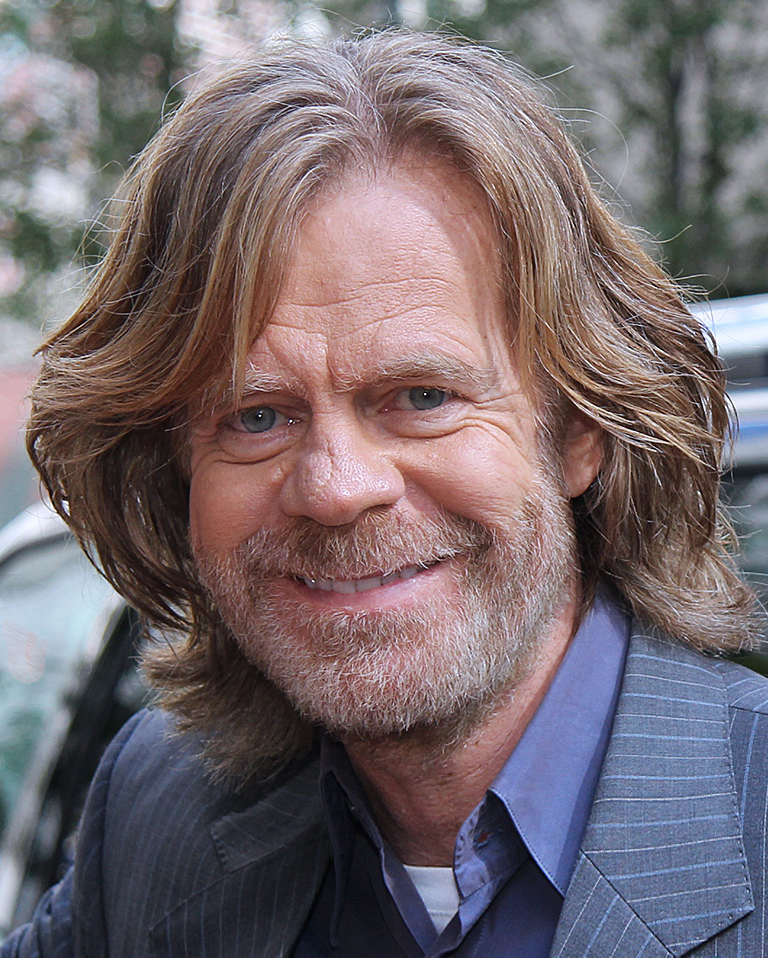
William H. Macy, Outstanding Performance by a Male Actor in a Miniseries or Television Movie winner

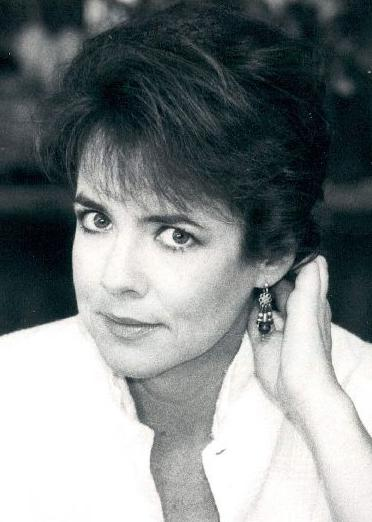
Stockard Channing, Outstanding Performance by a Female Actor in a Miniseries or Television Movie winner

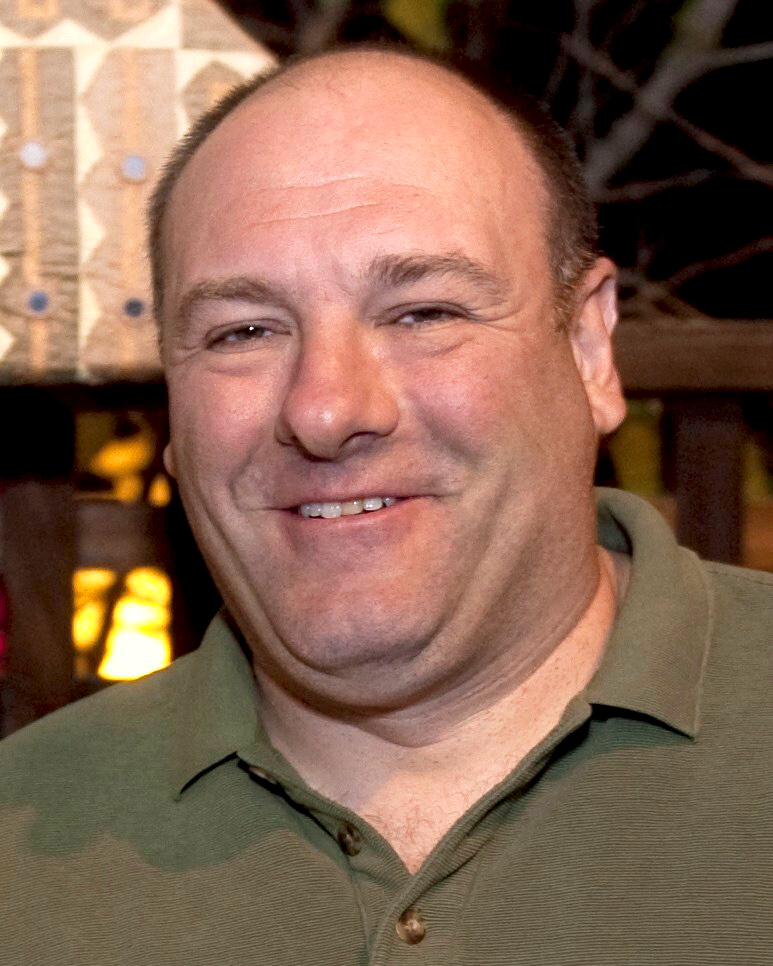
James Gandolfini, Outstanding Performance by a Male Actor in a Drama Series winner

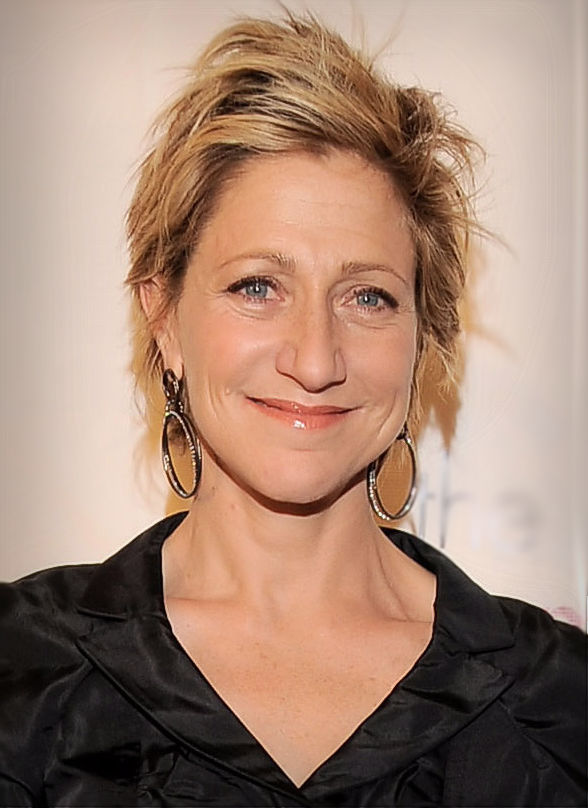
Edie Falco, Outstanding Performance by a Female Actor in a Drama Series winner

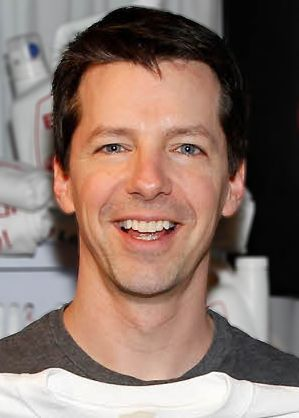
Sean Hayes, Outstanding Performance by a Male Actor in a Comedy Series winner

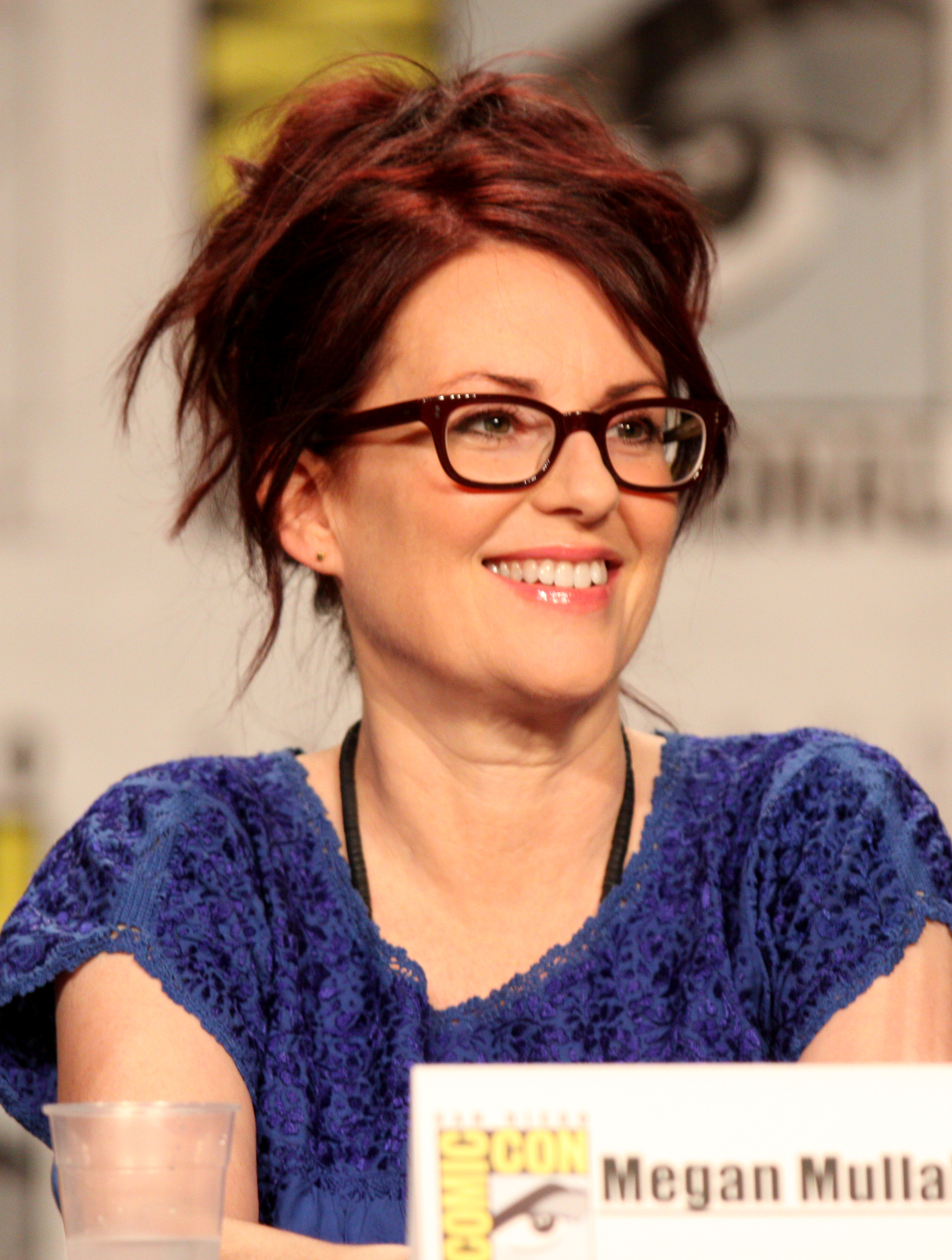
Megan Mullally, Outstanding Performance by a Female Actor in a Comedy Series winner

=== Film ===
Outstanding Performance by a Male Actor in a Leading Role	Outstanding Performance by a Female Actor in a Leading Role
**Daniel Day-Lewis – Gangs of New York as William "Bill the Butcher" Cutting**; Adrien Brody – The Pianist as Władysław "Wladek" Szpilman; Nicolas Cage – Adaptation as Charlie Kaufman / Donald Kaufman; Richard Gere – Chicago as Billy Flynn; Jack Nicholson – About Schmidt as Warren Schmidt	**Renée Zellweger – Chicago as Roxie Hart**; Salma Hayek – Frida as Frida Kahlo; Nicole Kidman – The Hours as Virginia Woolf; Diane Lane – Unfaithful as Connie Sumner; Julianne Moore – Far from Heaven as Cathy Whitaker
Outstanding Performance by a Male Actor in a Supporting Role	Outstanding Performance by a Female Actor in a Supporting Role
**Christopher Walken – Catch Me If You Can as Frank Abagnale, Sr.**; Chris Cooper – Adaptation as John Laroche; Ed Harris – The Hours as Richard "Ritchie" Brown; Alfred Molina – Frida as Diego Rivera; Dennis Quaid – Far from Heaven as Frank Whitaker	**Catherine Zeta-Jones – Chicago as Velma Kelly**; Kathy Bates – About Schmidt as Roberta Hertzel; Julianne Moore – The Hours as Laura Brown; Michelle Pfeiffer – White Oleander as Ingrid Magnussen; Queen Latifah – Chicago as Matron "Mama" Morton
Outstanding Performance by a Cast in a Motion Picture
**Chicago – Christine Baranski, Ekaterina Chtchelkanova, Taye Diggs, Denise Faye, Colm Feore, Richard Gere, Deidre Goodwin, Mýa, Lucy Liu, Queen Latifah, Susan Misner, John C. Reilly, Dominic West, Renée Zellweger, and Catherine Zeta-Jones**; Adaptation – Nicolas Cage, Chris Cooper, Brian Cox, Cara Seymour, Meryl Streep, and Tilda Swinton; The Hours – Toni Collette, Claire Danes, Jeff Daniels, Stephen Dillane, Ed Harris, Allison Janney, Nicole Kidman, Julianne Moore, John C. Reilly, Miranda Richardson, and Meryl Streep; The Lord of the Rings: The Two Towers – Sean Astin, Cate Blanchett, Orlando Bloom, Billy Boyd, Brad Dourif, Bernard Hill, Christopher Lee, Ian McKellen, Dominic Monaghan, Viggo Mortensen, Miranda Otto, John Rhys-Davies, Andy Serkis, Liv Tyler, Hugo Weaving, David Wenham, and Elijah Wood; My Big Fat Greek Wedding – Gia Carides, Michael Constantine, John Corbett, Joey Fatone, Lainie Kazan, Andrea Martin, and Nia Vardalos

=== Television ===
Outstanding Performance by a Male Actor in a Miniseries or Television Movie	Outstanding Performance by a Female Actor in a Miniseries or Television Movie
**William H. Macy – Door to Door (TNT) as Bill Porter**; Albert Finney – The Gathering Storm (HBO) as Winston Churchill; Brad Garrett – Gleason (CBS) as Jackie Gleason; Sean Hayes – Martin and Lewis (CBS) as Jerry Lewis; John Turturro – Monday Night Mayhem (TNT) as Howard Cosell	**Stockard Channing – The Matthew Shepard Story (NBC) as Judy Shepard**; Kathy Bates – My Sister's Keeper (CBS) as Christine Chapman; Helen Mirren – Door to Door (TNT) as Mrs. Porter; Vanessa Redgrave – The Gathering Storm (HBO) as Clementine Churchill; Uma Thurman – Hysterical Blindness (HBO) as Debby Miller
Outstanding Performance by a Male Actor in a Drama Series	Outstanding Performance by a Female Actor in a Drama Series
**James Gandolfini – The Sopranos (HBO) as Tony Soprano**; Michael Chiklis – The Shield (FX) as Vic Mackey; Martin Sheen – The West Wing (NBC) as Josiah "Jed" Bartlet; Kiefer Sutherland – 24 (Fox) as Jack Bauer; Treat Williams – Everwood (The WB) as Andrew "Andy" Brown	**Edie Falco – The Sopranos (HBO) as Carmela Soprano**; Lorraine Bracco – The Sopranos (HBO) as Jennifer Melfi; Amy Brenneman – Judging Amy (CBS) as Amy Gray; Allison Janney – The West Wing (NBC) as C. J. Cregg; Lily Tomlin – The West Wing (NBC) as Deborah Fiderer
Outstanding Performance by a Male Actor in a Comedy Series	Outstanding Performance by a Female Actor in a Comedy Series
**Sean Hayes – Will & Grace (NBC) as Jack McFarland**; Matt LeBlanc – Friends (NBC) as Joey Tribbiani; Bernie Mac – The Bernie Mac Show (Fox) as Bernie McCollough; Ray Romano – Everybody Loves Raymond (CBS) as Ray Barone; Tony Shalhoub – Monk (USA Network) as Adrian Monk	**Megan Mullally – Will & Grace (NBC) as Karen Walker**; Jennifer Aniston – Friends (NBC) as Rachel Green; Kim Cattrall – Sex and the City (HBO) as Samantha Jones; Patricia Heaton – Everybody Loves Raymond (CBS) as Debra Barone; Jane Kaczmarek – Malcolm in the Middle (Fox) as Lois Wilkerson
Outstanding Performance by an Ensemble in a Drama Series
**Six Feet Under (HBO) – Lauren Ambrose, Frances Conroy, Rachel Griffiths, Michael C. Hall, Richard Jenkins, Peter Krause, Freddy Rodriguez, Jeremy Sisto, and Mathew St. Patrick**; 24 (Fox) – Reiko Aylesworth, Xander Berkeley, Carlos Bernard, Sarah Clarke, Elisha Cuthbert, Michelle Forbes, Laura Harris, Dennis Haysbert, Leslie Hope, Penny Johnson Jerald, Phillip Rhys, Kiefer Sutherland, and Sarah Wynter; CSI: Crime Scene Investigation (CBS) – Gary Dourdan, George Eads, Jorja Fox, Paul Guilfoyle, Robert David Hall, Marg Helgenberger, William Petersen, and Eric Szmanda; The Sopranos (HBO) – Lorraine Bracco, Federico Castelluccio, Dominic Chianese, Drea de Matteo, Edie Falco, James Gandolfini, Robert Iler, Michael Imperioli, Joe Pantoliano, Steve Schirripa, Jamie-Lynn Sigler, Tony Sirico, Aida Turturro, Steven Van Zandt, and John Ventimiglia; The West Wing (NBC) – Stockard Channing, Dulé Hill, Allison Janney, Joshua Malina, Rob Lowe, Janel Moloney, Richard Schiff, Martin Sheen, John Spencer, and Bradley Whitford
Outstanding Performance by an Ensemble in a Comedy Series
**Everybody Loves Raymond (CBS) – Peter Boyle, Brad Garrett, Patricia Heaton, Doris Roberts, Ray Romano, and Madylin Sweeten**; Frasier (NBC) – Peri Gilpin, Kelsey Grammer, Jane Leeves, John Mahoney, and David Hyde Pierce; Friends (NBC) – Jennifer Aniston, Courteney Cox Arquette, Lisa Kudrow, Matt LeBlanc, Matthew Perry, and David Schwimmer; Sex and the City (HBO) – Kim Cattrall, Kristin Davis, Cynthia Nixon, and Sarah Jessica Parker; Will & Grace (NBC) – Sean Hayes, Eric McCormack, Debra Messing, Shelley Morrison, and Megan Mullally

=== Screen Actors Guild Life Achievement Award ===
- Clint Eastwood

== Multiple nominations ==
=== Film ===
Nominations	Film
5	Chicago
4	The Hours
3	Adaptation
2	About Schmidt
2	Far from Heaven
2	Frida

=== Television ===
Nominations	Program
4	The Sopranos
4	The West Wing
3	Everybody Loves Raymond
3	Friends
3	Will & Grace
2	24
2	Door to Door
2	The Gathering Storm
2	Sex and the City

== Multiple wins ==
=== Film ===
Wins	Film
3	Chicago

=== Television ===
Wins	Program
2	The Sopranos
2	Will & Grace

== In Memoriam ==
William H. Macy presented a clip tribute to the actors who died in 2002:

- James Coburn
- Milton Berle
- Billie Bird
- Eddie Bracken
- John Agar
- Peg Phillips
- Keene Curtis
- Parley Baer
- Nell Carter
- Ron Soble
- Cliff Gorman
- James Gregory
- Mary Stuart
- Jonathan Harris
- Kim Hunter
- Katy Jurado
- Jack Kruschen
- Bill McCutcheon
- Jeff Corey
- Richard Harris
- Robert Urich
- Raf Vallone
- Irene Worth
- Dennis Patrick
- LaWanda Page
- Lawrence Tierney
- Brad Dexter
- Ray Stricklyn
- Rod Steiger
- Dudley Moore
- Rosemary Clooney
- Beulah Quo
- Richard Crenna
- William Warfield
