= 8th Critics' Choice Awards =

2003 US film awards

- Date: January 17, 2003
- Official website: www.criticschoice.com

Highlights
- Best Film: Chicago

The 8th Critics' Choice Awards were presented on January 17, 2003, honoring the finest achievements of 2002 filmmaking.

This ceremony is particularly notable for the moment when Best Actor nominee Robin Williams approached the stage after being called upon by Best Actor co-winner Jack Nicholson, who claimed to be "baked", to assist him with his acceptance speech.

== Top 10 films ==
(in alphabetical order)

- About Schmidt
- Adaptation.
- Catch Me If You Can
- Chicago
- Far from Heaven
- Gangs of New York
- The Hours
- The Lord of the Rings: The Two Towers
- The Pianist
- Road to Perdition

== Winners and nominees ==
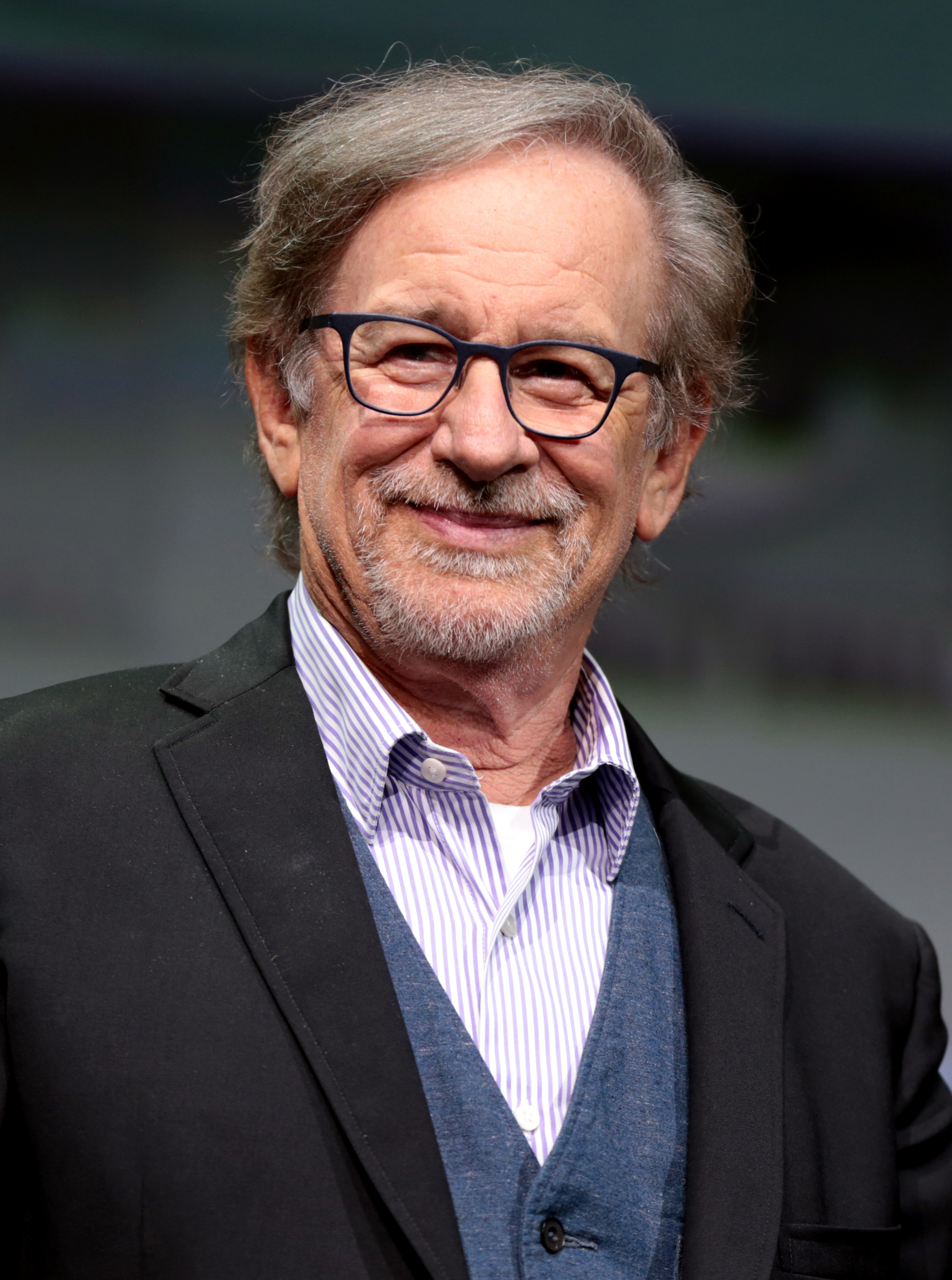
Steven Spielberg, Best Director winner

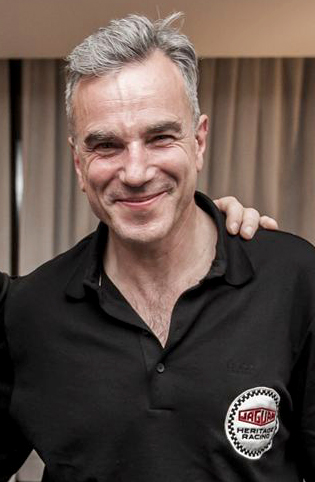
Daniel Day-Lewis, Best Actor co-winner

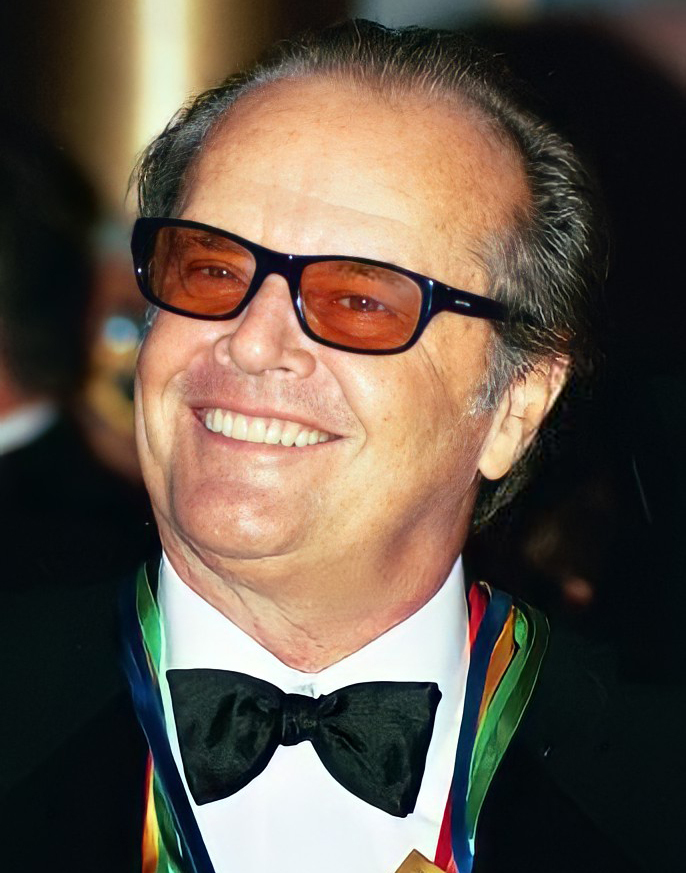
Jack Nicholson, Best Actor co-winner

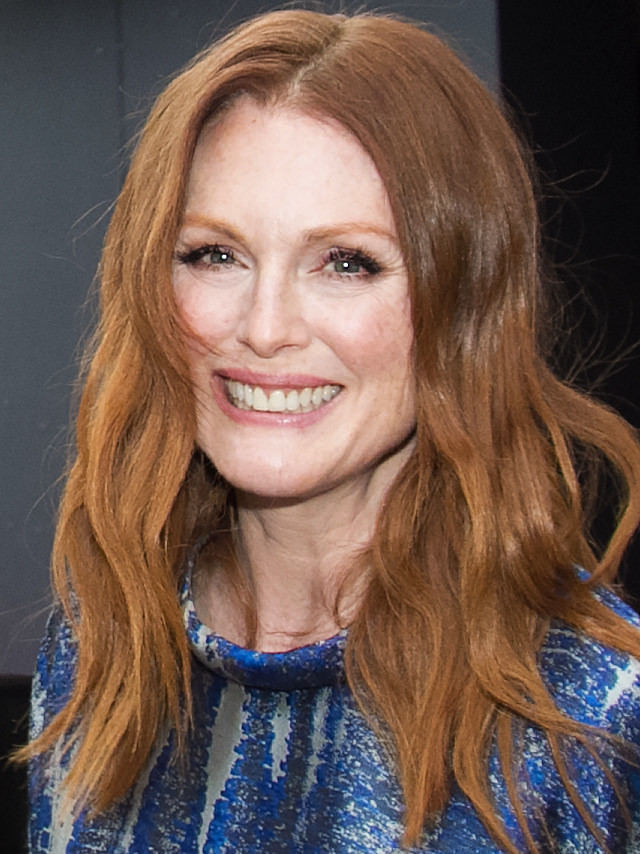
Julianne Moore, Best Actress winner

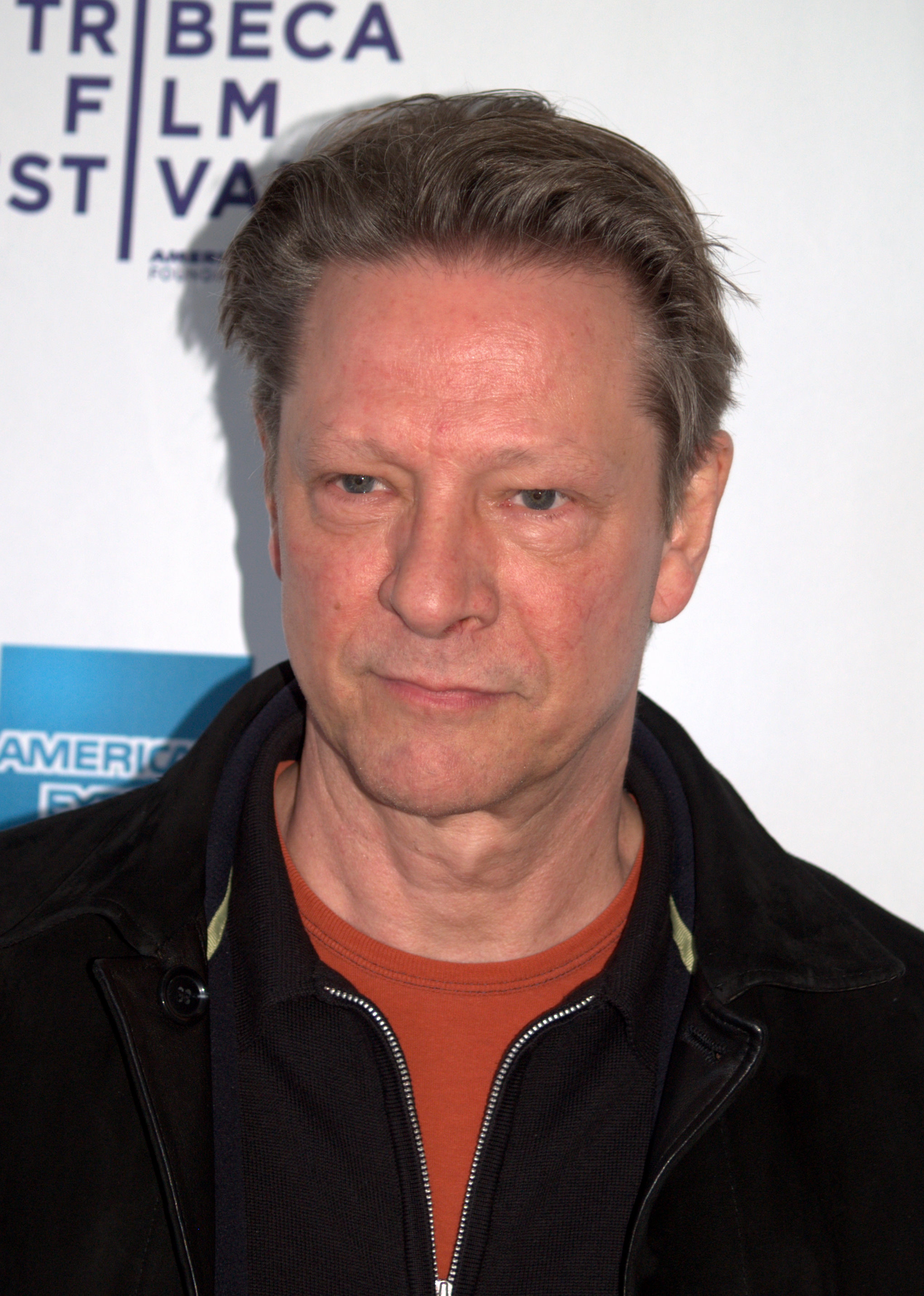
Chris Cooper, Best Supporting Actor winner

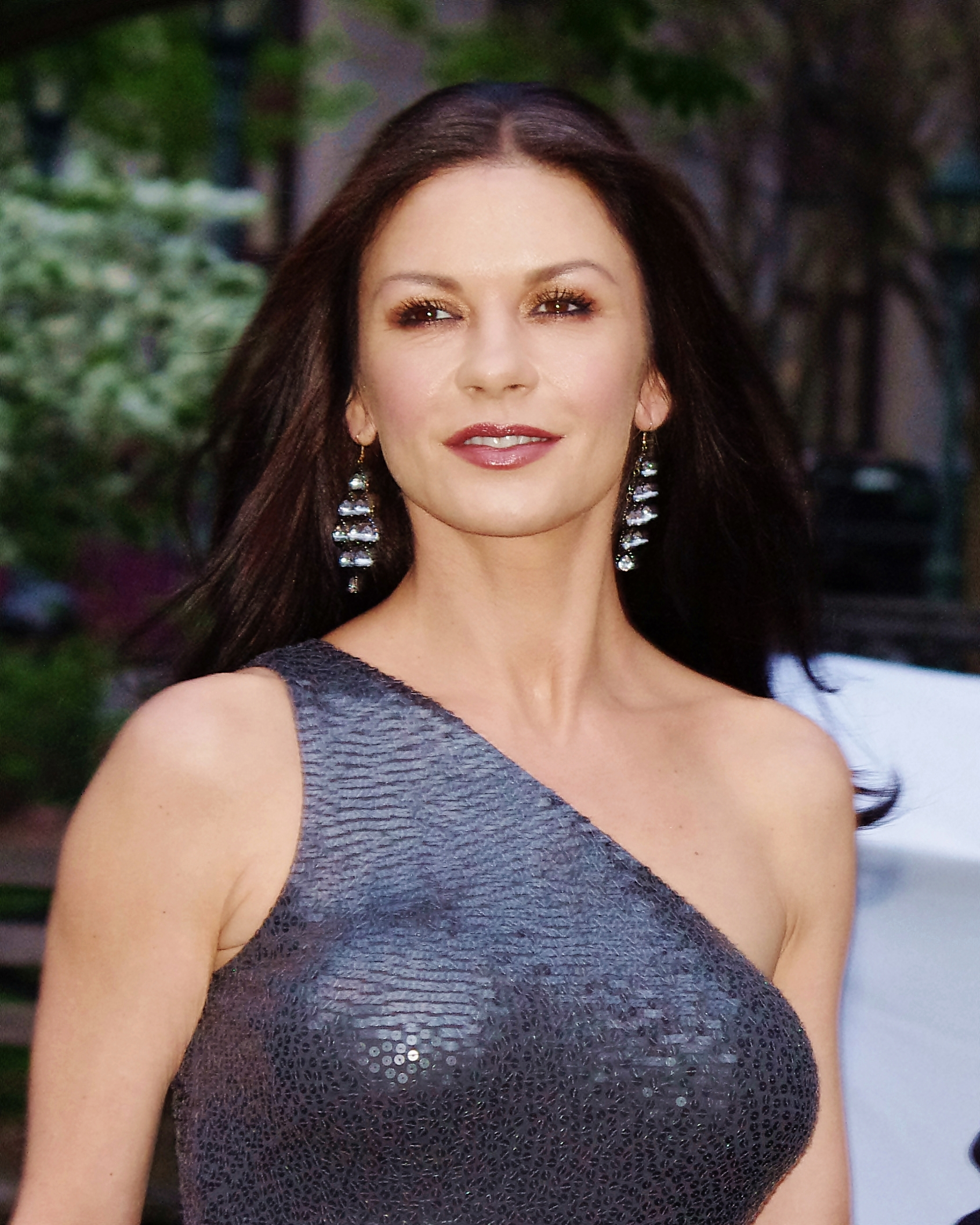
Catherine Zeta-Jones, Best Supporting Actress winner

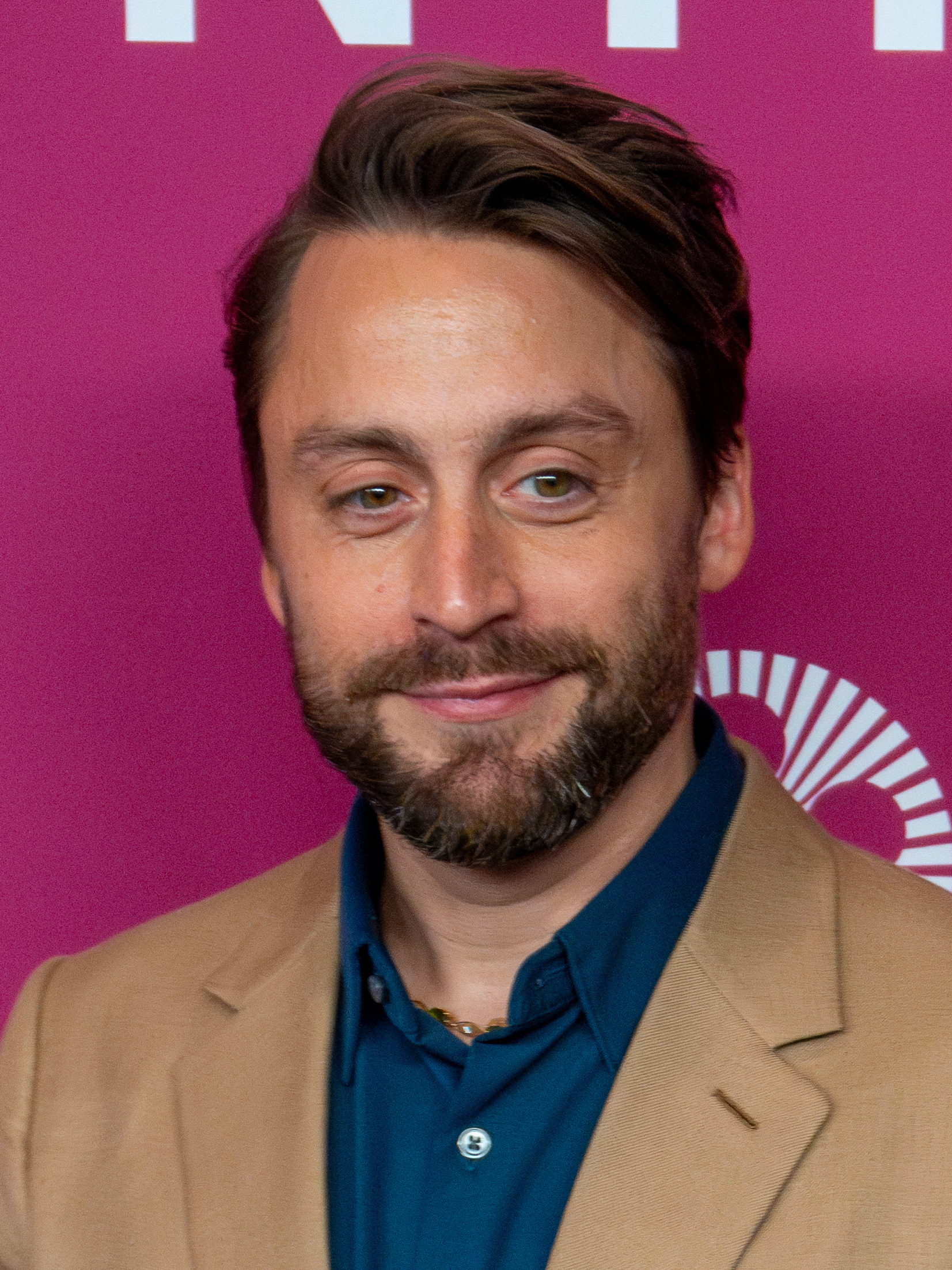
Kieran Culkin, Best Young Actor/Actress winner

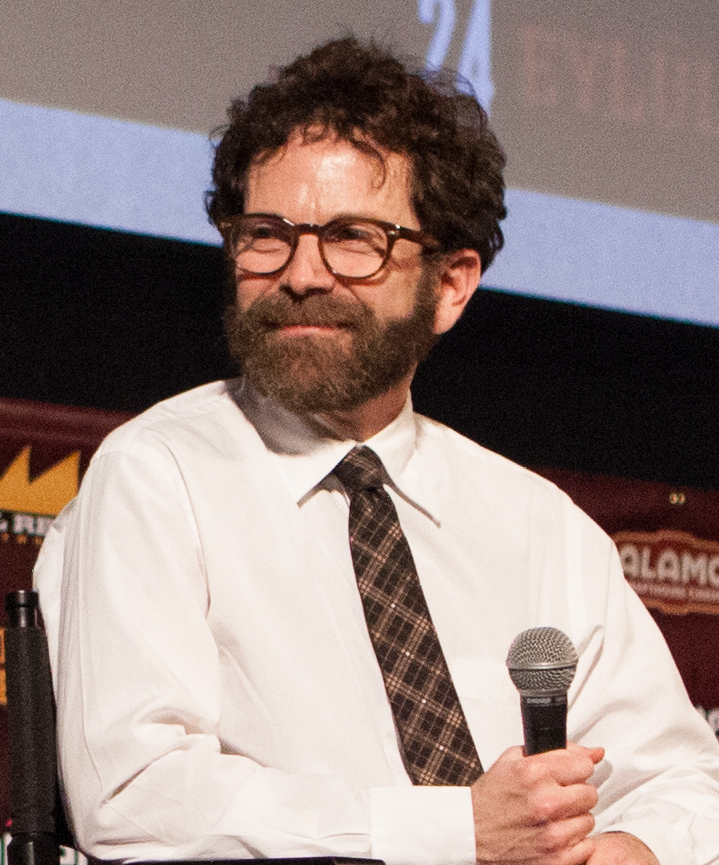
Charlie Kaufman, Best Writer winner

Best Picture Chicago: About Schmidt; Adaptation.; Catch Me If You Can; Far from Heaven; Gangs of New York; The Hours; The Lord of the Rings: The Two Towers; The Pianist; Road to Perdition	Best Director Steven Spielberg – Catch Me If You Can / Minority Report: Roman Polanski – The Pianist; Martin Scorsese – Gangs of New York
Best Actor Daniel Day-Lewis – Gangs of New York as Bill "The Butcher" Cutting (TIE); Jack Nicholson – About Schmidt as Warren Schmidt (TIE): Robin Williams – One Hour Photo as Seymour "Sy" Parrish	Best Actress Julianne Moore – Far from Heaven as Cathleen "Cathy" Whitaker: Salma Hayek – Frida as Frida Kahlo; Nicole Kidman – The Hours as Virginia Woolf; Diane Lane – Unfaithful as Constance "Connie" Sumner
Best Supporting Actor Chris Cooper – Adaptation. as John Laroche: Alfred Molina – Frida as Diego Rivera; Paul Newman – Road to Perdition as John Rooney	Best Supporting Actress Catherine Zeta-Jones – Chicago as Velma Kelly: Kathy Bates – About Schmidt as Roberta Hertzel; Meryl Streep – Adaptation. as Susan Orlean
Best Young Actor/Actress Kieran Culkin – Igby Goes Down as Jason "Igby" Slocumb Jr.: Tyler Hoechlin – Road to Perdition as Michael Sullivan Jr.; Nicholas Hoult – About a Boy as Marcus Brewer	Best Digital Acting Performance Gollum – The Lord of the Rings: The Two Towers: Dobby – Harry Potter and the Chamber of Secrets; Yoda – Star Wars: Episode II – Attack of the Clones
Best Acting Ensemble Chicago: The Hours; My Big Fat Greek Wedding	Best Writer Adaptation. / Confessions of a Dangerous Mind – Charlie Kaufman: About Schmidt – Alexander Payne and Jim Taylor; My Big Fat Greek Wedding – Nia Vardalos
Best Animated Feature Spirited Away: Ice Age; Lilo & Stitch; Spirit: Stallion of the Cimarron	Best Documentary Feature Bowling for Columbine: The Kid Stays in the Picture; Standing in the Shadows of Motown
Best Family Film Harry Potter and the Chamber of Secrets: The Rookie; Tuck Everlasting	Best Foreign Language Film Y tu mamá también • Mexico: Monsoon Wedding • India; Talk to Her • Spain
Best Composer Catch Me If You Can / Harry Potter and the Chamber of Secrets / Minority Report – John Williams: The Hours – Philip Glass; The Lord of the Rings: The Two Towers – Howard Shore	Best Song "Lose Yourself" – 8 Mile: "Father and Daughter" – The Wild Thornberrys Movie; "Hero" – Spider-Man

=== Freedom Award ===
Denzel Washington – Antwone Fisher

=== Best Picture Made for Television ===
Door to Door

- Live from Baghdad
- Martin and Lewis

== Statistics ==
Nominations	Film
4	About Schmidt
4	Adaptation.
4	The Hours
3	Catch Me If You Can
3	Chicago
3	Gangs of New York
3	Harry Potter and the Chamber of Secrets
3	The Lord of the Rings: The Two Towers
3	Road to Perdition
2	Far from Heaven
2	Frida
2	Minority Report
2	My Big Fat Greek Wedding
2	The Pianist

Wins	Film
3	Chicago
2	Adaptation.
2	Catch Me If You Can
2	Harry Potter and the Chamber of Secrets
2	Minority Report
