= Bill Porter (salesman) =

American salesman

- Born: William Douglas Porter; September 9, 1932; San Francisco, California, US
- Died: December 3, 2013 (aged 81); Gresham, Oregon, US
- Occupation: Door-to-door salesman

William Douglas Porter (September 9, 1932 – December 3, 2013) was an American salesman, who worked for Watkins Incorporated based in Winona, Minnesota. Born with cerebral palsy, Porter's background and work was brought to the public's attention in 1995 when an Oregon-based newspaper published a series of feature articles about him.

== Life ==
Bill Porter was born in San Francisco, California, and at a young age moved to Portland, Oregon along with his mother. He was unable to gain employment due to his cerebral palsy, but refused to go on disability. Porter eventually convinced Watkins Incorporated to give him a door-to-door salesman job, selling its products on a seven-mile route in the Portland area. He eventually became Watkins' top seller, and worked for the company for over forty years.

In 1995, the newspaper The Oregonian ran a feature article about Porter. The story of his optimistic determination made him the subject of media attention across the United States. He was featured in Reader's Digest and on ABC's 20/20. The 20/20 broadcast received over 2000 phone calls and letters, which was the most ever for a 20/20 story.

Porter was the subject of a 2002 made-for-TV movie on TNT called Door to Door, featuring William H. Macy, Kyra Sedgwick and Helen Mirren. In 2009, the Japanese TBS network aired a TV movie loosely based on Bill Porter, also called Door to Door. It starred Ninomiya Kazunari and Rosa Kato as fictional versions of Porter and Shelly Brady.

Bill Porter died of an infection in Gresham, Oregon, on December 3, 2013, at the age of 81.
