= Online Film Critics Society Awards 2002 =

6th Online Film Critics Society Awards

6th Online Film Critics Society Awards

January 6, 2003

Best Film:
The Lord of the Rings:
The Two Towers

The 6th Online Film Critics Society Awards, honoring the best in filmmaking in 2002, were given on 6 January 2003.

== Top 10 films ==
1. The Lord of the Rings: The Two Towers
2. Far from Heaven
3. Minority Report
4. Adaptation.
5. Gangs of New York
6. The Pianist
7. Bowling for Columbine
8. Punch-Drunk Love
9. Road to Perdition
10. About Schmidt

== Winners and nominees ==
=== Best Picture ===
The Lord of the Rings: The Two Towers

- Adaptation.
- Bowling for Columbine
- Far from Heaven
- Minority Report

=== Best Director ===
Peter Jackson – The Lord of the Rings: The Two Towers

- Todd Haynes – Far from Heaven
- Spike Jonze – Adaptation.
- Martin Scorsese – Gangs of New York
- Steven Spielberg – Minority Report

=== Best Actor ===
Daniel Day-Lewis – Gangs of New York

- Adrien Brody – The Pianist
- Nicolas Cage – Adaptation.
- Jack Nicholson – About Schmidt
- Robin Williams – One Hour Photo

=== Best Actress ===
Julianne Moore – Far from Heaven

- Jennifer Aniston – The Good Girl
- Maggie Gyllenhaal – Secretary
- Isabelle Huppert – The Piano Teacher
- Diane Lane – Unfaithful

=== Best Supporting Actor ===
Dennis Quaid – Far from Heaven

- Alan Arkin – Thirteen Conversations About One Thing
- Chris Cooper – Adaptation.
- Paul Newman – Road to Perdition
- Andy Serkis – The Lord of the Rings: The Two Towers

=== Best Supporting Actress ===
Samantha Morton – Minority Report

- Kathy Bates – About Schmidt
- Edie Falco – Sunshine State
- Meryl Streep – Adaptation.
- Catherine Zeta-Jones – Chicago

=== Best Original Screenplay ===
Far from Heaven – Todd Haynes

- Frailty – Brent Hanley
- Punch-Drunk Love – Paul Thomas Anderson
- Roger Dodger – Dylan Kidd
- Signs – M. Night Shyamalan

=== Best Adapted Screenplay ===
Adaptation. – Charlie Kaufman and Donald Kaufman

- About Schmidt – Alexander Payne and Jim Taylor
- Catch Me If You Can – Jeff Nathanson
- The Lord of the Rings: The Two Towers – Fran Walsh, Philippa Boyens, Stephen Sinclair and Peter Jackson
- Minority Report – Scott Frank and Jon Cohen

=== Best Foreign Language Film ===
Y Tu Mamá También

- Atanarjuat: The Fast Runner
- Monsoon Wedding
- Spirited Away
- Talk to Her

=== Best Documentary ===
Bowling for Columbine

- Comedian
- Dogtown and Z-Boys
- The Kid Stays in the Picture
- Standing in the Shadows of Motown

=== Best Animated Feature ===
Spirited Away

- Ice Age
- Lilo & Stitch
- Metropolis
- Spirit: Stallion of the Cimarron

=== Best Cinematography ===
Far from Heaven – Edward Lachman

- Gangs of New York – Michael Ballhaus
- The Lord of the Rings: The Two Towers – Andrew Lesnie
- Minority Report – Janusz Kamiński
- Road to Perdition – Conrad L. Hall

=== Best Editing ===
The Lord of the Rings: The Two Towers – Michael Horton and Jabez Olssen

- Adaptation. – Eric Zumbrunnen
- Chicago – Martin Walsh
- Minority Report – Michael Kahn
- Panic Room – James Haygood and Angus Wall

=== Best Ensemble ===
The Lord of the Rings: The Two Towers

- 8 Women
- Adaptation.
- Chicago
- Gangs of New York

=== Best Original Score ===
Far from Heaven – Elmer Bernstein

- Catch Me If You Can – John Williams
- The Lord of the Rings: The Two Towers – Howard Shore
- Punch-Drunk Love – Jon Brion
- Signs – James Newton Howard

=== Best Art Direction ===
Far from Heaven

- Gangs of New York
- The Lord of the Rings: The Two Towers
- Minority Report
- Road to Perdition

=== Best Costume Design ===
Far from Heaven

- 8 Women
- Chicago
- Gangs of New York
- The Lord of the Rings: The Two Towers

=== Best Sound ===
The Lord of the Rings: The Two Towers

- Gangs of New York
- Minority Report
- Signs
- Star Wars: Episode II – Attack of the Clones

=== Best Visual Effects ===
The Lord of the Rings: The Two Towers

- Harry Potter and the Chamber of Secrets
- Minority Report
- Spider-Man
- Star Wars: Episode II – Attack of the Clones

=== Breakthrough Filmmaker ===
Mark Romanek – One Hour Photo

- Dylan Kidd – Roger Dodger
- Rob Marshall – Chicago
- Bill Paxton – Frailty
- Burr Steers – Igby Goes Down

=== Breakthrough Performer ===
Maggie Gyllenhaal – Secretary

- Steve Coogan – 24 Hour Party People
- Eminem – 8 Mile
- Derek Luke – Antwone Fisher
- Nia Vardalos – My Big Fat Greek Wedding
