= San Francisco Film Critics Circle Awards 2002 =

Annual US film awards ceremony

San Francisco Film Critics Circle Awards 2002

December 17, 2002

Best Picture:
The Pianist

The 1st San Francisco Film Critics Circle Awards, honoring the best in film for 2002, were given on 17 December 2002.

== Winners ==
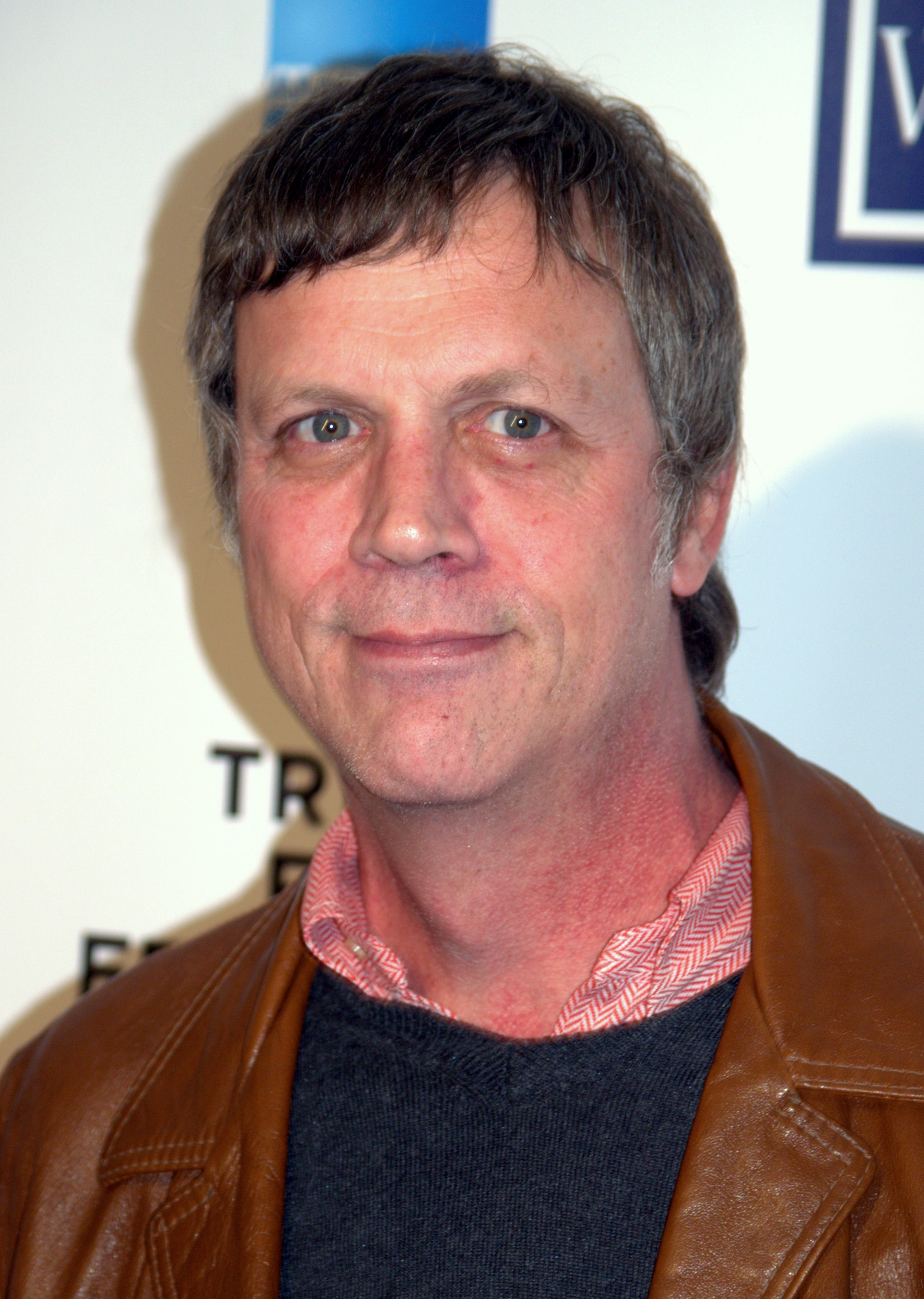
Todd Haynes, Best Director winner

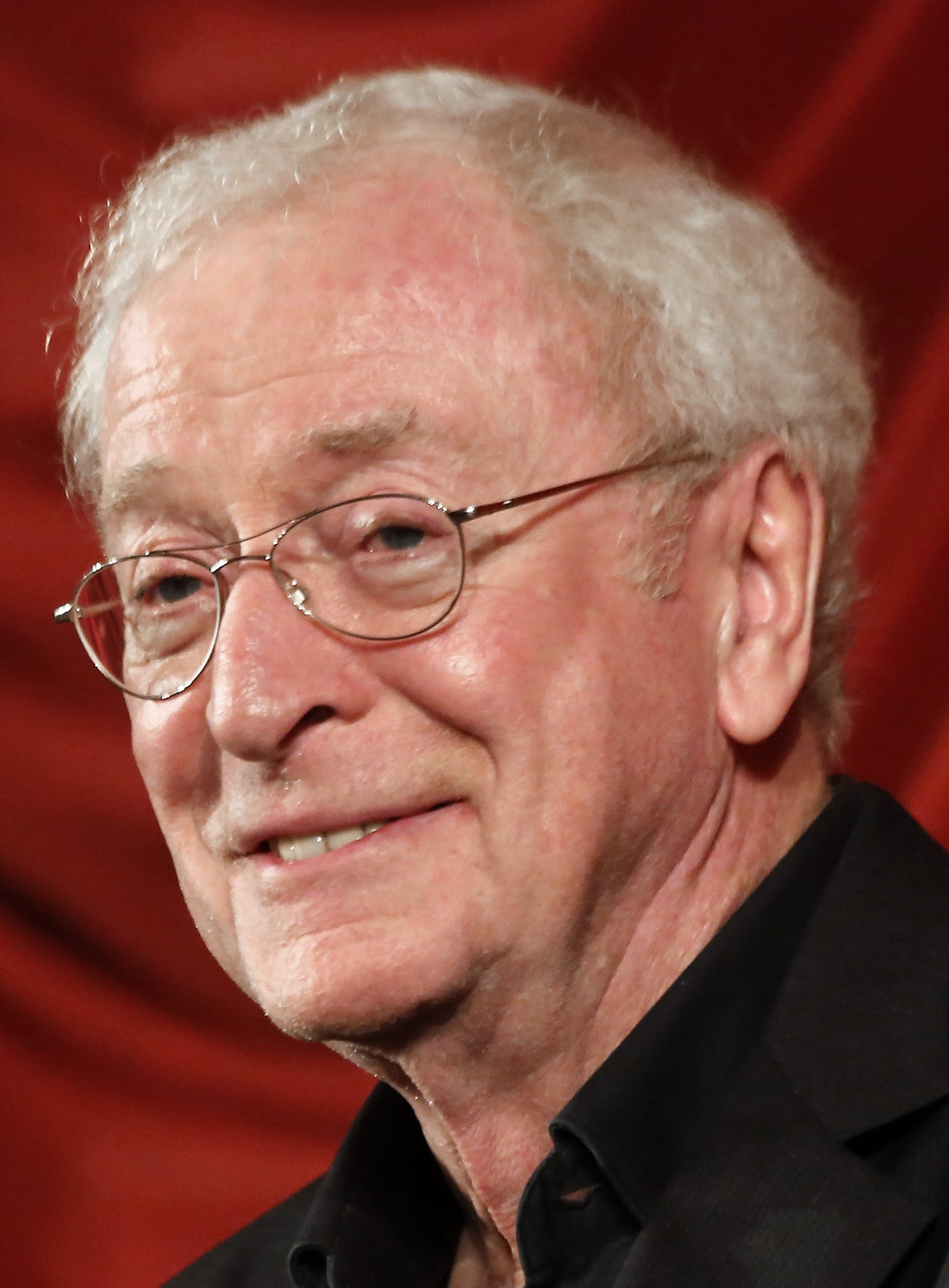
Michael Caine, Best Actor winner

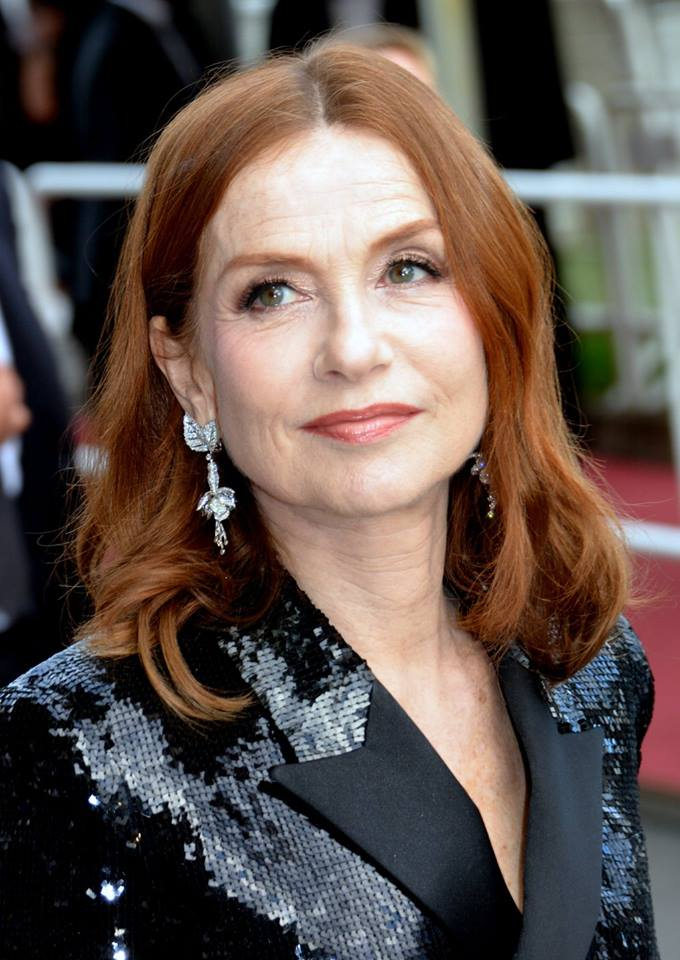
Isabelle Huppert, Best Actress winner

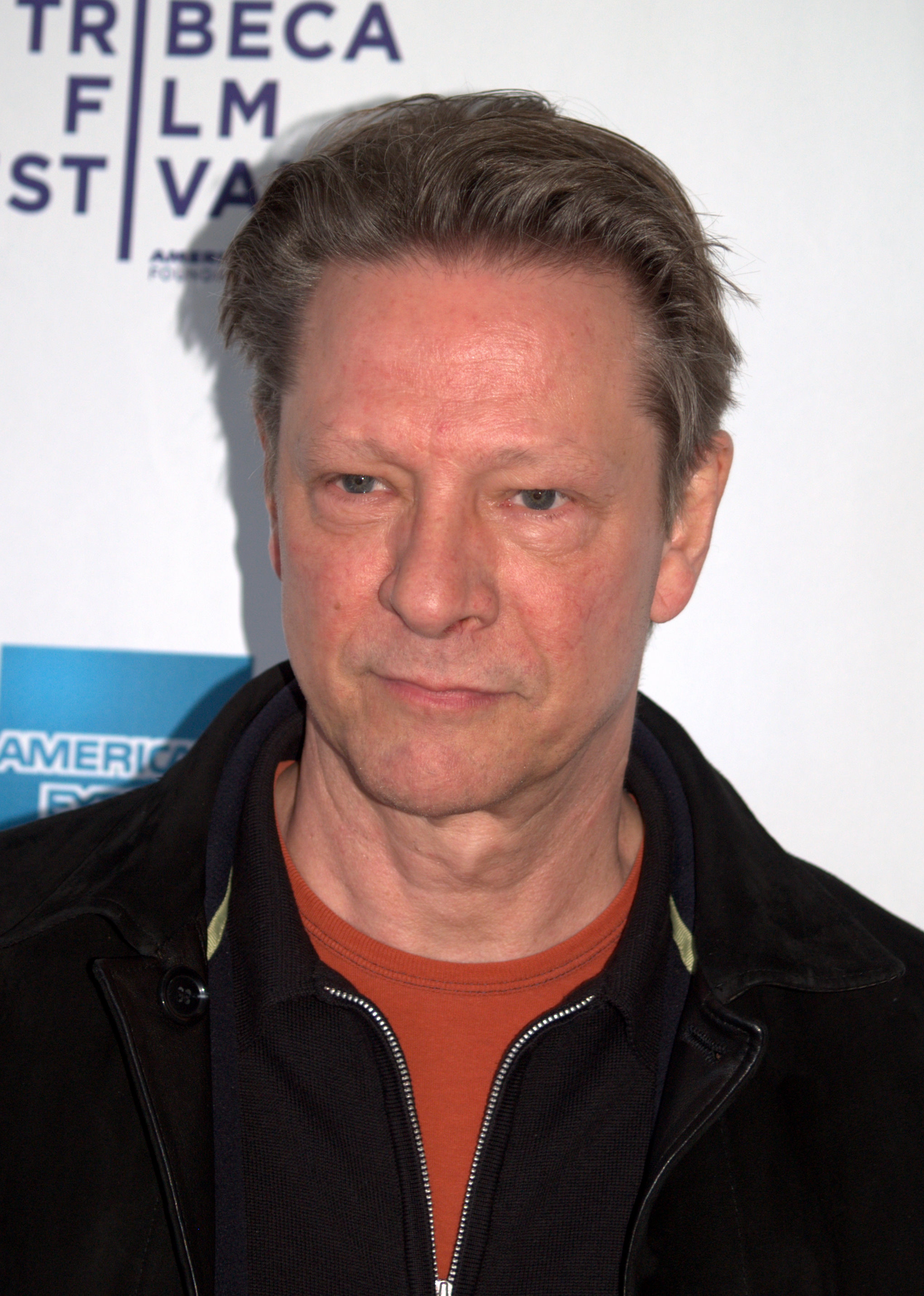
Chris Cooper, Best Supporting Actor winner

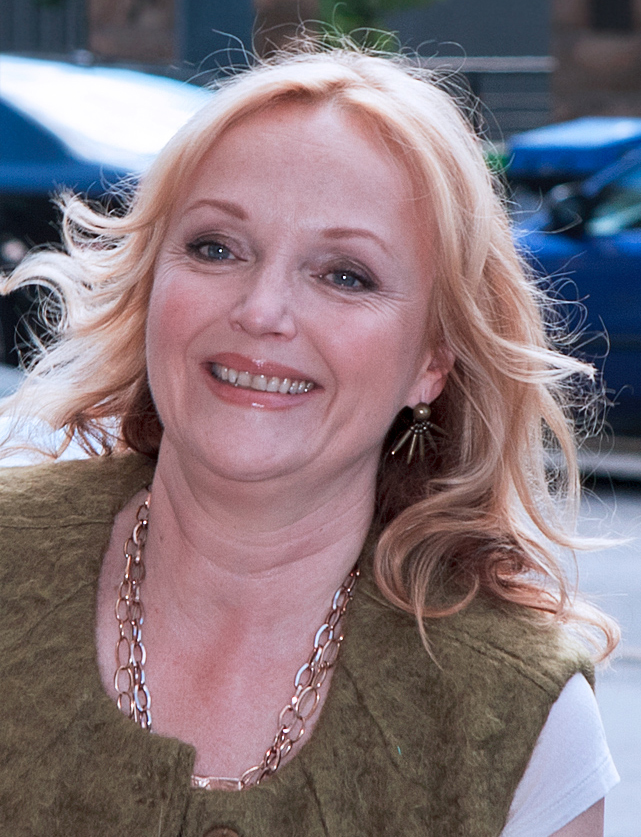
Miranda Richardson, Best Supporting Actress winner

- Best Picture:
  - The Pianist
- Best Director:
  - Todd Haynes - Far from Heaven
- Best Actor:
  - Michael Caine - The Quiet American
- Best Actress:
  - Isabelle Huppert - The Piano Teacher (La pianiste)
- Best Supporting Actor:
  - Chris Cooper - Adaptation.
- Best Supporting Actress:
  - Miranda Richardson - Spider
- Best Foreign Language Film:
  - Y Tu Mamá También • Mexico
- Best Documentary:
  - Rivers and Tides
- Most Promising Debut:
  - Dylan Kidd - Roger Dodger
- Special Citation:
  - Phillip Noyce - Rabbit-Proof Fence and The Quiet American
  - Jay Rosenblatt and Caveh Zahedi - Underground Zero
