= Adaptation (film) =

2002 film by Spike Jonze

- Theatrical release poster
- Directed by: Spike Jonze
- Screenplay by: Charlie Kaufman (Note: Kaufman is credited as "Charlie Kaufman and Donald Kaufman", despite Donald being a fictional character created for the film.)
- Based on: The Orchid Thief by Susan Orlean
- Produced by: Edward Saxon; Vincent Landay; Jonathan Demme
- Starring: Nicolas Cage; Meryl Streep; Chris Cooper
- Cinematography: Lance Acord
- Edited by: Eric Zumbrunnen
- Music by: Carter Burwell
- Production companies: Columbia Pictures; Intermedia Films; Magnet Productions; Clinica Estetico Productions
- Distributed by: Sony Pictures Releasing
- Release date: December 6, 2002
- Running time: 115 minutes
- Country: United States
- Language: English
- Budget: $19 million
- Box office: $32.8 million

Adaptation (stylized as Adaptation.) is a 2002 American comedy-drama film directed by Spike Jonze and written by Charlie Kaufman. It features a cast led by Nicolas Cage, Meryl Streep, and Chris Cooper, with Tilda Swinton, Cara Seymour, Brian Cox, Maggie Gyllenhaal, and Ron Livingston in supporting roles.

Kaufman based Adaptation on his struggles to adapt Susan Orlean's 1998 nonfiction book The Orchid Thief while suffering from writer's block. It involves elements adapted from the book, plus fictitious elements, including Kaufman's twin brother (also credited as a writer for the film) and a romance between Orlean and John Laroche (Cooper). It culminates in completely invented elements, including versions of Orlean and Laroche three years after the events of The Orchid Thief.

Adaptation received widespread critical acclaim for its direction, screenplay, humor, and the performances of Cage, Cooper, and Streep. It received awards at the 75th Academy Awards, 60th Golden Globe Awards, and 56th British Academy Film Awards, with Cooper winning the Academy Award for Best Supporting Actor and Kaufman winning the BAFTA Award for Best Adapted Screenplay. A British Film Institute poll ranked it one of the thirty best films of the 2000s.

== Plot ==
In the fall of 1999, self-loathing screenwriter Charlie Kaufman is hired to write an adaptation of Susan Orlean's The Orchid Thief. He struggles with anxiety, social phobia, depression, and low self-esteem. His twin brother Donald, freeloading in his house, decides to become a screenwriter like Charlie and attends seminars by screenwriting guru Robert McKee.

Charlie, who rejects formulaic scriptwriting, wants to faithfully adapt the book but the lack of a usable narrative makes it impossible to turn into a film and he develops writer's block. Already past his deadline with Columbia Pictures and despairing of writing a self-referential script, Charlie travels to New York City to discuss the screenplay with Orlean directly. Too shy and socially awkward to speak with Orlean upon arriving at her office and after receiving the surprising news that Donald's spec script for a cliché psychological thriller, The 3, is selling for six or seven figures, Charlie attends McKee's seminar in New York and asks him for advice. Charlie ends up asking Donald to join him in New York to assist with the story structure.

Donald, more confident socially, pretends to be Charlie and interviews Orlean but finds her responses suspicious. He and Charlie follow Orlean to Florida, where she meets John Laroche, the orchid-stealing protagonist of the book and her secret lover. It is revealed that the Seminole wanted the ghost orchid to manufacture a mind-altering drug that causes fascination.

In a flashback to 1995, Laroche introduces the drug to Orlean after a long attempt at contact after his arrest. In the present, after Laroche and Orlean catch Charlie observing them taking the drug and having sex, Orlean decides Charlie must be killed to prevent him from exposing them, though Laroche disagrees.

Orlean forces Charlie to drive to the swamp at gunpoint, intending to kill him. Donald, who had followed them, overpowers her as she exits the car and escapes with Charlie into the swamp, where they reconcile. The next morning they try to escape and Donald accidentally wakes a sleeping Laroche, who in turn accidentally shoots Donald. Charlie and Donald drive off in Orlean's car, but collide with a ranger's truck. Donald is ejected through the windshield and dies moments later, but Charlie is saved by the airbag. Laroche spots Charlie in the swamp but is killed by an alligator before he can kill Charlie. Orlean is arrested and Charlie cleared of wrongdoing.

Charlie reconciles with his mother as he informs her of Donald's death. He tells his former romantic interest, Amelia, that he loves her. She responds that she loves him too. Charlie finishes the script, which ends with him announcing in voice-over that the script is finished and that, for the first time, he is filled with hope.

== Cast ==
Nicolas Cage portrays Charlie and Donald Kaufman through split screen.

- Nicolas Cage as Charlie and Donald Kaufman
- Meryl Streep as Susan Orlean
- Chris Cooper as John Laroche
- Tilda Swinton as Valerie Thomas
- Cara Seymour as Amelia Kavan
- Brian Cox as Robert McKee
- Judy Greer as Alice
- Maggie Gyllenhaal as Caroline Cunningham
- Ron Livingston as Marty Bowen
- Jay Tavare as Matthew Osceola
- G. Paul Davis as Russell
- Jim Beaver as Ranger Tony
- Doug Jones as Augustus Margary
- Gary Farmer as Buster Baxley
- Peter Jason as defense attorney
- Bob Yerkes as Charles Darwin

Cage played the dual role of Charlie and his fictional brother, Donald. He turned down the role of Norman Osborn / Green Goblin in Spider-Man (2002) in favor of the film. He took the role for a $5 million salary, and wore a fatsuit during filming.

Streep expressed strong interest in the role of Susan Orlean before being cast, and took a salary cut in recognition of the film's budget. John Turturro was approached to portray John Laroche. Cooper strongly considered turning down Laroche, but accepted it after his wife urged him to. Albert Finney, Christopher Plummer, Terence Stamp, and Michael Caine were considered for the role of Robert McKee, but McKee personally suggested Brian Cox to filmmakers.

John Cusack, Catherine Keener, John Malkovich, Lance Acord, Thomas Patrick Smith, and Spike Jonze have uncredited cameos as themselves in scenes where Charlie Kaufman is on the set of Being John Malkovich, which he also wrote. Additional cameos include director Curtis Hanson as Orlean's husband and David O. Russell as a New Yorker journalist.

== Production ==
=== Development ===
The emotions that Charlie is going through [in the film] are real and they reflect what I was going through when I was trying to write the script. Of course there are specific things that have been exaggerated or changed for cinematic purposes. Part of the experience of watching this movie is the experience of seeing that Donald Kaufman is credited as the co-screenwriter. It's part of the movie, it's part of the story.

— Charlie Kaufman on writing the script

The idea of a film adaptation of Susan Orlean's The Orchid Thief dates to 1994. Fox 2000 purchased the film rights in 1997, eventually selling them to Jonathan Demme, who set the project at Columbia Pictures. Charlie Kaufman was hired to write the script, but struggled with the adaptation and writer's block. He eventually created a script from his experience in adaptation, exaggerating events and inventing a twin brother. He put Donald Kaufman's name on the script and dedicated the film to him. By September 1999, Kaufman had written two drafts of the script; he turned in a third draft in November 2000.

Kaufman said, "The idea of how to write the film didn't come to me until quite late. It was the only idea I had, I liked it, and I knew there was no way it would be approved if I pitched it. So I just wrote it and never told the people I was writing it for. I only told Spike Jonze, as we were making Being John Malkovich and he saw how frustrated I was. Had he said I was crazy, I don't know what I would have done." He also said, "I really thought I was ending my career by turning that in!"

Adaptation went on fast track in April 2000, with Kaufman making some revisions. Scott Brake of IGN gave the script a positive review in June 2000, as did Drew McWeeny of Ain't It Cool News in October. Columbia Pictures committed to North American distribution only after Intermedia came aboard to finance the film in exchange for international distribution rights.

=== Filming ===
Filming started in late March 2001 in Los Angeles and finished by June. The "evolution" fantasy sequence was created by Digital Domain, while Skywalker Sound handled audio post production services. The makeup effects (the doubled Cage, Cooper's teeth, and the alligator attack) are by makeup effects designer Tony Gardner and his effects company Alterian, Inc. Citing the difficulty of playing Charlie and Donald Kaufman simultaneously, Cage later said Adaptation was "the most challenging thing I've ever done."

== Release ==
Columbia Pictures at one point announced a late 2001 theatrical release date, but Adaptation opened on December 6, 2002, in the United States in a limited release. It was released nationwide on February 14, 2003, earning $1,130,480 in its opening weekend in 672 theaters. It went on to gross $22.5 million in North America and $10.3 million in foreign countries, for a total of $32.8 million.

=== Home media ===
Adaptation was released on DVD and VHS by Columbia TriStar Home Entertainment in May 2003. Image Entertainment released a bare-bones Blu-ray in 2012, which was followed in 2020 by another release through Shout! Factory.

== Reception ==
=== Critical response ===
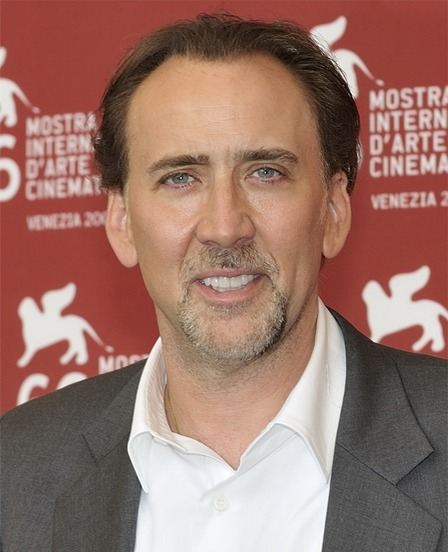
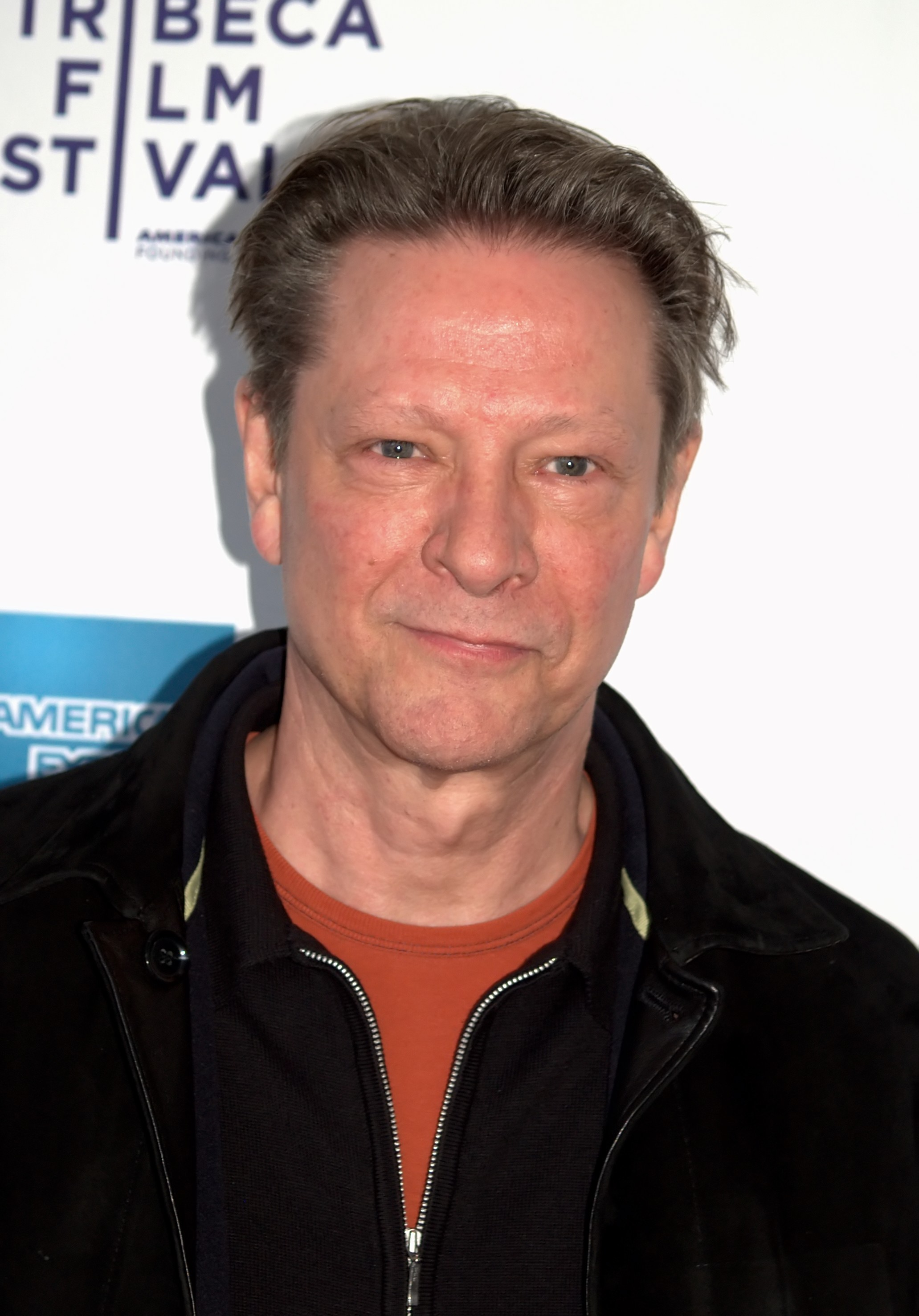
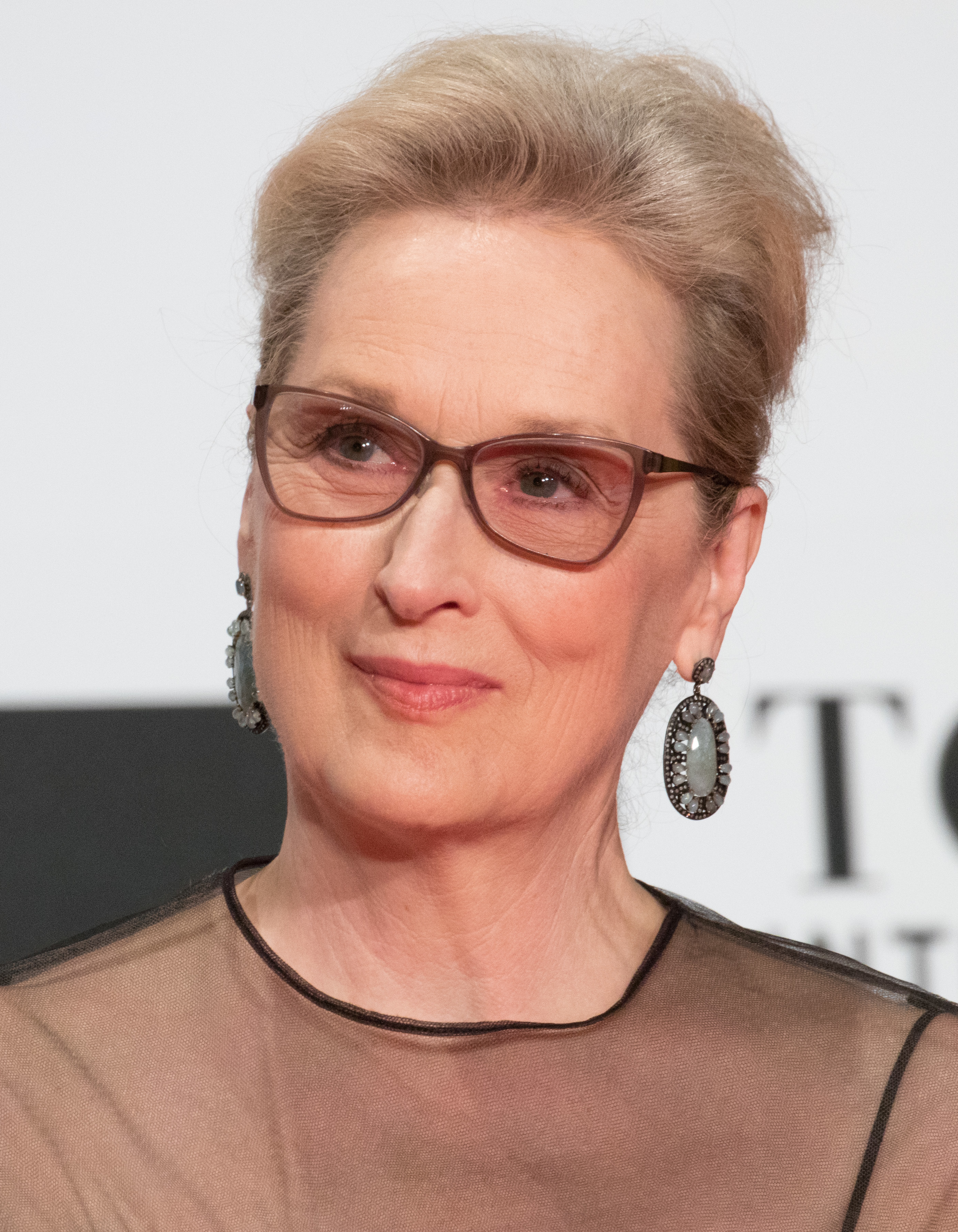
The performances of Nicolas Cage, Chris Cooper and Meryl Streep garnered critical acclaim, earning them Academy Award nominations for Best Actor, Best Supporting Actor and Best Supporting Actress respectively, with Cooper winning his category.

On Rotten Tomatoes, Adaptation has an approval rating of 90% based on 208 reviews, with an average rating of 8.4/10. The site's critical consensus reads, "Dizzyingly original, the loopy, multi-layered Adaptation is both funny and thought-provoking." Metacritic, which uses a weighted average, assigned the film a score of 83 out of 100, based on 40 critics, indicating "universal acclaim". Audiences polled by CinemaScore gave the film an average grade of "C" on an A+ to F scale.

Roger Ebert of the Chicago Sun-Times gave the film four out of four stars, calling it "bewilderingly brilliant and entertaining". He wrote that the film "leaves you breathless with curiosity, as it teases itself with the directions it might take. To watch the film is to be actively involved in the challenge of its creation." He later added the film to his "Great Movies" canon, and in 2009, he named it one of the best films of the decade. Peter Travers of Rolling Stone also gave the film a four-star rating, writing, "Screenwriting this smart, inventive, passionate and rip-roaringly funny is a rare species. So all praise to Charlie Kaufman, working with director Spike Jonze to create the most original and outrageous film comedy since the two first teamed on Being John Malkovich, in 1999." Wesley Morris of The Boston Globe wrote, "This is epic, funny, tragic, demanding, strange, original, boldly sincere filmmaking. And the climax, the portion that either sinks the entire movie or self-critically explains how so many others derail, is bananas."

David Ansen of Newsweek wrote that Meryl Streep had not "been this much fun to watch in years", while Mike Clark of USA Today gave a largely negative review, mainly criticizing the ending: "Too smart to ignore but a little too smugly superior to like, this could be a movie that ends up slapping its target audience in the face by shooting itself in the foot." Stanley Kauffmann of The New Republic wrote, "Adaptation is almost juvenile showing off—daring to make a film that is in search of a script".

== Accolades ==
Award	Category	Nominee(s)	Result	Ref.
Academy Awards	Best Actor	Nicolas Cage	Nominated	
Academy Awards	Best Supporting Actor	Chris Cooper	Won	
Academy Awards	Best Supporting Actress	Meryl Streep	Nominated	
Academy Awards	Best Adapted Screenplay	Charlie Kaufman	Nominated	
AARP Movies for Grownups Awards	Best Actress	Meryl Streep	Won	
American Cinema Editors Awards	Best Edited Feature Film – Comedy or Musical	Eric Zumbrunnen	Nominated	
American Film Institute Awards	Top 10 Movies of the Year		Won	
Awards Circuit Community Awards (2002)	Best Motion Picture	Jonathan Demme, Vincent Landay, and Edward Saxon	Nominated	
Awards Circuit Community Awards (2002)	Best Director	Spike Jonze	Nominated	
Awards Circuit Community Awards (2002)	Best Actor in a Leading Role	Nicolas Cage	Nominated	
Awards Circuit Community Awards (2002)	Best Actor in a Supporting Role	Chris Cooper	Nominated	
Awards Circuit Community Awards (2002)	Best Actress in a Supporting Role	Meryl Streep	Won	
Awards Circuit Community Awards (2002)	Best Adapted Screenplay	Charlie Kaufman and Donald Kaufman	Won	
Awards Circuit Community Awards (2002)	Best Achievement in Film Editing	Eric Zumbrunnen	Nominated	
Awards Circuit Community Awards (2002)	Best Cast Ensemble	Nicolas Cage, Chris Cooper, Brian Cox, Cara Seymour, Meryl Streep, and Tilda Swinton	Nominated	
Awards Circuit Community Awards (2012)	Best Adapted Screenplay of the Decade	Charlie Kaufman and Donald Kaufman	Runner-up	
Belgian Film Critics Association Awards	Grand Prix	Spike Jonze	Nominated	
Berlin International Film Festival	Golden Bear	Spike Jonze	Nominated	
Berlin International Film Festival	Grand Jury Prize	Spike Jonze	Won	
Boston Society of Film Critics Awards	Best Screenplay	Charlie Kaufman and Donald Kaufman	Won	
British Academy Film Awards	Best Actor in a Leading Role	Nicolas Cage	Nominated	
British Academy Film Awards	Best Actor in a Supporting Role	Chris Cooper	Nominated	
British Academy Film Awards	Best Actress in a Supporting Role	Meryl Streep	Nominated	
British Academy Film Awards	Best Adapted Screenplay	Charlie Kaufman and Donald Kaufman	Won	
British Comedy Awards	Best Comedy Film		Nominated	
Central Ohio Film Critics Association Awards	Best Picture		2nd Place	
Central Ohio Film Critics Association Awards	Best Supporting Actor	Chris Cooper	Won	
Central Ohio Film Critics Association Awards	Best Adapted Screenplay	Charlie Kaufman and Donald Kaufman	Won	
Chicago Film Critics Association Awards	Best Film		Nominated	
Chicago Film Critics Association Awards	Best Actor	Nicolas Cage	Nominated	
Chicago Film Critics Association Awards	Best Supporting Actor	Chris Cooper	Nominated	
Chicago Film Critics Association Awards	Best Supporting Actress	Meryl Streep	Won	
Chicago Film Critics Association Awards	Best Screenplay	Charlie Kaufman and Donald Kaufman	Won	
Chicago Film Critics Association Awards	Most Promising Performer	Maggie Gyllenhaal (also for Confessions of a Dangerous Mind and Secretary)	Won	
Chlotrudis Awards	Best Actor	Nicolas Cage	Nominated	
Chlotrudis Awards	Best Supporting Actor (Public Winner)	Chris Cooper	Won	
Chlotrudis Awards	Best Original Screenplay (Public Winner)	Charlie Kaufman and Donald Kaufman	Won	
Critics' Choice Movie Awards	Top 10 Films		Won	
Critics' Choice Movie Awards	Best Picture		Nominated	
Critics' Choice Movie Awards	Best Supporting Actor	Chris Cooper	Won	
Critics' Choice Movie Awards	Best Supporting Actress	Meryl Streep	Nominated	
Critics' Choice Movie Awards	Best Writer	Charlie Kaufman (also for Confessions of a Dangerous Mind)	Won	
Dallas-Fort Worth Film Critics Association Awards	Top 10 Films		7th Place	
Dallas-Fort Worth Film Critics Association Awards	Best Film		Nominated	
Dallas-Fort Worth Film Critics Association Awards	Best Actor	Nicolas Cage	Nominated	
Dallas-Fort Worth Film Critics Association Awards	Best Supporting Actor	Chris Cooper	Won	
Dallas-Fort Worth Film Critics Association Awards	Best Supporting Actress	Meryl Streep	Nominated	
Dublin Film Critics' Circle Awards	Best Film of the Decade		15th Place	
Florida Film Critics Circle Awards	Best Film		Won	
Florida Film Critics Circle Awards	Best Supporting Actor	Chris Cooper	Won	
Florida Film Critics Circle Awards	Best Supporting Actress	Meryl Streep	Won	
Florida Film Critics Circle Awards	Best Screenplay	Charlie Kaufman and Donald Kaufman	Won	
Gold Derby Awards (2002)	Best Lead Actor	Nicolas Cage	Nominated	
Gold Derby Awards (2002)	Best Supporting Actor	Chris Cooper	Won	
Gold Derby Awards (2002)	Best Supporting Actress	Meryl Streep	Won	
Gold Derby Awards (2002)	Best Adapted Screenplay	Charlie Kaufman and Donald Kaufman	Won	
Gold Derby Awards (2002)	Best Ensemble Cast	Nicolas Cage, Chris Cooper, Brian Cox, Cara Seymour, Meryl Streep, and Tilda Swinton	Nominated	
Gold Derby Awards (2009)	Best Supporting Actor of the Decade	Chris Cooper	Nominated	
Gold Derby Awards (2009)	Best Supporting Actress of the Decade	Meryl Streep	Nominated	
Gold Derby Awards (2009)	Best Adapted Screenplay of the Decade	Charlie Kaufman and Donald Kaufman	Nominated	
Golden Globe Awards	Best Motion Picture – Musical or Comedy		Nominated	
Golden Globe Awards	Best Actor in a Motion Picture – Musical or Comedy	Nicolas Cage	Nominated	
Golden Globe Awards	Best Supporting Actor – Motion Picture	Chris Cooper	Won	
Golden Globe Awards	Best Supporting Actress – Motion Picture	Meryl Streep	Won	
Golden Globe Awards	Best Director – Motion Picture	Spike Jonze	Nominated	
Golden Globe Awards	Best Screenplay – Motion Picture	Charlie Kaufman and Donald Kaufman	Nominated	
Golden Reel Awards	Best Sound Editing in a Feature – Music – Feature Film	Adam Milo Smalley	Nominated	
Golden Schmoes Awards	Best Comedy of the Year		Won	
Golden Schmoes Awards	Best Director of the Year	Spike Jonze	Nominated	
Golden Schmoes Awards	Best Actor of the Year	Nicolas Cage	Nominated	
Golden Schmoes Awards	Best Supporting Actor of the Year	Chris Cooper	Nominated	
Golden Schmoes Awards	Best Supporting Actress of the Year	Meryl Streep	Nominated	
Golden Schmoes Awards	Best Screenplay of the Year	Charlie Kaufman	Won	
Golden Schmoes Awards	Trippiest Movie of the Year		Nominated	
Golden Schmoes Awards	Favorite Movie Poster of the Year		Nominated	
Golden Trailer Awards	Best Comedy		Nominated	
Golden Trailer Awards	Best Drama		Nominated	
International Online Cinema Awards	Best Motion Picture		Nominated	
International Online Cinema Awards	Best Actor	Nicolas Cage	Nominated	
International Online Cinema Awards	Best Supporting Actor	Chris Cooper	Won	
International Online Cinema Awards	Best Supporting Actress	Meryl Streep	Nominated	
International Online Cinema Awards	Best Adapted Screenplay	Charlie Kaufman and Donald Kaufman	Won	
International Online Cinema Awards	Best Film Editing	Eric Zumbrunnen	Nominated	
International Online Cinema Awards	Best Ensemble Cast		Nominated	
Italian Online Movie Awards	Best Supporting Actor	Chris Cooper	Nominated	
Kansas City Film Critics Circle Awards	Best Supporting Actor	Chris Cooper	Won	
Las Vegas Film Critics Society Awards	Best Actor	Nicolas Cage	Nominated	
Las Vegas Film Critics Society Awards	Best Supporting Actor	Chris Cooper	Nominated	
Las Vegas Film Critics Society Awards	Best Screenplay	Charlie Kaufman and Donald Kaufman	Nominated	
London Film Critics Circle Awards	Actor of the Year	Nicolas Cage	Nominated	
London Film Critics Circle Awards	Actress of the Year	Meryl Streep	Nominated	
London Film Critics Circle Awards	Screenwriter of the Year	Charlie Kaufman	Nominated	
Los Angeles Film Critics Association Awards	Best Supporting Actor	Chris Cooper	Won	
Los Angeles Film Critics Association Awards	Best Screenplay	Charlie Kaufman and Donald Kaufman	Runner-up	
National Board of Review Awards	Top 10 Films		5th Place	
National Board of Review Awards	Best Supporting Actor	Chris Cooper	Won	
National Board of Review Awards	Best Screenplay	Charlie Kaufman (also for Confessions of a Dangerous Mind and Human Nature)	Won	
National Society of Film Critics Awards	Best Supporting Actor	Chris Cooper	2nd Place	
New York Film Critics Circle Awards	Best Supporting Actor	Chris Cooper	Runner-up	
New York Film Critics Circle Awards	Best Screenplay	Charlie Kaufman and Donald Kaufman	Won	
Online Film & Television Association Awards	Best Picture	Jonathan Demme, Vincent Landay, and Edward Saxon	Nominated	
Online Film & Television Association Awards	Best Actor	Nicolas Cage	Nominated	
Online Film & Television Association Awards	Best Supporting Actor	Chris Cooper	Won	
Online Film & Television Association Awards	Best Supporting Actress	Meryl Streep	Won	
Online Film & Television Association Awards	Best Adapted Screenplay	Charlie Kaufman and Donald Kaufman	Won	
Online Film & Television Association Awards	Best Casting	Justine Arteta and Kim Davis-Wagner	Won	
Online Film & Television Association Awards	Best Ensemble		Nominated	
Online Film Critics Society Awards	Top 10 Films		4th Place	
Online Film Critics Society Awards	Best Picture		Nominated	
Online Film Critics Society Awards	Best Director	Spike Jonze	Nominated	
Online Film Critics Society Awards	Best Actor	Nicolas Cage	Nominated	
Online Film Critics Society Awards	Best Supporting Actor	Chris Cooper	Nominated	
Online Film Critics Society Awards	Best Supporting Actress	Meryl Streep	Nominated	
Online Film Critics Society Awards	Best Adapted Screenplay	Charlie Kaufman and Donald Kaufman	Won	
Online Film Critics Society Awards	Best Editing	Eric Zumbrunnen	Nominated	
Online Film Critics Society Awards	Best Ensemble		Nominated	
PEN Center USA West Literary Awards	Best Screenplay	Charlie Kaufman and Donald Kaufman	Won	
Phoenix Film Critics Society Awards	Best Actor in a Leading Role	Nicolas Cage	Nominated	
Phoenix Film Critics Society Awards	Best Actor in a Supporting Role	Chris Cooper	Nominated	
Phoenix Film Critics Society Awards	Best Actress in a Supporting Role	Meryl Streep	Nominated	
Phoenix Film Critics Society Awards	Best Adapted Screenplay	Charlie Kaufman and Donald Kaufman	Nominated	
Phoenix Film Critics Society Awards	Best Acting Ensemble		Nominated	
Producers Guild of America Awards	Outstanding Producer of Theatrical Motion Pictures	Edward Saxon, Jonathan Demme, and Vincent Landay	Nominated	
Russian Guild of Film Critics Awards	Best Foreign Actress	Meryl Streep	Nominated	
San Diego Film Critics Society Awards	Best Director	Spike Jonze	Nominated	
San Diego Film Critics Society Awards	Best Supporting Actor	Chris Cooper	Won	
San Diego Film Critics Society Awards	Best Screenplay – Adapted	Charlie Kaufman and Donald Kaufman	Won	
San Francisco Film Critics Circle Awards	Best Supporting Actor	Chris Cooper	Won	
Sant Jordi Awards	Best Foreign Actress	Meryl Streep	Nominated	
Satellite Awards	Best Motion Picture – Musical or Comedy		Nominated	
Satellite Awards	Best Actor in a Motion Picture – Musical or Comedy	Nicolas Cage	Nominated	
Satellite Awards	Best Supporting Actor in a Motion Picture – Musical or Comedy	Chris Cooper	Nominated	
Satellite Awards	Best Supporting Actress in a Motion Picture – Musical or Comedy	Meryl Streep	Nominated	
Satellite Awards	Best Screenplay – Adapted	Charlie Kaufman and Donald Kaufman	Won	
Satellite Awards	Best Film Editing	Eric Zumbrunnen	Nominated	
Screen Actors Guild Awards	Outstanding Performance by a Cast in a Motion Picture	Nicolas Cage, Chris Cooper, Brian Cox, Cara Seymour, Meryl Streep, and Tilda Swinton	Nominated	
Screen Actors Guild Awards	Outstanding Performance by a Male Actor in a Leading Role	Nicolas Cage	Nominated	
Screen Actors Guild Awards	Outstanding Performance by a Male Actor in a Supporting Role	Chris Cooper	Nominated	
Seattle Film Critics Awards	Best Supporting Actor	Chris Cooper	Won	
Southeastern Film Critics Association Awards	Best Picture		4th Place	
Southeastern Film Critics Association Awards	Best Supporting Actor	Chris Cooper	Won	
Southeastern Film Critics Association Awards	Best Supporting Actress	Meryl Streep	Won	
Southeastern Film Critics Association Awards	Best Adapted Screenplay	Charlie Kaufman	Won	
Toronto Film Critics Association Awards	Best Picture		Won	
Toronto Film Critics Association Awards	Best Actor	Nicolas Cage	Won	
Toronto Film Critics Association Awards	Best Supporting Actor	Chris Cooper	Won	
Toronto Film Critics Association Awards	Best Screenplay	Charlie Kaufman and Donald Kaufman	Won	
USC Scripter Awards		Charlie Kaufman (screenwriter); Susan Orlean (author)	Nominated	
Utah Film Critics Association Awards	Best Supporting Actor	Chris Cooper	Won	
Utah Film Critics Association Awards	Best Supporting Actress	Meryl Streep	Won	
Utah Film Critics Association Awards	Best Screenplay	Charlie Kaufman	Runner-up	
Vancouver Film Critics Circle Awards	Best Actor	Nicolas Cage	Nominated	
Vancouver Film Critics Circle Awards	Best Supporting Actor	Chris Cooper	Won	
Vancouver Film Critics Circle Awards	Best Supporting Actress	Meryl Streep	Nominated	
Village Voice Film Poll	Best Film		3rd Place	
Village Voice Film Poll	Best Lead Performance	Nicolas Cage	9th Place	
Village Voice Film Poll	Best Supporting Performance	Chris Cooper	Won	
Village Voice Film Poll	Best Adapted Screenplay	Charlie Kaufman	Won	
Visual Effects Society Awards	Best Performance by an Actor in an Effects Film	Nicolas Cage	Nominated	
Washington D.C. Area Film Critics Association Awards	Best Film		Runner-up	
Washington D.C. Area Film Critics Association Awards	Best Director	Spike Jonze	Won (Note: Tied with Sam Mendes for Road to Perdition and Denzel Washington for Antwone Fisher.)	
Washington D.C. Area Film Critics Association Awards	Best Supporting Actor	Chris Cooper	Won (Note: Tied with Dennis Haysbert for Far from Heaven.)	
Washington D.C. Area Film Critics Association Awards	Best Adapted Screenplay	Charlie Kaufman	Won	
Writers Guild of America Awards	Best Adapted Screenplay	Charlie Kaufman and Donald Kaufman	Nominated	

In a 2006 survey, the Writers Guild of America (WGA) named Adaptation the 77th best movie screenplay ever written. In 2021, the WGA ranked the screenplay 11th in its 101 Greatest Screenplays of the 21st Century (so far). In 2025, the film ranked 27th on The New York Times's list "The 100 Best Movies of the 21st Century" and was one of the films voted for in the "Readers' Choice" edition of the list, finishing at number 135.

=== Response from Susan Orlean ===
Having been sent the screenplay for approval, Orlean strongly opposed the making of the film; she ended up reluctantly approving its production and was ultimately very impressed by the result. In 2012, she said, "[reading the screenplay] was a complete shock. My first reaction was 'Absolutely not!' They had to get my permission and I just said: 'No! Are you kidding? This is going to ruin my career!' Very wisely, they didn't really pressure me. They told me that everybody else had agreed and I somehow got emboldened. It was certainly scary to see the movie for the first time. It took a while for me to get over the idea that I had been insane to agree to it, but I love the movie now."

Orlean called Streep's portrayal of her "one of my favorite performances by her" and appreciated that her performance was based not on the real Orlean but on how Streep imagined Orlean based on The Orchid Thief. Despite the film's fictional parts, Orlean praised its fidelity to the book's spirit: "What I admire the most is that it's very true to the book's themes of life and obsession, and there are also insights into things which are much more subtle in the book about longing, and about disappointment."

== See also ==
Films

- Identity (2003), a film starring John Cusack containing plot elements similar to The 3, the fictional script by Donald Kaufman's character.
- Three (2006), a film (based on Ted Dekker's eponymous novel) that bears a distinct resemblance to The 3.
- List of films featuring fictional films

Literature

- Levinson, Julie (Spring 2007). "Adaptation, Metafiction, Self-Creation". Genre: Forms of Discourse and Culture. 40: 1.
- McKee, Robert (1997). Story: Substance, Structure, Style and the Principles of Screenwriting.
- Orlean, Susan (1998). The Orchid Thief: A True Story of Beauty and Obsession.
