= David Hennings =

American cinematographer

David Hennings is an American cinematographer.

== Career ==
In May 2008, Hennings was announced to be serving as cinematographer for Hannah Montana: The Movie.

For his work on The Magic of David Copperfield... In China, Hennings received a nomination for the Primetime Emmy Award for Outstanding Technical Direction, Camerawork, Video Control for a Special.

== Filmography ==
=== Film ===
Year	Title	Director	Notes	Ref(s)
1996	D3: The Mighty Ducks	Robert Lieberman		
1998	Meet the Deedles	Steve Boyum		
1998	Very Bad Things	Peter Berg		
2002	Blue Crush	John Stockwell		
2002	American Girl	Jordan Brady		
2004	You Got Served	Chris Stokes		
2004	Breakin' All the Rules	Daniel Taplitz		
2005	Ice Princess	Tim Fywell		
2005	Underclassman	Marcos Siega		
2008	Strange Wilderness	Fred Wolf		
2009	Hannah Montana: The Movie	Peter Chelsom		
2010	You Again	Andy Fickman		
2011	Horrible Bosses	Seth Gordon		
2013	Last Vegas	Jon Turteltaub		
2015	Home Sweet Hell	Anthony Burns		
2015	The DUFF	Ari Sandel		
2016	Get a Job	Dylan Kidd		
2017	Speech & Debate	Dan Harris		
2018	When We First Met	Ari Sandel		
2022	About Fate	Maryus Vaysberg		
2022	The Curse of Bridge Hollow	Jeff Wadlow		

=== Television ===
Year	Title	Notes	Ref(s)
1996	Titanic	Miniseries, 2 episodes	
1997	Asteroid	Television film; co-cinematographer with Thomas Del Ruth	
2000	Cheaters	Television film	
2000	Strong Medicine	1 episode	
2001	Boycott	Television film	
2002	Second String	Television film	
2006	South Beach	4 episodes	
2007-2008	K-Ville	10 episodes	
2009	Modern Family	1 episode	
2011	Breaking In	1 episode	
2012	Ben and Kate	1 episode	
2013	The Goldbergs	1 episode	
2014	Enlisted	2 episodes	
2014-2015	Marry Me	17 episodes	
2015	Sneaky Pete	1 episode	
2016	Grave	10 episodes	
2017	Imaginary Mary	1 episode	
2017	White Famous	4 episodes	
2017-2019	Claws	16 episodes	
2020	Lincoln Rhyme: Hunt for the Bone Collector	9 episodes	
2021	Christmas...Again?!	Television film	
2023	Will Trent	6 episodes	
2023	The Night Agent	2 episodes	
