= New York Film Critics Circle Award for Best First Film =

The New York Film Critics Circle Award for Best First Film is an award given by the New York Film Critics Circle, honoring gifted filmmakers through their first feature film.

== Winners ==
=== 1990s ===
| Year | Winner | Director(s) |
|---|---|---|
| 1997 | In the Company of Men | Neil LaBute |
| 1998 | Love and Death on Long Island | Richard Kwietniowski |
| 1999 | Being John Malkovich | Spike Jonze |

=== 2000s ===
| Year | Winner | Director(s) |
|---|---|---|
| 2000 | George Washington | David Gordon Green |
| 2001 | In the Bedroom | Todd Field |
| 2002 | Roger Dodger | Dylan Kidd |
| 2003 | American Splendor | Shari Springer Berman and Robert Pulcini |
| 2004 | Maria Full of Grace | Joshua Marston |
| 2005 | Capote | Bennett Miller |
| 2006 | Half Nelson | Ryan Fleck |
| 2007 | Away from Her | Sarah Polley |
| 2008 | Frozen River | Courtney Hunt |
| 2009 | Hunger | Steve McQueen |

=== 2010s ===
| Year | Winner | Director(s) |
|---|---|---|
| 2010 | Animal Kingdom | David Michôd |
| 2011 | Margin Call | J. C. Chandor |
| 2012 | How to Survive a Plague | David France |
| 2013 | Fruitvale Station | Ryan Coogler |
| 2014 | The Babadook | Jennifer Kent |
| 2015 | Son of Saul | László Nemes |
| 2016 | The Edge of Seventeen | Kelly Fremon Craig |
| 2016 | Krisha | Trey Edward Shults |
| 2017 | Get Out | Jordan Peele |
| 2018 | Eighth Grade | Bo Burnham |
| 2019 | Atlantics | Mati Diop |

=== 2020s ===
| Year | Winner | Director(s) |
|---|---|---|
| 2020 | The 40-Year-Old Version | Radha Blank |
| 2021 | The Lost Daughter | Maggie Gyllenhaal |
| 2022 | Aftersun | Charlotte Wells |
| 2023 | Past Lives | Celine Song |
| 2024 | Janet Planet | Annie Baker |
| 2025 | Eephus | Carson Lund |

== See also ==
- Independent Spirit Award for Best First Feature
