= Get a Job (2016 film) =

- Theatrical release poster
- Directed by: Dylan Kidd
- Written by: Kyle Pennekamp; Scott Turpel
- Produced by: Michael Shamberg; Stacey Sher
- Starring: Miles Teller; Anna Kendrick; Brandon T. Jackson; Nicholas Braun; Christopher Mintz-Plasse; Marcia Gay Harden; Alison Brie; Bruce Davison; Bryan Cranston
- Cinematography: David Hennings
- Edited by: Jeff Betancourt
- Music by: Christian Moder
- Production companies: CBS Films; Double Feature Films
- Distributed by: Lionsgate Premiere
- Release date: March 25, 2016 (United States)
- Running time: 83 minutes
- Country: United States
- Language: English
- Box office: $23,910

Get a Job is a 2016 American comedy film directed by Dylan Kidd and written by Kyle Pennekamp and Scott Turpel, about a group of friends who graduate from college and their efforts to secure employment. The film stars Miles Teller, Anna Kendrick, Brandon T. Jackson, Nicholas Braun, Christopher Mintz-Plasse, Marcia Gay Harden, Alison Brie and Bryan Cranston.

Shot in 2012, the film remained unreleased until March 25, 2016, when it received a limited and video on demand release by Lionsgate Premiere and CBS Films.

== Plot ==
After recently graduating from college, millennial Will Davis is set to work in video production for LA Weekly but when he arrives for his first day, the company has downsized. Will needs to find another job quickly to appease his parents and success-driven girlfriend Jillian and to cover rent for the house he shares with his three friends: Luke, Ethan, and Charlie.

Will asks his father for money, only to learn that Roger Davis recently lost his job of 30 years. In desperation, Will takes a job as the night manager for a disreputable motel. On his first night, he allows the pimp Skeezy D to use the motel for his prostitution ring, causing him to lose his job when the police bust it.

Meanwhile, Will's slacker roommates also struggle to fulfill their goals. Luke believes he has gained employment as a stock trader but instead finds himself working as a poorly treated office clerk. Ethan fails to gain momentum with his questionable "iStalkU" mobile app idea. And stoner Charlie takes an undesirable job as a 6th grade chemistry teacher.

Will interviews at a reputable executive job placement firm and impresses the hiring manager, gaining employment as a video resume creator. Roger meanwhile struggles to find new employment, believing his age is to blame. Will thrives and is soon offered a promotion after gaining the favor of his narcissistic manager Katherine. Jillian loses her job and is forced to move in with Will and his friends.

A video of Skeezy D that Will uploaded to YouTube goes viral, attracting the attention of a startup company that offers him a job. Meanwhile, Luke becomes a stock trader but continues to struggle, Charlie begins coaching the school's basketball team, and Ethan fails to properly pitch his app idea to Warren Buffett. Roger begins using a hipster coffee shop as a makeshift office while becoming obsessed with gaining an interview at IBM.

Unbeknownst to Roger, Will films him on a drunken rant about his job skills and later turns it into a video resume. Roger is nearly arrested for harassing the IBM hiring manager but is saved by Will and his friends. It results in his gaining an interview and obtaining his dream employment.

With the support of Jillian, Will turns down the promotion and other job offers, instead opting to start his own video production company and he finds success. Luke eventually does well as a stock trader, Charlie realizes that the participation trophy ethos of his generation did more harm than good and finds new motivation, and Ethan finally achieves success with his app.

== Cast ==
- Miles Teller as Will Davis
- Anna Kendrick as Jillian Stewart
- Brandon T. Jackson as Luke
- Christopher Mintz-Plasse as Ethan
- Nicholas Braun as Charlie
- Cameron Richardson as Tara, The Stripper
- Marcia Gay Harden as Katherine Dunn
- Alison Brie as Tanya Sellers
- Bryan Cranston as Roger Davis
- Jorge Garcia as Fernando, The Janitor
- John C. McGinley as Hank Diller
- John Cho as Brian Bender
- Greg Germann as Fernando, The Accountant
- Bruce Davison as Lawrence Wilheimer
- Ethan Dizon as Kwan
- Jay Pharoah as "Skeezy D"
- Aaron Hill as Jason
- Marc Maron as Motel Manager
- Ravi Patel as Wick
- Jeryl Prescott as Assistant Principal
- Sean O'Bryan as Alan Fredricks, Wilheimer Client
- Maximiliano Hernández as Businessman, Wilheimer Client
- Mimi Gianopulos as Cammy

== Production ==
In January 2012, it was announced that Dylan Kidd was attached to direct the film from a screenplay by Kyle Pennekamp and Scott Turpel. It was also announced that Miles Teller, Anna Kendrick, Bryan Cranston, Christopher Mintz-Plasse, Jay Pharoah, and Jesse Eisenberg were all in negotiations to star in the film.

In March 2012, CBS Films confirmed the casting of Cranston, Kendrick, Teller, and Pharaoh. As well as announcing that Nicholas Braun, Alison Brie and Brandon T. Jackson had all been cast in the film. In March 2012, John Cho was confirmed to be in the film. Principal photography on the film began on March 12, 2012, in Los Angeles, California.

== Release ==
After two years in September 2014, Anna Kendrick remarked that the film might never see the light of day due to distribution issues. The film was eventually released on March 25, 2016, in a limited release and through video on demand by CBS Films and Lionsgate Premiere.

== Reception ==
On the review aggregator website Rotten Tomatoes, 9% of 23 critics' reviews are positive, with an average rating of 3.8/10. The website's consensus reads: "Inauthentic and unfunny, Get a Job is paltry to the point that its long-delayed release feels purely the result of its wasted cast having been promoted to greater fame all these years later." Metacritic, which uses a weighted average, assigned the film a score of 31 out of 100, based on 10 critics, indicating "generally unfavorable" reviews.

Jon Frosch of The Hollywood Reporter gave the film a negative review writing, in comparison to We Are Your Friends: "Those guys might not have had college degrees, but they had attitude, hustle and a bit of soul — all things the shallow, insipid young characters in Get a Job, as well as the film itself, are sorely missing". Mike D'Angelo of The A.V. Club wrote, "Honestly, it would probably have been better for almost everyone involved — especially Kidd — had Get A Job been left on the shelf permanently. All it can do now is embarrass some young actors who’ve already moved on to bigger and better things."
