= 2002 New York Film Critics Circle Awards =

68th New York Film Critics Circle Awards

New York Film Critics Circle Awards
- Date: January 12, 2003

Highlights
- Best Film: Far from Heaven, Spirited Away (Sen to Chihiro no kamikakushi) (animated)
- Best Direction: Todd Haynes; Far from Heaven
- Best Actor: Daniel Day-Lewis; Gangs of New York
- Best Actress: Diane Lane; Unfaithful

The 68th New York Film Critics Circle Awards, honoring the best in film for 2002, were announced on 16 December 2002 and presented on 12 January 2003 by the New York Film Critics Circle.

== Winners ==
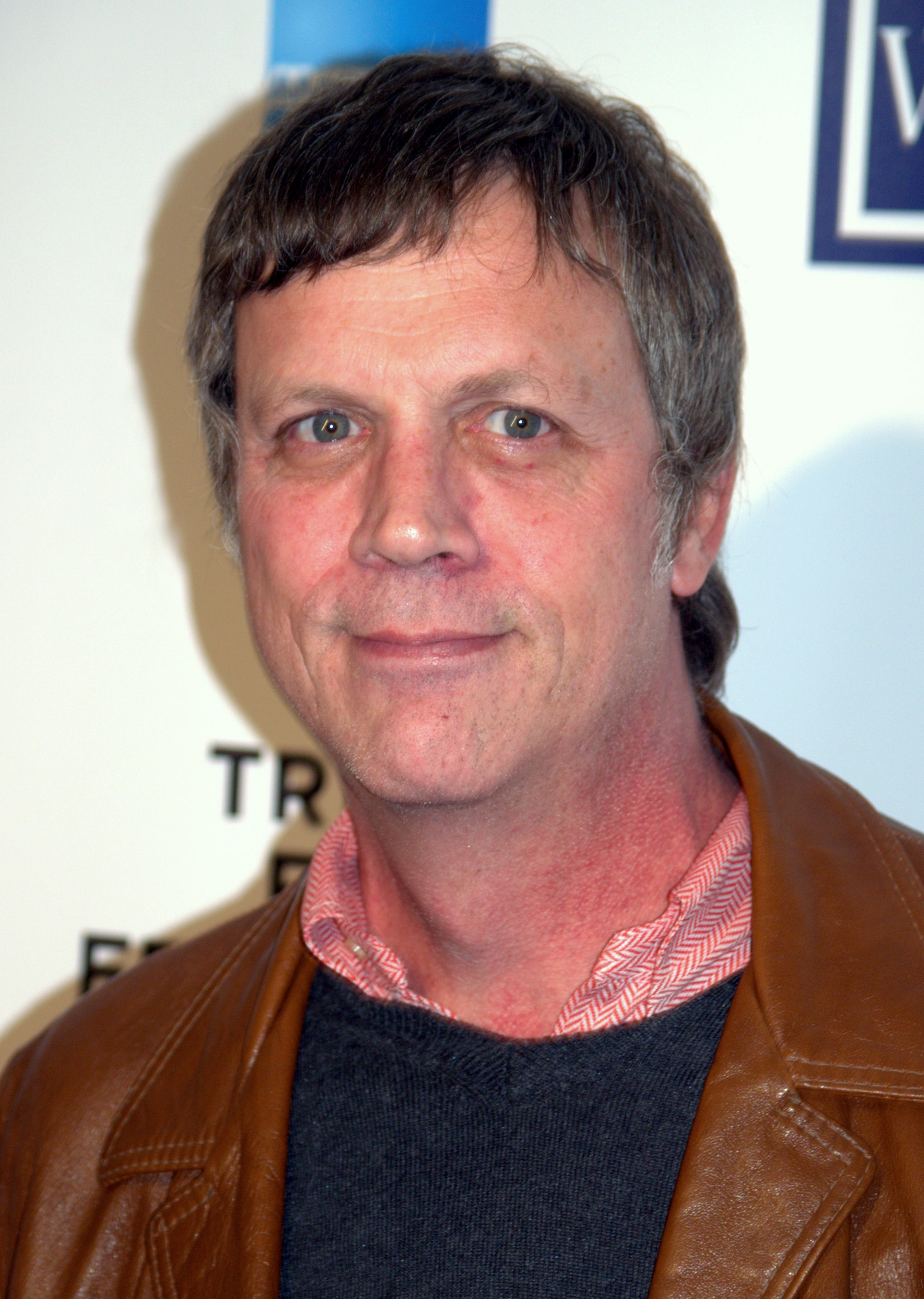
Todd Haynes, Best Director winner

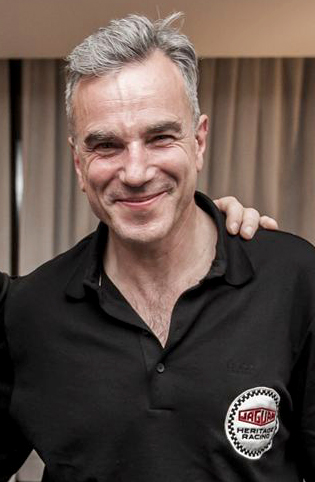
Daniel Day-Lewis, Best Actor winner

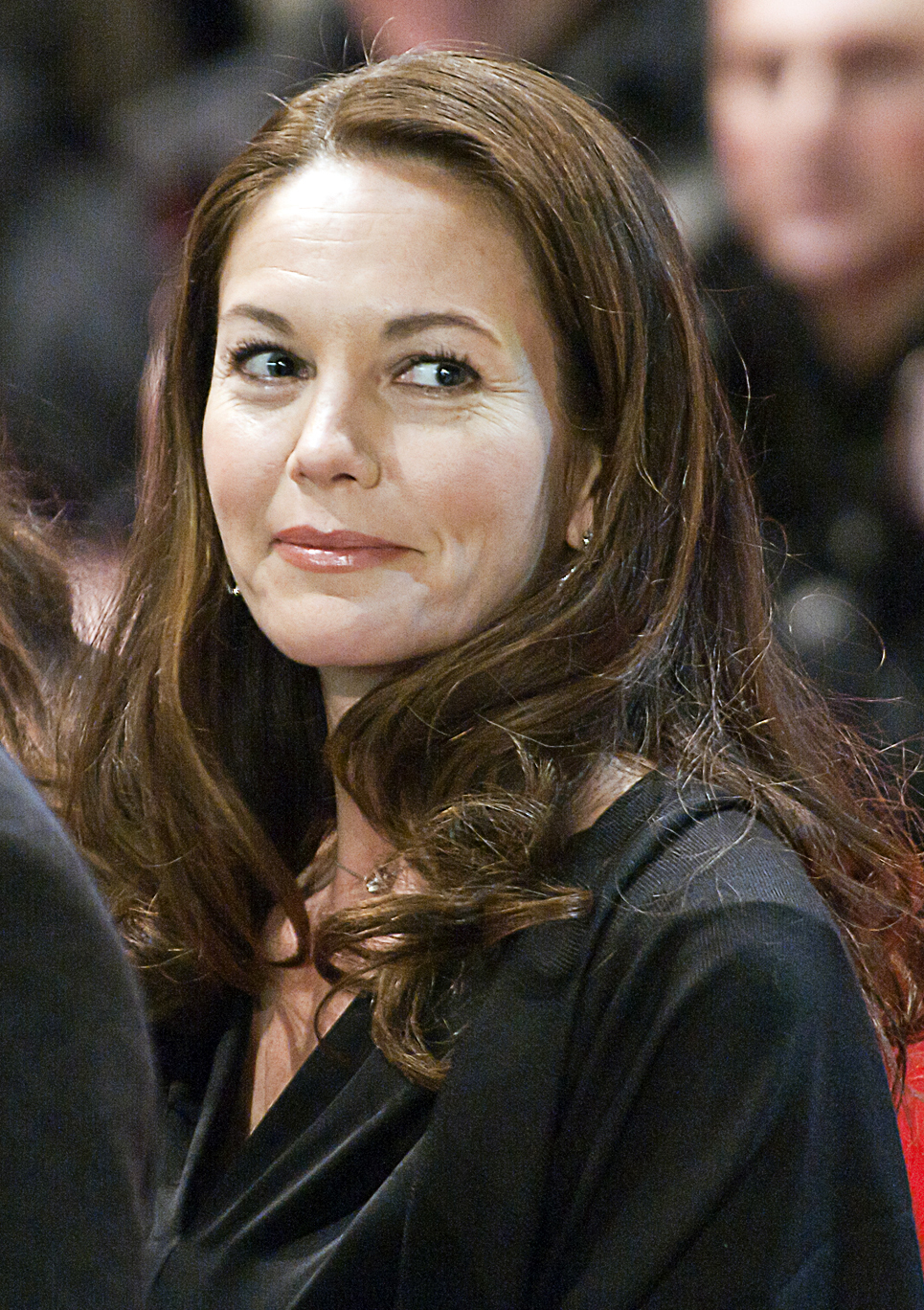
Diane Lane, Best Actress winner

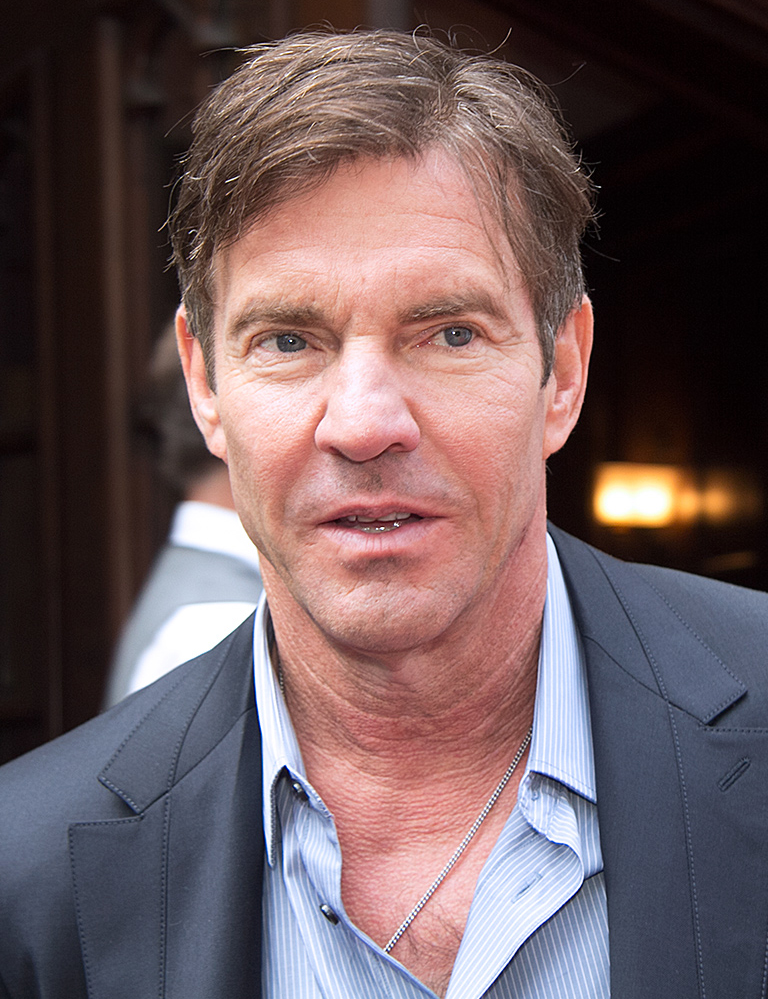
Dennis Quaid, Best Supporting Actor winner

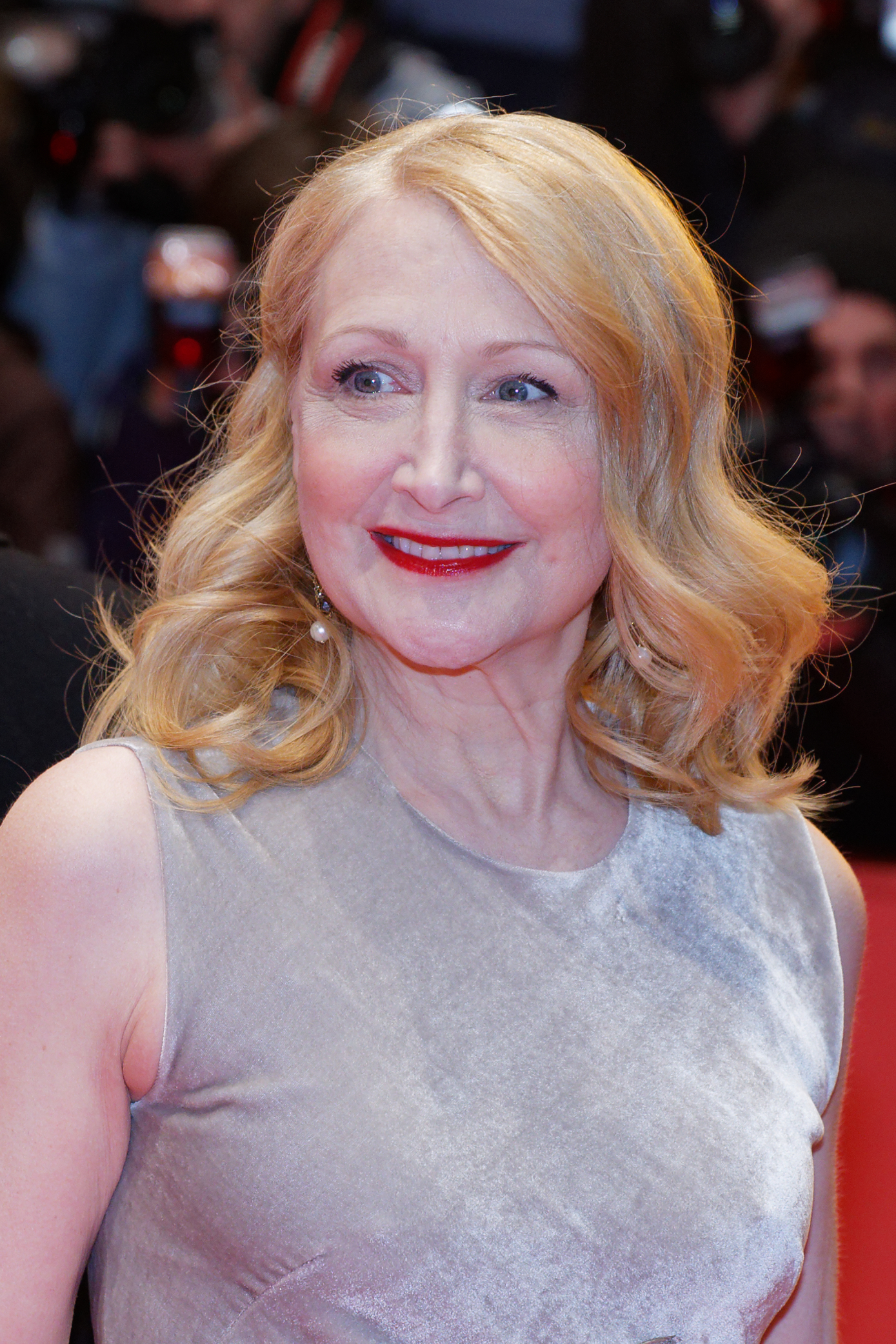
Patricia Clarkson, Best Supporting Actress winner

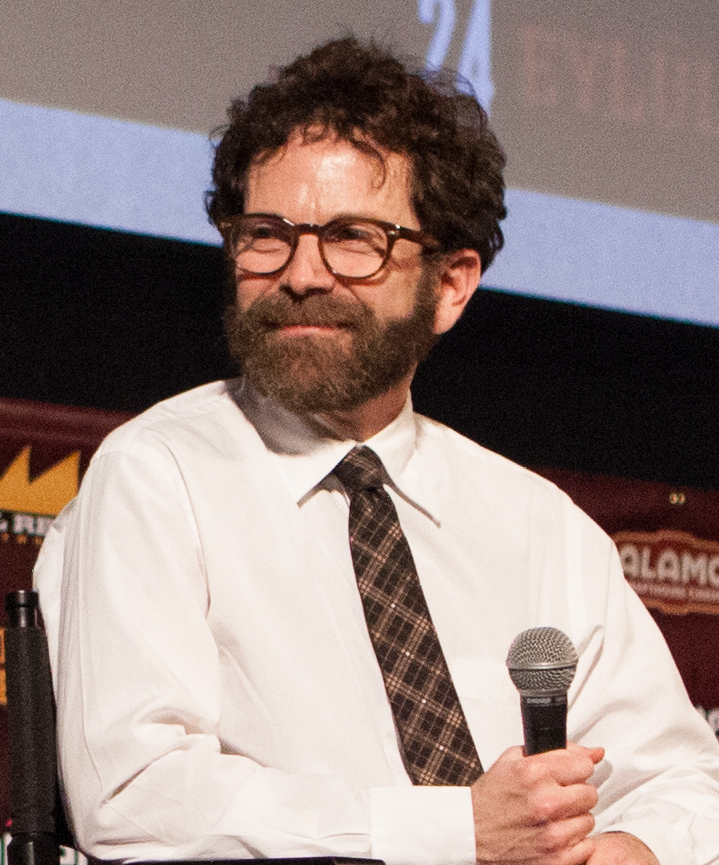
Charlie Kaufman, Best Screenplay winner

- Best Actor:
  - Daniel Day-Lewis – Gangs of New York
  - Runners-up: Jack Nicholson – About Schmidt and Greg Kinnear – Auto Focus
- Best Actress:
  - Diane Lane – Unfaithful
  - Runners-up: Julianne Moore – Far from Heaven and Isabelle Huppert – The Piano Teacher (La pianiste)
- Best Animated Film:
  - Spirited Away (Sen to Chihiro no kamikakushi)
- Best Cinematography:
  - Edward Lachman – Far from Heaven
  - Runners-up: Michael Ballhaus – Gangs of New York and Conrad L. Hall – Road to Perdition
- Best Director:
  - Todd Haynes – Far from Heaven
  - Runners-up: Pedro Almodóvar – Talk to Her (Hable con ella) and Alexander Payne – About Schmidt
- Best Film:
  - Far from Heaven
  - Runners-up: About Schmidt and Talk to Her (Hable con ella)
- Best First Film:
  - Dylan Kidd – Roger Dodger
  - Runners-up: Rob Marshall – Chicago and Zacharias Kunuk – Atanarjuat: The Fast Runner (Atanarjuat)
- Best Foreign Language Film:
  - Y Tu Mamá También • Mexico/United States
  - Runners-up: Talk to Her (Hable con ella) • Spain and Time Out (L'emploi du temps) • France
- Best Non-Fiction Film:
  - Standing in the Shadows of Motown
  - Runners-up: The Kid Stays in the Picture and Bowling for Columbine
- Best Screenplay:
  - Charlie and Donald Kaufman – Adaptation.
  - Runners-up: Alexander Payne and Jim Taylor – About Schmidt and Dylan Kidd – Roger Dodger
- Best Supporting Actor:
  - Dennis Quaid – Far from Heaven
  - Runners-up: Chris Cooper – Adaptation. and Willem Dafoe – Auto Focus
- Best Supporting Actress:
  - Patricia Clarkson – Far from Heaven
  - Runners-up: Parker Posey – Personal Velocity and Hope Davis – About Schmidt
- Special Award:
  - Kino International for the restoration of Metropolis
