= Florida Film Critics Circle Awards 2002 =

Annual US film awards ceremony

7th FFCC Awards

January 3, 2003

Best Film:
Adaptation.

The 7th Florida Film Critics Circle Awards, honoring the best in film for 2002, were announced on 3 January 2003.

== Winners ==
- Best Actor:
  - Daniel Day-Lewis - Gangs of New York as William "Bill" Cutting
- Best Actress:
  - Julianne Moore - Far from Heaven
- Best Animated Film:
  - Spirited Away (Sen to Chihiro no kamikakushi)
- Best Cast:
  - Thirteen Conversations About One Thing
- Best Cinematography:
  - Far from Heaven - Edward Lachman
- Best Director:
  - Martin Scorsese - Gangs of New York
- Best Documentary Film:
  - Bowling for Columbine
- Best Film:
  - Adaptation.
- Best Foreign Language Film:
  - And Your Mother Too (Y Tu Mama Tambien) • Mexico/USA
- Best Screenplay:
  - Adaptation. - Charlie and Donald Kaufman
- Best Supporting Actor:
  - Chris Cooper - Adaptation. as John Laroche
- Best Supporting Actress:
  - Meryl Streep - Adaptation. as Susan Orlean
