= National Board of Review Awards 2002 =

Annual US film awards ceremony

74th NBR Awards

December 4, 2002

Best Film:
The Hours

The 74th National Board of Review Awards, honoring the best in filmmaking in 2002, were announced on 4 December 2002 and given on 14 January 2003.

== Top 10 films ==
1. The Hours
2. Chicago
3. Gangs of New York
4. The Quiet American
5. Adaptation.
6. Rabbit-Proof Fence
7. The Pianist
8. Far from Heaven
9. Thirteen Conversations About One Thing
10. Frida

== Top Foreign Films ==
1. Talk to Her
2. Y Tu Mamá También
3. 8 Women
4. City of God
5. El crimen del Padre Amaro

== Winners ==
- Best Film:
  - The Hours
- Best Foreign Language Film:
  - Hable con ella (Talk to Her), Spain
- Best Actor:
  - Campbell Scott – Roger Dodger
- Best Actress:
  - Julianne Moore – Far from Heaven
- Best Supporting Actor:
  - Chris Cooper – Adaptation.
- Best Supporting Actress:
  - Kathy Bates – About Schmidt
- Best Cast:
  - Nicholas Nickleby
- Breakthrough Performance – Male:
  - Derek Luke – Antwone Fisher
- Breakthrough Performance – Female:
  - Maggie Gyllenhaal – Secretary
- Best Director:
  - Phillip Noyce – The Quiet American and Rabbit-Proof Fence
- Best Debut Director:
  - Rob Marshall – Chicago
- Best Screenplay:
  - Charlie Kaufman – Adaptation., Confessions of a Dangerous Mind and Human Nature
- Best Documentary Feature:
  - Bowling for Columbine
- Best Animated Feature:
  - Sen to Chihiro no Kamikakushi (Spirited Away)
- Best Film Made For Cable TV:
  - The Laramie Project
- Career Achievement Award:
  - Christopher Plummer
- Special Award for Visionary Cinematic Achievement:
  - George Lucas
- Special Filmmaking Achievement:
  - George Clooney, Confessions of a Dangerous Mind
- Career Achievement – Music Composition:
  - Elmer Bernstein
- Career Achievement – Cinematography:
  - Conrad Hall
- Humanitarian Award:
  - Sheila Nevins (HBO)
- William K. Everson Award For Film History:
  - Annette Insdorf, Films and the Holocaust
- Freedom Of Expression:
  - Rabbit-Proof Fence
  - Ararat
  - Bloody Sunday
  - The Grey Zone
- Special Recognition For Excellence In Filmmaking:
  - Frailty
  - The Good Girl
  - The Guys
  - Heaven
  - Igby Goes Down
  - Max
  - Personal Velocity: Three Portraits
  - Real Women Have Curves
  - Roger Dodger
  - Sunshine State
  - Tadpole
  - Tully
