= Toronto Film Critics Association Awards 2002 =

Annual Canadian film awards ceremony

6th TFCA Awards

December 18, 2002

Best Film:
Adaptation.

The 6th Toronto Film Critics Association Awards, honoring the best in film for 2002, were held on 18 December 2002.

== Winners ==
- Best Actor:
  - Nicolas Cage – Adaptation.

Runners-Up: Daniel Day-Lewis – Gangs of New York and Jack Nicholson – About Schmidt

- Best Actress:
  - Julianne Moore – Far from Heaven

Runners-Up: Maggie Gyllenhaal – Secretary and Isabelle Huppert – The Piano Teacher

- Best Canadian Film:
  - Atanarjuat: The Fast Runner

Runners-Up: Fubar and Soft Shell Man

- Best Director:
  - Paul Thomas Anderson – Punch-Drunk Love

Runners-Up: Alfonso Cuarón – Y Tu Mamá También and Todd Haynes – Far from Heaven

- Best Documentary Film:
  - Bowling for Columbine

Runners-Up: Gambling, Gods and LSD and Standing in the Shadows of Motown

- Best Film:
  - Adaptation.

Runners-Up: Punch-Drunk Love and Y Tu Mamá También

- Best First Feature:
  - Atanarjuat: The Fast Runner

Runners-Up: Confessions of a Dangerous Mind and Igby Goes Down

- Best Screenplay:
  - Adaptation. – Charlie and Donald Kaufman

Runners-Up: The Hours – David Hare and Punch-Drunk Love – Paul Thomas Anderson

- Best Supporting Actor:
  - Chris Cooper – Adaptation.

Runners-Up: Paul Newman – Road to Perdition and Dennis Quaid – Far from Heaven

- Best Supporting Actress:
  - Emily Watson – Punch-Drunk Love

Runners-Up: Kathy Bates – About Schmidt and Toni Collette – About a Boy

Special citation to Richard Kelly's Donnie Darko as the best film not to receive a proper theatrical release in Canada.

- Clyde Gilmour Award: Wayne Clarkson
