= Washington D.C. Area Film Critics Association Awards 2002 =

Annual US film awards ceremony

1st WAFCA Awards
- Date: December 30, 2002

Highlights
- Best Film: Road to Perdition
- Best Director: (3-way tie): Spike Jonze for Adaptation.; Sam Mendes for Road to Perdition; Denzel Washington for Antwone Fisher
- Best Actor: Jack Nicholson
- Best Actress: Julianne Moore

The 1st Washington D.C. Area Film Critics Association Awards, honoring the best in filmmaking in 2002, were given on December 30, 2002.

== Winners ==
Best Film

- Road to Perdition
  - Runners-up: Adaptation., About Schmidt, Antwone Fisher, The Lord of the Rings: The Two Towers

Best Director (TIE)

- Spike Jonze – Adaptation.
- Sam Mendes – Road to Perdition
- Denzel Washington – Antwone Fisher
  - Runners-up: Peter Jackson – The Lord of the Rings: The Two Towers and Rob Marshall – Chicago

Best Actor

- Jack Nicholson – About Schmidt
  - Runner-up: Daniel Day-Lewis – Gangs of New York

Best Actress

- Julianne Moore – Far from Heaven
  - Runner-up: Maggie Gyllenhaal – Secretary

Best Supporting Actor (TIE)

- Chris Cooper – Adaptation.
- Dennis Haysbert – Far from Heaven
  - Runner-up: Paul Newman – Road to Perdition

Best Supporting Actress

- Kathy Bates – About Schmidt
  - Runners-up: Michelle Pfeiffer – White Oleander and Renée Zellweger – White Oleander

Best Ensemble

- Barbershop
  - Runner-up: My Big Fat Greek Wedding

Best Original Screenplay

- Nia Vardalos – My Big Fat Greek Wedding
  - Runners-up: Alfonso Cuarón and Carlos Cuarón – Y Tu Mamá También, Brad Silberling – Moonlight Mile, and Chap Taylor and Michael Tolkin – Changing Lanes

Best Adapted Screenplay

- Charlie Kaufman – Adaptation.
  - Runner-up: Peter Hedges, Chris Weitz, and Paul Weitz – About a Boy

Best Animated Film

- Lilo & Stitch
  - Runner-up: Ice Age

Best Documentary Film

- The Kid Stays in the Picture
  - Runner-up: Standing in the Shadows of Motown

Biggest Disappointment

- Solaris

Best Guilty Pleasure

- Undercover Brother
  - Runners-up: Blue Crush and Die Another Day
