= 55th Writers Guild of America Awards =

55th WGA Awards
- Date: March 8, 2003
- Organized by: Writers Guild of America, East and the Writers Guild of America, West

The 55th Writers Guild of America Awards, given in 2003, honored the film and television best writers of 2002.

== Film ==
=== Best Original Screenplay ===
Bowling for Columbine - Michael Moore

- Antwone Fisher - Antwone Fisher
- Far from Heaven - Todd Haynes
- Gangs of New York - Jay Cocks, Kenneth Lonergan and Steven Zaillian
- My Big Fat Greek Wedding - Nia Vardalos

=== Best Adapted Screenplay ===
The Hours - David Hare

- About a Boy - Peter Hedges, Chris and Paul Weitz
- About Schmidt - Alexander Payne and Jim Taylor
- Adaptation. - Charlie and Donald Kaufman
- Chicago - Bill Condon

== Television ==
=== Best Episodic Comedy ===
Frasier - Bob Daily, Lori Kirkland and Dan O'Shannon for "Rooms With a View"

- The Bernie Mac Show - Larry Wilmore for "Pilot"
- Ed - Jon Beckerman and Rob Burnett for "The Wedding"
- Scrubs - Bill Lawrence for "My First Day (Pilot)"
- Sex and the City - Cindy Chupack for "Plus One Is the Loneliest Number"
- Sex and the City - Michael Patrick King for "I Heart NY"
- Sex and the City - Julie Rottenberg; Elisa Zuritsky for "Change of a Dress"

=== Best Episodic Drama ===
The Education of Max Bickford - Dawn Prestwich and Nicole Yorkin for "Pilot"

- ER - John Wells for "On the Beach"
- Resurrection Blvd. - Robert Eisele for "Nino Del Polvo"
- Six Feet Under - Christian Taylor for "In Place of Anger"
- The Sopranos - Mitchell Burgess and Robin Green for "Whoever Did This"
- The West Wing - Paul Redford and Aaron Sorkin for "Game On"
