= Roger Dodger (film) =

- Theatrical release poster
- Directed by: Dylan Kidd
- Written by: Dylan Kidd
- Produced by: Dylan Kidd; Anne Chaisson; Campbell Scott
- Starring: Campbell Scott; Jesse Eisenberg; Isabella Rossellini; Elizabeth Berkley; Jennifer Beals
- Cinematography: Joaquin Baca-Asay
- Edited by: Andy Keir
- Music by: Craig Wedren
- Production company: Holedigger Films
- Distributed by: Artisan Entertainment
- Release dates: May 9, 2002 (Tribeca); October 25, 2002 (United States)
- Running time: 106 minutes
- Country: United States
- Language: English
- Box office: $1.9 million

Roger Dodger is a 2002 American comedy-drama film written and directed by Dylan Kidd. It stars Campbell Scott, Jesse Eisenberg (in his feature film debut), Isabella Rossellini, Elizabeth Berkley and Jennifer Beals. The film follows Roger Swanson (Scott), a womanizing ad executive, who takes his nephew Nick (Eisenberg) out for a night in the city after the young man asks him for advice on seducing women.

The film debuted at the inaugural Tribeca Festival to critical acclaim and won the award for Best Narrative Feature for Kidd. It went on to win the FIPRESCI Prize and the Lion of the Future for Best Debut Film at the Venice Film Festival. Roger Dodger was given a limited release by Artisan Entertainment on October 25, 2002. Both Scott and Eisenberg received awards notices, with Scott winning a National Board of Review Award for Best Male Lead and Eisenberg earning a Gotham Award nomination for Breakthrough Actor.

== Plot ==
Cynical New York City advertising copywriter Roger Swanson, a self-styled lothario, is dumped by his on-again/off-again girlfriend, Joyce, who is also his boss. His workday is further complicated by the unexpected arrival of his sixteen-year-old nephew, Nick, who came to New York City to do a college admissions interview at Columbia University. After asking to spend the night at Roger's, Nick reveals that he has come to ask for help in the hope of ending his status as a virgin. That evening, an embittered Roger takes Nick to an upscale singles bar and gives him guidance in pickup artistry. They meet two women, Andrea and Sophie, and have a lengthy conversation.

All four leave the bar to go to an outdoor area, where they discuss their first experiences with sex. Upon learning that Nick is a virgin who has never been kissed, Sophie kisses Nick. Although Andrea and Sophie are impressed by Nick's good manners and lack of guile, they are annoyed by Roger's womanizing, and decide to go home. Nick runs after them and asks to spend more time with them, but they gently decline and depart in a taxi.

Nick chooses to continue the quest. They go to a party at Joyce's apartment, which Roger has not been invited to. There they find Joyce's secretary drunk, and Roger encourages Nick to take advantage of her vulnerable state. Once in the bedroom, Nick has reservations and allows her to fall asleep untouched. Meanwhile, Roger mocks Joyce's new lover in front of the other guests; Joyce fires him and asks him to leave the party. Nick follows Roger to the exit.

With Nick's window of opportunity closing rapidly, they agree to go with a "Fail Safe" plan, which turns out to be an underground brothel. After arriving at the brothel and paying a sex worker, Roger suddenly has doubts about letting Nick have sex with her, and drags Nick back to his apartment. The following day, Roger hears his sister's message from his answering machine saying that no one has seen her son Nick for two days, so Roger tells Nick to call his mother. Nick travels back to Ohio.

Some time later, Roger shows up to Nick's high school cafeteria to teach Nick and his friends about seduction.

== Cast ==
- Jennifer Beals as Sophie
- Elizabeth Berkley as Andrea
- Jesse Eisenberg as Nick
- Isabella Rossellini as Joyce
- Campbell Scott as Roger Swanson
- Mina Badie as Donna
- Ben Shenkman as Donovan
- Chris Stack as Chris

== Production ==
Dylan Kidd said his idea for the film "started with the idea of a guy who feels like he can tell everyone else what they're thinking. It was based on a friend of mine, who in college had this strange ability to go up to strangers and take their psychology apart in minute detail. It struck me as disturbing but also very compelling." Kidd decided to make the lead character work in advertising because Roger "actually ends up bringing that kind of rhetoric into the singles arena. The idea that he's literally trying to sell himself as a product, by creating insecurity in other people."

Campbell Scott was cast when the director happened to bump into him at a New York café. Jesse Eisenberg won the role of Nick when he was still a senior in high school.

The film was shot on 35mm.

== Reception ==
=== Release ===
The film had its world premiere at the first annual Tribeca Festival on May 9, 2002. It also opened the San Diego Film Festival on September 18, 2002. Artisan Entertainment acquired North American distribution rights to the film and gave it a limited theatrical release on October 25, 2002.

=== Critical reception ===
Rotten Tomatoes gives the film 88% based on 123 reviews. The site's consensus states: "The movie could have benefited from a more experienced director, but a great cast and script overcome any first time jitters the director may have had." On Metacritic, the film has an average score of 75 out of 100, based on 33 reviews.

The film was seen as a breakthrough for Jesse Eisenberg, who was widely acclaimed for his role. Stephen Holden of The New York Times called Roger Dodger a "promising first feature" from writer-director Dylan Kidd. He praised the performances of Scott and Eisenberg, the latter of whom he wrote, "The young actor's portrayal of an innocent but adventurous high school student finds a lovely balance between crude adolescent avidity and an inner sweetness that contradicts everything Roger stands for. It is this sweetness that wins over the women they meet and earns Nick his first serious kiss." Holden concluded "the movie, unlike its title character, treats women with respect."

Roger Ebert also gave the film a positive review, awarding it three out of four stars. However, he pointed out that the young age of Nick shows there is a double standard in films when it comes to the issue of consent and sex. He added the film "effectively deflects criticism in this area by making Roger the victim and the subject. While Nick is funny and earnest, and generates many laughs, the movie is really about Roger--about his attempts to tutor his nephew in a lifestyle that has left the older man lonely and single. The film is not just a lot of one-liners but has a buried agenda, as the funny early dialogue slides down into confusion and sadness. There is a lesson here for Nick, but not the one Roger is teaching."

== Accolades ==
Award	Category	Nominee	Result	Ref.
Chicago Film Critics Awards	Most Promising Filmmaker	Dylan Kidd	Won	
Gotham Independent Film Awards	Breakthrough Actor	Jesse Eisenberg	Nominated	
Gotham Independent Film Awards	Breakthrough Director Award	Dylan Kidd	Nominated	
Independent Spirit Awards	Best Screenplay	Dylan Kidd	Nominated	
Independent Spirit Awards	Best First Feature	Dylan Kidd	Nominated	
Independent Spirit Awards	Best Male Lead	Campbell Scott	Nominated	
National Board of Review Awards	Best Actor	Campbell Scott	Won	
New York Film Critics Circle Awards	Best First Film	Dylan Kidd	Won	
New York Film Critics Circle Awards	Best First Screenplay	Dylan Kidd	Nominated	
San Diego Film Festival	Best Director	Dylan Kidd	Won	
San Diego Film Festival	Most Promising New Actor	Jesse Eisenberg	Won	
San Francisco Film Critics Circle	Most Promising Debut	Dylan Kidd	Won	
Tribeca Film Festival	Best Narrative Feature	Dylan Kidd	Won	
Venice Film Festival	Don Quixote Award	Dylan Kidd	Won	
Venice Film Festival	Best Debut Film	Dylan Kidd	Won	
Venice Film Festival	FIRESCI Prize	Dylan Kidd	Won	
