= Far from Heaven =

2002 American-French film by Todd Haynes

- Theatrical release poster
- Directed by: Todd Haynes
- Written by: Todd Haynes
- Produced by: Jody Allen; Christine Vachon
- Starring: Julianne Moore; Dennis Quaid; Dennis Haysbert; Patricia Clarkson
- Cinematography: Edward Lachman
- Edited by: James Lyons
- Music by: Elmer Bernstein
- Production companies: Vulcan Productions; Killer Films; John Wells Productions; Section Eight
- Distributed by: Focus Features (U.S.); ARP Sélection (France)
- Release dates: September 2, 2002 (Venice); November 8, 2002 (U.S.)
- Running time: 107 minutes
- Countries: United States; France
- Language: English
- Budget: $13.5 million
- Box office: $29 million

Far from Heaven is a 2002 historical romantic drama film directed and written by Todd Haynes, starring Julianne Moore, Dennis Quaid, Dennis Haysbert and Patricia Clarkson. Moore plays a 1950s housewife living in wealthy suburban Connecticut as she sees her seemingly perfect life begin to fall apart.

Haynes intended the film as an homage to the melodramas of Douglas Sirk (especially 1955's All That Heaven Allows, 1956's Written on the Wind, and 1959's Imitation of Life), which explored issues of social entrapment and taboo relationships. Haynes extended those subjects to include interracial relationships, gender roles, sexual orientation, and class in the context of 1950s America.

The film premiered at the Venice Film Festival in September 2002, where Moore won the Volpi Cup for Best Actress, and cinematographer Edward Lachman won a prize for Outstanding Individual Contribution. Far from Heaven received numerous accolades, including four Academy Award nominations, including Best Actress for Moore and Best Original Screenplay. Moore was also nominated for a Golden Globe and Screen Actors Guild Award, while Quaid was nominated for Best Supporting Actor at the Golden Globes and Screen Actors Guild Awards.

== Plot ==
In 1957 suburban Connecticut, Cathy Whitaker seems to be the perfect wife, mother, and homemaker. Her husband, Frank, is an executive at Magnatech, a television advertising company. One evening, Cathy receives a phone call from the local police, who are holding Frank. When she picks him up, he says it is all a misunderstanding, but it turns out that he has been exploring the illicit underground world of gay bars of Hartford. One day, Cathy sees an unfamiliar Black man walking in their yard, who turns out to be Raymond Deagan, the son of their late gardener who is taking over his father's accounts.

When Frank says he is working late, Cathy brings him dinner at the office and walks in on him passionately kissing a man. He confesses to having had "problems" as a young man and agrees to sign up for conversion therapy. However, their relationship becomes strained, Frank's work suffers, and he increasingly turns to alcohol. Cathy runs into Raymond at a local art show, where they discuss a modern painting and art in general, to the consternation of onlookers. After a party, Frank and Cathy attempt to have sex, but he is unable to become aroused and accidentally strikes her when she tries to console him.

The next day, Raymond finds Cathy crying and invites her to run errands with him. Mona sees them arriving together at Eagan's, a Black restaurant where Raymond is known and Cathy is the only White patron, and begins spreading rumors. When Cathy attends her daughter's ballet performance, the mothers of the other girls shun her. After Frank hears about Cathy and Raymond, he confronts Cathy, who denies having a relationship with Raymond beyond the professional and says she has fired him to quell the rumors. She then tells Raymond that their friendship cannot continue, as it is not "plausible".

Cathy and Frank travel to Miami for New Year's to try to repair their marriage, but Frank meets a young man at the hotel, with whom he has a sexual encounter. While they are gone, three White boys taunt and physically assault Raymond's daughter, Sarah, partly because of her father's rumored relationship with Cathy, and the girl is concussed by a rock thrown at her head.

Frank breaks down and tearfully tells Cathy that he has fallen in love with someone who wants to be with him. She assumes that he wants a divorce and walks away. When Cathy learns what happened to Sarah, she visits Raymond, who says he is moving to Baltimore in two weeks, as the rumors have destroyed his business and led his African-American neighbors to throw rocks through his windows. When Cathy tells Raymond she is going to be single and asks if she can come visit him some time, he stoically, but gently, rejects her, saying he has learned his lesson and needs to do what is right for his daughter.

Cathy shows up at the train station to see Raymond off, and they silently wave to each other as the train leaves the station.

== Cast ==
- Julianne Moore as Cathleen "Cathy" Whitaker
- Dennis Quaid as Frank Whitaker
- Dennis Haysbert as Raymond Deagan
- Patricia Clarkson as Eleanor Fine
- Viola Davis as Sybil
- James Rebhorn as Dr. Bowman
- Celia Weston as Mona Lauder
- Michael Gaston as Stan Fine
- Ryan Ward as David Whitaker
- Lindsay Andretta as Janice Whitaker
- Jordan Puryear as Sarah Deagan
- Bette Henritze as Mrs. Leacock
- Barbara Garrick as Doreen
- Olivia Birkelund as Nancy
- June Squibb as elderly woman
- J.B. Adams as Morris Farnsworth

== Production ==
As recounted by the film's producer, Christine Vachon, in her 2006 autobiography, A Killer Life: How an Independent Film Producer Survives Deals and Disasters in Hollywood and Beyond, Haynes wrote the script for the film envisioning Moore and James Gandolfini as Cathy and Frank, respectively. While Moore joined the project immediately, Gandolfini was unavailable, due to his commitments to The Sopranos. Haynes' next choice, Russell Crowe, believed that the role was too small. The film's producers suggested Jeff Bridges for the role, but Bridges turned it down due to not meeting his financial demands.

== Themes and analysis ==
Far from Heaven focuses on several controversial issues of the mid-twentieth century, such as racism and miscegenation, as well as views on homosexuality and escapism during that time period, and presents these issues through the mise-en-scène and cinematographic conventions of a 1950s-style melodrama. Utilizing the nostalgic mechanisms of a polished, period melodrama, the film challenges the typical sanguine nature of the genre in an effort to highlight the central conflicts of its main characters, Cathy and Frank Whitaker, while also simultaneously shattering the wholesome image of American life during this time period, which is typically romanticized in American culture. Haynes employs these tactics and others, such as lighting and music, to highlight these pivotal developments and not only further the plot of the story, but create a sensory experience for the audience that lulls them into what appears to portray an idealized version of 1950s suburban American family life, but proves to be far from it.

Andrew O'Hehir of Salon wrote that the film "bears a family resemblance to Sirk's 1955 All That Heaven Allows".

=== Racism and miscegenation ===
Throughout Far from Heaven, one of the central conflicts faced by the main protagonist Cathy Whitaker comes from her attraction towards Raymond Deagan, the son of her recently deceased gardener, and how it develops in the face of her estrangement from her husband, Frank Whitaker, as he deals with his developing homosexual tendencies. Set in the fall of 1957 in Hartford, Connecticut, the racial tensions emblematic of the era are reflected right away in the first scene Raymond makes an appearance, tending to his father's former duties as the Whitaker's gardener. While Cathy is being interviewed for a society circular in her living room, she notices Raymond mulling around in her yard, and immediately becomes frightened, uneasy by the prospect of an unfamiliar black man. While her interviewer, Mrs. Leacock, suggests calling the police, Cathy walks outside to confront him and learns the circumstances of the situation and how he came to be there, after which she apologizes for her assumptions and demonstrates a capacity to see beyond his race and show sympathy for his father's recent passing. This is an action that is observed closely by Mrs. Leacock through the window, and ultimately makes its way into her article profiling Cathy and her "kindness to negroes".

Presenting this particular issue so early on in the film, there is a clear contrast drawn between Hartford's suburban idyllic autumnal setting and the reality of the social order that dominates the everyday life of the Whitakers and the people in their lives. As Frank's difficulties continue to develop, Cathy finds great solace in befriending Raymond and ultimately comes to develop feelings for him as a result. These feelings, however, prove to be a huge social taboo in this time period, and are met with anger and prejudice in affluent New England. With the developing historical events of the Little Rock Crisis serving as the contextual backdrop to the struggle in Far from Heaven, it is in this struggle that one of the central themes of the film comes to the forefront, and is continually reintroduced through segregational policies of the era. Over the course of the film, we observe Cathy and Raymond's interactions being highly scrutinized by the different members of their own respective communities, as well as examples of Jim Crow-like practices that were commonplace during this era, such as being unable to sit next to each other at a local lunch counter. Frank and Cathy's vacation to Miami exemplifies this when a young African-American boy jumps into the hotel pool where Cathy and Frank are vacationing. Not only is the boy swiftly removed from the pool, but the white guests who were swimming at the time rapidly exit the pool area in disgust, mortified that the water and surrounding area had been shared, and therefore tainted, by a black person.

Rebecca Sherr wrote in her essay "(Not) queering "white vision" in Far from Heaven and Transamerica":

Implicitly, this scenario illustrates white Americans' fear of black bodies, bodies that for whites symbolize "contamination"; and "contamination" in turn signifies the underlying fear of miscegenation. The camera moves between Cathy's point-of-view looking out at the pool, and then the camera turns and focuses directly on Cathy so that she becomes the object of the gaze. Her eyes remain half-hidden behind sunglasses, which act as shield and mirror. As the unfolding action is miniaturized and reflected—indeed, doubled—on Cathy’s lenses, the message is that this drama turns back on Cathy, illustrating in a rather didactic manner the futility of her desire for Raymond, a black man. The emphasis on parenting here, with a black father and white mother "saving" and disciplining their respective children, further emphasizes the undercurrent of segregation as policing the boundaries of racial reproduction.

=== Homosexuality and escapism ===
Frank Whitaker's hidden homosexuality sets in motion a series of events that ultimately lead to both his estrangement from his wife, Cathy, and the dissolution of their marriage. Publicly characterized as a successful Magnatech executive, reliable husband, and devoted father, Frank faces mounting professional and domestic expectations, including an increasingly demanding work load and tight deadlines from his New York office. Rather than returning home one evening, he visits a movie theater in Hartford and subsequently explores the city's nightlife, eventually followiung two men into an undergournd gay bar. This encounter marks the beginning of his secret relationships with men, through which the film depicts the covert nature of the gay community during the era.

Mitra Moin writes in her essay, "Far from Heaven and Carol: Channeling 1950s Melodrama":

The 1950s is a time of constraining expectations; everyone is expected to lead perfect suburban lives, and those that deviate are socially condemned. Haynes sets this up in Far from Heaven, where Cathy appears to have a model life: two children, a successful husband, and a suburban home. She is a typical housewife, admired by others: "Women just like yourself, with families and homes to keep up." This is dismantled in the premise, when Cathy receives a call from the police station regarding her husband. Beauty and perfection, here, are forms of oppression. The props are also important to observe as symbols of the 1950s: The television manifests the suburban prosperity that characterizes the time period. Cathy must adhere to the narrow and confining gender roles of the 1950s, just as Frank must suppress his homosexual desires. These characters, disillusioned in their seemingly flawless worlds, ultimately find these symbols as oppressive.

Likewise, Cathy, who finds an escape through her relationship with Raymond, begins to act on her impulses as well, taking us further into the bigoted, prejudiced nature of upper class Hartford society. When Cathy, in the aftermath of Eleanor observing the physical abuse Frank has inflicted upon her, is discovered crying in her yard by Raymond, their relationship becomes even closer, and he extends to her an invitation for a day in the country in an effort to take her mind off her worries, which she ultimately accepts. This invitation, however, sets in motion a series of events that culminates in a romantic evening between the two, which is inadvertently observed by Mona Lauder, a woman whose gossip is notorious for spreading like wildfire. It is through Mona's prejudiced tittle-tattle that Cathy soon finds herself with her reputation besmirched, as even her friends and loved ones are disgusted with her behavior. Frank's revelation of his affair to Cathy, which effectively ends their marriage, is mirrored when Cathy reveals her attraction for Raymond to Eleanor and is summarily rejected, exposing the subtle dichotomy between their respective vices. As Rebecca Sherr notes in her essay:

The "mirroring" technique occurs several times and is a visual clue as to the parallels the film draws between interracial romance and homosexuality. [...] The two instances of "coming out" in Far from Heaven produce different narrative trajectories, and the mediating factor of racial difference accounts for these divergent outcomes. This difference in outcome is based in the notion of visibility—racial difference cannot usually be hidden. The film communicates that heterosexual, interracial desire could, in a sense, be seen as even more "queer" than homosexuality, at least in the context of queerness as visible deviance.

Although Cathy finds herself isolated at the end of the film, a divorcée fallen from grace who now devotes her life to her children and her volunteer work for organizations such as the NAACP, she still possesses feelings for Raymond that, though now held back, dominate the subtext of the ending of the film, without either character having to utter a single word in their silent, tear-wrenching farewell. Todd McGowan observes of both Cathy and Frank in "Relocating Our Enjoyment of the 1950s: The Politics of Fantasy in Far from Heaven": "The point here is not that they enjoy in spite of the widespread disapproval; it is instead that this disapproval enables and fuels their enjoyment. Their time together has the significance it does precisely because the social prohibition does not permit it."

=== Mise-en-scène and cinematography ===
According to Haynes' director's commentary, recorded for the DVD-release of Far from Heaven, the film was made in the style of many 1950s films, notably those of Douglas Sirk. Haynes created color palettes for every scene in the film, and was careful and particular in his choices. He emphasized experience with color in such scenes as one in which Cathy, Eleanor, and their friends are all dressed in reds, oranges, yellows, browns, and greens, and also played with the color green by using it to light forbidden and mysterious scenes. This effect was employed both in the scene in which Frank visits a gay bar and when Cathy goes to the restaurant in a predominantly black neighborhood.

Blue is often used in the film to represent Frank and Cathy's failing marriage, as in the scene in which Cathy receives a phone call from the Hartford police concerning Frank and his "loitering" and, later, when Frank and Cathy leave the psychiatrist's office after their first visit to try to curb Frank's homosexual tendencies. It is in the second of these moments that the only profanity in the entire film is used, by Frank towards Cathy, further demonstrating the coldness and bitterness he feels towards his wife, and perfectly in sync with the color palette that envelops them during this scene.

Scott Higgins writes in "Orange and Blue, Desire and Loss: The Colour Score in Far from Heaven":

Generally, we can isolate two strategies of colour design in Far from Heaven. On one hand, Haynes makes straightforward and adroit use of classical convention in a fairly subtle and un-ironic way. On the other hand, moments of strong stylisation reveal a self-consciousness of form that announces its artifice. The film's articulation of an autumnal orange motif exemplifies how Haynes reawakens dormant Hollywood conventions in a rather delicate expressive manner. The more overt manipulation of coloured lighting, however, offers a test case. Red and green lighting broadcasts its artifice and its reference to Sirk, activating an awareness of form that Haynes nonetheless manages to align with our sympathy for his characters. In his extensive use of blue light, though, Haynes exploits conventional motivations and the melodrama's generic tendency towards stylisation to exact a sincere and direct affective charge from colour temperature, in much the way filmmakers had done between the late 1930s and 1960s. His project of self-conscious reference may, in fact, open room for Haynes to renew the classical convention in an emotionally direct way. It is this play between citation and invocation of colour scoring that makes Far from Heaven so compelling.

In addition to the color scheme, Haynes used shots and angles appropriate to Sirk's films and era, and the script employs over-the-top, melodramatic dialogue. In driving scenes, the filmmakers employed the rear projection process commonly used in older films, even reusing a plate from Sirk's Written on the Wind for one shot of Cathy driving to her daughter's ballet recital. Cinematographer Edward Lachman helped created the appropriate "look" by using the same types of lighting techniques, lighting equipment, and lens filters that would have been used to film a melodrama in the 1950s, and Elmer Bernstein's score is reminiscent of those he had composed 40 and 50 years earlier. Also, supervising sound editor Kelley Baker used Foley to make the sounds of things in the film such as rustling clothes and footsteps more prominent in a way similar to films from the 1950s.

In the director's commentary, Haynes noted that he was influenced by Rainer Werner Fassbinder's film Ali: Fear Eats the Soul. Both films portray feelings of alienation and awkwardness, which is conveyed by, for example, sometimes lingering on a character for a few seconds longer than is comfortable for the viewer before cutting to the next scene.

== Reception ==
=== Critical response ===
On Rotten Tomatoes the film holds an approval rating of 87% based on 221 reviews, with an average rating of 8.2/10. The site's critical consensus reads: "An exquisitely designed and performed melodrama, Far from Heaven earns its viewers' tears with sincerity and intelligence." On Metacritic, the film has a weighted average score of 84 out of 100 based on 37 critics, indicating "universal acclaim".

Jonathan Rosenbaum called the film a masterpiece and considered it a companion of Haynes' earlier film Safe (1995) in its use of "the same talented actress to explore suburban alienation in comparably gargantuan consumerist surroundings". Regarding the casting of Raymond, Peter Bradshaw of The Guardian wrote that "Haysbert brings a Poitier-esque dignity and poise."

In a mostly negative review, Stanley Kauffmann wrote in The New Republic that Julianne Moore “uses her gifts here to stay within the behavioral bounds of a Good Housekeeping mannequin":

At the last we are left wondering why, in any case, an imitation Sirk was needed ... Even with its latter-day (modified) frankness, Far from Heaven is only thin glamour that lacks a tacit wry base. Thus diminished, it can be tagged with a term that Susan Sontag once defined so well that she put it out of circulation: camp.

The film was nominated in four categories at the 75th Academy Awards: Best Actress in a Leading Role (Julianne Moore), Best Original Screenplay (Todd Haynes), Best Cinematography (Edward Lachman), and Best Original Score (Elmer Bernstein). At the Venice Film Festival, it was nominated for the Golden Lion, while Moore won the Volpi Cup for Best Actress and Lachman won a prize for Outstanding Individual Contribution.

In August 2016, BBC Magazine conducted a poll on the 21st century's 100 greatest films so far, with Far from Heaven ranking at number 86. In 2019, The Guardian ranked the film 13th in its list of the best films of the 21st century.

=== Awards and honors ===
The film did extraordinarily well in the Village Voice's Film Critics' Poll of 2002, where Far from Heaven won for Best Picture, Moore for Best Lead Performance and Haynes for Best Director and Best Original Screenplay. Lachman's work in Far from Heaven also won Best Cinematography by a wide margin, while Quaid, Clarkson, and Haysbert were all recognized for their supporting performances, placing second, fourth, and ninth, respectively.

Year	Ceremony	Category	Recipients	Result
2002	Academy Awards	Best Actress	Julianne Moore	Nominated
2002	Academy Awards	Best Original Screenplay	Todd Haynes	Nominated
2002	Academy Awards	Best Cinematography	Edward Lachman	Nominated
2002	Academy Awards	Best Original Score	Elmer Bernstein	Nominated
2002	Golden Globe Awards	Best Actress - Drama	Julianne Moore	Nominated
2002	Golden Globe Awards	Best Supporting Actor	Dennis Quaid	Nominated
2002	Golden Globe Awards	Best Screenplay	Todd Haynes	Nominated
2002	Golden Globe Awards	Best Original Score	Elmer Bernstein	Nominated
2002	Screen Actors Guild Awards	Best Female Actor in a Leading Role	Julianne Moore	Nominated
2002	Screen Actors Guild Awards	Best Male Actor in a Supporting Role	Dennis Quaid	Nominated
2002	Independent Spirit Awards	Best Feature	Far from Heaven	Won
2002	Independent Spirit Awards	Best Director	Todd Haynes	Won
2002	Independent Spirit Awards	Best Female Lead	Julianne Moore	Won
2002	Independent Spirit Awards	Best Supporting Male	Dennis Quaid	Won
2002	Independent Spirit Awards	Best Cinematography	Edward Lachman	Won
2002	Critics' Choice Movie Awards	Best Actress	Julianne Moore	Won
2002	Satellite Awards	Best Film - Drama	Far from Heaven	Won
2002	Satellite Awards	Best Director	Todd Haynes	Won
2002	Satellite Awards	Best Actress - Drama	Julianne Moore	Nominated
2002	Satellite Awards	Best Supporting Actor - Drama	Dennis Haysbert	Won
2002	Satellite Awards	Best Supporting Actor - Drama	Dennis Quaid	Nominated
2002	Satellite Awards	Best Screenplay - Original	Todd Haynes	Nominated
2002	Satellite Awards	Best Cinematography	Edward Lachman	Nominated
2002	Los Angeles Film Critics Association Awards	Best Picture	Far from Heaven	Nominated
2002	Los Angeles Film Critics Association Awards	Best Director	Todd Haynes	Nominated
2002	Los Angeles Film Critics Association Awards	Best Actress	Julianne Moore	Won
2002	Los Angeles Film Critics Association Awards	Best Cinematography	Edward Lachman	Won
2002	Los Angeles Film Critics Association Awards	Best Music Score	Elmer Bernstein	Won
2002	Los Angeles Film Critics Association Awards	Best Production Design	Mark Friedberg	Nominated
2002	National Society of Film Critics Awards	Best Supporting Actress	Patricia Clarkson	Won
2002	National Society of Film Critics Awards	Best Cinematography	Edward Lachman	Won
2002	New York Film Critics Circle Awards	Best Film	Far from Heaven	Won
2002	New York Film Critics Circle Awards	Best Director	Todd Haynes	Won
2002	New York Film Critics Circle Awards	Best Actress	Julianne Moore	Nominated
2002	New York Film Critics Circle Awards	Best Supporting Actor	Dennis Quaid	Won
2002	New York Film Critics Circle Awards	Best Supporting Actress	Patricia Clarkson	Won
2002	New York Film Critics Circle Awards	Best Cinematography	Edward Lachman	Won
2002	Boston Society of Film Critics Awards 2002	Best Actress	Julianne Moore	Nominated
2002	Boston Society of Film Critics Awards 2002	Best Cinematography	Edward Lachman	Won
2002	Chicago Film Critics Association Awards 2002	Best Film	Far from Heaven	Won
2002	Chicago Film Critics Association Awards 2002	Best Director	Todd Haynes	Won
2002	Chicago Film Critics Association Awards 2002	Best Actress	Julianne Moore	Won
2002	Chicago Film Critics Association Awards 2002	Best Supporting Actor	Dennis Quaid	Won
2002	Chicago Film Critics Association Awards 2002	Best Cinematography	Edward Lachman	Won
2002	Chicago Film Critics Association Awards 2002	Best Original Score	Elmer Bernstein	Won
2002	Dallas–Fort Worth Film Critics Association Awards 2002	Best Actress	Julianne Moore	Won
2002	Dallas–Fort Worth Film Critics Association Awards 2002	Best Cinematography	Edward Lachman	Won
2002	Florida Film Critics Circle Awards 2002	Best Actress	Julianne Moore	Won
2002	Florida Film Critics Circle Awards 2002	Best Cinematography	Edward Lachman	Won
2002	Kansas City Film Critics Circle Awards 2002	Best Actress	Julianne Moore	Won
2002	National Board of Review Awards 2002	Best Actress	Julianne Moore	Won
2002	Online Film Critics Society Awards 2002	Best Picture	Far from Heaven	Nominated
2002	Online Film Critics Society Awards 2002	Best Director	Todd Haynes	Nominated
2002	Online Film Critics Society Awards 2002	Best Actress	Julianne Moore	Won
2002	Online Film Critics Society Awards 2002	Best Supporting Actor	Dennis Quaid	Won
2002	Online Film Critics Society Awards 2002	Best Original Screenplay	Todd Haynes	Won
2002	Online Film Critics Society Awards 2002	Best Cinematography	Edward Lachman	Won
2002	Online Film Critics Society Awards 2002	Best Original Score	Elmer Bernstein	Won
2002	Online Film Critics Society Awards 2002	Best Art Direction	Peter Rogness; Ellen Christiansen	Won
2002	Online Film Critics Society Awards 2002	Best Costume Design	Sandy Powell	Won
2002	Phoenix Film Critics Society Awards 2002	Best Film	Far from Heaven	Nominated
2002	Phoenix Film Critics Society Awards 2002	Best Director	Todd Haynes	Won
2002	Phoenix Film Critics Society Awards 2002	Best Actress	Julianne Moore	Won
2002	Phoenix Film Critics Society Awards 2002	Best Supporting Actor	Dennis Quaid	Nominated
2002	Phoenix Film Critics Society Awards 2002	Best Screenplay - Original	Todd Haynes	Won
2002	Phoenix Film Critics Society Awards 2002	Best Cinematography	Edward Lachman	Nominated
2002	Phoenix Film Critics Society Awards 2002	Best Original Score	Elmer Bernstein	Won
2002	Phoenix Film Critics Society Awards 2002	Best Production Design	Peter Rogness; Ellen Christiansen	Nominated
2002	Phoenix Film Critics Society Awards 2002	Best Costume Design	Sandy Powell	Nominated
2002	San Diego Film Critics Society Awards 2002	Best Film	Far from Heaven	Won
2002	San Diego Film Critics Society Awards 2002	Best Actress	Julianne Moore	Won
2002	San Francisco Film Critics Circle Awards 2002	Best Director	Todd Haynes	Won
2002	Southeastern Film Critics Association Awards 2002	Best Actress	Julianne Moore	Won
2002	Southeastern Film Critics Association Awards 2002	Best Screenplay - Original	Todd Haynes	Won
2002	Toronto Film Critics Association Awards 2002	Best Director	Todd Haynes	Nominated
2002	Toronto Film Critics Association Awards 2002	Best Actress	Julianne Moore	Won
2002	Toronto Film Critics Association Awards 2002	Best Supporting Actor	Dennis Quaid	Nominated
2002	Vancouver Film Critics Circle Awards 2002	Best Actress	Julianne Moore	Won
2002	59th Venice International Film Festival	Golden Lion	Todd Haynes	Nominated
2002	59th Venice International Film Festival	Volpi Cup for Best Actress	Julianne Moore	Won
2002	59th Venice International Film Festival	Outstanding Individual Contribution (cinematography)	Edward Lachman	Won
2002	Washington D.C. Area Film Critics Association Awards	Best Actress	Julianne Moore	Won
2002	Washington D.C. Area Film Critics Association Awards	Best Supporting Actor	Dennis Haysbert	Won
2002	Writers Guild of America Awards 2002	Best Original Screenplay	Todd Haynes	Nominated

The film is recognized by the American Film Institute in these lists:

- 2005: AFI's 100 Years of Film Scores – Nominated

== In other media ==
Theatrical songwriting team Scott Frankel and Michael Korie worked with Richard Greenberg on an Off Broadway-bound musical adaptation. The musical opened at Playwrights Horizons in Spring of 2013. Kelli O'Hara starred in the central role.

== Soundtrack ==
Far from Heaven was the last film scored by Elmer Bernstein. The soundtrack album's runtime is 46 minutes and 9 seconds.

1. "Autumn in Connecticut" – 3:08
2. "Mother Love" – 0:42
3. "Evening Rest" – 1:52
4. "Walking Through Town" – 1:49
5. "Proof" – 1:01
6. "The F Word" – 1:11
7. "Party" – 0:55
8. "Hit" – 2:42
9. "Crying" – 1:11
10. "Turning Point" – 4:46
11. "Cathy and Raymond Dance" – 2:02
12. "Disapproval" – 1:00
13. "Walk Away" – 2:34
14. "Orlando" – 0:56
15. "Back to Basics" – 1:47
16. "Stones" – 1:44
17. "Revelation and Decision" – 4:21
18. "Remembrance" – 1:56
19. "More Pain" – 4:04
20. "Transition" – 0:55
21. "Beginnings" – 2:17

== See also ==
- New Queer Cinema
- Douglas Sirk
