= Unfaithful (2002 film) =

2002 American erotic thriller film directed by Adrian Lyne

- Theatrical release poster
- Directed by: Adrian Lyne
- Screenplay by: Alvin Sargent; William Broyles Jr.
- Based on: The Unfaithful Wife by: Claude Chabrol; Sauro Scavolini
- Produced by: Adrian Lyne; G. Mac Brown
- Starring: Richard Gere; Diane Lane; Olivier Martinez; Erik Per Sullivan
- Cinematography: Peter Biziou
- Edited by: Anne V. Coates
- Music by: Jan A. P. Kaczmarek
- Production companies: Fox 2000 Pictures; Regency Enterprises
- Distributed by: 20th Century Fox
- Release dates: May 10, 2002 (United States); July 8, 2002 (Karlovy Vary)
- Running time: 123 minutes
- Country: United States
- Language: English
- Budget: $50 million
- Box office: $119.1 million

Unfaithful is a 2002 American erotic thriller film produced and directed by Adrian Lyne and written by Alvin Sargent and William Broyles Jr., adapted from the Claude Chabrol film The Unfaithful Wife (1969). Starring Richard Gere, Diane Lane, Olivier Martinez and Erik Per Sullivan, the film follows Connie (Lane) and Edward Sumner (Gere), a couple living in the suburbs of New York City whose marriage is jeopardized when the wife embarks on an affair with Paul Martel (Martinez), a stranger she encounters by chance.

Unfaithful was theatrically released by 20th Century Fox in the United States on May 10, 2002, and was screened at the 37th Karlovy Vary International Film Festival on July 8, 2002. The film was a box office success, grossing $119.1 million against its $50 million production budget. Despite mixed reviews from critics, Lane received critical acclaim for her performance. Lane won the Satellite Award for Best Actress – Motion Picture Drama at the 7th Satellite Awards, and was nominated for the Academy Award for Best Actress at the 75th Academy Awards, the Golden Globe Award for Best Actress in a Motion Picture – Drama at the 60th Golden Globe Awards, the Screen Actors Guild Award for Outstanding Performance by a Female Actor in a Leading Role at the 9th Screen Actors Guild Awards and the Critics' Choice Movie Award for Best Actress at the 8th Critics' Choice Awards. The film was Adrian Lyne’s final directorial effort for 20 years until Deep Water (2022).

== Plot ==
Constance "Connie" and Edward Sumner have a generally happy but sexless marriage together and live in upscale Westchester County, New York with their eight year old son, Charlie. While shopping in SoHo, the wind knocks Connie into a young, handsome Frenchman named Paul Martel and they fall over. Paul then invites Connie into his apartment, where he cleans and ices her knee and then places his hand on hers. Paul insists that Connie takes a book before she leaves, addressing a passage about seizing the moment. When Connie returns home and opens the book, she discovers Paul's phone number inside of it.

Connie later calls Paul and he invites her back to his home; they flirt again and on her third visit, they dance and have sex. Soon, Connie keeps on making excuses to continue seeing Paul and Edward becomes suspicious when he notices her satin lingerie and catches her in a lie. Later on, Edward fires employee Bill Stone for perceived disloyalty and Bill, who witnessed Connie and Paul kissing in a diner, tells him to look at his own family. This inspires Edward to hire private investigator Frank Wilson to spy on Connie and he's devastated to see photos confirming her adultery.

One day, Connie almost forgets to collect Charlie from school, realizes her wrongdoing and attempts to call Paul to end their affair. With the phone call being unanswered, she tries leaving him a voicemail but is interrupted by Charlie. She then drives to Paul's home to end their affair in person but instead spots him with another woman. After attacking Paul in a library, she angrily confronts and questions him about how many other women he's seeing. Paul claims the other woman is just a friend and nothing more, but Connie is unconvinced and tells him that their affair is officially over. She then storms out of Paul's apartment but he catches up to her and forces himself upon her. Eventually, Connie succumbs to Paul and they have makeup sex in the hallway.

Afterwards, Edward arrives, narrowly missing Connie. Paul lets Edward into his apartment and while the pair discuss about Connie, Edward notices Paul's messy bedsheets and a snow globe that he gifted her on his shelf. Overcome with rage, he brutally hits Paul twice over his head with it, fracturing his skull and killing him. While cleaning up the evidence, Edward overhears Connie's tearful voicemail ending her affair with Paul, erases it and puts the latter's body in the trunk of his car before dumping it in a landfill. The next day, New York Police Department detectives find Connie's number in Paul's home and visit the Sumners after his estranged wife has reported him missing. Connie is surprised to learn that Paul was married but falsely claims that she barely knew him. The NYPD return when his body is found and question Connie again and after they leave, she breaks down crying.

At the dry cleaner, Connie discovers the photos of her and Paul in Edward's laundry and at a party that night, she discovers her snow globe back in their collection. When she confronts Edward, he responds by telling her that he knew about her infidelity from day one and then breaks down while telling her how hard he worked to give her and Charlie a better life, accuses her of being ungrateful and throwing away a hardworking husband and a happy family for an affair, before telling her that he hates her and that he wanted to kill her instead of Paul.

Days later, Connie discovers a hidden compartment in the snow globe, where years prior, Edward placed a photograph of them and an infant Charlie, with a message reading: ″To My Beautiful Wife, The Best Part Of Every Day!″. Realizing how much her husband loved her, she burns the incriminating photos of her and Paul. Edward says that he will turn himself in but Connie objects and they return to a normal life together. Returning home one evening, Edward stops at a red traffic light. Connie falls into an escape fantasy that they could leave the country to adopt new identities, as Edward agrees. While consoling her as she cries, it is shown that Edward has parked near a police station.

== Cast ==
- Richard Gere as Edward Sumner
- Diane Lane as Connie Sumner
- Olivier Martinez as Paul Martel
- Erik Per Sullivan as Charlie Sumner
- Željko Ivanek as Detective Dean
- Dominic Chianese as Frank Wilson
- Kate Burton as Tracy
- Chad Lowe as Bill Stone
- Gary Basaraba as Detective Mirojnick
- Erich Anderson as Bob Gaylord
- Myra Lucretia Taylor as Gloria
- Michelle Monaghan as Lindsay
- Margaret Colin as Sally
- Lisa Emery as Beth
- Michael Emerson as Josh
- Damon Gupton as Other Businessman
- Joseph Badalucco Jr. as Train Conductor

== Production ==
=== Development ===
According to actor Richard Gere, an early draft of the screenplay presented the Sumners as suffering from a dysfunctional sexual relationship, which gave Connie (Diane Lane) some justification for having an affair. According to Gere and director Adrian Lyne, the studio wanted to change the storyline so that the Sumners had a bad marriage with no sex, to create greater sympathy for Connie. Both men opposed the change; Lyne in particular felt that the studio's suggestions would have robbed the film of any drama: "I wanted two people who were perfectly happy. I loved the idea of the totally arbitrary nature of infidelity." The Sumners' relationship was rewritten as a good marriage, with her affair the result of a chance meeting.

=== Pre-production ===
During preproduction, the producers received a videotaped audition from Olivier Martinez, who was selected for Paul Martel. His character was portrayed as French once Martinez was cast. Lyne said, "I think it helps one understand how Connie might have leapt into this affair—he's very beguiling, doing even ordinary things." Once cast in the role, Martinez, with Lyne's approval, changed some of his dialogue and the scene in which he first seduces Lane's character Connie while she is looking at a book in Braille. According to Martinez, "The story that was invented before was much more sensual, erotic, and clear.

George Clooney turned down the role of Edward to star in Ocean's Eleven. Jennifer Lopez was offered the role of Connie but turned it down; she felt that the script "wasn't great". In a 2025 interview with Howard Stern, Lopez said she regretted that decision, admitting it still 'haunts' her. She explained that although the script wasn't good, Lyne's direction made it great. Lyne cast Diane Lane as Connie after seeing her in A Walk on the Moon. He felt that the actress "breathes a certain sexuality. But she's sympathetic, and I think so many sexy women tend to be tough and hard at the same time." Lyne also wanted Gere and Lane to gain weight to portray the comfort of a middle-aged couple. In particular, he wanted Gere to gain 30 pounds and left donuts in the actor's trailer every morning.

Lyne asked director of photography Peter Biziou, with whom he made 9½ Weeks, to shoot Unfaithful. After reading the script, Biziou felt that the story was appropriate for the classic 1.85:1 aspect ratio because it "so often has two characters working together in the frame". During preproduction, Biziou, Lyne and production designer Brian Morris used a collection of still photographs as style references. These included photos from fashion magazines and shots by prominent photographers.

=== Filming ===
Initially, the story was set against snowy exteriors but this idea was rejected early on. Principal photography began in New York City on March 22, 2001, and wrapped on June 1, 2001, with Lyne shooting in continuity whenever possible. During the windstorm sequence where Connie first meets Paul, it rained and Lyne used the overcast weather conditions for the street scenes. The director also preferred shooting practical interiors on location, so the actors could "feel an intimate sense of belonging", Biziou recalls. The cinematographer also used natural light as much as possible.

At times, Lyne's directing took its toll on the cast and crew. In a scene taking place in an office, the director pumped it full of smoke, an effect that "makes the colors less contrasty, more muted". According to Biziou, "The texture it gives helps differentiate and separate various density levels of darkness farther back in frame". The smoke was piped in for 18 to 20 hours a day and Gere remembers, "Our throats were being blown out. We had a special doctor who was there almost all the time who was shooting people up with antibiotics for bronchial infections". Lane acquired an oxygen bottle to survive the rigorous schedule.

The film has many explicit sex scenes, including a tryst in a restaurant bathroom and a passionate exchange in an apartment building hallway. Lyne's repeated takes for these scenes were demanding for the actors, especially for Lane, who had to be emotionally and physically fit for the scenes. To prepare for the initial love scene between Paul and Connie, Lyne had the actors watch clips from Fatal Attraction, Five Easy Pieces and Last Tango in Paris. Lane and Martinez would also talk over the scenes in his trailer beforehand. Once on the set, they felt uncomfortable until several takes in. She said, "My comfort level with it just had to catch up quickly if I wanted to be the actress to play it." Martinez was not comfortable with nudity. Lane said that Lyne would often shoot a whole magazine of film, "so one take was as long as five takes. By the end, you're physically and emotionally shattered."

Lane had not met Martinez before filming and they did not get to know each other well during the shoot, mirroring the relationship between their characters. A full four weeks of the schedule were dedicated to the scenes in Paul's loft, which was located on the third floor of a six-story building on Greene Street. Biziou often used two cameras for the film's intimate scenes to reduce the number of takes that had to be shot.

=== Post-production ===
Lyne shot five different endings to Unfaithful based on his experiences with Fatal Attraction, whose initial ending was rejected by the test audience. According to Lyne, he had some debate with 20th Century Fox executives, who wanted to "make the marriage gray, the sex bad. I fought that. I tried to explore the guilt, the jealousy—that's what I'm interested in." The studio did not like the film's "enigmatic" ending, which they felt failed to punish crimes committed by the characters. It imposed a "particularly jarring 'Hollywood' final line", which angered Gere. Fox preferred the ending where all the moral and narrative issues were tied up.

Following negative reactions from test audiences, the studio reinstated the original ending; a few weeks before the film was to open in theaters, Lyne asked Gere and Lane to return to Los Angeles for reshoots of the ending. Lyne claimed that the new ending was more ambiguous than the original and was the original one by screenwriter Alvin Sargent and close to the original film's. Lyne also thought the new ending "would be more interesting and provoke more discussion", saying he intentionally "wanted to do a more ambiguous ending, which treats the audience much more intelligently".

== Reception ==
=== Box office ===
Unfaithful was released in 2,617 theaters in the United States on May 10, 2002, grossing US$14 million on its first weekend, with an average of $5,374 per screen, ranking in second place behind Spider-Man. It made $52 million in the U.S. and Canada, and a total of $119 million worldwide, well above its $50 million budget.

=== Critical response ===
On Rotten Tomatoes, the film has a rating of 50% based on 165 reviews, with an average rating of 5.80/10. The consensus reads, "Diane Lane shines in the role, but the movie adds nothing new to the genre and the resolution is unsatisfying." On Metacritic, the film has a weighted average score of 63 out of 100, based on reviews from 34 critics, indicating "generally favorable reviews". Audiences surveyed by CinemaScore gave the film a grade "C+" on scale of A to F.

Paul Tatara of CNN wrote that he saw the film's audience "chuckling at all the wrong times, and that's a bad sign when they're supposed to be having a collective heart attack." Owen Gleiberman of Entertainment Weekly gave the film an "A−", praising Lane for "the most urgent performance of her career...a revelation. The play of lust, romance, degradation, and guilt on her face is the movie's real story." Roger Ebert of the Chicago Sun-Times wrote, "Instead of pumping up the plot with recycled manufactured thrills, it's content to contemplate two reasonably sane adults who get themselves into an almost insoluble dilemma." Kenneth Turan of the Los Angeles Times wrote that Lane was "inside her character...her initial half-distrustful tentativeness, her later sensual abandon or her never-ending ambivalence...living the role." Joe Morgenstern of The Wall Street Journal wrote that the film was "basically a chamber piece" with "no inclination to make a mockery of anyone." He liked how Lane played her character as "a mystery to herself, and disinclined to seek a solution." Jami Bernard of the New York Daily News thought the film was "deliberately unerotic" and "an honest movie about dishonesty", showing "how seemingly unexpected instincts lie dormant." He praised Lane's "intricate performance", and liked how the film did not "stoop to cheap psychoanalysis and must be commended for a bravely ambiguous ending."

Stephen Holden in The New York Times praised the "taut, economical screenplay" that "digs into its characters' marrow (and into the perfectly selected details of domestic life)." He liked how the film's "visual imagination hovers somewhere between soap opera and a portentous pop surrealism." Mike Clark of USA Today gave it 3½ out of four, writing that Lane "reaches a new career plateau with her best performance since 1979's A Little Romance." Stephen Hunter of The Washington Post wrote that the film left him feeling "dispirited and grumpy: All that money spent, all that talent wasted, all that time gone forever, and for what? It's an ill movie that bloweth no man to good." David Ansen of Newsweek wrote that the film "shows what a powerful, sexy, smart filmmaker Lyne can be. It's a shame he substitutes the mechanics of suspense for the real suspense of what goes on between a man and a woman, a husband and a wife." Andrew Sarris, of The New York Observer, wrote it was "escapism in its purest form, and I am willing to experience it on that level, even though with all the unalloyed joy on display, there's almost no humor," concluding it was "one of the very few mainstream movies currently directed exclusively to grown-ups".

=== Accolades ===
The studio campaign's theme consisted of what the studio called the film's "iconic scene": Connie recalling her first tryst with Paul as she takes a train home. According to Tom Rothman, chairman of Fox Filmed Entertainment, "That scene captured the power of her performance. It's what everyone talked about after they saw her." Four days before the New York Film Critics Circle's vote, Lane was given a career tribute by the Film Society of Lincoln Center. A day before that, Lyne held a dinner for the actress at the Four Seasons Hotel. Critics and award voters were invited to both. Lane won the Satellite Award for Best Actress – Motion Picture Drama at the 7th Satellite Awards, National Society of Film Critics Award for Best Actress at the 2002 National Society of Film Critics Awards and the New York Film Critics Circle Award for Best Actress at the 2002 New York Film Critics Circle Awards, and was nominated for the Academy Award for Best Actress at the 75th Academy Awards, the Golden Globe Award for Best Actress in a Motion Picture – Drama at the 60th Golden Globe Awards, the Screen Actors Guild Award for Outstanding Performance by a Female Actor in a Leading Role at the 9th Screen Actors Guild Awards and the Critics' Choice Movie Award for Best Actress at the 8th Critics' Choice Awards, losing the Academy Award to Nicole Kidman in The Hours. Entertainment Weekly ranked Unfaithful the 27th on their "50 Sexiest Movies Ever" list.
