= Dylan Kidd =

American director

- Born: August 30, 1969 (age 56); Chicago, U.S
- Occupation(s): Film director, producer, screenwriter
- Years active: 1990–present

Dylan Kidd (born August 30, 1969) is an American film director, producer and screenwriter best known for directing and writing the 2002 American film Roger Dodger.

== Career ==
Kidd achieved critical acclaim through his debut film Roger Dodger, starring Campbell Scott and Jesse Eisenberg in 2002. The movie won 12 awards, including Best Narrative Movie at the Tribeca Film Festival. His second movie P.S. was released in 2004 and was met with mixed reviews. In 2008 he directed the movie Peep Show and in 2011 directed two episodes of the U.S television series Childrens Hospital. Kidd went on to direct the 2016 film Get a Job, starring Miles Teller and Anna Kendrick. In 2017 he directed the movie Party Boat.

== Filmography ==
Year	Title
2002	Roger Dodger
2004	P.S.
2008	Peep Show
2016	Get a Job
2017	Party Boat
