= List of awards and nominations received by Julianne Moore =

Julianne Moore awards and nominations
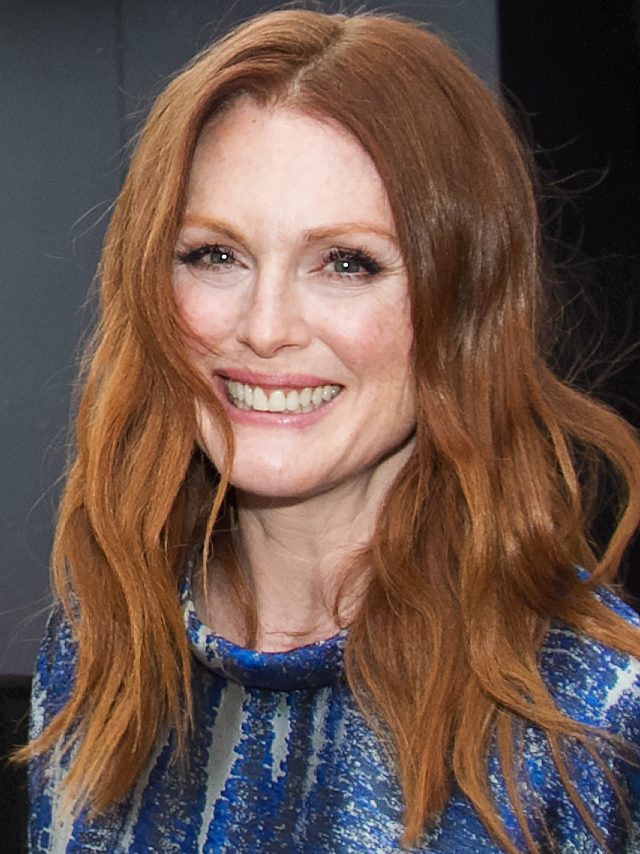
- Moore at the 2014 Toronto International Film Festival
Awards and nominations
Award	Wins	Nominations
Academy Awards	1	5
Actor Awards	2	11
BAFTA Awards	1	4
Critics' Choice Awards	2	6
Emmy Awards	2	2
Golden Globe Awards	2	10

Totals (Note: Certain award groups do not simply award one winner. They acknowledge several different recipients, have runners-up, and have third place. Since this is a specific recognition and is different from losing an award, runner-up mentions are considered wins in this award tally. For simplification and to avoid errors, each award in this list has been presumed to have had a prior nomination.)
- Wins: 122
- Nominations: 220

American actress Julianne Moore has received several awards, including the Academy Award, a British Academy Film Award, the Cannes Film Festival Award for Best Actress, a Daytime Emmy Award, a Primetime Emmy Award, two Golden Globe Awards, and two Actor Awards.

She won the Academy Award for Best Actress for her role as a woman succumbing to Alzheimer's disease in the drama Still Alice (2014). She was Oscar-nominated for playing an adult film star fighting for custody for her child in the drama Boogie Nights (1997), a romantic interest in the romantic drama The End of the Affair (1999), a suburban wife in the melodrama Far from Heaven (2002), and a pregnant Californian housewife in the psychological drama The Hours (2002). She is one of 12 actors in Academy Award history to receive two acting nominations in the same year.

On television, she won the Daytime Emmy Award for Outstanding Younger Actress in a Drama Series for playing the dual role of Frannie Hughes and Sabrina Hughes in the CBS soap opera As the World Turns (1988). She later won the Primetime Emmy Award for Outstanding Lead Actress in a Limited Series or Movie for portraying Sarah Palin in the HBO television film Game Change (2012). The role also earned her the Golden Globe Award for Best Actress – Miniseries or Television Film and the Actor Award for Outstanding Actress in a Miniseries or TV Movie.

Moore is one of only two actresses (the other being Juliette Binoche) to have won "Europe's Triple Crown" (winning at all three most prestigious film festivals: Berlin, Cannes, and Venice film festivals for the same categories) for the category of Best Actress. She won the Cannes Film Festival Award for Best Actress playing an aging film star in the satire Maps to the Stars (2014). She won the Berlin International Film Festival's Silver Bear for Best Actress for The Hours (2002) and the Venice International Film Festival's Volpi Cup for Best Actress for Far from Heaven (2002).

== Major associations ==
=== Academy Awards ===
Year	Category	Nominated work	Result	Ref.
1998	Best Supporting Actress	Boogie Nights	Nominated	
2000	Best Actress	The End of the Affair	Nominated	
2003	Best Actress	Far from Heaven	Nominated	
2003	Best Supporting Actress	The Hours	Nominated	
2015	Best Actress	Still Alice	Won	

=== Actor Awards ===
Year	Category	Nominated work	Result	Ref.
1998	Outstanding Female Actor in a Supporting Role	Boogie Nights	Nominated	
1998	Outstanding Cast in a Motion Picture	Boogie Nights	Nominated	
2000	Outstanding Female Actor in a Leading Role	The End of the Affair	Nominated	
2000	Outstanding Female Actor in a Supporting Role	Magnolia	Nominated	
2000	Outstanding Cast in a Motion Picture	Magnolia	Nominated	
2003	Outstanding Cast in a Motion Picture	The Hours	Nominated	
2003	Outstanding Female Actor in a Supporting Role	The Hours	Nominated	
2003	Outstanding Female Actor in a Leading Role	Far from Heaven	Nominated	
2011	Outstanding Cast in a Motion Picture	The Kids Are All Right	Nominated	
2013	Outstanding Female Actor in a Television Movie or Miniseries	Game Change	Won	
2015	Outstanding Female Actor in a Leading Role	Still Alice	Won	

=== BAFTA Awards ===
Year	Category	Nominated work	Result	Ref.
British Academy Film Awards
2000	Best Actress in a Leading Role	The End of the Affair	Nominated	
2003	Best Actress in a Supporting Role	The Hours	Nominated	
2011	Best Actress in a Leading Role	The Kids Are All Right	Nominated	
2015	Best Actress in a Leading Role	Still Alice	Won	

=== Critics' Choice Awards ===
Year	Category	Nominated work	Result	Ref.
Critics' Choice Movie Awards
2003	Best Actress	Far from Heaven	Won	
2003	Best Ensemble Cast	The Hours	Nominated	
2010	Best Supporting Actress	A Single Man	Nominated	
2011	Best Ensemble Cast	The Kids Are All Right	Nominated	
2015	Best Actress	Still Alice	Won	
2023	Best Supporting Actress	May December	Nominated	
Critics' Choice Television Awards
2012	Best Actress in a Miniseries or TV Movie	Game Change	Won	
2026	Best Supporting Actress in a Limited Series or Movie Made for Television	Sirens	Nominated	

=== Emmy Awards ===
Year	Category	Nominated work	Result	Ref.
Primetime Emmy Awards
2012	Outstanding Lead Actress in a Miniseries or Movie	Game Change	Won	
Daytime Emmy Awards
1988	Outstanding Ingenue in a Drama Series	As the World Turns	Won	

=== Golden Globe Awards ===
Year	Category	Nominated work	Result	Ref.
1994	Special Award for Ensemble Cast	Short Cuts	Recipient	
1998	Best Supporting Actress – Motion Picture	Boogie Nights	Nominated	
2000	Best Actress in a Motion Picture – Comedy or Musical	An Ideal Husband	Nominated	
2000	Best Actress in a Motion Picture – Drama	The End of the Affair	Nominated	
2003	Best Actress in a Motion Picture – Drama	Far from Heaven	Nominated	
2010	Best Supporting Actress – Motion Picture	A Single Man	Nominated	
2011	Best Actress in a Motion Picture – Comedy or Musical	The Kids Are All Right	Nominated	
2013	Best Actress – Miniseries or Television Film	Game Change	Won	
2015	Best Actress in a Motion Picture – Drama	Still Alice	Won	
2015	Best Actress in a Motion Picture – Comedy or Musical	Maps to the Stars	Nominated	
2024	Best Supporting Actress – Motion Picture	May December	Nominated	

=== Goya Awards ===
Year	Category	Nominated work	Result	Ref.
2025	Best Actress	The Room Next Door	Nominated	

== Festival awards ==
=== Berlin International Film Festival ===
Year	Category	Nominated work	Result	Ref.
2003	Silver Bear for Best Actress	The Hours	Won (Note: Shared with Nicole Kidman and Meryl Streep)	

=== Cannes Film Festival ===
Year	Category	Nominated work	Result	Ref.
2014	Best Actress	Maps to the Stars	Won	
2026		Women In Motion Award	Honoured	

=== Venice Film Festival ===
Year	Category	Nominated work	Result	Ref.
1993	Special Volpi Cup for Best Ensemble	Short Cuts	Recipient	
2002	Audience Award for Best Actress	Far from Heaven	Won	
2002	Volpi Cup for Best Actress	Far from Heaven	Won	
2017	Franca Sozzani Award	Suburbicon	Won	

== Other awards and nominations ==
Award	Year	Category	Nominated work	Result	Ref.
AACTA Awards	2015	Best International Lead Actress – Cinema	Still Alice	Won	
AACTA Awards	2024	Best International Supporting Actress – Cinema	May December	Nominated	
Alliance of Women Film Journalists	2011	Female Focus Award – Actress Defying Age and Ageism	The Kids Are All Right	Nominated	
Alliance of Women Film Journalists	2011	Special Mention Award – Bravest Performance	The Kids Are All Right	Nominated	
Alliance of Women Film Journalists	2011	Special Mention Award – Best Depiction of Nudity, Sexuality, or Seduction	The Kids Are All Right	Won	
Alliance of Women Film Journalists	2015	Best Actress	Still Alice	Won	
Alliance of Women Film Journalists	2015	Special Mention Award – Actress Defying Age and Ageism	Still Alice	Nominated	
Alliance of Women Film Journalists	2016	Most Egregious Age Difference Between the Leading Man and the Love Interest	Freeheld	Nominated (Note: Shared with Elliot Page)	
Alliance of Women Film Journalists	2024	Most Daring Performance	May December	Nominated	
Alliance of Women Film Journalists	2024	Grand Dame for Defying Ageism	May December	Nominated	
Austin Film Critics Association	2024	Best Supporting Actress	May December	Nominated	
Blockbuster Entertainment Awards	1998	Favorite Actress – Sci-Fi	The Lost World: Jurassic Park	Nominated	
Blockbuster Entertainment Awards	2000	Favorite Supporting Actress – Drama	Magnolia	Nominated	
Boston Society of Film Critics	1994	Best Actress	Vanya on 42nd Street	Won	
Boston Society of Film Critics	2002	Best Actress	Far from Heaven	Runner-up	
Boston Society of Film Critics	2010	Best Ensemble Cast	The Kids Are All Right	Runner-up	
Chicago Film Critics Association	1998	Best Supporting Actress	Boogie Nights	Nominated	
Chicago Film Critics Association	2000	Best Supporting Actress	An Ideal Husband	Nominated	
Chicago Film Critics Association	2000	Best Actress	The End of the Affair	Nominated	
Chicago Film Critics Association	2002	Best Actress	Far from Heaven	Won	
Chicago Film Critics Association	2003	Best Supporting Actress	The Hours	Nominated	
Chicago Film Critics Association	2009	Best Supporting Actress	A Single Man	Nominated	
Chicago Film Critics Association	2014	Best Actress	Still Alice	Won	
Chicago Film Critics Association	2023	Best Supporting Actress	May December	Nominated	
Dallas–Fort Worth Film Critics Association	2000	Best Supporting Actress	Cookie's Fortune	Won	
Dallas–Fort Worth Film Critics Association	2003	Best Actress	Far from Heaven	Won	
Dallas–Fort Worth Film Critics Association	2014	Best Actress	Still Alice	2nd Place	
Dallas–Fort Worth Film Critics Association	2023	Best Supporting Actress	May December	Nominated	
Denver Film Critics Society	2009	Best Supporting Actress	A Single Man	Nominated	
Detroit Film Critics Society	2014	Best Actress	Still Alice	Nominated	
Detroit Film Critics Society	2019	Best Actress	Gloria Bell	Nominated	
Dorian Awards	2013	Best Actress – Television Movie	Game Change	Nominated	
Dorian Awards	2015	Best Actress	Still Alice	Won	
Dublin Film Critics' Circle	2014	Best Actress	Maps to the Stars	4th place	
Dublin Film Critics' Circle	2015	Best Actress	Still Alice	Won	
Elle Women in Hollywood Awards	2002	Icon Award	—N/a	Won	
Empire Awards	2004	Best Actress	Far from Heaven	Nominated	
Fangoria Chainsaw Awards	2014	Best Supporting Actress	Carrie	3rd Place	
Florida Film Critics Circle	1997	Best Supporting Actress	Boogie Nights	Won	
Florida Film Critics Circle	1997	Best Ensemble Cast	Boogie Nights	Won	
Florida Film Critics Circle	1999	Best Ensemble Cast	Magnolia	Won	
Florida Film Critics Circle	2002	Best Actress	Far from Heaven	Won	
Florida Film Critics Circle	2014	Best Actress	Still Alice	2nd Place	
Florida Film Critics Circle	2023	Best Supporting Actress	May December	Nominated	
Georgia Film Critics Association	2015	Best Actress	Still Alice	Nominated	
Gotham Awards	2002	Actor Award	—N/a	Won	
Gotham Awards	2010	Best Ensemble Cast	The Kids Are All Right	Nominated	
Gotham Awards	2014	Best Actress	Still Alice	Won	
Gotham Awards	2026	Outstanding Lead Performance	The Debut	Pending	
Gracie Awards	2013	Best Actress in a Television Movie or Limited Series	Game Change	Won	
Hollywood Film Festival	2009	Best Supporting Actress	A Single Man	Won	
Hollywood Film Festival	2014	Best Actress	Still Alice	Won	
Hollywood Music in Media Awards	2026	Best Song – Onscreen Performance (Film)	"This City May Have Chewed Me Up (But It Hasn’t Spit Me Out)" (from The Debut)	Nominated	
Houston Film Critics Society	2010	Best Supporting Actress	The Kids Are All Right	Nominated	
Houston Film Critics Society	2015	Best Actress	Still Alice	Won	
Independent Spirit Awards	1993	Best Supporting Female	Short Cuts	Nominated	
Independent Spirit Awards	1995	Best Female Lead	Safe	Nominated	
Independent Spirit Awards	2002	Best Female Lead	Far from Heaven	Won	
Independent Spirit Awards	2014	Best Female Lead	Still Alice	Won	
Independent Spirit Awards	2024	Best Lead Performance in a New Scripted Series	Mary & George	Nominated	
Irish Film & Television Academy Awards	2015	Best International Actress	Still Alice	Won	
London Film Critics' Circle	2000	Actress of the Year	The End of the Affair	Nominated	
London Film Critics' Circle	2004	Actress of the Year	Far from Heaven	Won	
London Film Critics' Circle	2015	Actress of the Year	Still Alice	Won	
London Film Critics' Circle	2015	Actress of the Year	Maps to the Stars	Nominated	
London Film Critics' Circle	2023	Supporting Actress of the Year	May December	Nominated	
Los Angeles Film Critics Association	1997	Best Supporting Actress	Boogie Nights	Won	
Los Angeles Film Critics Association	2002	Best Actress	Far from Heaven / The Hours	Won	
Los Angeles Film Critics Association	2014	Best Actress	Still Alice	Runner-up	
Monte-Carlo Television Festival	2012	Best Actress in a TV Series or TV Movie	Game Change	Nominated	
MTV Movie Awards	2001	Best Kiss (shared with Anthony Hopkins)	Hannibal	Nominated	
National Board of Review	1999	Best Supporting Actress	An Ideal Husband / A Map of the World / Magnolia	Won	
National Board of Review	2002	Best Actress	Far from Heaven	Won	
National Board of Review	2014	Best Actress	Still Alice	Won	
National Society of Film Critics	1998	Best Supporting Actress	Boogie Nights	Won	
National Society of Film Critics	2000	Best Supporting Actress	An Ideal Husband / A Map of the World / Magnolia / Cookie's Fortune	Runner-up	
National Society of Film Critics	2015	Best Actress	Still Alice	Runner-up	
New York Film Critics Circle	1995	Best Actress	Safe	3rd Place	
New York Film Critics Circle	1999	Best Actress	The End of the Affair	Runner-up	
New York Film Critics Circle	2002	Best Actress	Far from Heaven	Runner-up	
New York Film Critics Online	2002	Best Actress	Far from Heaven	Won	
Online Film Critics Society	1997	Best Supporting Actress	The Myth of Fingerprints	Nominated	
Online Film Critics Society	1999	Best Supporting Actress	Magnolia	Nominated	
Online Film Critics Society	2002	Best Actress	Far from Heaven	Won	
Online Film Critics Society	2009	Best Supporting Actress	A Single Man	Nominated	
Online Film Critics Society	2014	Best Actress	Still Alice	Nominated	
Online Film Critics Society	2024	Best Supporting Actress	May December	Nominated	
Palm Springs International Film Festival	2015	Best Actress	Still Alice	Won	
People's Choice Awards	2004	Favorite Female Movie Star	—N/a	Nominated	
Rome Film Festival	2026	Lifetime Achievement Award	—N/a	Honored	
San Francisco Film Critics Circle	2014	Best Actress	Still Alice	Won	
San Diego Film Critics Awards	2002	Best Actress	Far from Heaven	Won	
San Diego Film Critics Awards	2023	Best Supporting Actress	May December	Nominated	
Sant Jordi Awards	2003	Best Actress (International)	Far from Heaven / The Hours	Won	
Satellite Awards	1998	Best Supporting Actress in a Motion Picture	Boogie Nights	Won	
Satellite Awards	1999	Best Supporting Actress in a Motion Picture	The Big Lebowski	Nominated	
Satellite Awards	2000	Best Actress in a Motion Picture	An Ideal Husband	Nominated	
Satellite Awards	2003	Best Supporting Actress in a Motion Picture	The Hours	Nominated	
Satellite Awards	2003	Best Actress in a Motion Picture	Far from Heaven	Nominated	
Satellite Awards	2005	Best Actress in a Motion Picture	The Prize Winner of Defiance, Ohio	Nominated	
Satellite Awards	2010	Best Actress in a Motion Picture	The Kids Are All Right	Nominated	
Satellite Awards	2012	Best Actress in a Miniseries or Movie Made for Television	Game Change	Won	
Satellite Awards	2014	Best Actress in a Motion Picture	Still Alice	Won	
Satellite Awards	2020	Best Actress – Motion Picture Musical or Comedy	Gloria Bell	Nominated	
Satellite Awards	2022	Best Actress in a Miniseries or Movie Made for Television	Lisey's Story	Nominated	
Satellite Awards	2024	Best Actress in a Supporting Role	May December	Nominated	
Saturn Awards	1993	Best Supporting Actress in a Film	The Hand That Rocks the Cradle	Nominated	
Saturn Awards	2002	Best Actress in a Film	Hannibal	Nominated	
Saturn Awards	2005	Best Actress in a Film	The Forgotten	Nominated	
Saturn Awards	2009	Best Actress in a Film	Blindness	Nominated	
Sitges Film Festival	2014	Best Actress	Maps to the Stars	Won	
Soap Opera Digest Awards	1989	Best Supporting Actress in a Daytime Series	As the World Turns	Nominated	
St. Louis Film Critics Association	2014	Best Actress	Still Alice	Nominated	
St. Louis Film Critics Association	2023	Best Supporting Actress	May December	Nominated	
Sundance Film Festival	2001	Piper-Heidsieck Award	—N/a	Won	
TV Land Awards	2006	Little Screen/Big Screen Star – Women	—N/a	Nominated	
Toronto Film Critics Association	2002	Best Actress	Far from Heaven	Won	
Toronto Film Critics Association	2014	Best Actress	Still Alice	Runner-up	
Vancouver Film Critics Circle	2003	Best Actress	Far from Heaven	Won	
Vancouver Film Critics Circle	2009	Best Actress – Canadian Film	Blindness	Nominated	
Village Voice Film Poll	2002	Best Actress	Far from Heaven	Won	
Village Voice Film Poll	2009	Best Supporting Actress	A Single Man	7th place	
Village Voice Film Poll	2010	Best Supporting Actress	The Kids are All Right	7th place	
Village Voice Film Poll	2014	Best Actress	Still Alice	5th place	
Washington D.C. Area Film Critics Association	2002	Best Actress	Far from Heaven	Won	
Washington D.C. Area Film Critics Association	2009	Best Supporting Actress	A Single Man	Nominated	
Washington D.C. Area Film Critics Association	2010	Best Ensemble Cast	The Kids Are All Right	Nominated	
Washington D.C. Area Film Critics Association	2014	Best Actress	Still Alice	Won	
Women Film Critics Circle	2014	Best Actress	Still Alice	Won	
Women Film Critics Circle	2014	Courage in Acting	Still Alice	Won	
Women Film Critics Circle	2015	Best Screen Couple (shared with Elliot Page)	Freeheld	Nominated	
Women Film Critics Circle	2015	Invisible Woman Award	Freeheld	Nominated	
Women Film Critics Circle	2015	Courage in Acting Award	Freeheld	Nominated	
Women Film Critics Circle	2023	Best Supporting Actress	May December	2nd Place	
Women Film Critics Circle	2025	Best Screen Couple	The Room Next Door	2nd place	
Zurich Film Festival	2026	Golden Icon Award	Outstanding character actresses of American cinema	Honoured	

== See also ==
- Julianne Moore filmography
