= Julianne Moore filmography =

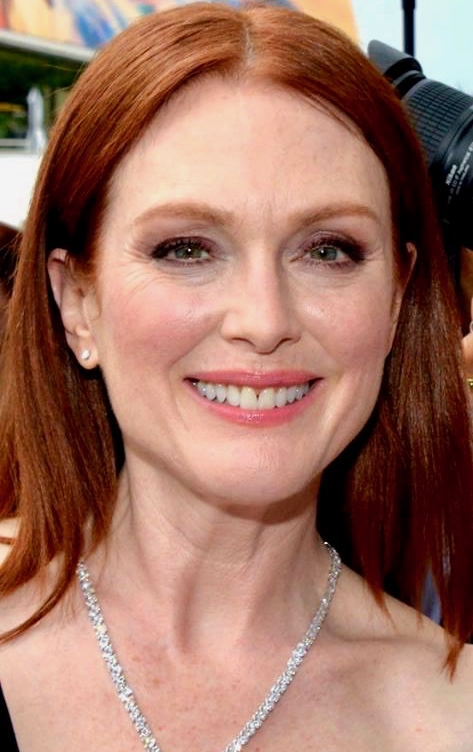
Moore at the 2018 Cannes Film Festival

Julianne Moore is an American actress who made her acting debut on television in 1984 in the mystery series The Edge of Night. The following year she made her first appearance in the soap opera As the World Turns, which earned her a Daytime Emmy Award for Outstanding Ingenue in a Drama Series in 1988. Following roles in television films, Moore had her breakthrough in Robert Altman's drama film Short Cuts (1993). Her performance garnered critical acclaim as well as notoriety for a monologue her character delivers while nude below the waist. She played lead roles in 1995 in Todd Haynes' drama Safe and the romantic comedy Nine Months. In 1997, Moore portrayed a veteran pornographic actress in Paul Thomas Anderson's drama film Boogie Nights, which earned her her first nomination for the Academy Award for Best Supporting Actress. She also appeared in Steven Spielberg's adventure sequel The Lost World: Jurassic Park—Moore's biggest commercial success to that point. Two years later, she played a wartime adulteress in The End of the Affair, for which she received her first Academy Award for Best Actress nomination.

In 2001, Moore portrayed the fictional character Clarice Starling in the crime thriller sequel Hannibal, and appeared as a scientist in the science fiction comedy Evolution. The following year, she re-teamed with Todd Haynes on the drama Far from Heaven and starred in the Stephen Daldry-directed drama The Hours, playing a troubled 1950s suburban housewife in both films. She was awarded the Volpi Cup for Best Actress for the former and the Silver Bear for Best Actress for the latter, and also received Academy Award nominations for both Best Actress (Far From Heaven) and Best Supporting Actress (The Hours). In 2006, Moore starred in the crime drama Freedomland and Alfonso Cuarón's science fiction thriller Children of Men. She went on to play the socialite Barbara Daly Baekeland in Savage Grace (2007) and appeared opposite Colin Firth in the drama A Single Man (2009).

Moore portrayed politician Sarah Palin in the 2012 political television drama Game Change, for which she won the Primetime Emmy Award for Outstanding Lead Actress in a Miniseries or a Movie. She found significant success in 2014 starring as an ageing actress in the satire Maps to the Stars, which won her the Cannes Film Festival Award for Best Actress, and as a linguistics professor with early-onset Alzheimer's disease in the drama Still Alice, for which she received the Best Actress Oscar. Moore also appeared in The Hunger Games: Mockingjay – Part 1, which earned over $755 million to emerge as her highest-grossing release. In 2017 Moore played a villainous entrepreneur in the highly successful spy film Kingsman: The Golden Circle.

== Film ==
Year	Title	Role	Notes	Ref.
1990	Tales from the Darkside: The Movie	Susan Smith		
1992	The Hand That Rocks the Cradle	Marlene Craven		
1992	The Gun in Betty Lou's Handbag	Elinor		
1993	Body of Evidence	Sharon Dulaney		
1993	Benny & Joon	Ruthie		
1993	The Fugitive	Dr. Anne Eastman		
1993	Short Cuts	Marian Wyman		
1994	Vanya on 42nd Street	Yelena		
1995	Safe	Carol White		
1995	Roommates	Beth Holzcek		
1995	Nine Months	Rebecca Taylor		
1995	Assassins	Anna / Electra		
1996	Surviving Picasso	Dora Maar		
1997	The Lost World: Jurassic Park	Dr. Sarah Harding		
1997	The Myth of Fingerprints	Mia		
1997	Boogie Nights	Maggie / Amber Waves		
1997	Chicago Cab	Distraught Woman		
1998	The Big Lebowski	Maude Lebowski		
1998	Psycho	Lila Crane		
1999	Cookie's Fortune	Cora Duvall		
1999	An Ideal Husband	Mrs. Laura Cheveley		
1999	A Map of the World	Theresa Collins		
1999	The End of the Affair	Sarah Miles		
1999	Magnolia	Linda Partridge		
2000	Not I	"Mouth"	Short film	
2000	Ladies Man	Audrey		
2001	Hannibal	FBI Agent Clarice Starling		
2001	Evolution	Dr. Allison Reed		
2001	World Traveler	Dulcie		
2001	The Shipping News	Wavey Prowse		
2002	Far from Heaven	Cathy Whitaker		
2002	The Hours	Laura Brown		
2004	Marie and Bruce	Marie	Also executive producer	
2004	Laws of Attraction	Audrey Woods		
2004	The Forgotten	Telly Paretta		
2005	Trust the Man	Rebecca		
2005	The Prize Winner of Defiance, Ohio	Evelyn Ryan		
2005	The Naked Brothers Band: The Movie	Herself	Cameo	
2006	Freedomland	Brenda Martin		
2006	Children of Men	Julian Taylor		
2007	Next	FBI Agent Callie Ferris		
2007	Savage Grace	Barbara Baekeland		
2007	I'm Not There	Alice Fabian		
2008	Eagle Eye	ARIIA (voice)	Uncredited	
2008	Blindness	Doctor's Wife		
2009	The Private Lives of Pippa Lee	Kat		
2009	A Single Man	Charlotte "Charley" Roberts		
2009	Chloe	Catherine Stewart		
2010	The Kids Are All Right	Jules Allgood		
2010	Shelter	Cara Harding	Also known as 6 Souls	
2011	Crazy, Stupid, Love	Emily Weaver		
2012	Being Flynn	Jody Flynn		
2012	What Maisie Knew	Susanna		
2013	Don Jon	Esther		
2013	The English Teacher	Linda Sinclair		
2013	Carrie	Margaret White		
2014	Non-Stop	Jen Summers		
2014	Maps to the Stars	Havana Segrand		
2014	Still Alice	Dr. Alice Howland		
2014	The Hunger Games: Mockingjay – Part 1	President Alma Coin		
2014	Seventh Son	Mother Malkin		
2015	Maggie's Plan	Georgette Nørgaard		
2015	Freeheld	Laurel Hester		
2015	The Hunger Games: Mockingjay – Part 2	President Alma Coin		
2017	Wonderstruck	Lillian Mayhew / Older Rose Mayhew		
2017	Suburbicon	Rose / Margaret		
2017	Kingsman: The Golden Circle	Poppy Adams		
2018	Gloria Bell	Gloria Bell	Also executive producer	
2018	Bel Canto	Roxanne Coss		
2019	After the Wedding	Theresa Young	Also producer	
2019	The Staggering Girl	Francesca Moretti	Short film	
2020	The Glorias	Gloria Steinem		
2021	The Woman in the Window	Katie / Jane Russell		
2021	Spirit Untamed	Cora Prescott (voice)		
2021	With/In: Volume 1	Unknown	Segment: "Intersection"	
2021	Dear Evan Hansen	Heidi Hansen		
2022	When You Finish Saving the World	Rachel Katz		
2023	Sharper	Madeline	Also producer	
2023	May December	Gracie Atherton-Yoo		
2024	The Room Next Door	Ingrid		
2025	Echo Valley	Kate Garrett		
2025	The New Yorker at 100	Narrator	Documentary film	
2026	Two People Exchanging Saliva	—	Short film; executive producer	
2026	The Debut	Mona Friedman		
TBA	Control †	TBA	Post-production	
TBA	Cry to Heaven †	TBA	Completed	
TBA	The Joy of Sex †	Jane Henderson	Filming	

Key
†	Denotes films that have not yet been released

== Television ==
Year(s)	Title	Role(s)	Notes	Ref.
1984	The Edge of Night	Carmen Engler	7 episodes	
1985–1988; 2010	As the World Turns	Frannie Hughes; Sabrina Hughes	Series regular Guest	
1987	I'll Take Manhattan	India West	Miniseries	
1989	Money, Power, Murder	Peggy Lynn Brady	Television film	
1990	B.L. Stryker	Tina	Episode: "High Rise"	
1991	The Last to Go	Marcy	Television film	
1991	Cast a Deadly Spell	Connie Stone	Television film	
1998	Saturday Night Live	Host	Episode: "Julianne Moore / Backstreet Boys"	
2004	Sesame Street	Herself	2 episodes	
2009–2013	30 Rock	Nancy Donovan	6 episodes	
2012	Game Change	Sarah Palin	Television film	
2016	Inside Amy Schumer	Herself	Episode: "Brave"	
2016	Difficult People	Sarah Nussbaum	Episode: "High Alert"	
2017	Nightcap	Herself	Episode: "Single White Staci"	
2021	Lisey's Story	Lisey Landon	Lead role; Miniseries	
2024	Mary & George	Mary Villiers	Lead role; Miniseries	
2025	Sirens	Michaela Kell	Lead role; Miniseries	
2026	The Simpsons	Consonance (voice)	Episode: "Seperance"	

== Theater ==
Year	Title	Role	Playwright	Venue	Ref.
1987	Serious Money	Mandy	Caryl Churchill	The Public Theater, Off-Broadway	
1988	Hamlet	Ophelia	William Shakespeare	Tyrone Guthrie Theater, Minneapolis	
1990	Uncle Vanya	Yelena	Anton Chekhov	Victory Theatre, Off-Broadway	
1990	Ice Cream with Hot Fudge	Sonia	Caryl Churchill	The Public Theater, Off-Broadway	
2006	The Vertical Hour	Nadia Blye	David Hare	Music Box Theater, Broadway	
2027	Faydra	Faydra	Sarah Ruhl	Manhattan Theater Club, Off-Broadway	

== Video games ==
Year	Title	Role	Notes	Ref.
1997	Chaos Island: The Lost World	Sarah Harding (voice)	Based on the movie The Lost World: Jurassic Park	

== Podcasts ==
Year	Title	Role	Notes	Ref.
2022	Case 63	Dr. Eliza Beatrix Knight (voice)	Lead role; based on the Chilean fiction podcast Caso 63	

== See also ==
- List of awards and nominations received by Julianne Moore
