= Chicago Film Critics Association Awards 2002 =

Awards ceremony

15th CFCA Awards

January 8, 2003

Best Film:
Far from Heaven

The 15th Chicago Film Critics Association Awards, given on 8 January 2003, honored the finest achievements in 2002 filmmaking.

== Winners ==
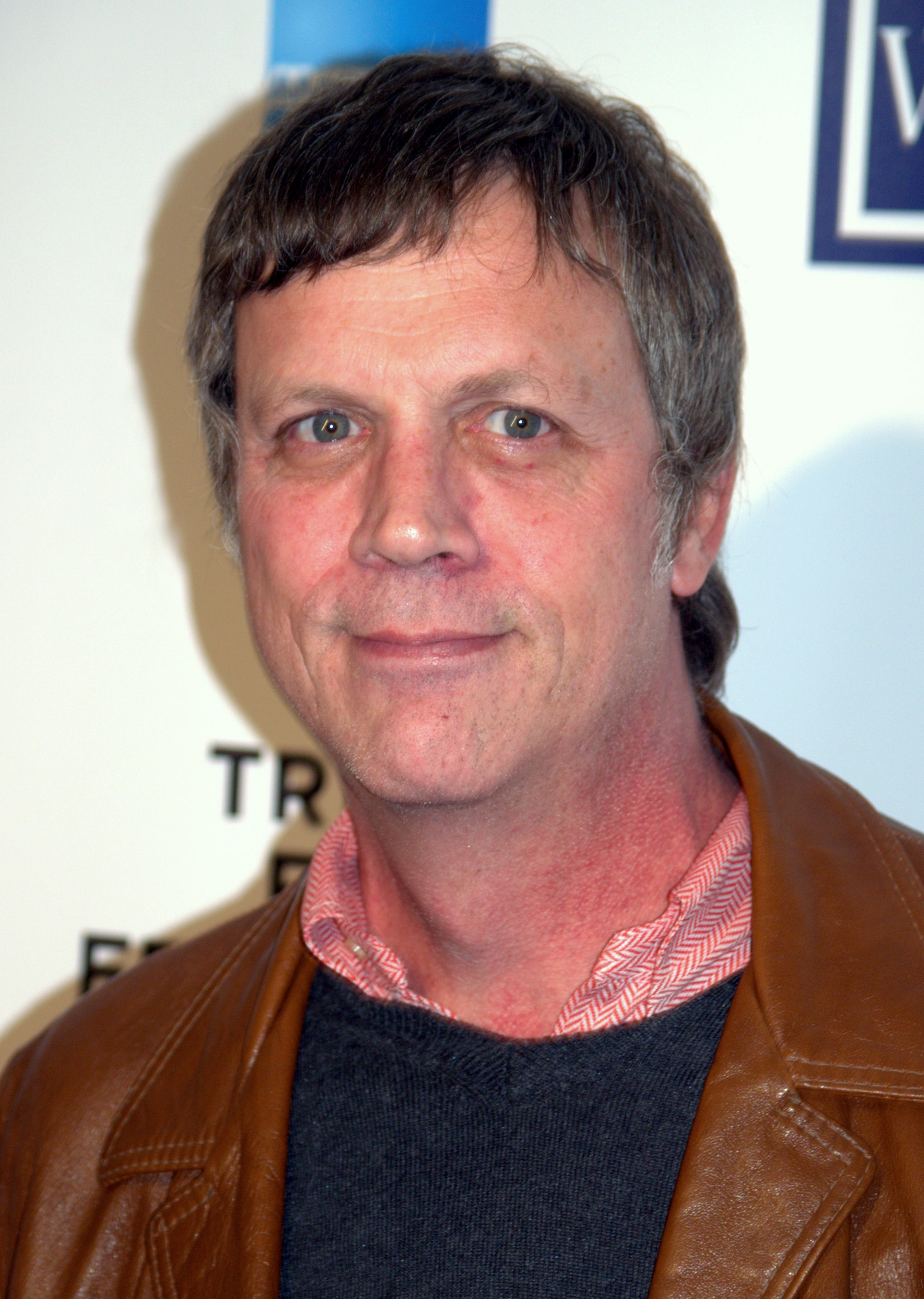
Todd Haynes, Best Director winner

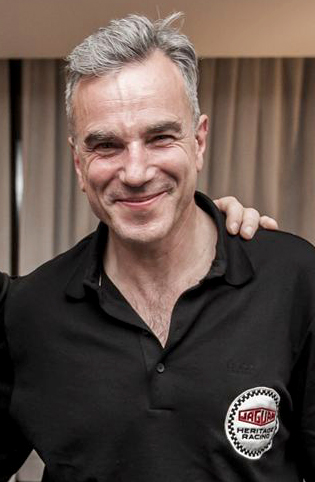
Daniel Day-Lewis, Best Actor winner

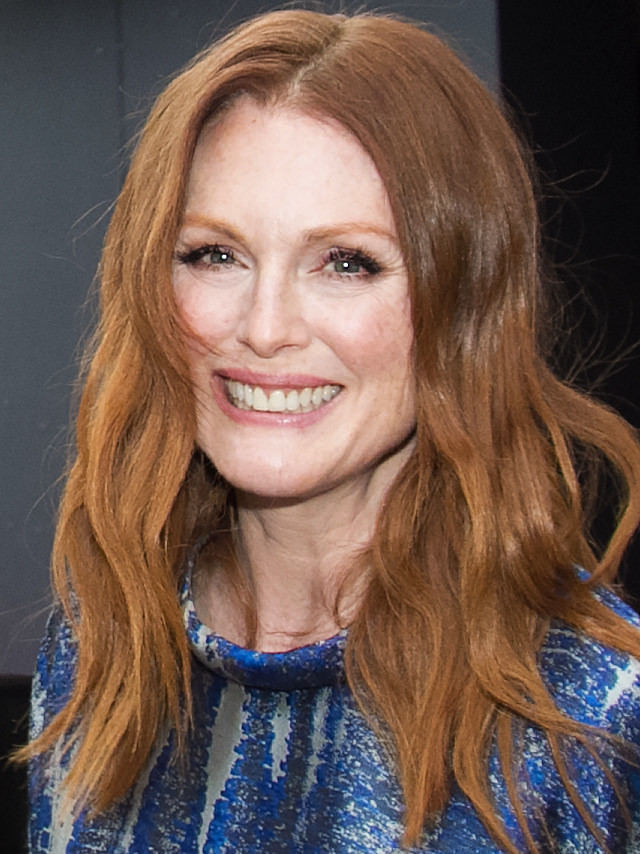
Julianne Moore, Best Actress winner

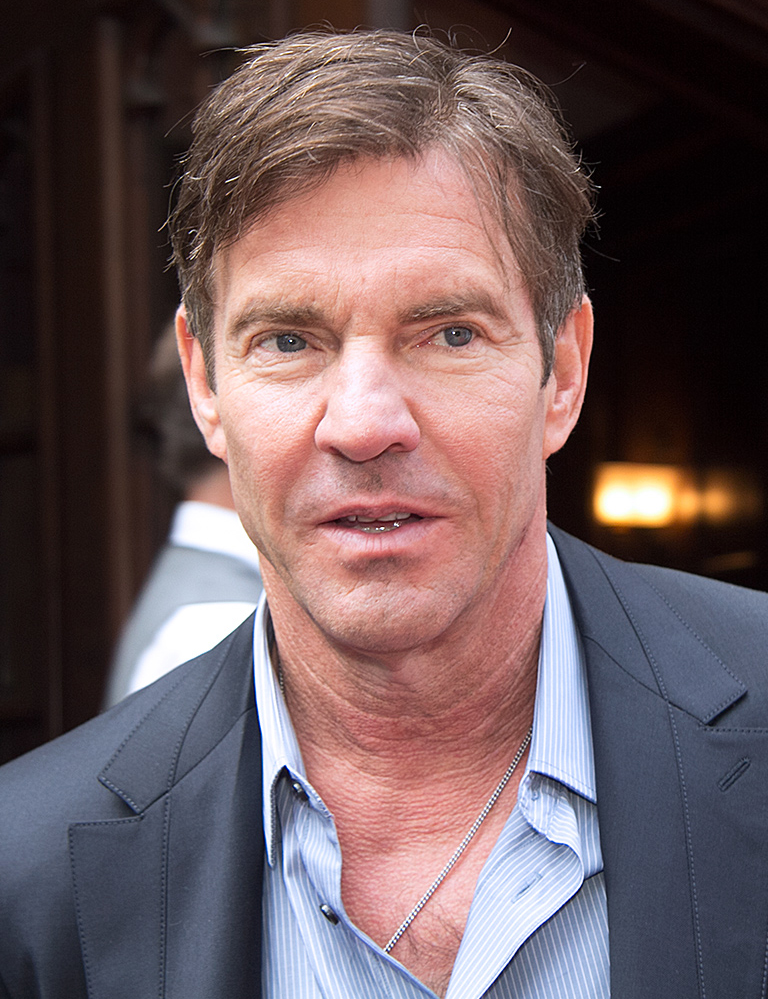
Dennis Quaid, Best Supporting Actor winner

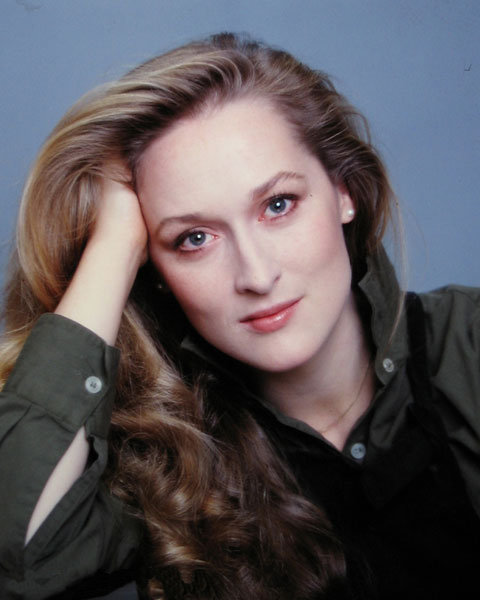
Meryl Streep, Best Supporting Actress winner

- Best Actor:
  - Daniel Day-Lewis – Gangs of New York
- Best Actress:
  - Julianne Moore – Far from Heaven
- Best Cinematography:
  - Far from Heaven
- Best Director:
  - Todd Haynes – Far from Heaven
- Best Documentary Feature:
  - Bowling for Columbine
- Best Film:
  - Far from Heaven
- Best Foreign Language Film:
  - Y Tu Mamá También (And Your Mother Too), Mexico/USA
- Best Score:
  - Far from Heaven
- Best Screenplay:
  - Adaptation. – Charlie and Donald Kaufman
- Best Supporting Actor:
  - Dennis Quaid – Far from Heaven
- Best Supporting Actress:
  - Meryl Streep – Adaptation.
- Most Promising Filmmaker:
  - Dylan Kidd – Roger Dodger
- Most Promising Performer:
  - Maggie Gyllenhaal – Secretary, Adaptation. and Confessions of a Dangerous Mind
