= Julianne Moore =

American actress (born 1960)

- Moore in 2026
- Born: Julie Anne Smith; December 3, 1960 (age 65); Fort Bragg, North Carolina, U.S.
- Education: Boston University (BFA)
- Occupations: Actress; children's author
- Years active: 1984–present
- Works: Full list
- Spouses: John Gould Rubin (m. 1986; div. 1995); Bart Freundlich (m. 2003)
- Children: 2
- Relatives: Peter Moore Smith (brother)
- Awards: Full list

Julie Anne Smith (born December 3, 1960), known professionally as Julianne Moore, is an American actress. Prolific in independent films and blockbusters since the early 1990s, she is particularly known for her portrayals of emotionally troubled and vulnerable women. She is the recipient of numerous accolades, including an Academy Award, a BAFTA Award, two Golden Globe Awards, and two Emmy Awards. Additionally, she is one of only two women (Note: Along with Juliette Binoche.) to have won an acting award at each of the world's three major film festivals (the Volpi Cup, the Silver Bear and the Cannes Film Festival Award).

After studying theater at Boston University, she had a regular role in the soap opera As the World Turns from 1985 to 1988, earning a Daytime Emmy Award. Moore made her breakthrough with Robert Altman's ensemble film Short Cuts (1993), followed by a critically acclaimed performance in Todd Haynes' Safe (1995). Starring roles in the blockbusters Nine Months (1995) and The Lost World: Jurassic Park (1997) established her as a Hollywood leading lady. She received Oscar nominations for her roles as a 1970s pornographic actress in the drama film Boogie Nights (1997) and emotionally unsatisfied housewives in the period dramas The End of the Affair (1999), Far from Heaven (2002), and The Hours (2002).

Moore's career progressed with roles in The Big Lebowski (1998), Magnolia (1999), Hannibal (2001), Children of Men (2006), A Single Man (2009), The Kids Are All Right (2010), Crazy, Stupid, Love (2011), and Maps to the Stars (2014). She won a Primetime Emmy for playing Sarah Palin in the HBO film Game Change (2012), and the Academy Award for Best Actress for her portrayal of an Alzheimer's patient in Still Alice (2014). Her highest-grossing releases came with the final two films in The Hunger Games film series (2014–2015) and the spy film Kingsman: The Golden Circle (2017). Since then she starred in independent films and streaming projects including Haynes' drama May December (2023), the historical drama miniseries Mary & George (2024), and the black comedy limited series Sirens (2025).

In addition to acting, Moore has written a series of children's books about a character named Freckleface Strawberry. She is married to director Bart Freundlich and they have two children. In 2015, Time named her to its 100 most influential people in the world list and in 2020, The New York Times named her one of the greatest actors of the 21st century.

== Early life and education ==
Julie Anne Smith was born on December 3, 1960, at Fort Bragg, North Carolina. Her father, Peter Moore Smith, a paratrooper in the U.S. Army during the Vietnam War, attained the rank of colonel and became a military judge. Her mother, Anne (née Love 1940–2009), was a psychologist and social worker from Greenock, Scotland, who had migrated with her family to the United States in 1951. Moore has a younger sister and a younger brother, the novelist Peter Moore Smith. Having a Scottish mother, Moore claimed British citizenship in 2011 in her honor.

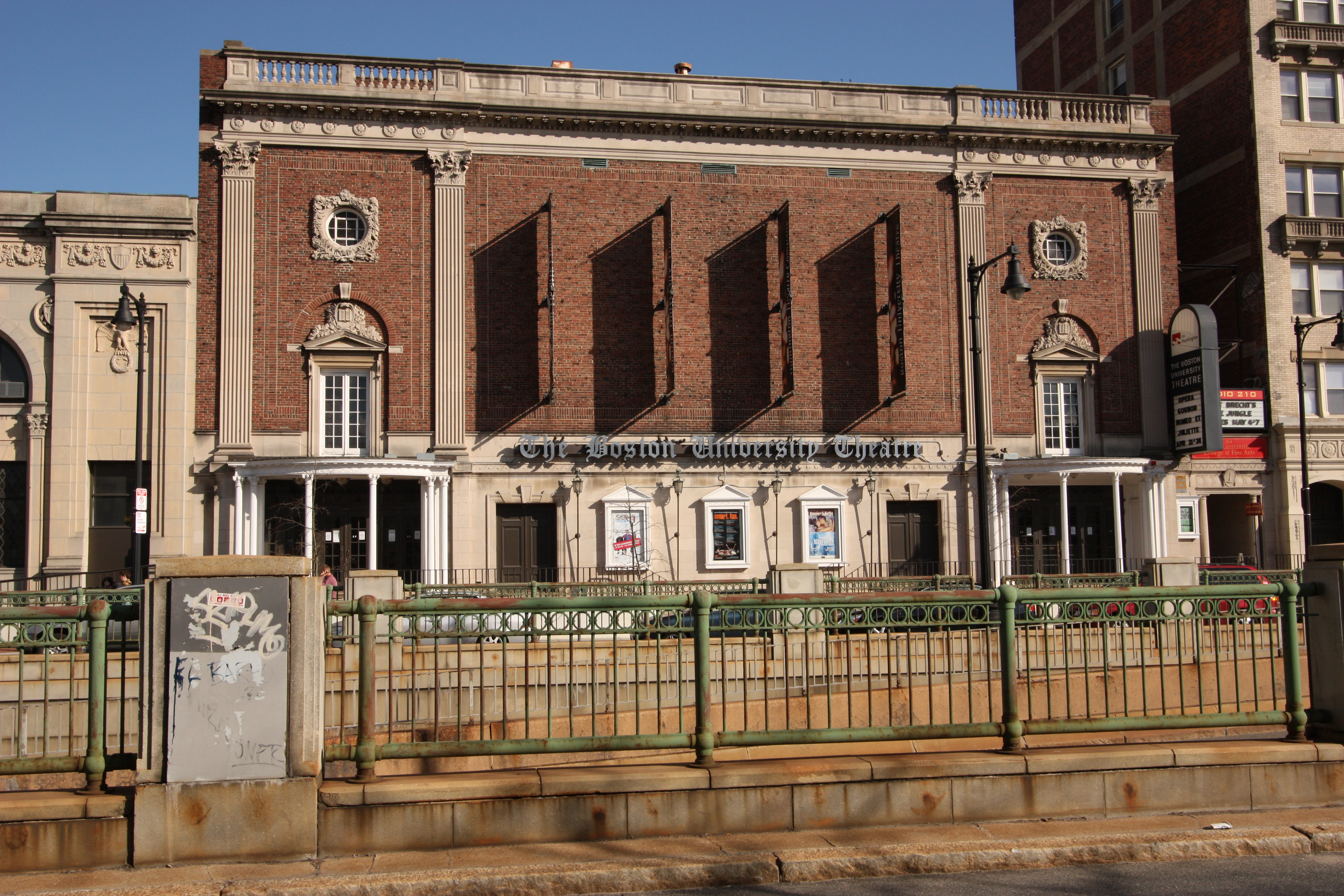
The Huntington Avenue Theatre, formerly of Boston University, where Moore trained to be an actress

Due to her father's occupation, Moore frequently moved around the United States as a child. She was close with her family as a result, but says that she never had the feeling of coming from one particular place. The family lived in multiple locations including Alabama, Georgia, Texas, Panama, Nebraska, Alaska, New York, and Virginia, and Moore attended nine different schools. The constant moving around made her an insecure child, and she struggled to establish friendships. In spite of the difficulties, Moore has remarked that an itinerant lifestyle was beneficial to her future career: "When you move around a lot, you learn that behavior is mutable. I would change, depending on where I was... It teaches you to watch, to reinvent, that character can change."

When Moore was 16, the family moved from Falls Church, Virginia, where Moore was attending J.E.B. Stuart High School, to Frankfurt, West Germany, where she went to Frankfurt American High School. She was clever and studious, a self-proclaimed "good girl", and she planned to become a doctor. She had never considered performing or even attending the theater, but she was an avid reader which led her to begin acting in school productions. Moore appeared in several plays including Tartuffe and Medea, and with the encouragement of her English teacher, she chose to pursue a theatrical career. Her parents supported her decision, but asked that she train at a university to provide the added security of a college degree. She was accepted into the Boston University College of Fine Arts in Boston and graduated in 1983 with a Bachelor of Fine Arts in theater.

== Career ==
=== Early work and breakthrough (1985–1993) ===
"There was already a Julie Smith, a Julie Anne Smith, there was everything. My father's middle name is Moore; my mother's name is Anne. So I just slammed the Anne onto the Julie. That way, I could use both of their names and not hurt anyone's feelings. But it's horrible to change your name. I'd been Julie Smith my whole life, and I didn't want to change it."

— Moore explaining why and how she adopted her stage name

Moore moved to Manhattan, New York after graduating and worked as a waitress. After registering her stage name with Actors' Equity, she started her career in 1985 off-Broadway. Her first screen role came in 1984, in an episode of the soap opera The Edge of Night. Her break was a year later when she joined the cast of As the World Turns. Playing the dual roles of half-sisters Frannie and Sabrina Hughes, she found the intensive work to be an important learning experience and she said, "I gained confidence and learned to take responsibility."

Moore performed on the show until 1988, when she won a Daytime Emmy Award for Outstanding Ingenue in a Drama Series. Before leaving As the World Turns, she had a role in the 1987 CBS miniseries I'll Take Manhattan. Once she finished her contract at World Turns, she played Ophelia in a Guthrie Theater production of Hamlet opposite Željko Ivanek. The actress returned intermittently to television over the next three years, appearing in the TV movies Money, Power, Murder (1989), The Last to Go (1991), and Cast a Deadly Spell (1991). In 1990, Moore began working with stage director Andre Gregory on a workshop theatre production of Chekhov's Uncle Vanya. Described by Moore as being "one of the most fundamentally important acting experiences I ever had", the group took four years to explore the text and then give intimate performances to friends. Also in 1990, Moore made her cinematic debut as a mummy's victim in Tales from the Darkside: The Movie, a low-budget horror that she later called "terrible".

Her next film role, in 1992, introduced her to a wide audience. The thriller The Hand That Rocks the Cradle—in which she played the main character's ill-fated friend—was number one at the US box office, and Moore caught the attention of several critics for her performance. She followed it the same year with the crime comedy The Gun in Betty Lou's Handbag, appearing as the protagonist's kooky sister. She continued to play supporting roles throughout 1993, first featuring in the erotic thriller Body of Evidence as Madonna's love rival. The film was panned by reviewers and heavily mocked, and Moore subsequently regretted her involvement—terming it "a big mistake". She had greater success in a 1993 romantic comedy with Johnny Depp. In Benny & Joon, Moore played a gentle waitress who falls for Aidan Quinn's character, Benny. She also appeared briefly as a doctor in one of the year's biggest hits, the Harrison Ford-starring thriller The Fugitive. Filmmaker Robert Altman saw Moore in the Uncle Vanya production and was sufficiently impressed to cast her in his next project: the ensemble drama Short Cuts (1993), based on short stories by Raymond Carver. Moore was pleased to work with him, as his film 3 Women (1977) gave her a strong appreciation for cinema when she saw it while in college. Playing artist Marian Wyman was an experience she found difficult, as she was a "total unknown" surrounded by established actors, but this proved to be Moore's breakthrough role. Todd McCarthy called her performance "arresting" and remarked that her monologue, delivered naked from the waist down would "no doubt be the most discussed scene" of the film. Short Cuts was critically acclaimed and received awards for Best Ensemble Cast at the Venice Film Festival and the Golden Globe Awards. Moore received an individual nomination for Best Supporting Female at the Independent Spirit Awards, and the monologue scene earned her a degree of notoriety.

=== Rise to prominence (1994–1997) ===
Short Cuts was one of a trio of successive film appearances that raised Moore's profile. In 1994, Vanya on 42nd Street came out, a filmed version of her ongoing Uncle Vanya workshop production, directed by Louis Malle. Moore's performance of Yelena was called "simply outstanding" by Time Out, and she won the Boston Society of Film Critics award for Best Actress. Afterwards Moore was given her first leading role, playing an unhappy suburban housewife who develops multiple chemical sensitivity in Todd Haynes' low-budget film Safe (1995). She had to lose a substantial amount of weight for the role, which made her ill, and she then swore off changing her body for a film again. In its review, Empire, a British magazine, said that Safe "first established [Moore's] credentials as perhaps the finest actress of her generation". David Thomson wrote that it is "one of the most arresting, original and accomplished films of the 1990s." The performance earned Moore an Independent Spirit Award nomination for Best Actress. Reflecting on the three roles Moore said, "They all came out at once, and I suddenly had this profile. It was amazing."

Moore's next appearance was a supporting role in the comedy-drama Roommates (1995), playing the daughter-in-law of Peter Falk's character. Her next film, Nine Months (1995) was crucial in establishing her as a Hollywood leading lady. The romantic comedy, directed by Chris Columbus and co-starring Hugh Grant, was poorly reviewed but a box office success; it remains one of her highest-grossing films. In her next release Moore appeared alongside Sylvester Stallone and Antonio Banderas in the thriller Assassins (1995). Despite a negative response from critics, the film earned $83.5 million worldwide. In her sole appearance in 1996, the Merchant Ivory film Surviving Picasso, she played the artist Dora Maar opposite Anthony Hopkins. The period drama met with poor reviews.

A key point in her career came when Steven Spielberg cast Moore as paleontologist Dr. Sarah Harding in The Lost World: Jurassic Park – the sequel to his 1993 blockbuster Jurassic Park. Filming the big-budget production was a new experience for Moore and she said she enjoyed herself "tremendously". It was a physically demanding role and she commented, "There was so much hanging everywhere. We hung off everything available, plus we climbed, ran, jumped off things... it was just non-stop." The Lost World (1997) was one of the ten highest-grossing films in history at the time and was pivotal in raising Moore's profile, "Suddenly I had a commercial film career", she said. The Myth of Fingerprints was her second film released in 1997. During its production she met her future husband, the movie's director Bart Freundlich. Later in 1997, Moore made a cameo appearance in the dark comedy Chicago Cab.

Moore's first Academy Award nomination came for the critically acclaimed Boogie Nights (1997), which centers on a group of individuals working in the 1970s pornography industry. Director Paul Thomas Anderson was not a well-known figure before its production, with only one feature credit to his name, but Moore agreed to the film after being impressed with his "exhilarating" script. The ensemble piece featured Moore as Amber Waves, a leading porn actress and mother-figure who longs to be re-united with her real son. Martyn Glanville of the BBC said that the role required a mixture of confidence and vulnerability and was impressed with Moore's effort. Time Out called the performance "superb" and Janet Maslin of The New York Times found it "wonderful". Alongside her Oscar nomination for Best Supporting Actress, Moore was nominated for Golden Globe and Screen Actors Guild awards and several critics groups gave her awards.

=== Gaining further recognition (1998–2002) ===
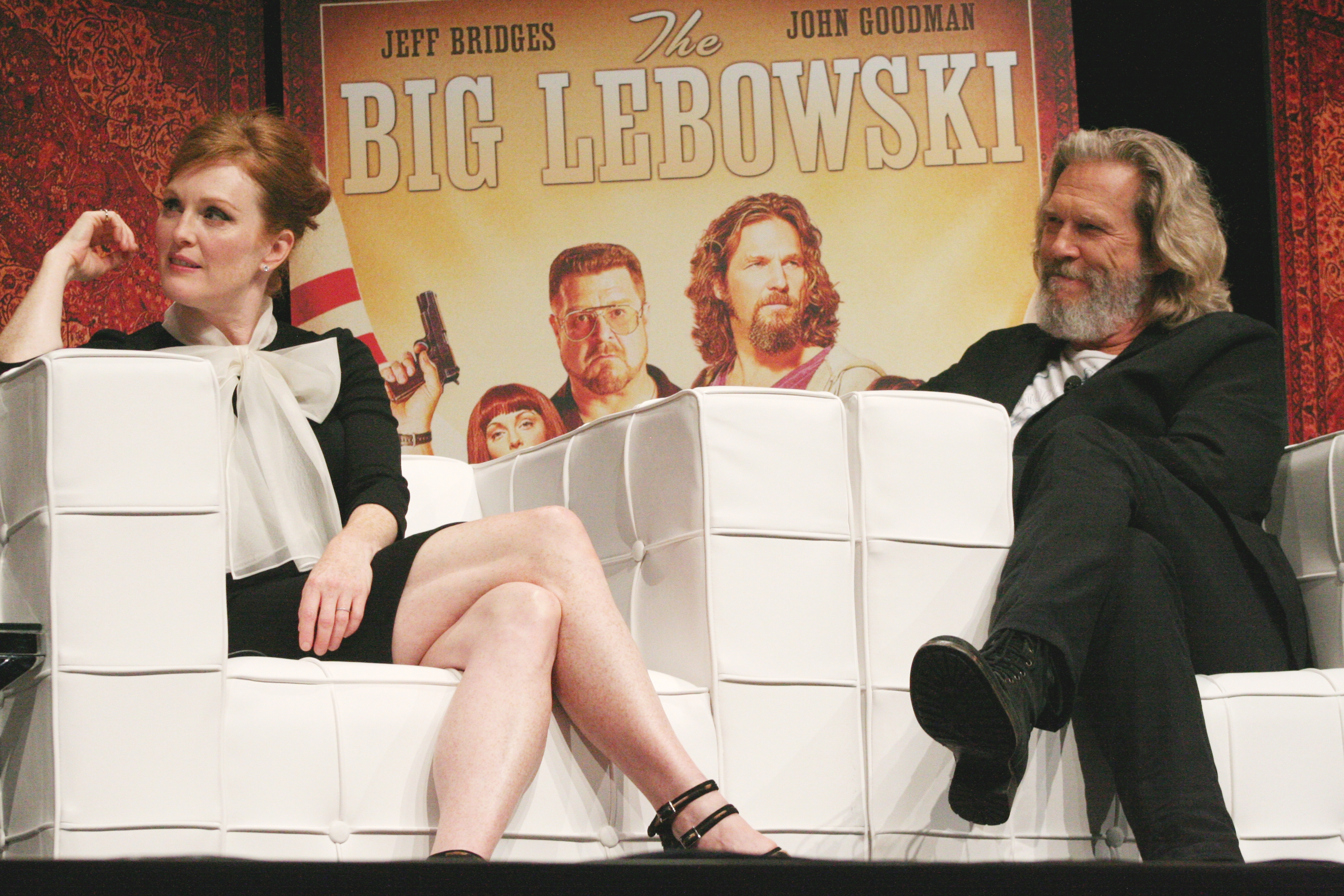
Moore played Maude Lebowski in The Big Lebowski (1998). She is pictured alongside Jeff Bridges who co-starred in the film, at the 2011 Lebowski Fest at the Hammerstein Ballroom in Manhattan.

Next was a role in the Coen brothers' dark comedy The Big Lebowski (1998). The film was not a hit at the time of its release but has since become a cult classic. She played Maude Lebowski, a feminist artist and daughter of the eponymous character who becomes involved with "The Dude" (Jeff Bridges, the film's star). At the end of 1998, Moore had a flop with Gus Van Sant's Psycho, a remake of the classic Alfred Hitchcock film of the same name. She portrayed Lila Crane in the film, which received poor reviews and is described by The Guardian as being one of her "pointless" outings. A review in Boxoffice magazine bemoaned that "a group of enormously talented people wasted several months of their lives" working on the film.

After re-uniting with Robert Altman for the dark comedy Cookie's Fortune (1999), Moore starred in An Ideal Husband – Oliver Parker's adaptation of the Oscar Wilde play. Set in London at the end of the nineteenth century, her performance of Mrs. Laura Cheverly earned a Golden Globe nomination for Best Actress in a Musical or Comedy. She was also nominated in the drama category that year for her work in The End of the Affair (1999). Based on the novel by Graham Greene, Moore played opposite Ralph Fiennes as an adulterous wife in 1940s Britain. Michael Sragow lauded her writing that her performance was "the critical element that makes [the film] necessary viewing." She received her second Academy Award nomination for the role, her first for Best Actress, as well as nominations at the British Academy Film Awards (BAFTA) and Screen Actors Guild (SAG) awards.

In between the two Golden Globe-nominated performances, Moore was in A Map of the World supporting Sigourney Weaver, as a bereaved mother. Her fifth film of 1999 was the acclaimed drama Magnolia, a "giant mosaic" chronicling the lives of multiple characters over one day in Los Angeles. Paul Thomas Anderson, in his follow-up to Boogie Nights, wrote a role specifically for her. His primary objective was to "see her explode", and he cast her as a morphine-addicted wife. Moore said it was a particularly difficult role and she was rewarded with a SAG nomination. She was named Best Supporting Actress of 1999 by the National Board of Review, in recognition of her three performances in Magnolia, An Ideal Husband, and A Map of the World.

Apart from a cameo in The Ladies Man, a comedy, Moore's other appearance in 2000 was in a short-film adaptation of Samuel Beckett's play Not I. In early 2001, she appeared as FBI agent Clarice Starling in Hannibal, a sequel to the Oscar-winning film The Silence of the Lambs. Jodie Foster had declined to reprise the role, and director Ridley Scott eventually cast Moore over Angelina Jolie, Cate Blanchett, Gillian Anderson, and Helen Hunt. The news received considerable attention from the press but Moore said she was not interested in nor capable of upstaging Foster. Although it got mixed reviews, Hannibal earned $58 million in its opening weekend and finished as the tenth-highest-grossing film of the year.

Moore starred in three more 2001 releases: with David Duchovny in the science fiction comedy Evolution, in her husband's dramatic film World Traveler, and with Kevin Spacey, Judi Dench, and Cate Blanchett in The Shipping News. All three films were poorly received. The year 2002 marked a high point in Moore's career, as she became the ninth performer to be nominated for two Academy Awards in the same year. She received a Best Actress nomination for the melodrama Far from Heaven, in which she played a 1950s housewife whose world is shaken when her husband reveals he is gay. The role was written specifically for her by Todd Haynes, the first time the pair had worked together since Safe, and Moore described it as "a very, very personal project ... such an incredible honor to do". David Rooney of Variety praised her "beautifully gauged performance" of a desperate woman "buckling under social pressures and putting on a brave face". Manohla Dargis of the Los Angeles Times wrote, "what Moore does with her role is so beyond the parameters of what we call great acting that it nearly defies categorization". The role won Moore the Best Actress award from 19 different organizations, including the Venice Film Festival and the National Board of Review.

Moore's second Oscar nomination that year came for The Hours, in which she co-starred with Nicole Kidman and Meryl Streep. She again played a troubled 1950s housewife, prompting Kenneth Turan to write that she was "essentially reprising her Far from Heaven role". Moore said it was an "unfortunate coincidence" that the similar roles came at the same time, and that the characters had differing personalities. Peter Travers of Rolling Stone called the performance "wrenching", while Peter Bradshaw of The Guardian praised a "superbly controlled, humane performance". The Hours was nominated for nine Academy Awards, including Best Picture. Moore also received BAFTA and SAG Award nominations for Best Supporting Actress, and was jointly awarded the Silver Bear for Best Actress with Kidman and Streep at the Berlin International Film Festival.

=== Established actress (2003–2009) ===
Moore did not make any screen appearances in 2003, but returned in 2004 with three movies. Her first two ventures of the year were not successful. Marie and Bruce, a dark comedy co-starring Matthew Broderick, did not get a cinematic release. Laws of Attraction followed. Pierce Brosnan also starred in the romantic comedy based in a courtroom; the film was panned by critics. Commercial success for Moore came with The Forgotten, a psychological thriller in which she played a mother who is told her dead son never existed. Although the film was unpopular with critics, it opened as the US box office number one.

In 2005, Moore worked with her husband for the third time in the comedy Trust the Man, and starred in the true story of 1950s housewife Evelyn Ryan in The Prize Winner of Defiance, Ohio. Her first release of 2006 was Freedomland, a mystery co-starring Samuel L. Jackson. The response was overwhelmingly negative, but her follow-up, Alfonso Cuarón's Children of Men (2006), was highly acclaimed. Moore had a supporting role in the dystopian drama, playing the leader of an activist group. It is listed on Rotten Tomatoes as one of the best reviewed films of her career, and was named by Peter Travers as the second best film of the decade.

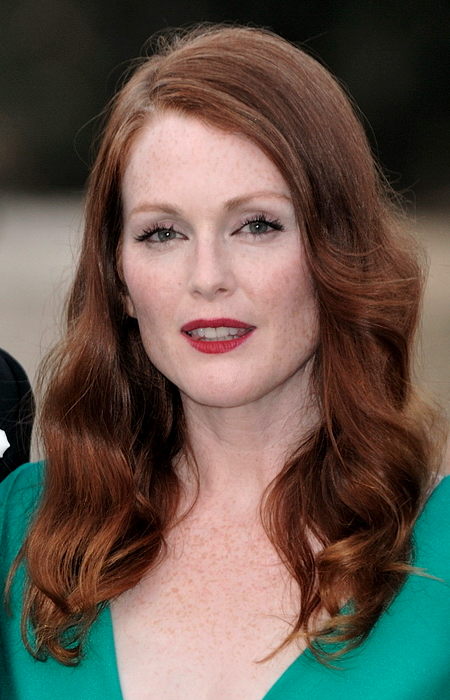
Moore at the 2009 Venice International Film Festival

Moore made her Broadway debut in the world premiere of David Hare's play The Vertical Hour. The production, directed by Sam Mendes and co-starring Bill Nighy, opened in November 2006. Moore played the role of Nadia, a former war correspondent who finds her views on the 2003 invasion of Iraq challenged. Ben Brantley of The New York Times was unenthusiastic about the production, and described Moore as miscast: in his opinion, she failed to bring the "tough, assertive" quality that her role required. David Rooney of Variety criticized her "lack of stage technique", adding that she appeared "stiffly self-conscious". Moore later admitted she found it difficult performing on Broadway and had not connected with the medium, but was glad to have experimented with it. The play closed in March 2007 after 117 performances.

Moore played an FBI agent for the second time in Next (2007), a science fiction action film co-starring Nicolas Cage and Jessica Biel. Based on a short story by Philip K. Dick, the response from critics was highly negative. Manohla Dargis wrote, "Ms. Moore seems terribly unhappy to be here, and it's no wonder." The actress has since said it was her worst film. Savage Grace (2007) followed, the true story of Barbara Daly Baekeland – a high-society mother whose Oedipal relationship with her son ended in murder. Moore was fascinated by the role. Savage Grace had a limited release, and received predominantly negative reviews. Peter Bradshaw, however, called it a "coldly brilliant and tremendously acted movie".

In I'm Not There (2007), Moore worked with Todd Haynes for a third time. The film explored the life of Bob Dylan, with Moore playing a character based on Joan Baez. In 2008, she starred with Mark Ruffalo in Blindness, a dystopian thriller from the director Fernando Meirelles. The film was not widely seen, and critics were generally unenthusiastic. Moore was not seen on screen again until late 2009, with three new releases. She had a supporting role in The Private Lives of Pippa Lee, and then starred in the erotic thriller Chloe with Liam Neeson and Amanda Seyfried. Shortly afterwards, she appeared in the well-received drama A Single Man. Set in 1960s Los Angeles, the film starred Colin Firth as a homosexual professor who wishes to end his life. Moore played his best friend, "a fellow English expat and semi-alcoholic divorcee", a character that Tom Ford, the film's writer-director, created with her in mind. Leslie Felperin of Variety commented that it was Moore's best role in "some time", and was impressed by the "extraordinary emotional nuance" of her performance. A Single Man was selected as one of the top 10 films of 2009 by the American Film Institute, and Moore received a fifth Golden Globe nomination for her performance in the film.

=== Return to television and comedic films (2010–2013) ===
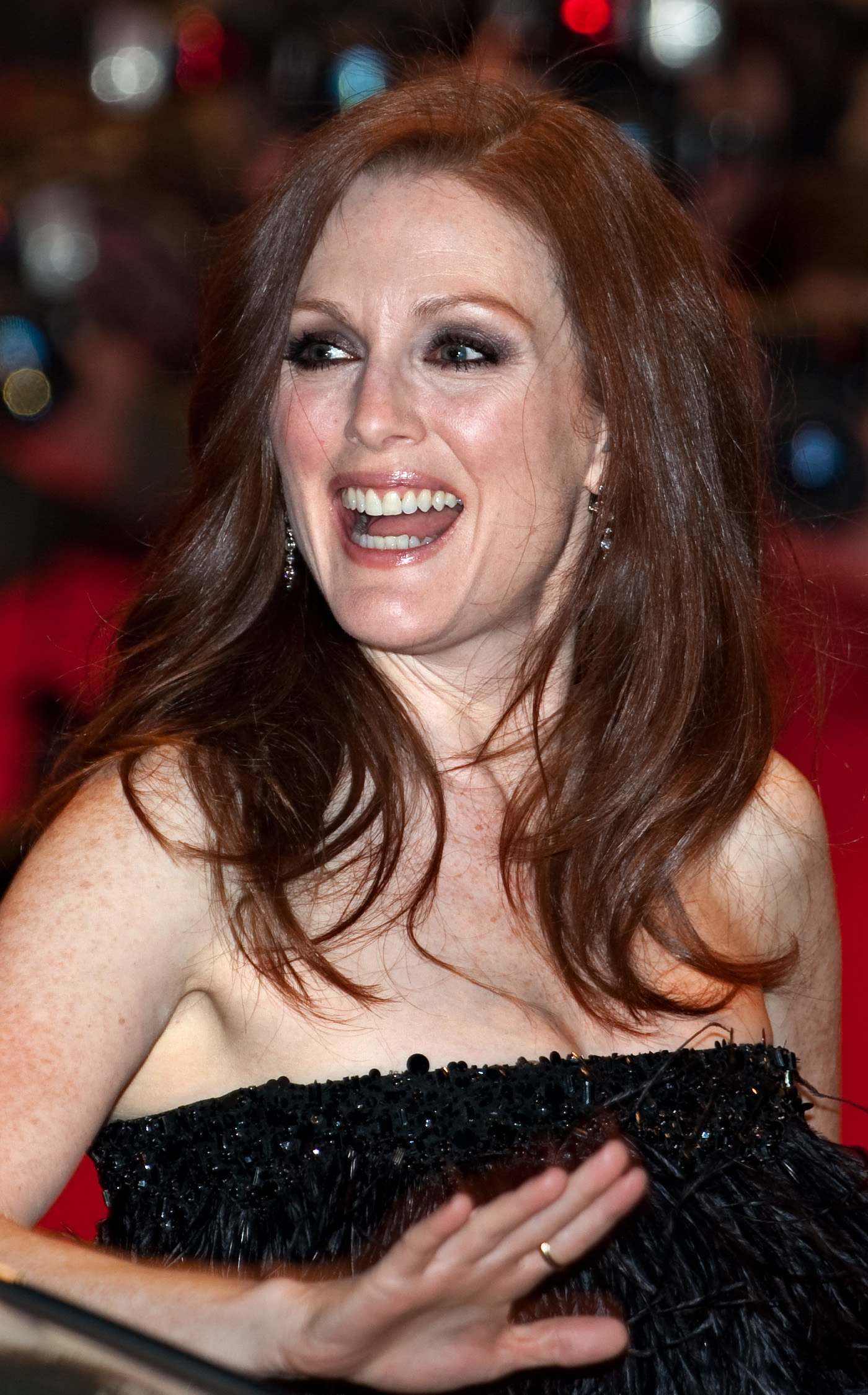
Moore at the premiere of The Kids Are All Right at the 2010 Berlin International Film Festival

Moore was on television for the first time in 18 years when she played a guest role in the fourth season of 30 Rock. She was in five episodes of the Emmy-winning comedy playing Nancy Donovan, a love interest to Alec Baldwin's character Jack Donaghy. She appeared in the series finale in January 2013. She also returned to As the World Turns as Frannie Hughes, making a brief cameo appearance in a scene with her character's family near the end of the show's run in 2010.

Her first big-screen appearance of the new decade was Shelter (2010), a film labeled as "heinous" by Tim Robey of The Daily Telegraph. The psychological thriller received negative reviews and did not have a U.S. release until 2013 (when it was retitled 6 Souls). Moore starred with Annette Bening in the independent film The Kids Are All Right (2010), a comedy-drama about a lesbian couple whose teenage children find their sperm donor. The role of Jules Allgood was written for her by writer-director Lisa Cholodenko, who felt that Moore was the right age, adept at both drama and comedy, and confident with the film's sexual content. The actress was drawn to the film's "universal" depiction of married life, and committed to the project in 2005. The Kids Are All Right was widely acclaimed, eventually garnering an Oscar nomination for Best Picture. Betsy Sharkey, a critic, liked Moore's performance of Jules calling it an "existential bundle of unrealized need and midlife uncertainty." She wrote, "There are countless moments when the actress strips bare before the camera–sometimes literally, sometimes emotionally... and Moore plays every note perfectly." The Kids Are All Right earned Moore a sixth Golden Globe Award nomination and a second BAFTA nomination for Best Actress.

"I read her biography, books that were written about her and the election, listened to her voice endlessly on my iPod and worked with a vocal coach. I basically immersed myself in the study of her, and attempted to authenticate her as completely as possible ... It was tremendously challenging to represent someone so very well-known and idiosyncratic, and so recently in the public eye."

— Moore on portraying Sarah Palin in Game Change

Julianne Moore actively looked for another comedy. She had a supporting role in Crazy, Stupid, Love, playing the estranged wife of Steve Carell, which was favorably reviewed and earned $142.8 million worldwide. She did not appear on screens again until March 2012, with a performance that received considerable praise and recognition. She starred in the HBO television film Game Change, a dramatization of Sarah Palin's 2008 campaign to become Vice President. Portraying a well-known figure was something she found challenging; in preparation, she conducted extensive research and worked with a dialect coach for two months. Although the response to the film was mixed, critics were appreciative of Moore's performance. For the first time in her career, she received a Golden Globe, a Primetime Emmy, and a SAG Award.

Moore made two film appearances in 2012. The drama Being Flynn, in which she supported Robert De Niro, had a limited release. What Maisie Knew had a wider release, the story of a young girl caught in the middle of her parents' divorce. Adapted from Henry James's novel and updated for the 21st century, the drama earned near-universal critical praise. The role of Susanna, Maisie's rock-star mother, required Moore to sing on camera, which was a challenge she embraced despite finding it embarrassing. She called Susanna a terrible parent, but said the role did not make her uncomfortable, as she fully compartmentalized the character: "I know that that's not me".

What Maisie Knew was well received. In 2013 Moore had a supporting role in Joseph Gordon-Levitt's comedy Don Jon, playing an older woman who helps the title character to appreciate his relationships. Reviews for the film were favorable and Mary Pols of Time felt that Moore was a key factor in its success. Her next appearance was a starring role in the comedy The English Teacher (2013), but the outing was poorly received and earned little at the box office. In October 2013, she played the demented mother Margaret White in Carrie, an adaptation of Stephen King's horror novel. Coming 37 years after Brian De Palma's well-known take on the book, Moore said that she wanted to make the role her own. By drawing on King's writing rather than the 1976 film, Mick LaSalle of the San Francisco Chronicle wrote that she managed to "[suggest] a history – one never told, just hinted at – of serious damage in [Margaret's] past". Although the film was a box office success, it was generally considered an unsuccessful and unnecessary adaptation.

=== Critical and commercial success (2014–2017) ===
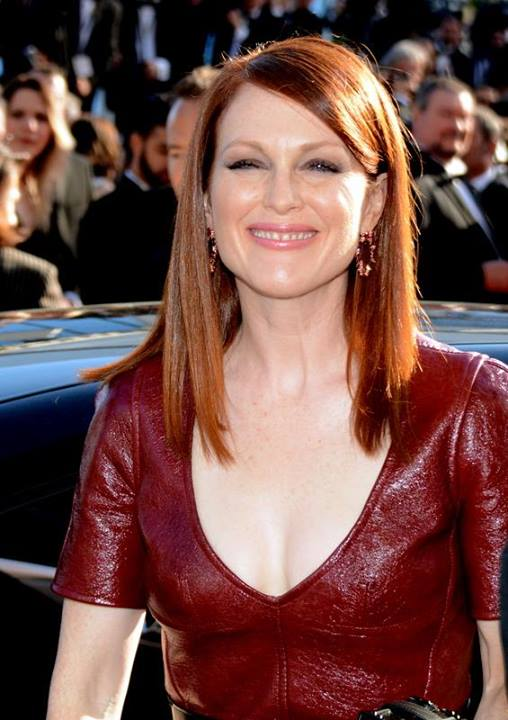
Moore at the 2014 Cannes Film Festival, where she won the Best Actress award for Maps to the Stars

Moore enjoyed a considerable degree of critical and commercial success in 2014. Her first release of the year came alongside Liam Neeson in the action-thriller Non-Stop, set aboard an airplane. The response to the film was mixed, but it earned $223 million worldwide. Moore won the Best Actress award at the Cannes Festival for her performance as Havana Segrand, an aging actress receiving psychotherapy in David Cronenberg's black comedy Maps to the Stars. Described by The Guardian as being a "grotesque, gaudy, and ruthless" character, Moore based her role on "an amalgam of Hollywood casualties she ha[d] encountered", and drew upon her early experiences in the industry. Peter Debruge of Variety was critical of the film, but found Moore to be "incredible" and "fearless" in it. Moore's success at Cannes made her the second actress after Juliette Binoche, to win Best Actress awards at the "Big Three" film festivals (Berlin, Cannes, and Venice). She received a Golden Globe nomination for her performance.

Moore played the supporting role of President Alma Coin, the leader of a rebellion against The Capitol, in the third installment of the lucrative The Hunger Games film series, Mockingjay – Part 1. The film ranks as her highest-grossing to date. Her final film performance of 2014 ranks among the most acclaimed of her career. In the drama Still Alice, Moore played the leading role of a linguistics professor diagnosed with early onset Alzheimer's disease. She spent four months training for the film, by watching documentaries on the disease and interacting with patients at the Alzheimer's Association. David Thomson wrote that Moore was "extraordinary at revealing the gradual loss of memory and confidence", while according to Kenneth Turan, she was "especially good at the wordless elements of this transformation, allowing us to see through the changing contours of her face what it is like when your mind empties out". Several critics felt it was her finest performance to date, and Moore was awarded with the Golden Globe, SAG, BAFTA, and Academy Award for Best Actress.

Moore began 2015 by appearing as an evil queen in Seventh Son, a poorly received fantasy-adventure film co-starring Jeff Bridges. She also appeared opposite Elliot Page in Freeheld, a drama based on a true story about a detective and her same-sex partner, and in the romantic comedy Maggie's Plan, with Greta Gerwig and Ethan Hawke. Both films were presented at the 2015 Toronto International Film Festival. In Maggie's Plan, Moore played a pretentious Danish professor, a comedic role that critic Richard Lawson of Vanity Fair deemed as the film's "chief pleasure". Later that year, she reprised her role as Alma Coin in The Hunger Games: Mockingjay – Part 2, the final film of the series.

After a year absence from the screen, Moore had three films come out in 2017. She appeared in a dual role in Wonderstruck, a film adaptation of Brian Selznick's historical children's novel of the same name, reteaming her with Todd Haynes. Her parts were of a silent movie star in the 1920s and a deaf librarian in the 1970s; in preparation, she studied sign language and watched the films of Lillian Gish. Richard Lawson considered her to be "eminently watchable" despite her limited screen time. Moore portrayed a dual role for the second time that year in Suburbicon, a satirical thriller written by the Coen brothers and directed by George Clooney. She was cast opposite Matt Damon in a dual role as twin sisters in 1950s America, named Rose and Margaret, who become embroiled in a local crime. The film received negative reviews, with critics saying it failed to effectively portray American racism, but Geoffrey Macnab of The Independent praised Moore for giving "a perfectly judged comic performance as a Barbara Stanwyck-like femme fatale".

Moore's final release of 2017 was the sequel to the 2015 spy film Kingsman: The Secret Service, subtitled The Golden Circle, co-starring Colin Firth, Taron Egerton, Channing Tatum, and Halle Berry. She played the part of the villainous entrepreneur Poppy Adams, who runs a drug cartel. Despite her character's actions, Moore played the part to make Poppy seem "strange, but reasonable". Peter Debruge described the film as "outlandish", and wrote that Moore had played her part "as Martha Stewart crossed with a demonic 1950s housewife". The film earned over $410 million worldwide.

=== Independent films and streaming projects (2018–present) ===
Moore had two films premiere in 2018. She was drawn to Sebastián Lelio's Gloria Bell, an English-language remake of Lelio's own Chilean film Gloria, for its rare depiction of a middle-age woman's quest for meaning in life. Stephen Dalton of The Hollywood Reporter believed she had delivered "an utterly natural and quietly spellbinding star performance," and The New York Times named her one of "the 10 best actors of the year." Her second film that year was Bel Canto, a thriller based on Ann Patchett's novel of the same name about the Japanese embassy hostage crisis in Lima, Peru. For her performance as an opera singer, she learned to mimic the body language of professionals for scenes in which Renée Fleming performed the vocals. Guy Lodge of the Chicago Tribune deemed the film to be an unsuccessful adaptation of the novel and considered Moore's work to be "edgeless fare by her standards". In 2019, she teamed with her husband again in After the Wedding, a remake of Susanne Bier's Danish film of the same name. It featured her and Michelle Williams in roles played by men in the original film. Also in 2019, she starred in The Staggering Girl, a short film directed by Luca Guadagnino.

In 2020, Moore portrayed the feminist activist Gloria Steinem in the biopic The Glorias, sharing the part with actresses Alicia Vikander and Lulu Wilson. In following year, she had supporting roles opposite Amy Adams in Joe Wright's thriller The Woman in the Window, based on the novel of the same name, and in Stephen Chbosky's musical film Dear Evan Hansen, based on the stage musical of the same name. Both films were poorly received. Moore played the title role in Lisey's Story, an Apple TV+ miniseries adapted from Stephen King's thriller novel of the same name. The miniseries was not well received, despite praise for Moore's work. She took on the leading role of an uptight mother in When You Finish Saving the World (2022), a comedy-drama film by Jesse Eisenberg. The Hollywood Reporter's John DeFore commended her for empathetically portraying an unlikable character. Moore served as jury president of the 79th Venice International Film Festival in 2022.

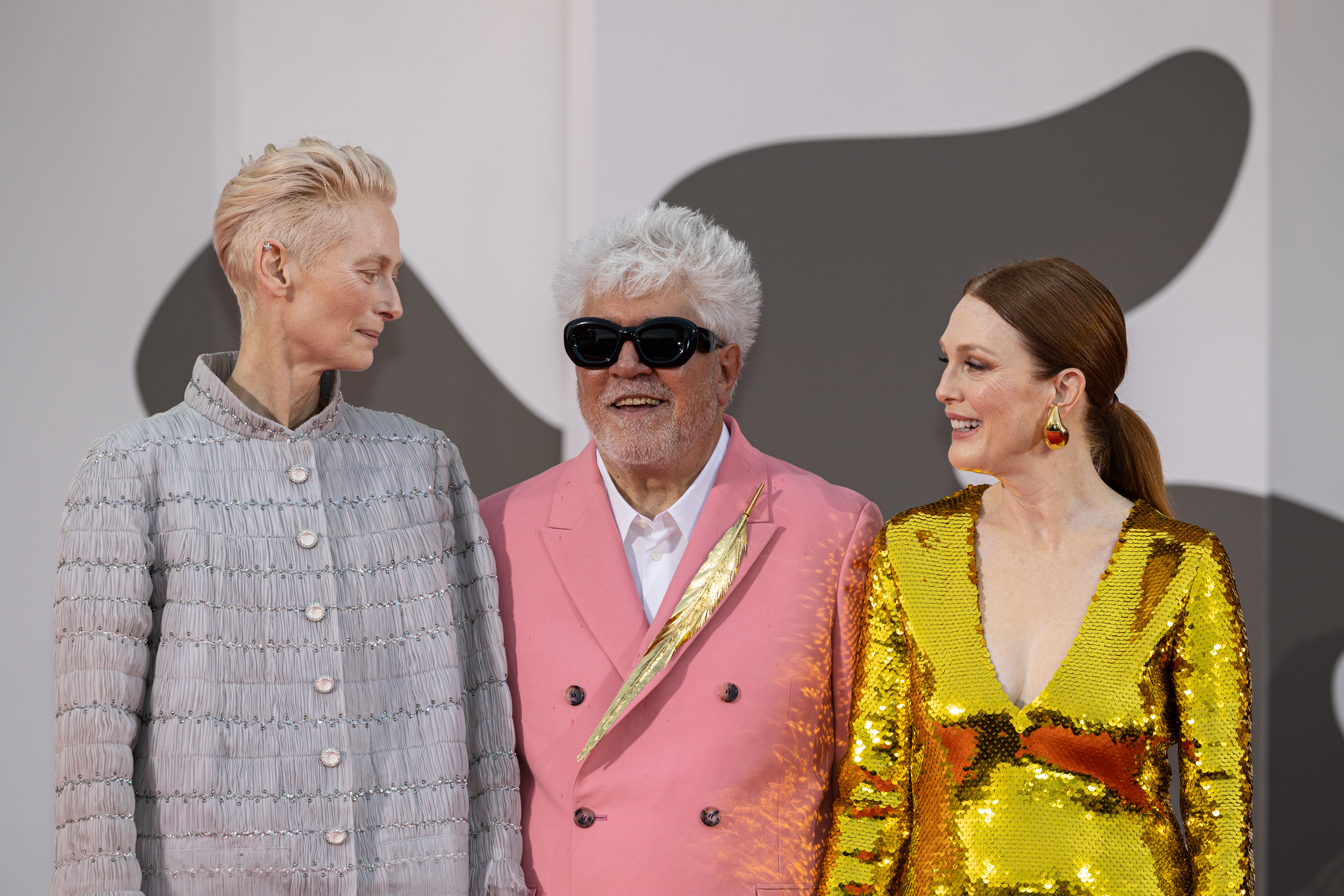
Moore, on right, with Tilda Swinton and Pedro Almodóvar at the premiere for The Room Next Door at the 2024 Venice International Film Festival

Moore next starred in the thriller Sharper (2023) for Apple TV+, which she also produced; it had modest reviews. Once again, she collaborated with Todd Haynes in May December, a drama co-starring Natalie Portman, in which she played a woman married to a much-younger man. Moore was pleased to play a transgressive character, finding her "unbelievably complicated and compelling". The film received critical acclaim and Jonathan Romney of Screen Daily commended Moore for combining both "neurotic fragility and over-bearing brittleness" in her performance. She received another Golden Globe nomination for it.

The 2024 historical satire miniseries Mary & George starred Moore as Mary Villiers opposite Nicholas Galitzine's George Villiers. The Independent's Nick Hilton found Moore "more effective in Mary's dramatic moments than her farcical ones," while Lucy Mangan of The Guardian called her performance "brilliant – cold, clever and always scintillating." It earned her another Independent Spirit Award nomination. The same year, Moore starred alongside Tilda Swinton in The Room Next Door, which marked Pedro Almodóvar's first English-language feature film and won the Golden Lion at the 2024 Venice Film Festival. Based on the novel What Are You Going Through by Sigrid Nunez, Moore played an author who reunites with a former colleague with cancer. She was particularly drawn towards the project for its depiction of female friendship, which she believed was rare in film. Complementing the performances of both women, BBC Culture's Nicholas Barber found Moore "especially deft" in her delivery of Almodóvar's awkwardly written dialogues. She received a Goya Award nomination as Best Actress for the role.

In her third project for Apple TV+, Moore led the thriller film Echo Valley. She will also team with James McAvoy in the action thriller film Control.

== Writing ==
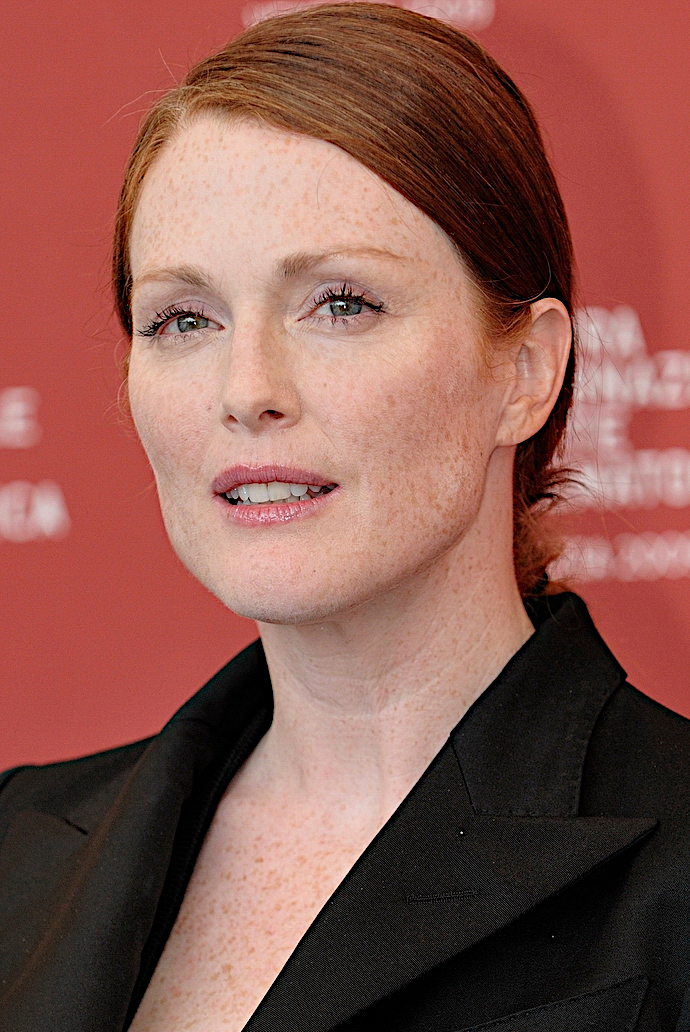
Moore at the 2009 Venice International Film Festival

Alongside acting work, Moore became an author of children's books. Her first book, Freckleface Strawberry, was published in October 2007 and became a New York Times Best Seller. Time Out says that it is a "simple, sweet and semi-autobiographical narrative." It is about a girl who wishes to be rid of her freckles but comes to accept them. Moore decided to write the book when her young son began disliking aspects of his appearance; she was reminded of her own childhood, when she was teased for having freckles and called "Freckleface Strawberry" by other children.

The book turned into a series with six sequels as of 2016: Freckleface Strawberry and the Dodgeball Bully was published in 2009, and Freckleface Strawberry: Best Friends Forever in 2011. Both have the message that children can overcome their problems. Freckleface Strawberry: Backpacks!, Freckleface Strawberry: Lunch, or What's That? and Freckleface Strawberry: Loose Tooth! were released as part of Random House's "Step Into Reading" program. They were followed by Freckleface Strawberry and the Really Big Voice in summer 2016.

Freckleface Strawberry has been adapted into a musical, written by Rose Caiola and Gary Kupper, which premiered off-Broadway at the New World Stages in Manhattan, in October 2010. Moore had input in the production, particularly by requesting that it retain the book's young target audience. The show has been licensed and performed at several venues, which she calls "extremely gratifying and extremely flattering". Moore wrote a children's book separate from the Freckleface Strawberry series. Released in 2013, My Mom is a Foreigner, But Not to Me is based on her experiences of growing up with a mother from another country. The book had a negative reception from Publishers Weekly and Kirkus Reviews; while recognizing it as well-intentioned, Moore's use of verse and rhyme was criticized.

In February 2025, under the second Trump administration, an executive order required about 160 Defense Department-run schools to conduct a compliance review of books regarding “gender ideology” and “racial indoctrination”. After Moore said that her Freckleface Strawberry book was banned by the Pentagon, some media headlines implied that there was a wholesale ban of the book nationwide.

== Artistry and reception ==
Moore has been called one of the most talented and accomplished actresses of her generation in the media. As a woman in her sixties, she is unusual for being an older actress who continues to work regularly and in prominent roles. She enjoys the variety of starring in both low-budget independent films and large-scale Hollywood productions. In 2004, an IGN journalist wrote of her "rare ability to bounce between commercially viable projects like Nine Months to art house masterpieces like Safe unscathed" and added, "She is respected in art houses and multiplexes alike."

Moore is noted for acting in a range of material, and Ridley Scott, who directed her in Hannibal, praised her versatility. In October 2013, she received a star on the Hollywood Walk of Fame. She was named to People magazine's annual beauty lists on four occasions (1995, 2003, 2008, and 2013). In 2015, Time magazine included Moore as one of the 100 most influential people in the world on the annual Time 100 list. In 2020, The New York Times ranked her eleventh on its list of the greatest actors of the 21st century, and in a 2022 readers' poll by Empire, she was voted one of the 50 greatest actors of all time.

"I never care that [my characters] are 'strong'. I never care that they're even affirmative. I look for that thing that's human and recognizable and emotional. You know, we're not perfect, we're not heroic, we're not in control. We're our own worst enemies sometimes, we cause our own tragedies ... that's the stuff that I think is really compelling."

— Moore explaining why she is drawn to playing troubled women

Moore is particularly known for playing troubled women, and specializes in "ordinary women who suppress powerful emotions". Oliver Burkeman of The Guardian wrote that her characters are typically "struggling to maintain a purchase on normality in the face of some secret anguish or creeping awareness of failure". Suzie Mackenzie, also of The Guardian, has identified a theme of "characters in a state of alienation... women who have forgotten or lost themselves. People whose identity is a question." Moore's performances often include small hints at emotional turmoil, until there comes a point when the character breaks. Kira Cochrane, a British journalist, said it is a "trademark moment" in many of her best films, while it led Burkeman to call her the "queen of the big-screen breakdown". "When she does finally crack", says Simon Hattenstone, a British writer, "it's a sight to behold: nobody sobs from the soul quite like Moore." Ben Brantley of The New York Times has praised Moore's ability to subtly reveal the inner-turmoil of her characters, writing that she is "peerless" in her "portraits of troubled womanhood". When it comes to more authoritative roles, Brantley believes she is "a bit of a bore". "Emotional nakedness is Ms. Moore's specialty", he says, "and it's here that you sense the magic she is capable of."

An interest in portraying "actual human drama" led Moore to the parts. She is particularly moved by the concept of an individual repressing their troubles and striving to maintain dignity. Roles where the character achieves an amazing feat are of little interest to her, because "we're just not very often in that position in our lives". Early in her career, she established a reputation for pushing boundaries and she continues to be commended for her "fearless" performances and for taking on difficult roles. When asked if there are any roles she has avoided, she replied, "Nothing within the realm of human behavior." She is known for her willingness to perform nude and appear in sex scenes, although she has said she will only do so if she feels it fits the role.

Regarding her approach to acting, Moore said in a 2002 interview that she leaves 95 percent of the performance to be discovered on set: "I want to have a sense of who a character is, and then I want to get there and have it happen to me on camera." The aim, she said, is to "try to get yourself in a position to let the emotion [happen] to you, that you don't bring the emotion to it... and when it happens, there's nothing better or more exciting or more rewarding."

== Personal life ==
Actor and stage director John Gould Rubin was Moore's first husband. They met in 1984 and married two years later. They separated in 1993 and their divorce was finalized in August 1995. "I got married too early and I really didn't want to be there", she has since said. Moore began a relationship with Bart Freundlich, her director on The Myth of Fingerprints, in 1996. They married on August 23, 2003, and live in Greenwich Village, Manhattan. Moore has two children with Freundlich: a son who was born in 1997 and a daughter who was born in 2002. Moore commented, "We have a very solid family life, and it is the most satisfying thing I have ever done." Moore spoke about how it affected her career choices while her children were young, saying she selected roles which were practical for her as a parent and did not require her to be away for extended periods of time.

Moore was featured in Finding Your Roots on PBS Researchers mapped Moore's family tree and analyzed her DNA. When Moore's friend, actor Marisa Tomei did the same, Tomei and Moore learned they are genetic cousins. Moore is an atheist; when asked on Inside the Actors Studio what God might say to her upon arrival in heaven, she gave God's response as, "Well, I guess you were wrong, I do exist."

Moore is politically liberal and endorsed Barack Obama in the 2008 and 2012 presidential elections. She is a pro-choice activist and sits on the board of advocates for Planned Parenthood. She is a campaigner for gay rights and gun control, and since 2008, she has been an Artist Ambassador for Save the Children. She works with Everytown for Gun Safety. Moore opposes Donald Trump's immigration policies, and in 2020 she supported Joe Biden for president. Moore is a supporter of the Marjory Stoneman Douglas High School students in Parkland, Florida, who organized the March For Our Lives. She helped release a music video for the group.

Moore has said that she finds little value in the concept of celebrity and is concerned with living a "normal" life. After meeting her, Suzie Mackenzie dubbed Moore as "the most unostentatious of stars." Moore attracts little gossip or tabloid attention, and she is humble about her profession ("it's just a person with a job") and casual in her appearance. Moore is known for maintaining a natural image and refrains from botox and plastic surgery. "I feel like it doesn't make people look any younger. It makes them look like they've had surgery", she said in 2009; "It's an aesthetic that's not human."

== Acting credits and awards ==
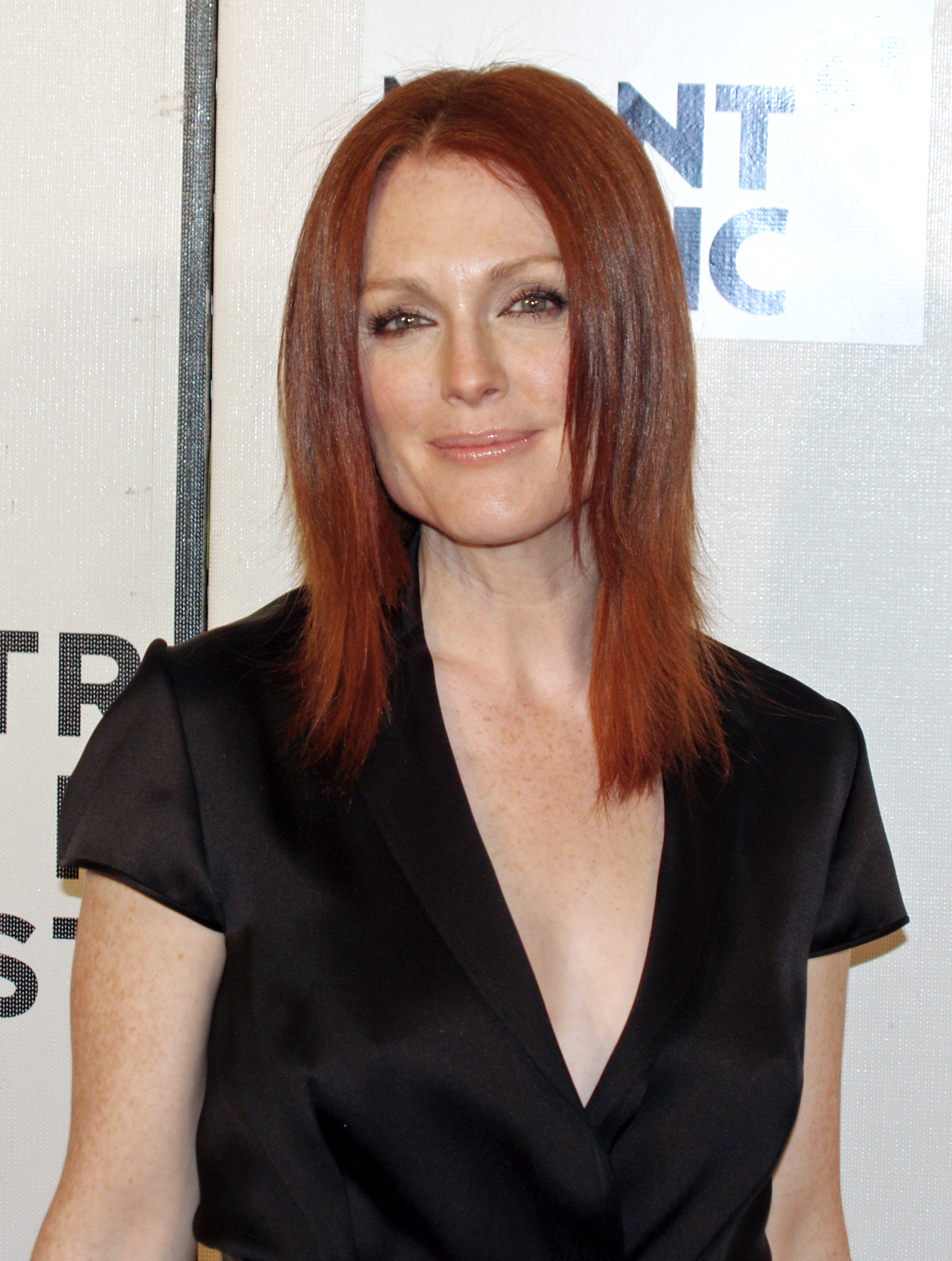
Moore at the 2008 Tribeca Film Festival

Moore's most acclaimed films, according to Rotten Tomatoes, include:

- Short Cuts (1993)
- Vanya on 42nd Street (1994)
- Safe (1995)
- Boogie Nights (1997)
- The Big Lebowski (1998)
- Magnolia (1999)
- The Hours (2002)
- Far from Heaven (2002)
- Children of Men (2006)
- I'm Not There (2007)
- A Single Man (2009)
- The Kids Are All Right (2010)
- Crazy, Stupid, Love (2011)
- What Maisie Knew (2012)
- Don Jon (2013)
- Still Alice (2014)
- Maggie's Plan (2015)
- Gloria Bell (2018)
- May December (2023)
- The Debut (2026)

Her films which have earned the most at the box office:

- The Hand That Rocks the Cradle (1992)
- The Fugitive (1993)
- Nine Months (1995)
- The Lost World: Jurassic Park (1997)
- Hannibal (2001)
- The Forgotten (2004)
- Crazy, Stupid, Love (2011)
- Non-Stop (2014)
- The Hunger Games: Mockingjay – Part 1 (2014)
- The Hunger Games: Mockingjay – Part 2 (2015)
- Kingsman: The Golden Circle (2017)

Moore has received five Academy Award nominations, nine Golden Globe nominations, seven SAG nominations, and four BAFTA nominations. From these, she has won an Academy Award, two Golden Globes, a BAFTA, and two SAG Awards; she has a Primetime Emmy and a Daytime Emmy. She has been named Best Actress at the Cannes Film Festival, Berlin International Film Festival, and the Venice Film Festival– and is the fourth person and second woman in history to achieve the feat. Her recognized roles came in As the World Turns, Boogie Nights, An Ideal Husband, The End of the Affair, Magnolia, Far From Heaven, The Hours, A Single Man, The Kids Are All Right, Game Change, Maps to the Stars, and Still Alice.

== Bibliography ==
- Moore, Julianne (2007). Freckleface Strawberry. Illustrated by LeUyen Pham. New York: Bloomsbury Juvenile US. ISBN 978-1599901077.
- Moore, Julianne (2009). Freckleface Strawberry And The Dodgeball Bully. Illustrated by LeUyen Pham. New York: Bloomsbury Juvenile US. ISBN 978-1599903163.
- Moore, Julianne (2011). Freckleface Strawberry Best Friends Forever. Illustrated by LeUyen Pham. New York: Bloomsbury Juvenile US. ISBN 978-1599907826.
- Moore, Julianne (2013). My Mom Is a Foreigner, But Not to Me. Illustrated by Meilo So. San Francisco: Chronicle Books. ISBN 978-1452107929.
- Moore, Julianne (2015). Freckleface Strawberry: Backpacks! (Step into Reading). Illustrated by LeUyen Pham. New York: Random House Books for Young Readers. ISBN 978-0385391948.
- Moore, Julianne (2015). Freckleface Strawberry: Lunch, or What's That? (Step into Reading). Illustrated by LeUyen Pham. New York: Random House Books for Young Readers. ISBN 978-0385391917.
- Moore, Julianne (2016). Freckleface Strawberry: Loose Tooth! (Step into Reading). Illustrated by LeUyen Pham. New York: Random House Books for Young Readers. ISBN 978-0385391979.
- Moore, Julianne (2016). Freckleface Strawberry and the Really Big Voice. Illustrated by LeUyen Pham. New York: Random House Books for Young Readers. ISBN 978-0385392037.
