= Maps to the Stars =

2014 satirical dark comedy film directed by David Cronenberg

- Theatrical release poster
- Directed by: David Cronenberg
- Written by: Bruce Wagner
- Produced by: Martin Katz; Saïd Ben Saïd; Michel Merkt
- Starring: Julianne Moore; Mia Wasikowska; Olivia Williams; Evan Bird; Sarah Gadon; John Cusack; Robert Pattinson
- Cinematography: Peter Suschitzky
- Edited by: Ronald Sanders
- Music by: Howard Shore
- Production companies: Prospero Pictures; SBS Productions
- Distributed by: Entertainment One Films (Canada); Le Pacte (France); MFA+ Filmdistribution (Germany); Focus World (US)
- Release dates: May 19, 2014 (Cannes); May 21, 2014 (France); October 31, 2014 (Canada); February 27, 2015 (United States)
- Running time: 112 minutes
- Countries: Canada; France; Germany; United States
- Language: English
- Budget: $13 million
- Box office: $4.5 million

Maps to the Stars is a 2014 satirical black comedy film directed by David Cronenberg, and starring Julianne Moore, Mia Wasikowska, John Cusack, Robert Pattinson, Olivia Williams, Sarah Gadon, and Evan Bird. The screenplay was written by Bruce Wagner, who had written a novel entitled Dead Stars based on the Maps to the Stars script, after initial plans for making the film with Cronenberg fell through.

This is the second consecutive collaboration between Cronenberg and Pattinson (after Cosmopolis) and marks the third collaboration between Cronenberg and Prospero Pictures, who previously collaborated on A Dangerous Method and Cosmopolis. This is also the third Cronenberg film made with Canadian actress Sarah Gadon. It is the first Cronenberg film shot partially in the United States, although most of it was shot, like his other films, in his native city of Toronto, Ontario, Canada.

The film concerns the plight of a child star and a washed-up actress while commenting on the entertainment industry's relationship with Western civilization as a whole. The film premiered in competition for the Palme d'Or at the 2014 Cannes Film Festival on May 19, 2014. Moore won the festival's Best Actress Award. Following its premiere at Cannes, the film had a theatrical release in France on May 21, 2014.

== Plot ==
Agatha Weiss arrives in Los Angeles from Florida and hires limousine driver Jerome to take her to the site of the former house of her brother Benjie. Agatha has severe burns to her face and body, requiring her to take a copious amount of medication, and is estranged from her parents, Stafford and Cristina Weiss. Benjie, a child star and recovering drug addict, visits a girl suffering from non-Hodgkin lymphoma in the hospital. The girl later dies, and Benjie is confronted by her ghost.

Stafford is a TV psychologist treating aging actress Havana Segrand for trauma from the psychological and sexual abuse she suffered at the hands of her deceased mother, legendary Hollywood star Clarice Taggart. Havana's agent Genie struggles to secure Havana a role in a remake of her mother's film Stolen Waters. Havana regularly suffers from vivid hallucinations of her mother, who taunts and verbally abuses her. At the suggestion of her friend Carrie Fisher, Havana hires Agatha, whom Carrie had met on Twitter, as a personal assistant. Agatha continues to see Jerome, and a romance forms. Stafford is distressed to learn from Havana that Agatha has returned to Los Angeles.

Genie informs Havana that another actress was cast in Stolen Waters, but when the actress's young son unexpectedly dies in an accident, Havana secures the part. Using Havana's role to gain access to the studio lot, Agatha visits Benjie on the set of Bad Babysitter 2, the comedy he is filming as his comeback following drug rehabilitation. Agatha tells him that she has returned from a sanatorium to make amends for setting the fire that burned her and nearly killed him when he was seven. Appalled to learn Agatha visited Benjie, Stafford finds her in her hotel room, gives her $10,000 and tells her to leave Los Angeles.

Benjie relapses, getting high on GHB and shooting his friend Rhett's dog. On set, he is haunted by the girl from the hospital and strangles his young co-star nearly to death during one of his hallucinations. The child survives, but Benjie loses his role in the film and is committed to a hospital. Agatha visits Cristina and reveals that before she set the fire she had discovered that her parents were brother and sister, making Agatha and Benjie children of incest. Cristina tells her they were separated as children and met by coincidence, starting a relationship before they knew of their relation. Stafford comes home, and when Agatha tells him she knows about their incest, he violently beats her until Cristina intervenes. During the altercation, Agatha steals Cristina's wedding ring.

Havana requests Jerome as a driver and seduces him in the backseat of his parked limo in the driveway of her home as Agatha watches from the window. Havana enters the house and berates Agatha for her poor performance at work. When Havana verbally humiliates Agatha for staining her couch with menstrual blood, Agatha beats Havana to death with one of her awards. Benjie escapes the hospital and comes to Havana's house to find Agatha. Agatha instructs Benjie to retrieve her father's ring.

Stafford returns home to see Cristina on fire outside beside the pool; he pushes her into the pool with a piece of furniture to save her, but she dies. Stafford goes into a catatonic state and does not resist when Benjie removes the ring from his finger. The siblings use their parents' rings in a wedding ritual they used to perform as children, then commit suicide using Agatha's medication.

Throughout the film, liberal quotations from Paul Éluard's poem "Liberté" meander "through each of the characters' lives," creating an underlying mantra for the film.

== Cast ==
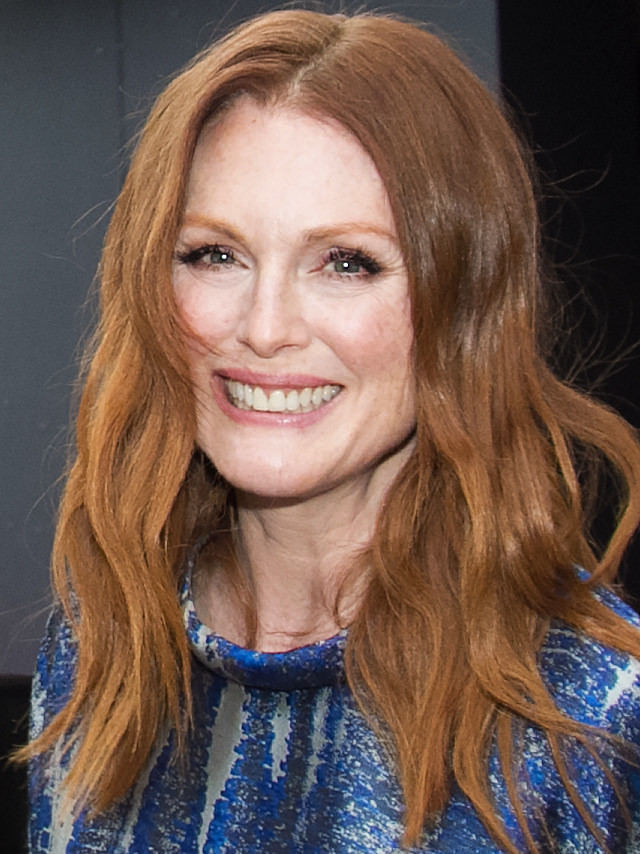
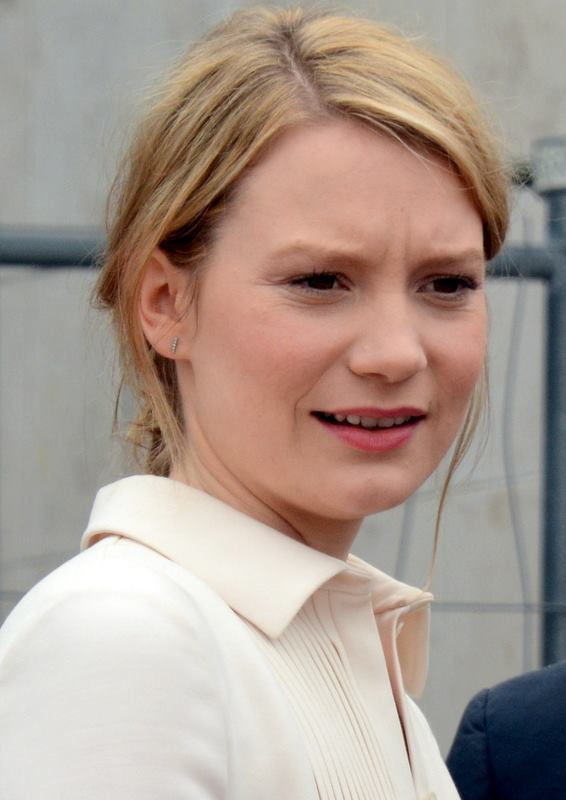
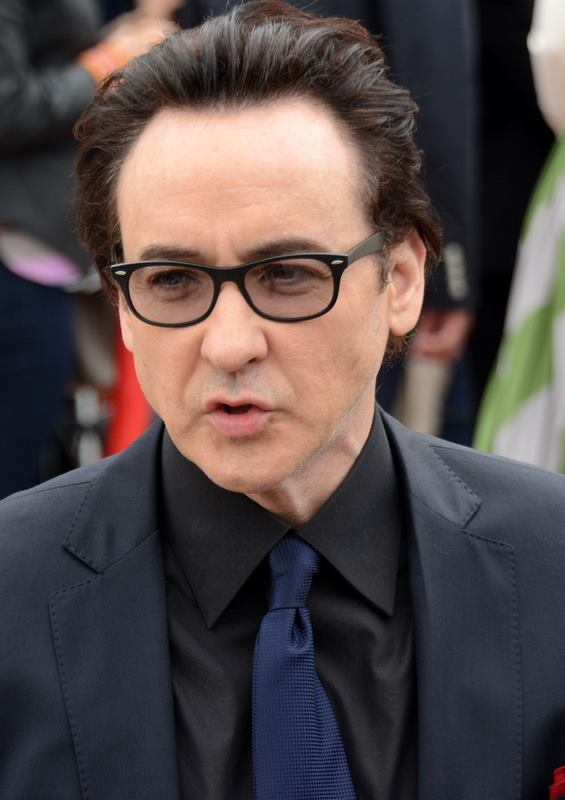
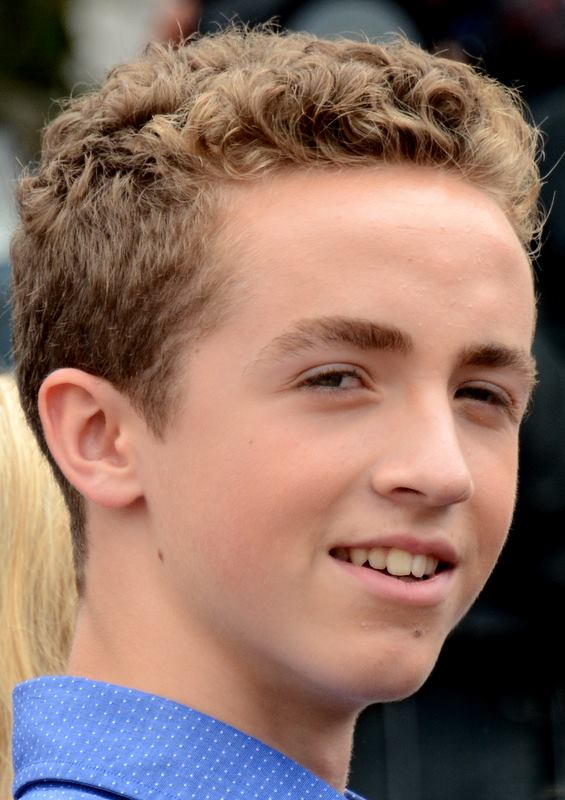
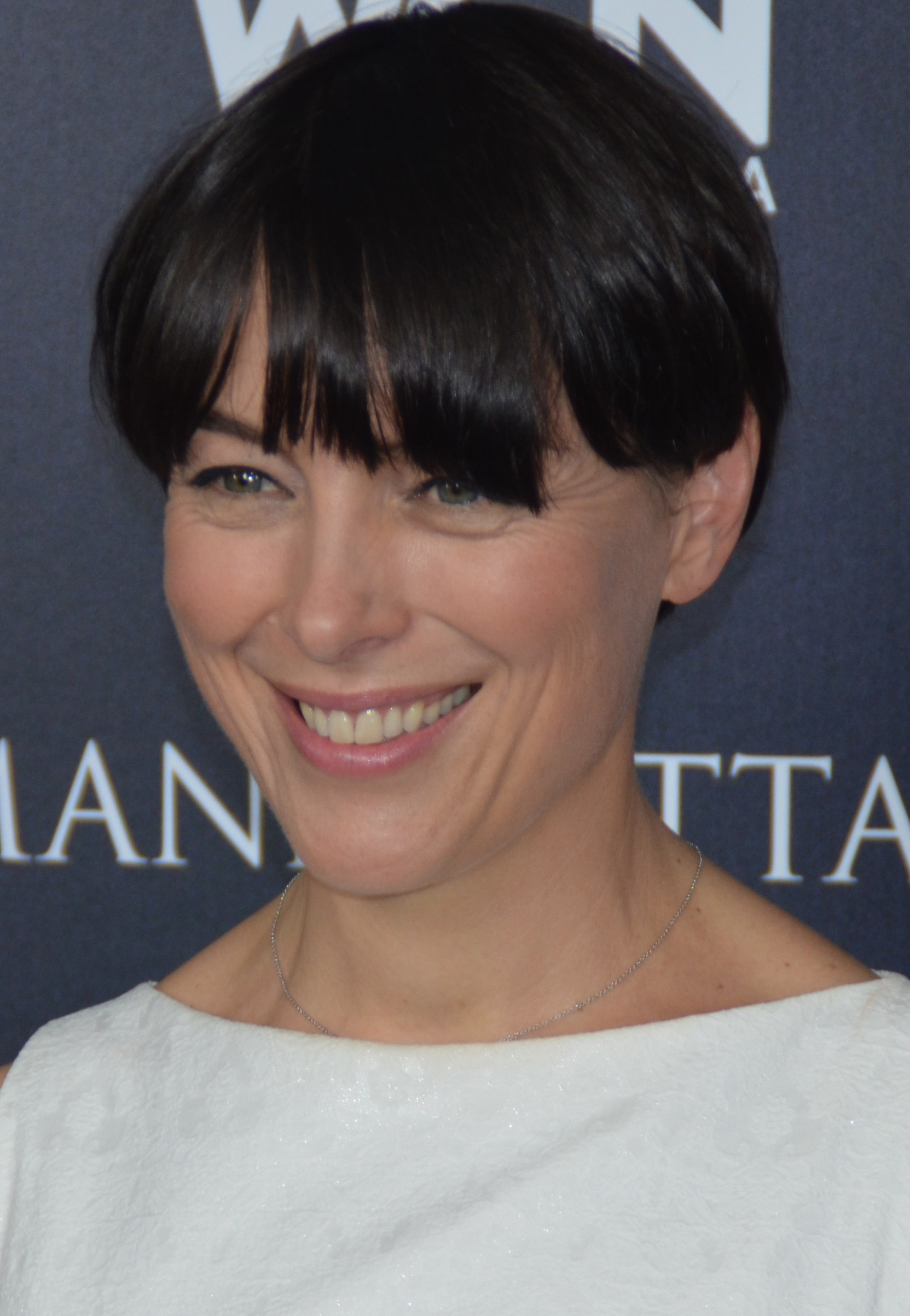
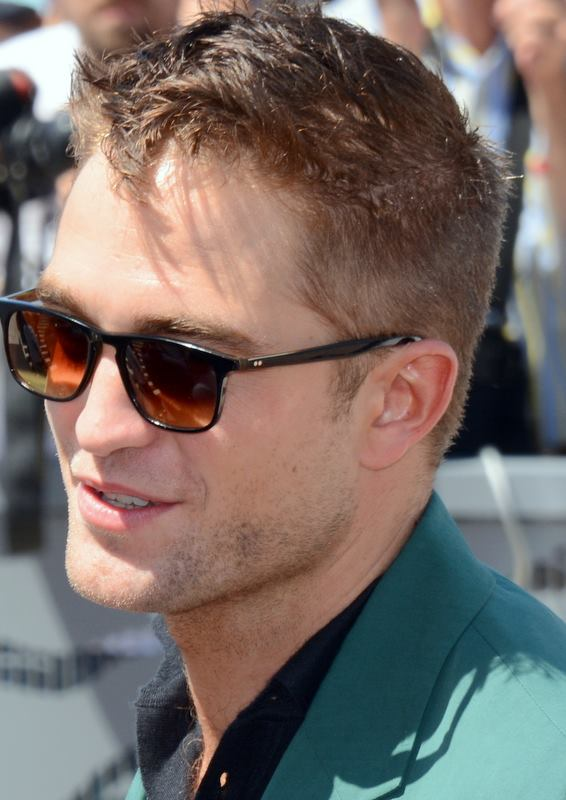
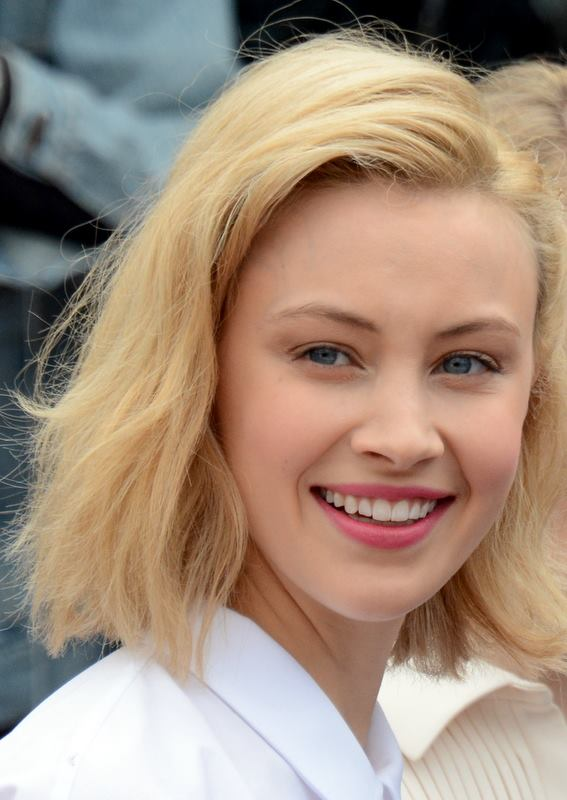
From top to bottom: Moore, Wasikowska, Cusack, Bird, Williams, Pattinson, and Gadon

Main cast

- Julianne Moore as Havana Segrand
  A famous but aging and fading actress living in the shadow of her legendary movie-star mother and feeling abused by her. Moore based the character on "an amalgam of people I've known and observed. She is someone who lives completely isolated in this make-believe world. She doesn't really have a family and she's still very angry with her mother because she feels she was abused. She's always lived in her mother's shadow, and in her mind, it's all a kind of mixed-up, Freudian mess."
- Mia Wasikowska as Agatha Weiss
  The scarred and estranged pyromaniac daughter of the Weiss family who takes a job as Havana's personal assistant, while waiting for the opportunity to make amends with her family. Wasikowska said, "I love Agatha because she's dark inside but at the same time in a lot of ways she has this very positive outlook. There's something very sweet and sad about this girl who, in the midst of these celebrity-obsessed parents, and this troubled past, really just wants to connect with them. They've totally rejected her, but in a way, she's desperately trying to mimic their lives. She's desperately trying to find her identity." She further added, "She has the gloves she wears over her burns, the facial scar, and all these rituals with the poem and the pills she takes, it's all very distinct to who she is."
- John Cusack as Stafford Weiss
  The head of the Weiss family, a TV psychologist with a number of high-profile celebrity clients, and immensely egoistic about the success of his son Benjie. Stafford exploits people's emotions and takes advantage of them. Stafford Weiss and his wife Cristina are brother and sister; they were separated at birth and discovered their relation after meeting in college and becoming a couple. According to Cusack, "He sees himself as a healer. He's part Tony Robbins, part Reiki Master, part shrink. But his son is the real star—he's a massive teen star of Bieberesque proportions." Describing the script he said, "It was the most savage destruction of Hollywood fame and secrets and that whole toxic brew that I'd ever seen."
- Evan Bird as Benjie Weiss
  A child actor sensation and controversial star who is trying to get his career on track after his stint at rehab while simultaneously battling demons from his past. Cronenberg was not sure that any child actor could play Benjie's character successfully until he saw Bird in the TV series The Killing. Bird said about his character, "[H]e doesn't really have love and yet he doesn't really have limitations, either. So he's searching for both of those things. He's making way too much money, he's being taken advantage of by his parents, and he's really screwed up."
- Olivia Williams as Cristina Weiss
  Ambitious and controlling, she manages the career of her son. Cristina Weiss and her husband Stafford are sister and brother; they were separated at birth and discovered their relation after meeting in college and becoming a couple. According to Williams, "She is a very ambitious woman and we get to see her downfall from the very heights of her power. She operates in a world where someone could be the nastiest person on earth and make your life hell, but you might still want them in your movie because they'll make you money."
- Robert Pattinson as Jerome Fontana
  A limousine driver and struggling actor who wants to be a successful screenwriter. Jerome is inspired by Bruce Wagner, who, at the time when he conceived the idea for this story, was himself a struggling actor and writer working as a limo driver. Pattinson described the character as most sane and ordinary but like every LA dreamer in the story and said, "Jerome would never accept that he is just a limo driver. I think he feels he's just waiting for his break. And yet, he's seemingly the only one in this story who's not going insane—or who isn't a ghost." And about the script he added that "It's really about people who lie to themselves—right up until the end."
- Sarah Gadon as Clarice Taggart
  An iconic Hollywood movie star who died in a fire and appears as a twenty-something-year-old ghost to her daughter Havana. Cronenberg said that "it's such a lovely, unusual role, because she's simply this ghostly memory." Gadon said, "I really want to do the film because I thought it was a critique about contemporary Hollywood. And, specifically, of a woman's place in Hollywood."

Other cast

- Kiara Glasco as Cammy
  A girl who died young and appears as a ghost to Benjie because he visited her in the hospital before her death with the intentions of making a film on her life, and used his visit as a publicity stunt.
- Dawn Greenhalgh as Genie
  Havana's agent who assists her in landing the role in the remake of Clarice's film.
- Jonathan Watton as Sterl Carruth
  A film actor and friend of Havana.
- Jennifer Gibson as Starla Gent
  A country singer and friend of Sterl.
- Gord Rand as Damien Javitz
  A rising talented director of the remake of Stolen Waters, and described as "He's no P. T. Anderson, but he resurrects actors."
- Justin Kelly as Rhett
  A young Hollywood actor and friend of Benjie.
- Niamh Wilson as Sam
  A girl who's in Benjie and Rhett's circle of friends.
- Clara Pasieka as Gretchen Voss
  A young Hollywood actress and friend of Rhett.
- Emilia McCarthy as Kayla
  A young Hollywood actress and friend of Benjie.
- Allegra Fulton as Harriet
  Benjie's therapist.
- Domenic Ricci as Micah
  Azita's young son who died in a tragic accident.
- Jayne Heitmeyer as Azita Wachtel
  An actress and Havana's rival for the coveted role in the remake of Clarice's 1960 movie Stolen Waters.
- Sean Robertson as Roy
  A four-year-old costar of Benjie, whom Benjie perceives as competition and injures him during his hallucination believing him to be Cammy.
- Ari Cohen as Jeb Berg
  A Hollywood producer working on the sequel of Benjie's blockbuster film, a fictitious teen comedy titled "Bad Babysitter".
- Carrie Fisher as herself
  Fisher has a cameo appearance in the film. Agatha Weiss befriended her on Twitter to write a novel and on her recommendation Havana hired Agatha as her new personal assistant.

== Production ==
=== Development ===
Hollywood is a world that is seductive and repellent at the same time, and it is the combination of the two that makes it so potent.

— David Cronenberg, director of Maps to the Stars, on the film.

Plans for the film hit financial difficulties and it was in development for around six years. During promotion of Cosmopolis in May 2012, at Cannes, David Cronenberg said that "It's not a 'go' picture. We have a script that I love that Bruce wrote; it's a very difficult film to get made as was Cosmopolis actually. Whether I can get this movie to happen, I tried it five years ago, I couldn't get it made, so I still might not be able to get it made." He also added that "Maps to the Stars is very extreme. It's not obviously a very big commercial movie, and even as an independent film it's difficult. Maps to the Stars is completely different [from Cosmopolis], but it's very acerbic and satirical; it's a hard sell."

Talking about the script, Cronenberg revealed that "It's kind of a satire on Hollywood. It's very typical of Bruce Wagner's writing. And it's sort of a condensed essence of Bruce. And while it's satirical, it's also very powerful, emotionally, and insightful and funny. You could say it's a Hollywood film because the characters are agents, actors and managers, but it is not a satire like The Player." Producer Martin Katz described it as an "absurdist comedy about the entertainment business."

=== Casting ===
Viggo Mortensen and Rachel Weisz were initially cast but left due to scheduling difficulties, and were later replaced by Cusack and Moore. Moore bleached her hair blonde for the part of Havana, and said in an interview about the film that, "It's not only about celebrity culture, but the pursuit of fame at any cost." It is the second collaboration between Pattinson and Cronenberg after Cosmopolis.

=== Pre-production ===
Production began in July 2013. Cronenberg stated that "it would be the first time I've ever shot a foot of film in the United States. It's strange, just because of the way the co-production deals work, that even though I've had movies that are set in the U.S. like Cosmopolis or The Dead Zone, I've never shot in the United States. This would be the first time. And I'm really excited about it." He further added that "Well, Maps to the Stars is an L.A. story and I really felt that is something I could not create on a set in Toronto, whereas the structure of Cosmopolis allows me to create New York on a soundstage in Toronto.

=== Filming ===
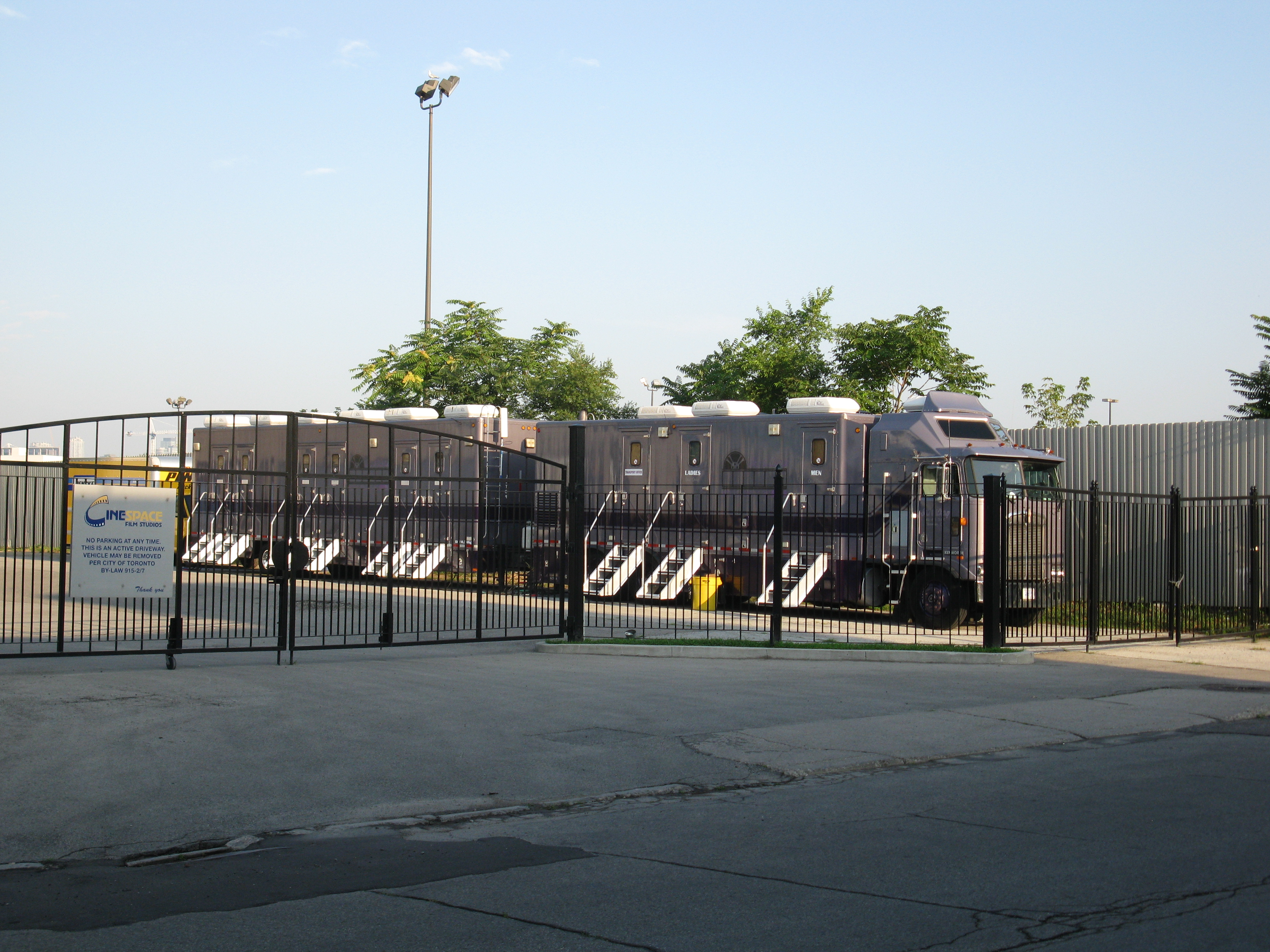
Interior locations were filmed at Cinespace film studio of Toronto.

Principal photography began on July 8, 2013, in Toronto, Ontario, Canada and continued until August 12, 2013. Most of the shooting took place in Toronto and many of the interior locations in the film were filmed at the Eastern Avenue site of Cinespace Studios. On July 19, some scenes were shot in and around the diner at Queen street in Leslieville, Ontario.

Filming then moved to Los Angeles, California. Most of the shoot was outdoors, at some landmark sites. On August 17, filming took place downtown at Union Station, Los Angeles with Pattinson and Wasikowska and on August 18 and 19, scenes were shot at Rodeo Drive and The Beverly Hilton in Beverly Hills, L.A. Scenes were also filmed at the Hollywood Walk of Fame, Hollywood Boulevard and Runyon Canyon near Mulholland Drive on August 20 and at Park Way Beverly Hills L.A. on August 21. Cronenberg lit the Hollywood Sign for a scene on August 20, by using 4K HMI lights. He has said that "It's no different than shining a light from a helicopter." Filming wrapped up on August 22, 2013, in L.A.

== Music ==
Howard Shore composed the score for the film. He has collaborated with Cronenberg on all but one of his films since 1979. The album was released by Howe Records on September 9, 2014. The first single featuring a track from the soundtrack album was released on May 21, 2014.

== Distribution ==
=== Marketing and promotion ===
On April 14, 2014, the first preview trailer was released for sales and distribution. It was followed by the full-length official trailer of the film next day. The same month with the announcement of the film's premieres at the Cannes Film Festival, two images of Julianne Moore, Mia Wasikowska and Robert Pattinson from the film were released. EOne revealed another trailer for the film on September 10, 2014, ahead of film's release in Spain and Canada.

=== Releases ===
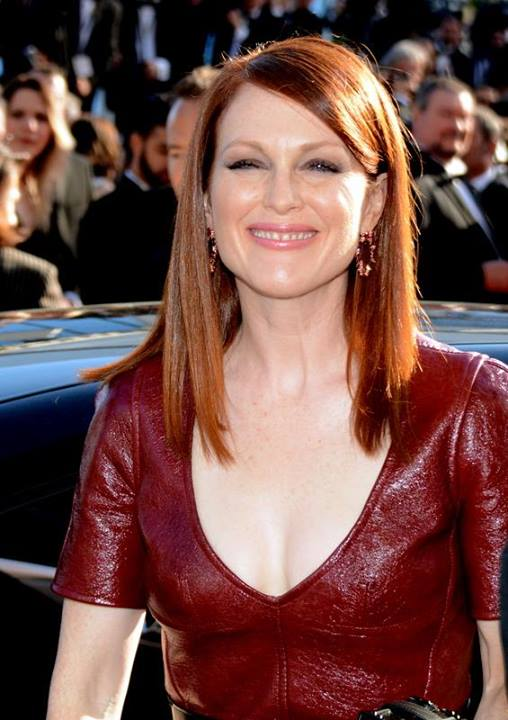
Julianne Moore promoting the film at the Cannes Film Festival.

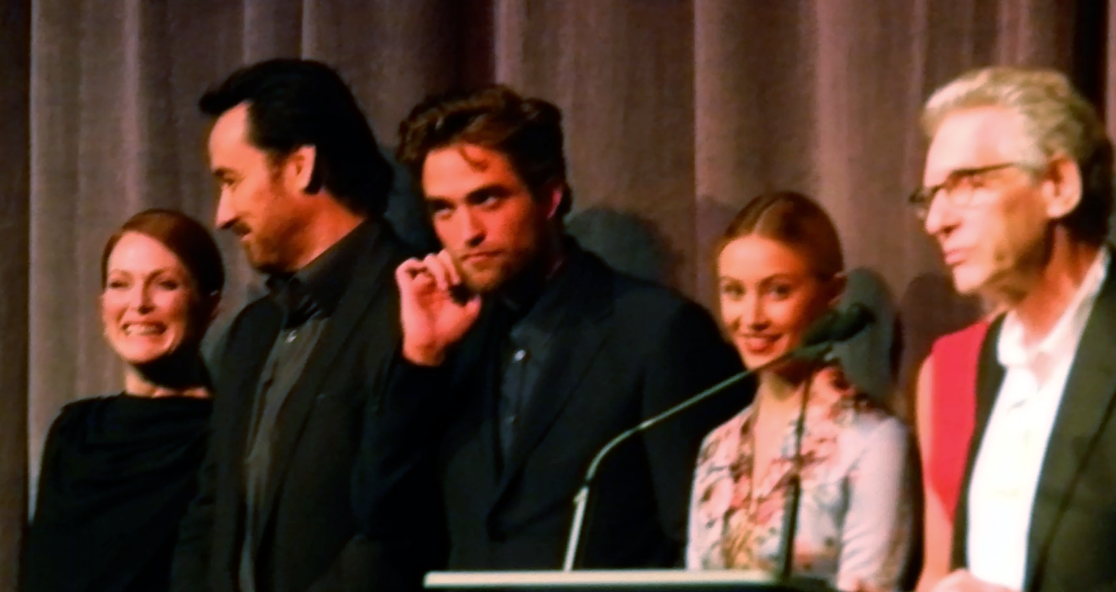
From left to right: Moore, Cusack, Pattinson, Gadon and Cronenberg at the screening of film at 2014 Toronto International Film Festival.

The film screened at 2014 New Zealand International Film Festival in the Legends section on July 25, 2014. It screened in the Gala Presentations section of the 2014 Toronto International Film Festival on September 9, 2014 and also screened at the 2014 New York Film Festival on September 27, 2014. It was released in UK on September 26, 2014. It served as the closing film at the 2014 Tokyo International Film Festival on October 31, 2014, and was theatrically released in Canada on the same day. On November 8, 2014, it screened at Stockholm International Film Festival. It was released in Australia on November 20, 2014.

In September 2014, Focus World acquired the United States distribution rights of the film and gave the film an award-qualifying limited release in L.A. from December 5 to 11, 2014, before its day-and-date release on February 27, 2015.

=== Home media ===
The film was released on DVD and Blu-ray in France on September 24, 2014. It was available on DVD in UK on November 24, 2014 and was released on March 3, 2015, in Germany. Universal Pictures Home Entertainment released the DVD and Blu-ray Disc of the film in United States on April 14, 2015.

== Reception ==
=== Box office ===
The film had a limited release in France in May 2014, and then released in different countries and has grossed worldwide total of $4 million.

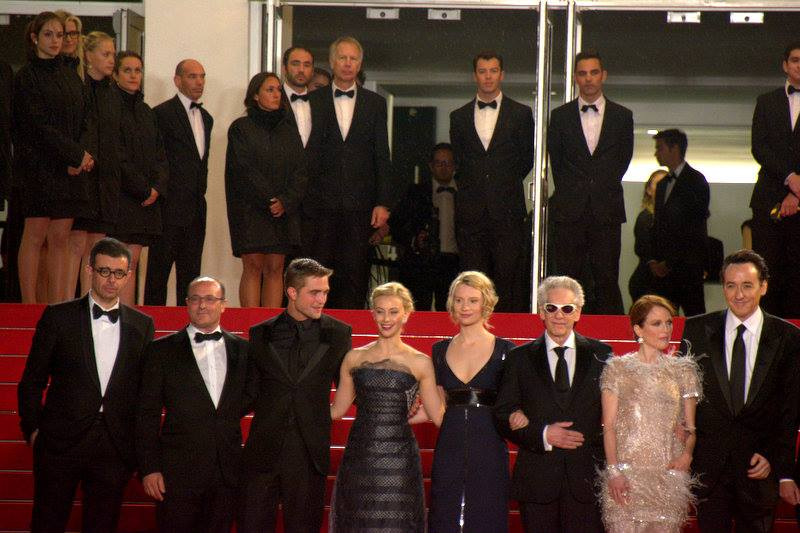
Map to the Stars premiere at 2014 Cannes Film Festival; use cursor to identify the people.

=== Critical response ===
The film received mostly positive reviews, and performances from the cast were praised. Review aggregator Rotten Tomatoes reports that 62% of 162 critics have given the film a positive review, with a rating average of 6.6/10. The site's summary states: "Narratively unwieldy and tonally jumbled, Maps to the Stars still has enough bite to satisfy David Cronenberg fans in need of a coolly acidic fix." On Metacritic, which assigns a weighted mean rating out of 100 reviews from film critics, the films holds an average score of 68, based on 39 reviews, indicating "generally favorable reviews".

Dave Calhoun of Time Out stated that "This creepy portrait of Beverly Hills screw-ups is deeply silly, but it has just enough venomous bite." The Daily Telegraph's Robbie Collin gave the film five stars out of five and wrote that it "takes place in a kind of pharmaceutically heightened hyper-reality of its own: it's not so much a twisted dream of making it in show-business, as a writhing, hissing, Hollywood waking nightmare." He said that "Moore, in particular, is tremendous" and concluded that "Cronenberg has made a film that you want to unsee – and then see and unsee again." Oliver Lyttelton, in his review for The Playlist, graded the film B+ by saying that "The film is a sickly enjoyable wallow in the scandalous, fucked-up side of showbusiness, and a real return to form for the filmmaker." Peter Bradshaw of The Guardian gave the film four out of five stars and called the film "A gripping and exquisitely horrible movie about contemporary Hollywood – positively vivisectional in its sadism and scorn." Mark Kermode, also of The Guardian, compared the film to "Sunset Boulevard, with sprinklings of Chinatown, Beyond the Valley of the Dolls and Mommie Dearest thrown in for good measure." He called Moore "magnificently horrendous" with Wasikowska "provid[ing] ice-cool counterpoint", Williams "terrific" and Pattinson "nicely underplayed". In his review for Slant Magazine, Budd Wilkins compared the film to David Lynch's Mulholland Drive (2001): "Maps to the Stars is a scabrous, etched-in-acid comedy that digs deeper into the perversions and pathologies undergirding the Dream Factory than anything since Mulholland Drive."

However, Peter Debruge of Variety criticized the film as "part showbiz sendup, part ghost story, part dysfunctional-family drama, [it] instead comes across as so much jaded mumbo-jumbo." Todd McCarthy of The Hollywood Reporter thought that the film "comes off like a prank more than a coherent take on 21st century Hollywood, even if there are crumbs of truth and wit scattered throughout it." Lee Marshall of Screen International said that "The film doesn't quite get away with its attempt to reconcile satire with pathos, but it comes perilously close."

The film was included in the list of "Canada's Top Ten" feature films of 2014, selected by a panel of filmmakers and industry professionals organized by TIFF.

In 2023, Barry Hertz of The Globe and Mail named the film as one of the 23 best Canadian comedy films ever made.

=== Accolades ===
Year	Group/Award	Category	Recipient	Result	Ref.
2015	Canadian Screen Awards	Best Motion Picture	Saïd Ben Saïd, Martin Katz, and Michel Merkt	Nominated	
2015	Canadian Screen Awards	Best Direction	David Cronenberg	Nominated	
2015	Canadian Screen Awards	Best Actor in a Leading Role	Evan Bird	Nominated	
2015	Canadian Screen Awards	Best Actress in a Leading Role	Julianne Moore	Nominated	
2015	Canadian Screen Awards	Best Actor in a Supporting Role	John Cusack	Won	
2015	Canadian Screen Awards	Best Actor in a Supporting Role	Robert Pattinson	Nominated	
2015	Canadian Screen Awards	Best Actress in a Supporting Role	Mia Wasikowska	Nominated	
2015	Canadian Screen Awards	Best Original Screenplay	Bruce Wagner	Nominated	
2015	Canadian Screen Awards	Best Editing	Ronald Sanders	Nominated	
2015	Canadian Screen Awards	Best Overall Sound	Christian Cooke, Michael O'Farrell, and Orest Sushko	Nominated	
2015	Canadian Screen Awards	Best Achievement in Music: Original Score	Howard Shore	Won	
2014	Cannes Film Festival	Palme d'Or	David Cronenberg	Nominated	
2014	Cannes Film Festival	Best Actress	Julianne Moore	Won	
2014	Cannes Film Festival	Cannes Soundtrack Award	Howard Shore	Won	
2015	Canadian Society of Cinematographers Awards	Best Theatrical Feature Cinematography	Peter Suschitzky	Nominated	
2015	Directors Guild of Canada	Best Production Design	Carol Spier	Won	
2015	Directors Guild of Canada	Best Picture Editing	Ronald Sanders	Nominated	
2015	Directors Guild of Canada	Best Sound Editing	Michael O'Farrell, Robert Bertola, Wayne Griffin, Alastair Gray and Gren-Erich Zwicker	Nominated	
2014	Golden Globe Awards	Best Actress in a Motion Picture – Comedy or Musical	Julianne Moore	Nominated	
2014	International Cinephile Society Awards	Best Supporting Actress	Julianne Moore	Won	
2015	London Film Critics' Circle Awards	Actress of the year (also for Still Alice)	Julianne Moore	Nominated	
2014	Sitges Film Festival	Best Actress	Julianne Moore	Won	
