= Hadley (name) =

- Pronunciation: /ˈhædli/
- Gender: Unisex
- Language: English

Origin
- Language: Old English
- Origin: Hadley (surname)
- Meaning: “field of heather”
- Region of origin: England

Other names
- Variant forms: Hadleigh; Hadlee
- Related names: Hedley, Headley

Hadley is a both a surname and a given name that is a transferred use of a place name of English origin that means “heather field.” The name has increased in popularity in recent years for girls in the United States and has ranked among the top 200 names used for American girls since 2011. Spelling variants such as Hadlee and Hadleigh are also in wide use.

Notable people with the name include:

== Surname ==
- Arthur Twining Hadley (1856–1930), American economist
- Arthur Hadley (footballer) (1876–1963), English footballer
- Bert Hadley (1882–1968), American actor
- Byera Hadley (1872–1937), Australian architect and educator
- David Hadley (born 1964), American businessman and former politician
- Della Hadley (1929–2026), American politician
- DeSean Hadley (born 1977), American basketball player
- George Hadley (1685–1768) meteorologist
- George Hadley (footballer) (1893–1963), half-back for Southampton, Aston Villa, and Coventry City
- Hap Hadley (1895–1976), American artist
- Harry Hadley (1877–1942), England international footballer
- Henry Hadley (died 1914), "first British casualty" of World War I
- Henry Kimball Hadley (1871–1937), US composer
- Herbert S. Hadley (1872–1927), Governor of Missouri
- Hiram E. Hadley (1854–1929), justice of the Washington Supreme Court
- Jack Hadley, museum curator
- Jackson Hadley, American businessman and politician
- Jerry Hadley (1952–2007), American opera tenor
- Joe Hadley, American boxer
- John Hadley (disambiguation), multiple people
- Joshua Hadley, Republic of Texas politician
- Leila Hadley, American travel writer
- Len Hadley, American businessman
- Lindley H. Hadley (1861–1948), U.S. Representative from Washington
- Marian M. Hadley, librarian
- Patrick Hadley, British composer
- Paul Hadley, designer of the flag of Indiana, U.S.
- Paige Hadley, Australian netball player
- Ray Hadley, Australian radio broadcaster
- Richard Hadlee, New Zealand cricketer
- Ron Hadley (born 1963), American football player
- Ryan Hadley, Australian cricketer
- Stephen Hadley, United States National Security Advisor
- Thomas Jefferson Hadley, American Revolutionary war captain
- Tony Hadley, British pop singer and lead voice of Spandau Ballet during the 1980s
- William M. Hadley, American educator

== Given name ==
- Hadley Arkes (born 1940), American political scientist
- Hadley Castille (1933–2012), Musical artist
- Hadley Cantril (1906–1969), American psychologist
- Hadley Caliman (1932–2010), American jazz saxophone and flute player
- Hadley Delany, American actress
- Hadley Duvall, American reproductive freedom advocate
- Hadley Fraser (born 1980), British theatre actor
- Hadley Freeman (born 1978), UK fashion journalist
- Hadley Foster (born 1975), American athletic administrator
- Hadley Gamble, American television journalist
- Hadley Hartmetz (born 2001), American professional ice hockey player
- Hadley Hesus, Palauan politician
- Hadley Hinds (1946–2023), Barbadian sprinter
- Hadley Hicks (1933–2016), American sports coach and author
- Hadley Husisian (born 2003), American épée fencer
- Hadley Kay (born 1972/1973), Canadian actor
- Hadley Luddy, American politician
- Hadley Belle Miller, American actress
- Hadley Richardson (1891–1979), first wife of Ernest Hemingway, grandmother to Margaux and Mariel Hemingway
- Hadley Robinson (born 1995), American actress
- Hadley Tonga (born 2005), Australian rugby player
- Hadley Brown Tremain (1874–1951), Canadian politician
- Hadley Wickham (born 1979), data scientist and software developer
- Hadley Williams (1864–1932), Canadian surgeon

== Fictional characters ==
- Byron Hadley, character in the novella Rita Hayworth and Shawshank Redemption and its film adaptation The Shawshank Redemption
- Remy "Thirteen" Hadley, character in the TV series House
