= Hadley =

Hadley may refer to:

== Places ==
=== Earth ===
==== Canada ====
- Hadley Bay, on the north of Victoria Island, Nunavut

==== England ====
- Hadley, London, a former civil parish within Barnet Urban District from 1894 to 1965
- Hadley, Shropshire, part of the new town of Telford, Shropshire
- Hadley Wood in the London Borough of Enfield
- Monken Hadley, suburb of Barnet, in the London Borough of Barnet

==== United States ====
- Hadley Township, Pike County, Illinois
- Hadley, Indiana
- Hadley, Kentucky
- Hadley, Massachusetts
  - South Hadley, Massachusetts
- Hadley Township, Michigan
  - Hadley, Michigan, an unincorporated community
- Hadley, Minnesota
- Hadley, Missouri
- Hadley, Nevada
- Hadley's Purchase, New Hampshire, an uninhabited township of Coos County
- Hadley, New York, town in Saratoga County
  - Hadley (CDP), New York, the main hamlet in the town
- Hadley, Pennsylvania, a place in Mercer County
- Branchland, West Virginia, an unincorporated community in West Virginia also known as Hadley

=== Other celestial bodies ===
- Hadley (crater), a crater on Mars
- Hadley–Apennine, a region on the Moon and landing site for NASA's Apollo 15 mission
- Mons Hadley, a mount on the Moon

== Other ==
- Hadley (name), an English surname and given name
- Hadley (non-profit organization) for visually impaired adults in Winnetka, Illinois
- Hadley!, a 2010 Australian TV talk show hosted by Ray Hadley
- Hadley cell, a tropical atmospheric circulation
- Hadley Centre for Climate Prediction and Research in Exeter, England
- Hadley engine, a liquid rocket engine designed by Ursa Major Technologies
- Hadley F.C., an association football club from Barnet, England
- Hadley Junior High School, in Glen Ellyn, Illinois
- Hadley Pottery, an American pottery and stoneware company

== See also ==
- Hadley House (disambiguation)
- Hadley Township (disambiguation)
- Hadlee, a surname
- Hadleigh (disambiguation)
- Headley (disambiguation)
- Hedley (disambiguation)
