= Hedley =

Hedley may refer to:

- Hedley, British Columbia, Canada, an unincorporated town
- Hedley, Texas, United States, a city
- Hedley railway station, South Gippsland, Victoria, Australia
- Hedley (band), a Canadian pop-rock band formed in 2003 and named after the BC town
  - Hedley (album), their self-titled debut album
- Hedley (surname), a list of people and fictional characters
- Hedley (given name), a list of people and fictional characters

== See also ==
- Hedley on the Hill, Northumberland, in Hedley civil parish
- Hedley Hill, county Durham
- Hadleigh (disambiguation)
- Hadley (disambiguation)
- Headley (disambiguation)
