= Ladley =

Ladley is a surname. Notable people with the surname include:

- Matt Ladley (born 1991), American snowboarder

== See also ==
- Adley
- Hadley (name)
