= John Hedley =

John Hedley may refer to:

- John Hedley (bishop), British Benedictine and writer
- John Herbert Hedley, World War I flying ace dubbed "The Luckiest Man Alive"
- John Prescott Hedley, British physician

== See also ==
- Jack Hedley (disambiguation)
