= The Hidden Persuaders (film) =

- Directed by: Wayne Dudley
- Produced by: Wayne Dudley
- Starring: Dayle Teegarden; Nicolas Modlin; Stephen Samson; Siobhan Callas; Rez Kempton
- Production company: Dudley Dangerous Productions
- Release date: 5 November 2011 (United States)
- Running time: 124 minutes
- Country: United Kingdom
- Language: English

The Hidden Persuaders is a 2011 British mystery film written and directed by Wayne Dudley, and released by Dudley Dangerous Productions. It stars Dayle Teegarden as "Frank Cash", a reporter from the Daily Tribune; Nicky Modlin as "Damon DeVille", the lead singer of the band Processed Minds; and Stephen Samson as "Dave McCartney", the band's manager

The film tells the story of Cash as he attempts to uncover the death of controversial rock star Damon Deville, the lead singer of the band Processed Minds. He teams up with junior reporter Summer Stevens, who is played by Siobhan Callas, to uncover the truth.

Development of The Hidden Persuaders began when director Wayne Dudley was still studying at Abertay University. The Hidden Persuaders was filmed during the summer of 2010. The Hidden Persuaders was first screened 7 January 2011 in Dundee, Scotland then screened at New York's Big Mini-DV Festival in the United States, where it won the award for Best Experimental Film.

The film was written, produced, directed and edited by Wayne Dudley and was filmed entirely in Dundee.

Inspired by film maker Robert Rodriquez, who made El Mariachi in 1992 on his own for $7,000, Wayne decided the only way to succeed in such a competitive industry was to make a feature film on his own with little or no budget.

== Plot ==
The lead singer of controversial rock band Processed Minds, has been found dead, apparently electrocuted by his own guitar. Written off as a drug-fuelled accident, the police are looking at an open and shut case. However, a curious reporter's instincts are proven right when a heated conversation reveals more questions than answers. Frank Cash must now use all of his experience to find out the truth as he delves deeper into a world of corruption, murder, sex, drugs and rock & roll.

== Cast ==
- Dayle Teegarden as Frank Cash, a reporter for the Daily Tribune
- Nicky Modlin as Damon DeVille, the lead singer of the band Processed Minds
- Stephen Samson as Dave McCartney, the band's manager
- Siobhan Callas as Summer Stevens, a junior reporter at the Daily Tribune
- Rez Kempton as Eric Simmons
- Tim Seyfert as Swift, bass player for the band Processed Minds
- James Michael Rankin as Jim, a police officer
- Christian Zanone as The Governor
- Annie Minnaar as the drummer

The cast contains nearly 60 actors from all over the UK as well as a couple from America with the lead character, Frank Cash, played by former Los Angeles actor Dayle Teegarden, who has previous experience working on television series such as 24, CSI: Miami, ER and River City as well as feature films such as The Longest Yard, Doomsday and M.I.5.

The casting was still in process during filming due to a number of cancellations at very short notice and one small role was filled by a girl passerby. Wayne recalls "We were waiting for the owner of Dundee Music Studios to arrive to let us into the premises and we had exhausted our options trying to find a last minute replacement to play a secretary, as the previous actor had cancelled only the night before. Luckily a young attractive woman who fitted the bill passed us by on her way to work and we approached her to fill the role. She agreed but stated she only had a one-hour lunch break. We therefore agreed to pick her up in the town centre, drive her to the location on the Perth Road, film her scenes and return her to work. Luckily we made it with two minutes to spare." He believes, however, that this is all part of being a low-budget filmmaker. "If you let incidents like this trouble you then you will never succeed in making your movie. You have to simply respond quickly to any obstacle you face and try your best to resolve the problem. It’s all part of the fun."

Rest of cast

- Chris Butler as Peter Reid
- Robert J. Goodwin as George
- Callum Mitchell as Conference Manager
- Steven Wall as Barman
- Dana Beaton as Chinese Server
- Sandy Jack as Jury Member
- Tara McConnell as Jury Member
- Glynis Wozniak as Jeane
- Carolyn Murray as Mrs. Johnson
- Lesley Sim as News Reporter
- Keith Tomlin as Prison Guard

== Production ==
Wayne Dudley's debut feature film was made entirely in Dundee, essentially by a crew of one and cost only £230 to make.

Despite its low budget, The Hidden Persuaders won Best Experimental Film at the Big Mini-DV Festival in New York.

Wayne spent a month filming the movie (July 2010) before, as he admits, the hard work began.

The next four months were spent exhaustively on his laptop, working ten hours a day creating a rough edit of the film, editing the sound, colour correcting the footage, selecting and negotiating the sound track, creating the credits and cutting the film's trailer.

He then headed off on a two-month trek to London, Los Angeles and Vancouver, armed with copies of the movie in an attempt to secure a distribution deal for the film and future work in the industry.
