= Arthur Hadley =

Arthur Hadley may refer to:

- Arthur Twining Hadley (1856–1930), economist and president of Yale University
- Arthur Hadley (footballer) (1876–1963), English footballer
