= Edley =

Edley is an English surname. Notable people with the surname include:

- Bill Edley (born 1948), American businessman and politician
- Christopher Edley Jr. (born 1953), American law school dean
- Joe Edley (born 1947), American professional Scrabble player and author

Edley is reasonably common in uk Especially in the midlands and north

== See also ==
- Hedley (surname)
