= David Phillips (entrepreneur) =

American civil engineer

David Phillips is an American civil engineer who accumulated frequent-flyer miles by taking advantage of a promotion by Healthy Choice Foods in 1999. While grocery shopping, he calculated that the value of a mail-in promotion for frequent-flyer miles exceeded the cost of the pudding on which it was offered. In May 1999, Phillips received 1,253,000 frequent flyer miles.

Phillips is the associate vice president of energy and sustainability at University of California.

== Process ==
Healthy Choice was running a promotion offering 500 miles for each pack of 10 Healthy Choice bar codes (UPC) mailed in as proof of purchase. Valuing each mile at two cents, Phillips calculated the return per UPC ($1) was worth a significant part of the price of a frozen meal (which were selling for $2), but while shopping he found Healthy Choice soup cans for only $0.90.

He later discovered the same promotion also included individual pudding packages at 25 cents each, while shopping at a nearby Grocery Outlet. He subsequently visited 10 Grocery Outlet stores in the Sacramento area, buying every case of pudding available, totaling 12,150 individual servings of pudding, for $3,140. He also had the Grocery Outlet manager order additional cases. To divert attention, he claimed he was stocking up for Y2K. Clerks started calling him "Pudding Guy".

The promotion included an early-bird bonus if the packages were mailed during May 1999 (the mileage earned would double from 500 miles to 1,000 miles for every 10 UPCs submitted). Unable to remove all the UPCs himself in such a short time, Phillips recruited members of a local Salvation Army branch to cut the UPC codes off the cardboard wrapped around the pudding containers; in exchange, he donated the individual puddings. This donation allowed him to receive $815 in tax write-offs, further increasing his return on investment.

== Outcome ==
Phillips submitted proof of mailing the certificates and Healthy Choice Foods awarded him 1,253,000 frequent-flyer miles. He applied some of the miles to his United, Delta, and Northwest frequent flyer accounts, and the majority (over 1 million miles) to his AAdvantage account, earning himself lifetime Gold status.

It is also speculated that neither ConAgra, the owner of the Healthy Choice brand, nor the airlines were seriously disadvantaged by the outcome, due to the small price paid by ConAgra to the airlines and the resultant publicity gained.

Since 2000, Phillips continued to take advantage of frequent-flyer promotions, and has earned points five times faster than he is spending them, now having reached lifetime Platinum status on his AAdvantage account. By 2016, he had traveled to 43 different countries.

Phillips' pudding story received international attention from news outlets, such as The Wall Street Journal and The Times. The story was the inspiration for a subplot in the 2002 film Punch-Drunk Love.

== See also ==
- AAirpass
- Hoover free flights promotion in Britain in the early 1990s, whereby flights to the United States were offered for purchasing lower-priced appliances.
