= Mary Alice Hadley =

American potter and businesswoman

- Born: Mary Alice Hale; October 5, 1911; Terre Haute, Indiana
- Died: December 26, 1965 (aged 54); Louisville, Kentucky
- Education: Indiana State University; Depauw University
- Known for: Ceramics

Mary Alice Hadley (née Hadley; October 5, 1911 – December 26, 1965) was an American artist from Terre Haute, Indiana, known for her earthenware pottery pieces with hand-painted images of farm and coastal life, which were sold by Hadley Pottery.

== Early life and education ==
Mary Alice Hadley's parents were Frank R. and Hattie Alice Hale. Her father founded the Vigo American Clay Company which made construction tile, and was once one of the largest building tile producers in America. As a child she made clay sculptures of her friends. She attended Indiana State Teachers College and in 1933 graduated from Depauw University.

== Career ==
Hadley's artistic career began in painting, both oils and watercolors, which she showed in New York, Boston, and Los Angeles. She won prizes for her paintings at the Arts Club in 1949 and 1950. She also designed murals at places such as City Hall in Louisville, Kentucky and Central Hospital in Anchorage, Alaska; this latter mural was entitled "The Tree of Life".

In 1939, she was unable to find suitable dinnerware for their houseboat, Alice III, so she designed her own. She purchased unglazed greenware from Louisville Pottery Co. (now known as Louisville Stoneware), then freehand painted nautical designs directly onto the pieces. She then applied underglaze decoration to the pieces and fired them in gas kilns at 2300 degrees F. This single fire process bonded the design, body and glaze creating durable stoneware. By the summer of 1940 word of her pottery reached as far as New York City and New England, and orders began rolling in. Hadley made this "personalized pottery" for her friends, sold it in a gift shop, and signed each piece "MA Hadley". She continued to design stoneware for her neighbors and friends, working from her apartment over a horse stable at St. James Court until a backorder of 1000 pieces in 1944 created a need for her own space. In 1945, the Hadleys purchased an old mill building on Story Avenue, and Hadley Pottery was born. By 1949, over a dozen freehand decorators assisted her in producing about 200 pieces daily. At this time, she had a line of dinnerware featuring her designs: the Blue Horse, Ship and Whale, and Pear and Grape, along with customized pieces including door plaques, Christmas items and pieces for children. There were also pottery designs made only for sale in Indianapolis, where she was born.

Hadley also designed paper plates and napkins for the Deco Paper Products company, which she started with Clifford C. Vatter Jr.

== Personal life and death ==
Mary Alice married George E. Hadley, a mechanical engineer, on November 15, 1930.

She died on December 26, 1965, at age 54.

In 1967, the Mary Alice Hadley Foundation was created by George Hadley to promote ceramic arts. In 1989, George Hadley donated 500 pieces to the Speed Art Museum, and her pieces remain in their permanent collection. In 1984, George Hadley gave land in Terre Haute, Indiana to the Rose–Hulman Institute of Technology, which they sold to fund what became known as Hadley Hall. He also gave the institute 499 pieces created by Mary Alice Hadley before her death.

In 2008, the Mary Alice Hadley House on Story Avenue in Louisville, Kentucky was added to the National Register of Historic Places.

== Awards and honors ==
In 1947 Hadley was offered to present an exhibit of her work at New York City's America House by the American Craftsmen's Education Council. In 1952, Mary Alice Hadley received an award from the Museum of Modern Art's Good Design program; her winning design, "Brown Dot" (or "Hot Brown Fleck"), was exhibited in New York and Chicago. Artist Mary Spencer Nay created a portrait of Hadley that was exhibited in Louisville in 1984.
