= Louisville Stoneware =

Pottery business in Louisville, Kentucky, United States

Coordinates: 38°14′35.4″N 85°44′04.0″W

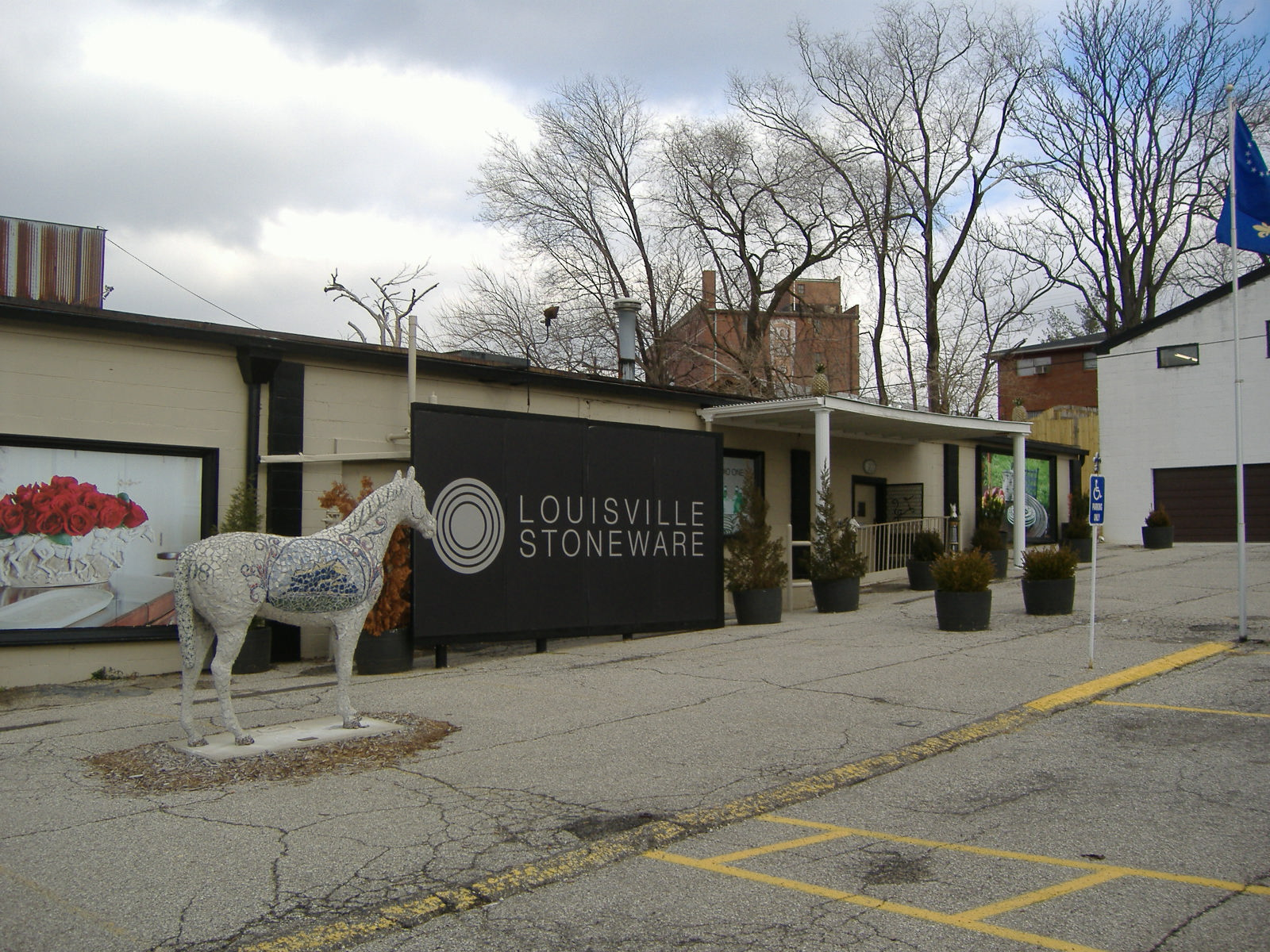
Exterior of the company's Visitor Center in 2008

Stoneware & Co., which was previously known by various other names including the J. B. Taylor Company and Louisville Stoneware until sometime after its sale in July 2007, is a stoneware-producing company located in the Highlands section of Louisville, Kentucky. Founded in 1815, it is one of the oldest stoneware producers in the United States. It specializes in decorating its pottery with Kentucky Derby and Christmas themes, but it has other themes as well: Noah's Ark, Primrose, and Pear being examples. They also create personalized items. Besides pottery, they have made bird baths and bird feeders.

== History ==
The company was founded in 1815 in Louisville, Kentucky, by Jacob Lewis and operated as Lewis Pottery. It changed ownership many times in the following decades, and operated under various names including Bauer Pottery, Cherokee Pottery and Louisville Pottery, among others.

It was purchased by John B. Taylor in 1938 and renamed as the J. B. Taylor Company, operating under that name for several decades. In 1970, J. B. Taylor died, and the company was sold to John Robertson, a ceramics engineer, who renamed the company to Louisville Stoneware. Some of its old patterns are still in production.

Some of the company's oldest patterns include "Harvest" and "Vintage". In the earlier days, the artists were likely to experiment with different designs, and one can occasionally find unusual examples in antique and consignment shops. They also produce pieces on commission for company/event promotions, the best-known being their pieces done to commemorate the running of the Kentucky Derby. They produced patterns for Cracker Barrel Restaurants, Kentucky Fried Chicken, among others.

The stoneware sometimes features different patterns and individual hand painted designs, such as Bachelor Button, Country Flowers, Hummingbirds, 12 Days of Christmas, and Noah's Ark, as well as some decorative pieces including castles, birdhouses, pet dishes, etc.

One of the better-known potters to work for John B. Taylor was Mary Alice Hadley who started a company of her own in 1939. Hadley Pottery is still operating.

Christy Lee Brown purchased the company in 1997, and from 1997 to 2007, Louisville Stoneware sales averaged $3 million a year. In those ten years, the business switched from a mostly wholesale business to mostly retail. In 2007, over 90% of their business was centered around Louisville and Kentucky, but internet and national advertising was hoped to expand distribution, and there were plans to open stores in Chicago, Illinois, Cincinnati, Ohio, and Indianapolis, Indiana.

However, in March 2007, Louisville Stoneware laid off most of its employees (38 out of 49), after which they retooled their visitor center and temporarily opened a store at Oxmoor Center in the St. Matthews area of eastern Louisville. In July 2007, Louisville Stoneware was sold to Stephen A. Smith (Two Stone Inc.), when Brown wished to retire. A corporate executive decided to increase the number of places that sold their stoneware from just one, A Taste of Kentucky, to three additional locations in Louisville, and one apiece in Bardstown, Kentucky, Owensboro, Kentucky, and Cincinnati, Ohio.

Since 2007, the company has remained owned by Stephen A. Smith.

Factory tours are available weekdays by appointment, with group discounts available.

== Products ==
Clay used by the company comes from western Indiana, and may be up to 250 million years old. Dishes made at the factory are versatile for use in ovens, microwave ovens, and dishwashers, and can retain heat for keeping food warm.

== Cultural references ==
Items from Louisville Stoneware are in the Smithsonian Institution and White House. In addition, Queen Elizabeth II was presented a music box made by Louisville Stoneware, given by the wife of Kentucky's governor Ernie Fletcher, that played My Old Kentucky Home when the Queen visited Churchill Downs for the Kentucky Derby in 2007.

The New York Times described Louisville Stoneware as a business especially affected by the United Parcel Service strike of 1997.

During the U.S. presidential campaign of 2004, John Kerry gave a campaign speech on small-business healthcare insurance in May 2004 at Louisville Stoneware.

== Gallery ==
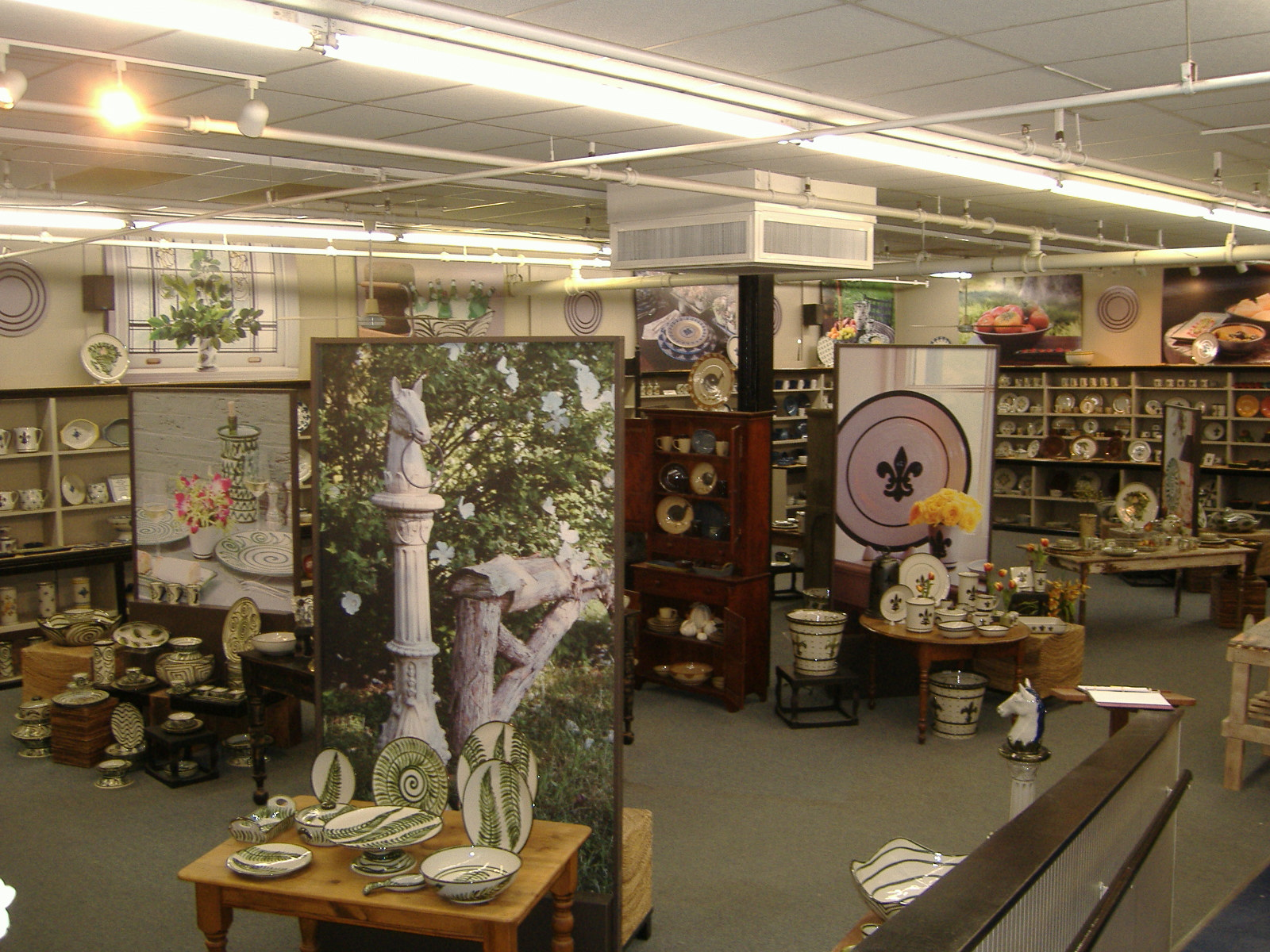
The interior of the Louisville Stoneware visitors center (2008)

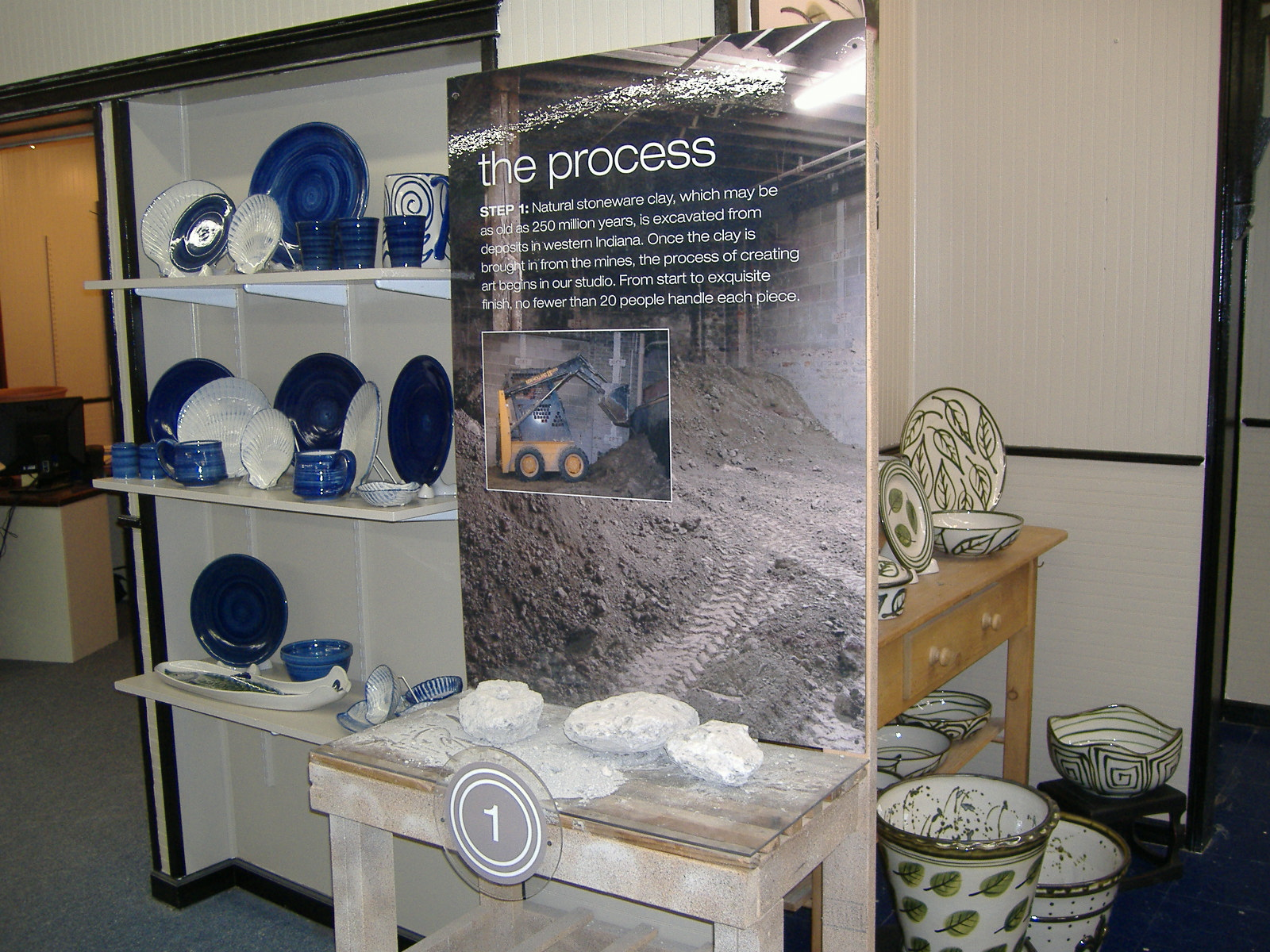
Display at Louisville Stoneware (2008)

== See also ==
- List of attractions and events in the Louisville metropolitan area
