= Hadley Township =

Hadley Township may refer to:

- Hadley Township, Lafayette County, Arkansas, in Lafayette County, Arkansas
- Hadley Township, Pike County, Illinois
- Hadley Township, Michigan
- Hadley Township, St. Louis County, Missouri, in St. Louis County, Missouri
- Hadley Township, Chatham County, North Carolina, in Chatham County, North Carolina
