= Healthy Choice =

Food brand

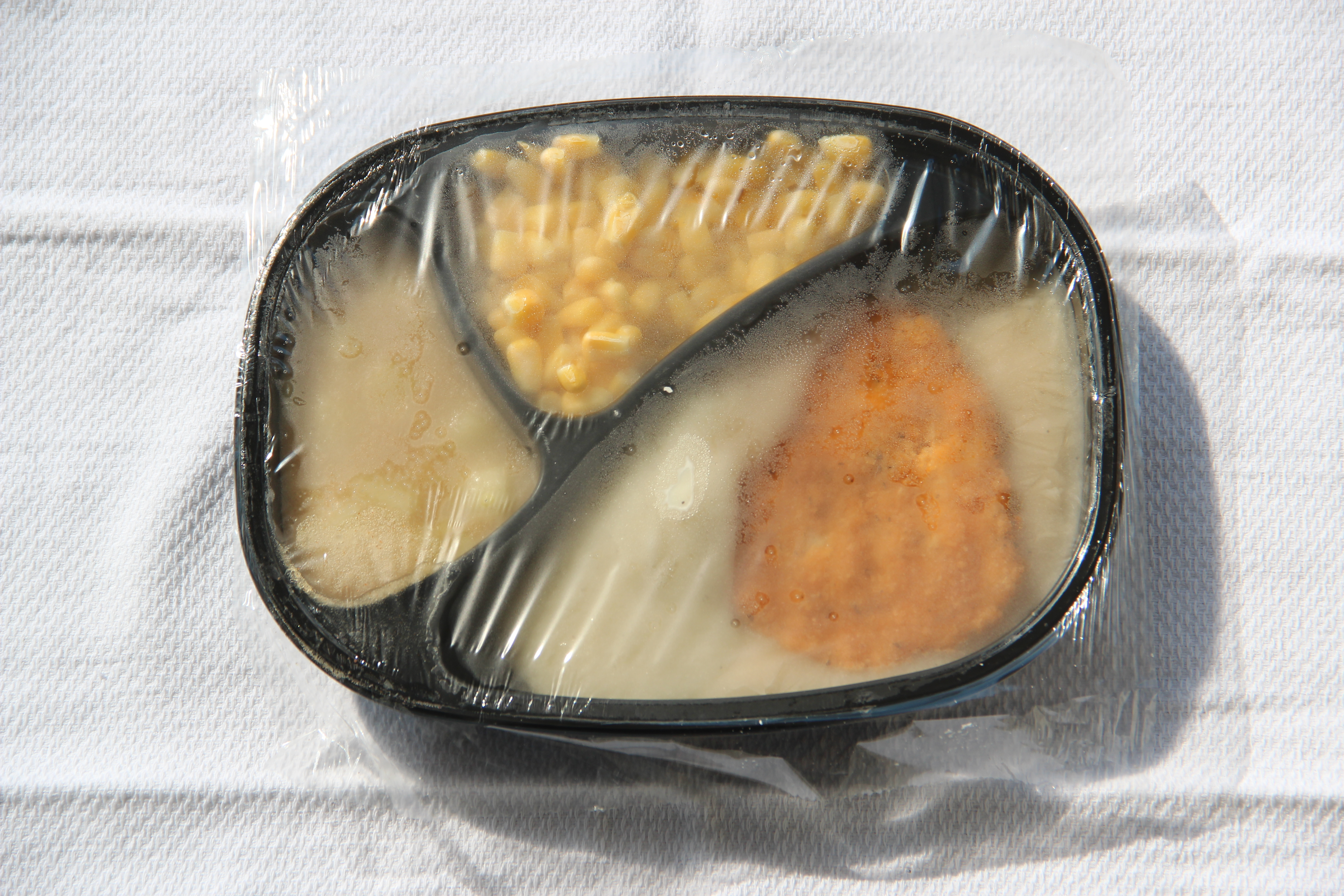
- A frozen package of Healthy Choice's country fried chicken
- Product type: Frozen dinners
- Current owner: Conagra Brands
- Country: United States
- Introduced: 1989
- Website: www.healthychoice.com

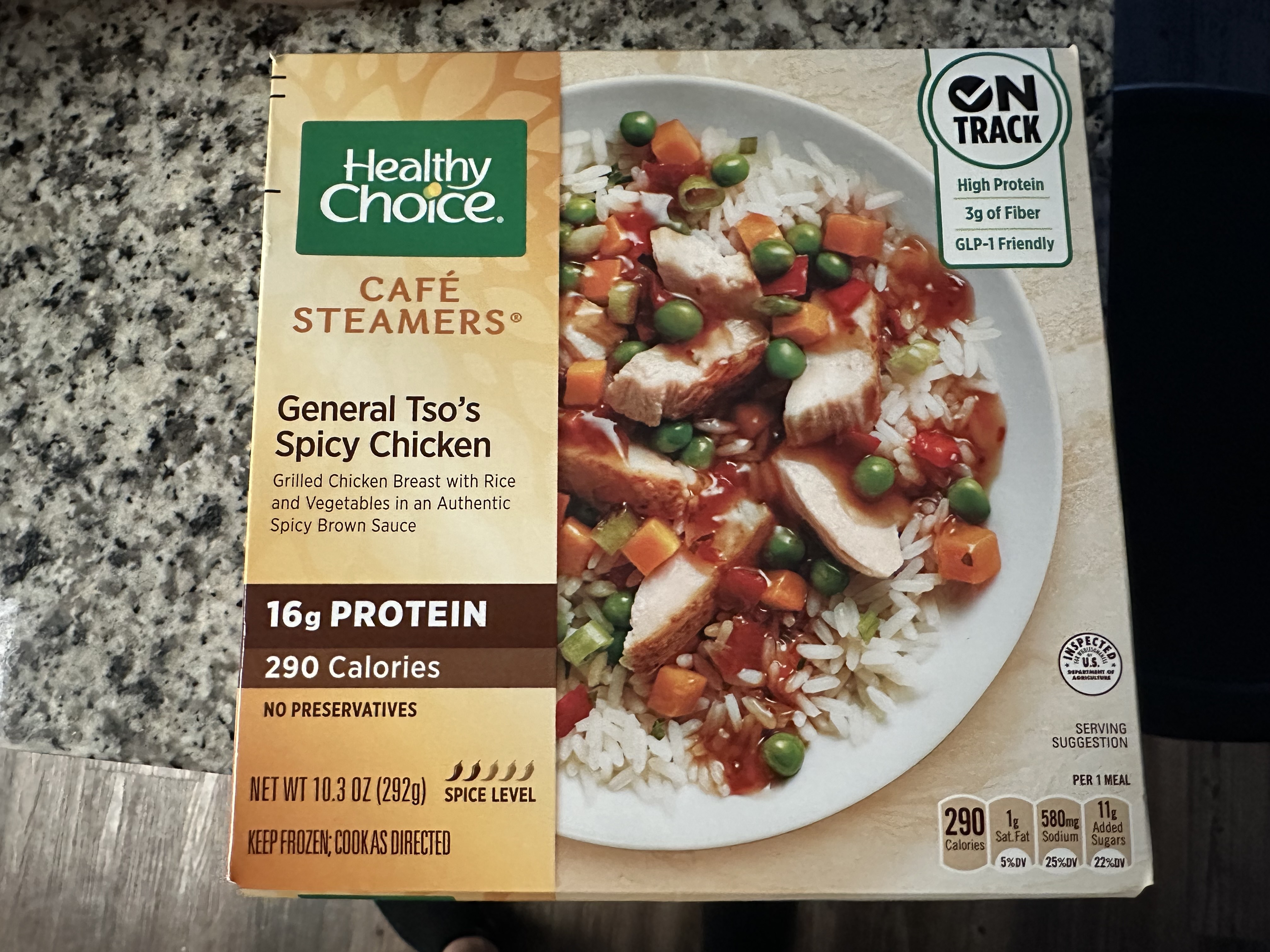
A box of Healthy Choice Cafe Steamers General Tso's Spicy Chicken meal

Healthy Choice is the name of a brand of refrigerated and frozen foods owned by ConAgra Foods. ConAgra sells a broad array of dishes through its Healthy Choice brand, including frozen dinners, side dishes, cold cuts and other meats, canned soups, ice cream, bread, pasta sauce, and popcorn. In Canada, Healthy Choice is a brand of ConAgra Brands. In Australia, McCain Foods, a Canadian company, owns the Healthy Choice name.

== History ==
According to ConAgra's official corporate history, Healthy Choice came into being after then-ConAgra CEO Charles "Mike" Harper suffered a heart attack in 1985. Forced to dramatically alter his diet, he came up with the idea of a line of healthier frozen foods. The brand was introduced to store shelves in 1989.

In April 2009, ConAgra reintroduced Healthy Choice's line of frozen meals along with new products, including a line of All Natural Entrees. To promote the changes, Healthy Choice spent between $900 million and $1.5 billion on a multimedia campaign that included advertisements with actress Julia Louis-Dreyfus featured in commercials directed by Christopher Guest. Other rebranding efforts included new packaging designs.

== See also ==
- David Phillips – who won a large amount of frequent flyer points in a Healthy Choice promotion. A subplot in the film Punch-Drunk Love is based on Phillips.
