= Headlee =

Headlee is a surname. Notable people with the name include:

- Celeste Headlee (born 1969), journalist
- Richard Headlee (1930–2004)
- Russell Headlee (1908–1987), American politician from Pennsylvania

== See also ==
- Headlee, Indiana
- Hedley (surname)
- Headley (surname)
