= Jack Hedley (disambiguation) =

Jack Hedley is an English film and television actor.

Jack Hedley may also refer to:

- Jack Hedley (Australian footballer) (1930–2021), Australian rules footballers with North Melbourne
- Jack Hedley (English footballer) (1923–1985), association footballer with Everton, Gateshead and Sunderland

== See also ==
- John Hedley (disambiguation)
