= Punch-Drunk Love =

2002 film by Paul Thomas Anderson

- Theatrical release poster
- Directed by: Paul Thomas Anderson
- Written by: Paul Thomas Anderson
- Produced by: JoAnne Sellar; Daniel Lupi; Paul Thomas Anderson
- Starring: Adam Sandler; Emily Watson; Philip Seymour Hoffman; Luis Guzmán
- Cinematography: Robert Elswit
- Edited by: Leslie Jones
- Music by: Jon Brion
- Production companies: Columbia Pictures; Revolution Studios; New Line Cinema; Ghoulardi Film Company
- Distributed by: Sony Pictures Releasing
- Release dates: May 19, 2002 (Cannes); November 1, 2002 (United States)
- Running time: 95 minutes
- Country: United States
- Language: English
- Budget: $25 million
- Box office: $24.7 million

Punch-Drunk Love is a 2002 American absurdist romantic comedy drama film, produced, written and directed by Paul Thomas Anderson. Adam Sandler stars as an entrepreneur with social anxiety who falls in love with his sister's co-worker, played by Emily Watson. The supporting cast includes Philip Seymour Hoffman and Luis Guzmán.

After working on his third film Magnolia, Anderson planned to make his next film around 90 minutes, with Sandler in mind as the lead due to Anderson's love for him and his films. It features the video art of Jeremy Blake in the form of visual interludes.

Punch-Drunk Love was produced by Columbia Pictures, Revolution Studios, New Line Cinema and Ghoulardi Film Company, and distributed by Sony Pictures Releasing. It premiered at the 2002 Cannes Film Festival on May 19, 2002 before being released theatrically in the United States on November 1, 2002.

Despite its box-office disappointment, grossing $24.7 million against its $25 million production budget, Punch-Drunk Love received positive reviews from critics, with Sandler's performance receiving widespread acclaim, making a launchpad for Sandler to pursue dramatic or unconventional film roles outside of his usual mainstream comedies. A favorite of several prominent filmmakers and actors, it has been included in lists of the greatest movies of the 21st century.

== Plot ==
In Los Angeles, Barry Egan is a bachelor who owns a company that markets themed toilet plungers and other novelty items. He has seven overbearing sisters who regularly ridicule and emotionally abuse him, and he leads a lonely life punctuated by fits of rage and social anxiety.

One day, Barry witnesses an inexplicable car accident, picks up an abandoned harmonium from the street, and meets Lena Leonard, a co-worker of Elizabeth, one of his sisters. Lena had orchestrated the meeting after seeing him in Elizabeth's family picture at work. Barry attends his sister's birthday party, where they tease him about his sexuality, leading to a violent outburst in which he breaks sliding glass doors. Afterwards, he privately asks one of his brothers-in-law, a dentist, to refer him to a therapist.

At home, Barry calls a phone sex line to cope with his loneliness. The phone sex operator tries to extort money from him and then sends four henchmen, who are brothers, to collect. This complicates his budding relationship with Lena, as well as his plan to exploit a loophole in a Healthy Choice promotion and amass a million frequent-flyer miles by purchasing large quantities of pudding.

When Lena leaves for Hawaii on a business trip, Barry decides to follow her. He uses his sister to find Lena, who is overjoyed to see him. As the two spend time together, Barry's sister calls Lena, who lies to her about being in contact with him. The romance develops further, leading to Barry's relief from his emotional isolation.

On the return trip, the four brothers ram Barry's car, mildly injuring Lena. After fighting them off with a tire iron, Barry leaves her at the hospital and sets out to end the harassment. He calls the phone sex line back and discovers the "supervisor" is the owner of a mattress store. Barry drives all the way to Provo, Utah, to confront the owner, Dean, face to face. At first trying to intimidate Barry, Dean finds him more intimidating once he learns that he has come all the way from California. They both agree "that's that".

Returning home, Barry visits Lena to explain why the accident happened. He begs for forgiveness, pledging his loyalty and to use his frequent-flyer miles to accompany her on all future business trips after his pudding miles are processed. Lena confesses she was more upset at being left at the hospital, but forgives Barry and they embrace.

== Cast ==
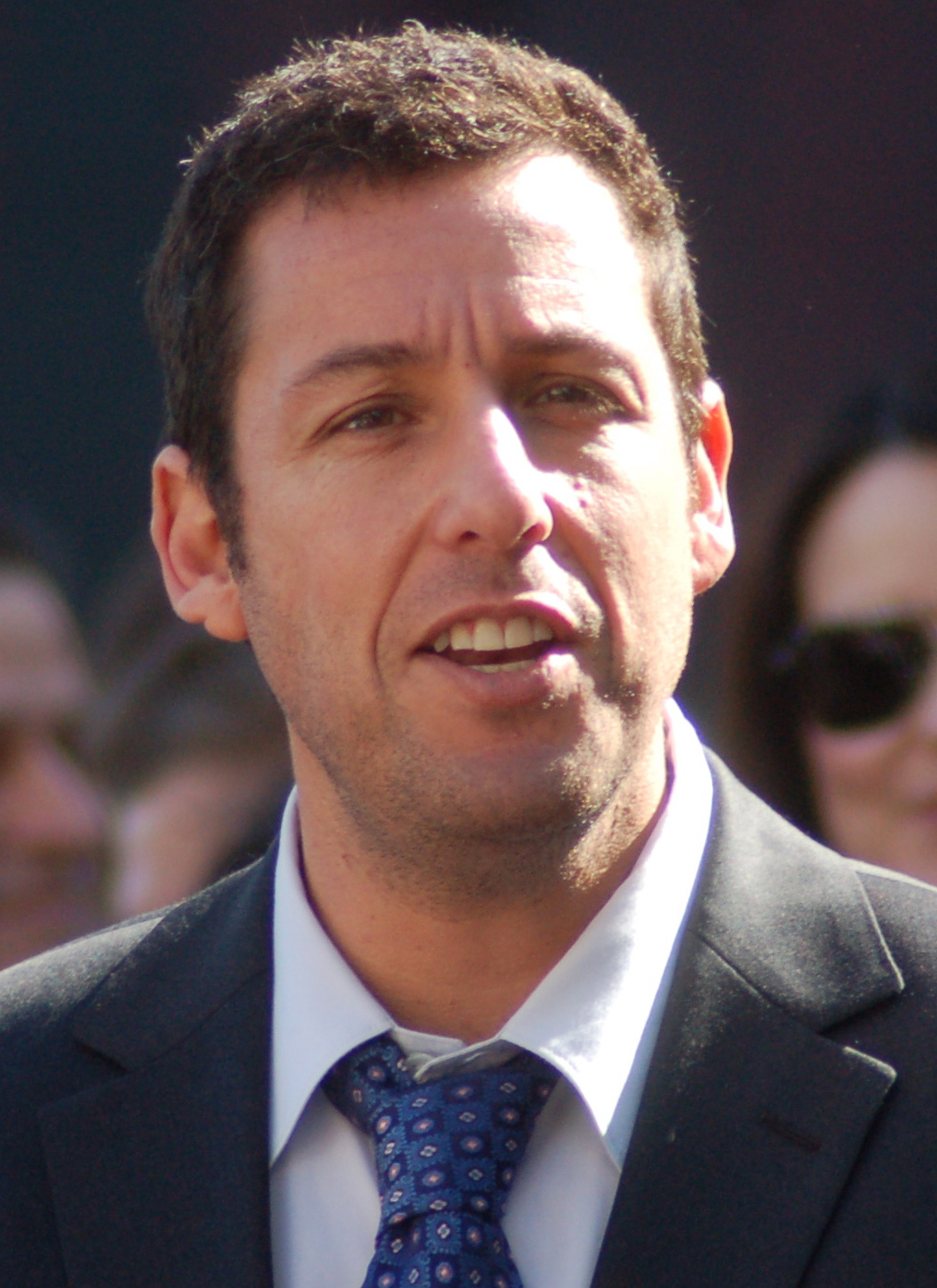
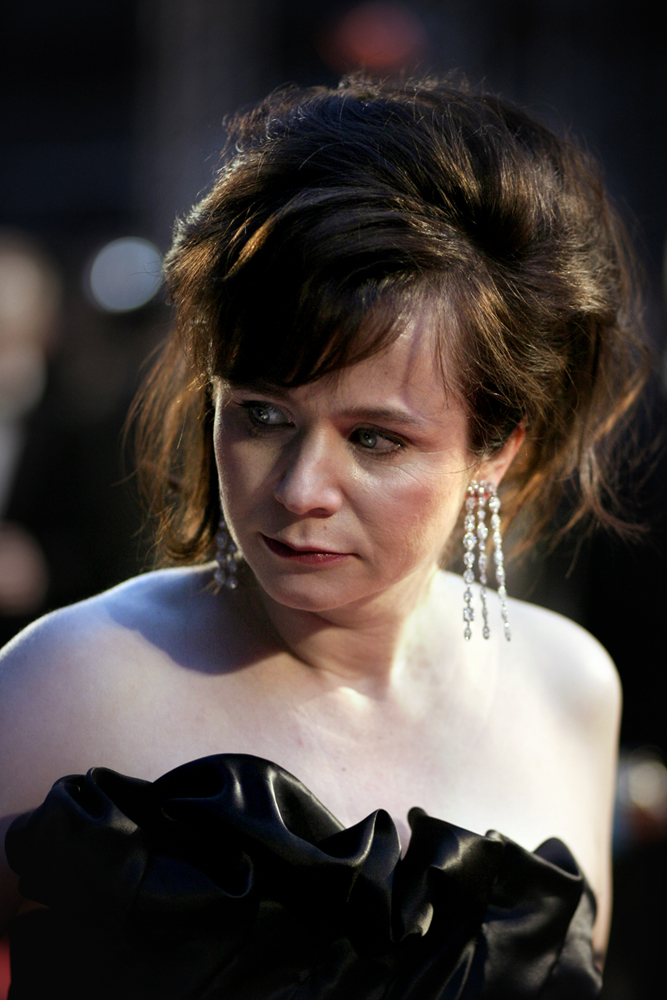
Adam Sandler (left) and Emily Watson, who respectively play Barry Egan and Lena Leonard
- Adam Sandler as Barry Egan, an unmarried entrepreneur with social anxiety
- Emily Watson as Lena Leonard, Barry's love interest and Elizabeth's friend and co-worker
- Philip Seymour Hoffman as Dean Trumbell, the owner of the mattress store
- Luis Guzmán as Lance, Barry's co-worker
- Mary Lynn Rajskub as Elizabeth Egan, one of Barry's seven overbearing sisters
- Lisa Spector as Susan Egan, the second of Barry's seven overbearing sisters
- Julie Hermelin as Kathleen Egan, the third of Barry's seven overbearing sisters
- Karen Hermelin as Anna Egan, the fourth of Barry's seven overbearing sisters
- Hazel Mailloux as Rhonda Egan, the fifth of Barry's seven overbearing sisters
- Nicole Gelbard as Nicole Egan, the sixth of Barry's seven overbearing sisters
- Mia Weinberg as Gilda Egan, the seventh of Barry's seven overbearing sisters
- David Stevens as David
- Jimmy Stevens as Jim
- Nathan Stevens as Nathan
- Mike D. Stevens as Mike D.
- Ashley Clark as phone sex operator
- Robert Smigel as Walter, a dentist and Barry's brother-in-law

== Production ==
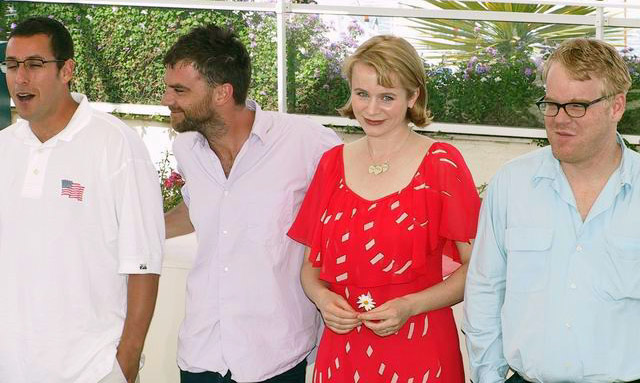
(L to R) Adam Sandler, Paul Thomas Anderson, Emily Watson and Philip Seymour Hoffman at the 2002 Cannes Film Festival

After the success of Magnolia, Paul Thomas Anderson stated that he was determined to make his next film ninety minutes long and stated that he wanted to cast Adam Sandler in this film. After establishing his style with his previous films, he wanted to challenge himself within the parameters of a ninety-minute-long romantic comedy. Anderson is a fan of Sandler's comedies, and said his love for his films became "obsession-level" after seeing and enjoying Sandler's 1999 film Big Daddy. He was determined to make a film with Sandler as a lead, saying, "He's always just made me laugh, he gets me, I wanted a piece of him." He specifically wrote Punch-Drunk Love with Sandler and Emily Watson in mind. Anderson had to convince producer JoAnne Sellar, who was "befuddled" with his desire to cast Sandler, that he was the right person for the job. Anderson took inspiration for Barry Egan's characterization from watching the Saturday Night Live: The Best of Adam Sandler compilation DVD, primarily with the skit "The Denise Show", saying,

I saw this Best of Adam Sandler DVD from Saturday Night Live, and an amazing thing happened. There's this moment when he's doing this talk show called The Denise Show, about his ex-girlfriend who's left him, and his father calls up and says, "What are you doing; you're embarrassing the family". And Adam goes into this fit of rage, screaming at his father, and honest to God I saw this moment where it appears as if the whites of his eyes turn black and they roll back in his head. It was like, he just lost his mind. I would play it back, over and over again, and you can see him kinda snap back to reality. The audience is laughing and it's almost like he finally started to hear them laughing a few seconds later.

Anderson described the film as an "art-house Adam Sandler film", while film critic Roger Ebert felt Anderson "deconstructed the Adam Sandler movies and put them back together again in a new way at a different level". In writing the elements of the Healthy Choice frequent-flier miles sub-plot line, Anderson was inspired by the real-life story of David Phillips, who successfully amassed over a million frequent flier miles from buying $3,000 worth of Healthy Choice's pudding. Anderson received approval from Phillips and Healthy Choice to adapt Phillips' story into the film. A major source of inspiration for Punch-Drunk Love came from the films of Jacques Tati, while Barry's blue suit was inspired by musicals, such as The Band Wagon (1953) and Singin' in the Rain (1952).

Filming and editing took place over a year and a half for several reasons, such as Anderson scrapping the first two weeks of shooting over fears that he was "making the same movie" as his previous filmography, as well as the threat of Hollywood strikes in 2001, that led to Sandler and Watson filming other projects in between filming Punch-Drunk Love. Anderson declined more funding from Revolution Studios, as he was determined to keep the film under $30 million in terms of budget.

Anderson brought in the visual artist Jeremy Blake to create what The New York Times called "trippy, fluid sequences of abstract art" to use as transitions in the film.

=== Casting ===
Sandler shared phone numbers with Tom Cruise when he visited Saturday Night Live during the taping of an episode hosted by Cruise's then-wife Nicole Kidman. While filming Magnolia, Anderson contacted Sandler through a phone call with Cruise and expressed his intention to write a film for him, and despite being unfamiliar with Anderson, Sandler gave his blessing. Sandler was intimidated upon first viewing Magnolia, leading him to be "fucking terrified" and doubt his ability to carry Anderson's next film. Anderson helped alleviate Sandler's fears upon personally delivering the script. Sandler's casting was officially announced in November 2000; the unconventional pairing shocked reporters as Anderson was a rising filmmaker noted for his critically acclaimed films, while Sandler was known for negatively-reviewed mainstream comedies. Sean Penn was originally offered the role of Dean Trumbell, but turned it down and Philip Seymour Hoffman was cast instead.

Aside from the primary named cast, all on-screen actors are non-professionals, which Anderson found more interesting and less complicated.

=== Music ===
The score to Punch-Drunk Love was composed by Jon Brion. As with Magnolia, Brion and Anderson collaborated heavily for the production of the film's score. However, rather than scoring the film after rough footage had been shot, Brion made compositions while the film was being made. During the scoring process, Brion would experiment with tones and sounds, carefully making note of what Anderson would respond to. Anderson would create the vocal tempos he would envision in the score and use them on set, even to the extent of inspiring the pace of Sandler's performance.

The film's score features no harmonium in the score outside of the notes Sandler plays on it. Brion introduced the instrument to Anderson during their work on Magnolia; however, an article stating it was used heavily in the score is incorrect per Brion's account. Many scenes between Sandler's character and the instrument were inspired by Brion. For instance, Brion once found a harmonium with a hole in its bellows, before going on tour with Aimee Mann. To fix the problem, he covered the hole with duct tape. The situation is mirrored in the film.

== Reception ==
=== Box office ===
Punch-Drunk Love began a limited domestic release on October 11, 2002, grossing $118,539 from five theaters. It had grossed $17.8 million in the United States, and an international total of $6.8 million, for a worldwide box office total of $24.6 million.

=== Critical reception ===
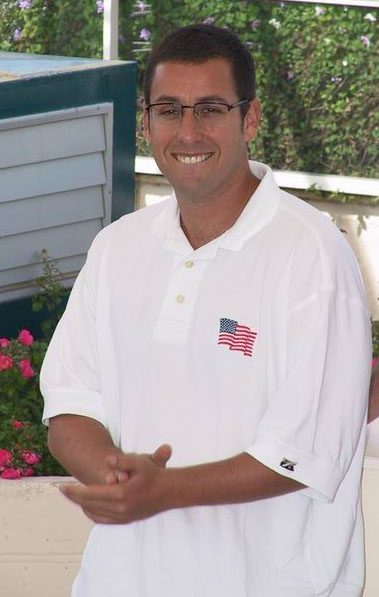
Adam Sandler's performance as Barry Egan received acclaim and surprised many critics due to it being a departure from his usual film roles. He received a Golden Globe Award nomination for Best Actor in a Musical or Comedy.

On review aggregator Rotten Tomatoes, the film holds an approval rating of 79% based on 201 reviews. The website's critical consensus states, "Odd, touching, and unique, Punch-Drunk Love is also delightfully funny, utilizing Adam Sandler's comic persona to explore the life of a lonely guy who finds love." On Metacritic, the film has a weighted average score of 78 out of 100, based on 37 critics, indicating "generally favorable reviews". Audiences polled by CinemaScore gave the film an average grade of "D+" on an A+ to F scale.

Writing for Rolling Stone, Peter Travers felt the pairing of Anderson and Sandler was "parallel lines that meet triumphantly in a mesmerizer that stays true to both of their anarchic spirits," and praised the cast's performances, ultimately calling the film's effect "intoxicating." Angie Errigo of Empire complimented Anderson's direction as "simply captivating and exquisitely controlled, with a restless mood and no end of fascinating, beautifully-orchestrated oddness," and said, "One of the joys of this film...is that you really have no idea what's going to happen next." Daniel Fierman of Entertainment Weekly thought the film was a "meditation on true love, the ways in which we are all bizarre, the magic of the perfect match, and the preposterously unlikely nature of the whole enterprise." The Los Angeles Times' Kenneth Turan stated that the film was "a comedy of discomfort and rage that turns unexpectedly sweet and pure." Writing for Variety, Todd McCarthy said that "there is no mistaking the exceeding creativity that has gone into nearly every shot, transition, narrative choice and musical selection," and praised Adam Sandler, Emily Watson, and Philip Seymour Hoffman's performances. He also opined that "Sandler fans will probably take it as a lightweight, but agreeable enough, outing with slightly weird elements to it, while Anderson partisans could split between those who will revel in the thrill of his ongoing creative inventions and others who may find this light lifting between heavy workouts." Charles Taylor of Salon.com described the film as a "manic-depressive romantic comedy that aspires to the soul of a musical," and complimented Anderson's direction, Christopher Scarabosio's sound design, and Jon Brion's score. He believed that Anderson properly utilized the "threat of sudden, bellowing, red-faced rage" of Sandler's known comic persona in the film.

David Ansen of Newsweek described the film as "a romantic comedy on the verge of a nervous breakdown," praising the film's unpredictability and cinematography, but felt Lena was underwritten, concluding that it was "an emotional jigsaw puzzle that's missing a couple of crucial pieces." Giving the film three stars out of five, Peter Bradshaw of The Guardian felt the story was "deeply unconvincing" and "a short cut to an entirely unearned emotional resolution that doesn't begin to illuminate the jagged and disturbing - and gripping - ideas that swirl around the beginning of this film," and felt the film's core romance was "the most bafflingly unreal love story you can imagine."

Sandler's lead performance received acclaim. Giving the film three-and-a-half stars out of four, Roger Ebert of the Chicago Sun-Times praised Sandler's performance in his review, saying, "Sandler, liberated from the constraints of formula, reveals unexpected depths as an actor. Watching this film, you can imagine him in Dennis Hopper roles. He has darkness, obsession and power. He can't go on making those moronic comedies forever, can he?" Errigo called the film "an anti-Adam Sandler movie that proves to be a highly defining moment for the actor" and called Sandler's performance "astonishing." She also felt Watson was "relishing a calming character who is on an even keel." Entertainment Weekly's Owen Gleiberman said Sandler was "utterly winning to watch" and added that "he has become a tender and arresting presence, like a fusion of Chaplin’s Little Tramp, Woody Allen, and Edward Scissorhands." Desson Thomson of The Washington Post proclaimed that Sandler gave "the performance of his life" in the film.

=== Accolades ===
Sandler went on to win Best Actor at the Gijón International Film Festival for his performance and was also nominated for the Golden Globe Award for Best Actor – Motion Picture Musical or Comedy. Anderson won the award for Best Director at the 2002 Cannes Film Festival and the film was nominated for the Palme d'Or. The film was nominated for the Grand Prix of the Belgian Syndicate of Cinema Critics.

Award	Category	Subject	Result	Ref.
American Cinema Editors	Best Edited Feature Film – Comedy or Musical	Leslie Jones	Nominated	
Awards Circuit Community Awards	Best Original Screenplay	Paul Thomas Anderson	Nominated	
Belgian Syndicate of Cinema Critics	Grand Prix		Nominated	
Cannes Film Festival	Palme d'Or		Nominated	
Cannes Film Festival	Best Director	Paul Thomas Anderson	Won	
Central Ohio Film Critics Association	Best Picture		Won	
Central Ohio Film Critics Association	Best Director	Paul Thomas Anderson	Won	
Central Ohio Film Critics Association	Best Original Screenplay	Paul Thomas Anderson	Won	
Chicago Film Critics Association	Best Director	Paul Thomas Anderson	Nominated	
Chicago Film Critics Association	Best Screenplay	Paul Thomas Anderson	Nominated	
Chicago Film Critics Association	Best Score	Jon Brion	Nominated	
Chlotrudis Awards	Best Movie		Nominated	
Chlotrudis Awards	Best Director	Paul Thomas Anderson	Nominated	
Chlotrudis Awards	Best Actor	Adam Sandler	Nominated	
Chlotrudis Awards	Audience Award – Best Movie		Won	
Chlotrudis Awards	Audience Award – Best Director	Paul Thomas Anderson	Won	
Chlotrudis Awards	Audience Award – Best Actor	Adam Sandler	Won	
Gijón International Film Festival	Best Feature		Nominated	
Gijón International Film Festival	Best Actor	Adam Sandler	Won	
Gijón International Film Festival	Best Screenplay	Paul Thomas Anderson	Won	
Gold Derby Awards	Best Original Screenplay	Paul Thomas Anderson	Nominated	
Golden Globe Award	Best Actor – Motion Picture Musical or Comedy	Adam Sandler	Nominated	
Golden Schmoes Awards	Best Screenplay	Paul Thomas Anderson	Nominated	
Golden Schmoes Awards	Best Breakthrough Performance	Adam Sandler	Nominated	
Imagen Foundation Awards	Best Supporting Actor – Film	Luis Guzmán	Won	
International Online Cinema Awards	Best Original Screenplay	Paul Thomas Anderson	Nominated	
Las Vegas Film Critics Society	Best Picture		Nominated	
Las Vegas Film Critics Society	Best Director	Paul Thomas Anderson	Nominated	
Las Vegas Film Critics Society	Best Screenplay	Paul Thomas Anderson	Nominated	
Motovun Film Festival	Propeller of Motovun		Won	
MTV Movie Awards	Best Kiss	Adam Sandler & Emily Watson	Nominated	
National Society of Film Critics	Best Cinematography	Robert Elswit	Nominated	
Online Film & Television Association	Best Original Screenplay	Paul Thomas Anderson	Nominated	
Online Film Critics Society	Top Ten Films		7th Place	
Online Film Critics Society	Best Original Screenplay	Paul Thomas Anderson	Nominated	
Online Film Critics Society	Best Original Score	Jon Brion	Nominated	
Phoenix Film Critics Society	Best Screenplay	Paul Thomas Anderson	Nominated	
Phoenix Film Critics Society	Best Original Score	Jon Brion	Nominated	
Phoenix Film Critics Society	Best Use of Previously Published or Recorded Music		Nominated	
Satellite Awards	Best Motion Picture – Comedy or Musical		Nominated	
Satellite Awards	Best Actor in a Motion Picture – Comedy or Musical	Adam Sandler	Nominated	
Satellite Awards	Best Supporting Actor in a Motion Picture – Comedy or Musical	Philip Seymour Hoffman	Nominated	
Seattle Film Critics Society	Best Music	Jon Brion	Nominated	
Stinkers Bad Movies Awards	Most Intrusive Musical Score	Jon Brion	Nominated	
Toronto Film Critics Association	Best Film		Nominated	
Toronto Film Critics Association	Best Director	Paul Thomas Anderson	Won	
Toronto Film Critics Association	Best Supporting Actress	Emily Watson	Won	
Toronto Film Critics Association	Best Screenplay	Paul Thomas Anderson	Nominated	
Vancouver Film Critics Circle	Best Supporting Actress	Emily Watson	Nominated	
Village Voice Film Poll	Best Film		6th Place	
Village Voice Film Poll	Best Director	Paul Thomas Anderson	2nd Place	

=== Legacy ===
Punch-Drunk Love came in at #33 in The A.V. Club's "Top 50 films of the '00s", while Time Out listed the film as one of the best films of the 21st century. In June 2025, the film ranked number 56 on The New York Times' list of "The 100 Best Movies of the 21st Century" and was one of the films voted for the "Readers' Choice" edition of the list, finishing at number 103. In July 2025, it ranked number 78 on Rolling Stone's list of "The 100 Best Movies of the 21st Century."

Filmmakers Francis Ford Coppola, Lee Unkrich, Judd Apatow, Kleber Mendonça, Miranda July, Bong Joon-ho, David Gordon Green, Guillermo del Toro, Jason Reitman, Isabel Sandoval, Barry Jenkins and Taika Waititi, and actors Brad Pitt, Bill Nighy, Owen Wilson, Javier Bardem, Daniel Day-Lewis, Cillian Murphy, Joseph Gordon-Levitt, Austin Butler, Guy Pearce, Timothée Chalamet, and Andrew Scott have cited it as one of their favorite films. The film was a major visual influence for the 2024 Pixar film Inside Out 2.

When asked about Punch-Drunk Love following its twentieth anniversary in 2022, Sandler said that the film enabled him to pursue films different from his usual roles, while sharing that it helped forge a close friendship between him and Anderson. The two reunited in their first project since Punch-Drunk Love when Anderson helped film segments of Sandler's Netflix comedy special 100% Fresh (2018).

Critics agreed that Punch-Drunk Love remained as one of Sandler's best acting performances, and was a launchpad for Sandler to take on dramatic roles or opportunities outside of his usual mainstream comedies. In a retrospective review following its 2017 release on Netflix, GQ's Miranda Popkey called the film "Adam Sandler's finest performance and P.T. Anderson's most underrated work," describing it as "a paean to love as a source of unfathomable power." Far Out's Arun Starkey described Punch-Drunk Love as Sandler's "first true foray into auteur cinema" and "the first indicator of his prowess as an actor and shows that if he is given a good enough script that isn't shackled by the tropes of a mainstream genre, he can actually do very well at carrying a three-dimensional character onto the big screen." Alan Dorich of Comic Book Resources shared that the film's critical success "changed the course of Sandler's career forever" and "opened new opportunities that enhanced his legacy as a performer," leading to other dramatic roles in films such as Men, Women & Children (2014), The Meyerowitz Stories (2017), and Uncut Gems (2019).

== Home media ==
The film was released on VHS and DVD by Columbia TriStar Home Entertainment on June 24, 2003.

The Criterion Collection released the film on Blu-ray in November 2016 with a restored HD transfer, the first time the company had done so for Anderson and Sandler. It has behind-the-scenes featurette about a recording session for the film's soundtrack, a Cannes press conference and deleted scenes.
