= Adley =

Adley is a first and last name of English origin. Notable people with the surname Adley include:

- Robert Adley (British politician) (1935–1993), British politician, MP for Bristol NE and later Christchurch
- Robert Adley (American politician) (born 1947), American politician
- Big Daddy Carlos (born 1968), American restaurant and night-club owner, birth-name Carlos Adley

Notable people with the given name Adley include:

- Adley H. Gladden (1810–1862), American general for the Confederate Army
- Adley Rutschman (born 1998), American baseball catcher

== See also ==
- Adley Creek
