= Headley =

Headley may refer to:

== Places ==
- Headley, Basingstoke and Deane in the civil parish of Ashford Hill with Headley
- Headley, East Hampshire
  - Headley Grange, Hampshire
- Headley, Surrey

== Other uses ==
- Headley Baxter (1919–2004), British tennis player and coach
- Headley Bennett (1931–2016), Jamaican saxophonist
- Headley Cunningham (1929–2018), Jamaican politician
- Headley Keith (1927–1997), South African test cricketer
- Headley (surname)
- Baron Headley, a title in the Peerage of Ireland
- Headley Britannia, a horse competing at CCI**** level in the sport of eventing, ridden by Lucinda Fredericks
- Headley Court, Defence Medical Rehabilitation Centre (DMRC)

== See also ==
- Hadleigh (disambiguation)
- Hadley (disambiguation)
- Hedley (disambiguation)
