= Hadleigh =

Hadleigh may refer to:

== People ==
- Boze Hadleigh, an American journalist who writes of celebrity gossip and entertainment
- Hadleigh Parkes (born 1987), New Zealand-born Welsh rugby player

== Places ==
- Hadleigh, Essex, a town in Essex
  - Hadleigh Bus Depot, one of the depots used by First Essex
- Hadleigh Castle, a castle near Hadleigh, Essex
- Hadleigh, Suffolk, a town in Suffolk
  - Hadleigh Railway, a seven and a half mile long single-track railway branch-line from Bentley to Hadleigh, Suffolk (now closed)
  - Hadleigh High School, a high school in Hadleigh, Suffolk
  - Hadleigh railway station, a railway station in Hadleigh, Suffolk
  - Hadleigh United F.C., a football club in Hadleigh, Suffolk
- Hadleigh Heath, a hamlet near Hadleigh, Suffolk

== Others ==
- Hadleigh (TV series), a British television series made by Yorkshire Television
- HMS Hadleigh Castle (K355), a Castle-class corvette of Britain's Royal Navy
- Hadleigh Farm Mountain Bike International, a 2012 one-off mountain bike race

== See also ==
- Hadlee, a surname
- Hadley (disambiguation)
- Headley (disambiguation)
- Hedley (disambiguation)
