= Hadlee =

Hadlee is a surname. Notable people with the surname include:

- Barry Hadlee (born 1941), played two One Day Cricket Internationals for New Zealand
- Dayle Hadlee (born 1948), former New Zealand cricketer who played in 26 Tests and 11 ODIs from 1969 to 1978
- Richard Hadlee, MBE (born 1951), former New Zealand cricketer who played provincial cricket for Canterbury, Nottinghamshire and Tasmania
- Walter Hadlee (1915–2006), New Zealand cricketer and Test match captain

== See also ==
- Chappell–Hadlee Trophy in cricket is an annual ODI series between Australia and New Zealand
- Hadleigh (disambiguation)
- Hadley (disambiguation)
