= Joshua Hadley =

American pioneer, settler and public official

- Born: c.1785 North Carolina, US
- Died: 1845; Texas
- Spouses: Obedience Grantham; Joyce Voilet Bostick McGuffin
- Children: 4

Joshua Hadley (c.1785–1845) was an American pioneer, settler and public official. He participated in the Convention of 1832 and 1835 Consultation.

== Life ==
He was born c1785 in North Carolina to Benjamin Hadley (son of Thomas Jefferson Hadley), and Elizabeth King. The couple lived in Tennessee, before moving to what is now San Augustine County, Texas in 1830. On May 7, 1831 he was the recipient of a league of land that stood to the north-east of Anderson, Texas. He constructed a fort, known locally as the Hadley Fort to protect the family against Native American attacks. The fort was the site of an Indian raid in 1840 which saw a woman scalped.

During the Convention of 1832, Hadley represented the District of Viesca. In 1835 he was elected Alcalde. Hadley also served in the Army of the Republic of Texas in 1836. Due to his military service, he was gifted land in Grimes County, totalling 320 acres.

Throughout his life, he married twice, firstly to Obedience Grantham, with whom he had five children, and secondly the widowed Joyce Voilet Bostick McGuffin.

== Death ==
Hadley died in 1845 after falling from his horse.

== See also ==
- Grimes County, Texas
