= John Hadley (disambiguation) =

John Hadley (1682–1744) was a British mathematician and inventor of the octant.

John Hadley may also refer to:

- John Hadley (chemist) (1731–1764), British chemist and physician
- John Hadley (Mayor of London) (fl.1300s), Mayor and MP for London, father-in-law of William Pecche
- John Hadley (philosopher) (born 1966), Australian ethicist
- John V. Hadley (c. 1839–1842–1915), Justice of the Indiana Supreme Court
