= Headley (surname) =

Headley is a surname. Notable people with the surname include:

- Chase Headley (born 1984), American baseball player
- David Headley (born 1960), Pakistani-American terrorist
- Dean Headley (born 1970), cricketer
- Frederick Webb Headley (1856–1919), English naturalist
- George Headley (1909–1983), West Indian cricketer
- Heather Headley (born 1974), Trinidadian-American musician
- Hubert Klyne Headley (1906–1996), American composer and musician
- Justina Headley (born 1968), Taiwanese-American author
- Ron Headley (born 1939), West Indian cricketer
- Shari Headley (born 1964), American Actress
- Victor Headley (born 1959), British author
- Win Headley (1949–2023), American football player

== See also ==
- Headlee
- Hedley (surname)
