= Hadley Pottery =

American-based pottery and stoneware company

Coordinates: 38°15′29.8″N 85°43′19.4″W

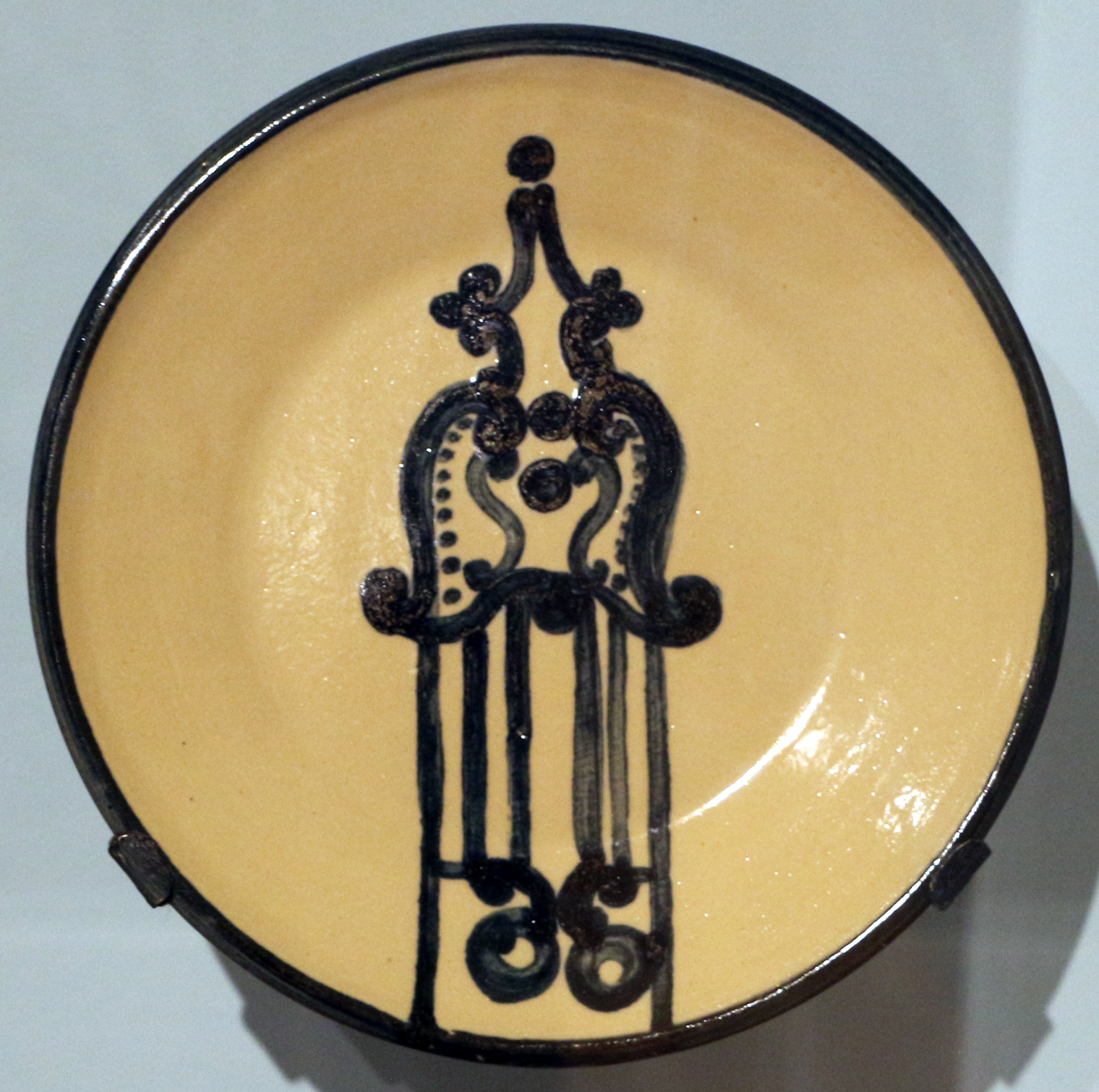
- Industry: Pottery and stoneware
- Founded: 1939
- Founder: Mary Alice Hadley
- Headquarters: Louisville, Kentucky
- Website: hadleypottery.com

Hadley Pottery is an American-based pottery and stoneware company started by Mary Alice Hadley and her husband George E. Hadley in 1945. It is located on Story Avenue in the Butchertown neighborhood of Louisville, Kentucky.

== History ==
Hadley Pottery had its inception in 1939, when Mary Alice Hadley made a custom set of dishware for a cruiser she and her husband George Hadley had on the Ohio River. She created her own design with a nautical flag motif and painted it on unfired blanks that she fired at the Louisville Pottery Co. When friends saw the design of her dishes, they were interested in purchasing dishes of their own, so Hadley created a few more at the Louisville Pottery Co.

With more interest and demand, the Hadleys finally purchased what became the Hadley Pottery building at 1570 Story Ave. in Louisville in October 1944 as a birthday present for Mrs. Hadley. Mrs. Hadley painted all of the murals on the walls of the building and the Hadley Pottery opened for business in 1945. Hadley created a wide range of designs for the company, often inspired by Louisville motifs such as the fleur-de-lis.

After Mary Alice Hadley died in 1965, nine painters continued to hand-paint pieces which are still signed "M.A. Hadley". In 1979 Kenneth Moore bought Hadley Pottery, and then in 2018 Jerry Day purchased the business and opened up a stash of over 6000 pieces which date to the period when Mary Alice Hadley was still alive. In 2022, the business announced it would close, but later announced that the business would indeed stay open.

== Awards ==
Hadley Pottery was exhibited by the American Craftsmen's Educational Council in 1947, and at the Ceramic National Exhibit at the Syracuse Museum of Fine Arts. In 1952, Mary Alice Hadley received an award from the Museum of Modern Art's Good Design program and her winning design, "Brown Dot" (or "Hot Brown Fleck"), was exhibited in New York and Chicago.

== Collections ==
- Rose-Hulman Institute of Technology, Terre Haute, Indiana
- Speed Art Museum, Louisville, Kentucky
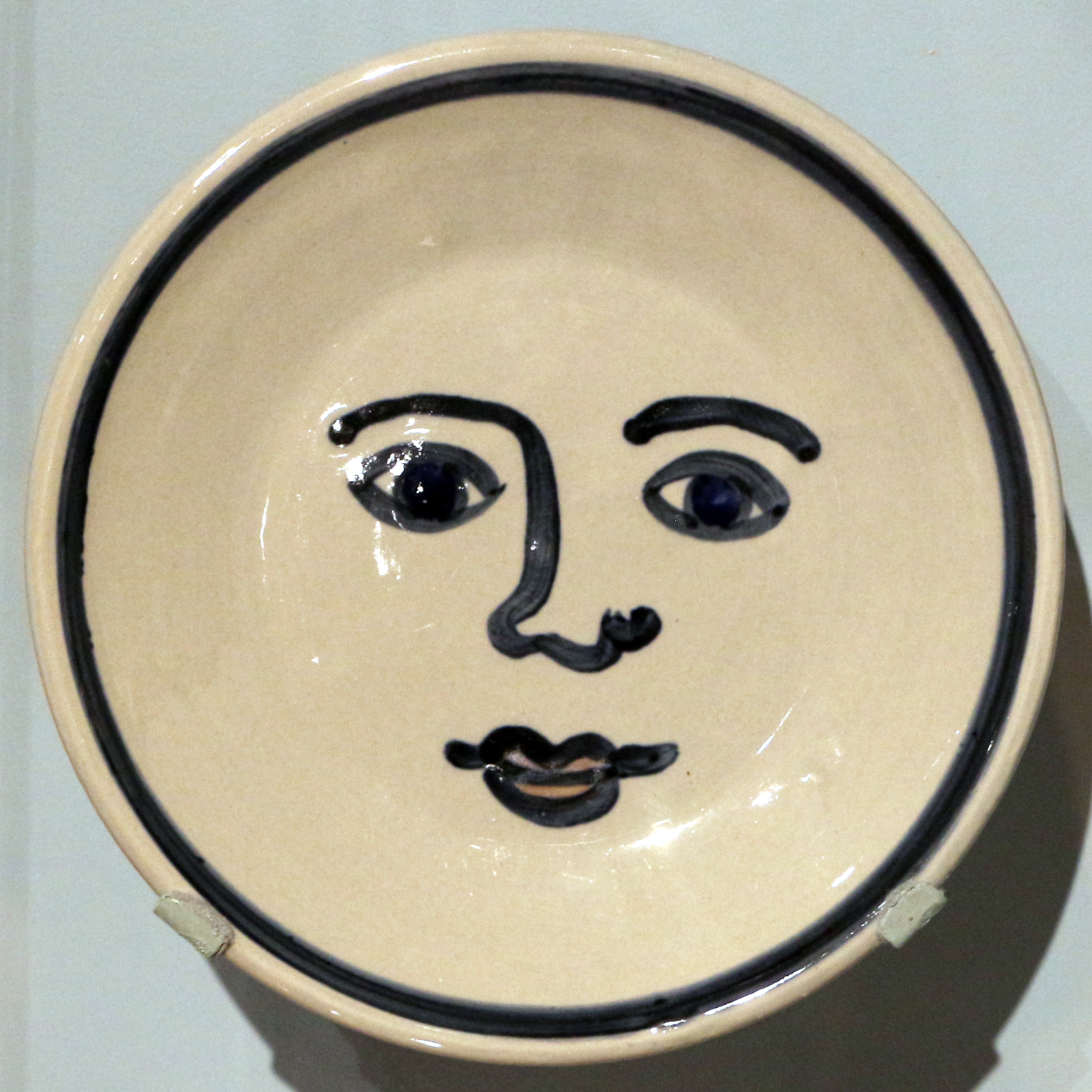
Mary Alice Hadley Ceramics at the Speed Art Museum

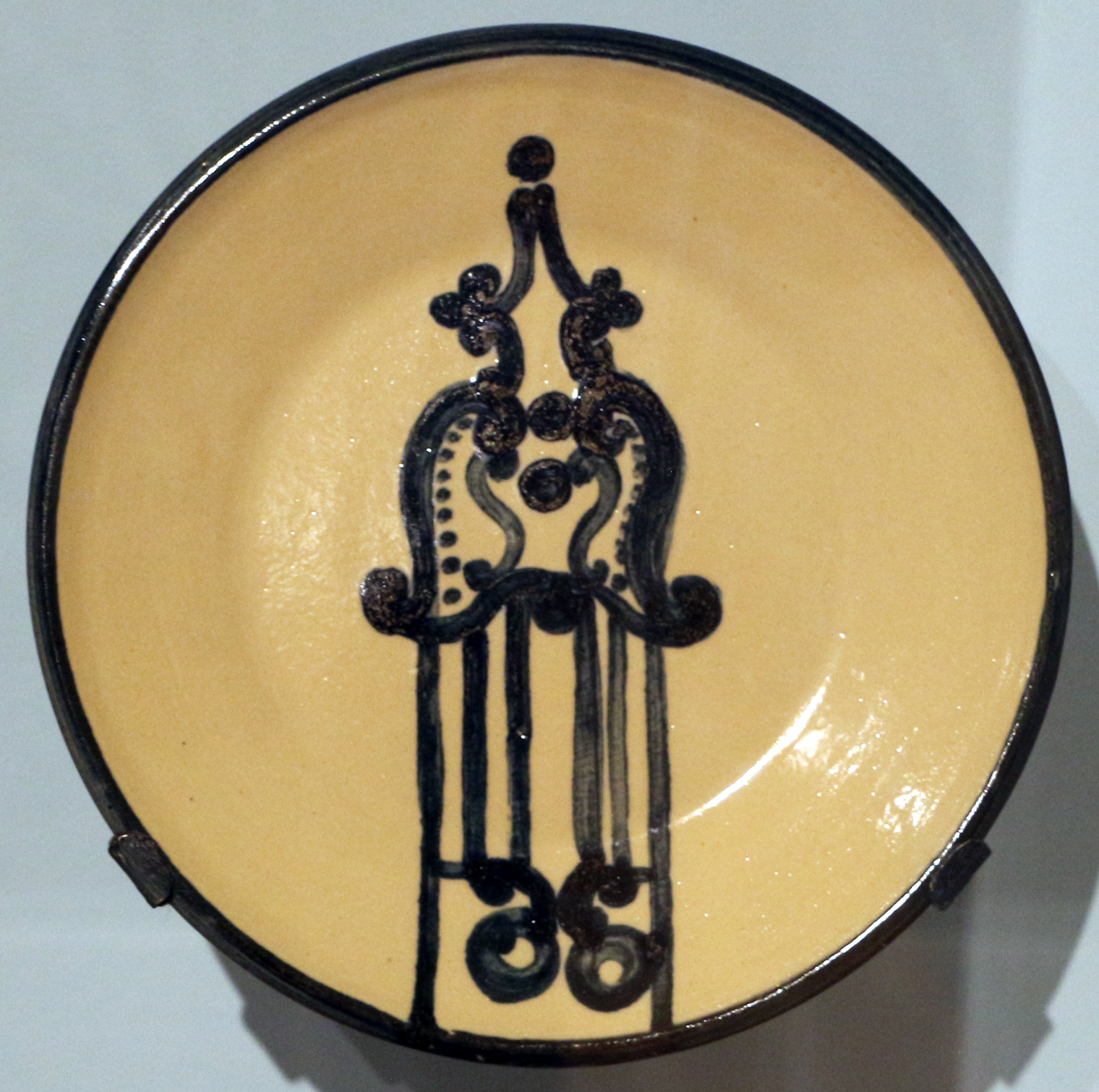
Mary Alice Hadley Ceramics at the Speed Art Museum

== See also ==
- Louisville Stoneware
