= Hedley Hill =

Coordinates: 54.771°N 1.767°W

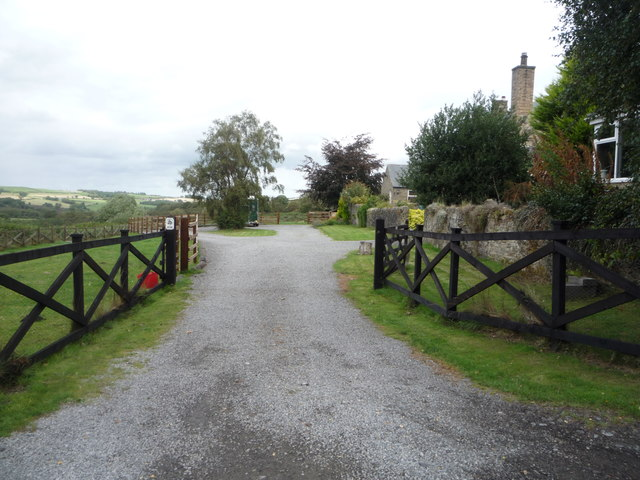

- Location within County Durham
- OS grid reference: NZ150417
- Civil parish: Cornsay; Hedleyhope
- Unitary authority: County Durham
- Ceremonial county: Durham
- Region: North East
- Country: England
- Sovereign state: United Kingdom
- Post town: DURHAM
- Postcode district: DH7
- Police: Durham
- Fire: County Durham and Darlington
- Ambulance: North East
- UK Parliament: North West Durham

Hedley Hill is a hamlet in the civil parishes of Cornsay and Hedleyhope, in County Durham, England. It is situated between Tow Law and Esh Winning.
