= Thomas Jefferson Hadley =

American politician and soldier

Thomas Hadley
- Born: 1728; Delaware, British America
- Died: 1 September 1781 (aged 52–53); North Carolina, United States
- Military career
- Allegiance: United States

Thomas Jefferson Hadley (1728 – September 1, 1781) was an American politician, settler, and soldier in the American Revolutionary War. He played a prominent role in the signing of North Carolina's constitution in 1776.

== Early life ==
Thomas Jefferson Hadley was born in 1728, in New Castle, Delaware to Joshua Hadley, a Quaker originally from King's County (now County Offaly), Ireland, and Mary Rowland of Chester County, Pennsylvania. Prior to travelling to the United States, his family were members of the Quaker Meetinghouse in Moate, County Westmeath.

== Career ==
Hadley travelled to North Carolina with his father c. 1759, first settling in Bladen County, with the family becoming early settlers of Cross Creek. Hadley and his family were members of the Cane Creek Quaker community in the Piedmont region of North Carolina, however following his participation in the American Revolutionary War, he was excommunicated. During the war, he reached the rank of captain. In 1776, he represented Campbellton at the North Carolina Constitutional Convention.

== Death and legacy ==
Captain Hadley was killed in 1781 by a party of Tories under the command of Col. Hector McNeill at his home on Cape Fear River, on the night following the Battle of Cross Creek. His grandson Joshua Hadley became a settler in Texas, after becoming a recipient of a league of land in Anderson County.
