= Big Daddy Carlos =

American impresario and musician

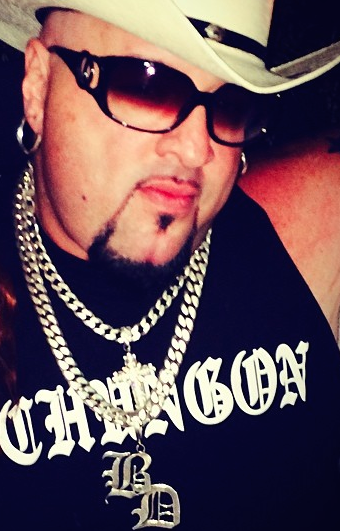
- Adley in 2014
- Born: Carlos Adley; September 20, 1968 (age 58); Inglewood, California
- Education: California State University, Fullerton
- Occupations: Impresario, music venue owner, restaurateur, promoter

Carlos Adley, more commonly known as Big Daddy Carlos, is an American Hollywood & Las Vegas nightlife impresario, music venue owner, restaurateur, promoter, and musician.

He is the owner of the Hollywood restaurant and lounge La Velvet Margarita Cantina and the Fremont Country Club in Downtown Las Vegas, and its adjoining rock "n" soul bar Backstage Bar & Billiards.

== Career ==
Adley got his start as a bouncer with a fake ID at Club Lingerie in the mid-1980s. In his late teens, he was running the door for David Lee Roth's Hollywood afterhours club, The Zero. Over the next couple of years he made the jump from doorman to DJ to venue promoter, while majoring in communications at Cal State Fullerton on a full athletic scholarship as the Titans football team's starting defensive nose guard.

In 1993, Adley chose the Hollywood nightlife industry over a professional football career. Adley went on to run Sweet Daddy Brown's, one of Los Angeles's largest afterhour gambling clubs, which he opened with casino heir Eddie Harrah. The club featured house and hip hop music, featuring talents such as Frankie Knuckles and DJ Lethal.

From 1994 through 1999, Adley was the promoter and house DJ at Johnny Depp's Viper Room while running numerous Hollywood venues, including The Opium Den, Blue, Dragonfly, Martini Lounge and Vertigo. In 1995, Adley formed Chickenhawk (1995–2000), (MCA Records, Capitol Records) a rock n' roll band in which he was the lead singer. He collaborated with Mickey Petralia on the soundtrack for the motion picture Gas Food Lodging. In 2000, Adley married nightclub owner and restaurateur Ava Berman and formed the F.O.M.M. Corporation. In 2001, the F.O.M.M. Corporation purchased real estate in what is now known as Hollywood's "Cahuenga Corridor" in the Entertainment District.

He and Berman opened the Mexican eatery, Velvet Margarita, on Cahuenga Boulevard on Cinco de Mayo 2004. Over time, the couple began to accumulate property in the area, taking advantage of the neighborhood's budding bar scene. The area later became known as "the Cahuenga Corridor". The restaurant hosts an annual charity gala on its anniversary to benefit an El Faro Orphanage in Tecate, Mexico. The eatery has been listed as an editor's pick on USA Today's 10best.com for lounges in Los Angeles and "Top Newcomer" in Zagat's 2005 guide to "LA Nightlife". It has also received letters of recognition from California Governor Arnold Schwarzenegger and Los Angeles Mayor Antonio Villaraigosafor outstanding achievement in the Hollywood business community.

In late 2008, Adley partnered with casino owner Terry Caudill (4 Queens & Binion's Gambling Hall and Hotel) to master-lease and remodel the historic and iconic Binions Hotel & Casino.

In May 2010, Terry Caudill and the Adleys leased the former Sears building at 601 Fremont in the Fremont East Entertainment District of Las Vegas from the city for 30 years with a development agreement stipulating the completion of construction by February 2013. The first phase included plans for a 10,000 square foot music venue called Fremont Country Club and a high-end sports bar/pool hall called Backstage Bar & Billiards. It was expected to cost $10 million with annual lease of $233,000. Michael Chugg was in charge of booking musical acts, such as DJ Scotty Boy and DJ Lethal of Limp Bizkit. Backstage Bar & Billiards lounge, also known as "Triple-B", opened near the end of 2012. The Fremont Country Club later opened in March 2013. They had planned to develop a mixed use hotel and apartment complex, including a radio station, at the site. However, these plans have yet to materialize. Adley and Terry Caudill announced in September 2019 that they had purchased the land and building located at 601 Fremont Street. The site included a 50,000-square-foot building and almost an acre of surface parking.

== Personal life ==
Adley was inducted into the California State University, Fullerton Athletic Hall of Fame as part of the 1985 Pacific Coast Athletic Association Conference Championship Football Team.

Adley is from Las Vegas.

=== Philanthropy ===
In 2015, Adley partnered with Ken Kragen and Michael Chugg and other environmentalists to form the Love The Sea charity organization. Its purpose is to facilitate Ocean Aid's music and educational festivals on a global format to bring awareness to the plastic pollution that is detrimentally affecting the world's ocean ecosystems. The first Ocean Aid festival was held April 30, 2017, and featured CeeLo Green, Bootsy Collins and Maxi Priest as headliners. The event was broadcast live statewide on KFVE-TV.
