= Hedley (surname) =

Hedley is a surname. Notable people with the surname include:

- Charles Hedley (1862–1926), malacologist from England and then Australia, winner of the Clarke Award
- Charles Hedley (rugby league) (1881–1942), Australian rugby footballer
- Coote Hedley (1865–1937), English army officer and amateur cricketer
- Evalena Fryer Hedley (1865-1943), American journalist, editor, and author
- Graeme Hedley (born 1957), English footballer
- Jack Hedley (1929–2021), British actor
- John Cuthbert Hedley (1837–1915), British writer and bishop
- John Herbert Hedley (1887–1977), British soldier
- John Prescott Hedley (1876-1957), British physician
- Joseph Hedley (1749/50–1826), English quilter and murder victim
- Lou Hedley (born 1993), Australian American football player
- Robert Hedley (1857–1884), English footballer
- Thomas Hedley (born 1942/1943), British publisher
- William Hedley (1779–1843), British industrial engineer

Fictional characters

- Roland Hedley, reporter in the comic strip Doonesbury

== See also ==
- Headlee
- Headley (surname)
