= Hadley Junior High School =

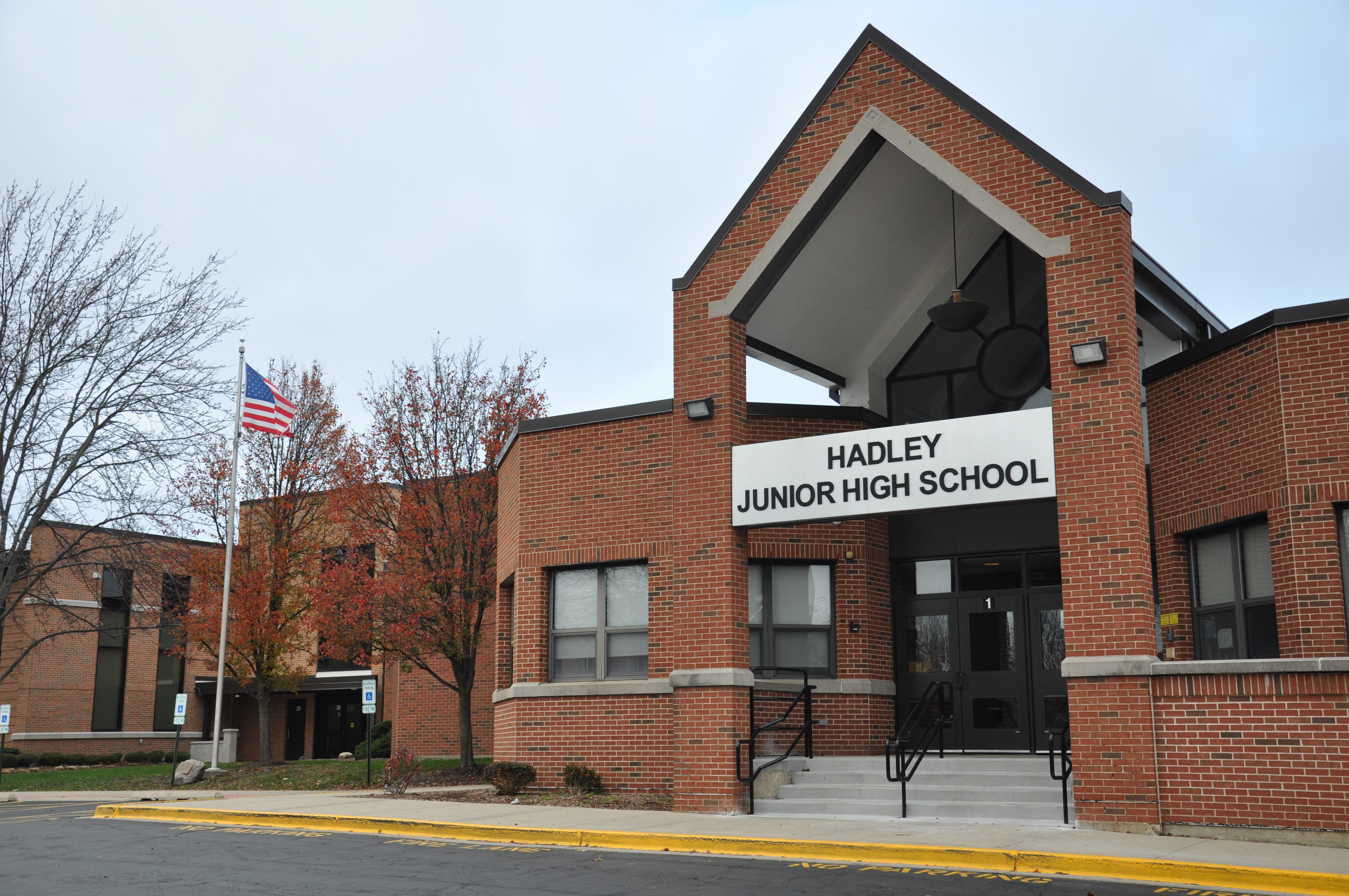

Location
- 240 Hawthorne Boulevard; Glen Ellyn, Illinois 60137; United States; 41°52′54″N 88°04′50″W

Information
- School type: Public, Middle school
- Opened: 1956
- School district: Glen Ellyn SD 41
- Principal: Rebecca Gabrenya
- Faculty: 83
- Grades: 6–8
- Enrollment: 1,148 (2009)
- Campus: Suburban
- Colors: Black and red
- Mascot: Wildcat
- Feeder to: Glenbard West High School
- Information: 630-790-6450
- Website: hadley.d41.org

Hadley Junior High is located in Glen Ellyn, a western suburb of Chicago, Illinois. Named for former school superintendent, William M. Hadley, the school is the main middle school that feeds into Glenbard West High School and is the only middle school in District 41, which is made up of Hadley and four elementary schools: Benjamin Franklin, Lincoln, Churchill, and Forest Glen.

== Awards ==
Hadley Jr. High has an award-winning music program, with both the Symphonic Band and String Orchestra winning highest honors at the Illinois Grade School Music Association State Contest in 1999, 2006 and 2007. 2006 marked the 13th year that the Hadley Symphonic Band had been invited to perform at the Illinois Superstate Concert Festival at the University of Illinois at Urbana-Champaign. For the Hadley String Orchestra, 2009 marked the 16th year they have been directed under Mrs. Georgia Alemis, and the 19th year in a row they have won the highest honors at state contest. 2009 also marks the retirement of Band Director Don Crews. Since 2004, Hadley has had two students place in the top 10 in the Illinois State Geography Bee with one qualifying three-times and one qualifying once. The chorus has also won several prizes at state competitions. In 2019, Hadley Jr. High was awarded the title of an Illinois Horizon Schools to Watch.

== "Tulips for Cancer" ==
Since 2003, Hadley's spring tulips located near its front entrance have bloomed in the form of a pink ribbon. The bulbs were planted in support of efforts to fight breast cancer by community volunteer Jim Bourke in conjunction with eighth grade Team X Class of '04.

== Basketball ==
Hadley's 7th grade boys' basketball team was undefeated, 24-0, during the 2006-07 season. Hadley's 8th grade boys' basketball team was nearly undefeated in the 2007-2008 season, going 23-1 and winning the championship.
