= William M. Hadley =

- Born: William Moore Hadley; March 21, 1917; Summerdale, Alabama, U.S.
- Died: June 29, 1992 (aged 75); Magnolia Springs, Alabama, U.S.
- Education: University of Alabama
- Occupations: Teacher; principal; superintendent

William Moore Hadley (March 21, 1917 – June 29, 1992) was an American educator and school superintendent in active Alabama, Texas and Illinois.

== Early life and education ==
Hadley, the youngest child of Joseph William Hadley and Pauline Elizabeth Simmons Hadley, was born in Summerdale, Alabama, on March 21, 1917. He earned a teaching credential at Daphne State Normal School in Baldwin County, Alabama. He earned a bachelor's degree and a master's degree from the University of Alabama. He completed doctoral studies at Teachers College, Columbia University in 1951.

== Career ==
Hadley began his teaching career in Baldwin County. In 1942, he joined the Merchant Marines and served until the end of World War II. At the end of the war, he resumed his teaching career. In 1949, he accepted a position as State Supervisor of Education based in Montgomery, Alabama, in 1949. He taught at Teachers College, Columbia University while he was a doctoral student there.

In 1951 he accepted an associate professorship at the University of Texas at Austin. In the 1950s he was superintendent of schools in Alice, Texas, and Midland, Texas. He was elected president of the Gulf Coast Administrators Association while he was working in Texas.

The University of Alabama offered William the opportunity to make a study of the professional teaching personnel in Jefferson County, Alabama (including the city of Birmingham). His last professional post was as superintendent of schools in Glen Ellyn, Illinois, from 1956 until he retired in 1974. He was honored at his retirement by having an annual scholarship given in his name by the Glen Ellyn schools, and an experimental middle school named in his honor, William M. Hadley School, located in Glen Ellyn.

== Personal life ==
Hadley married fellow educator Wilma (Polly) Funchess of Mobile, Alabama. The Hadleys had three children. They moved to their retirement home in Magnolia Springs, Alabama, on July 1, 1974, where he lived until his death on June 29, 1992.
