= Hadley Township, Pike County, Illinois =

Coordinates: 39°42′24″N 90°58′03″W

Hadley Township
- Township
- Location in Pike County

- Pike County's location in Illinois
- Country: United States
- State: Illinois
- County: Pike
- Established: November 8, 1853

Area
  - Total: 36.86 sq mi (95.5 km^{2})
  - Land: 36.84 sq mi (95.4 km^{2})
  - Water: 0.02 sq mi (0.052 km^{2}) 0.05%

Population (2010)
  - Estimate (2016): 255
  - Density: 7.1/sq mi (2.7/km^{2})
- Time zone: UTC-6 (CST)
  - Summer (DST): UTC-5 (CDT)
- FIPS code: 17-149-32070

Hadley Township (/ˈhædliː/, HAD-lee) is located in Pike County, Illinois. As of the 2010 census, its population was 262 and it contained 130 housing units.

== Geography ==
According to the 2010 census, the township has a total area of 36.86 square miles (95.5 km^{2}), of which 36.84 square miles (95.4 km^{2}) (or 99.95%) is land and 0.02 square miles (0.052 km^{2}) (or 0.05%) is water.

== Demographics ==
Historical population
Census	Pop.	Note	%±
2016 (est.)	255
U.S. Decennial Census
