= Len Hadley =

American businessman

Len Hadley is an American businessman. He retired as the CEO of the Maytag Corporation in Newton, Iowa in 1999. He was a member of the firm's Board of Directors from 1985 to 1999. He returned to Maytag as president and CEO from November 2000 to June 2001.

Born in Earlham, Iowa, Hadley received his BSc degree in accounting from the University of Iowa in 1958, after which he studied law for a year. Prior to enrolling at Iowa, Hadley attended Drake University and served in the Army Signal Corps.

Hadley joined Maytag as a cost accountant in 1959 and held a number of financial positions before becoming assistant controller in 1975. He was named vice president of corporate planning in 1979 and president of the Maytag Company in 1986. He was promoted to executive vice president of the corporation in 1989. In that same year, he became head of the appliance group and was named chief operating officer in February 1991 and CEO in April 1992. He assumed the additional role of chairman in December 1992.

He has served as a director for numerous companies including Deere & Company, Snap-on Inc., H-Power, and Norwest Bank of Iowa.

He is a member of the University of Iowa Foundation Board of Directors and the UI Presidents Club, and he has received the UI Distinguished Alumni Achievement Award (1995), the Department of Accounting Distinguished Alumni Award, and the Tippie College of Business's Oscar C. Schmidt Leadership Award (1996). He was elected to the Iowa Business Hall of Fame in 1997.

== Photos ==
- Maytag HQ

== See also ==
- Marketing
- Maytag Corporation
- The Hoover Company
