= John Prescott Hedley =

John Prescott Hedley (1876–1957) FRCS, FRCP, FRCOG was a British surgeon and foundation fellow of the Royal College of Obstetricians and Gynaecologists.
