= Hedley (given name) =

Hedley is a masculine given name which may refer to:

People:

- Hedley Atkins (1905–1983), British professor of surgery and President of the Royal College of Surgeons
- Hedley Blackmore (1901–1992), Australian rules footballer
- Hedley Bull (1932–1985), Australian and British scholar of international relations
- Hedley Francis Gregory Bridges (1902–1947), Canadian politician
- Hedley Burrows (1887–1983), Anglican cleric, Dean of Hereford
- Hedley Donovan (1914–1990), editor-in-chief of Time, Inc.
- Hedley David Farquhar (politician) (1927–2009), Australian politician
- Hedley Fitton (1859–1929), English engraver and printmaker
- Hedley Hazelden (1915–2001), British civilian test pilot and Second World War RAF squadron leader
- Hedley Hope-Nicholson (1888–1969), English barrister and littérateur
- Hedley Howarth (1943–2008), New Zealand international cricketer
- Hedley Kett (1913–2014), British Second World War submarine commander
- Hedley Marston (1900–1965), Australian biochemist
- Hedley Vicars Short, Canadian Anglican Bishop of Saskatchewan (1970–1985)
- Hedley Thomas, Australian investigative journalist and author
- Hedley Verity (1905–1943), English cricketer
- Hedley Webster (1880–1954), Irish Anglican Bishop of Killaloe, Kilfenora, Clonfert and Kilmacduagh
- Hedley Woodhouse (1920–1984), Canadian jockey

== Fictional characters ==
- Hedley Lamarr, villain of the film Blazing Saddles
