= Arthur Hadley (footballer) =

English footballer

Personal information
- Full name: Arthur Hadley
- Date of birth: 5 May 1876
- Place of birth: Reading, Berkshire, England
- Date of death: 1963 (aged 86–87)
- Position: Winger

Senior career*
| Years | Team | Apps | (Gls) |
| 1894–1895 | Reading Abbey | | |
| 1895–1898 | Reading | | |
| 1898–1902 | Notts County | 76 | (22) |
| 1902–1904 | Leicester Fosse | 59 | (4) |
| 1904–1905 | Arnold | | |
| 1905–1906 | Leicester Fosse | 5 | (0) |
| 1906–1907 | Notts County | 0 | (0) |
| Total | | 140 | (26) |
- * Club domestic league appearances and goals

Arthur Hadley (5 May 1876–1963) was an English footballer who played in the Football League for Leicester Fosse and Notts County.
