= Willing to Kill: The Texas Cheerleader Story =

- Genre: Drama; Thriller
- Written by: Alan Hines
- Directed by: David Greene
- Starring: Lesley Ann Warren
- Music by: Peter Manning Robinson
- Country of origin: United States
- Original language: English

Production
- Executive producers: Stockton Briggle; David J. Eagle; Sally Young
- Producers: James G. Hirsch; Robert A. Papazian; Carol Starr Schneider; Alan Stepp
- Production locations: Los Angeles Harbor, Wilmington, Los Angeles, California; Church of the Angels - 1100 Avenue 64, Pasadena, California
- Cinematography: Stevan Larner
- Editor: Daniel T. Cahn
- Running time: 120 minutes
- Production companies: David Eagle Productions; Papazian-Hirsch Entertainment International; Stockton Briggle

Original release
- Network: ABC
- Release: November 8, 1992

Willing to Kill: The Texas Cheerleader Story is a 1992 American television film directed by David Greene. It stars Lesley Ann Warren and Tess Harper. It was nominated for a Young Artist Award in 1993.

It preceded, but was ultimately overshadowed by, the bigger-budgeted and more star-powered version of the "true story", The Positively True Adventures of the Alleged Texas Cheerleader-Murdering Mom.

== Cast ==
- Lesley Ann Warren as Wanda Holloway
- Tess Harper as Verna Heath
- Dennis Christopher as Randy
- Olivia Burnette as Shanna Harper
- Lauren Woodland as Amber Heath
- Joanna Miles as Joyce
- William Forsythe as Terry Harper
