= Time Out (2001 film) =

2001 film by Laurent Cantet

- Theatrical release poster
- Directed by: Laurent Cantet
- Written by: Robin Campillo; Laurent Cantet
- Produced by: Caroline Benjo
- Starring: Aurélien Recoing; Karin Viard
- Cinematography: Pierre Milon
- Edited by: Robin Campillo; Stephanie Leger
- Music by: Jocelyn Pook
- Distributed by: Haut et Court
- Release dates: 4 September 2001 (Venice); 14 November 2001 (France)
- Running time: 134 minutes
- Country: France
- Language: French
- Budget: $3 million
- Box office: $1.2 million

Time Out (French: L'Emploi du temps or 'Le Vendu') is a 2001 French drama film directed by Laurent Cantet and starring Aurélien Recoing and Karin Viard. The film is loosely based on the life story of Jean-Claude Romand (though without the criminal element), and it focuses on one of Cantet's favorite subjects: a man's relationship with his job. The film received considerable attention internationally and was shown at the Venice Film Festival and Toronto International Film Festival. It was one of the independent films to be featured at the New York Film Festival.

== Plot ==
The film tells the story of Vincent, a middle-aged man fired after spending more than 11 years working for a prestigious consulting firm. Unable to admit to his family that he has been fired, the unemployed former executive continues to pretend he goes to the office daily. In reality, Vincent spends his time aimlessly driving the highways of France and Switzerland, reading newspapers, or sleeping in his car.

As time progresses, Vincent invents more and more elaborate lies, throwing himself into a vicious spiral of deceit. To sustain his bourgeois lifestyle, Vincent sets up a Ponzi scheme and is eventually enlisted into smuggling by career thief Jean-Michel. Murielle, Vincent's wife, after discovering her husband's "life of lies", attempts to bring him back into the realm of reality.

== Cast ==
- Aurélien Recoing as Vincent
- Karin Viard as Muriel
- Serge Livrozet as Jean-Michel
- Jean-Pierre Mangeot as Father
- Monique Mangeot as Mother
- Didier Perez as Philippe
- Philippe Jouannet as Human Resources Director

== Reception ==
Time Out was acclaimed by critics. Review aggregation website Rotten Tomatoes reported an approval rating of 96%, based on 82 reviews, with an average rating of 8/10. The consensus reads, "A haunting psychological drama, Time Out takes a penetrating look at the angst of the modern worker." At Metacritic, which assigns a rating out of 100 to reviews from mainstream critics, the film received an average score of 88, based on 30 reviews, indicating "universal acclaim".

The film was placed at 99 on Slant Magazines best films of the 2000s, number 9 of The Guardian's best films of the noughties, and number 11 at The A.V. Club's top 50 films of the 2000s.

== Accolades ==
Award / Film Festival	Category	Recipients and nominees	Result
Boston Society of Film Critics Awards	Best Foreign Language Film		2nd place
European Film Awards	Best Screenwriter	Laurent Cantet and Robin Campillo	Nominated
Independent Spirit Awards	Best International Film		Nominated
National Society of Film Critics Awards	Best Foreign Language Film		3rd place
National Society of Film Critics Awards	Best Actor	Aurélien Recoing	3rd place
New York Film Critics Circle Awards	Best Foreign Language Film		Runner-up
Venice International Film Festival	Don Quixote Award		Won
Vienna International Film Festival	FIPRESCI Prize		Won

== American remake ==
Speaking in 2022 about his collaboration and working relationship with Christian Bale, Scott Cooper teased several potential projects him and the actor were considering pursuing, including a "reimagining" he had long wanted to make of the film. Cooper then confirmed on an episode of WTF with Marc Maron that Bale was intent on starring. However, in March 2026, it was revealed that Adam Sandler would take over for Bale. Netflix will distribute the film.
