= Secretary (2002 film) =

Film by Steven Shainberg

- Theatrical release poster
- Directed by: Steven Shainberg
- Screenplay by: Erin Cressida Wilson
- Story by: Steven Shainberg; Erin Cressida Wilson
- Based on: "Secretary" by Mary Gaitskill
- Produced by: Andrew Fierberg; Amy Hobby; Steven Shainberg
- Starring: James Spader; Maggie Gyllenhaal; Jeremy Davies; Patrick Bauchau; Stephen McHattie; Lesley Ann Warren
- Cinematography: Steven Fierberg
- Edited by: Pam Wise
- Music by: Angelo Badalamenti
- Production companies: Double A Films; The Slough Pond Company; TwoPoundBag Productions
- Distributed by: Lions Gate Films
- Release dates: January 11, 2002 (Sundance); September 20, 2002 (United States)
- Running time: 107 minutes
- Country: United States
- Language: English
- Budget: $4 million
- Box office: $9.3 million

Secretary is a 2002 American erotic romantic comedy-drama film directed by Steven Shainberg from a screenplay by Erin Cressida Wilson, based on the 1988 short story of the same name by Mary Gaitskill. Starring Maggie Gyllenhaal and James Spader, the film explores the intense relationship between a dominant lawyer and his submissive secretary, who indulge in various types of BDSM activities such as erotic spanking and petplay.

== Plot ==
In Clermont, Florida, Lee Holloway is the youngest daughter of a dysfunctional family, consisting of an alcoholic and abusive father, an overbearing mother, who constantly argues with Lee's father over his drinking, and her newly married sister, with she and her husband moving into the pool house in the backyard of their family home. After having been committed to a mental hospital following an extreme incident of self-harm, she attempts to readjust to normal life.

Lee, determined to keep herself busy to avoid potential relapse, becomes proficient in typing and applies for a job as a secretary for E. Edward Grey, an eccentric yet demanding attorney in a strained relationship with his domineering ex-wife Trisha. Grey explains she is overqualified for the job, having scored higher than anyone he has ever interviewed, and warns her that it is "very dull work" as they only use typewriters. Lee, however, agrees to work under these conditions, claiming she "likes dull work", confusing and intriguing Grey.

Though at first, Grey keeps an awkward, professional distance from Lee, he is shown to be sexually aroused by her obedient behavior, becoming jealous when he sees her on a date with her family friend Peter and appears to be highly irritated by Lee's typos and other clerical errors. When Grey discovers her propensity for self-harm, he eventually confronts her and demands that she never hurt herself again. One day, Grey makes her bend over his desk and spanks her after she continues to make typing errors; Lee finds herself excited by the ordeal.

The two soon embark on a BDSM relationship. Lee experiences a sexual and personal awakening through the sadomasochistic sexual encounters with Grey and falls deeply in love with him. Conversely, Grey displays insecurity concerning his feelings for Lee, as well as shame and disgust over his sexual habits. He begins to withdraw from her, despite her intentionally continuing to make typing errors in the hopes of receiving more corporal punishment.

During this period of exploration with Grey, Lee also attempts to have a more conventional relationship with Peter. She engages in lukewarm sex with him, during which he is confused by her desire to be spanked.

After Lee sends Grey an envelope with a worm in it, he bends her over his desk and makes her remove her skirt and underwear, then masturbates behind her and ejaculates onto the back of her blouse. Lee then goes into the restroom, where she pleasures herself in one of the stalls whilst looking at one of her own typos and fantasizing about performing fellatio on Grey. Feeling disgusted by his actions, Grey fires Lee out of shame.

Peter later proposes to Lee, who reluctantly accepts. While trying on her wedding gown, she suddenly flees and runs to Grey's office to declare her love for him. Grey, still uncertain about their relationship, tests Lee by commanding her to sit in his chair without moving her hands or feet until he returns, which she willingly agrees to do. Peter locates Lee and pushes her out of the chair, but she fends him off and returns to the desk as Grey secretly watches from afar, impressed by Lee's dedication.

Hours pass as several family members and friends individually visit Lee to alternately attempt to dissuade or encourage her. Her refusal to leave the office, believed to be a hunger strike, draws media attention. Three days later, Grey returns to the office and takes Lee upstairs, where he bathes and feeds her. The pair marry and happily continue their dominant–submissive relationship.

== Cast ==
- James Spader as E. Edward Grey
- Maggie Gyllenhaal as Lee Holloway
- Jeremy Davies as Peter
- Patrick Bauchau as Dr. Twardon
- Stephen McHattie as Burt Holloway
- Oz Perkins as Jonathan
- Jessica Tuck as Tricia O'Connor
- Amy Locane as Lee's sister
- Lesley Ann Warren as Joan Holloway
- Mary Joy as Sylvia
- Michael Mantell as Stewart
- Sabrina Grdevich as Allison
- Lily Knight as Paralegal
- Lacey Kohl as Louisa
- Julene Renee as Jessica
- Ezra Buzzington as typing teacher

== Production ==
Many changes were made from Mary Gaitskill's original short story, which was significantly expanded and given greater depth to be made into a feature-length film. Lines of dialogue were changed; Lee's statement "I'm so stupid" became the fantasy-sequence cry "I'm your secretary", which the director thought far more "celebratory". Additionally, the ending of the story was changed to give a more positive outcome to the relationship. Steven Shainberg stated that he wished to show that BDSM relationships can be normal and was inspired by the film My Beautiful Laundrette, which he feels normalized gay relationships for audiences in the 1980s.

A central component to the film, the office spaces of Edward and Lee, took form after two years of planning by Shainberg and production designer Amy Danger, who had collaborated with Shainberg on several projects. The desire to have the office feel homemade and express Edward's interest in the growing of plants led Danger to juxtapose a natural decor in the office with a predominantly artificial outside world.

Speaking of her choices, Danger compares the office with the rest of the film's locations: "All the materials I used [in the office] were natural: natural wood, bamboo, ironwork ... If I wasn't using natural materials, it was natural colors, like [in] the botanical wallpaper." In contrast, "everything [in the larger world] was fake ... I covered Lee's house in plastic sheeting, and used artificial, manufactured colors." Although the interior sets were carefully constructed, the filmmakers did face some location-related challenges.

Notably, in one instance the filmmakers accidentally obtained shooting rights for the wrong park. Gyllenhaal encouraged them to hastily shoot the required park scene anyway, without permission, while crew members distracted the local police.

Speaking about Secretary's tone and atmosphere, Danger says, "With this S&M material, we could go into a dark place... Steve and I wanted the total opposite: that the nature of this relationship freed [the characters] to be their natural selves." Because of this atmosphere, Danger says, "Everybody kept saying, 'When are we going back to the office?' It was funny, because the rooms weren't any smaller in the house, and it wasn't any more difficult to shoot. It was because you wanted to be in that space."

=== Filming ===
Despite being set in Florida, filming took place in Los Angeles.

== Release ==
=== Theatrical ===
The film premiered at the 2002 Sundance Film Festival, where it won a Special Jury Prize Award for Originality for Steven Shainberg. It was subsequently acquired by Lions Gate Films for theatrical release. It also went on to screen at the Toronto International Film Festival later that year. The film opened in limited release in the United States on September 20, 2002, as well as in various foreign markets in 2003 and 2004.

=== Home media ===
The film's region 1 DVD was released on April 1, 2003. In the UK, a version by Tartan Video was released on January 5, 2004, followed by a budget edition by Prism Leisure on February 7, 2005. A Blu-ray Disc was released on October 4, 2010.

Special features on the Blu-ray include the film's trailer and TV spots, cast and director interviews, a behind-the-scenes documentary, cast and director "Curricula Vitae" and an audio commentary by director Steven Shainberg and writer Erin Cressida Wilson.

== Reception ==
=== Critical response ===
On the review aggregator website Rotten Tomatoes, 78% of 157 critics' reviews are positive, with an average rating of 7/10. The website's consensus reads: "Maggie Gyllenhaal impresses in this romantic comedy with a kinky twist." Metacritic, which uses a weighted average, assigned the film a score of 63 out of 100, based on 39 critics, indicating "generally favorable" reviews.

Many critics noted the film's original take on themes of sadomasochism, with Roger Ebert saying that the film "approaches the tricky subject ... with a stealthy tread, avoiding the dangers of making it either too offensive, or too funny". Ain't It Cool News commented: "Perhaps there is something bold about saying that pain can bring healing as long as it's applied by the right hand, but even that seems obvious and even normal thanks to Gyllenhaal."

=== Box office ===
The film grossed $4.1 million in the United States and Canada, and $9.3 million worldwide.

=== Controversy ===
The film's exploration of a BDSM romantic relationship and Spader's character bearing the last name "Grey" have drawn comparisons to the Fifty Shades of Grey franchise, with some suspecting the former inspired the E. L. James series.

The film was criticized for idealizing a potentially abusive relationship, which begins without explicit consent, by Emily Kenway in LitHub and Adele Melander-Dayton in PopMatters.

== Accolades ==
Secretary was nominated for a number of awards and won several, with numerous wins for Maggie Gyllenhaal's breakthrough performance.

Award	Category	Nominee(s)	Result
Artios Awards	Outstanding Achievement in Feature Film Casting – Independent	Ellen Parks	Won
Boston Society of Film Critics Awards	Best Actress	Maggie Gyllenhaal	Won
British Independent Film Awards	Best Foreign Independent Film		Nominated
Central Ohio Film Critics Association Awards	Best Actress	Maggie Gyllenhaal	Won
Chicago Film Critics Association Awards	Most Promising Performer	Maggie Gyllenhaal (also for Adaptation and Confessions of a Dangerous Mind)	Won
Chlotrudis Awards	Best Actor	James Spader	Nominated
Chlotrudis Awards	Best Actress	Maggie Gyllenhaal	Nominated
Chlotrudis Awards	Best Adapted Screenplay	Erin Cressida Wilson and Steven Shainberg	Nominated
Deauville American Film Festival	Grand Prix	Steven Shainberg	Nominated
Empire Awards	Best Actress	Maggie Gyllenhaal	Nominated
Fantasporto	Best Actress (Directors' Week Award)	Maggie Gyllenhaal	Won
Florida Film Critics Circle Awards	Pauline Kael Breakout Award	Maggie Gyllenhaal	Won
Florida Film Critics Circle Awards	Golden Orange for Outstanding Contribution to Film	Amy Hobby (also for Thirteen Conversations About One Thing) (Note: For consistent excellence and adventurousness in film production.)	Won
Gold Derby Awards	Best Breakthrough Performance	Maggie Gyllenhaal	Nominated
Golden Globe Awards	Best Actress in a Motion Picture – Musical or Comedy	Maggie Gyllenhaal	Nominated
Golden Trailer Awards	Best Romance		Won
Golden Trailer Awards	Trashiest		Nominated
Gotham Independent Film Awards	Breakthrough Performer	Maggie Gyllenhaal	Won
Independent Spirit Awards	Best Feature		Nominated
Independent Spirit Awards	Best Female Lead	Maggie Gyllenhaal	Nominated
Independent Spirit Awards	Best First Screenplay	Erin Cressida Wilson	Won
Las Vegas Film Critics Society Awards	Best Actress	Maggie Gyllenhaal	Nominated
Locarno International Film Festival	Golden Leopard	Steven Shainberg	Nominated
MTV Movie Awards	Best Breakthrough Female Performance	Maggie Gyllenhaal	Nominated
National Board of Review Awards	Breakthrough Performance – Female	Maggie Gyllenhaal	Won
National Society of Film Critics Awards	Best Actress	Maggie Gyllenhaal	2nd Place
Online Film & Television Association Awards	Best Breakthrough Performance: Female	Maggie Gyllenhaal	Won (Note: Tied with Nia Vardalos for My Big Fat Greek Wedding.)
Online Film Critics Society Awards	Best Actress	Maggie Gyllenhaal	Nominated
Online Film Critics Society Awards	Best Breakthrough Performance	Maggie Gyllenhaal	Won
Paris Film Festival	Grand Prix	Steven Shainberg	Nominated
Paris Film Festival	Best Actress	Maggie Gyllenhaal	Won
Phoenix Film Critics Society Awards	Best Actress in a Leading Role	Maggie Gyllenhaal	Nominated
Phoenix Film Critics Society Awards	Best Newcomer	Maggie Gyllenhaal	Nominated
San Diego Film Critics Society Awards	Best Actress	Maggie Gyllenhaal	Nominated
Satellite Awards	Best Actress in a Motion Picture – Musical or Comedy	Maggie Gyllenhaal	Nominated
Sundance Film Festival	Grand Jury Prize – Dramatic	Steven Shainberg	Nominated
Sundance Film Festival	Special Jury Prize – Originality	Steven Shainberg	Won
Toronto Film Critics Association Awards	Best Actress	Maggie Gyllenhaal	Runner-up
Vancouver Film Critics Circle Awards	Best Actress	Maggie Gyllenhaal	Nominated
Village Voice Film Poll	Best Lead Performance	Maggie Gyllenhaal	6th Place
Washington D.C. Area Film Critics Association Awards	Best Actress	Maggie Gyllenhaal	Runner-up

== Soundtrack ==
The film's soundtrack album was released on CD on October 8, 2002, with an MP3 download version released on July 11, 2006. The soundtrack album contains Angelo Badalamenti's score as well as two songs that were notably featured over erotic montages in the film: Leonard Cohen's "I'm Your Man" and Lizzie West's "Chariots Rise".

The song "Chariots Rise" was changed slightly for the film, with the lyric "what a fool am I, to fall so in love" changed to "what grace have I, to fall so in love".

Track listing

All tracks by Angelo Badalamenti unless otherwise stated.

1. "I'm Your Man" – Leonard Cohen
2. "Main Title"
3. "Feelin' Free"
4. "Snow Dome Dreams"
5. "Bathing Blossom"
6. "Seeing Scars"
7. "Loving to Obey"
8. "Office Obligations"
9. "The Loving Tree"
10. "Orchids"
11. "Secretary's Secrets"
12. "Chariots Rise" – Lizzie West

== See also ==
- Sadism and masochism in fiction
- Nudity in film

== Bibliography ==
- Wilson, Erin Cressida (2003). Secretary: A Screenplay. Brooklyn, NY: Soft Skull Press. ISBN 1887128190. OCLC 51871078.
