= Baja Oklahoma =

1988 television film directed by Bobby Roth

- Genre: Comedy; Drama; Music; Romance
- Based on: Baja Oklahoma by Dan Jenkins
- Written by: Bobby Roth
- Teleplay by: Dan Jenkins
- Directed by: Bobby Roth
- Starring: Willie Nelson; Lesley Ann Warren; Peter Coyote; Swoosie Kurtz; Julia Roberts
- Music by: Stanley Myers
- Country of origin: United States
- Original language: English

Production
- Executive producer: Hunt Lowry
- Production location: Fort Worth, Texas
- Cinematography: Michael Ballhaus
- Running time: 105 minutes
- Production companies: HBO Pictures; Rastar Productions

Original release
- Network: HBO
- Release: February 20, 1988

Baja Oklahoma is a 1988 American made-for-television comedy-drama film by HBO Original Film starring Lesley Ann Warren. Written by director Bobby Roth and novelist Dan Jenkins, based on Jenkins's 1982 novel with the same title, it also stars Peter Coyote, Swoosie Kurtz, and Julia Roberts. The title song was written by Jenkins and Willie Nelson, who appears as himself near the end of the film to sing it with Warren.

== Plot ==
Juanita Hutchins has dreams of becoming a country-western music songwriter, but she works at a bar in the meantime.

== Cast ==
- Lesley Ann Warren as Juanita Hutchins
- Peter Coyote as "Slick" Henderson
- Swoosie Kurtz as Doris Steadman
- Julia Roberts as Candy Hutchins
- Billy Vera as Lonnie Slocum
- Anthony Zerbe as Ole Jeemy Williams
- William Forsythe as Tommy Earl Browner
- Willie Nelson as Himself
- Bruce Abbott as Dove Christian
- Carmen Argenziano as Roy Simmons
- Paul Bartel as Minister
- Jordan Charney as Beecher Perry
- Carole Davis as Tina Busher (credited as Carole Raphaelle Davis)
- Linda Dona as Martha Healy
- Rhonda Dotson as Kathy
- Emmylou Harris as Herself
- John M. Jackson as Lee Steadman
- Alice Krige as Patsy Cline
- John Mayall as Himself
- Kit McDonough as Sheila Browner
- Rob Nilsson as Chuck
- Walter Olkewicz as Private Eye
- Annie O'Neill as Bonnie
- Cyril O'Reilly as Weldon Taylor
- Dennis Redfield as Vern Sandler
- Susannah Woodside as Esther

== Other ==
"Baja Oklahoma" is a nickname for Texas.
