= Transit (2012 film) =

2012 film by Antonio Negret

- Theatrical release poster
- Directed by: Antonio Negret
- Written by: Michael Gilvary
- Produced by: Courtney Solomon; Moshe Diamant
- Starring: Jim Caviezel; James Frain; Diora Baird; Elisabeth Röhm; Ryan Donowho; Sterling Knight; Harold Perrineau; Jake Cherry
- Cinematography: Yaron Levy
- Edited by: William Yeh
- Music by: Chris Westlake
- Production companies: After Dark Films; Signature Entertainment; Bettis Productions; Curtis Productions; The Fyzz Facility
- Distributed by: After Dark Films
- Release date: May 11, 2012
- Running time: 88 minutes
- Country: United States
- Language: English
- Box office: $663,432

Transit is a 2012 American action crime thriller film directed by Antonio Negret and written by Michael Gilvary. It stars Jim Caviezel, James Frain, Diora Baird, Elisabeth Röhm, Ryan Donowho, Sterling Knight, Harold Perrineau, and Jake Cherry. It follows a gang of bank robbers who stash their loot in a vacationing family's car and then try to retrieve it down the road.

== Plot ==
The film opens up with an armored truck coming across a car accident in the middle of a road. The driver finds this suspicious and prepares to drive off, but the truck is suddenly attacked by masked robbers. The driver tries to make a break for it, but his partner is revealed to be in on the heist. They execute the driver when an alarm in the truck goes off, and then his partner when he questions the lead robber's motives.

After the heist, local law enforcement have created road blocks in search of the robbers. The four robbers, Marek, his girlfriend Arielle, Losada, and getaway driver Evers know that they fit the profile of the robbers and so, to prevent themselves from being caught, hide the $4 million in a sleeping bag belonging to a family of four who are on a camping trip. They manage to hide the bag full of money in the family's camping gear on top of their Land Rover while the family uses restrooms at a small gas station.

Both the robbers and the family drive off and arrive at the road blockade. The robbers are immediately pulled over by the police and their vehicle is searched. As it is, the family passes through the blockade with no trouble. Aside from a police scanner belonging to Marek, the police are unable to find any incriminating evidence against them and let them go. The robbers catch up to the family in their black 1972 Chevrolet Chevelle. The father, Nate (Jim Caviezel) notices the Chevelle coming up behind him very fast. He tries to outrun the vehicle, but a police car detects his speed and pulls him over. The robbers manage to get away because Arielle detected the cruiser with the scanner. Nate tries to tell the officer the Chevelle was chasing him, but the patrolman insists because they were following him at great speed, it allowed them to get away with it.

Because of Louisiana state law, Nate is given a misdemeanour for reckless driving. Nate pleads with the officer not to give him the ticket because it will violate his parole, having spent the last 18 months in jail because of real estate fraud he committed. When he innocently begs the patrolman further, he is arrested and taken to the police station. Meanwhile, his wife Robyn (Elisabeth Rohm) and his two sons Shane (Sterling Knight) and Kenny (Jake Cherry) drive to a motel to spend the night while await Nate's release. Nate is put in a cell block for the night. Back at the motel, the robbers invade Robyn's motel room and attack her. She locks herself in the bathroom door, then escapes through the bathroom window. The robbers are forced to leave when they learn the police are on their way. Marek is frustrated they didn't find the money in Robyn's room and gets angered further when Evers revealed the family had two motel rooms, insisting the bag must have been in the other room.

The police arrive on scene, and bring Nate along once learning of the attack on his family. They decide to reduce the charges against Nate and give the family an escort out of town. Robyn and Shane demand to return home, but along with Kenny, Nate insists they need the trip in order to repair their relationship as a family and have family memories. The next morning, they leave the motel for the campgrounds. A police cruiser escorts them a few miles down the road before turning back and racing to another emergency. Meanwhile, the robbers spot the family Land Rover and head on after it. As they keep driving, one of the straps holding the camping gear comes loose and so the family pulls over to fix it. As Nate and Robyn unload the camping gear, he hands her the sleeping bag full of money. When she opens it, her face turns white. She tells the boys to get back into the car before lashing out at Nate. Robyn believes Nate actually stole the money from members of a laundering scheme that exposed his real-estate fraud and threw him in jail, and that they were the ones who attacked her at the motel, and insists the camping trip was nothing but a ruse for them to "start over". Nate is confused by her allegations and pleads with her he didn't do anything wrong. She throws the bag at Nate and drives off with the two boys, leaving him stranded. When he looks into the bag, he realizes that the money belongs to those in the Chevelle, hence the robbers.

Shane and Kenny plead their mother to turn the car around to get Nate, but they are attacked by the robbers in their Chevelle. They drive them off the road and cause them to crash into a log. Marek demands to know where the money is, and Robyn tells him her husband has it. Marek and Arielle drive off with the family while Losada and Evers remain in the Chevelle in-tow. Meanwhile, Nate walks on-foot, first down the road and then through the swamp adjacent to it. He hears a motorboat pass by and shouts for help. The driver of the boat spots Nate for a split second, but continues on and doesn't stop. Nate hides the money in a tree truck and returns to the road. As soon as he does, the Land Rover speeds pass him. He chases after it, but is too late to stop it. Suddenly, the Chevelle appears and Losada and Evers apprehend him. They take him captive and drive off after the others. Losada informs Marek they have Nate and the two cars intersect. Marek demands Nate to hand over the money, but Nate says he'll get it once his family is let go. Marek refuses to negotiate and holds Nate at gun point to show him where the money is hidden. They return to the spot with the tree trunk, where to his horror, Nate discovers the money is missing. He doesn't tell the robbers this and returns, stating once his family is set free he'll give them the money (he keeps eye contact with Losada while saying this). This angers Marek again, who says he's in charge and makes the rules, however this angers Losada who claims he should be in charge instead.

== Cast ==
- Jim Caviezel as Nate Sidwell
- Diora Baird as Arielle
- James Frain as Marek
- Sterling Knight as Shane
- Harold Perrineau as Losada
- Elisabeth Röhm as Robyn Sidwell
- Jake Cherry as Kenny
- Ryan Donowho as Evers
- Griff Furst as Lt. B. Morgan
- J. D. Evermore as Sgt. Doucette
- Rob Boltin as Sgt. Spurlock
- Douglas M. Griffin as Lt. Paolo
- Don Yesso as Sgt. Gazzo
- Jimmy Lee Jr. as Fisherman
- Joe Chrest as Armored Truck Driver
- Wayne Péré as Armored Truck Guard

== Production ==
In August 2010, it was announced that Jim Caviezel, Elisabeth Röhm, Harold Perrineau, Diora Baird, and James Frain had been cast in Transit, with Antonio Negret directing from a screenplay by Michael Gilvary.

The film was produced by Courtney Solomon and Moshe Diamant, while Joel Silver, Allan Zeman, Michael J. Gaeta, and Alison R. Rosenzweig served as executive producers. The original music was composed by Chris Westlake.

== Release ==
Transit was released in select theaters and on VOD on May 11, 2012, as part of the After Dark Action franchise. The film was later released on DVD in the United States on October 16, 2012, by Warner Home Video.

== Reception ==
On the review aggregator website Rotten Tomatoes, 50% of 8 critics' reviews are positive, with an average rating of 5.2/10.

Dennis Harvey of Variety remarked, "Transit seldom pauses long enough to let the lapses in story logic show. It's no Cape Fear, but it gets the job done with a certain bloody efficiency."

Catherine Shoard of The Guardian gave the film 2 out of 5 stars and called it a "try-hard thriller." Shoard opined, "Flip the leads and suddenly you've got a miles more interesting thriller. As it is, Transit delivers little of value, and never with a smile."

Ivan Radford of CineVue gave the film 3 out of 5 stars and stated, "Transit is at its best when channelling Steven Spielberg's 1971 effort Duel in its gripping first half. When it goes off-road, it skids out of control, but Negret never takes his foot off the accelerator – the 84 minutes are over before you know it."
