= 2002 National Society of Film Critics Awards =

Annual US film awards ceremony

37th NSFC Awards

January 4, 2003

Best Film:
The Pianist

The 37th National Society of Film Critics Awards, given on 4 January 2003, honored the best in film for 2002.

== Winners ==
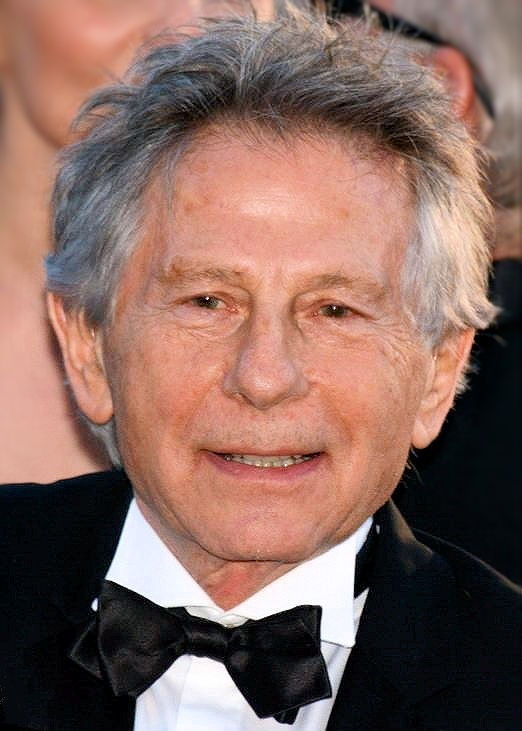
Roman Polanski, Best Director winner

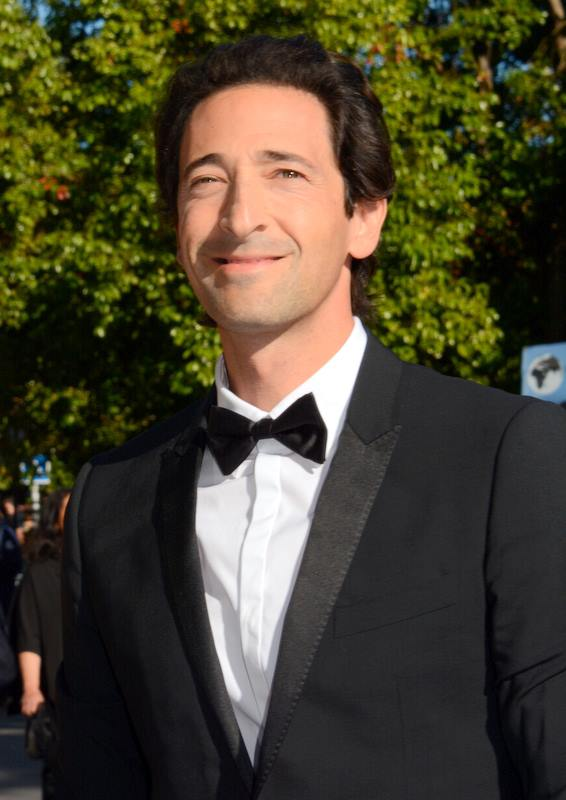
Adrien Brody, Best Actor winner

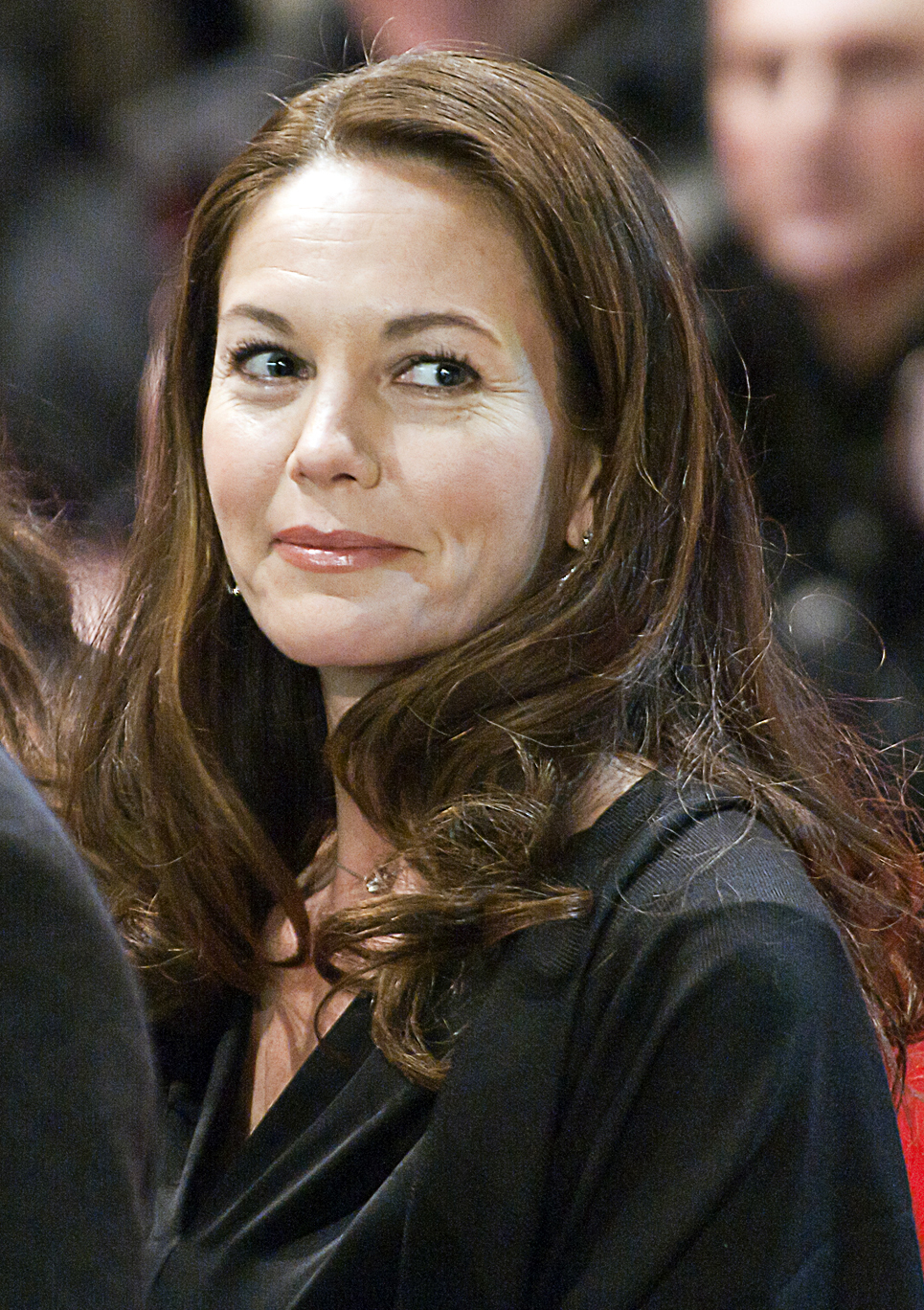
Diane Lane, Best Actress winner

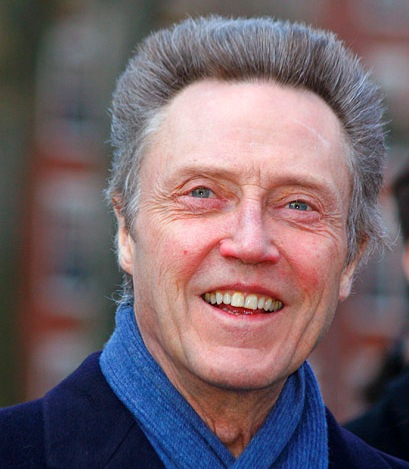
Christopher Walken, Best Supporting Actor winner

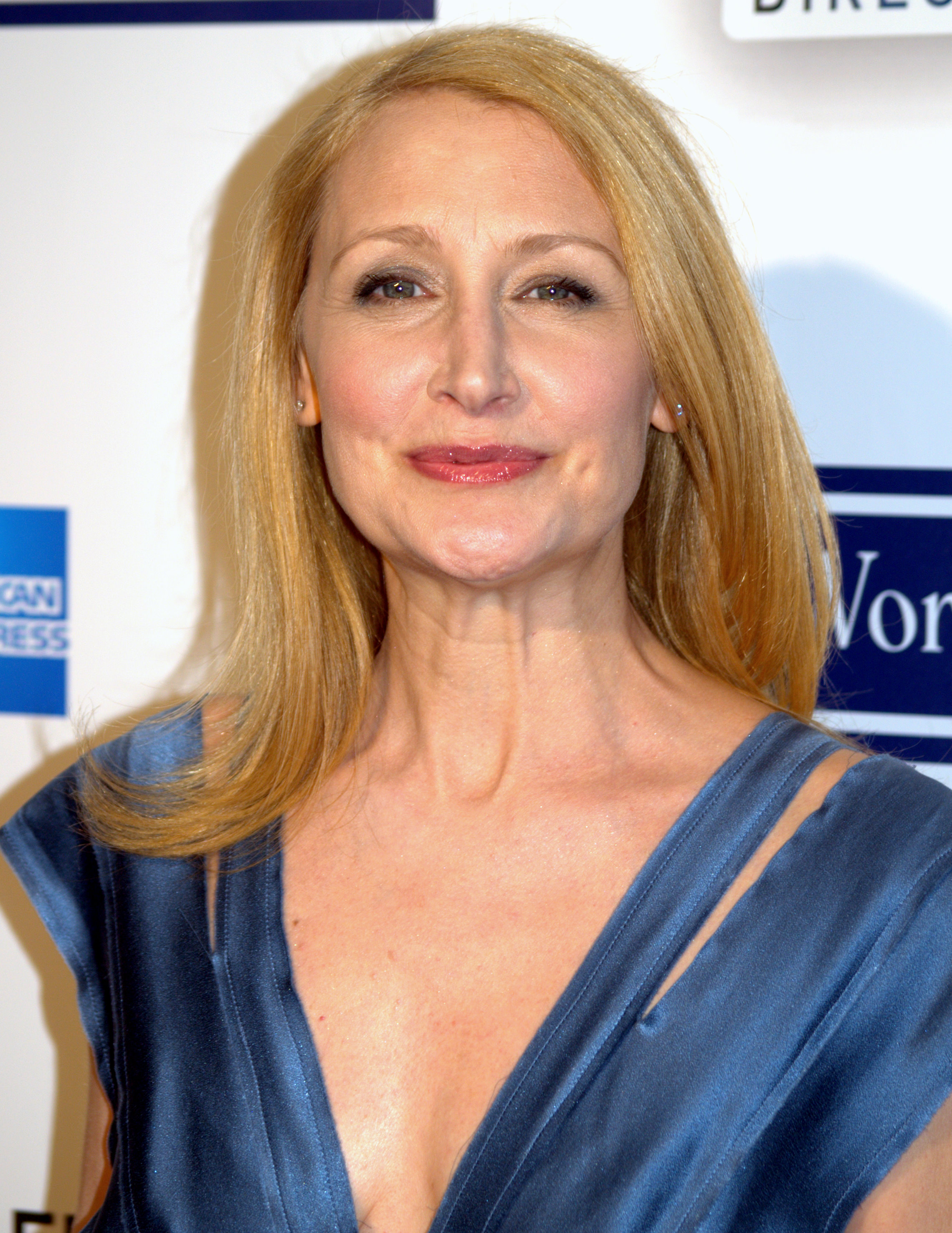
Patricia Clarkson, Best Supporting Actress winner

=== Best Picture ===
1. The Pianist
2. Y Tu Mamá También
3. Talk to Her (Hable con ella)

=== Best Director ===
1. Roman Polanski – The Pianist
2. Pedro Almodóvar – Talk to Her (Hable con ella)
3. Alfonso Cuarón – Y Tu Mamá También

=== Best Actor ===
1. Adrien Brody – The Pianist
2. Michael Caine – The Quiet American
3. Aurélien Recoing – Time Out (L'emploi du temps)

=== Best Actress ===
1. Diane Lane – Unfaithful
2. Maggie Gyllenhaal – Secretary
2. Isabelle Huppert – The Piano Teacher (La pianiste)

=== Best Supporting Actor ===
1. Christopher Walken – Catch Me If You Can
2. Chris Cooper – Adaptation.
3. Alan Arkin – Thirteen Conversations About One Thing

=== Best Supporting Actress ===
1. Patricia Clarkson – Far from Heaven
2. Fiona Shaw – Triumph of Love
3. Kathy Bates – About Schmidt

=== Best Screenplay ===
1. Ronald Harwood – The Pianist
2. Alexander Payne and Jim Taylor – About Schmidt
3. Carlos Cuarón and Alfonso Cuarón – Y Tu Mamá También

=== Best Cinematography ===
1. Edward Lachman – Far from Heaven
2. Paweł Edelman – The Pianist
3. Robert Elswit – Punch-Drunk Love

=== Best Foreign Language Film ===
1. Y Tu Mamá También
2. Talk to Her (Hable con ella)
3. Time Out (L'emploi du temps)

=== Best Non-Fiction Film ===
1. Standing in the Shadows of Motown
2. The Cockettes
3. Domestic Violence
3. The Kid Stays in the Picture

=== Film Heritage Award ===
- Kino International for releasing restored versions of Fritz Lang's Metropolis and D. W. Griffith silent films

=== Special Citation ===
- UCLA's film and television archives
