= Landmine Goes Click =

- Promotional release poster
- Directed by: Levan Bakhia
- Written by: Adrian Colussi; Levan Bakhia; Lloyd S. Wagner
- Produced by: Irakli Chikvaidze; Nika Apriashvili
- Starring: Sterling Knight; Spencer Locke; Kote Tolordava
- Cinematography: Vigen Vartanov
- Production companies: Sarke Studio; Imedi Films; Scatena & Rosner Films
- Distributed by: At Entertainment; Falcon Films; Gravitas Ventures; Monster Picture; Studio Hamburg Enterprises; Terror Films
- Release dates: 10 November 2015 (Fantasporto); 10 November 2015
- Running time: 110 minutes
- Country: Georgia
- Languages: English; Georgian

Landmine Goes Click is a 2015 English-language Georgian thriller exploitation film co-written and directed by Levan Bakhia. It stars Sterling Knight and Spencer Locke as Chris and Alicia, American tourists trapped by a landmine in the Georgian countryside; and Kote Tolordava as Ilya, a local who stumbles upon and terrorizes the two.

The film premiered on March 3, 2015, at Fantasporto, and was released on VOD platforms on November 10. The film received mixed reviews from critics, who praised its premise but were divided on its themes, depictions of violence against women, and overall execution. Further criticism was aimed toward its pacing and runtime.

== Plot ==
Fiancés Daniel and Alicia and their close friend, Chris, explore rural Georgia. Privately, a guilt-ridden Chris tells Alicia that he wants to confess to Daniel about an affair the two had, but Alicia rejects the idea. The following morning, Chris confronts Devi, who is rummaging through their items. Alicia tells Chris that Devi is a former colleague. While Devi is taking photos of the trio, Chris steps on a land mine left over from the Russo-Georgian War. Unable to move under the threat of the mine exploding, Devi offers to go get help several hours away.

After leaving, Devi climbs on a rock and watches the group with binoculars. Alicia and Daniel go to the top of a hill to find reception. Daniel seemingly calls emergency services before suddenly calling Alicia a whore. The two return to Chris, who admits that he informed Daniel of the affair. Daniel reveals that, in revenge, he deliberately manipulated Chris into stepping on the landmine. Daniel never made a phone call for help, as it is impossible to get reception in the area. Daniel then returns to Devi, and they leave. Alicia chooses to stay behind and help Chris.

After several hours, a hunter named Ilya and his dog find the stranded pair. After inquiring about how they got into the situation, Alicia tells Ilya about Daniel and the affair. An amused Ilya calls Alicia a whore and threatens to leave after being berated. Ilya demands Alicia's underwear, and she obliges. Ilya continuously forces Alicia to humiliate herself to obtain his radio and call for help. Ilya demands that Alicia undress in exchange for translating to his partner.

Ilya forces Alicia to remove her shirt, but she refuses to continue. Ilya points his shotgun at Chris but chases Alicia as she runs off. Noticing that Ilya dropped his weapon, Chris retrieves it. Ilya returns with Alicia in a chokehold with a knife in his hand. Unable to shoot, Chris is forced to watch as Ilya takes Alicia to a rock and rapes her while leaving his shotgun at Chris's feet. Chris attempts to shoot Ilya with the shotgun, but Ilya's dog attacks Chris, making Chris's shot miss and hit Alicia, killing her, as well as pushing Chris off the landmine, which does not explode. Ilya tells him the landmine is fake, as they normally blow up as soon as someone steps on it. Ilya walks away as Chris holds Alicia's body, crying.

Sometime later, Tanya and her teenage daughter, Lika, are stumbled upon by Chris at their home. Chris tells them he got lost, and the two invite him inside. It is revealed that the home belongs to Ilya and that Tanya and Lika are his wife and daughter. Upon seeing Chris, Ilya insists that he leave. After leaving, Chris kills Ilya's dog and returns with the body, claiming that he hit it by accident.

An enraged Ilya takes his shotgun and threatens Chris. Chris, who had already stolen its ammunition, shoots Ilya in both of his legs with a suppressed revolver and forces the family inside. Chris torments Lika, forcing her to do the same acts Alicia did as Ilya and Tanya watch. Chris begins to play Russian roulette with Lika and forces her to strip. As Lika undresses and Chris continues to play, he shoots her, killing her instantly. Chris stares blankly as Ilya and Tanya sob loudly.

== Cast ==
- Sterling Knight as Chris
- Spencer Locke as Alicia
- Kote Tolordava as Ilya
- Dean Geyer as Daniel
- Nana Kiknadze as Tanya
- Elene Bezarashvili as Lika
- Giorgi Tsaava as Devi
- Nika Apriashvili as Sergi

== Reception ==
Landmine Goes Click received mixed reviews from critics. On the review aggregator website Rotten Tomatoes, 50% of 6 critics' reviews are positive, with an average rating of 6.6/10. Metacritic, which uses a weighted average, assigned the film a score of 35 out of 100, based on 4 critics, indicating "generally unfavorable reviews".

CineVue writer Martyn Conterio gave the film 4 out of 5 stars, claiming that Bakhia's "intentions can be misinterpreted. The brutalization of three female characters is horrific, but it would be a presumptuous leap to suggest the film itself flexes a misogynistic creed." Anton Bitel of the British Film Institute gave a positive review, praising the overall theme and tension of the movie. A retroactive review by Bloody Disgusting writer Paul Lê criticized Tolordava's performance for being "overdone", but praised the film for its "unapologetic style and execution of classic exploitation filmmaking" and referred to it as "a step in the right direction."

In a Los Angeles Times review by Katie Walsh, she praised the film's premise but criticized the execution as a "hateful, arduous drag". Frank Sheck from The Hollywood Reporter gave high praise to the performances of Knight, Locke, and Tolordava, but criticized the pacing, writing that the film "suffers from far too leisurely storytelling. Director Bakhia favors long takes and generously allows for improvisation by the performers, with the result that every scene goes on much longer than necessary." Dennis Harvey in Variety said that the film's premise "might have made for a forceful 20-minute short" but that it "doesn’t profit from being stretched to five times that length".
