= Family of Spies =

- Genre: Spy; Action
- Written by: Richard DeLong Adams
- Directed by: Stephen Gyllenhaal
- Starring: Powers Boothe; Lesley Ann Warren; Lili Taylor; Graham Beckel
- Theme music composer: Paul Chihara
- Country of origin: United States
- Original language: English

Production
- Executive producers: Gerald W. Abrams; Jennifer Alward
- Producer: Jonathan Bernstein
- Production locations: U.S. Naval Station, Long Beach, California
- Cinematography: Douglas Milsome
- Editors: Michael Jablow; Lynne Southerland
- Running time: 175 minutes
- Production company: Black den Productions

Original release
- Network: CBS
- Release: February 4, 1990

Family of Spies, also known as Family of Spies: The Walker Spy Ring, is a 1990 TV movie based on the espionage of John A. Walker Jr. The film was directed by Stephen Gyllenhaal and starred Powers Boothe as John Walker.

== Plot ==
John A. Walker Jr. is a cryptologist with the US Navy on a sub. While he is away at sea his wife learns he has been unfaithful to her. He convinces her to stay with him and transfers to a shore post. Walker goes to the Soviet Embassy and agrees to become a spy for cash. He starts stealing secrets, but his wife becomes suspicious and learns what he's doing. The Navy also becomes suspicious because of the increased number of suspicious encounters between Soviet and American subs. Walker goes on a tour at sea and upon his return his wife threatens to shoot him. The Navy fakes a nuclear accident, which establishes that the Soviets are indeed getting inside info from the US Navy because of the way they react. When a Marine officer starts to get suspicious of him, Walker retires from the Navy. Walker recruits Jerry Whitworth, a navy radio operator into spying; telling him the info is going to Israel. Walker and his wife separate. John Walker's daughter joins the Army and he tries to recruit her as a spy, but she gets married, becomes pregnant and leaves the service. Walker becomes a private detective. Walker's son joins the Navy. Whitworth delivers a blurry roll of film because he wants more money. The Soviets think he has been turned and they try to kill Walker. Eventually Walker repairs his relationship with the Soviets. Walker recruits his son in the Navy as a spy. His ex-wife blackmails him into paying more so she won't tell. However, she finally calls the FBI and Walker's daughter confirms he tried to recruit her. After a lengthy investigation Walker, his son and Whitworth are arrested and sentenced to lengthy jail terms.

== Cast ==
- Powers Boothe as John A. Walker Jr.
- Lesley Ann Warren as Barbara Walker
- Lili Taylor as Laura Walker
- Graham Beckel as Jerry Whitworth
