= It Snows All the Time =

- Directed by: Jay Giannone
- Written by: Jay Giannone; Eric Watson
- Story by: Erich Hover
- Starring: Brett Cullen; Lesley Ann Warren; Taryn Manning; Sterling Knight
- Distributed by: Gravitas Ventures
- Release date: July 29, 2022
- Running time: 90 minutes
- Country: United States
- Language: English

It Snows All the Time is a 2022 American drama film directed by Jay Giannone and starring Brett Cullen, Lesley Ann Warren, Taryn Manning and Sterling Knight.

== Synopsis ==
It Snows All the Time is a drama film based on a true story. Inspired by the lead actor, Erich Hover's, own father and family. The story follows a family who are dedicated to supporting and tending to their father who is enduring a life changing neurological condition. They try to keep him in a comfortable setting and navigate through the situation. The film is intended to educate audiences about Frontotemporal Dementia. Themes of sex and drugs and sexual assault are featured.

== Cast ==
- Brett Cullen as Paul
- Erich Hover as Jesse
- Tatyana Ali as Technologist
- Sterling Knight as Art
- Erin Cahill as Marilyn
- Taryn Manning as April
- Lesley Ann Warren as Anne

== Release ==
In July 2022, it was announced that Gravitas Ventures acquired North American distribution rights to the film, which was released in select theaters and on VOD on July 29, 2022.

== Reception ==
Alex Saveliev of Film Threat rated the film a 4 out of 10.

Tara McNamara of Common Sense Media awarded the film one star out of five.
