= Wanda Holloway =

American criminal

Wanda Webb Holloway (born 1954) is an American woman from Channelview, Texas who was convicted of attempting to hire a hitman to kill the mother of her daughter's junior high school cheerleading rival.

== Background ==
In 1991, after Holloway's daughter Shanna narrowly missed out on a spot on her junior high school squad two consecutive years, Holloway's ex-brother-in-law, Terry Harper, reported to police that Holloway asked him to hire a hitman to kill Verna Heath, mother of the 13-year-old girl who had beaten Shanna onto the squad. Holloway allegedly believed that Heath's daughter would be so devastated by her mother's death that she would drop out of the cheerleading team, thereby giving the spot to Shanna. Holloway was arrested the next day.

== First trial ==
Key evidence in the case for the prosecution, headed by Mike Anderson, came down to tapes provided by Terry Harper along with his testimony. These tapes revealed the words of Holloway offering her diamond earrings in exchange for never seeing Verna Heath in Channelview again.

The defense lawyer, Troy McKinney, argued that Holloway's ex-husband, Tony Harper, had conspired with his brother to frame Holloway and she never intended anyone to get killed. McKinney pointed to the divorce between Tony Harper and Wanda Holloway in 1980 and an ensuing custody battle over their children. Terry Harper's estranged wife, Marla LaRue Harper, also testified that he had beaten her to scare her out of revealing that he said he was going to "get [Holloway] to say things" to help his brother get custody of his two children.

Holloway was convicted of solicitation of capital murder in the 1991 trial and sentenced to fifteen years in prison. However, Holloway's first sentence was overturned after a juror was revealed to have a previous felony drug arrest.

== Second trial ==
Holloway hired a new defense lawyer, Jack Zimmerman. This time Wanda Holloway pleaded "no contest" (nolo contendere), and Zimmerman successfully negotiated a plea deal for Holloway.

On September 9, 1996, state district court judge George Godwin sentenced Holloway to ten years in prison, with a fine of $10,000. On top of this, Holloway settled a civil suit filed by the Heath family. On October 2, 1994, Holloway agreed to pay a total of $150,000 to the victims. It was decided in court that $70,000 would be given to Verna and her husband, $30,000 to the children of Verna, and $50,000 to cover the legal expenses of the case.

== Early release ==
Holloway was released on March 1, 1997, after serving just six months of her sentence. The judge ordered her to serve the remaining 9.5 years on probation, and to complete 1,000 hours of community service.

== In the media ==
Reenactments made about the incident include:

- American Justice, Season 6, Episode 13: "The Texas Cheerleader Murder Plot."
- City Confidential, Season 4, Episode 6: "Houston: Cheers and Fears."
- The Positively True Adventures of the Alleged Texas Cheerleader-Murdering Mom, a 1993 HBO film which starred Holly Hunter as Wanda Holloway.
- Willing to Kill: The Texas Cheerleader Story, a 1992 ABC film with Lesley Ann Warren as Wanda Holloway.
- Mother Love, Deadly Love, a book by Anne Maier written in 1994
- Momsters: When Moms Go Bad, Season 1, Episode 1: "A Killer Routine", television program on ID.
- Law & Order, Season 2, Episode 20: "Intolerance"
- Law & Order: Special Victims Unit, Season 18, Episode 11: "Great Expectations"
- Law & Order: Criminal Intent, Season 7, Episode 15: "Please Note We Are No Longer Accepting Recommendation Letters From Henry Kissinger"
