= Lesley Ann Warren =

American actress

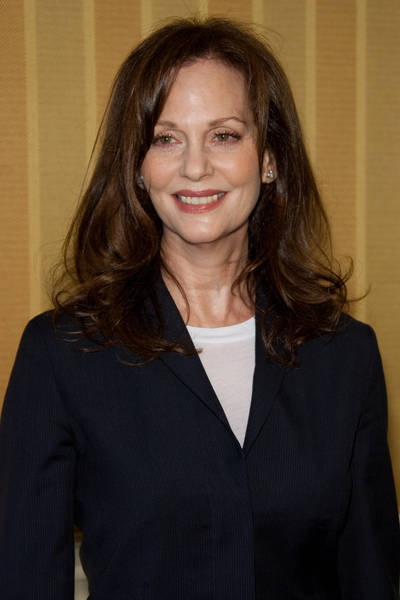
- Warren in 2009
- Born: August 16, 1946 (age 80); Manhattan, New York City, U.S.
- Other name: Lesley Warren
- Occupations: Actress; singer
- Years active: 1963–present
- Spouses: Jon Peters (m. 1967; div. 1975) Ron Taft (m. 2000)
- Partner(s): Jeffrey Hornaday (1977–1985)
- Children: 1

Lesley Ann Warren (born August 16, 1946) is an American actress.

She made her Broadway debut in 110 in the Shade in 1963. In 1965 she received wide recognition for playing the title role in the television musical production of Cinderella. She then had starring roles in the Disney musical films The Happiest Millionaire (1967) and The One and Only, Genuine, Original Family Band (1968).

In the 1970s, Warren worked mostly on television, receiving a Golden Globe nomination for playing Dana Lambert in the CBS drama series Mission: Impossible (1970–71). In 1978, she won a Golden Globe for Best Actress in a Drama Series for the NBC miniseries Harold Robbins' 79 Park Avenue. In 1983, Warren was nominated for an Academy Award for Best Supporting Actress for playing Norma Cassidy in Victor/Victoria. She received two additional Golden Globe nominations for performances in Songwriter (1984) and Family of Spies (1990).

Her other film appearances include Race for the Yankee Zephyr (1981), A Night in Heaven (1983), Choose Me (1984), Clue (1985), Burglar (1987), Cop (1988), Life Stinks (1991), Pure Country (1992), Color of Night (1994), The Limey (1999), Secretary (2002) and Home Delivery (2026).

== Early life ==
Warren was born on August 16, 1946, in Manhattan, the daughter of real estate agent William C. Warren (born Woronoff), and the former Carol Margot Dorothea Verblow, a nightclub singer who migrated to the US from Eastbourne, England. She has a younger brother, Richard Lewis Warren. Her family is Jewish, with roots in Russia on both sides.

She attended the Professional Children's School at the age of six and The High School of Music & Art at the age of 13.

== Career ==
=== 1960s and 1970s ===
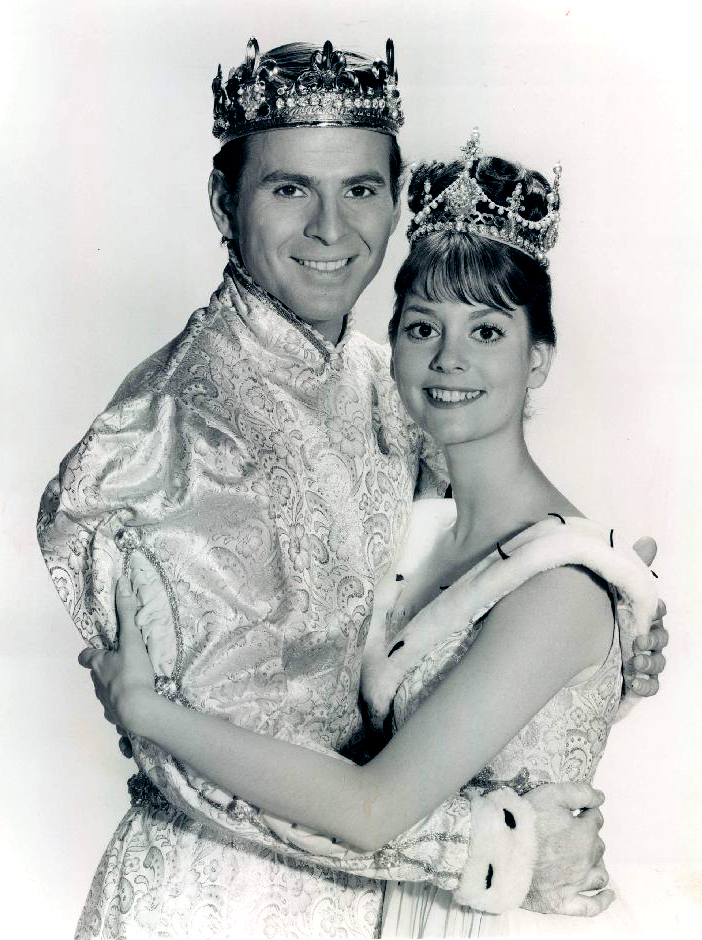
Warren as Cinderella in Cinderella (1965), pictured with Stuart Damon as the Prince

Warren began training as a ballet dancer at the age of 6, entering the School of American Ballet in 1961. The following year she made a tape of herself singing the Queen of the Night aria from The Magic Flute (the first and only time she sang opera). She entered the Actors Studio at the age of 17 — reputedly the youngest applicant ever to be accepted. Her Broadway debut came in 1963 in the musical 110 in the Shade. She won the Theatre World Award for her performance in the 1965 flop musical Drat! The Cat!

Warren achieved her first major television success in the title role of Rodgers and Hammerstein's Cinderella in 1965. Her television appearances through the decade included Dr. Kildare, Gunsmoke, The Mod Squad, Love, American Style, and The Carol Burnett Show.

Her film debut in the 1967 musical comedy The Happiest Millionaire was the last movie Walt Disney produced before his death. Warren would again share the screen with John Davidson the following year in the musical film The One and Only, Genuine, Original Family Band. She placed No. 15 on the Laurel Awards list for Female New Face in 1968.

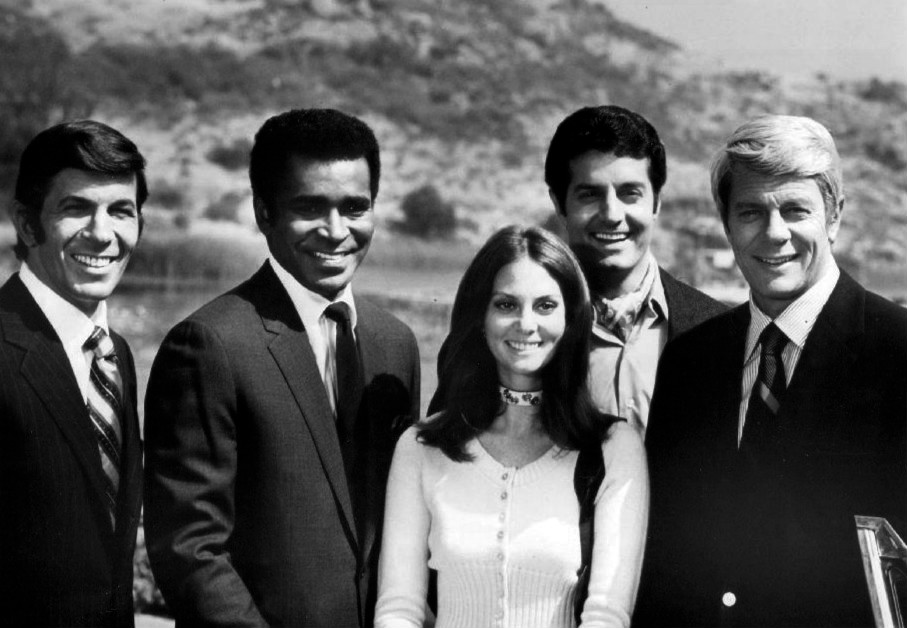
Warren with Mission: Impossible cast in 1970

Notable in television roles throughout the 1970s, Warren was leading lady Dana Lambert during the 1970–71 season of the CBS action drama Mission: Impossible. Her performance earned a Golden Globe nomination for Best Supporting Actress. Additional TV movies and miniseries of this time include The Daughters of Joshua Cabe (1972) and The Letters (1973).

Warren appeared in two feature films during the decade, Pickup on 101 (1972) and Harry and Walter Go to New York (1976). In between films, she returned to the stage to portray Scarlett O'Hara in the 1973 Los Angeles production of the musical Scarlett, though poor reviews prevented the intended Broadway run.

Warren played a fatefully and fatally gullible psychiatric patient opposite Peter Falk and George Hamilton in the 1975 Columbo episode "A Deadly State of Mind". Warren also played Lois Lane in the 1975 TV special It's a Bird... It's a Plane... It's Superman, adapted from the Broadway musical of the same name. (Warren would screen test for the role of Lois Lane in the Superman film, ultimately cast with Margot Kidder.) In the same year, Warren guest starred in season 3, episode 15 of The Muppet Show.

Other television credits include The Legend of Valentino (1975), Betrayal (1978), and Pearl (1978). She received critical acclaim, as well as the Golden Globe Award for Best Actress – Television Series Drama in 1978, for the NBC miniseries Harold Robbins' 79 Park Avenue. Warren delved into the antics of The Muppet Show as the guest star of a third season episode in 1979.

=== The 1980s and 1990s ===
In 1981, Warren returned to the big screen starring alongside Ken Wahl, George Peppard, and Donald Pleasence in Race for the Yankee Zephyr, a New Zealand suspense-action-thriller film directed by David Hemmings. The following year, she played ditzy gun moll Norma Cassidy in Blake Edwards' musical comedy Victor/Victoria for which she was nominated for a Golden Globe and Academy Award for Best Supporting Actress. She went to star in the 1983 romantic drama A Night in Heaven with Christopher Atkins; critics widely panned the film. Warren received another Golden Globe Award nomination for Best Supporting Actress for starring opposite Willie Nelson and Kris Kristofferson in the 1984 musical comedy film Songwriter. That same year, she had a leading role in the love triangle drama Choose Me with Keith Carradine and Genevieve Bujold. She turned down a chance to audition for the Kathleen Turner role in Romancing the Stone. In 1985, she starred as one of the prime murder suspects, Miss Scarlet, in the comedy film version of the popular board game Clue. In 1986, Warren starred in the TV movie of the week A Fight for Jenny directed by Gilbert Moses of Roots. It was based on a true story of a mother who loses custody of her daughter due to an interracial relationship.

Warren played supporting roles in a number of movies, including Burglar (1987) with Whoopi Goldberg, Cop (1988) with James Woods, Worth Winning (1989) with Mark Harmon, Life Stinks (1991) with Mel Brooks and Pure Country (1992) with George Strait. In Color of Night (1994) Warren played a nymphomaniac; the film was poorly received, and she was nominated for a Golden Raspberry Award for Worst Supporting Actress. However, it was successful on the home video market. On television, she went to star in Beulah Land (1980), Portrait of a Showgirl (1982), Evergreen (1985) and Baja Oklahoma (1988). She received Primetime Emmy Award for Outstanding Lead Actress in a Limited Series or Movie and Golden Globe Award for Best Actress – Miniseries or Television Film nominations for Family of Spies in 1990. Warren also played Princess Jeanetta in the 1987 Faerie Tale Theatre episode "The Dancing Princesses", an adaptation of the fairy tale "The Twelve Dancing Princesses". In 1986, Warren was prominently featured in Bob Seger's popular music video for his hit song "American Storm". In 1989, she appeared in the Aerosmith music video "Janie's Got a Gun", wherein she played Janie's mother. She was also featured in a video for the Eagles' "Life in the Fast Lane". In 1995, she co-starred opposite Ben Kingsley in the television film Joseph. In 1997, Warren returned to Broadway, starring in Dream, a musical revue featuring the lyrics of Johnny Mercer. She had a major role in Steven Soderbergh's The Limey (1999), starring Terence Stamp.

=== 2000s and 2010s ===
In the 2000s, Warren appeared in a number of independent films, most notably the 2002 comedy-drama Secretary, playing the mother of the title character.

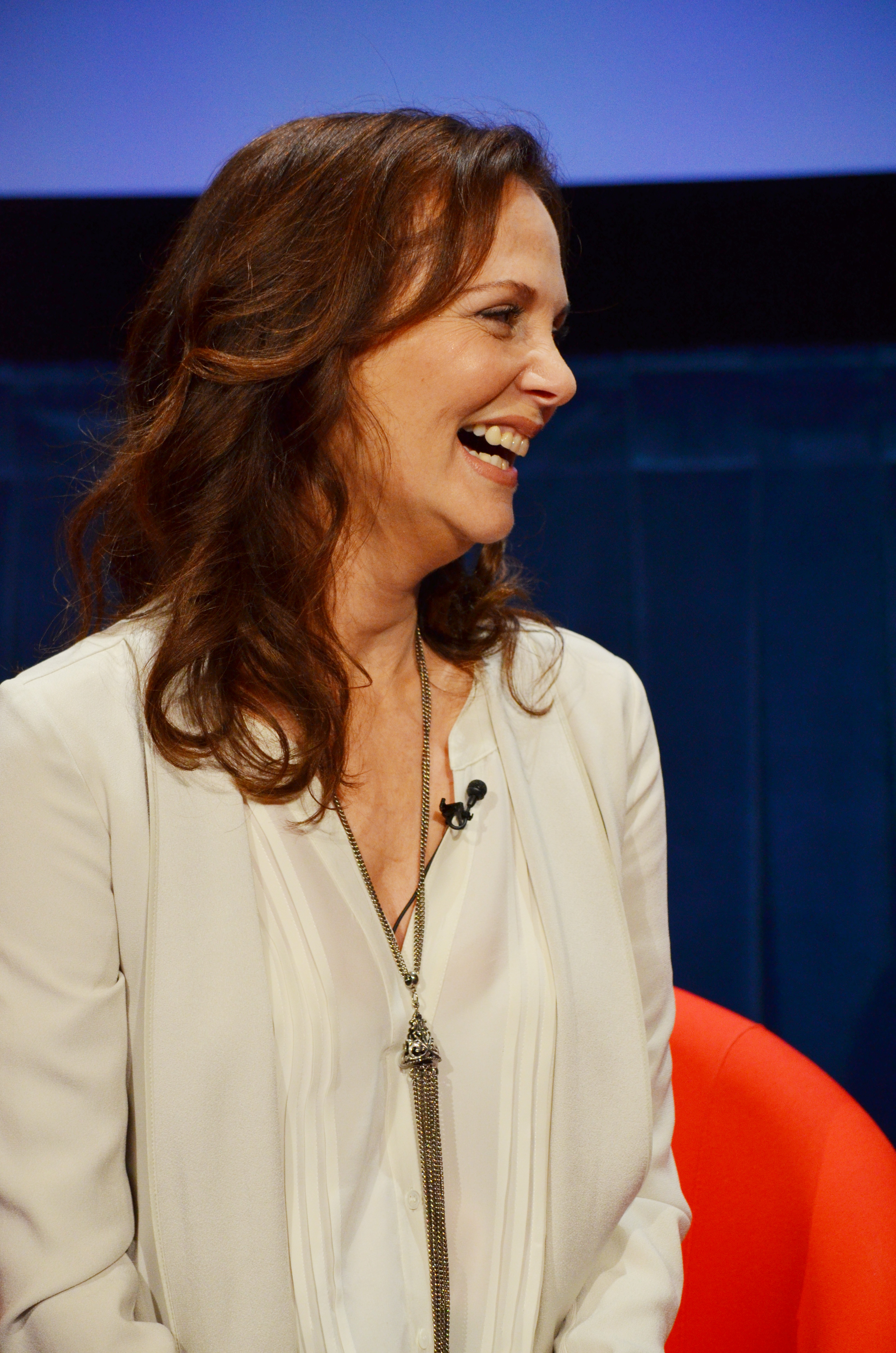
Warren in 2012

She had recurring roles on the NBC sitcom Will & Grace from 2001 to 2006 as Will Truman's father's mistress and in 2005 in the ABC comedy-drama Desperate Housewives as Susan Mayer's mother. Other television credits included Touched by an Angel, The Practice, Crossing Jordan and Less than Perfect. From 2008 to 2012, Warren played the role of Jinx Shannon, the lead character's alcoholic mother in the USA Network drama series In Plain Sight. While working on that show, Warren was offered Mary Steenburgen's role in Step Brothers (2008) but had to turn it down because of scheduling conflicts.

Warren appeared in the films Peep World (2010), Jobs (2013), I Am Michael (2015) and 3 Days with Dad (2019). In 2013, she reunited with Clue castmates Christopher Lloyd and Martin Mull when they guest-starred in an episode of Psych, and again with Martin Mull in 2015 guest-starring on Community. In 2016, she had a recurring role in the Starz comedy Blunt Talk and in 2018 appeared in the Netflix superhero series Daredevil as Esther Falb. In 2019, she co-starred in the short-lived Lifetime comedy-drama series American Princess, and appeared opposite Sarah Drew in the Lifetime Christmas movie Twinkle All the Way.

=== 2020s ===
In 2021, Warren guest-starred in an episode of the legal series All Rise on CBS. In 2022, she appeared as a regular cast member of the crime dramedy streaming series Panhandle, and had a featured role in the independent film It Snows All the Time.

== Personal life ==
Warren married producer Jon Peters in 1967 and divorced him in 1975 after a two-year separation. They have one son, Christopher Peters. From 1977 to 1985, she lived with choreographer Jeffrey Hornaday. She also briefly dated producer Robert Evans, saxophonist David Sanborn, singers Bobby Darin and Paul Stanley, and actors Scott Baio, Robert Blake, Val Kilmer, and John Strasberg. Since 2000, Warren has been married to advertising executive Ron Taft, whom she met at a hair salon in 1991.

== Filmography ==
=== Film ===
Year	Title	Role	Notes
1967	The Happiest Millionaire	Cordy	
1968	The One and Only, Genuine, Original Family Band	Alice Bower	Laurel Award for Female New Face (15th place)
1972	Pickup on 101	Nicky	
1976	Harry and Walter Go to New York	Gloria Fontaine	
1981	Treasure of the Yankee Zephyr	Sally Gibson	
1982	Victor/Victoria	Norma Cassidy	Nominated — Academy Award for Best Supporting Actress; Nominated — Golden Globe Award for Best Supporting Actress – Motion Picture; Nominated — New York Film Critics Circle Award for Best Supporting Actress
1983	A Night in Heaven	Faye Hanlon	
1984	Choose Me	Eve	
1984	Songwriter	Gilda	Nominated — Golden Globe Award for Best Supporting Actress – Motion Picture
1985	Clue	Miss Scarlet	
1987	Burglar	Dr. Cynthia Sheldrake	
1988	Cop	Kathleen McCarthy	
1989	Worth Winning	Eleanor Larimore	
1991	Life Stinks	Molly	
1992	Pure Country	Lula Rogers	
1994	Color of Night	Sondra Dorio	Nominated — Golden Raspberry Award for Worst Supporting Actress
1995	Bird of Prey	Carla Carr	
1996	Natural Enemy	Sandy	
1997	Going All the Way	Nina Casselman	
1998	Love Kills	Evelyn Heiss	
1998	All of It	Glenda Holbeck	
1998	Richie Rich's Christmas Wish	Regina Rich	
1999	The Limey	Elaine	
1999	Twin Falls Idaho	Francine	
1999	Teaching Mrs. Tingle	Mrs. Faye Watson	Uncredited
2000	Ropewalk	Charlie's mom	
2000	Trixie	Dawn Sloane	
2001	Delivering Milo	Anna	
2001	The Quickie	Anna	
2001	Losing Grace	Mary Reed	
2001	Wolf Girl	Dr. Klein	
2002	Secretary	Joan Holloway	
2004	My Tiny Universe	Vee	
2005	Constellation	Nancy Boxer	
2005	When Do We Eat?	Peggy Stuckman	
2005	Deepwater	Pam	
2005	The Shore	Mrs. Becky Harris	
2006	Miracle Dogs Too	Nurse Bleaker	
2006	10th & Wolf	Tina	
2010	Stiffs	Joy Tramontana	
2010	A Little Help	Joan Dunning	
2010	Peep World	Marilyn Meyerwitz	
2013	Jobs	Clara Jobs	
2015	I Am Michael	Susan	
2015	The Sphere and the Labyrinth	Wendy	
2016	Between Us	Elsa	
2017	Ray Meets Helen		Executive producer
2018	American Pets	Judy	
2019	3 Days with Dad	Dawn	
2020	Echo Boomers	Author	
2022	It Snows All the Time	Anne	
2025	Love, Danielle	Candie	
2026	Home Delivery	Linda Templeton	
TBA	The Bay House	Joan Brooks	

=== Television ===
Year	Title	Role	Notes
1965	Cinderella	Cinderella	TV film
1965	For the People	Terry	"Dangerous to the Public Peace and Safety"
1966	Dr. Kildare	Bonda Jo Weaver	Guest role (4 episodes)
1966	Gunsmoke	Betsy Payson	"Harvest"
1966	Run for Your Life	Julie Foster	"The Last Safari"
1967	The Carol Burnett Show	Herself	"The Lost Episodes"
1969	The Mod Squad	Virginia 'Ginny' Wells	"A Run for the Money"
1969	Seven in Darkness	Deborah Cabot	ABC Movie of the Week
1969	Love, American Style	Tippi	"Love and the Divorce Sale"
1970–71	Mission: Impossible	Dana Lambert	Main role (season 5); Nominated — Golden Globe Award for Best Supporting Actress – Series, Miniseries or Television Film
1971	Love Hate Love	Sheila Blunden	ABC Movie of the Week
1971	Cat Ballou	Cat Ballou	TV film
1972	Assignment: Munich	Cathy Lange	TV film
1972	The Daughters of Joshua Cabe	Mae	ABC Movie of the Week
1973	Dr. Simon Locke	Laura March	"Requiem for a Canary"
1973	Night Gallery	Hyacinth	"Death on a Barge"
1973	The Letters	Laura Reynolds	TV film
1973	Saga of Sonora	Emmy Lou	TV film
1975	It's a Bird... It's a Plane... It's Superman	Lois Lane	TV film
1975	Columbo	Nadia Donner	"A Deadly State of Mind"
1975	S.W.A.T.	Linda	"Deadly Tide: Parts 1 & 2"
1975	Doctors' Hospital	Sybil Payson	"Sleepless and Pale Eyelids"
1975	Harry O	Gail Stephens	"APB Harry Orwell"
1975	The Legend of Valentino	Laura Lorraine	TV film
1976	Snip	Beverly	Unsold TV series
1976	Jigsaw John	Claudine	"Too Much, Too Soon"
1977	79 Park Avenue	Marja Fludjicki / Marianne	TV miniseries Golden Globe Award for Best Actress – Television Series Drama
1978	Betrayal	Julie Roy	TV film
1978	Pearl	Dr. Carol Lang	TV miniseries
1979	The Muppet Show	Herself	Episode 3.15
1979	Portrait of a Stripper	Susie Hanson	TV film
1980	Beulah Land	Sarah Pennington	TV miniseries
1982	Portrait of a Showgirl	Jillian Brooks	TV film
1985	Evergreen	Anna Friedman	TV miniseries
1986	Apology	Lily	TV film
1986	A Fight for Jenny	Kelsey Wilkes	TV film
1987	Faerie Tale Theatre	Jeanetta	"The Dancing Princesses"
1988	Baja Oklahoma	Juanita Hutchins	TV film Nominated — CableACE Award for Best Actress in a Movie or Miniseries
1990	Family of Spies	Barbara Walker	TV miniseries Nominated — Golden Globe Award for Best Actress – Miniseries or Television Film; Nominated — Primetime Emmy Award for Outstanding Lead Actress in a Limited Series or Movie
1990	American Playwrights Theater: The One-Acts	Flora	"27 Wagons Full of Cotton"; Nominated — CableACE Award for Best Actress in a Movie or Miniseries
1990	Lola	Lola Baltic	TV film
1991	A Seduction in Travis County	Melanie Evans	TV film
1992	In Sickness and in Health	Anita Mattison	TV film
1992	Willing to Kill: The Texas Cheerleader Story	Wanda Holloway	TV film
1993	A Mother's Revenge	Carol Sanders	TV film
1995	Murderous Intent	Gayle	TV film
1995	Joseph	Potiphar's Wife	TV Miniseries
1999	Jesse	Susan	"Momma Was a Rollin' Stone"
2000	Twice in a Lifetime	Rhonda Finkelstein / Sadie Arnstein	"Matchmaker, Matchmaker"
2001–2006	Will & Grace	Tina	Recurring role
2002	St. Sass	Slim Kaplan	TV film
2002–2005	Crossing Jordan	Arlene Lebowski	"Don't Look Back", "Locard's Exchange"
2003	Touched by an Angel	Kelly Cartwright	"As It Is in Heaven"
2003	The Practice	Sylvia Bakey	"Choirboys", "Special Deliveries"
2003	Recipe for Disaster	Marie Korda	TV film
2004	Less than Perfect	Diane Steadman	"Claude's Apartment"
2005–2011	Desperate Housewives	Sophie Bremmer	Recurring role
2008–2012	In Plain Sight	Jinx Shannon	Main role
2009	Bound by a Secret	Jane Tetley	TV film
2011	Working Class	Barbara	"Medieval Woman"
2013	Psych	Leslie	"100 Clues"
2015	Community	Deb Perry	"Lawnmower Maintenance & Postnatal Care", "Advanced Safety Features"
2015	Gigi Does It	Tretchy Feinberg	"Wart-a-Colors", "Whine"
2016	Blunt Talk	Cornelia	3 episodes
2016–17	Girlfriends' Guide to Divorce	Dina	"No Means... No", "Let Them Eat Cupcakes"
2018	Daredevil	Esther Falb	Episode: "Reunion"
2019	The Cool Kids	Kathleen	Episode: "Charlie's Angel"
2019	American Princess	Joanntha Klein	3 Episodes
2019	Twinkle All the Way	Twinkle Harrison	Television film
2020	Broke	Alex McBride	Episode: "Mom's Secret"
2020	Blind Psychosis	Tabatha Burks	Television film
2021	All Rise	Samara Strong	Episode: "Bette Davis Eyes"
2021	Panhandle	Millicent Prescott	Main role (8 episodes)
2025	9-1-1	Ann Hutchinson	Episode: "Holy Mother of God"

== Awards and nominations ==
Year	Award	Category	Nominated work	Result	Ref.
1968	Laurel Awards	Best New Female Face	—N/a	Nominated	
1968	Photoplay Awards	Most Promising New Star - Female	—N/a	Nominated	
1971	Golden Globe Awards	Best Supporting Actress - Television	Mission: Impossible	Nominated	
1978	Golden Globe Awards	Best Actress in a Television Series - Drama	Harold Robbins' 79 Park Avenue	Won	
1982	New York Film Critics Circle Awards	Best Supporting Actress	Victor/Victoria	Nominated	
1983	Golden Globe Awards	Best Actress in a Supporting Role - Motion Picture	Victor/Victoria	Nominated	
1983	Academy Awards	Best Actress in a Supporting Role	Victor/Victoria	Nominated	
1985	Golden Globe Awards	Best Actress in a Supporting Role - Motion Picture	Songwriter	Nominated	
1989	CableACE Awards	Best Actress in a Movie or Miniseries	Baja Oklahoma	Nominated	
1990	Primetime Emmy Awards	Outstanding Lead Actress in a Miniseries or a Special	Family of Spies	Nominated	
1991	CableACE Awards	Best Actress in a Dramatic Series	American Playwrights Theater: The One Acts ("27 Wagons Full of Cotton")	Nominated	
1991	Golden Globe Awards	Best Actress in a Limited Series, Anthology Series, or a Motion Picture Made for Television	Family of Spies	Nominated	
1995	Golden Raspberry Awards	Worst Supporting Actress	Color of Night	Nominated	
2005	Online Film & Television Association	Best Guest Actress in a Comedy Series	Desperate Housewives	Nominated	
2005	Gold Derby Awards	Comedy Guest Actress	Desperate Housewives	Nominated	
