= 3 Days with Dad =

2019 American comedy film

- Film poster
- Directed by: Larry Clarke
- Written by: Larry Clarke
- Produced by: Brad Brizendine; Kirk Roos
- Starring: Larry Clarke; Tom Arnold; Julie Ann Emery; Mo Gaffney; Jon Gries; Eric Edelstein; J. K. Simmons; Lesley Ann Warren; Brian Dennehy
- Cinematography: Christopher Gallo
- Music by: John Ballinger
- Production companies: Badlands Features; EVC Productions
- Distributed by: Unified Pictures
- Release date: September 13, 2019
- Running time: 94 minutes
- Country: United States
- Language: English

3 Days with Dad is a 2019 American comedy film written and directed by Larry Clarke and starring Clarke, Tom Arnold, Julie Ann Emery, Mo Gaffney, Jon Gries, Eric Edelstein, J. K. Simmons, Lesley Ann Warren and Brian Dennehy (in his last film during his lifetime).

== Cast ==
- Larry Clarke as Eddie Mills
- Tom Arnold as Andy Mills
- Julie Ann Emery as Susan
- Mo Gaffney as Diane
- Jon Gries as Tim
- Eric Edelstein as Zak
- J. K. Simmons as Joey
- Lesley Ann Warren as Dawn
- Brian Dennehy as Bob Mills
- Amy Landecker as Velma
- Mike O'Malley as Brick Deever
- David Koechner as Dr. Clarence Gray
- Steele Stebbins as Jay

== Release ==
The film had a limited release in the United States on 13 September 2019. As of October 2021, 64% of the 14 reviews compiled on Rotten Tomatoes are positive, with an average rating of 5.9/10.

== Production ==
While the budget for the movie was never disclosed, casting and early production began around January 2019. The movie was released nine months later. The movie was produced by Badlands Features in association with EVC Productions, and was distributed Unified Pictures. The movie was written and directed by Larry Clarke, an actor known by fans for gritty and often disturbing movies, which often spark controversy in film-related settings.
