= Sterling Knight =

American actor

- Born: Sterling Sandmann Knight; March 5, 1989 (age 37); Hilton Head Island, South Carolina, U.S.
- Occupations: Actor; singer; dancer
- Years active: 2005–present

Sterling Sandmann Knight (born March 5, 1989) is an American actor, singer, and dancer. He is known for his role as Chad Dylan Cooper in the Disney Channel sitcom Sonny with a Chance and its spinoff So Random!, Zander Carlson in Melissa & Joey, and Christopher Wilde in the Disney Channel Original Movie Starstruck.

== Early life ==
Knight was born in Hilton Head Island, South Carolina. He has a sister, Samantha Scarlett, and a brother, Spencer Shuga.

== Career ==
Knight began his career on stage in local productions. He made his acting debut in minor roles in Calm, Career Day, and Hi-Jinks. Knight's first role with Disney was in an episode of Hannah Montana, playing Lilly’s boyfriend Lucas, in 2007. Later in the year, Knight also appeared in two episodes of The Closer. In 2008, Knight appeared in Out of Jimmy's Head and Grey's Anatomy. In 2009, Knight played the role of Chad Dylan Cooper, an egotistical and self-centered cast member of Mackenzie Falls and self-proclaimed Hollywood legend in Sonny with a Chance. Knight made his film debut in 17 Again playing Alex O'Donnell, Matthew Perry/Zac Efron's son who was bullied by his sister's boyfriend.

In 2010, Knight played teen heart-throb Christopher Wilde in the Disney Channel Original Movie Starstruck. According to comments Knight made on Twitter, because he joined the cast so late, he only sang one song on the soundtrack, the opening song. His character's remaining songs were sung by Drew Ryan Scott. Knight's next project was the movie Elle: A Modern Cinderella Tale with Ashlee Hewitt. He plays Ty Parker, a singer/songwriter who's looking for a change in his music and then finds a girl recording in a studio and when she leaves him he goes on a journey to find her. The movie was released in April 2010.

In 2011, Knight returned to be in the Sonny with a Chance spinoff sketch comedy series So Random!. His recurring characters on So Random! included Possibly Sarcastic Skip, Dwayne Platowski, and Jimmy Sparrow and his impressions included Ralph Fiennes (as Lord Voldemort), Lucas Cruikshank (as Fred), Taylor Lautner (as Jacob Black), and Justin Bieber. The show was cancelled after one season.

In 2012, Knight starred as Shane Seedwell in the action thriller film Transit co-starring Jim Caviezel and Elisabeth Rohm. As of 2013 he is appearing as a guest star on Melissa & Joey as Lennox's boyfriend and later fiancé Zander. Knight returned for the 4th and final season in 2014. In 2014, he starred as Billy in The Hotwives of Orlando, a Hulu original series.

In 2015, Knight starred as Chris in the action crime drama film Landmine Goes Click. In 2016, Knight guest-starred in two episodes of NBC series Crowded, where he played the love interest of Miranda Cosgrove's character. In 2017, he starred as Cameron Fullbright in the go90 comedy series In the Rough. He had a supporting role in the movie Different Flowers. He played the role of Philip in the sci-fi drama The Man from Earth: Holocene. In 2022, he had a supporting role in It Snows All the Time.

== Personal life ==
In November 2014, Knight began dating actress Ayla Kell, whom he had met on the set of Melissa & Joey. The couple announced their engagement in October 2018. They ended their relationship in 2019.

== Filmography ==
Film roles
Year	Title	Role	Notes
2009	Balls Out: Gary the Tennis Coach	Opponent Tennis Player	
2009	17 Again	Alex O'Donnell	
2010	Starstruck	Christopher Wilde	
2010	Privileged	Soph	
2010	Elle: A Modern Cinderella Tale	Ty Parker	
2011	The Muppets	Himself	
2012	Transit	Shane	
2015	Landmine Goes Click	Chris	
2016	It Snows All The Time	Art	
2017	Different Flowers	Charlie	
2017	The Man from Earth: Holocene	Philip	
2022	It Snows All the Time	Art	
2026	40 Dates and 40 Nights	Date #2	

Television roles
Year	Title	Role	Notes
2006	Hi-Jinks	Brendan	Episode: "Winner"
2007	The Closer	Grady Reed	Episodes: "Next of Kin: Parts 1 & 2"
2007	Hannah Montana	Lucas	Episode: "My Best Friend's Boyfriend"
2008	Out of Jimmy's Head	Brad	Episode: "Bad Fad"
2008	Grey's Anatomy	Kip	Episodes: "Freedom: Parts 1 & 2"
2009–2011	Sonny with a Chance	Chad Dylan Cooper	Main role (Note: Also plays as Chaz Milton Looper in the episode "My Two Chads")
2010	Starstruck	Christopher Wilde	Television film
2011–2012	So Random!	Chad Dylan Cooper	Main role
2013	Randy Cunningham: 9th Grade Ninja	Buttermaker	Voice role; episodes: "Wave Slayers", "McFreaks"
2013–2015	Melissa & Joey	Zander Carlson	Recurring role
2014	The Hotwives of Orlando	Billy	Recurring role (season 1)
2016	Crowded	Nate	Episodes: "Fixer", "Daughter"
2017	In the Rough	Cameron Fullbright	Web series; main role

Music videos
Year	Artist	Title	Role
2008	Demi Lovato	"La La Land"	The Actor
2010	Sterling Knight	"Starstruck"	Christopher Wilde
2010	Anna Margaret	"Something About The Sunshine"	Himself

== Awards and nominations ==
Year	Award	Category	Work	Result
2010	Teen Choice Awards	Actor Comedy	Sonny with a Chance	Nominated
2010	Hollywood Teen TV Awards	Teen Pick Actor: Comedy	Sonny with a Chance	Won
2015	Monster Fest	Best Male Lead	Landmine Goes Click	Won
