= Yvonne Wood =

American costume designer (1914–1999)

- Born: September 27, 1914; Los Angeles, California, U.S.
- Died: January 14, 1999 (aged 84); Solvang, California, U.S.
- Occupation: Costume designer

Yvonne Wood (September 27, 1914 — January 14, 1999) was an American costume designer. She began her career at 20th Century Fox in 1943.

== Filmography ==
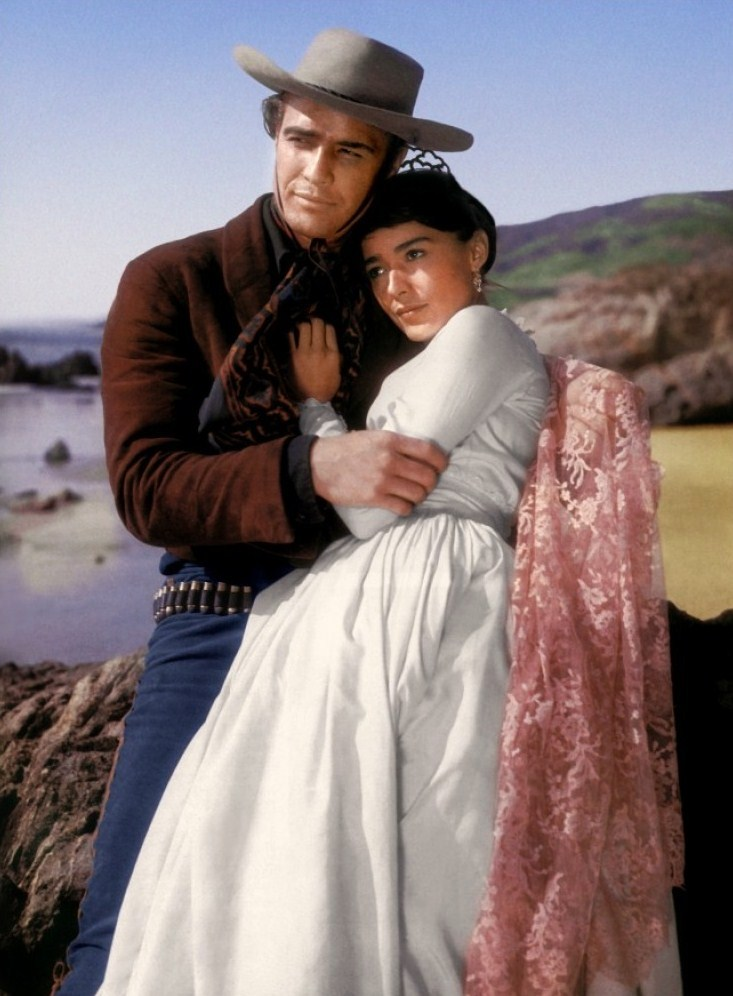
Marlon Brando & Pina Pellicer in One-Eyed Jacks.

as Costume Designer:

- Zoot Suit (1981)
- Quincy M.E. (1980) (TV)
- Captain America II (1979) (TV)
- Operation Petticoat (1979) (TV)
- B. J. and the Bear (1979) (TV)
- Black Beauty (1978) (TV)
- Harold Robbins' 79 Park Avenue (1977) (TV)
- The Oregon Trail (1977) (TV)
- Exo-Man (1977) (TV)
- The Rhinemann Exchange (1977) (TV)
- Delvecchio (1976) (TV)
- Baa Baa Black Sheep (1976) (TV)
- The Return of a Man Called Horse (1976)
- Night of Terror (1972) (TV)
- Dirty Dingus Magee (1970)
- The Cheyenne Social Club (1970)
- The Good Guys and the Bad Guys (1969)
- Guns for San Sebastian (1968)
- Firecreek (1968)
- Duel at Diablo (1966)
- Arrest and Trial (1963) (TV)
- One-Eyed Jacks (1961)
- The Big Country (1958)
- Man of the West (1958)
- The Court Jester (1955)
- Casanova's Big Night (1954)
- Red Garters (1954)
- Fort Algiers (1953)
- Raiders of the Seven Seas (1953)
- Botany Bay (1952)
- Captive Women (1952)
- Lady in the Iron Mask (1952)
- Double Crossbones (1950)
- Trípoli (1950)
- Shakedown (1950)
- Winchester '73 (1950)
- Sierra (1950)
- Comanche Territory (1950)
- Buccaneer's Girl (1950)
- Bagdad (1949)
- Abandoned (1949)
- The Gal Who Took the West (1949)
- Calamity Jane and Sam Bass (1949)
- Illegal Entry (1949)
- Criss Cross (1949)
- An Act of Murder (1948)
- Mexican Hayride (1948)
- Tap Roots
- River Lady (1948)
- Another Part of the Forest (1948)
- Casbah (1948)
- Black Bart (1948)
- Ride the Pink Horse (1947)
- Slave Girl (1947)
- The Web (1947)
- Buck Privates Come Home (1947)
- Song of Scheherazade (1947)
- Swell Guy (1946)
- White Tie and Tails (1946)
- Johnny Comes Flying Home (1946)
- Doll Face (1945)
- They Were Expendable (1945)
- A Bell for Adano (1945)
- Don Juan Quilligan (1945)
- Molly and Me (1945)
- Circumstantial Evidence (1945)
- Thunderhead, Son of Flicka (1945)
- Something for the Boys (1944)
- Greenwich Village (1944)
- The Big Noise (1944)
- Sweet and Low-Down (1944)
- Bermuda Mystery (1944)
- Tampico (1944)
- Four Jills in a Jeep (1944)
- The Purple Heart (1944)
- The Gang's All Here (1943)

== Notable design projects ==
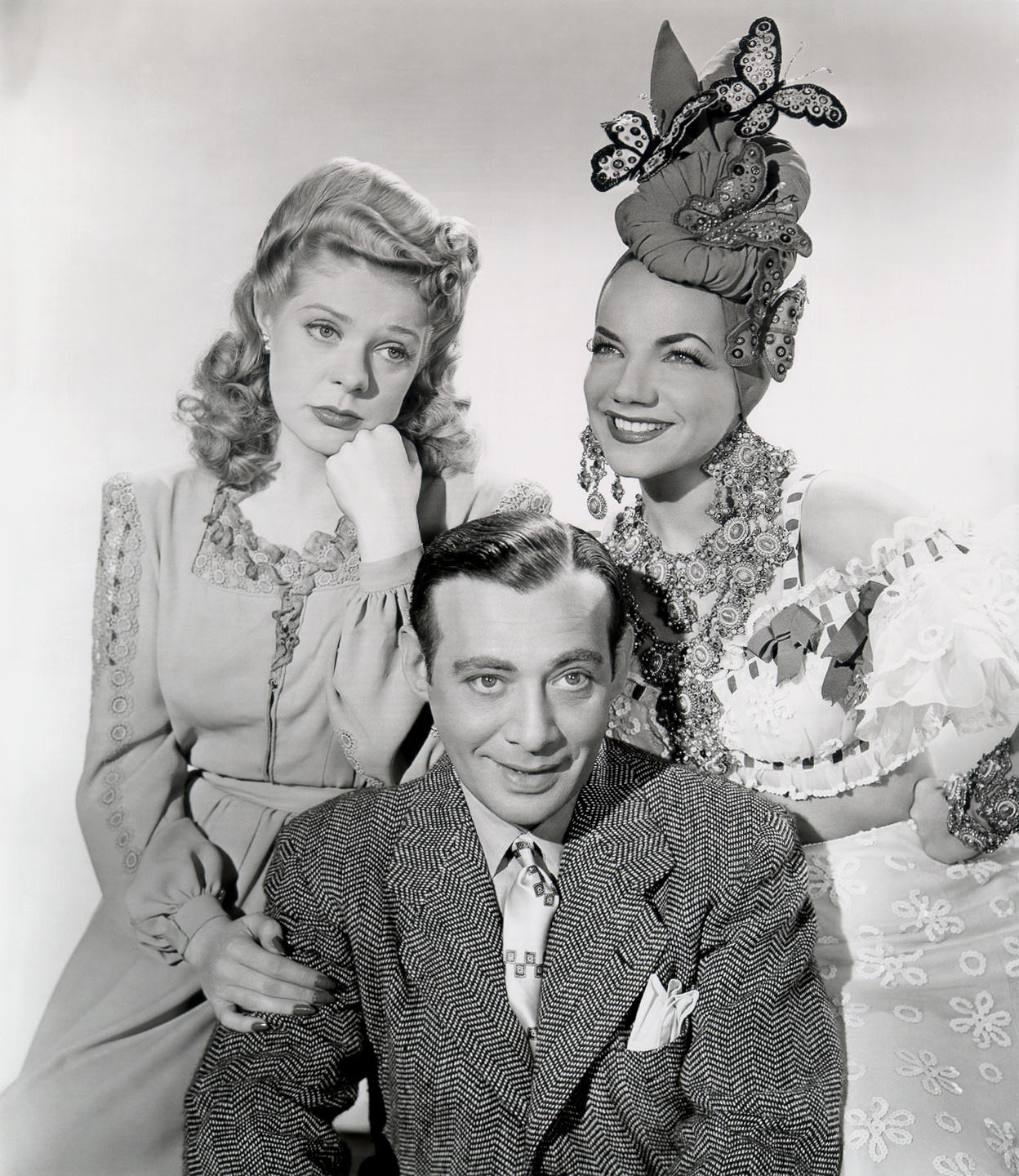
The Gang's All Here (1943): Alice Faye, Phil Baker and Carmen Miranda

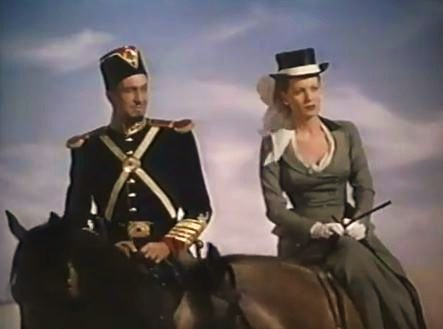
Bagdad (1949): Vincent Price and Maureen O'Hara

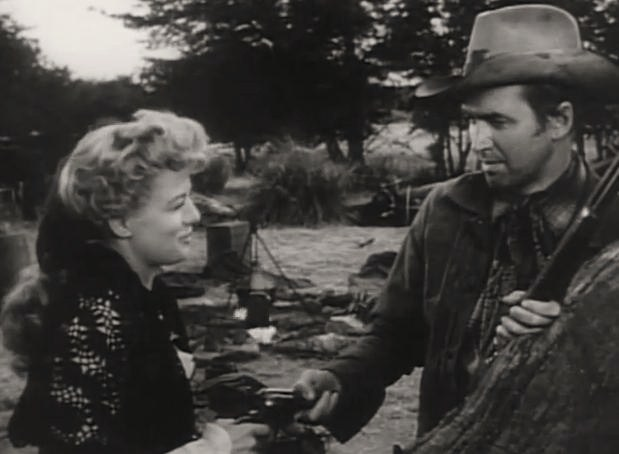
Winchester '73 (1950): Shelley Winters and James Stewart

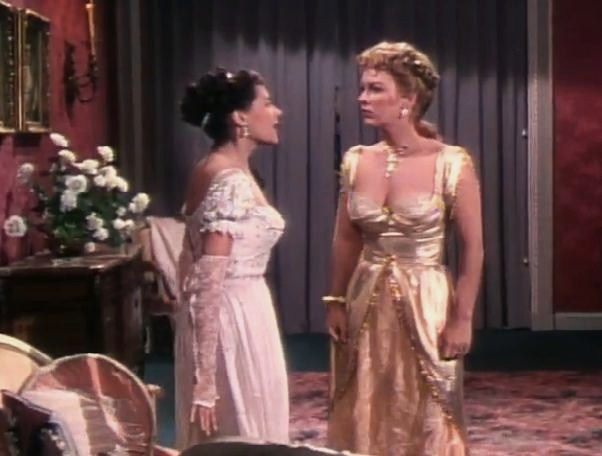
Buccaneer's Girl (1950): Yvonne De Carlo and Andrea King
