= Lizzie West =

American singer and songwriter (born 1973)

Lizzie West (born 1973) is an American singer and songwriter. She busked in the subways of New York City and traveled across the United States, before recording her debut album, Holy Road. She released the single "19 Miles to Baghdad" in 2004 during the Iraq War. Her second album was I Pledge Allegiance to Myself.

== Early life ==
Lizzie West was born in 1973 in Brooklyn, New York. West spent most of her early adult life traveling across the United States while writing stories and plays. She moved to London when she was 18. After returning to America four years later, in 1995, she purchased her first guitar from a pawn shop in Nashville. Upon returning to New York City the following year, she began performing her songs on street corners, subways, and her sister's bar, the Stinger, in Williamsburg, Brooklyn.

== Career ==
West's first tour of the United States came in the summer of 2000 in which she performed in bars and small clubs. Her song "Holy Road" also appeared in a commercial directed by Spike Lee. After touring again in April 2001 with the Kenny Wayne Shepherd Band and Double Trouble, she caught the attention of an A&R representative for major label Warner Bros. Records. A multi-album recording deal with Warner Bros. Records was made in August 2001.

Some of her songs have been featured in television shows and films. The 2002 film Secretary featured "Chariots Rise" on its soundtrack. The song was re-recorded for the film, with the lyrics "What a fool am I/To fall so in love" changed to "What grace have I/To fall so in love", as requested by director Steven Shainberg. The HBO feature Rock the Boat included the songs "Dusty Turnaround" and "Sometime". "Sometime" was also used in commercials advertising the show Dawson's Creek in 2003. NBC's Third Watch and ABC's Alias featured the song "Prayer", while "Doctor" was used in the WB drama Everwood.

Her debut album, Holy Road: Freedom Songs, was released in 2003 on Warner Bros. Records. This album earned her the title of Breakout Artist of the Year by both AOL and Entertainment Weekly. It was recorded with her former band, the Gangs of Kosmos. Popular songs on the album include "Dusty Turnaround", "Sometime", and "Holy Road".

Her second album, I Pledge Allegiance To Myself, was released in 2006 by Appleseed Records. A film entitled Holy Road: The Movie which describes Lizzie West, her touring, personal experiences, and musical career was in production around the time of her first album release. However, this project was likely abandoned since her departure from Warner Bros. Records.

Lizzie West was also involved in a podcast called The Holy Road Medicine Show with her husband, Baba. West was also involved with a webcast called "This Abundant Life" with her husband, Baba.

== Discography ==
=== Albums ===
- Holy Road: Freedom Songs (2003)
- I Pledge Allegiance to Myself (2006) – feat. the White Buffalo (Anthony Kieraldo)
- The Tumbleweed Cabaret: Dream #1 (2008)

=== Extended plays ===
- West (2002)
- Chariots Rise (2009)
- Thank You for Giving Us... (2011)

=== Singles ===
- "Holy Road" (1999)
