= 79 Park Avenue =

1977 American television miniseries

- Based on: 79 Park Avenue by Harold Robbins
- Developed by: Richard De Roy
- Written by: Richard De Roy; Jack Guss; Lionel E. Siegel
- Directed by: Paul Wendkos
- Starring: Lesley Ann Warren; Marc Singer; David Dukes
- Composer: Nelson Riddle
- Country of origin: United States
- Original language: English
- No. of episodes: 3

Production
- Executive producer: George Eckstein
- Producer: Paul Wendkos
- Cinematography: Enzo A. Martinelli
- Editors: Robert F. Shugrue; Rod Stephens
- Production companies: NBC Productions; Harold Robbins International Company

Original release
- Network: NBC
- Release: October 16 – October 18, 1977

79 Park Avenue, also known as Harold Robbins' 79 Park Avenue, is an American drama television miniseries developed and co-written by Richard De Roy, based on the 1955 novel of the same name by Harold Robbins. The miniseries stars Lesley Ann Warren as Marja Fludjicki, a poor but beautiful girl who is forced into prostitution despite sincere efforts to make a living and ultimately becomes New York City's most famous madam. It also stars Marc Singer and David Dukes.

Directed and produced by Paul Wendkos, the miniseries premiered on NBC on October 16, 1977, and concluded on October 18, 1977. Warren received critical acclaim and a Golden Globe Award for her performance.

== Cast ==
Starring

- Lesley Ann Warren as Marja Fludjicki/"Marianne"
- Marc Singer as Ross Savitch (eps. 1–2)
- David Dukes as Mike Koshiko

Guest stars

- Barbara Barrie as Kaati Fludjicki (ep. 1)
- Polly Bergen as Vera Keppler
- Raymond Burr as Armand Perfido (eps. 2–3)
- Michael Constantine as Ben Savitch
- Lloyd Haynes as John Stevens (ep. 3)
- Scott Jacoby as Paulie Fludjicki (eps. 2–3)
- Peter Marshall as Brian Whitfield (ep. 2)
- Alex Rocco as Frank Millerson (eps. 2–3)
- Albert Salmi as Peter Markevich (ep. 1)
- John Saxon as Harry Vito (eps. 1–2)
- Robert Webber as John Hackson DeWitt (ep. 3)
- Jack Weston as Joker Martin

Co-starring

- Sandy Helberg as Joey Rannis (eps. 1–2)
- Jane Marla Robbins as Frannie
- Margaret Fairchild as Myrna Savitch (ep. 1)
- Veronica Hamel as Laura Koshko (eps. 2–3)

== Production ==
It stars Lesley Ann Warren as a prostitute and Marc Singer as a gangster struggling to survive in the 1930s. David Dukes, Barbara Barrie, Raymond Burr, and Polly Bergen co-starred.

The teleplay was split among three writers, with Richard DeRoy doing the first part, Jack Guss the second, and Lionel E. Siegel the third.

== Reception ==
The show was a ratings success. Part I (which debuted on Sunday October 16, 1977) was the 10th most watched show in the United States for the week (22.3 rating, 16.3 million homes) and the ratings momentum jumped for the last two installments. Part II (Monday, October 17, 1977) was the second-most watched primetime show for the following week (29.9 rating, 21.8 million homes), and Part III (Tuesday October 18) was third. (27.7 rating, 20.2 million homes).

The critical reviews of the series were not positive, but not overly vicious, recognizing the series for what it was and no more. Tom Shales of The Washington Post called the series a "laughable tawdry throwback to movie eyebrow raisers of the '50s, though without any of their appealingly cheap panache. Television loves to raise the subject of sex and then avoid it like the plague." Joan Hanauer of UPI described the series as "what is usually called a 'woman's show'", meaning, "the romance is unrealistically sentimental and the moral tone is high, which in no way interferes with depicting the sleaziest kind of sex." She found the second installment to be strongest of the three.

And although he credited the performances of the lead actors, John J. O'Connor of The New York Times was also underwhelmed by the series, calling it an "already tired story ... manufactured for mass consumption with all of the artistic concern afforded a can of baked beans." O'Connor's year end review of 1977 television referred to 79 Park Avenue and Aspen as "dumb pot-boilers" which "tarnished considerably" the "promising concept of mini-series."

That the series might be somewhat controversial due to the sexual nature of the story was known from the beginning. Executive Producer George Eckstein admitted "broadcasting standards people got very apprehensive when it was announced that this property was going to be on TV." And when Fred Silverman took over at NBC in June 1978, he promised to stop lurid programming like 79 Park Avenue. Silverman stopped plans for a sequel to the miniseries and also halted a planned rerun in 1979.

== Awards and nominations ==
Year	Award	Category	Recipient	Result	Ref.
1978	35th Golden Globe Awards	Best Television Actress – Drama Series	Lesley Ann Warren	Won	
1978	30th Primetime Creative Arts Emmy Awards	Outstanding Achievement in Costume Design for a Drama or Comedy Series	Yvonne Wood	Nominated	
