= Starstruck (2010 film) =

2010 television film directed by Michael Grossman

- Extended edition US DVD cover
- Also known as: StarStruck
- Genre: Musical Teen drama
- Screenplay by: Barbara Johns; Annie DeYoung
- Story by: Barbara Johns
- Directed by: Michael Grossman
- Starring: Sterling Knight; Danielle Campbell; Maggie Castle; Brandon Mychal Smith; Chelsea Staub
- Theme music composer: David Lawrence
- Country of origin: United States
- Original language: English

Production
- Producer: Douglas Sloan
- Cinematography: Horacio Marquínez
- Editor: Tara Timpone
- Running time: 81 minutes
- Production companies: Close to Home Productions, LLC

Original release
- Network: Disney Channel
- Release: February 14, 2010

Starstruck, stylized as StarStruck, is a 2010 American teen musical drama television film starring Sterling Knight and Danielle Campbell that premiered as a Disney Channel Original Movie on February 14, 2010.

== Plot ==
Kalamazoo teenager Jessica Olson is jaded by her older sister Sara's obsession with teen pop idol Christopher Wilde. When visiting her grandmother in Hollywood during spring break, Sara drags her along to stalk Christopher, much to Jessica's chagrin. Meanwhile, Christopher is on the brink of landing a movie deal, though the director is reluctant to give him the role due to his recently earned reputation as a "spoiled punk" who often scuffles with paparazzi. In order to prove that he is serious about landing the role, Christopher agrees to remain out of the tabloids for a while.

Sara convinces Jessica to sneak out with her to crash the birthday party of Christopher's girlfriend, model Alexis Bender, where he is scheduled to perform. Christopher sneaks in and out of the party to avoid being caught, and hits Jessica with the exit door while she searches for Sara in the crowd. He takes Jessica to a hospital to make sure she hasn't suffered a concussion, then brings her to his Beverly Hills mansion so that he can make an appearance for the film director before taking her home. Jessica allows Christopher to stay in her grandmother's garage for the night when he learns the paparazzi have followed him. The next day, Sara brings Jessica to Malibu in the hopes of finding Christopher there. Jessica recognizes a disguised Christopher on the beach and approaches him, but the two are forced to make a quick exit from the beach when the paparazzi arrive; once they get away, Christopher shows Jessica around Los Angeles.

While attempting to return to Malibu, they are again spotted by the paparazzi, but manage to elude them by driving off the main road, losing Jessica's grandmother's car in a mud pool of quicksand in the process. While walking back to Malibu, they get into a heated argument after Jessica calls Christopher out on his superficiality. Eventually, Christopher confides that he enjoyed hanging out with Jessica because she appreciated him for who he was as a person rather than his fame. They eventually return to the beach, where they almost kiss until Christopher realizes he could be recognized and panics. He tells Jessica that they can never speak to each other again, and that no one can know what happened between them that day. Heartbroken and angry, Jessica returns home with her family. Alexis finds out about Jessica and breaks up with Christopher.

Christopher later finds out that paparazzi have documented his and Jessica's relationship, and is persuaded by his parents/managers Daniel and Sheri to lie and say she was just a fan. Meanwhile, as Jessica is flocked by paparazzi at her house in Kalamazoo, she watches him tell a talk show host that he has never met Jessica. Furious at the way the media has forced Christopher to suppress his real self, she confronts the paparazzi and rebukes them for their dehumanization and objectification of celebrities. However, she becomes infamous for supposedly "lying" about having met Christopher. Christopher's best friend, Albert Joshua "Stubby" Stubbins, encourages Christopher to make his own choices. Christopher then turns down the movie role and fires his parents as his managers.

Later, Sara takes Jessica to the school dance with her. Christopher makes an appearance at the dance and apologizes to Jessica on stage as well as singing a song he had written for her. When the paparazzi appear at the dance, he confesses that he was the one who lied, and admits his feelings for Jessica. She forgives him and the two agree to go out on a proper date.

== Cast ==
- Sterling Knight as Christopher Wilde
- Danielle Campbell as Jessica Olson
- Maggie Castle as Sara Olson
- Brandon Mychal Smith as Albert Joshua "Stubby" Stubbins
- Chelsea Staub as Alexis Bender
- Matt Winston as Alan Smith
- Toni Trucks as Libby Lam
- Abbie Cobb as AJ
- Beth Littleford as Barbara Olson
- Dan O'Connor as Dean Olson
- Alice Hirson as Grandma Olson
- Lauren Bowles as Sheri Wilde
- Ron Pearson as Daniel Wilde
- Hugh Dane as Howard
- Sunkrish Bala as Dr. Sanjay Lad

== Production ==
The film was shot in 2009 on location in Los Angeles, California.

== Reception ==
The movie premiere generated 6.0 million viewers, the first to debut on a Sunday night, becoming the channel's most-watched February original movie premiere in Total Viewers, Kids 6–11 and Teenagers. Disney Channel's highest numbers ever in the time period among teens (2.3 million), and second-highest on record in Total Viewers (6.0 million) and Kids 6–11 (2.4 million), behind only the August 19, 2007 encore of High School Musical 2. There were 987,000 viewers when it premiered in the UK and Ireland on May 14, 2010.

== Soundtrack ==
Starstruck

Soundtrack album by Various artists
- Released: February 9, 2010
- Recorded: 2009
- Genres: Pop rock, teen pop
- Length: 37:43
- Label: Walt Disney
- Producer: Various artists

Singles from Starstruck
- 1. "Starstruck" Released: January 27, 2010; 2. "Hero" Released: February 12, 2010

Professional ratings
Review scores
Source	Rating
AllMusic	2.5/5 stars

The soundtrack was released on February 9, 2010 by Walt Disney Records. The soundtrack peaked at number 23 on the U.S. Billboard 200. It debuted at #98 on Billboard 200 chart with the sales of 8,257 copies. For the week ending of March 6, 2010, the soundtrack faced a surplus in sales, selling 19,058 copies (up 131 percent), it rose from #98 to #23 on Billboard 200 chart. Sterling Knight, who portrays Christopher Wilde in the film, only sings the title track on the soundtrack with the rest of the songs being performed by then Varsity Fanclub member Drew Ryan Scott. Knight stated that the reason for this was because he had joined the film's cast late.

=== Track listing ===
Standard edition
No.	Title	Performed by	Length
1.	"Starstruck" (voiced by Sterling Knight)	Christopher Wilde	2:58
2.	"Shades" (voiced by Drew Ryan Scott)	Christopher Wilde & Stubby	3:03
3.	"Hero" (voiced by Drew Ryan Scott)	Christopher Wilde	3:17
4.	"What You Mean to Me" (voiced by Drew Ryan Scott)	Christopher Wilde	4:17
5.	"Something About the Sunshine" (voiced by Drew Ryan Scott)	Christopher Wilde & Anna Margaret	3:07
6.	"Party Up"	Stubby	3:16
7.	"Got to Believe" (voiced by Drew Ryan Scott)	Christopher Wilde	3:20
8.	"Hero" (unplugged; voiced by Drew Ryan Scott)	Christopher Wilde	2:33
9.	"Something About the Sunshine" (solo version)	Anna Margaret	3:06
10.	"New Boyfriend"	Anna Margaret	3:05
11.	"Welcome to Hollywood"	Mitchel Musso	2:29
12.	"Make a Movie"	Jasmine Sagginario	3:10
Total length:			37:43

=== Charts ===
Chart (2010)	Peak position
Greek Top Albums Chart	23
Hungarian Albums (MAHASZ)	38
Mexican Top Albums Chart	25
Polish Top Albums Chart	49
Spain Top Albums Chart	79
U.S. Billboard 200	23
U.S. Kid Albums	1
U.S. Top Soundtracks	3
U.S. Top Digital Albums	6
UK Soundtrack Albums Chart	1
