= Head Cases =

- Genre: Legal drama Comedy drama
- Created by: Bill Chais
- Starring: Chris O'Donnell; Adam Goldberg; Krista Allen; Richard Kind; Rhea Seehorn; Jake Cherry; Rockmond Dunbar
- Composers: Wendy Melvoin; Lisa Coleman
- Country of origin: United States
- Original language: English
- No. of seasons: 1
- No. of episodes: 7 (5 unaired)

Production
- Executive producers: Bill Chais; Barry Josephson; Jeff Rake
- Running time: 60 minutes
- Production companies: Jeff Rake Productions; Josephson Entertainment; 20th Century Fox Television

Original release
- Network: Fox
- Release: September 14 – September 21, 2005

Head Cases is an American legal comedy drama television series that aired during the 2005–06 season. It was broadcast by Fox and aired from September 14 to 21, 2005. Only two episodes were aired before it was canceled due to extremely low ratings.

== Premise ==
The program starred Chris O'Donnell as Jason Payne, who was a superstar attorney at a prestigious law firm until his career put a strain on his marriage. Eventually, Payne had a nervous breakdown and was sent to a "wellness center" where he recovered. Upon leaving the center, Payne's therapist "buddied him up" with another patient and lawyer, Russell Shultz (played by Adam Goldberg), who suffered from explosive disorder. As Payne's world continued to crumble around him, he found that his only friend seems to be Shultz. Ultimately, Payne and Shultz decided to open a law firm of their own.

O'Donnell, who is best known for more of his film work, was quoted in a TV Guide article about his reasons for trying a television series:

I'd been taking a break [from movies] when this script kind of fell in my lap. I read it and loved it. It's a terrific character, plus I couldn't be more excited to work with the cast that's been put together.

I've got three kids, and my oldest is starting kindergarten, so the idea of being in one place was very appealing to me.

The program was created by Bill Chais, who along with Barry Josephson and Jeff Rake served as executive producers.

== Cast ==
- Chris O'Donnell as Jason Payne
- Adam Goldberg as Russell Shultz
- Richard Kind as Lou Albertini
- Rhea Seehorn as Nicole Walker
- Rockmond Dunbar as Dr. Robinson
- Krista Allen as Laurie Payne
- Jake Cherry as Ryan Payne

== Episodes ==
No.	Title	Directed by	Written by	Original release date	Prod. code
1	"Pilot"	Andrew Fleming	Bill Chais	September 14, 2005	1AKP79
Jason Payne is introduced as a successful, young attorney working for a well-respected firm. However, after his wife, Laurie, kicks him out of the house due to him not being a good husband and father, he suffers from a nervous breakdown. Payne then enlists for help in a mental institution. His doctor, Dr. Robinson, decides after two months there that Payne is stable enough to leave the center. On his release, however, Dr. Robinson buddies Payne up with Russell Shultz, another lawyer who suffers from explosive disorder. Payne returns to his employer, only to find that he has been let go. To help Payne out, Shultz gives him a stack of cases that might need an attorney. Eventually, Payne is able to represent a lady who is getting a divorce from her husband. Coincidentally, his previous employer is representing the husband. Shultz also is involved in a case. His deals with a lady who has been fired from her employer due to her history of sleeping with various coworkers. During the entire episode, Payne is irritated by Shultz and his actions. However, the episode ends with Payne and Shultz finally going into practice together.
2	"S(elf) Help"	Craig Zisk	Bill Chais	September 21, 2005	1AKP01
A former babysitter of Payne's son, Madeline Barton, comes to ask Jason for his help with her husband's case. Her husband, Ken, is a member of the Earth Liberation Front (ELF) and has been charged with the arson of her father's, Al Girard, car dealership. Ken states, however, that he has been set up. Payne does not want to take the case, but Shultz does, and the duo ends up representing him. Eventually it is revealed that Madeline's mother, Barbara Girard, actually committed the crime because she (as well as her husband) did not approve of Madeline and Ken's marriage. Another motive for the arson was to pay off a bookie that Mr. Girard owed a large amount of money to. After they collected the insurance, Mrs. Girard felt the troubles with the bookie could be taken care of. Also in this episode, Lou Albertini is introduced. He is a former successful attorney that Shultz knows. He is hired in as a paralegal, but takes on private investigator responsibilities as well. Payne also talks with his former secretary, Nicole Walker, about coming to work for him at his new practice. At first she refuses, but later agrees to join.
3	"Malpractice Makes Perfect"	TBD	Jeff Rake	UNAIRED	1AKP02
4	"In the Club"	TBD	TBD	UNAIRED	1AKP03
5	"A Line Crossed"	TBD	Kevin Falls	UNAIRED	1AKP04
6	"Be Your Best You"	TBD	Bridget Carpenter	UNAIRED	1AKP05
7	"Deep Cover"	TBD	Bill Chais	UNAIRED	1AKP06

== Reception ==
The show placed fourth in the ratings in its first week against an all-rerun competition. Its second week was even worse against season premieres on the other networks, including Lost and America's Next Top Model. It only outrated a rerun of the pilot episode for the since-cancelled Just Legal on The WB.

Tom Shales of the Washington Post began his review of the pilot as follows:

"Sometimes bad things just happen, and it's nobody's fault," says one of the characters in Head Cases, a new Fox courtroom drama. Unfortunately that sounds an awful lot like the producer of the show attempting to let himself off the hook.

What's sad is that Head Cases, unlike the previous Fox series that have already made their premieres, has real promise and potential, especially in the character of young lawyer Jason Payne, as earnest Chris O'Donnell plays him.

The USA Today review was less kind:

Some shows just make you want to head in the opposite direction. With Head Cases, the driving-away force is equal parts concept and cast. You'd be unlikely to rush toward any show about two recently institutionalized lawyers, forced into partnership by therapist blackmail. But Fox doesn't help its case by hiring Adam Goldberg and Chris O'Donnell, who seem ill-equipped to head this or any series, individually or collectively.
