= The Positively True Adventures of the Alleged Texas Cheerleader-Murdering Mom =

TV movie

- DVD cover
- Genre: Biography; Black comedy Thriller
- Written by: Jane Anderson
- Directed by: Michael Ritchie
- Starring: Holly Hunter; Beau Bridges; Swoosie Kurtz
- Music by: Lucy Simon
- Country of origin: United States
- Original language: English

Production
- Executive producers: Kyle A. Heinrich; Frederick S. Pierce
- Producers: James Manos Jr. Art Schaefer; Zachary Feuer; Dana Cole
- Production location: Channelview, Texas
- Cinematography: Gerry Fisher
- Editor: Eric A. Sears
- Running time: 99 minutes
- Production companies: Frederick S. Pierce Company; HBO Pictures; Sudden Entertainment

Original release
- Release: April 10, 1993

The Positively True Adventures of the Alleged Texas Cheerleader-Murdering Mom is a 1993 biographical black comedy television film produced by and for HBO. It was directed by Michael Ritchie and starred Holly Hunter, Swoosie Kurtz, and Beau Bridges.

It is based on the true story of Wanda Holloway, a woman who tried to put a hit on one of her daughter's classmates (and/or the girl's mother) to advance her own daughter's Middle school cheerleading career.

== Plot ==
The film takes place in Channelview, Texas. When Wanda Holloway was a teen, her father forbade her to try out for her school's cheerleading team. Many years later, when Wanda had her own daughter, she was determined that her daughter would fulfill the dream she was denied and become a cheerleader—which would allow Wanda to make up that part of her childhood by reliving it through her daughter.

Wanda enrolls her daughter Shanna in various dance and gymnastics classes in order to enhance her prospects of becoming a cheerleader. She forces Shanna to practice for hours on end, despite sickness or injury. Wanda's best friend Verna Heath and her daughter Amber live next door to the Holloway family. Amber is the same age as Shanna and the two become friends. Verna had been a successful varsity twirler when she was young and holds the same ambition as Wanda for her own daughter.

Leading up to the cheerleading tryouts, jealousy sparks between Wanda and Verna, despite the fact that their daughters' friendship remains solid. In the months prior to the tryouts, Wanda forces Shanna to concentrate completely on cheer-leading. At the tryouts, Amber impresses the judges but Shanna is unable to, despite all of her training. Amber makes the squad and Shanna does not, disappointing both Shanna and Wanda. The fact that Shanna did not make it onto the team causes Wanda to end the friendship between Shanna and Amber. Wanda does not give up on seeing her daughter become a cheerleader, and decides to try again next year.

Every day until next year's tryouts, Shanna practices frequently at her mother's command. When the time arrives, Amber makes the team and is even promoted to co-captain, but Shanna is disqualified because of her mother's attempts to bribe the judges and other students. The shock of her daughter's failure for the second time puts Wanda into a mad fit of rage, anger and jealousy. Wanda decides that if it was not for Amber, Shanna would have definitely been a cheerleader. She becomes obsessed with the notion that living next door to talented Amber had sapped Shanna's confidence and ruined her chances of success.

Wanda meets her brother-in-law Terry to take a hit out on Amber and Verna. Terry is horrified by Wanda's hate for a thirteen-year-old girl, and disagrees with the murder of a young vibrant girl—especially over something as petty as cheerleading. After the rendezvous, Terry decides to turn Wanda in to the police. He meets Wanda again, this time with a tape recorder in order to obtain proof of Wanda's desire to commit homicide. Terry sends the recorded message, along with background information, to the police. Wanda is arrested and sentenced to fifteen years in prison, but is set free when it is discovered that a member of the jury at her trial was on probation. Wanda serves only six months for the attempted murder of Amber.

In the end, Shanna decides it would be best to quit trying out for the cheerleading team. Presently, Shanna and Wanda reside in California, where Shanna is taking classes in modelling, singing and acting. Wanda hopes that one day, her daughter will be a famous Hollywood actress, no matter what it takes.

== Cast ==
- Holly Hunter as Wanda Holloway
- Beau Bridges as Terry Harper
- Swoosie Kurtz as Marla Harper
- Elizabeth Ruscio as Verna Heath
- Gregg Henry as Tony Harper
- Matt Frewer as Troy McKinney
- Eddie Jones as C.D. Holloway
- Frankie Ingrassia as Shanna Harper
- Gary Grubbs as Detective Helton
- Jack Kehler as Sergeant F.E. Blackwell
- Frederick Koehler as Shane Harper

== Reception ==
Reception for the film was positive. Entertainment Weekly praising the film stating "the movie gets its real kick when it comes time for everyone to sell their rights to Hollywood... with one writer remarking she has 'Holly Hunter' in mind for the lead." However, People magazine's review stated that the movie "has two good performances" but that it "just doesn't seem to have much point." Roger Ebert recommended the film as Video of the Week on At the Movies.

Television critic Matt Zoller Seitz in his 2016 book co-written with Alan Sepinwall titled TV (The Book) named the film as the 2nd greatest American TV-movie of all time, behind Steven Spielberg's Duel. He stated that "this is a serio-comic (emphasis on serio-) account of a real and bizarre crime, but also a satire on media ethics and the entertainment industry's insatiable tendency to turn real people's pain into entertainment.... The film is self aware from start to finish ... yet it never loses track of the pathetic and tragic aspects of the story, and it never condescends to its small-town characters".

== Accolades ==
Year	Award	Category	Nominee(s)	Result	Ref.
1993	Artios Awards	Best Casting for TV Movie of the Week	Richard Pagano, Sharon Bialy and Debi Manwiller	Nominated	
1993	Primetime Emmy Awards	Outstanding Made for Television Movie	Kyle A. Heinrich, Frederick S. Pierce and James Manos Jr.	Nominated	
1993	Primetime Emmy Awards	Outstanding Lead Actress in a Miniseries or a Special	Holly Hunter	Won	
1993	Primetime Emmy Awards	Outstanding Supporting Actor in a Miniseries or a Special	Beau Bridges	Won	
1993	Primetime Emmy Awards	Outstanding Individual Achievement in Directing for a Miniseries or a Special	Michael Ritchie	Nominated	
1993	Primetime Emmy Awards	Outstanding Individual Achievement in Writing for a Miniseries or a Special	Jane Anderson	Won	
1993	Primetime Emmy Awards	Outstanding Individual Achievement in Sound Editing for a Miniseries or a Special	Joe Melody, Tim Terusa, Gary Macheel, Richard Steele, Bob Costanza, David C. Eichhorn, Billy B. Bell, Rusty Tinsley, Mike Dickeson, Dan Luna, Kristi Johns and Allan K. Rosen	Nominated	
1994	American Cinema Editors Awards	Best Edited Motion Picture for Non-Commercial Television	Eric A. Sears	Nominated	
1994	CableACE Awards	Movie or Miniseries	Kyle A. Heinrich, Frederick S. Pierce and James Manos Jr.	Won	
1994	CableACE Awards	Actress in a Movie or Miniseries	Holly Hunter	Won	
1994	CableACE Awards	Directing for a Movie or Miniseries	Michael Ritchie	Nominated	
1994	CableACE Awards	Writing for a Movie or Miniseries	Jane Anderson	Nominated	
1994	Directors Guild of America Awards	Outstanding Directorial Achievement in Dramatic Specials	Michael Ritchie	Won	
1994	Golden Globe Awards	Best Actress in a Miniseries or Motion Picture Made for Television	Holly Hunter	Nominated	
1994	Golden Globe Awards	Best Supporting Actor in a Series, Miniseries or Motion Picture Made for Television	Beau Bridges	Won	
1994	Writers Guild of America Awards	Original Long Form	Jane Anderson	Won	
