= Boston Society of Film Critics Awards 2002 =

Annual US film awards ceremony

23rd BSFC Awards

December 15, 2002

Best Film:
The Pianist

The 23rd Boston Society of Film Critics Awards, honoring the best in film in 2002, were given on 15 December 2002.

== Winners ==
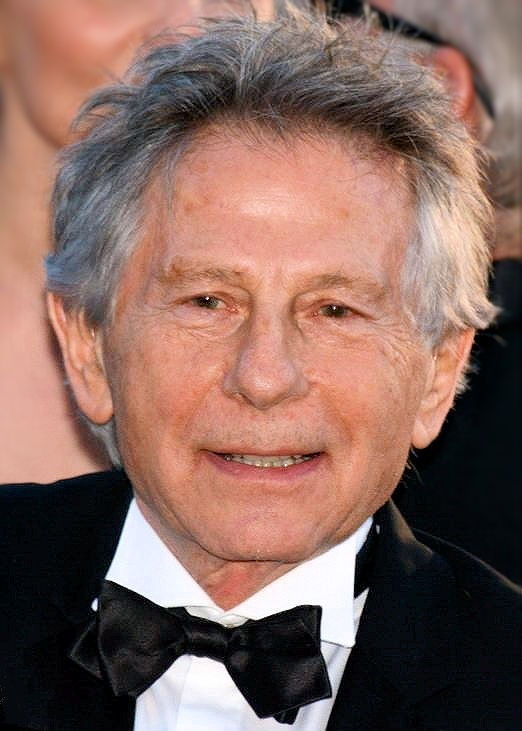
Roman Polanski, Best Director winner

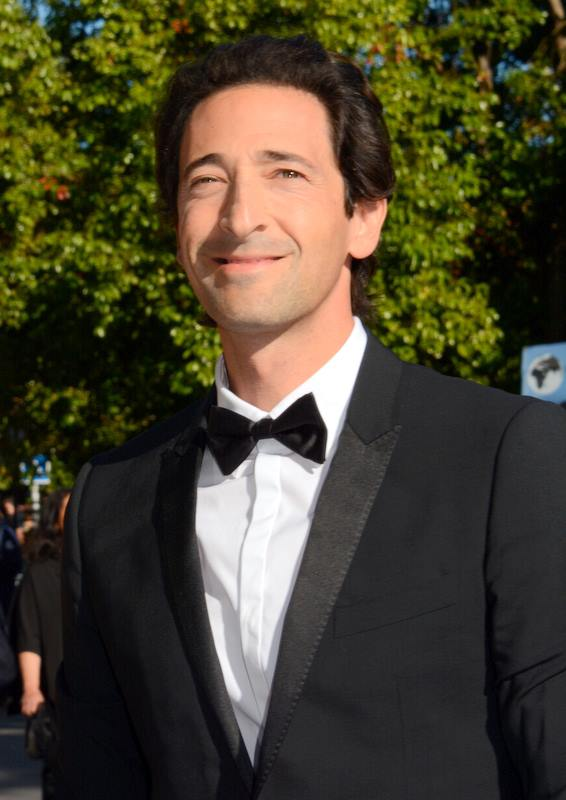
Adrien Brody, Best Actor winner

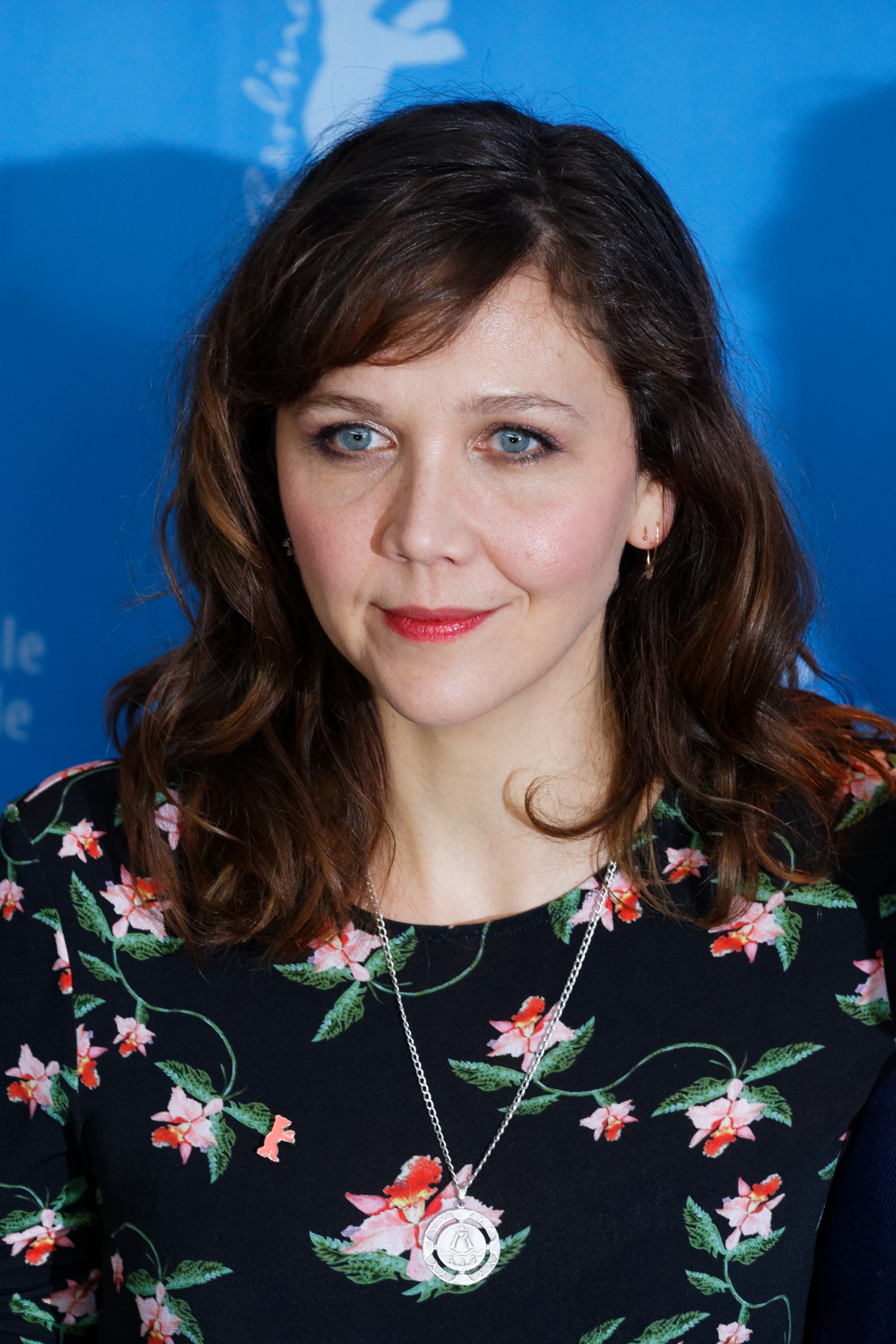
Maggie Gyllenhaal, Best Actress winner

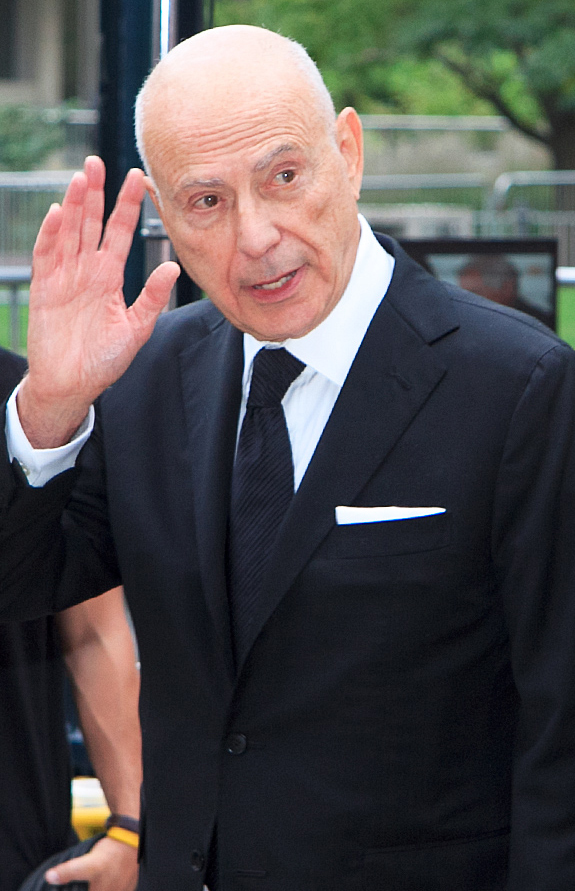
Alan Arkin, Best Supporting Actor winner

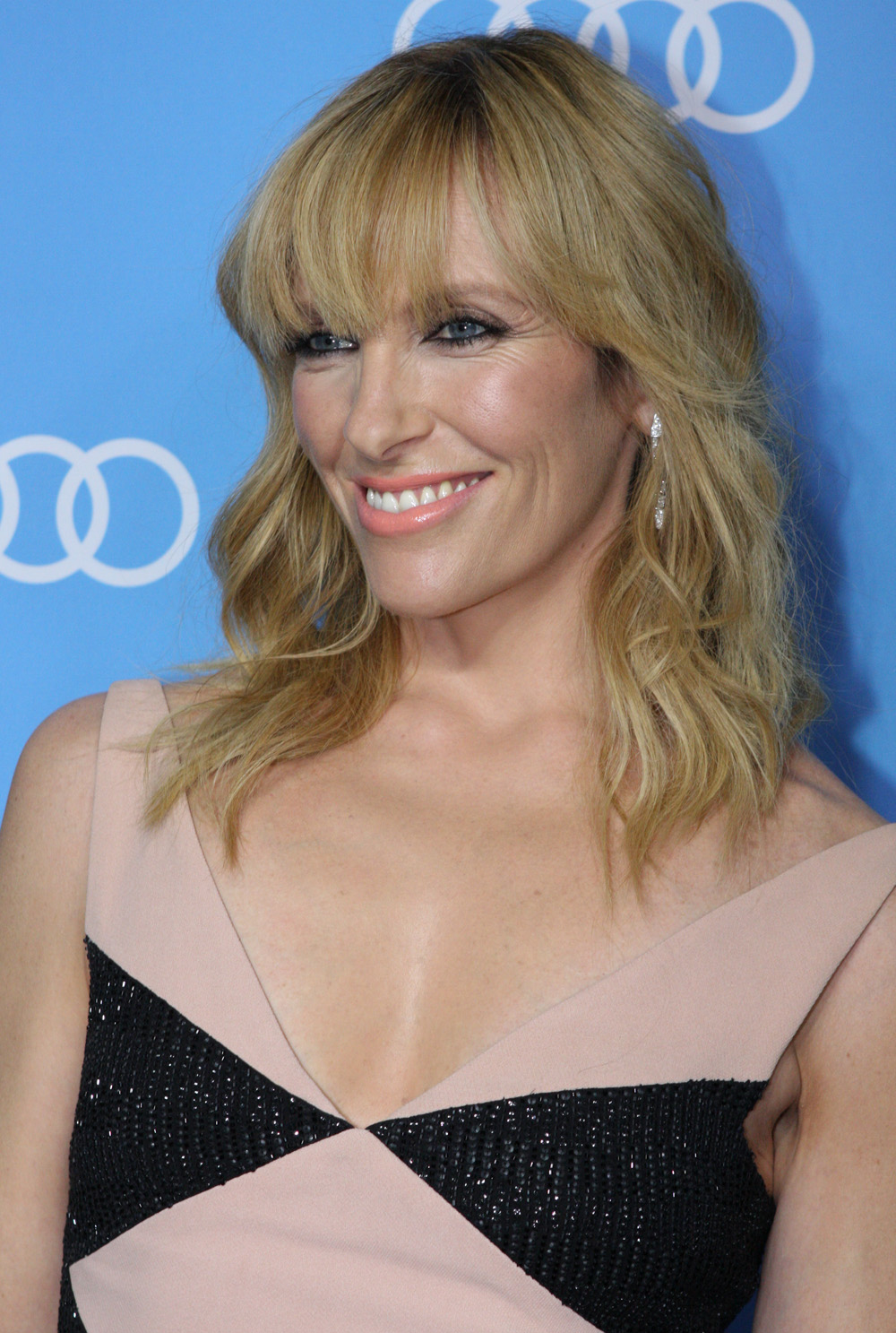
Toni Collette, Best Supporting Actress winner

- Best Film:
  - The Pianist
  - Runner-up: Gangs of New York
- Best Actor:
  - Adrien Brody – The Pianist
  - Runner-up: Daniel Day-Lewis – Gangs of New York
- Best Actress:
  - Maggie Gyllenhaal – Secretary
  - Runner-up: Julianne Moore – Far from Heaven
- Best Supporting Actor:
  - Alan Arkin – Thirteen Conversations About One Thing
  - Runner-up: John C. Reilly – Chicago, Gangs of New York, The Good Girl and The Hours
- Best Supporting Actress:
  - Toni Collette – About a Boy and The Hours
  - Runner-up: Catherine Zeta-Jones – Chicago
- Best Director:
  - Roman Polanski – The Pianist
  - Runner-up: Martin Scorsese – Gangs of New York
- Best Screenplay:
  - Charlie and Donald Kaufman – Adaptation.
- Best Cinematography:
  - Edward Lachman – Far from Heaven
- Best Documentary:
  - The Kid Stays in the Picture
- Best Foreign-Language Film:
  - Y Tu Mamá También • Mexico/USA
- Best New Filmmaker:
  - Peter Care – The Dangerous Lives of Altar Boys
