= Night at the Museum (franchise) =

American media franchise

- Franchise logo
- Created by: Robert Ben Garant; Thomas Lennon
- Original work: Night at the Museum (2006)
- Owner: 20th Century Studios
- Years: 2006–present
- Based on: The Night at the Museum and Another Night at the Museum by Milan Trenc

Print publications
- Novels: Night at the Museum: The Junior Novelization (2006); Night at the Museum: Battle of the Smithsonian: The Junior Novelization (2009); Nick's Tales: Night of the Dragons (2011); Nick's Tales: Night of the Giants (2013); Night at the Museum: Secret of the Tomb: The Junior Novelization (2014)

Films and television
- Films: Night at the Museum (2006); Night at the Museum: Battle of the Smithsonian (2009); Night at the Museum: Secret of the Tomb (2014); Night at the Museum: Kahmunrah Rises Again (2022)

Games
- Video game: Night at the Museum: Battle of the Smithsonian (2009)

Night at the Museum is an American media franchise of fantasy-comedy films based on the 1993 children's book by Milan Trenc, directed by Shawn Levy and written by Robert Ben Garant and Thomas Lennon. Starring Ben Stiller as a museum night security guard named Larry Daley, the first three films also star an ensemble cast featuring Robin Williams, Owen Wilson, Ricky Gervais, Steve Coogan, Patrick Gallagher, Rami Malek, Mizuo Peck, Mickey Rooney, Bill Cobbs, Brad Garrett and Dick Van Dyke, while the video game and 4th film feature a recast ensemble of voice actors.

== Films ==
=== Night at the Museum (2006) ===
When Larry Daley (Ben Stiller), a divorced father who was having trouble finding a job, applies for a job at the American Museum of Natural History, he is assigned as a night guard. However, a seemingly easy job turns out to be a wild ride when he finds that an ancient spell has caused the exhibits of the museum to come to life.

=== Night at the Museum: Battle of the Smithsonian (2009) ===
Three years after the first film, several of the exhibits are transferred to the Smithsonian in Washington, D.C., and Dexter the monkey steals the tablet of Ahkmenrah. Larry must break in and team up with his old friends, and new ally Amelia Earhart, to get it back from Ahkmenrah's resurrected evil older brother Kahmunrah before morning.

=== Night at the Museum: Secret of the Tomb (2014) ===
Five years after the second film, Larry discovers that the tablet of Ahkmenrah's magic is failing. He and his now-teenage son Nick, along with Teddy Roosevelt, Sacagawea, Jedediah, Octavius, Dexter, Attila the Hun, and a new caveman figure named Laaa (who looks like Larry) travel to the British Museum in London to undo the curse, with the help of Ahkmenrah's parents and the narcissistic Sir Lancelot of Camelot, before the tablet's magic disappears forever.

=== Night at the Museum: Kahmunrah Rises Again (2022) ===
The story follows Nick Daley, the teenage son of Larry Daley (the former night guard of the American Museum of Natural History), as he takes on the role of night watchman at the museum. Like his father, Nick quickly discovers that the exhibits come to life at night thanks to a magical Egyptian tablet.

Nick struggles with anxiety and self-doubt but is determined to prove himself. His fears are put to the test when Kahmunrah, the villainous pharaoh from Night at the Museum: Battle of the Smithsonian, escapes his underground tomb. Kahmunrah has plans to unleash the Egyptian underworld and take over the world with an army of the undead. To stop him, Nick teams up with the familiar living exhibits, including Teddy Roosevelt, Sacagawea, Attila the Hun, Laaa the caveman, and Joan of Arc, in a comedic and action-packed adventure. Together, they must prevent Kahmunrah from opening a portal to the underworld and destroying the world.

=== Future ===
Thomas Lennon hinted that another film could be developed and expressed interest in doing another live-action film with Ben Stiller. He added that the animated film "opens up a lot of new possibilities".

In July 2025, The Hollywood Reporter confirmed that a new live-action Night at the Museum film is in the works. The project is being produced by Shawn Levy's production company, 21 Laps Entertainment. Levy, will serve as a producer alongside Dan Levine and Emily Morris. Tripper Clancy has been hired to write the screenplay. The film is expected to introduce a new set of characters and historical figures, marking a creative shift from the original films.

== Main cast and characters ==
List indicators

This section includes characters who will appear or have appeared in the series.

- An empty grey cell indicates the character was not in the film, or that the character's official presence has not yet been confirmed.
- ^{C} indicates a cameo role.
- ^{E} indicates an appearance not included in the theatrical cut.
- ^{U} indicates an uncredited appearance.
- ^{V} indicates a voice-only role.
- ^{Y} indicates a younger version of the character.

Characters	Films				Video game
Characters	Night at the Museum	Night at the Museum: Battle of the Smithsonian	Night at the Museum: Secret of the Tomb	Night at the Museum: Kahmunrah Rises Again	Night at the Museum: Battle of the Smithsonian
Characters	2006	2009	2014	2022	2009
Recurring characters
Lawrence "Larry" Daley	Ben Stiller	Ben Stiller	Ben Stiller	Zachary Levi	Ben Stiller
Theodore Roosevelt	Robin Williams (Note: Williams also portrays a bronze statue of Theodore Roosevelt's head from the Smithsonian Museum in Night at the Museum: Battle of the Smithsonian (2009).)	Robin Williams	Robin Williams	Thomas Lennon	Mark Moseley
Nicholas "Nick" Daley	Jake Cherry	Jake Cherry	Skyler Gisondo	Joshua Bassett	Jake Cherry
Jedediah	Owen Wilson	Owen Wilson	Owen Wilson	Steve Zahn	Dustin Leighton
Octavius	Steve Coogan	Steve Coogan	Steve Coogan	Jack Whitehall	Dave Wittenberg
Dr. Leslie McPhee	Ricky Gervais	Ricky Gervais	Ricky Gervais	Jamie Demetriou	Ricky Gervais
Attila	Patrick Gallagher	Patrick Gallagher	Patrick Gallagher	Alexander Salamat	Jim Cummings
Sacagawea	Mizuo Peck	Mizuo Peck	Mizuo Peck	Kieran Sequoia	Mizuo Peck
Dexter	Crystal the Monkey	Crystal the Monkey	Crystal the Monkey	Dee Bradley Baker	Dee Bradley Baker
Easter Island Head	Brad Garrett^{V}	Brad Garrett^{V}	Brad Garrett^{V}	Kelemete Misipeka	Jim Cummings; Brad Garrett
Ahkmenrah	Rami Malek	Rami Malek	Rami Malek		Crispin Freeman
Cecil "C. J." Fredericks	Dick Van Dyke	Dick Van Dyke^{E}^{C}	Dick Van Dyke Percy Hynes White^{Y}		
Gus	Mickey Rooney	Mickey Rooney^{E}^{C}	Mickey Rooney		
Reginald	Bill Cobbs	Bill Cobbs^{E}^{C}	Bill Cobbs		
Erica Daley	Kim Raver			Gillian Jacobs	
Kahmunrah		Hank Azaria		Joseph Kamal	Marc Graue Hank Azaria
Amelia Earhart / Tess		Amy Adams			Molly Hagan
Ivan the Terrible		Christopher Guest			Neil Kaplan
Napoleon Bonaparte		Alain Chabat			Brian George
Al Capone		Jon Bernthal			André Sogliuzzo
George Armstrong Custer		Bill Hader			Chad Einbinder
The Thinker		Hank Azaria^{V}			Ted Biaselli; Hank Azaria
Abraham Lincoln Statue		Hank Azaria^{V}			Ted Biaselli; Hank Azaria
Cherub Cupid Statues		Jonas Brothers^{V}			Jonas Brothers
Able the Space Monkey		Crystal the Monkey			Dee Bradley Baker
Albert Einstein Bobbleheads		Eugene Levy^{V}			Eugene Levy
Laaa			Ben Stiller	Zachary Levi	
Merenkahre			Ben Kingsley	Jonathan Roumie	
Single-film characters
Rebecca Hutman	Carla Gugino				
Don	Paul Rudd				
Christopher Columbus Statue	Pierfrancesco Favino				
Meriwether Lewis	Martin Christopher				
William Clark	Martin Sims				
Sailor Joey Motorola		Jay Baruchel			
Brundon the Security Guard		Jonah Hill			
Docent		Mindy Kaling			
Oscar the Grouch		Caroll Spinney			
Darth Vader		Thomas Morley			
Lancelot			Dan Stevens		
Tilly			Rebel Wilson		
Shepseheret			Anjali Jay		
Madeline Phelps			Rachael Harris		
Garuda Artefact			Robin Williams^{V}		
Hugh Jackman / King Arthur			Himself^{C}^{U}		
Alice Eve / Guinevere			Herself^{C}^{U}		
Joan of Arc				Alice Isaaz	
George Washington				Chris Parnell	
Seth				Akmal Saleh	
Ronnie				Bowen Yang	
Mia				Shelby Simmons	
Bodhi				Tenzing Norgay Trainor	
Neanderthal					Chad Einbinder
Sheila Burns					Molly Hagan
Billy the Kid					Ted Biaselli
Cleopatra					Julie Nathanson
Ben Franklin					André Sogliuzzo

== Additional crew and production details ==
Film	Director	Producer(s)	Writer(s)	Composer	Cinematographer	Editor(s)	Production companies	Distributor
Night at the Museum	Shawn Levy	Shawn Levy; Chris Columbus; Michael Barnathan	Thomas Lennon; Robert Ben Garant	Alan Silvestri	Guillermo Navarro	Don Zimmerman	1492 Pictures; 20th Century Fox; 21 Laps Entertainment	20th Century Fox
Night at the Museum: Battle of the Smithsonian	Shawn Levy	Shawn Levy; Chris Columbus; Michael Barnathan	Thomas Lennon; Robert Ben Garant	Alan Silvestri	John Schwartzman	Don Zimmerman; Dean Zimmerman	1492 Pictures; 20th Century Fox; 21 Laps Entertainment; Dune Entertainment	20th Century Fox
Night at the Museum: Secret of the Tomb	Shawn Levy	Shawn Levy; Chris Columbus; Michael Barnathan	David Guion; Michael Handelman	Alan Silvestri	Guillermo Navarro	Dean Zimmerman	1492 Pictures; 20th Century Fox; 21 Laps Entertainment	20th Century Fox
Night at the Museum: Kahmunrah Rises Again	Matt Danner	Shawn Levy	Ray DeLaurentis; William Schifrin	John Paesano	—N/a	Luc Perrault	Walt Disney Pictures; Atomic Cartoons; Alibaba Pictures; 21 Laps Entertainment	Disney+

== Reception ==
=== Box office ===
Title	Year	Box office gross			Budget	Ref.
Title	Year	North America	Elsewhere	Worldwide	Budget	
Night at the Museum	2006	$250,863,268	$323,617,961	$574,481,229	$110 million	
Night at the Museum: Battle of the Smithsonian	2009	$177,243,721	$235,862,449	$413,106,170	$150 million	
Night at the Museum: Secret of the Tomb	2014	$113,746,621	$249,458,014	$363,204,635	$127 million	
Total		$541,853,610	$808,938,424	$1,350,792,034	$387 million	

=== Critical and public response ===
The franchise has received mixed reviews from critics.

Film	Rotten Tomatoes	Metacritic	CinemaScore
Night at the Museum	43% (136 reviews)	48 (28 reviews)	A-
Night at the Museum: Battle of the Smithsonian	45% (167 reviews)	42 (31 reviews)	B+
Night at the Museum: Secret of the Tomb	47% (112 reviews)	47 (33 reviews)	B+
Night at the Museum: Kahmunrah Rises Again	71% (14 reviews)	TBA	TBA

== Video game ==
In April and May 2009, Night at the Museum: Battle of the Smithsonian – The Video Game, an action-adventure video game adaptation of the feature film of the same name, developed by Amaze Entertainment and Pipeworks Software, was published by Majesco to BlackBerry, Wii, Microsoft Windows, Nintendo DS, and Xbox 360. Ben Stiller reprises his role in the film as the voice of Larry Daley.

== Stage ==
In April 2020, Alan Menken revealed that he is working as lyricist and composer for a stage musical adaptation of Night at the Museum. On September 11, 2020, Night at the Museum director Shawn Levy revealed that he is also working on the musical, which has been in development for "a year and a half" by that point. Work on the musical had to be done remotely through Zoom due to COVID.

== Theme park ==
A Night at the Museum: Midnight Mayhem ride is at Genting SkyWorlds.

== See also ==
- List of films featuring dinosaurs
- List of films featuring miniature people
