= Night at the Museum: Kahmunrah Rises Again =

2022 animated film by Matt Danner

- Official release poster
- Directed by: Matt Danner
- Screenplay by: Ray DeLaurentis; Will Schifrin
- Based on: Characters by; Thomas Lennon; Robert Ben Garant; The Night at the Museum by Milan Trenc
- Produced by: Shawn Levy
- Starring: Joshua Bassett; Jamie Demetriou; Alice Isaaz; Gillian Jacobs; Joseph Kamal; Thomas Lennon; Zachary Levi; Alexander Salamat; Kieran Sequoia; Jack Whitehall; Bowen Yang; Steve Zahn
- Edited by: Luc Perrault
- Music by: John Paesano
- Production companies: Walt Disney Pictures (Note: Originally produced by 20th Century Studios, the film was released under the Walt Disney Pictures banner, although the copyright is registered with 20th Century Studios.); 21 Laps Entertainment; Atomic Cartoons; Alibaba Pictures
- Distributed by: Disney+ (Worldwide); Alibaba Pictures (China)
- Release date: December 9, 2022
- Running time: 77 minutes
- Countries: United States; Canada; China
- Language: English

Night at the Museum: Kahmunrah Rises Again (also known as Night at the Museum 4: Kahmunrah Rises Again) is a 2022 animated fantasy comedy film directed by Matt Danner, written by the team of Ray DeLaurentis & Will Schifrin, and starring Joshua Bassett, Jamie Demetriou, Alice Isaaz, Gillian Jacobs, Joseph Kamal, Thomas Lennon, Zachary Levi, Alexander Salamat, Kieran Sequoia, Jack Whitehall, Bowen Yang, and Steve Zahn. The fully animated spin-off to Night at the Museum: Secret of the Tomb (2014), it is the first animated film in the Night at the Museum film series and the fourth installment overall, as well as the first animated feature film produced by Atomic Cartoons. The film follows Nick Daley, the son of Larry Daley, as he becomes a night guard at the Museum of Natural History. In addition to Nick Daley, it also features Kahmunrah, the main antagonist of Night at the Museum: Battle of the Smithsonian (2009).

Unlike the live-action films, 1492 Pictures is not involved with the film. Night at the Museum: Kahmunrah Rises Again was released on December 9, 2022, on Disney+, to generally positive reviews from critics.

== Plot ==
The exhibitions of the American Museum of Natural History scare away the latest guard, much to a passing Larry Daley's displeasure. Teddy Roosevelt and Sacagawea tell him that they would prefer that his son, Nick, take over the position; after some reluctance, Larry agrees.

Nick is struggling, as he wants to join the school's jazz recital by being their DJ so that he can be close to his crush Mia. Despite his teacher Ms. Montefusco seeing promise in him, Nick believes he has failed. Larry explains to Nick that while he will be guarding the History Museum in Japan for the summer, Nick will be filling in for him at home. Nick thinks he will fail, but Larry manages to get his ex-wife Erica to also agree to it.

Nick is reunited with the museum exhibits, including Rexy, Attila, Jedediah, Octavius, Laaa, Dexter the monkey, and new exhibit Joan of Arc. His first task is to lock the basement storage room, but after encountering all the creepy things downstairs, uses a statue to block the door and runs away in fear. Kahmunrah, who was locked away, breaks free and steals the tablet that brings the exhibitions to life in an effort to rule the world. A chase ensues through the museum, but he manages to escape. Nick and his friends take off after him while Rexy stays behind to guard the museum. While outside, Joan has a vision showing her that Kahmunrah is headed to the Museum of Natural Art, where an exhibition on the Temple of Dendur is being held.

The group catch up to Kahmunrah and chase him through the art museum. Kahmunrah brings the God of Chaos Seth to life, who uses his powers to keep Nick and the others at bay. The two find a painting that leads to ancient Egypt and enter it. With only a few hours until sunrise, Nick and his friends enter the painting as well. While traversing the Nile, Nick blames himself for Kahmunrah's escape and feels hopeless, but the group encourages him. They eventually arrive at Dendur and avoid a series of traps before reaching Kahmunrah and Seth, who use the tablet to play a melody that unleashes an army of jackals on them.

A fight in the temple ensues, with Nick finally overcoming his insecurities. He plays the notes in reverse, which causes the tablet to suck away the jackals, Seth, and Kahmunrah. Nick and his friends escape, and jump through a poster to return to the natural history museum just before sunrise. Nick uses his newfound self-confidence to successfully audition for the jazz recital, starts dating Mia, and accepts his position as the museum's new night guard.

== Voice cast ==
=== Humans ===
- Joshua Bassett as Nick Daley, the son of Larry Daley, and the newest security guard at the American Museum of Natural History. He was portrayed by Jake Cherry and Skyler Gisondo in the previous films.
- Jamie Demetriou as Dr. McPhee, the director of the Museum of Natural History and Larry's former boss. He was portrayed by Ricky Gervais in the previous films.
- Gillian Jacobs as Erica Daley, Larry's former wife and Nick's mother. She was portrayed by Kim Raver in the first film.
- Zachary Levi as Larry Daley, Nick's father, Erica's former husband, and the previous security guard of the museum who gets a job at the National History Museum of Japan. He was portrayed by Ben Stiller in the previous films.
- Shelby Simmons as Mia, Nick's love interest.
- Tenzing Norgay Trainor as Bodhi, a student at Nick's school.
- Lidia Porto as Ms. Montefusco, Nick’s music teacher
- Bowen Yang as Ronnie, a night guard at the museum who quits after only a few minutes because of the exhibits.

=== Exhibits ===
- Thomas Lennon as Theodore Roosevelt, the wax sculpture of the 26th President of the United States. He was portrayed by Robin Williams in the previous films. Lennon co-wrote the first two films and portrayed Orville Wright in the second film.
- Zachary Levi as Laaa, a Neanderthal who was made to resemble Larry. He was portrayed by Ben Stiller in the third film.
- Alice Isaaz as Joan of Arc, the statue of the woman, who led the French in war against the English, and sees visions of the future.
- Jack Whitehall as Octavius, a Roman soldier diorama miniature and Jedediah's best friend. He was portrayed by Steve Coogan in the previous films.
- Steve Zahn as Jedediah, a cowboy diorama miniature and Octavius' best friend. He was portrayed by Owen Wilson in the last three films.
- Joseph Kamal as Kahmunrah, a pharaoh who is Ahkmenrah's older brother and seeks revenge against Larry. He was portrayed by Hank Azaria in the second film.
- Alexander Salamat as Attila the Hun, the statue of the leader of the Huns. He was portrayed by Patrick Gallagher in the previous films.
- Kieran Sequoia as Sacagawea, the polyurethane model of the Lemhi Shoshone woman who is Theodore Roosevelt's girlfriend. She was portrayed by Mizuo Peck in the previous films.
- Akmal Saleh as Seth, the Egyptian God of Chaos who helps Kahmunrah with his quest, to conquer the world.
- Chris Parnell as George Washington, the 1st President of the United States. He appears in the famous painting "Washington Crossing the Delaware".
- Dee Bradley Baker as Dexter, a Capuchin monkey. He was portrayed by Crystal the Monkey in the previous films.
- Kelemete Misipeka as Moai, an Easter Island Head at the Museum of Natural History. He was voiced by Brad Garrett in the previous films.
- Jonathan Roumie as Merenkahre, the mummy of an ancient pharaoh and Kahmunrah's father who appears on different carvings seen throughout the film. He was portrayed by Ben Kingsley in the third film.
- Zeeko Zaki as Ra, the Egyptian Sun God whose head appears on the temple in an Ancient Egypt painting.
- Jim Conroy as Alexander Hamilton

== Production ==
=== Development ===
In 2016, it was reported that a remake of Night at the Museum was in development from Alibaba Pictures Group. By August 2018, then-CEO of 20th Century Fox Stacey Snider announced that a television series based on Night at the Museum was in development instead. In August 2019, after the acquisition of 21st Century Fox by Disney, the project was confirmed to be still in development as a Disney+ exclusive film.

In October 2020, it was reported that an animated film titled Night at the Museum: Kahmunrah Rises Again was in development. The plot centers around Larry's son, Nick, who is hesitant to follow in his father's footsteps as nightwatchman. In addition to Nick and Kahmunrah, the film also features other returning characters: Jedediah, Octavius, Theodore "Teddy" Roosevelt and Sacagawea, with the addition of Joan of Arc. In August 2021, Shawn Levy said that the film would debut on Disney+ in 2022. In September 2022, Matt Danner revealed he was directing the film; he previously was the creator and showrunner of the Disney animated show Legend of the Three Caballeros (2018). Several crew members from Legend of the Three Caballeros worked on the film, with Danner describing it as a "spiritual successor" to the series. In November 2022, the release date of December 9, 2022 was revealed.

=== Animation ===
The animation was handled by Atomic Cartoons, using the same style they used from their previous work, Little Demon, enhancing lighting and character rigging. The film has a 2D animation style, making it the first 2D animated film released under Walt Disney Pictures since Winnie the Pooh.

=== Music ===
In March 2022, John Paesano revealed that he was composing the film. By August 29, 2022, Paesano was confirmed as composer, replacing Alan Silvestri from the first three films.

== Release ==
The film was exclusively released on Disney+ on December 9, 2022 after being delayed from a 2021 release. This film was released under the Walt Disney Pictures banner instead of 20th Century Studios.

== Reception ==
On the review aggregator site Rotten Tomatoes, the film holds a 77% based on reviews from 13 critics, with an average rating of 6/10. John Serba wrote in a Decider review that the film's "rapid-fire comedy keeps pace with the near-omnipresent hyperkinetic action, which would wear us to nubs if this movie was a second longer than its 77 minutes. Bottom line, it ain't half bad, which is about all we can ask for from the Museum franchise at this point."

== Future ==
Thomas Lennon hinted that another film could be developed and expressed interest in doing another live-action film with Ben Stiller. He added that the animated film "opens up a lot of new possibilities".
