= Chris Columbus (filmmaker) =

American filmmaker (born 1958)

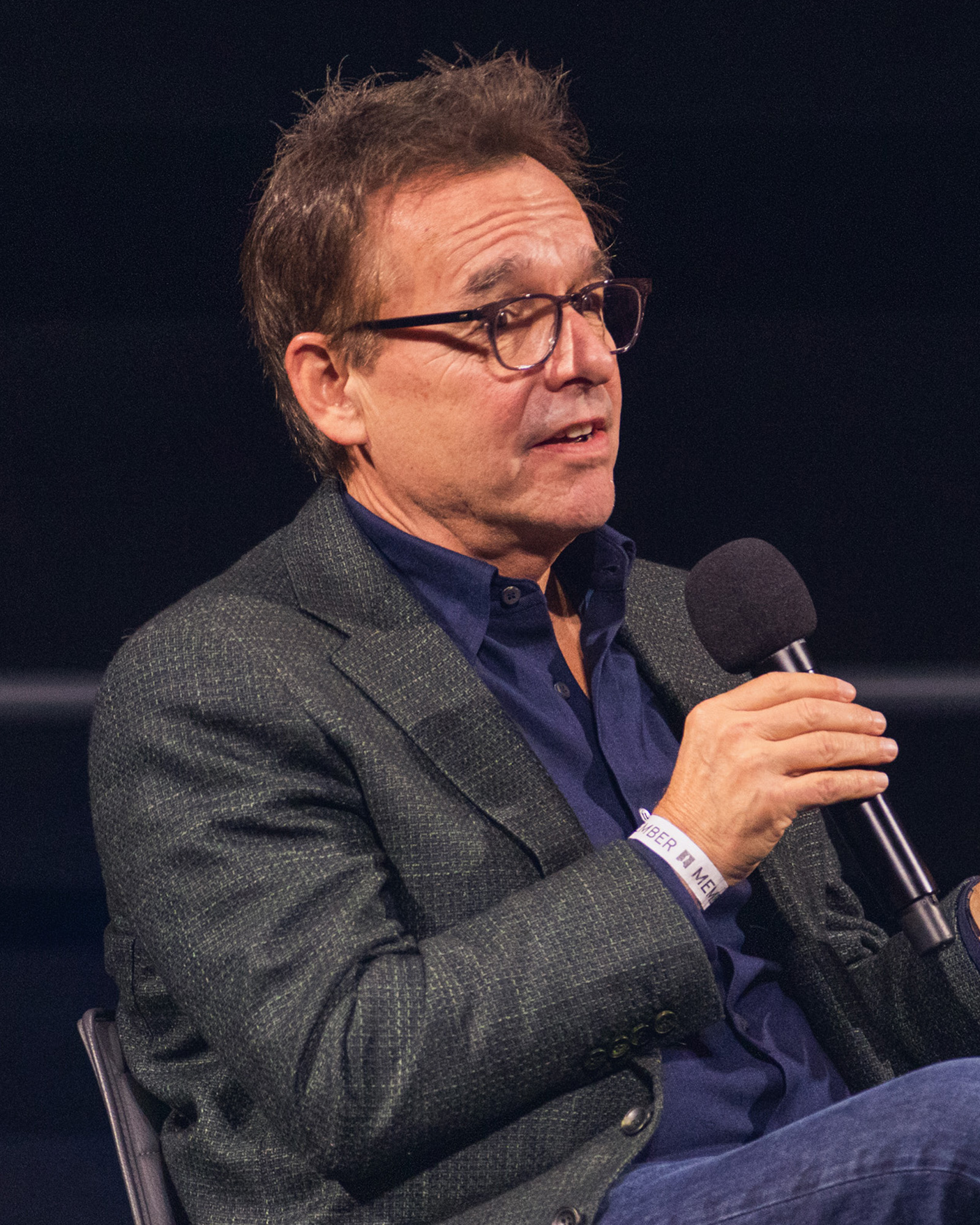
- Columbus in 2025
- Born: Christopher Joseph Columbus; September 10, 1958 (age 68); Spangler, Pennsylvania, U.S.
- Education: New York University (BA)
- Occupations: Director; producer; screenwriter
- Years active: 1984–present
- Spouse: Monica Devereux (m. 1983)
- Children: 4

Christopher Joseph Columbus (born September 10, 1958) is an American filmmaker. Born in Spangler, Pennsylvania, Columbus studied film at New York University's Tisch School of the Arts where he developed an interest in filmmaking. After writing screenplays for several teen comedies in the mid-1980s, including Gremlins, The Goonies, and Young Sherlock Holmes, he made his directorial debut with a teen adventure, Adventures in Babysitting (1987). Columbus gained recognition soon after with the highly successful Christmas comedy Home Alone (1990) and its sequel, Home Alone 2: Lost in New York (1992).

The comedy Mrs. Doubtfire (1993), starring Robin Williams, was another box office success for Columbus. He went on to direct several other films throughout the 1990s, which were mostly met with lukewarm reception. However, he found commercial success again for directing the film adaptations of J. K. Rowling's novels, Harry Potter and the Sorcerer's Stone (2001) and its sequel, Harry Potter and the Chamber of Secrets (2002). Columbus was a producer of Harry Potter and the Prisoner of Azkaban (2004) and the drama The Help (2011), for which he was nominated for the Academy Award for Best Picture. He also directed the fantasy Percy Jackson & the Olympians: The Lightning Thief (2010) and the 3D action comedy Pixels (2015). Columbus will next direct, co-write and produce the long-awaited Gremlins 3 which is scheduled for release on October 6, 2028.

Columbus is the co-founder of 1492 Pictures, a film production company that has produced some of his films since 1995. More recently, he co-founded another production firm with his daughter in 2014, called Maiden Voyage Pictures. Columbus is also known for his collaboration with composer John Williams, with whom he has worked both on the first two Home Alone films and the first two Harry Potter films.

== Early life, family and education ==
Columbus was born in Spangler, Pennsylvania, the only child of Irene Mary (née Puskar), a factory inspector for General Motors, and Alexander Michael Columbus, an aluminum plant worker and coal miner. He is of Italian and Slovak descent. His mother's grandfather, Jozef Puškár, was born in Tarna, Ung County, Austria-Hungary (today Trnava pri Laborci, Slovakia) and embarked on NDL's SS Friedrich der Große in Bremen on May 25, 1901, arriving at Ellis Island on June 5, 1901. Her other grandfather, Jozef Burík, was from Vinna-Banka (today Vinné). As a youth, growing up in Champion, Ohio, Columbus enjoyed drawing storyboards and Marvel Comics, and began making 8 mm films in high school.

Columbus attended New York University's film school at the Tisch School of the Arts, where he was a classmate of screenwriter Charlie Kaufman and Alec Baldwin. Although he received a scholarship, he forgot to renew it and was forced to take a factory job to pay for schooling. While on shifts, he secretly worked on a 20-page screenplay, which one of his teachers would later use to help him get an agent. Columbus stated that the experience "saved [his] life" and he was able to acknowledge "the terrifying reality I faced of having to live and work in that factory for the rest of my life in that town if I didn't make it". Columbus graduated from NYU in 1980.

In 1980, while a senior at NYU, Columbus directed a short film, I Think I'm Gonna Like It Here, that was later noticed by Steven Spielberg. I Think I'm Gonna Like It Here was preserved by the Academy Film Archive in 2014.

== Career ==
=== 1984–1990: Early success ===
Columbus' career began in the early 1980s as a writer for the screenplay of the feature film Reckless (1984). Columbus later admitted, "it wasn't my best work. I intended it to be semi-biographical ... and the film was based on my attempts to break free. But the director turned it into a clumsy teen sex drama and the experience was so degrading." Dissatisfied, Columbus conceived a new screenplay while living in an apartment loft, a comedy-horror titled Gremlins (1984). In late 1981, he eventually received a phone call from Steven Spielberg, who expressed an interest in buying the script. Upon release, the film was a critical success. Columbus then moved to Los Angeles to work for Spielberg's Amblin Entertainment, writing more scripts including The Goonies and Young Sherlock Holmes (both 1985).

After staying in Los Angeles for two years, he said, "There's an unreality to the place, a lack of connection with real people." He decided to move back to New York City. He wrote episodes for the animated series Galaxy High (1986) and received screenwriting credit for Little Nemo: Adventures in Slumberland (1989). Columbus then started his directing career with the teen comedy Adventures in Babysitting (1987). The film received mixed reviews from critics and was regarded as a "mediocre debut". Next, he wrote and directed Heartbreak Hotel (1988) which is a story about Elvis Presley being abducted and finding himself offering counsel and help to a small-town family. The film was a commercial failure at the box office and it also received mixed-to-negative reviews.

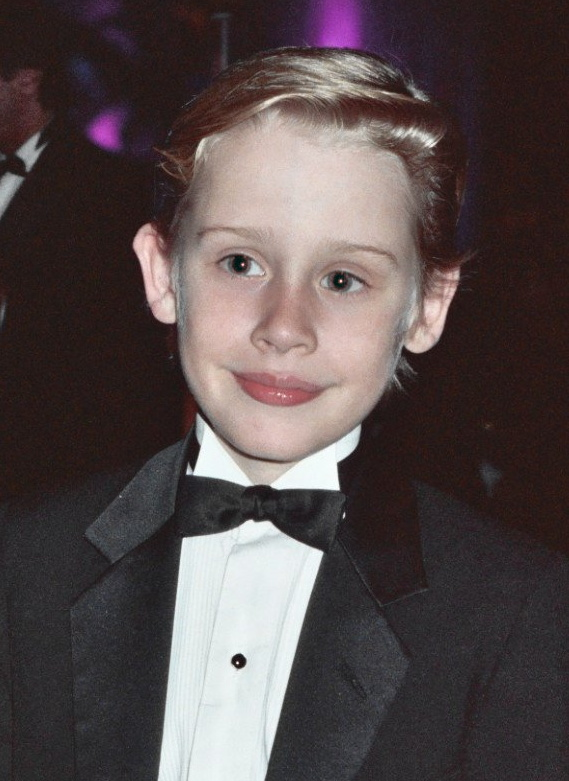
Home Alone made Culkin (pictured here in 1991) a child star.

In the late 1980s, fellow filmmaker John Hughes approached Columbus to direct Home Alone (1990), a comedy film written by Hughes. Columbus had left National Lampoon's Christmas Vacation before shooting started, because of a personality clash with actor Chevy Chase, who Columbus said treated him "like dirt". Columbus particularly enjoyed the Christmas theme of the Home Alone script and quickly accepted the offer. Subsequently, Columbus hired Macaulay Culkin, Joe Pesci, Daniel Stern, John Heard, and Catherine O'Hara as the principal cast. Filming took four months between February and May 1990 and the film was released to theaters on November 16, 1990, to commercial success. Home Alone grossed $285 million in North America and $190 million elsewhere for a worldwide $476.7 million, against a budget of $18 million. Nominated for two Academy Awards and two Golden Globe Awards, the film served as Culkin's breakthrough role. Dave Kehr of Chicago Tribune praised Hughes for writing recognizable characters, and Columbus for direction with "wit and warmth". Home Alone has since been regarded as a "classic" to watch during the holiday season.

=== 1991–2000: Comedies and romances ===
In 1991, Columbus wrote and directed the romantic comedy-drama Only the Lonely (1991), with John Hughes serving as co-producer. Starring John Candy, Maureen O'Hara, Ally Sheedy, and Anthony Quinn, the film depicts a Chicago policeman who must balance his loyalty between his mother and a shy funeral home employee, a loose adaptation of Marty. The film managed to garner some favourable reviews despite performing tepidly at the box office. In 1992, Columbus returned to direct the sequel to the first film, titled Home Alone 2: Lost in New York. Featuring the same principal cast of its predecessor, the plot takes place one year after the events of the first film. The film follows Kevin McCallister as he accidentally boards the wrong flight to New York City and finds himself confronted by the two same burglars in the first film. Home Alone 2: Lost in New York was released on November 20, 1992, to mixed reviews, but strong box office results, grossing $359 million worldwide. Janet Maslin for The New York Times wrote that "Home Alone 2 may be lazily conceived, but it is staged with a sense of occasion and a lot of holiday cheer. The return of Mr. Culkin in this role is irresistible, even if this utterly natural comic actor has been given little new to do. Mr. Pesci and Mr. Stern bring great gusto to their characters' stupidity".

Columbus' next directorial feature was Mrs. Doubtfire (1993), an adaptation of Anne Fine's novel Alias Madame Doubtfire about an unemployed father who disguises himself as a nanny so he can spend time with his children. Starring Robin Williams, Sally Field and Pierce Brosnan, Williams was given creative freedom to improvise his lines, provoking amusement to all of the cast and crew. The film was released by 20th Century Fox in November 1993 to mixed and positive reception. Film review aggregator Rotten Tomatoes gave the film an approval rating of 72%, praising Williams. Roger Ebert calls Williams "a mercurial talent who loves to dart in and out of many different characters and voices", but thought Mrs. Doubtfire "has the values and depth of a sitcom". However, the film performed well at the box office, earning $441.3 million worldwide. The film also won the Academy Award for Best Makeup, Golden Globe Award for Best Actor and Golden Globe Award for Best Picture.

In 1995, Columbus co-founded his own production company, 1492 Pictures, named after the year that Christopher Columbus reached the Americas, as a pun on his own name. He then wrote and directed another film, a remake of the French film Neuf mois titled Nine Months (1995), which was produced by 1492 Pictures. A romantic comedy, Nine Months starred Hugh Grant, Julianne Moore, Tom Arnold, Joan Cusack, Jeff Goldblum, and Robin Williams. The story centers on a man who finds out that his longtime girlfriend is pregnant and has to change his lifestyle. Although the film was criticized for being "mismanaged", it was a commercial success, grossing $138.5 million at the box office. He then produced Jingle All the Way (1996), a Christmas comedy starring Arnold Schwarzenegger. Columbus followed up on this effort with Stepmom (1998), a comedy-drama starring Julia Roberts, Susan Sarandon, and Ed Harris. Writing for the Los Angeles Times, Kenneth Turan praises Roberts and Harris' performances despite the script having a "tiny handful of honest moments". With an estimated budget of $50 million, the film grossed a healthy $159.7 million worldwide. Sarandon also earned a Golden Globe nomination for Best Actress in a Motion Picture Drama.

Columbus collaborated again with Robin Williams for his next project, 1999's Bicentennial Man. Based on the novel The Positronic Man, by Isaac Asimov and Robert Silverberg, the film tells the story of a robot who becomes human-like and acquires emotions. The supporting cast included Sam Neill, Embeth Davidtz, Wendy Crewson, and Oliver Platt. The film was released on December 17, 1999, and was a commercial failure, grossing $87.4 million from a budget of $100 million. Critical response to the film were mixed, with Ben Falk of the BBC describing it as "the worst kind of movie – one with no direction, no identity, and above all no heart". Peter Stack of San Francisco Chronicle opined of the film, "It's a bit strange, and strained. More syrupy melodrama than comedy [...] doesn't have much of the usual Williams manic antics", but compliments the computer-generated imagery. Bicentennial Man was nominated for the Academy Award for Best Makeup at the 72nd Academy Awards.

=== 2001–2010: Harry Potter and other film series ===
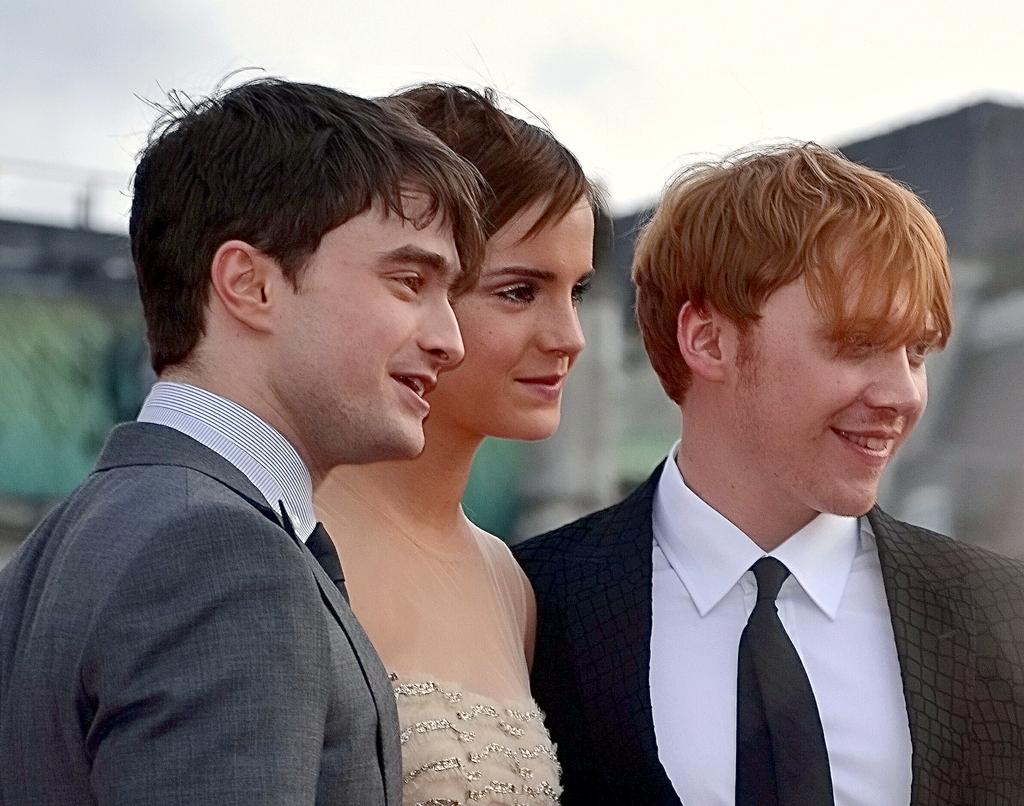
Cast of the Harry Potter film series: Daniel Radcliffe, Emma Watson and Rupert Grint, 2011

After his daughter's request to read J. K. Rowling's 1997 fantasy novel Harry Potter and the Philosopher's Stone, Columbus expressed a strong desire to direct the film adaptation. In 2000, he convinced Warner Bros. to select him as director for it. The film is the first installment of the Harry Potter film series and was written by Steve Kloves and produced by David Heyman. The story follows Harry Potter's first year at Hogwarts School of Witchcraft and Wizardry and his self-discovery as a famous wizard. Columbus relocated to the United Kingdom with his family to focus on directing. Columbus said the casting process was "very intense", but Daniel Radcliffe, Rupert Grint, and Emma Watson were eventually picked for the lead roles. Filming began on September 29, 2000, and lasted for 180 days. The film premiered at the Odeon Leicester Square in London on November 4, 2001, to critical and commercial success, grossing $975.1 million worldwide. The film was praised for its sets, costumes, casting, musical score, cinematography and special effects. In addition, it was nominated for three Academy Awards for Best Original Score, Best Art Direction and Best Costume Design.

In 2002, Columbus returned to direct the second installment, Harry Potter and the Chamber of Secrets (2002), based on Rowling's second novel. Featuring much of the same cast from the first film, the story follows Harry Potter's second year at the school when a chamber is opened unleashing a monster. Producer David Heyman said, "Fortunately, we benefited from the experience of the first film ... [the cast] have maintained their enthusiasm, sense of wonder". Columbus also opted to use more handheld cameras for freedom of movement. The film was released to theaters on November 15, 2002. Harry Potter and the Chamber of Secrets shared similar critical acclaim to the first film, and grossed $879 million worldwide. A. O. Scott of The New York Times observed that the film was long but praised it for the special effects and "thrilling" sequences. At the 2003 BAFTA Awards, the film garnered nominations for Best Production Design, Best Sound, and Best Special Visual Effects.

In 2004, Columbus wrote and produced Christmas with the Kranks, a Christmas comedy based on the 2001 novel Skipping Christmas by John Grisham; the film was a box office success but received mostly negative reviews. In the same year, Columbus returned for the third installment of the Harry Potter series, Harry Potter and the Prisoner of Azkaban. Physically exhausted from the first two films, he decided not to direct but serve as producer alongside Heyman and director Alfonso Cuarón. The film premiered on May 31, 2004, in the United Kingdom to strong critical praise and earned $796.9 million worldwide. After returning to the United States in 2005, Columbus intended to produce a superhero film, Fantastic Four, but due to disagreements with director Tim Story, he was fired. Next, he directed 2005's Rent, a musical drama adapted from the 1996 Broadway musical of the same name. The film, starring six of the original Broadway cast members, depicts the lives of several Bohemians and their struggles living in East Village of New York City from 1989 to 1990. The film had mixed reviews and a poor box office performance.

In 2006, Columbus served as a producer for Night at the Museum, a fantasy film based on the 1993 children's book of the same name by illustrator Milan Trenc, and is the first installment in the Night at the Museum series. The film stars Ben Stiller as Larry Daley, a father who applies for a job at the American Museum of Natural History and subsequently discovers that the exhibits come to life at night. Next, he served as an executive producer for Fantastic Four: Rise of the Silver Surfer (2007), a sequel to the first film which was also a commercial success. In 2009, he produced Night at the Museum: Battle of the Smithsonian, the second installment of the series. Despite mixed reviews, the film was a box office success, earning $413.1 million worldwide. That same year, he directed I Love You, Beth Cooper, a comedy starring Hayden Panettiere and Paul Rust, based on a novel by Larry Doyle. The film was released in July 2009 to negative reviews; Peter Travers of Rolling Stone wrote that Columbus "flattens every joke and sucks the life out of the actors", adding it is "super bad".

Despite this setback, Columbus was hired by 20th Century Fox to direct Percy Jackson & the Olympians: The Lightning Thief (2010), which he also produced. The film is the first installment in the Percy Jackson series and is based on fantasy Greek mythology: the 2005 novel The Lightning Thief by Rick Riordan. Starring an ensemble led by Logan Lerman, the film received mixed reviews (and was panned by fans of the original series) but found box office success upon its release in February. The film grossed $226.4 million worldwide. Kenneth Turan of the Los Angeles Times described it as "unadventurous and uninteresting" and criticized screenwriter Craig Titley for changing the original story. The Toronto Star's Linda Barnard praised Columbus' ability to "woo a young audience" but thought the film lacked Harry Potter charm.

=== 2011–present: Focus as a producer and Pixels ===
As early as 2009, Variety magazine reported that Columbus, Michael Barnathan, and Mark Radcliffe were working on a film adaptation of Kathryn Stockett's novel The Help. Released in 2011, the film of the same name was directed by Tate Taylor with Columbus serving as producer. The film and novel recount the story of a young white aspiring journalist, Eugenia "Skeeter" Phelan, and her relationship with two black maids, Aibileen Clark and Minny Jackson, during the Civil Rights Movement. The film received critical and commercial success, earning $216.6 million worldwide. Roger Ebert described it as "involving and wonderfully acted", and Amy Biancolli of the San Francisco Chronicle called it "a film that makes us root for the good guys, hiss at the bad and convulse in laughter when good wreaks vengeance with a smile". At the 84th Academy Awards, Octavia Spencer won the Academy Award for Best Supporting Actress for her role. The film also received three other nominations: Best Picture, Best Actress and Best Supporting Actress for Jessica Chastain. The film won the Screen Actors Guild Award for Outstanding Performance by a Cast in a Motion Picture.

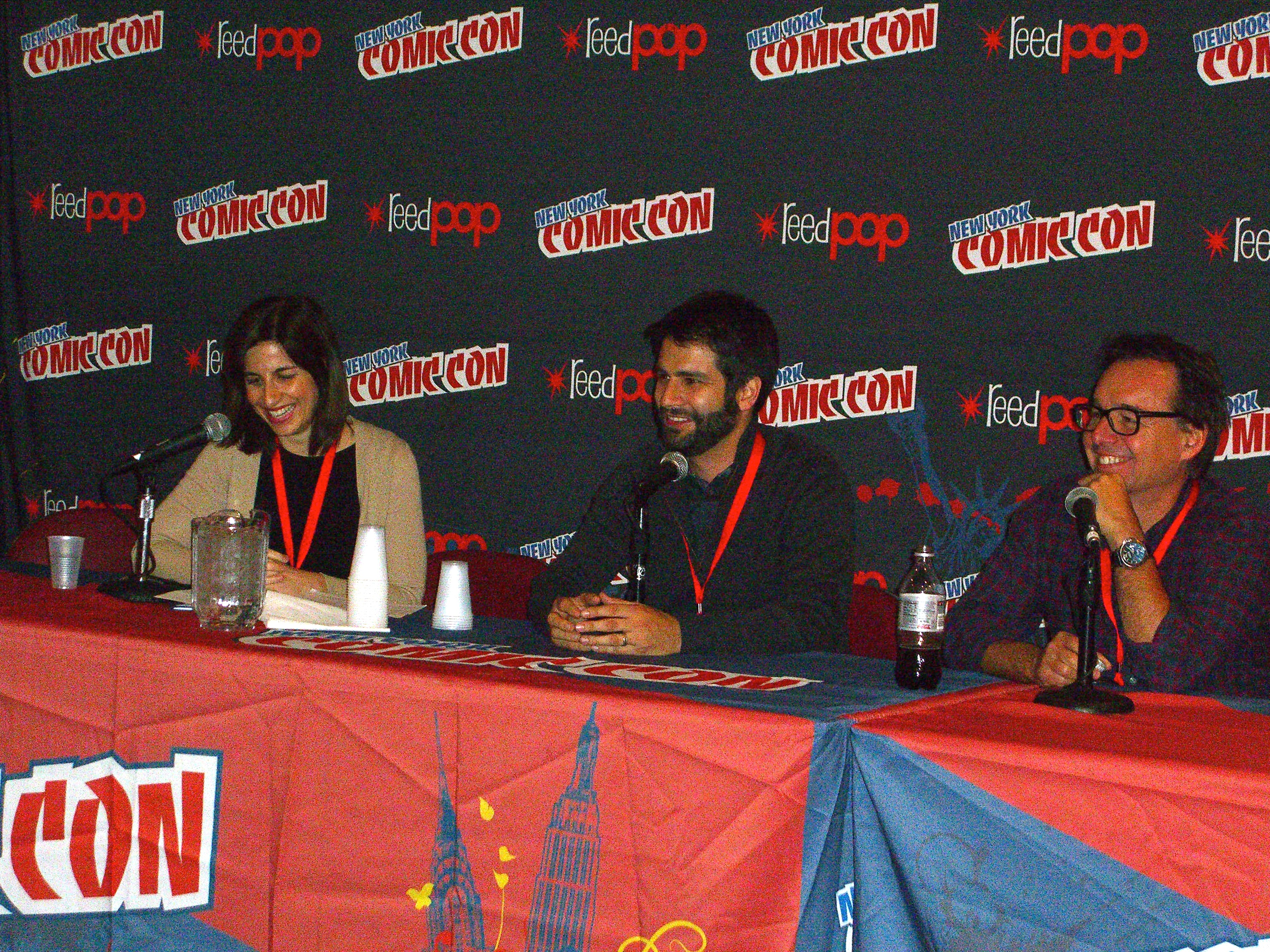
Ned Vizzini and Columbus at the New York Comic Con, 2012

In 2013, Columbus co-authored the House of Secrets book series with Ned Vizzini. Shortly, Columbus returned to the Percy Jackson series, as an executive producer for the sequel titled Percy Jackson: Sea of Monsters. Directed by Thor Freudenthal, and starring much of the cast from the previous installment, the film grossed $200.9 million worldwide. However, it received a divided critical reaction. Columbus next produced Night at the Museum: Secret of the Tomb, the final installment in the Night at the Museum series. Released in December 2014, the film was a financial success, grossing $363.2 million at the box office. It was also Robin Williams' final film appearance before his death.

In 2014, Columbus cofounded production company Maiden Voyage Pictures with his daughter, Eleanor. He also co-founded an animation studio called ZAG Animation Studios with Saban Capital Group and ZAG Entertainment.

Columbus directed the science fiction comedy Pixels (2015). He first learned about the project from Adam Sandler; Of that encounter, he said, "He gave me the Pixels script after we hit it off. My daughter read it and said, 'You have to read this movie. It's completely fun and unexpected'". The film is based on Patrick Jean's 2010 short film of the same name, which depicts aliens who attack the Earth in the form of arcade video games. Principal photography took three months in Toronto, after which computer-generated imagery and visual effects were then applied. Starring Sandler, Kevin James, Michelle Monaghan, Peter Dinklage, Josh Gad and Brian Cox, Pixels was met with mixed reviews but earned $244.9 million at the box office. Marjorie Baumgarten of The Austin Chronicle said the film is "flat-footed and grows tedious after the first hour" but praised the 3D effects which "enhances the action". Peter Travers of Rolling Stone gave the film one star out of four, calling it "a 3D metaphor for Hollywood's digital assault on our eyes and brains [...] relentless and exhausting".

Also in 2015, Columbus served as a producer for three films: supernatural horror The Witch, Italian drama Mediterranea, and a comedy titled It Had to Be You. During 2016, Columbus produced small-scale and independent features. First, The Young Messiah, a fictional story of a seven-year-old Jesus who tries to discover the truth about his life when he returns to Nazareth from Egypt. Second, Tallulah, a comedy drama starring Elliot Page, Allison Janney, and Tammy Blanchard; the film is about a young woman who takes a baby from its negligent mother and pretends the child is her own. Tallulah premiered at the Sundance Film Festival on January 23, 2016, and was released on Netflix on July 29, 2016. In 2017, Columbus served as an executive producer for Menashe, and a producer for Patti Cake$ and I Kill Giants. Columbus also produced The Christmas Chronicles (2018), a family film directed by Clay Kaytis.

In 2018, Columbus was announced as director of a Five Nights at Freddy's film adaptation, but he backed out of the project by September 2021. In 2019, Columbus joined the producers of The Lighthouse, a film directed by Robert Eggers and starring Willem Dafoe and Robert Pattinson as two lighthouse keepers who lose their sanity. In 2018 it was announced that Columbus would serve as an executive producer for Scoob!, an animated adventure film featuring characters from the Scooby-Doo franchise; it was released on May 15, 2020. He has also directed The Christmas Chronicles 2 (2020), a sequel to the film he had co-produced.

On April 18, 2024, it was announced Columbus would direct a film adaptation of the Richard Osman novel The Thursday Murder Club for Amblin Partners. The movie - with a cast including Helen Mirren, Pierce Brosnan, Ben Kingsley and Celia Imrie - was co-produced by Steven Spielberg and received positive reviews from critics.

==== Upcoming projects ====
Columbus has been attached as a director to a Hello Ghost remake, announced in 2011. In 2017, Columbus said he had written a script for Gremlins 3.

In January 2025, it was reported by Deadline that Columbus was writing sequels to Gremlins and The Goonies for Warner Bros., which were later confirmed by the studio and also will have Steven Spielberg involved as a producer. In November 2025, it was confirmed that Columbus would be co-writing the script along with Zach Lipovsky and Adam Stein and that Columbus would also direct and produce Gremlins 3 replacing director Joe Dante who directed the first two films. Gremlins 3 is currently scheduled for release on October 6, 2028.

== Filmmaking style ==
Columbus's films are often grounded in stories about unconventional and dysfunctional families, and explore characters who lose their loved ones. He is regarded as a "sentimental" filmmaker due to his exploration of contemporary domesticity. "One of the themes I've always been fascinated by is a character facing the potential of losing their family and what that means," Columbus said in 2017. Columbus is also known for creating "emotionally vivid scenes", and admits that he is drawn to extreme emotions.

Burhan Wazir of The Guardian states that Columbus prefers characters that are the "everyday American men, women, and children who struggle to uphold family traditions against a changing, sometimes intimidating society". In 1993, Columbus said: "I can understand the validity of showing people the ugliness of the world, but I also think there is a place for movies to leave people with a sense of hope. If your film isn't going to do that, I just don't think it's worth making." Culture website The Take opined that Columbus excels in creating heartwarming family films with untrained child actors, but found box office success without an "incredibly distinct cinematic style" to his work.

Columbus has served as a mentor to Robert Eggers since The Witch.

== Personal life ==
Columbus resides in San Francisco. Columbus endorsed Democratic candidate Hillary Clinton in the 2016 United States presidential election. He is also a partner at Ocean Blue Entertainment, a creative content company focused on film production.

== Filmography ==
Year	Title	Director	Writer	Producer	Ref.
1984	Reckless	No	Yes	No	
1984	Gremlins	No	Yes	No	
1985	The Goonies	No	Yes	No	
1985	Young Sherlock Holmes	No	Yes	No	
1987	Adventures in Babysitting	Yes	No	No	
1988	Heartbreak Hotel	Yes	Yes	No	
1989	Little Nemo: Adventures in Slumberland	No	Yes	No	
1990	Home Alone	Yes	No	No	
1991	Only the Lonely	Yes	Yes	No	
1992	Home Alone 2: Lost in New York	Yes	No	No	
1993	Mrs. Doubtfire	Yes	No	No	
1995	Nine Months	Yes	Yes	Yes	
1998	Stepmom	Yes	No	Yes	
1999	Bicentennial Man	Yes	No	Yes	
2001	Harry Potter and the Sorcerer's Stone	Yes	No	Executive	
2002	Harry Potter and the Chamber of Secrets	Yes	No	Executive	
2004	Christmas with the Kranks	No	Yes	Yes	
2005	Rent	Yes	No	Yes	
2009	I Love You, Beth Cooper	Yes	No	Yes	
2010	Percy Jackson & the Olympians: The Lightning Thief	Yes	No	Yes	
2015	Pixels	Yes	No	Yes	
2020	The Christmas Chronicles 2	Yes	Yes	Yes	
2025	The Thursday Murder Club	Yes	No	Yes	

Producer only

- Jingle All the Way (1996)
- Harry Potter and the Prisoner of Azkaban (2004)
- Night at the Museum (2006)
- Night at the Museum: Battle of the Smithsonian (2009)
- The Help (2011)
- Night at the Museum: Secret of the Tomb (2014)
- Mediterranea (2015)
- Tallulah (2016)
- The Young Messiah (2016)
- Patti Cake$ (2017)
- I Kill Giants (2017)
- The Christmas Chronicles (2018)
- Chupa (2023)
- Nosferatu (2024)

Executive producer only

- Monkeybone (2001)
- Fantastic Four (2005)
- Fantastic Four: Rise of the Silver Surfer (2007)
- Percy Jackson: Sea of Monsters (2013)
- Little Accidents (2014)
- The Witch (2015)
- It Had to Be You (2015)
- Menashe (2017)
- Yes, God, Yes (2019)
- The Lighthouse (2019)
- Scoob! (2020)
- Night at the Museum: Kahmunrah Rises Again (2022)
- Dìdi (2024)
- The President's Cake (2025)
- Werwulf (2026)

== Critical reception ==
Below are the average ratings of Columbus's films provided by two review aggregator websites:

Year	Film	Rotten Tomatoes	Metacritic
1987	Adventures in Babysitting	73%	N/A
1988	Heartbreak Hotel	38%	N/A
1990	Home Alone	67%	63%
1991	Only the Lonely	64%	N/A
1992	Home Alone 2: Lost in New York	34%	N/A
1993	Mrs. Doubtfire	71%	53%
1995	Nine Months	23%	N/A
1998	Stepmom	46%	58%
1999	Bicentennial Man	36%	42%
2001	Harry Potter and the Sorcerer's Stone	81%	64%
2002	Harry Potter and the Chamber of Secrets	82%	63%
2005	Rent	46%	53%
2009	I Love You, Beth Cooper	13%	32%
2010	Percy Jackson & the Olympians: The Lightning Thief	49%	47%
2015	Pixels	17%	27%
2020	The Christmas Chronicles 2	67%	51%
2025	The Thursday Murder Club	76%	61%

== See also ==
- Chris Columbus's unrealized projects

Preceded by None	Harry Potter film director 2001–2002	Succeeded by Alfonso Cuarón
