= Night at the Museum =

2006 film directed by Shawn Levy

- Theatrical release poster
- Directed by: Shawn Levy
- Written by: Robert Ben Garant; Thomas Lennon
- Based on: The Night at the Museum by Milan Trenc
- Produced by: Shawn Levy; Chris Columbus; Michael Barnathan
- Starring: Ben Stiller; Carla Gugino; Dick Van Dyke; Mickey Rooney; Bill Cobbs; Robin Williams
- Cinematography: Guillermo Navarro
- Edited by: Don Zimmerman
- Music by: Alan Silvestri
- Production companies: 20th Century Fox; 1492 Pictures; 21 Laps Entertainment
- Distributed by: 20th Century Fox
- Release dates: December 17, 2006 (New York City); December 22, 2006 (United States)
- Running time: 108 minutes
- Countries: United Kingdom; United States
- Language: English
- Budget: $110 million
- Box office: $574.5 million

Night at the Museum is a 2006 fantasy comedy film directed by Shawn Levy and written by Robert Ben Garant and Thomas Lennon. It is based on the 1993 children's book by Milan Trenc. The film stars Ben Stiller in the lead role, alongside Carla Gugino, Dick Van Dyke, Mickey Rooney, Bill Cobbs, and Robin Williams.

The film follows Larry Daley, a divorced father who applies for a job as a night watchman at New York City's American Museum of Natural History and subsequently discovers that the exhibits come to life at night by a magical Egyptian artifact, and must find a way to keep them under control.

Night at the Museum premiered in New York City on December 17, 2006, and was released in the United States on December 22 by 20th Century Fox. The film received mixed reviews from critics and grossed $574.5 million, becoming the fifth highest-grossing film of 2006. Two live-action sequels were released: Night at the Museum: Battle of the Smithsonian in 2009, and Night at the Museum: Secret of the Tomb in 2014. An animated spin-off, titled Night at the Museum: Kahmunrah Rises Again, was released in 2022 on Disney+.

== Plot ==
Aspiring New York City inventor Larry Daley bounces between jobs and apartments. Although sympathetic, his ex-wife Erica believes he is a bad example to their ten-year-old Nick, who considers quitting ice hockey and plans to work in the finance sector like Erica's fiancé Don. Larry fears Nick admires Don over him, especially as Don gets invited to his school's Career Day.

Larry interviews at the Museum of Natural History with the almost retired night security guard Cecil Fredericks. As the museum is hemorraging money, Cecil and his colleagues Reginald and Gus are being replaced with one guard, so Larry gets hired despite his resume. Cecil gives him a manual, warning him that he will "not let anything in... or out."

On his first night, Larry falls asleep. Upon waking up, he discovers the T-rex skeleton is missing. After finding the T-rex alive and being chased by him, he calls Cecil, who suggests using the manual. Larry tames him by throwing a bone, then names him "Rexy".

After sunset, all exhibits come alive, including: Dexter, a mischievous stuffed capuchin monkey who destroys Cecil’s instructions and takes Larry's keys; rival miniature civilizations depicting the American Frontier, Ancient Rome, and Ancient Maya; a chewing gum-loving Easter Island Moai who calls Larry "Dum-Dum"; American Civil War soldier mannequins; and wax models of Attila the Hun and his men, pyromaniacal Neanderthals, and Sacagawea. A horse-mounted Theodore Roosevelt rescues Larry from feuding miniature leaders Jedediah and Octavius. He explains that ever since the 1952 arrival of Egyptian Pharaoh Ahkmenrah’s Golden Tablet, the exhibits come alive each night. If any exhibits are outside at sunrise, they disintegrate. As they restore order, Larry sees Theodore loves Sacagawea but is too shy to tell her.

The retirees check on Larry, who almost quits, but Nick and Don's congratulatory visit convinces him to stay. Cecil suggests he read up on history. Larry controls the exhibits better, but must extinguish a fire the Neanderthals start. Meanwhile, Dexter steals his keys again, unlocking a window, so a Neanderthal escapes onto the street, seeing a group of indigents with a fire pit, and disintegrates in the sun.

Nick witnesses museum director Dr. McPhee firing Larry over the damaged Neanderthal exhibit. Eventually, Larry is given another chance to prove himself and clears up the misunderstanding with Nick. Rebecca Hutman, a museum guide and historian writing her dissertation on Sacagawea, believes Larry is mocking her when he reveals the museum's nighttime secret.

Larry wants Nick to see the T-Rex come alive, but nothing happens. The tablet has been deactivated by the retirees who want to steal it with other valuables to fund their retirement and frame Larry. They want the tablet for its vitality restoring powers.

Having regained and reactivated the tablet, Larry and Nick are chased through the museum, until Cecil snatches it, locking them in the Egyptian room. Larry releases Ahkmenrah's mummy from his sarcophagus. The pharaoh reveals himself as a fully living human, and helps them escape. Larry convinces the squabbling exhibits to help catch the guards and recover the tablet.

Gus and Reginald are captured, while Cecil escapes via Pony Express stagecoach. Theodore pushes Sacagawea out of Cecil's path and is sliced in half but survives, being "made of wax." Larry pursues Cecil into Central Park, regaining the tablet. Theodore bonds with Sacagawea as she repairs him. Rebecca sees the exhibits returning to the museum and realizes Larry was being truthful; he later introduces her to Sacagawea. Theodore and Nick are proud of Larry's work. Larry laments he could not save everyone, believing that Jedediah and Octavius were both killed, so is surprised upon their return.

The next day, McPhee attempts to fire Larry after news reports about the night's strange events, such as the Neanderthals leaving cave paintings in the museum's subway station and Rexy's dinosaur tracks in Central Park, but the publicity boosts museum attendance. Larry is rehired, goes to Nick's next school career day, and celebrates that night with a party, with Nick, Rebecca and the exhibits. During the credits, it is revealed that the former guards, rather than being turned in to the police by Larry, must work as museum janitors as punishment for their actions, so they clean up after the party.

== Cast ==
- Ben Stiller as Larry Daley, a night-shift security guard at the American Museum of Natural History in New York, Nick's father, and Erica's former husband.
- Carla Gugino as Rebecca Hutman, a museum docent.
- Dick Van Dyke as Cecil Fredericks, a veteran security guard.
- Bill Cobbs as Reginald, a veteran security guard.
- Mickey Rooney as Gus, a veteran security guard, who takes an instant dislike to Larry.
- Robin Williams as Theodore Roosevelt, the wax sculpture of the 26th President of the United States dressed in his Rough Rider uniform, who befriends and mentors Larry.
- Ricky Gervais as Dr. Leslie McPhee, the curator of the Museum of Natural History and Larry's boss.
- Jake Cherry as Nick Daley, Larry's and Erica's son.
- Steve Coogan as Octavius, a miniature Roman general figure.
- Owen Wilson as Jedediah (uncredited), a miniature cowboy figure.
- Rami Malek as the mummy of Ahkmenrah, a benevolent Egyptian pharaoh and the tablet's original owner, who becomes a fully living human at night. The film marks Malek's film debut.
- Patrick Gallagher as a wax model of Attila the Hun, who antagonizes Larry at first before Larry appeals to his softer side.
- Mizuo Peck as Sacagawea, the polyurethane model of the Lemhi Shoshone woman who guided Merriwether Lewis and William Clark, and later Theodore Roosevelt's girlfriend.
- Pierfrancesco Favino as a bronze statue of Christopher Columbus, whose name Larry consistently forgets due to no label.
- Kim Raver as Erica Daley, Larry's former wife and Nick's mother.
- Paul Rudd as Don, Erica's fiancé.
- Kerry van der Griend, Dan Rizzuto, Matthew Harrison, and Jody Racicot as wax models of Neanderthals.
- Brad Garrett as the voice of the Easter Island Head.
- Crystal the Monkey as Dexter, a stuffed Capuchin monkey who repeatedly torments Larry.
- Martin Christopher as a wax model of Meriwether Lewis.
- Martin Sims as a wax model of William Clark.
- Randy Lee, Darryl Quon, Gerald Wong, and Paul Chih-Ping Cheng as wax models of Huns.
- Charlie Murphy as the taxi-driver.
- Anne Meara as Debbie.
- Roger Lewis and Dave Hospes as miniature cowboys.
- Jonathan Lee as a miniature Chinese railroad worker.
- Jason Mckinnon as a miniature Irish railroad worker.
- Jason Vaisvila, Cade Wagar, and Gary Sievers as wax models of Vikings.
- Cory Martin as a Chinese terracotta soldier.
- Trevor Addie as a miniature Roman.
- Lloyd Adams as a soldier.
- Matthew Walker as a politician.

== Production ==
Before Shawn Levy was hired, Stephen Sommers was originally set to direct the film, but he dropped out due to creative differences and to focus on a proposed remake of When Worlds Collide. The building featured in the film, which was constructed on a soundstage in Burnaby, British Columbia, is based on the American Museum of Natural History in New York City, external shots of which were used in the film. Filming took place from January through July 2006. Trainers spent several weeks training Crystal, who plays the troublemaking monkey Dexter, to slap and bite Ben Stiller in the film.

Shawn Levy credited Stiller for assembling the ensemble cast: "When actors hear that Ben Stiller is in a movie they want to work with him. It['s] a high-water mark and it absolutely draws actors in and I'm convinced that's a big part of why we got this cast."

== Music ==
Alan Silvestri replaced John Ottman as score composer. Silvestri's score was used for the teaser trailer of Horton Hears a Who!.

Varèse Sarabande released a soundtrack album of the score on December 19, 2006.

== Release ==
Night at the Museum had its premiere in New York City on December 17, 2006. It was later released on December 22, 2006, in the United States, December 26, 2006, in the United Kingdom, January 12, 2007, in Brazil, on February 14, 2007, in China and on March 17, 2007, in Japan.

== Reception ==
=== Box office ===
At the end of its box office run, Night at the Museum earned a gross of $250.9 million in the United States and Canada and $323.6 million in other territories, for a worldwide total of $574.5 million. It was the fifth highest-grossing film of 2006 and also the highest-grossing film worldwide of the trilogy. It was also the highest-grossing film directed by Shawn Levy, until it was surpassed by Deadpool & Wolverine.

It was the highest-grossing film in its opening weekend, grossing $30.8 million and playing in 3,685 theaters, with an $8,258 per-theater average. For the four-day Christmas holiday weekend, it took in $42.2 million. The movie was also released in IMAX large screen formats, often on-site at museums of science or natural history such as the Pacific Science Center in Seattle.

In its second weekend, Night at the Museum expanded into 83 more theaters for a total of 3,768, and took in approximately $36.7 million, out-grossing its opening weekend. It maintained the top position in its third week, with an additional $23.7 million. Night at the Museum is the second highest-grossing film of 2006 in the United States and Canada, behind Pirates of the Caribbean: Dead Man's Chest.

During its international opening weekend of December 22, 2006, the film grossed a figure of an estimated $5 million, with the highest debut coming from South Korea ($5.04 million). The biggest market in the other territories were the United Kingdom, Japan, South Korea, and Germany, where it grossed $40.8 million, $30 million, $25.7 million, $22.9 million.

=== Critical response ===
On the review aggregator Rotten Tomatoes, Night at the Museum has an approval rating of 42% based on 139 reviews and an average rating of 5.5/10. The site's critical consensus read, "Parents might call this either a spectacle-filled adventure or a shallow and vapid CG-fest, depending on whether they choose to embrace this on the same level as their kids." As of October 2020, on Metacritic, the film had a score of 48 out of 100 based on 28 critics, indicating "mixed or average reviews". According to CinemaScore polls conducted during the opening weekend, cinema audiences gave the film an average grade of "A−" on an A+ to F scale.

Justin Chang of Variety magazine wrote: "This rambunctious, "Jumanji"-style extravaganza is a gallery of special effects in search of a story; rarely has so much production value yielded so little in terms of audience engagement." James Berardinelli of Reelviews gave it 2 stars out of 4, and commented on Stiller's performance by stating "It might be fair to give Ben Stiller an 'A' for effort, but to call what he does in this movie 'acting' is a misnomer. He does a lot of running around, occasionally falling down or bumping into things." One positive review by William Arnold of the Seattle Post-Intelligencer, gave it a B−, and stated that the film was "Out to impress and delight a family audience with the pageantry of human and natural history, and that's a surprisingly worthy ambition for a Hollywood comedy."

Museum officials at the American Museum of Natural History have credited the film for increasing the number of visitors during the holiday season by almost 20%. According to a museum official, between December 22, 2006, and January 7, 2007, there were 50,000 more visitors than during the same period the prior year.

=== Home media ===
Night at the Museum was released on a 2-Disc DVD edition in the United Kingdom on April 23, 2007, by 20th Century Fox Home Entertainment. The film was released in 1-Disc and 2-Disc DVD editions and in a Blu-ray Disc format on April 24, 2007, elsewhere.

As of December 6, 2009, the film has sold 9,191,694 DVDs and grossed $153,566,058 in DVD sales.

== Accolades ==
Award	Category	Nominee	Result	Ref.
Saturn Awards	Best Fantasy Film	—N/a	Nominated	
ASCAP Award	Top Box Office Films	Alan Silvestri	Won	
Artios	Best Feature Film Casting - Comedy	Ilene Starger; Coreen Mayrs (Vancouver casting); Heike Brandstatter (Vancouver casting)	Won	
Kids' Choice Awards	Favorite Movie	—N/a	Nominated	
MTV Movie Award	Best Comedic Performance	Ben Stiller	Nominated	
National Movie Award	Best Comedy	—N/a	Nominated	
Teen Choice Award	Choice Movie: Comedy and Choice Movie Actor: Comedy	Ben Stiller	Nominated	
Taurus Award	Hardest Hit	Greg Fitzpatrick	Nominated	
Young Artist Award	Best Performance in a Feature Film - Young Actor Age Ten or Younger	Jake Cherry	Nominated	

== Sequels ==
Night at the Museum was followed by a sequel titled Night at the Museum: Battle of the Smithsonian, which was released on May 22, 2009, in North America. A third film, Night at the Museum: Secret of the Tomb, was released on December 19, 2014, in North America.

In 2016, The Hollywood Reporter stated that the Alibaba Pictures Group intended to remake the film. On August 6, 2019, following the purchase of 21st Century Fox and its assets by The Walt Disney Company, Disney CEO Bob Iger announced that a fully animated spin-off to Night at the Museum was in development. The project was released as Night at the Museum: Kahmunrah Rises Again on Disney+ starting on December 9, 2022, as a co-production between Walt Disney Studios Motion Pictures and 20th Century Studios.

== Reboot ==
A reboot of Night at the Museum is currently in development with 20th Century Fox (now renamed to 20th Century Studios). It is understood that this reboot will feature new characters and a new story, and will not be a continuation of the earlier films.

== See also ==
- List of films featuring dinosaurs
