= Night at the Museum: Secret of the Tomb =

2014 film directed by Shawn Levy

- Theatrical release poster
- Directed by: Shawn Levy
- Screenplay by: David Guion; Michael Handelman
- Story by: Mark Friedman; David Guion; Michael Handelman
- Based on: Characters by Thomas Lennon; Robert Ben Garant
- Produced by: Shawn Levy; Chris Columbus; Mark Radcliffe
- Starring: Ben Stiller; Robin Williams; Owen Wilson; Dan Stevens; Ben Kingsley
- Cinematography: Guillermo Navarro
- Edited by: Dean Zimmerman
- Music by: Alan Silvestri
- Production companies: 21 Laps Entertainment; 1492 Pictures
- Distributed by: 20th Century Fox
- Release dates: December 11, 2014 (Ziegfeld Theatre); December 19, 2014 (United States)
- Running time: 97 minutes
- Country: United States
- Language: English
- Budget: $127 million
- Box office: $363.2 million

Night at the Museum: Secret of the Tomb is a 2014 American fantasy comedy film directed by Shawn Levy and written by David Guion and Michael Handelman. It is the third (and final live-action) installment in the Night at the Museum film series, a sequel to Night at the Museum: Battle of the Smithsonian (2009), and the final installment of the original trilogy. The film stars Ben Stiller in the lead role, Robin Williams, Owen Wilson, Dan Stevens and Ben Kingsley.

The film follows security guard Larry Daley as he travels to London to restore the Tablet of Ahkmenrah, which causes the exhibits to come to life, before the magic disappears.

Principal photography of Secret of the Tomb took place from January to May 2014 in London, England and British Columbia, Canada. The film premiered on December 11, 2014, at New York City's Ziegfeld Theatre and was released in the United States on December 19, 2014, by 20th Century Fox. Secret of the Tomb grossed over $363 million at the box office, becoming the lowest-grossing film in the series, and like its predecessors, received mixed reviews.

== Plot ==
In 1938, archaeologists are searching for the tomb of pharaoh Ahkmenrah in Egypt. The Tablet of Ahkmenrah is found. As the tombs artifacts are being packed, the locals warn against removing the tablet from the tomb, saying "the end will come."

Seventy-six years later in New York City, five years after the events of the second film, Larry Daley is still the Museum of Natural History night guard. He and the exhibits are hosting an event to help re-open the Hayden Planetarium. The exhibits inform Larry that the museum commissioned a new Neanderthal model that resembles him. The new Neanderthal calls himself Laaa and considers Larry his father. Later, Ahkmenrah shows Larry that the tablet has a mysterious corrosion. As the corrosion spreads, the exhibits act abnormally and cause massive chaos at the planetarium. After calming the situation, a frustrated Larry returns home where teenage son Nick, is throwing a party. After, they discuss Nick's future.

To discover what is happening to the tablet, Larry seeks out former museum guard Cecil Fredericks, now living in a retirement community following his release from prison. Cecil, whose father was the archaeologist who found the tablet, remembers, "the end will come" prophecy and realizes the tablet's magic is ending and the exhibits are becoming lifeless. Cecil says Ahkmenrah's parents, Merenkahre and Shepseheret, who are in the British Museum, may be able to restore the tablet's power. Larry convinces museum curator Dr. McPhee, who was fired after the planetarium incident, to allow him to ship Ahkmenrah to London to restore the tablet, though McPhee believes the magic is just clever special effects. Larry, Ahkmenrah, and Nick travel to the U.K. and go to the British Museum, bypassing night guard Tilly. Larry discovers that some of the American exhibits have stowed away with Ahkmenrah: Theodore Roosevelt, miniatures Jedediah and Octavius, Sacagawea, Attila the Hun, Dexter the capuchin monkey, and Laaa, who want to help. As they search the museum, the tablet brings the British exhibits to life.

The group is joined by a wax figure of Sir Lancelot. As the tablet's corrosion worsens, the American exhibits begin experiencing stiffening limbs and memory reversion. Ahkmenrah's parents are located and they explain the tablet's power can be regenerated by moonlight through the magic of Khonsu. Lancelot steals the tablet, believing it is the Holy Grail, and prepares to leave for Camelot. Tilly locks Larry and Laaa in the employee break room, but they escape.

Lancelot crashes the musical Camelot and is stunned to learn that Camelot, King Arthur, and the Knights of the Round Table are myths. The corrosion has almost consumed the entire tablet and is rendering the exhibits into lifeless forms. The group tells Lancelot that although Camelot never existed, he can have a life. Lancelot returns the tablet and Larry straightens the pieces as the moonlight restores the tablet's power and revives the exhibits. As the American exhibits prepare to return home, they decide that Ahkmenrah and the tablet should stay at the British Museum with his parents, despite knowing they will no longer come alive. Larry is upset, but they are at peace with their unanimous decision. Ahkmenrah thanks Larry for reuniting him with his family, and the exhibits head home. Back in New York, Larry spends some final moments with his friends before the sun rises, then departs the museum for the final time.

Three years later, Larry is now a schoolteacher. Tilly brings a traveling exhibit to New York in a collaboration with the museum. In McPhee's office, Tilly gives him the tablet, showing him its power and allowing the exhibits to awaken again. From across the street, Larry, smiling, quietly watches as the exhibits celebrate their revival.

== Cast ==
- Ben Stiller as Larry Daley, a security guard at the American Museum of Natural History.
  - Stiller as Laaa, a Neanderthal who was made to resemble Larry.
- Rami Malek as Ahkmenrah, the mummy of an ancient pharaoh.
- Dan Stevens as Sir Lancelot, the wax statue of the legendary Knight of the Round Table.
- Robin Williams as Theodore Roosevelt, the wax sculpture of the 26th President of the United States who is Larry's mentor.
  - Williams also voices Garuda.
- Owen Wilson as Jedediah, a cowboy diorama miniature and Octavius' best friend.
- Steve Coogan as Octavius, a Roman soldier miniature and Jedediah's best friend.
- Rebel Wilson as Tilly, the night security guard at the British Museum.
- Skyler Gisondo as Nick Daley, the son of Larry Daley who is now a teenager.
- Ben Kingsley as Merenkahre, the mummy of an ancient pharaoh and Ahkmenrah's father.
- Ricky Gervais as Dr. Leslie McPhee, the director of the Museum of Natural History and Larry's boss.
- Mizuo Peck as Sacagawea, the polyurethane model of the Lemhi Shoshone woman who is Theodore Roosevelt's girlfriend.
- Patrick Gallagher as Attila the Hun, the statue of the leader of the Huns.
- Crystal the Monkey as Dexter, a stuffed Capuchin monkey.
- Anjali Jay as Shepseheret, the mummy of a Great Royal Wife of Merenkahre and Ahkmenrah's mother.
- Brad Garrett (voice) as Moai, an Easter Island Head at the Museum of Natural History.
- Randy Lee, Darryl Quon, Gerald Wong, Paul Chih-Ping Cheng as wax models of Huns.
- Kerry van der Griend, Matthew Harrison, and Jody Racicot as wax models of Neanderthals.
- Matty Finochio as Roman Sentry.
- Rachael Harris as Madeline Phelps, the chairwoman of the American Museum of Natural History.
- Dick Van Dyke as Cecil Fredericks Jr., a retired security guard from the first film.
  - Percy Hynes White plays the younger Cecil "C.J" Fredericks Jr. in the prologue.
- Mickey Rooney as Gus, a retired security guard from the first film.
- Bill Cobbs as Reginald, a retired security guard from the first film.
- Andrea Martin as Rose, an archivist at the Museum of Natural History.
- Brennan Elliott as Robert Fredericks, C.J.'s father in the prologue.
- Matt Frewer as Archibald Stanley, an archaeologist who accompanies Robert and Cecil in the prologue
- Hugh Jackman (uncredited) as himself
- Alice Eve (uncredited) as herself

== Production ==
On January 21, 2010, co-writer Thomas Lennon said to Access Hollywood, "I think it's a really outstanding idea to do Night at the Museum 3, in fact. I wonder if someone's not even already working on a script for that. I cannot confirm that for a fact, but I cannot deny it for a fact either... It might be in the works." In an October 2011 interview with The Hollywood Reporter, Stiller confirmed the sequel; however, he said that it was only in the "ideas stage". In February 2013 it was announced that the film, directed by Shawn Levy, would be released on December 25, 2014. On September 10, 2013, it was announced that shooting would start in February 2014.

On November 8, 2013, actor Dan Stevens was cast as Lancelot. On November 15, 2013, it was announced that Skyler Gisondo would be replacing Jake Cherry in the role of Nicky Daley. On December 18, 2013, it was announced that Stiller, Robin Williams, and Ricky Gervais would be returning for the sequel. On January 9, 2014, it was announced that Rebel Wilson would play a security guard in the British Museum. On January 14, 2014, the film's release date was moved up from December 25, 2014, to December 19, 2014. On January 23, 2014, it was announced that Ben Kingsley would play an Egyptian Pharaoh at the British Museum. Principal photography and production began on January 27, 2014. On May 6, 2014, it was announced that the film would be titled Night at the Museum: Secret of the Tomb. In May 2014, principal photography ended. Shooting took place outside the British Museum in London, England, as well as on a sound stage at the Vancouver Film Studios in Vancouver, British Columbia for scenes taking place inside the museum. This film marks the final performances of Robin Williams and Mickey Rooney and is dedicated to their memories.

== Music ==
Alan Silvestri returned to score the final installment of the trilogy.

Varèse Sarabande released a soundtrack album of the film's score on January 6, 2015.

== Release ==
The film premiered at the Ziegfeld Theatre in New York City on December 11, 2014. The film was released alongside Annie on December 19, 2014, in the United States, by 20th Century Fox.

== Reception ==
=== Box office ===
Night at the Museum: Secret of the Tomb grossed $113.7 million in North America, and $249.5 million in other territories, for a worldwide total of $363.2 million against a budget of $127 million.

In North America, early analysts were predicting a potential $25–$28 million opening. In North America, the film was released on December 19, 2014, across 3,785 theaters. It earned $5.6 million on its opening day, placing at number three at the box office. The film underperformed expectations during its opening weekend, earning $17.1 million, which was relatively lower than the openings of the original film ($30.4 million) and its sequel ($54.1 million). The film debuted at number two at the box office behind The Hobbit: The Battle of the Five Armies. According to 20th Century Fox, the movie's audience was 51% male, with 54% of the audience under the age of 25. Audiences polled by CinemaScore during the opening weekend, gave the film an average grade of "B+", on an A+ to F scale.

The film began its international rollout the same weekend as the North American premiere and earned $10.4 million from 27 markets in its opening weekend, debuting at #3 at the box office behind The Hobbit: The Battle of the Five Armies and Penguins of Madagascar. The film expanded to an additional 40 markets in its second week and grossed $31.2 million. It topped the box office outside North America in its fourth weekend with a total gross of $46.2 million, primarily because of China, where it opened at #1 with $26 million. The other highest opening figures were from Mexico ($5.85 million), Brazil ($3.1 million), Malaysia ($3.07 million), the UK ($3 million), Australia ($2.8 million), Germany ($2.1 million) and Singapore ($2 million).

For the weekend of January 16, 2015, the film grossed $17.8 million, which includes a $3.9 million debut in South Korea.

=== Critical response ===
On Rotten Tomatoes, the film received a 48% approval rating, based on 115 reviews, with an average score of 4.9/10. The site's critical consensus reads, "While not without its moments, Night at the Museum: Secret of the Tomb is a less-than-inspired sendoff for the trilogy." On Metacritic, the film has a score of 47 out of 100, based on 33 critics, indicating "mixed or average reviews".

Scott Foundas of Variety gave the film a positive review, praising the visual effects and calling the production values "topnotch", and admiring Guillermo Navarro's work. He added, "A most enjoyable capper to director Shawn Levy and producer Chris Columbus' cheerfully silly and sneakily smart family-entertainment juggernaut... offers little in the way of secrets of surprises, but should add much holiday cheer to Fox's box-office coffers." Peter Bradshaw of The Guardian gave the film three stars out of five and said, "The third part in what absolutely no one is calling the Night at the Museum 'trilogy' turns out to be a good-natured and entertainingly surreal panto fantasy." Glenn Kenny of RogerEbert.com awarded the film 2 stars out of 4 criticizing the performances of the cast and said, "As talent-packed as any Night at the Museum picture may be—in this third installment... —one doesn't come to a movie of this sort expecting anybody's best work. Or at least one certainly shouldn't, because it won't materialize." Stephanie Zacharek of The Village Voice gave the film a positive review, saying "The third installment, Night at the Museum: Secret of the Tomb may be the best, and even the generally wound-too-tight Ben Stiller – once again playing a bemused Museum of Natural History guard – is easy to tolerate." Claudia Puig of USA Today gave the film two and a half stars out of four, saying "Where the previous films felt frenetic and forced, this outing feels breezier, more enjoyable and less contrived." Joe Neumaier of the New York Daily News gave the film three out of five stars, saying "There's a serenity to museum visits, especially if it's a place you know and love. Night at the Museum: Secret of the Tomb, amazingly, recaptures that feeling in big-studio franchise form."

Bill Goodykoontz of The Arizona Republic gave the film two out of five stars, saying "Night at the Museum: Secret of the Tomb is a rather lackluster affair, a cash grab that tries to aim a little higher but confuses sappy shortcuts with real emotion." Joe McGovern of Entertainment Weekly gave the film a B, saying "It's kind of fun, unembarrassingly, and not least of all because the people who made it look like they had a good time doing so." Tom Long of The Detroit News gave the film a B, saying "There are some key elements that make this Night at the Museum sequel work better than its predecessor." Stephen Whitty of the Newark Star-Ledger gave the film two out of four stars, saying "The exhibits in this Night at the Museum may still come to life nightly. But their latest movie stays stubbornly inert." Tom Russo of The Boston Globe gave the film two and a half stars out of four, saying "Seeing Ben Stiller, the late Robin Williams, and their magically roused gang together again, this time in London, is initially all about indulgent, nostalgic smiles rather than new wows. But then comes the movie's exceptionally clever and fresh final act, which delivers genuine surprise along with many laughs." Robbie Collin of The Daily Telegraph gave the film three out of five stars, saying "The third Night at the Museum film starts strongly, with its heart in the past... It's an exciting opening, and perhaps too exciting for the film's own good. It's hard not to be disappointed when the plot moves back to the present and settles into the time-honoured formula of digitised creatures running riot and famous people in fancy dress doing shtick." Michael Rechtshaffen of The Hollywood Reporter gave the film a negative review, saying "Despite relocating across the pond to the esteemed British Museum, the creaky Night at the Museum: Secret of the Tomb fails to capitalize on the comic potential provided by that change of venue."

Ignatiy Vishnevetsky of The A.V. Club gave the film a C+, saying "Secret of the Tomb plays [a particular scene] as a source of corny jokes, pop-culture references, and father-son bonding moments. In other words, it's exactly the kind of film that shouldn't be expected to engage with its assorted bizarre subtexts – but what a movie it could be if it did." Sara Stewart of the New York Post gave the film two out of four stars, saying "For piquing kids' interest in history and nature, you could do worse than this goofy Ben Stiller franchise. But its third installment is more meh than manic, too reliant on wide shots of the ragtag Museum of Natural History cohorts striding down corridors. You get the feeling returning director Shawn Levy is ready to hang it up." Richard Roeper of the Chicago Sun-Times gave the film one and a half stars out of five, saying "The dialogue is schmaltzy and often painfully unfunny. The special effects are often so 1980s-bad, one wonders if it was a deliberate choice, to make the creepy visuals of sculptures dancing and paintings moving less frightening to young viewers. Time and again, terrific actors sink in the equivalent of cinematic quicksand, helpless against the sucking sound of this movie." Drew Hunt of Slant Magazine gave the film one out of four stars, saying "None of the entries in the Night at the Museum series could ever pass for high art, but a wealth of comedic talent gave the first two installments a madcap energy that somewhat forgave their childish premises. Night at the Museum: Secret of the Tomb, the third and supposedly final edition in the franchise, is nothing more than an uncomfortably transparent contractual obligation."

=== Accolades ===
Award	Category	Recipient(s)	Result	Ref.
Teen Choice Awards	Choice Comedy Movie		Nominated	
Teen Choice Awards	Choice Comedy Movie Actor	Ben Stiller	Nominated	
Kids' Choice Awards	Favorite Movie Actor	Ben Stiller	Won	

== Sequel ==
In August 2019, following the purchase of 21st Century Fox and its assets by The Walt Disney Company, Disney CEO Bob Iger announced that a fully animated sequel to Night at the Museum was in development. In October 2020, the movie was officially titled Night at the Museum: Kahmunrah Rises Again. The project is traditionally animated and production began on November 2, 2020. The plot centers around Larry's son, Nick, who is hesitant to follow in his father's footsteps as nightwatchman. Shawn Levy served as executive producer with Matt Danner directing the film. The film was released on December 9, 2022, as a Disney+ exclusive film.

== Home media ==
Night at the Museum: Secret of the Tomb was released on Blu-ray and DVD on March 10, 2015, by 20th Century Fox Home Entertainment. The film debuted in second place on the home media charts behind The Hunger Games: Mockingjay – Part 1. Overall, Night at the Museum: Secret of the Tomb was the eighth best-selling film on home video with 1.5 million units sold and earning a revenue of $24.2 million.

== See also ==
- List of films featuring dinosaurs
