= Patrick Gallagher (actor) =

Canadian actor (born 1968)

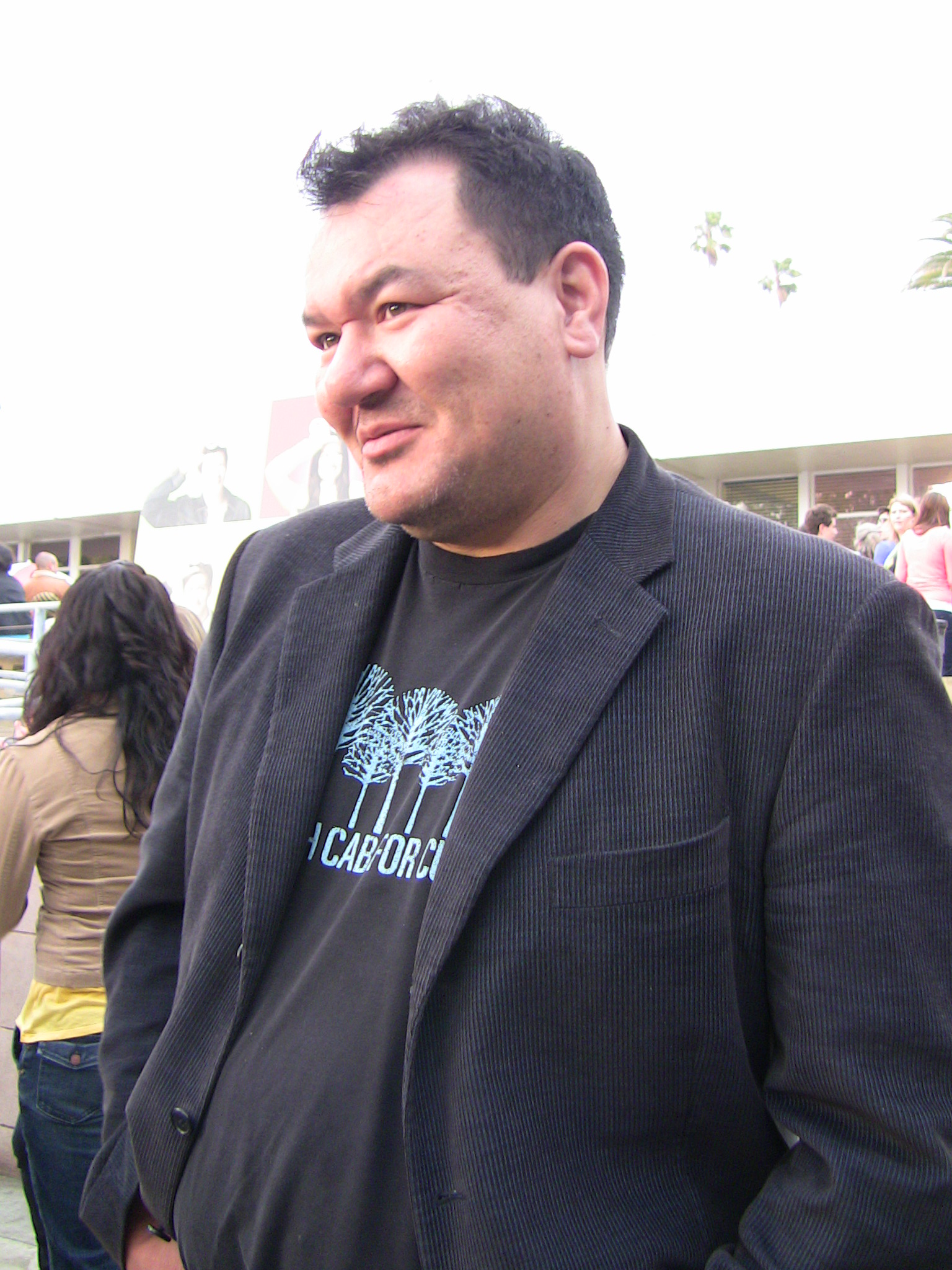
- Gallagher at the Glee premiere party in Santa Monica, California in 2009
- Born: Patrick James Gallagher; February 21, 1968 (age 58); New Westminster, British Columbia, Canada
- Education: National Theatre School of Canada
- Occupations: Actor; voice actor
- Years active: 1994–present

Patrick James Gallagher (born February 21, 1968) is a Canadian actor. He is known for his roles as Attila the Hun in the Night at the Museum films, Coach Ken Tanaka on the first season of Glee (2009–10), and Joe Finn in Da Vinci's Inquest and Da Vinci's City Hall.

Gallagher won a BAFTA Games Award for Performer in a Supporting Role nomination for his work in the video game Ghost of Tsushima.

== Early life ==
Gallagher was born in New Westminster, British Columbia, and grew up in nearby Chilliwack. Born to an Irish American father and a Chinese Canadian mother, Gallagher holds dual American and Canadian citizenship. He is a graduate of the National Theatre School of Canada.

== Career ==
Gallagher is known for his television roles as Joe Finn in Da Vinci's Inquest, the alcohol salesman in Entourage, Leon in The Line, Farhod the Fierce in Pair of Kings, and Ken Tanaka in Glee, and his film roles as Awkward Davies in Master and Commander: The Far Side of the World and Gary the bartender in Sideways. He played Attila the Hun in Night at the Museum and its sequels, Chow in True Blood, Colquitt in Final Destination 3, Anderson in Severed: Forest of the Dead, and the head of security, Hugo, in the short-lived series Endgame. Gallagher made guest appearances in Battlestar Galactica, Smallville, Hawaii Five-0, Intelligence, NCIS: Los Angeles, Fuller House and Psych in addition to Hell's Kitchen as a guest for the 100th dinner service. He landed the recurring role of a prison guard on the ABC soap opera General Hospital. He voiced Khotun Khan in Ghost of Tsushima.

== Filmography ==
=== Film ===
Year	Title	Role	Notes	Ref.
1996	Moving Target	Jonish Kukoc		
1997	Pale Saints	Lowbrow		
1999	Apocalypse II: Revelation	Jake Goss		
2000	Apocalypse III: Tribulation	Jake Goss		
2001	Apocalypse IV: Judgment	Jake Goss		
2001	Full Disclosure	Larry Quinn		
2003	Master and Commander: The Far Side of the World	Awkward Davies, Able Seaman		
2004	Walking Tall	Keith		
2004	Sideways	Gary, The Bartender		
2005	Severed	Anderson		
2006	Final Destination 3	Colquitt		
2006	Night at the Museum	Attila The Leading Hun		
2008	Street Kings	LAPD Captain		
2009	Night at the Museum: Battle of the Smithsonian	Attila The Leading Hun		
2010	Dancing Ninja	Sabu		
2014	Night at the Museum: Secret of the Tomb	Attila The Leading Hun		
2017	Downsizing	Drunk Guy at the Bar		
2019	A Dog's Way Home	Teo		
2019	Captain Marvel	Security Chief		
2020	The Christmas Chronicles 2	Mass State Police Troop		
2024	The Tiger's Apprentice	Dog (voice)		

=== Television ===
Year	Title	Role	Notes	Ref.
1994	RoboCop: The Series	Security Guard	Episode: "The Future of Law Enforcement: Part 1" (S 1:Ep 1 – Pilot)	
1994	Kung Fu: The Legend Continues	Bodyguard	Episode: "Tournament" (S 2:Ep 9)	
1995	Forever Knight	Michael	Episode: "Sons of Belial" (S 3: Ep 11)	
1997	Bad to the Bone	Trucker	Made-for-TV Movie directed by Bill L. Norton	
1997	Earth: Final Conflict	Prison Guard	Episode: "Avatar" (S 1:Ep 4)	
1997	F/X: The Series	Macho	Episode: "Spanish Harlem" (S 2:Ep 9)	
1998	My Date with the President's Daughter	Secret Service Agent	Part of The Wonderful World of Disney	
2000	Mom's Got a Date with a Vampire	Bone		
2003	Smallville	Bartender	Episode: "Perry" (S3:E5)	
2006	Stargate Atlantis	Vonos	Episode: "Inferno"	
2007	Masters of Horror	Barman	Episode: "The Black Cat"	
2008–2009	True Blood	Lin Chow	2 episodes	
2009–2010	Glee	Ken Tanaka	Season 1; 10 episodes	
2010	Hawaii Five-0	Carlos Bagoyo	Episode: "Nalowale"	
2010	Entourage	Randy	Episode: "Tequila and Coke"	
2011	Suits	Joe, The Security Guard	Episode:"The Shelf Life"	
2011	Endgame	Hugo, Head of Hotel Security	Season 1; 19 episodes	
2012	Psych	Mercer	Episode: "True Grits"	
2013	Almost Human	Tony Han	Episode: "The Bonds"	
2013	Borealis	Taq	Television film	
2015–2017	iZombie	Jeremy Chu	Seasons 2–3	
2016	Fuller House	Chief Mulrooney	Episode: "Secrets, Lies and Firetrucks"	
2016	Unclaimed	Jeff Keeley	Television film	
2017–present	General Hospital	Prison Guard	Recurring	
2018	Lucifer	Barry	Episode: "Orange Is the New Maze"	
2018	Dirty John	Detective Dave Nissely	Episode: "One Shoe"	
2018–2019	Siren	Dr. Abbott	4 episodes	
2019	Wayne	Mr. Hernandez	2 episodes	
2019	Project Blue Book	Randal Kavanaugh	Episode: "Foo Fighters"	
2019	The Twilight Zone	Jack Mongoyak	Episode: "A Traveler"	
2019	American Princess	Friar Woodruff	5 episodes	
2019	Creeped Out	Coach Carter	Episode: "The Takedown"	
2019	S.W.A.T.	Wally	Episode: "Track"	
2020	Fortunate Son	William Sullivan	8 episodes	
2020	Station 19	Keller	Episode: "I'll Be Seeing You"	
2020–2022	Big Sky	Sherriff Tubb	Recurring cast	
2021–2023	Joe Pickett	Sheriff Barnum	15 episodes	
2023	Blue Eye Samurai	Lord Daichi (voice)	5 episodes	
2025	Wayward	Chief Bartell		
2025	Tracker	Sheriff Paul Holt	1 episode	

=== Video games ===
Year	Title	Voice role	Notes	Ref.
2006	Company of Heroes	Unknown		
2009	Night at the Museum: Battle of the Smithsonian	Attila The Hun		
2010	Halo: Reach	Trooper 3		
2015	Rainbow Six: Siege	Grim		
2018	Red Dead Redemption 2	The Local Pedestrian Population		
2019	Tom Clancy's Ghost Recon Breakpoint	Mads Schultz		
2020	Ghost of Tsushima	Khotun Khan		
2022	Guild Wars 2: End of Dragons	Minister Li, Additional Voices		
