= Night at the Museum: Battle of the Smithsonian =

2009 film directed by Shawn Levy

- Theatrical release poster
- Directed by: Shawn Levy
- Written by: Robert Ben Garant; Thomas Lennon
- Based on: Characters by: Robert Ben Garant; Thomas Lennon
- Produced by: Shawn Levy; Chris Columbus; Michael Barnathan
- Starring: Ben Stiller; Amy Adams; Owen Wilson; Hank Azaria; Christopher Guest; Alain Chabat; Robin Williams
- Cinematography: John Schwartzman
- Edited by: Don Zimmerman; Dean Zimmerman
- Music by: Alan Silvestri
- Production companies: 20th Century Fox; Dune Entertainment; 1492 Pictures; 21 Laps Entertainment
- Distributed by: 20th Century Fox
- Release date: May 22, 2009
- Running time: 105 minutes
- Country: United States
- Language: English
- Budget: $150 million
- Box office: $413.1 million

Night at the Museum: Battle of the Smithsonian is a 2009 American fantasy comedy film directed by Shawn Levy, and written by Robert Ben Garant and Thomas Lennon. The film stars Ben Stiller, Amy Adams, Owen Wilson, Hank Azaria, Christopher Guest, Alain Chabat and Robin Williams. It is the second film in the Night at the Museum series, and the sequel to Night at the Museum (2006).

The film follows the story of ex-museum security guard Larry Daley, as he infiltrates the Smithsonian Institution's archives to rescue most of the Museum of Natural History's exhibits upon Jedediah and Octavius's request, as they feel that being shipped there is a mistake.

The film was theatrically released on May 22, 2009, by 20th Century Fox. It received mixed reviews and became a box-office success, grossing $413 million on a $150 million budget. A third film, Night at the Museum: Secret of the Tomb, was released in 2014, and an animated sequel, Night at the Museum: Kahmunrah Rises Again, was released in 2022.

== Plot ==
Two years after the events of the first film, Larry Daley has left his job as night guard at the Museum of Natural History to start a company selling his own inventions on direct response television. He visits the museum and learns that most exhibits are being moved to the Smithsonian Institution archives in Washington, D.C. and replaced with holographic displays. Furthermore, the Tablet of Ahkmenrah will remain, leaving the departing exhibits unable to come to life at night.

Larry receives a panicked phone call from miniature cowboy Jedediah, who explains that Dexter the monkey stole the tablet, the Smithsonian is now alive, and they are under attack by Ahkmenrah's older brother Kahmunrah. Determined to save them, Larry travels to Washington, D.C. and poses as a night guard to sneak into the archives, where he finds his friends trapped by Kahmunrah, who plans to use the tablet's powers to open the Gate of the Underworld and conquer the world.

Aided by Major General George A. Custer, who is captured, Larry is joined by Amelia Earhart. They evade Kahmunrah's soldiers inside the photograph of V-J Day in Times Square, leading Kahmunrah to enlist Ivan the Terrible, Napoleon Bonaparte and Al Capone to retrieve the tablet. Larry is captured, but when the tablet fails to open the Gate, Kahmunrah traps Jedediah in an hourglass and gives Larry one hour to decipher the tablet's combination.

Amelia falls in love with Larry, and the statue of Abraham Lincoln at the Lincoln Memorial mistakes them for a couple as they reach the National Air and Space Museum, where Larry has to prevent all the rockets and aircraft from taking off. They encounter various historic aviation figures, including the Wright brothers, the Tuskegee Airmen, and Able the space monkey, while Albert Einstein bobbleheads explain that the tablet's combination is the value of pi. Napoleon, Ivan, Capone and their troops arrive, prompting Larry and Amelia to escape in the Wright Flyer.

They crash into the Smithsonian, where Kahmunrah uses the combination to open the Gate and summons Horus warriors. Miniature Roman general Octavius arrives with the statue of Lincoln, frightening the warriors back to the Underworld. Amelia gathers allies, including Larry's friends and Custer, leading to a climactic battle. Larry helps Custer overcome his fear of repeating the Battle of Little Big Horn, while Octavius rescues Jedediah. Larry recovers the tablet and turns Capone, Napoleon and Ivan against each other. Armed with his flashlight, Larry duels a khopesh-wielding Kahmunrah as Amelia reopens the Gate, allowing Larry to banish Kahmunrah to the Underworld.

After she flies Larry and the New York City exhibits home, Amelia reveals that she knows she is only a wax figure, and that she cannot return to the Smithsonian before dawn. She and Larry share a kiss before she flies away towards the Smithsonian, almost taking a wrong turn to Canada. Two months later, Larry has sold his company and made an anonymous donation to renovate the Natural History Museum and extend its nighttime visiting hours when the exhibits are alive; believed to be animatronics and hired reenactors, the exhibits now interact with visitors. Back in his job as night guard, Larry meets a visitor named Tess who bears a striking resemblance to Amelia and also tends to get lost.

== Cast ==
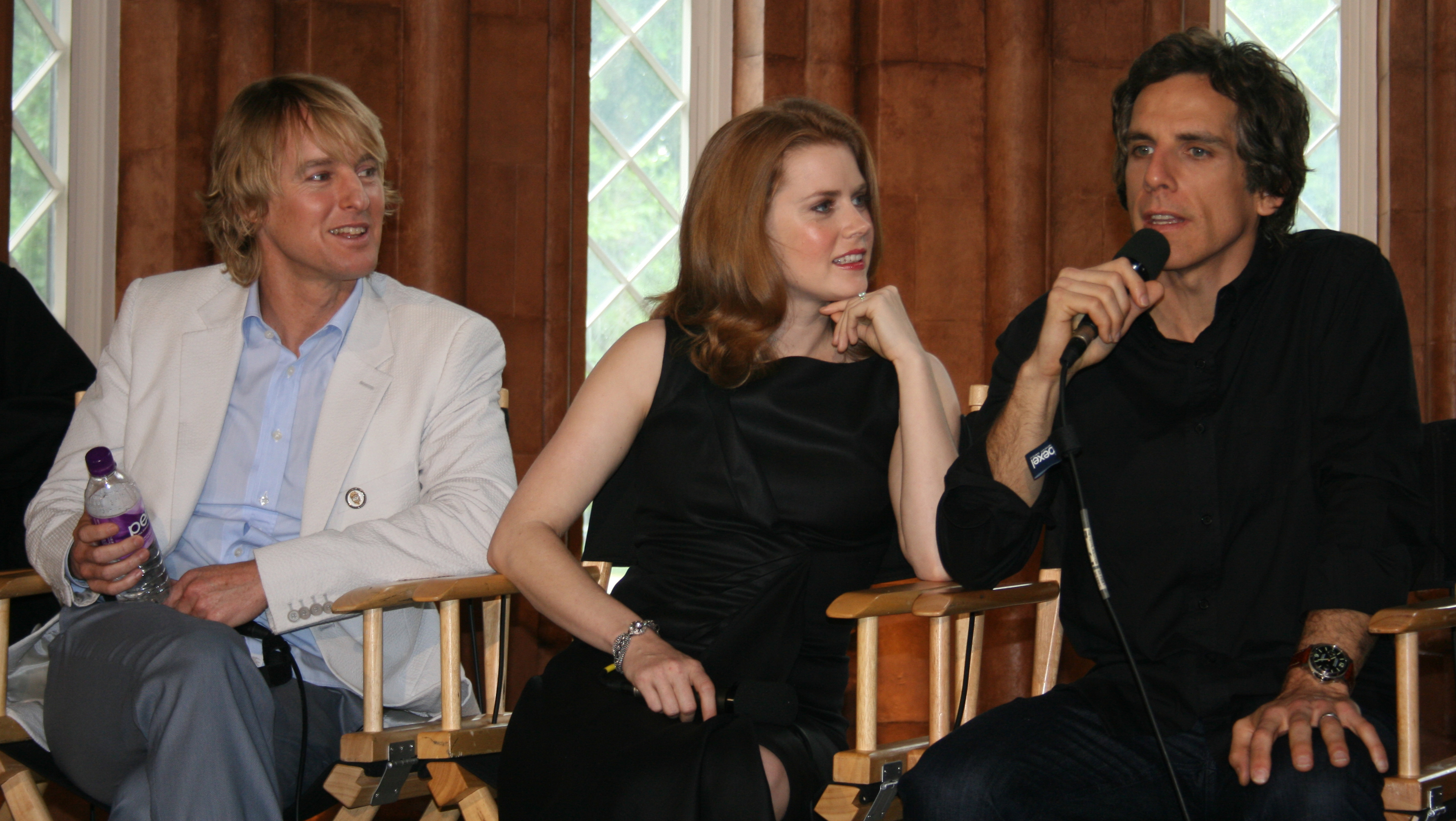
Owen Wilson, Amy Adams and Ben Stiller at a panel for the film in May 2009.

- Ben Stiller as Larry Daley, a night security guard and Amelia's love interest.
- Amy Adams as Amelia Earhart, a wax model of the first woman to fly across the Atlantic Ocean and Larry's love interest.
  - Adams additionally portrays Tess, a young woman at the end of the film who resembles Earhart.
- Hank Azaria as Kahmunrah, a pharaoh who is Ahkmenrah's malevolent elder brother.
  - Azaria additionally provides the voices of The Thinker and the Lincoln Memorial's statue of Abraham Lincoln.
- Robin Williams as Theodore Roosevelt, a wax sculpture of the 26th President of the United States who is Larry's mentor.
  - Williams additionally portrays a bronze bust of the president.
- Owen Wilson as Jedediah, a cowboy minifigure and Octavius' best friend.
- Steve Coogan as Octavius, a Roman general minifigure and Jedediah's best friend.
- Christopher Guest as Ivan the Terrible, the historic Tsar of Russia who allies with Kahmunrah.
- Alain Chabat as Napoleon Bonaparte, the leader of the First French Empire who allies with Kahmunrah.
- Jon Bernthal as Al Capone, a photographic standee of the gangster of the same name and founder of the Chicago Outfit who allies with Kahmunrah.
- Bill Hader as George Armstrong Custer, a military commander whom Larry befriends.
- Mizuo Peck as Sacagawea, a polyurethane model of the Lemhi Shoshone woman who guided Meriwether Lewis and William Clark and Teddy's girlfriend.
- Rami Malek as Ahkmenrah, a mummy of a pharaoh who becomes a fully living human at night and is the benevolent younger brother of Kahmunrah.
- Patrick Gallagher as Attila the Hun, a wax model of the leader of the Huns.
- Brad Garrett as the voice of the Museum of Natural History's Easter Island Head.
- Kerry van der Griend, Matthew Harrison and Rick Dobran as wax models of Neanderthals.
- Ricky Gervais as Dr. Leslie McPhee, the curator at the Museum of Natural History and Larry's boss.
- Jake Cherry as Nick Daley, the son of Larry Daley.
- George Foreman as himself.
- Shawn Levy as an actor portraying a father in a Daley Devices infomercial.
- Mindy Kaling as a docent at the National Air and Space Museum.
- Ed Helms (uncredited) as Larry's best friend and assistant.
- Jonah Hill (uncredited) as Brandon (pronounced /ˈbrʌndən/ BRUN-dən), a security guard at the Smithsonian.
- Randy Lee, Darryl Quon, Gerald Wong and Paul Chih-Ping Cheng as Atilla's fellow Huns.
- Jonas Brothers as the Cherubs.
- Jay Baruchel as Joey Motorola, a sailor who resides in the V-J Day in Times Square photograph.
- Alberta Mayne as Greta Zimmer Friedman.
- Eugene Levy as a group of Albert Einstein bobbleheads.
- Keith Powell and Craig Robinson as the Tuskegee Airman.
- Clint Howard and Matty Finochio as a pair of flight controllers at the National Air and Space Museum.
- Thomas Lennon and Robert Ben Garant as Orville and Wilbur Wright, respectively.
- Caroll Spinney as Oscar the Grouch, a major character from the Sesame Street franchise who tries to ally with Kahmunrah but is dismissed because the ruler judges him to be "vaguely grouchy".
- Thomas Morley as Darth Vader, a major character from the Star Wars franchise who tries to ally with Kahmunrah but is turned away because the ruler judges him as "evil, asthmatic" and "a robot".
- Crystal the Monkey as Dexter and Able, a pair of mischievous stuffed capuchin monkeys.

== Production ==
=== Development ===
Writers Robert Ben Garant and Thomas Lennon confirmed to Dark Horizons that they were writing a sequel to Night at the Museum, originally with the tentative title Another Night at the Museum. The writers said, "There'll be existing characters and plenty of new ones."

20th Century Fox announced that the sequel Night at the Museum: Battle of the Smithsonian would be released during the Memorial Day weekend in 2009. Ben Stiller would return for the sequel, with Shawn Levy returning as director.

=== Filming ===
The film was filmed in Vancouver and Montreal, with select scenes filmed inside the Smithsonian in Washington, D.C. A scene was shot at the Lincoln Memorial on the night of May 21, 2008. Scenes were also shot at the American Museum of Natural History in New York City on August 18 and 20, 2008.

The trailer was released with Bedtime Stories, Yes Man and Marley & Me (also starring Owen Wilson) in December 2008. The trailer accompanied the film Bride Wars in January, The Pink Panther 2 in February, and Dragonball Evolution in April 2009. The film was also promoted as an opening skit on American Idol, where a replica of the American Idol judge seats are being held at the real Smithsonian Institution.

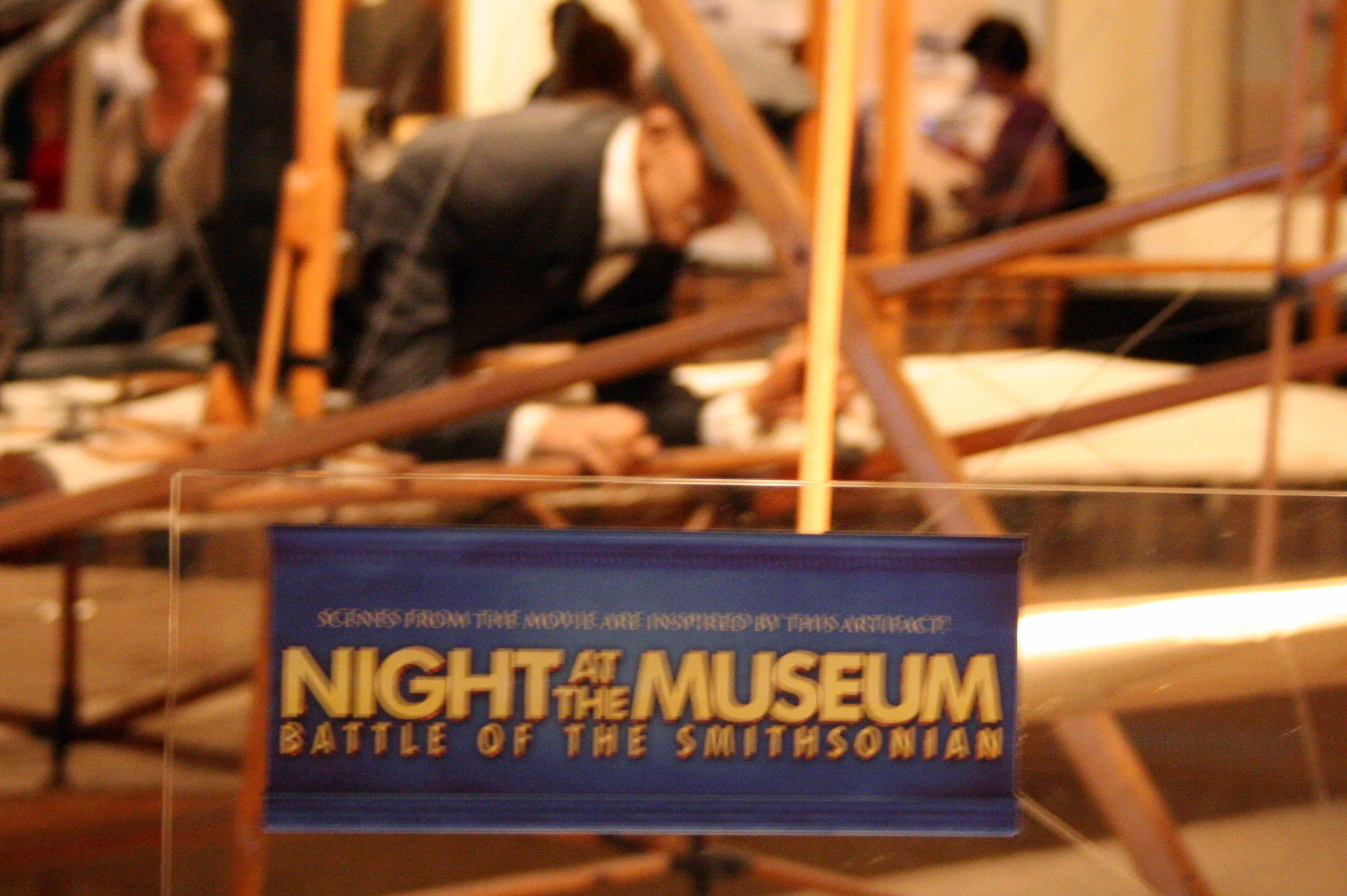
Night at the Museum label on the Wright Flyer exhibit in the National Air and Space Museum.

Filmmakers lent the Smithsonian Institution props used in the movie that were displayed in the Smithsonian Castle, including the pile of artifacts featured in the film. The Smithsonian also made a brochure available online and at museum visitor service desks outlining where to find artifacts.

In 2009, numerous artifacts that inspired the film were on display at Smithsonian Museums along the National Mall. Many of the artifacts were labeled with "Night at the Museum" logos. Gift shops at the Smithsonian also sold a replica of the Einstein bobblehead, created specifically as a tie-in to the film.

== Music ==
Alan Silvestri returned to score the sequel.

Varèse Sarabande issued the score on May 19, 2009.

== Release ==
=== Theatrical ===
A trailer for Night at the Museum: Battle of the Smithsonian was released on December 19, 2008. The film was theatrically released on May 22, 2009, in the United States.

=== Home media ===
Night at the Museum: Battle of the Smithsonian was released on DVD and Blu-ray on December 1, 2009, by 20th Century Fox Home Entertainment.

An alternate ending included on the DVD and Blu-ray releases of the film feature the return of Dick Van Dyke as Cecil Fredericks, Bill Cobbs as Reginald, and Mickey Rooney as Gus.

== Reception ==
=== Box office ===
At the end of its box-office run, Night at the Museum: Battle of the Smithsonian earned a gross of $177 million in North America and $236 million in other territories, for a worldwide total of $413 million against a budget of $150 million.

On Friday, May 22, 2009, its opening day, the film's estimated gross was $16 million; for the second day, the film grossed $20 million; and for the third day, the gross was $19 million, coming in ahead of Terminator Salvation (which was released on Thursday) in 4,096 theaters at number 1, reaching up to $54.1 million, with a $13,226 per-theater average during the Memorial Day weekend. By comparison, Night at the Museum reached up to $30 million in its opening weekend in December 2006. For its second weekend, the film grossed $24.35 million, and for its third weekend, it grossed $14.6 million.

For the opening weekend of May 22, 2009, the film grossed $49 million while playing in theaters of 56 territories. In the UK, the film earned $6.6 million, $5.23 million in Russia, and $5.05 million in France. The largest markets in other territories were the UK, Japan, Germany, Australia and France, where the film grossed $32.8 million, $21.49 million, $18.78 million, $14.03 million and $13.3 million, respectively. The film was exhibited on 160 IMAX screens, and contributed $5.4 million of the gross. The top grossing IMAX venue was the Smithsonian. With the film, the Smithsonian had hopes of a financial boost like having its name planted on cereal boxes.

=== Critical response ===
The film received mixed reviews from critics. On Rotten Tomatoes, the film has a 43% approval rating, based on 168 reviews, with an average score of 5.1/10. The site's critical consensus reads: "Night at the Museum: Battle at the Smithsonian is busy enough to keep the kids interested but the slapstick goes overboard and the special effects (however well executed) throw the production into mania." Metacritic gave the film a weighted average score of 42 out of 100 based on reviews from 31 critics, indicating "mixed or average" reviews. In CinemaScore polls conducted during the opening weekend, audiences gave Night at the Museum: Battle of the Smithsonian an average grade of "B+" on a scale of A+ to F.

Critics praised Amy Adams's and Hank Azaria's performances. Michael Phillips of the Chicago Tribune awarded the film 3 stars out of 4, stating that "[Adams]'s terrific – a sparkling screen presence". Owen Gleiberman of Entertainment Weekly gave the film a "B+", stating, "Battle of the Smithsonian has plenty of life. But it's Adams who gives it zing."

Perry Seibert of TV Guide gave the film 2 stars out of 4, with praise for "Azaria, a master of comic timing. His grandiose, yet slightly fey bad guy is equally funny when he's chewing out minions as he is when deliberating if Oscar the Grouch and Darth Vader are evil enough to join his team." Michael Rechtshaffen of The Hollywood Reporter and A.O. Scott of The New York Times enjoyed both performances.

One critic, Scott Tobias of The A.V. Club, panned the movie for its excessive use of special effects. He described the film as "a baffling master plot and a crowded pileup of special effects in search of something to do". Roger Ebert of the Chicago Sun Times awarded the film 1½ stars out of 4, saying, "Its premise is lame, its plot relentlessly predictable, its characters with personalities that would distinguish picture books."

=== Accolades ===
List of awards and nominations
| Year | Award / Film Festival | Category | Recipient(s) | Result | Ref. |
|---|---|---|---|---|---|
| 2009 | Teen Choice Award | Choice Comedy Movie | Night at the Museum: Battle of the Smithsonian | Won | |
| 2009 | Teen Choice Award | Choice Comedy Movie Actor | Ben Stiller | Nominated | |
| 2009 | Teen Choice Award | Choice Comedy Movie Actress | Amy Adams | Nominated | |
| 2009 | Teen Choice Award | Choice Movie Villain | Hank Azaria | Nominated | |
| 2010 | MTV Movie Award | Best Comedic Performance | Ben Stiller | Nominated | |
| 2010 | People's Choice Awards | Favorite Family Movie | Night at the Museum: Battle of the Smithsonian | Nominated | |
| 2010 | Visual Effects Society Awards | Outstanding Models and Miniatures in a Feature Motion Picture | Ian Hunter, Forest Fischer, Robert Chapin, Tony Chen for the "National Air and Space Museum Escape" | Nominated | |

== Video game ==
The video game based on the film was released on May 5, 2009. It was fairly well received in comparison to the majority of film-based video games, netting a 7.5 out of 10 from IGN.com.

== Sequels ==
Ben Stiller admitted that a sequel was "a possibility", and on January 21, 2010, co-writer Thomas Lennon said to Access Hollywood, "That after the success of two Night at the Museum films, it's no surprise that 20th Century Fox is looking to develop a third and that those suspicions are indeed true and how could you not? I think it's a really outstanding idea to do Night at the Museum 3, in fact," he said. "I wonder if someone's not even already working on a script for that," he added with a raised eyebrow. "I cannot confirm that for a fact, but I cannot deny it for a fact either... It might be in the works." In an interview, Stiller confirmed the sequel. However, he said that it was only in the "ideas stage".

It was announced in February 2013 that the film, directed by Shawn Levy, would be released on December 25, 2014. On September 10, 2013, it was announced that shooting would start in February 2014. On November 8, 2013, English actor Dan Stevens was cast as Sir Lancelot. On November 15, 2013, it was announced Skyler Gisondo would be replacing Jake Cherry in the role of Nicky Daley. On December 18, 2013, it was announced that Robin Williams, Stiller, and Ricky Gervais would be returning for the sequel. On January 9, 2014, it was announced that Rebel Wilson would play a security guard in the British Museum. On January 14, 2014, the film's release date was moved forward from December 25, 2014, to December 19, 2014. On January 23, 2014, it was announced Ben Kingsley would play an Egyptian Pharaoh at the British Museum. Principal photography and production began on January 27, 2014. In May 2014, principal photography ended.

On August 6, 2019, following the purchase of 21st Century Fox and its assets by The Walt Disney Company, Disney CEO Bob Iger announced that a fully animated sequel to Night at the Museum was in development. Night at the Museum: Kahmunrah Rises Again was released on December 9, 2022, on the streaming service Disney+.

== See also ==
- List of films featuring dinosaurs
