= Night at the Museum: Battle of the Smithsonian (video game) =

2009 video game

- North American box art
- Developers: Amaze Entertainment; Pipeworks Software (PC, Wii, X360); The Fizz Factor (DS); Gameloft (BlackBerry)
- Publishers: Majesco; Gameloft (BlackBerry)
- Platforms: BlackBerry, Java ME, Wii, Microsoft Windows, Nintendo DS, Xbox 360
- Release: BlackBerry; April 21, 2009; Nintendo DS, Wii, Windows, Xbox 360: NA: May 13, 2009; EU: May 22, 2009 (Wii, X360); EU: May 29, 2009 (DS)
- Genre: Action-adventure
- Mode: Single-player

Night at the Museum: Battle of the Smithsonian - The Video Game (known as Night at the Museum 2 in other countries) is an action-adventure video game developed by Amaze Entertainment and Pipeworks Software, and published by Majesco for Wii, Microsoft Windows, Nintendo DS, and Xbox 360. The BlackBerry and Java ME versions were developed and published by Gameloft. The video game is based on the film of the same name. Ben Stiller reprises his role in the film as the voice of Larry Daley but none of the other cast members from the movie reprise their roles.

== Gameplay ==
Gameplay will involve Larry exploring certain exhibits in the museum. Platforming involves Larry using a rope to swing from hooks and a flashlight that activates different contraptions.

Battling requires Larry to lead his enemies to a certain painting or statue and activating it, causing the object to attack (ex. Thinker will swipe at a passing enemy, an ocean painting releases a shark, etc.). Larry will be able to pilot vehicles, which are the Apollo Lunar Module, a Pitcairn Autogyro, and Rexy the T-rex.

== Plot ==
The plot of the game is almost the same as the plot of the film.

Larry Daley is the CEO and founder of the company Daley Devices, and learns that the Museum of Natural History, where he once worked as a night guard and found out that the exhibits come to life every night, is having renovations, replacing the wax figures and stuffed animals with state-of-the-art 3D holograms. Larry returns to the museum, where he learns from Jedidiah the miniature cowboy and Octavius the Roman general that because of the renovations, they will be shipped to the Federal Archives (Octavius calls it the Imperial Archives) under the Smithsonian Museum, aside from Rexy the T-Rex skeleton, Ahkmenrah and his tablet, (which is the source which makes the exhibits come to life) the Easter Island Head, and other signature exhibits will be staying. Larry meets with Ahkmenrah, who teaches him about the several ingots the tablet consists of, explaining that each ingot has a different power. He tells Larry he can use the tablet's powers using his flashlight and key-chain.

After returning home, Larry receives a call from Jed, informing him that the tablet was stolen by the monkey Dexter while all of them were supposed to be in federal archives without the tablet. Larry rushes to the Smithsonian in Washington DC. He steals a key card from a guard and enters the Federal Archive, and gets the tablet. However, night comes (Larry calls it "magic time" throughout the video game), causing everything to come to life. This brings the evil and power-hungry Kahmunrah, who is Ahkmenrah's evil brother, to life, imprisoning Jed, Dexter and the others. Larry is threatened by Kahmunrah, and is forced to give him the tablet. Kahmunrah smashes the tablet to pieces (an event that did not happen in the film), giving the ingots in the tablet to several other exhibits who are on his side (such as Napoleon, Ivan the Terrible and Al Capone) who hide the ingots. Larry escapes by releasing a squid, who captures Kahmunrah and his servants, escaping with the tablet with only one ingot left. Larry tracks down the exhibits following Kahmunrah, and finds the ingots in several places in the museum, such as the Art Gallery (where he steals the ingot from Ivan the terrible, fixing the exhibits Ivan damaged on the way), the Air and Space Museum (where he steals an ingot from Napoleon) and so on.

In the end, there is a huge battle over the finished tablet, which is won by Larry's friends and Larry banishes Kahmunrah to the Underworld. Like the movie, the game ends with the museum being open late at night and Larry telling his boss Dr. McPhee that he stuck motors in the exhibits, while he actually just brought the tablet home, and having the exhibits come back to life.

== Reception ==
Reception

Aggregate score
Aggregator	Score		
Aggregator	DS	Wii	Xbox 360
Metacritic	61/100	54/100	50/100

Review scores
Publication	Score		
Publication	DS	Wii	Xbox 360
GamesMaster	N/A	49%	49%
GameSpot	N/A	4.5/10	4.5/10
GameZone	6/10	7.7/10	6/10
IGN	6.2/10	7.5/10	7.5/10
Jeuxvideo.com	12/20	12/20	12/20
NGamer	N/A	34%	N/A
Official Nintendo Magazine	N/A	54%	N/A
Official Xbox Magazine (UK)	N/A	N/A	4/10
Official Xbox Magazine (US)	N/A	N/A	6/10

The DS, Wii, and Xbox 360 versions received "mixed" reviews according to the review aggregation website Metacritic.

IGN were the most positive source for the Wii and Xbox 360 versions, saying that they were "Not exhilarating, not mind-blowing, but surprisingly solid. Good job, Pipeworks, you made a game that's educational [and] simple, and, best of all, never outstays its welcome." Official Xbox Magazine called it "A solid choice for couch time with the kids." GameSpot, however, said of the Wii and Xbox 360 versions in its early review, "A few cute moments can't disguise this movie tie-in's biggest problem: its criminally short length."

== See also ==
- Smithsonian Institution
