= Mizuo Peck =

American actress (born 1977)

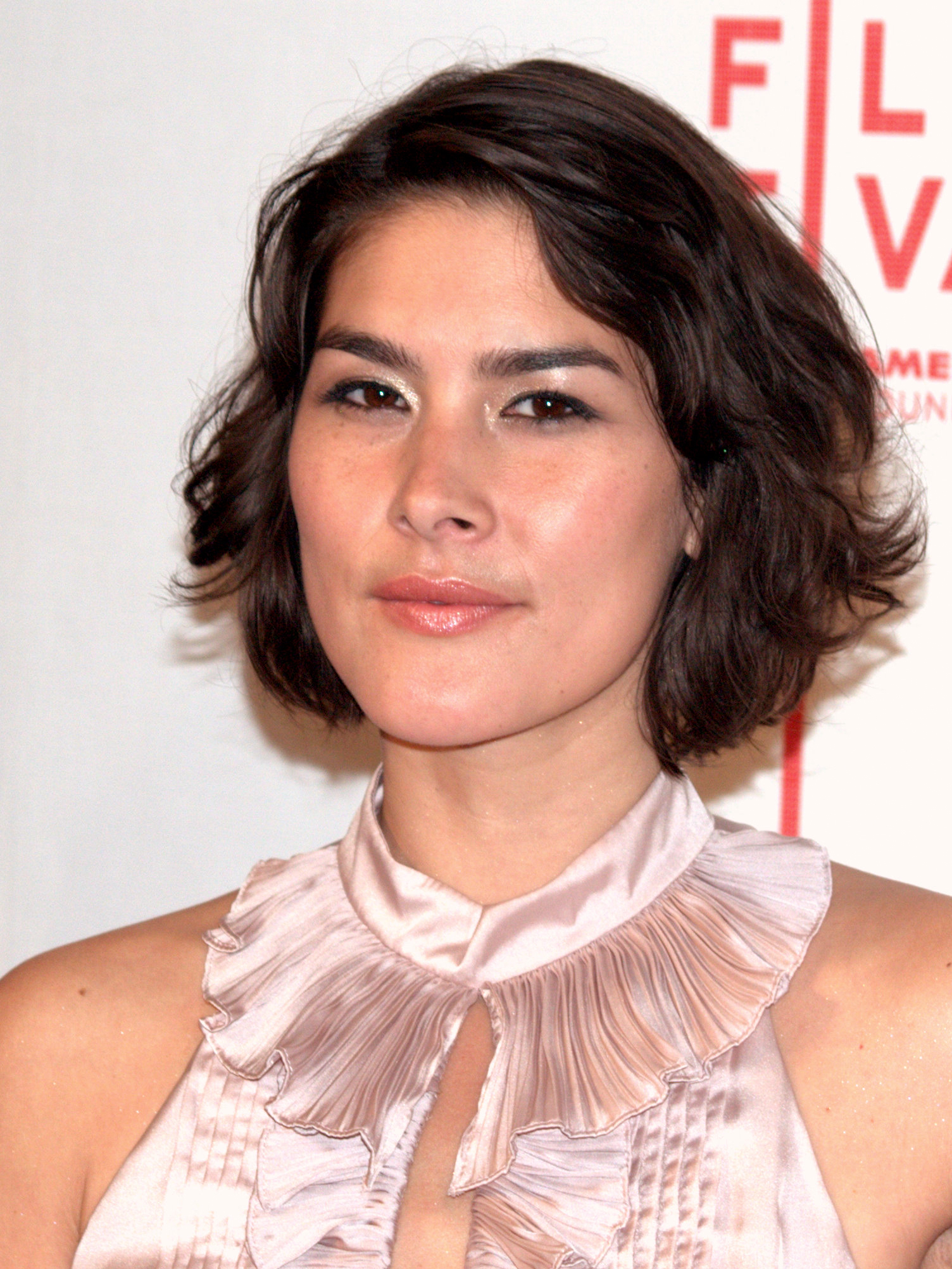
- Peck at the 2009 premiere of PoliWood
- Born: August 18, 1977 (age 48); New York City, New York, US
- Education: State University of New York, Purchase (BFA)
- Occupation: Actress
- Years active: 2000–present
- Children: 1

Mizuo Peck (born August 18, 1977) is an American actress. She is best known for playing Sacagawea in the Night at the Museum film series.

== Life and career ==
Peck was born and raised in New York. Her father was from Hamden, Connecticut. As a child, Peck was a member of the TADA! Youth Theater. She graduated with a BFA degree in Theater from the SUNY Purchase Conservatory of Theatre Arts. Peck joined the Screen Actor's Guild on her 18th birthday and has done many commercials, voice-overs and print campaigns for Levi's, Verizon, Kitchen Aid and Oil of Olay.

Peck's most notable role may be the historical Native American figure Sacagawea in the Night at the Museum film series. Her other film credits include A Case of You, Almost in Love, and Scenes of the Crime. Her television credits include Law & Order: Criminal Intent, a recurring role on All My Children, and the sci-fi police drama Witchblade.

On stage, Peck has done plays that were part of the New York International Fringe Festival, the Samuel French Play Festival, and the New Performance Series at the Incubator Arts Project. At the Public Theater, she performed Suzan-Lori Parks 365 Days/365 Plays and All's Well That Ends Well as a company member of the Shakespeare Lab Program.

Peck has been photographed for French Vogue as well as for the cover of L'Uomo Vogue. At the Whitney Biennial in 2010, her voice accompanied an art installation by the Bruce High Quality Foundation.

== Filmography ==
=== Film ===
Year	Title	Role	Notes
2001	Scenes of the Crime	Sharon	
2006	Night at the Museum	Sacagawea	
2008	Magritte Moment	Karen	Short
2008	Naked: A Guy's Musical	Wife	Short
2008	Peace of Mind	Angelica	Short
2009	Night at the Museum: Battle of the Smithsonian	Sacagawea	
2011	Almost in Love	Kiko	
2013	Kyôryû wo horô!		
2013	A Case of You	Jemily	
2014	Night at the Museum: Secret of the Tomb	Sacagawea	

=== Television ===
Year	Title	Role	Notes
2000	Nicht heulen, Husky	Maggie	TV movie
2002	Witchblade	Mija Woo	Episode: Nailed
2003	All My Children	Tia	Episode #1.8613
2006	Law & Order: Criminal Intent	Sheila	Episode: Wasichu
2018	This is A.I.	Narration	TV movie
2019	Madam Secretary	Cop	Episode: Valor

== Other work ==
- Starred in Thee Shambels' music video The Girl at the Bottom of the World (2013).
- Cameos in Clay Aiken's music video The Way.
- Article in My Name Is... section of Vapors Magazine.
