= The Night at the Museum =

1993 children's picture book by Milan Trenc

- Author: Milan Trenc
- Language: English
- Genre: Children's literature
- Publisher: Barron's Educational Series
- Publication date: 1993
- Publication place: United States
- Media type: Paperback
- Pages: 32 pages
- ISBN: 0-7641-3631-3
- OCLC: 76412691

The Night at the Museum, published in 1993, is a children's picture book written and illustrated by Croatian illustrator Milan Trenc. This book is Trenc's best known title, and in 2006 was adapted as a feature film titled Night at the Museum. That same year, the movie was novelized by Leslie Goldman as a book for young adults. The story tells about Hector the night watchman who works at New York City's American Museum of Natural History. The book was followed by Another Night at the Museum, published in 2013.

== Original storyline ==
Trenc's original book, The Night at the Museum, is a picture story book for children about Hector, a night watchman at the Museum of Natural History in New York City, New York. On his first night at the job, he wakes up to find all of the dinosaur skeletons have vanished. He finds nothing looking around the museum, Central Park, and at the planetarium next door. Eventually Hector discovers that the dinosaurs come alive every night, and rather than keep the museum safe from the world outside, his job is to keep the world outside safe from the dinosaurs inside.

A re-release was later brought to the American Museum of Natural History with a "now a major motion picture" sticker on it. This version changes Hector's name to Larry to resemble the main character of the movie.

=== Release details ===
- Trenc, Milan. (1993) The Night at the Museum. Woodbury, NY: Barron's Educational Series, (ISBN 0812064003)

== Novelization ==
Night at the Museum: The Junior Novelization
- Author: Leslie Goldman
- Language: English
- Genre: Young adult literature
- Publisher: Barron's Educational Series
- Publication date: 2006
- Media type: Paperback
- Pages: 128 pages
- ISBN: 0-7641-3576-7

To accompany the release of the film adaptation, a novelization written by Leslie Goldman was published in 2006.

Goldman's version of the book, Night at the Museum, is an expanded version of Trenc's story. However, in this story every exhibit in the museum comes to life. After Larry tells his son about the strange things he sees at work every night, the son spends a night at the museum and finds out that the stories his father tells him are true.

This version was included on the New York Times Best Seller list in 2007, and was featured in Publishers Weekly, The New York Post and Newsday magazine.

=== Release details ===
- Goldman, Leslie. (2006) Night at the Museum: The Junior Novelization. Woodbury, NY: Barron's Educational Series, (ISBN 0-7641-3576-7).

== See also ==
- Night at the Museum (franchise)
