= Jake Cherry =

American actor (born 1996)

- Born: Jacob Cherry; September 15, 1996 (age 30); New Jersey, U.S.
- Occupation: Actor
- Years active: 2001–present

Jacob Cherry (born September 15, 1996) is an American actor. He is best known for playing the role of Nick Daley in Night at the Museum (2006) and Night at the Museum: Battle of the Smithsonian (2009).

== Early life ==
Cherry was born on September 15, 1996, in New Jersey. He attended Chapman University.

== Career ==
Cherry's film debut was in Friends with Money. He appeared as Nick Daley in Night at the Museum and Night at the Museum: Battle of the Smithsonian, and as Travers McLain in Desperate Housewives. Cherry did not reprise his role as Nick Daley in the third Night at the Museum film installment, with Skyler Gisondo taking over the role. He also appeared on Fox's short-lived series Head Cases. He appeared in an episode of Criminal Minds, as a patient's son in Fox's medical drama House, and in an episode of Fox's crime drama Bones. He appeared on The Sorcerer's Apprentice as 10-year-old David Stutler.

== Filmography ==
=== Film ===
| Year | Title | Role | Notes |
|---|---|---|---|
| 2004 | Kat Plus One | AJ | TV movie |
| 2004 | Miracle Run | Young Stephen | TV movie |
| 2006 | Night at the Museum | Nicholas "Nick" Daley | |
| 2006 | Friends with Money | Wyatt | |
| 2008 | Pretty/Handsome | Oliver Fitzpayne | TV movie |
| 2009 | Night at the Museum: Battle of the Smithsonian | Nicholas "Nick" Daley | |
| 2009 | The Rebound | Frank Jr. | |
| 2010 | The Sorcerer's Apprentice | Young Dave | |
| 2011 | The Son of No One | Jonathan White | |
| 2012 | Transit | Kenny | |
| 2014 | Hits | Cory | |

=== Television ===
| Year | Title | Role | Notes |
|---|---|---|---|
| 2003-2004 | Blue's Clues | Jack/Goblin | Episode: Adventure! |
| 2004 | Third Watch | Sean | Episode: Black and Blue |
| 2005 | Head Cases | Ryan Payne | 5 episodes |
| 2005 | The Boondocks | Herbert (voice) | Episode: Guess Hoe's Coming to Dinner |
| 2006 | Bones | Donovan Decker | Episode: The Woman in the Car |
| 2007 | Desperate Housewives | Travers McLain | 5 episodes |
| 2007 | The 4400 | Brandon Powell | Episode: Fear Itself |
| 2009 | House | Zack | Episode: Painless |
| 2009 | Criminal Minds | Stanley Wolcott | Episode: The Big Wheel |
| 2011 | The Haunting Hour: The Series | Christopher | Episode: Afraid of Clowns |
| 2015 | Blue Bloods | Victor Bajek | Episode: Payback |

== Nominations ==
| Year | Award | Category | Work | Result |
|---|---|---|---|---|
| 2004 | Young Artist Awards | Best Performance in a Commercial | Vlasic Pickles | Nominated |
| 2007 | Young Artist Awards | Best Performance in a Feature Film – Young Actor Age Ten or Younger | Night at the Museum | Nominated |
| 2008 | Young Artist Awards | Best Performance in a TV Series – Recurring Young Actor | Desperate Housewives | Nominated |
| 2010 | Young Artist Awards | Best Performance in a Feature Film – Supporting Young Actor | Night at the Museum: Battle of the Smithsonian | Nominated |
