= Milan Trenc =

Croatian illustrator and novelist

- Born: 1962 (age 63–64); Zagreb, Croatia
- Education: Zagreb Academy of Dramatic Arts
- Occupations: Illustrator; animator; film director; novelist

Milan Trenc (born 1962) is a Croatian illustrator, animator, film director and novelist.

== Career ==
Born in Zagreb, Trenc first went to the School of Applied Arts, which is a high school, then studied film directing at the Zagreb Academy of Dramatic Arts. While there, he started publishing comics and after graduation he worked at Zagreb Film, where he created The Blentons, an episode in the animated film The Game directed by Krešimir Zimonić. In 1985, Trenc became chief illustrator of Start magazine until 1991. In 1990, he made the animated short The Big Time (Veliki provod) for Zagreb Film, later shown at the London Film Festival, which was particularly well received, becoming a classic in Zagreb Film's repertoire. Throughout this time he was also publishing comics and illustrating the covers of national and international publications. He also wrote and directed Ghost Story, a film for Croatian TV.

Trenc left Start to move to New York City, where he published comic strips in Heavy Metal Magazine and illustrations in publications including The New York Times, Time, The Wall Street Journal, The New Yorker and Fortune. He wrote and illustrated The Night at the Museum, a children's book set in the New York Museum of Natural History and published in 1993 by Barron's Educational Series. The book was produced as a feature film in 2006 and subjected to a novelization by Leslie Goldman. Trenc's sequel, Another Night at the Museum, was released in March 2013. In 2000, Trenc completed his own feature film Zen Stories. Trenc has won awards from Print and the Society of Publication Designers for his illustrations in The New York Times.

== Works ==
- 1993: The Night at the Museum
- 2013: Another Night at the Museum
