= List of accolades received by The Help (film) =

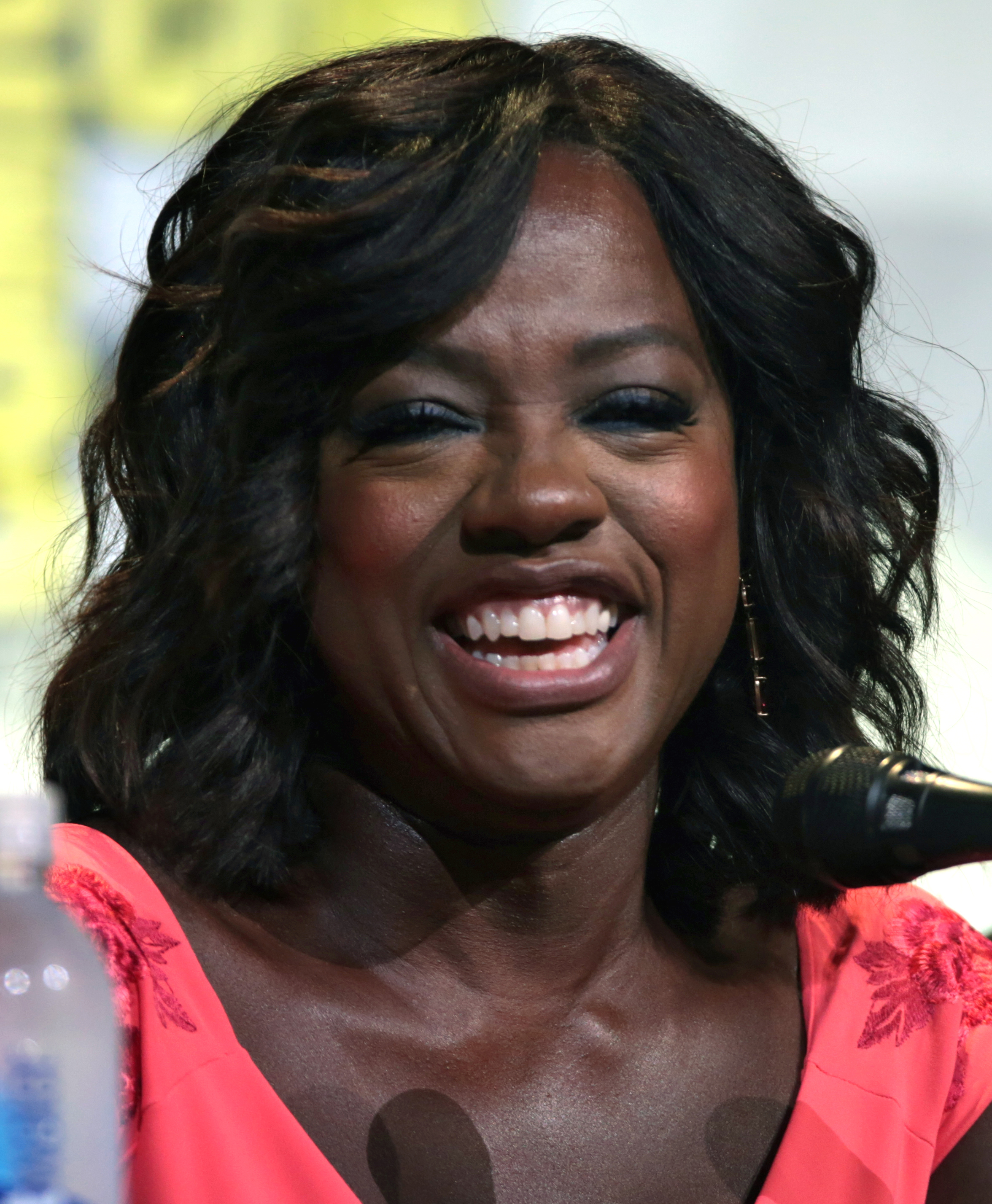
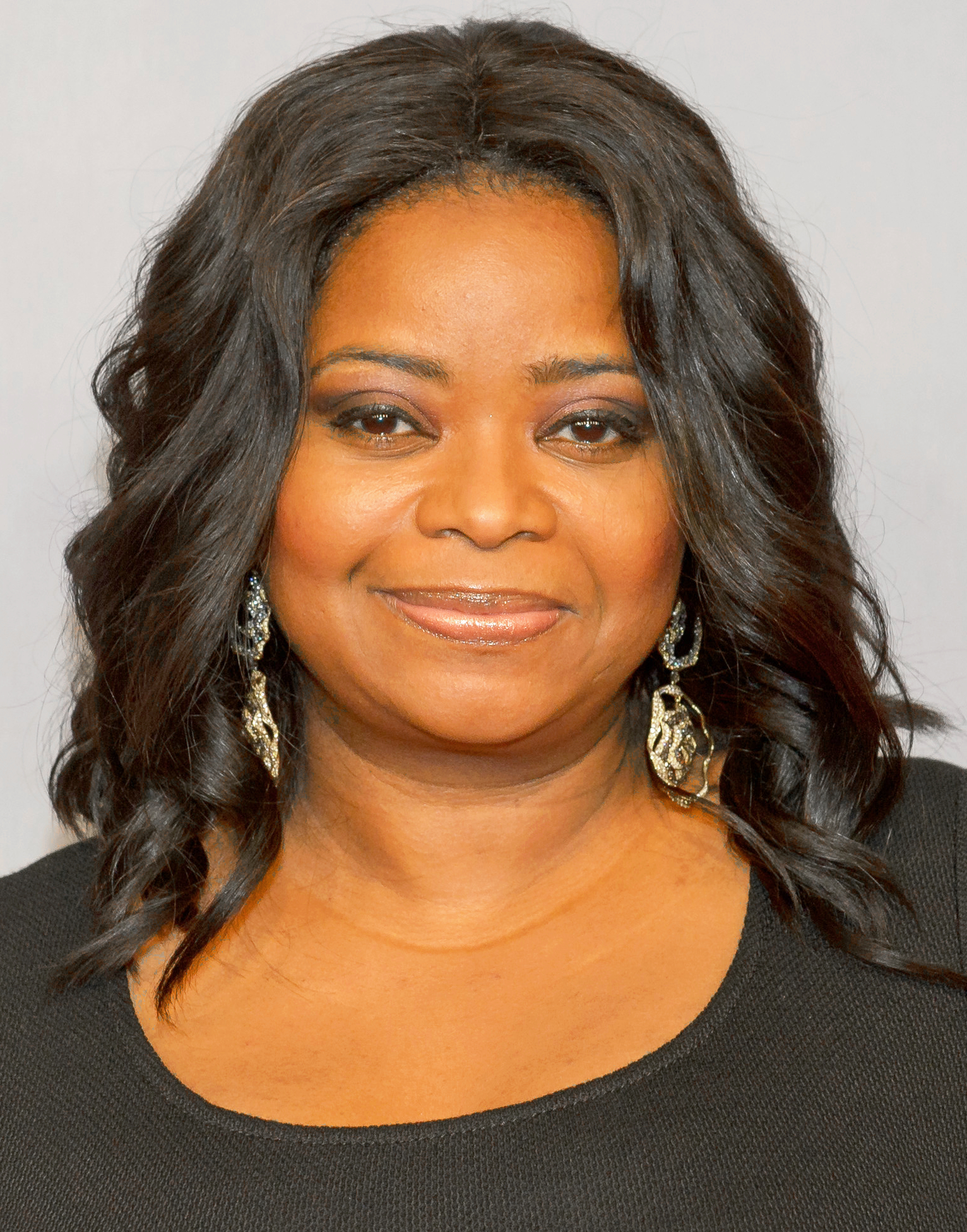
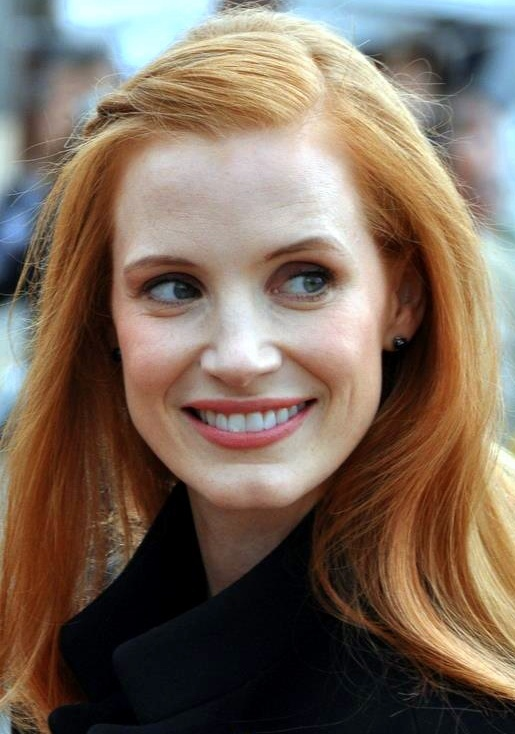
- (from left to right) Viola Davis, Octavia Spencer and Jessica Chastain received acclaim for their performances.
Accolades
Award	Wins	Nominations
Academy Awards	1	4
African American Film Critics Association Awards	2	3
American Film Institute	1	1
Art Directors Guild	0	1
BET Awards	2	2
Black Film Critics Circe	5	5
British Academy Film Awards	1	5
BMI Film & TV Awards	1	1
Broadcast Film Critics Association Awards	3	7
Chicago Film Critics Awards	0	2
Dallas-Fort Worth Film Critics Association	0	1
Detroit Film Critics Society	1	4
Golden Globe Awards	1	4
Hollywood Film Festival	2	2
Houston Film Critics Society	0	5
London Film Critics Circle	2	2
Los Angeles Film Critics Association	1	1
MTV Movie Awards	0	4
National Board of Review of Motion Pictures	1	1
New York Film Critics Circle Awards	1	1
New York Film Critics Online	1	1
Palm Springs International Film Festival	1	1
People's Choice Awards	1	4
Producers Guild of America Awards	0	1
San Diego Film Critics Society	0	3
Satellite Awards	2	6
Screen Actors Guild Awards	3	4
Southeastern Film Critics Association	3	3
St. Louis Gateway Film Critics Association	0	3
Teen Choice Awards	1	3
Vancouver Film Critics Circle	1	1
Washington D.C. Area Film Critics Association Awards	1	4
Women Film Critics Circle	4	5
Writers Guild of America Award	0	1

Totals (Note: Certain award groups do not simply award one winner. They acknowledge several different recipients, have runners-up, and have third place. Since this is a specific recognition and is different from losing an award, runner-up mentions are considered wins in this award tally. For simplification and to avoid errors, each award in this list has been presumed to have had a prior nomination.)
- Wins: 36
- Nominations: 90

The Help is a 2011 American drama directed by Tate Taylor. Featuring an ensemble cast, the film is about a young white woman, Eugenia "Skeeter" Phelan (Emma Stone), and her relationship with two black maids, Aibileen Clark (Viola Davis) and Minny Jackson (Octavia Spencer) during the Civil Rights Movement in the United States. The film is an adaptation of Kathryn Stockett's 2009 novel of the same name. The Help was produced by DreamWorks Studios and distributed by Disney's Touchstone Pictures label.

== Awards and nominations ==
The film was nominated for over 102 awards and won 41 of those awards.

Award	Date	Category	Recipients and nominees	Result
84th Academy Awards	February 26, 2012	Best Picture	Brunson Green, Chris Columbus, Michael Barnathan	Nominated
84th Academy Awards	February 26, 2012	Best Actress	Viola Davis	Nominated
84th Academy Awards	February 26, 2012	Best Supporting Actress	Octavia Spencer	Won
84th Academy Awards	February 26, 2012	Best Supporting Actress	Jessica Chastain	Nominated
African American Film Critics Association Awards	December 12, 2011	Best Picture	The Help	Nominated
African American Film Critics Association Awards	December 12, 2011	Best Actress	Viola Davis	Won
African American Film Critics Association Awards	December 12, 2011	Best Supporting Actress	Octavia Spencer	Won
American Film Institute		Movies of the Year (1 of 10 listed)	The Help	Won
Art Directors Guild	February 4, 2012	Period Film	Mark Ricker (Production Designer)	Nominated
BET Awards	July 1, 2012	Best Movie	The Help	Won
BET Awards	July 1, 2012	Best Actress	Viola Davis	Won
Black Film Critics Circle	December 20, 2011	Best Picture	The Help	Won
Black Film Critics Circle	December 20, 2011	Best Actress	Viola Davis	Won
Black Film Critics Circle	December 20, 2011	Best Supporting Actress	Octavia Spencer	Won
Black Film Critics Circle	December 20, 2011	Best Adapted Screenplay	Tate Taylor	Won
Black Film Critics Circle	December 20, 2011	Best Ensemble	The cast	Won
65th British Academy Film Awards	February 12, 2012	Best Film	Brunson Green, Chris Columbus, Michael Barnathan	Nominated
65th British Academy Film Awards	February 12, 2012	Best Actress	Viola Davis	Nominated
65th British Academy Film Awards	February 12, 2012	Best Supporting Actress	Jessica Chastain	Nominated
65th British Academy Film Awards	February 12, 2012	Best Supporting Actress	Octavia Spencer	Won
65th British Academy Film Awards	February 12, 2012	Best Adapted Screenplay	Tate Taylor	Nominated
BMI Film & TV Awards	May 17, 2012	Film Music Award	Thomas Newman	Won
Broadcast Film Critics Association Awards	January 12, 2012	Best Picture	The Help	Nominated
Broadcast Film Critics Association Awards	January 12, 2012	Best Actress	Viola Davis	Won
Broadcast Film Critics Association Awards	January 12, 2012	Best Supporting Actress	Jessica Chastain	Nominated
Broadcast Film Critics Association Awards	January 12, 2012	Best Supporting Actress	Octavia Spencer	Won
Broadcast Film Critics Association Awards	January 12, 2012	Best Acting Ensemble	The cast	Won
Broadcast Film Critics Association Awards	January 12, 2012	Best Adapted Screenplay	Tate Taylor	Nominated
Broadcast Film Critics Association Awards	January 12, 2012	Best Costume Design	Sharen Davis	Nominated
Broadcast Film Critics Association Awards	January 12, 2012	Best Song	"The Living Proof"	Nominated
Chicago Film Critics Association	December 19, 2011	Best Supporting Actress	Octavia Spencer	Nominated
Chicago Film Critics Association	December 19, 2011	Most Promising Filmmaker	Tate Taylor	Nominated
Dallas-Fort Worth Film Critics Association	December 16, 2011	Best Supporting Actress	Octavia Spencer	Nominated
Detroit Film Critics Society Awards	December 11, 2011	Best Actress	Viola Davis	Nominated
Detroit Film Critics Society Awards	December 11, 2011	Best Supporting Actress	Octavia Spencer	Nominated
Detroit Film Critics Society Awards	December 11, 2011	Best Ensemble	The cast	Nominated
Detroit Film Critics Society Awards	December 11, 2011	Breakthrough Performance	Jessica Chastain (also for Take Shelter and The Tree of Life)	Won
Golden Globe Awards	January 15, 2012	Best Motion Picture – Drama	The Help	Nominated
Golden Globe Awards	January 15, 2012	Best Actress – Motion Picture Drama	Viola Davis	Nominated
Golden Globe Awards	January 15, 2012	Best Supporting Actress – Motion Picture	Jessica Chastain	Nominated
Golden Globe Awards	January 15, 2012	Best Supporting Actress – Motion Picture	Octavia Spencer	Won
Golden Globe Awards	January 15, 2012	Best Original Song	"The Living Proof" (Thomas Newman, Mary J. Blige, Harvey Mason, Jr. and Damon Thomas)	Nominated
Hollywood Film Festival		Ensemble of the Year	The cast	Won
Hollywood Film Festival		Hollywood Breakthrough Award	Jessica Chastain	Won
Houston Film Critics Society Awards	December 13, 2011	Best Picture	The Help	Nominated
Houston Film Critics Society Awards	December 13, 2011	Best Actress	Viola Davis	Nominated
Houston Film Critics Society Awards	December 13, 2011	Best Supporting Actress	Jessica Chastain	Nominated
Houston Film Critics Society Awards	December 13, 2011	Best Supporting Actress	Octavia Spencer	Nominated
Houston Film Critics Society Awards	December 13, 2011	Best Song	"The Living Proof"	Nominated
London Film Critics Circle	January 19, 2012	Best Supporting Actress	Jessica Chastain	Nominated
London Film Critics Circle	January 19, 2012	Best Supporting Actress	Octavia Spencer	Nominated
Los Angeles Film Critics Association	December 11, 2011	Best Supporting Actress	Jessica Chastain (also for Coriolanus, The Debt, Take Shelter, Texas Killing Fields, and The Tree of Life)	Won
Motion Picture Sound Editors	February 19, 2012	Best Sound Editing - Dialogue and ADR for a Feature Film	Dennis Drummond, Kim Drummond, Laura Graham, Scott A. Jennings	Nominated
MTV Movie Awards	June 3, 2012	Movie of the Year	The Help	Nominated
MTV Movie Awards	June 3, 2012	Best Gut-Wrenching Performance	Bryce Dallas Howard	Nominated
MTV Movie Awards	June 3, 2012	Best Cast	The cast	Nominated
MTV Movie Awards	June 3, 2012	Best On-Screen Dirt Bag	Bryce Dallas Howard	Nominated
National Board of Review of Motion Pictures	December 1, 2011	Best Ensemble Cast	The cast	Won
New York Film Critics Circle Awards	November 29, 2011	Best Supporting Actress	Jessica Chastain (also for Take Shelter and The Tree of Life)	Won
New York Film Critics Online	December 11, 2011	Breakthrough Performance	Jessica Chastain (also for The Tree of Life, The Debt, Take Shelter, Texas Killing Fields, and Coriolanus)	Won
Palm Springs International Film Festival	January 7, 2012	Breakthrough Performance Award	Octavia Spencer	Won
People's Choice Awards	January 11, 2012	Favorite Movie Actress	Emma Stone	Won
People's Choice Awards	January 11, 2012	Favorite Movie	The Help	Nominated
People's Choice Awards	January 11, 2012	Favorite Drama Movie	The Help	Nominated
People's Choice Awards	January 11, 2012	Favorite Book Adaptation	The Help	Nominated
Producers Guild of America Award	January 21, 2012	Outstanding Producer of Theatrical Motion Pictures	Michael Barnathan, Chris Columbus, Brunson Green	Nominated
San Diego Film Critics Society Awards	December 14, 2011	Best Actress	Viola Davis	Nominated
San Diego Film Critics Society Awards	December 14, 2011	Best Supporting Actress	Jessica Chastain	Nominated
San Diego Film Critics Society Awards	December 14, 2011	Best Ensemble Performance	The cast	Nominated
Satellite Awards	December 18, 2011	Best Ensemble	The cast	Won
Satellite Awards	December 18, 2011	Best Motion Picture	The Help	Nominated
Satellite Awards	December 18, 2011	Best Actress in a Motion Picture	Viola Davis	Won
Satellite Awards	December 18, 2011	Best Actress in a Supporting Role	Octavia Spencer	Nominated
Satellite Awards	December 18, 2011	Best Director	Tate Taylor	Nominated
Satellite Awards	December 18, 2011	Best Adapted Screenplay	Tate Taylor	Nominated
Screen Actors Guild Awards	January 29, 2012	Outstanding Performance by a Cast in a Motion Picture	The cast	Won
Screen Actors Guild Awards	January 29, 2012	Outstanding Performance by a Female Actor in a Leading Role	Viola Davis	Won
Screen Actors Guild Awards	January 29, 2012	Outstanding Performance by a Female Actor in a Supporting Role	Octavia Spencer	Won
Screen Actors Guild Awards	January 29, 2012	Outstanding Performance by a Female Actor in a Supporting Role	Jessica Chastain	Nominated
Southeastern Film Critics Association Awards		Top Ten Films	The Help	Won
Southeastern Film Critics Association Awards		Best Ensemble	The cast	Won
Southeastern Film Critics Association Awards		The Gene Wyatt Award	The Help	Won
St. Louis Gateway Film Critics Association Awards	December 19, 2011	Best Actress	Viola Davis	Nominated
St. Louis Gateway Film Critics Association Awards	December 19, 2011	Best Supporting Actress	Octavia Spencer	Nominated
St. Louis Gateway Film Critics Association Awards	December 19, 2011	Best Adapted Screenplay	Tate Taylor	Nominated
Teen Choice Awards	July 22, 2012	Choice Movie: Drama	The Help	Nominated
Teen Choice Awards	July 22, 2012	Choice Movie Actress: Drama	Viola Davis	Nominated
Teen Choice Awards	July 22, 2012	Choice Movie Actress: Drama	Emma Stone	Won
Vancouver Film Critics Circle	January 9, 2012	Best Supporting Actress	Jessica Chastain (also for Take Shelter and The Tree of Life)	Won
Washington D.C. Area Film Critics Association Awards	December 5, 2011	Best Actress	Viola Davis	Nominated
Washington D.C. Area Film Critics Association Awards	December 5, 2011	Best Supporting Actress	Octavia Spencer	Won
Washington D.C. Area Film Critics Association Awards	December 5, 2011	Best Adapted Screenplay	Tate Taylor	Nominated
Washington D.C. Area Film Critics Association Awards	December 5, 2011	Best Cast	The cast	Nominated
Women Film Critics Circle	December 19, 2011	Best Movie about Women	The Help	Won
Women Film Critics Circle	December 19, 2011	Best Actress	Viola Davis	Won
Women Film Critics Circle	December 19, 2011	Best Actress	Jessica Chastain (also for The Debt)	Nominated
Women Film Critics Circle	December 19, 2011	Best Ensemble	The cast	Won
Women Film Critics Circle	December 19, 2011	Josephine Baker Award	The Help	Won
Writers Guild of America Awards	February 19, 2012	Adapted Screenplay	Tate Taylor	Nominated
