= Barnes & Noble Book of the Year =

American literary award

- Country: United States
- Presented by: Barnes & Noble
- First award: 2019

The Barnes & Noble Book of the Year Award is an annual literary award presented by Barnes & Noble. It was introduced in 2019. Finalists for the award are chosen by B&N booksellers. As of 2025, there are three categories for winners - Book of the Year, Gift Book of the Year, and Children's Book of the Year.

== Lists ==
| Year | Author | Title | Result |
|---|---|---|---|
| 2019 | Charlie Mackesy | The Boy, the Mole, the Fox and the Horse | Winner |
| 2019 | Margaret Atwood | The Testaments | Finalist |
| 2019 | Fuchsia Dunlop | The Food of Sichuan | Finalist |
| 2019 | Stephen Fry | Mythos | Finalist |
| 2019 | Alex Michaelides | The Silent Patient | Finalist |
| 2019 | Elizabeth Strout | Olive, Again | Finalist |
| 2019 | Greta Thunberg | No One is Too Small to Make a Difference | Finalist |
| 2019 | Colson Whitehead | The Nickel Boys | Finalist |
| 2020 | Aimee Nezhukumatathil | World of Wonders: In Praise of Fireflies, Whale Sharks, and Other Astonishments | Winner |
| 2020 | Wally Koval | Accidentally Wes Anderson | Finalist |
| 2020 | Rumaan Alam | Leave the World Behind | Finalist |
| 2020 | Lauren Ko | Pieometry: Modern Tart Art and Pie Design for the Eye and Palate | Finalist |
| 2020 | Jason Reynolds and Ibram X. Kendi | Stamped: Racism, Antiracism, and You: A Remix of the National Book Award-winning Stamped from the Beginning | Finalist |
| 2020 | Glennon Doyle | Untamed | Finalist |
| 2020 | Brit Bennett | The Vanishing Half | Finalist |
| 2020 | Katherine May | Wintering: The Power of Rest and Retreat in Difficult Times | Finalist |
| 2021 | Paul McCartney | The Lyrics: 1956 to the Present | Winner |
| 2021 | Anthony Doerr | Cloud Cuckoo Land | Finalist |
| 2021 | Louise Erdrich | The Sentence | Finalist |
| 2021 | Anthony Falco | Pizza Czar: Recipes and Know-How from a World-Traveling Pizza Chef | Finalist |
| 2021 | Luke Adam Hawker | Together | Finalist |
| 2021 | T.J. Kune | Under the Whispering Door | Finalist |
| 2021 | Nikole Hannah-Jones and Renée Watson | The 1619 Project: Born on the Water | Finalist |
| 2021 | Michelle Zauner | Crying in H Mart | Finalist |
| 2022 | Bonnie Garmus | Lessons in Chemistry | Winner |
| 2022 | R.F. Kuang | Babel: Or, The Necessity of Violence: An Arcane History of the Oxford Translators’ Revolution | Finalist |
| 2022 | Gabrielle Zevin | Tomorrow, and Tomorrow, and Tomorrow | Finalist |
| 2022 | Maggie O’Farrell | The Marriage Portrait | Finalist |
| 2022 | Mac Barnett and Jon Klassen | The Three Billy Goats Gruff | Finalist |
| 2022 | T. Kingfisher | What Moves the Dead | Finalist |
| 2022 | Vikki Tobak | Ice Cold: A Hip-Hip Jewelry History | Finalist |
| 2022 | Andy Saunders | Apollo Remastered: The Ultimate Photographic Record | Finalist |
| 2022 | Mason Hereford and JJ Goode | Turkey and the Wolf: Flavor Trippin’ in New Orleans | Finalist |
| 2022 | Ed Yong | An Immense World: How Animal Senses Reveal the Hidden World Around Us | Finalist |
| 2022 | A.F. Steadman | Skandar and the Unicorn Thief | Finalist |
| 2023 | James McBride | The Heaven & Earth Grocery Store | Winner |
| 2023 | Kate DiCamillo, illustrated by Julie Morstad | The Puppets of Spelhorst | Finalist |
| 2023 | David Grann | The Wager: A Tale of Shipwreck, Mutiny and Murder | Finalist |
| 2023 | Katy Hessel | The Story of Art Without Men | Finalist |
| 2023 | R.F. Kuang | Yellowface | Finalist |
| 2023 | Bob Odenkirk, Erin Odenkirk (Illustrator) | Zilot & Other Important Rhymes | Finalist |
| 2023 | James Park | Chili Crisp: 50+ Recipes to Satisfy Your Spicy, Crunchy, Garlicky Cravings | Finalist |
| 2023 | Amanda Peters | The Berry Pickers | Finalist |
| 2023 | Rebecca Ross | Divine Rivals | Finalist |
| 2023 | Rick Rubin | The Creative Act: A Way of Being | Finalist |
| 2023 | Jesmyn Ward | Let Us Descend | Finalist |
| 2023 | Rebecca Yarros | Fourth Wing | Finalist |
| 2024 | Percival Everett | James | Winner |
| 2024 | Hanif Abdurraqib | There's Always This Year: On Basketball and Ascension | Finalist |
| 2024 | Essie Chambers | Swift River | Finalist |
| 2024 | Sarah Chapelle | Taylor Swift Style: Fashion Through the Eras | Finalist |
| 2024 | Tom Colicchio | Why I Cook | Finalist |
| 2024 | Luis Elizondo | Imminent: Inside the Pentagon's Hunt for UFOs | Finalist |
| 2024 | Malcolm Gladwell | Revenge of the Tipping Point | Finalist |
| 2024 | Kristin Hannah | The Women | Finalist |
| 2024 | Oliver Jeffers, Sam Winston (illustrator) | The Dictionary Story | Finalist |
| 2024 | Liz Moore | The God of the Woods | Finalist |
| 2024 | Sally Rooney | Intermezzo | Finalist |
| 2024 | Katherine Rundell | Impossible Creatures | Finalist |
| 2024 | Amy Tan | The Backyard Bird Chronicles | Finalist |
| 2025 | Thomas Schlesser | Mona's Eyes | Winner |
| 2025 | Beth Ferry | Growing Home | Children's Book Winner |
| 2025 | Ross Montgomery | I Am Rebel | Children's Book Winner |
| 2025 | Samin Nosrat | Good Things | Gift Book Winner |
| 2025 | Suzanne Collins | Sunrise on the Reaping | Finalist |
| 2025 | S. A. Cosby | King of Ashes | Finalist |
| 2025 | R.F. Kuang | Katabasis | Finalist |
| 2025 | Map Men | This Way Up: When Maps Go Wrong (And Why It Matters) | Finalist |
| 2025 | The New York Times Games | Puzzle Mania! | Finalist |
| 2025 | Mike Rampton | There Are No Silly Questions | Finalist |
| 2025 | Mel Robbins, Sawyer Robbins | The Let Them Theory | Finalist |
| 2025 | Arundhati Roy | Mother Mary Comes to Me | Finalist |
| 2025 | Patrick Ryan | Buckeye | Finalist |
| 2025 | Lucy Steeds | The Artist and the Feast | Finalist |
| 2026 | Mary Beth Keane | Whale Harbor | Winner |
| 2026 | Dan Ojari, Finn Ojari | Is This a Plum? A Peek-Through Picture Book | Children's Gift Book Winner |
| 2026 | Jasmine Warga | The Unlikely Tale of Chase and Finnegan | Children's Book Winner |
| 2026 | Craig Fehrman | This Vast Enterprise: A New History of Lewis & Clark | Non-fiction Winner |
| 2026 | Maggie O'Farrell | Land | Finalist |
| 2026 | Colson Whitehead | Cool Machine | Finalist |
| 2026 | Caro Claire Burke | Yesteryear | Finalist |
| 2026 | Barbara Kingsolver | Partita | Finalist |
| 2026 | Kathryn Stockett | The Calamity Club | Finalist |
| 2026 | Yotam Ottolenghi | Ottolenghi Simple Too: A Cookbook | Finalist |
| 2026 | Robert Macfarlane, Jackie Morris | The Book of Birds: A Field Guide to Wonder and Loss | Finalist |
| 2026 | David Byrne | Sleeping Beauties: Why Good Ideas Go Dormant and How They Wake Up | Finalist |
| 2026 | Belle Burden | Strangers: A Memoir of Marriage | Finalist |
| 2026 | Ben Macintyre | Redwood: The Untold Story of the Cold War's Most Extraordinary Spy | Finalist |
| 2026 | Patrick Radden Keefe | London Falling: A Mysterious Death in a Gilded City and a Family's Search for Truth | Finalist |
| 2026 | Daniel Nayeri | This Is a Door | Finalist |

== See also ==
- Barnes & Noble Discover Prize
- Barnes & Noble Children's & Young Adult Book Awards
