= Brunson Green =

American film producer (born 1967)

- Born: November 1967 (age 58); Jackson, Mississippi, U.S.
- Occupations: Film producer; President of Harbinger Pictures
- Known for: Chicken Party; Pretty Ugly People; The Help
- Spouse: Jason Collins (m. 2025; died 2026)

Brunson Green (born November 28, 1967) is an American film and television producer and president of Harbinger Pictures, a feature film production company based in Los Angeles and Austin, Texas.

== Early life ==
Brunson grew up in Jackson, Mississippi and grew up within a mile of his later collaborator Tate Taylor. He attended Jackson Academy and graduated from Trinity University with a degree in economics.

== Career ==
Green worked for a decade in film and television as a free-lancer while producing a series of short films including Stick Up, Slappy the Clown, Auto Motives, and Chicken Party. His first feature film credited as a producer was the Sundance Film Festival entry, Fool's Gold, which he was credited as co-producer. Green is the producer of the films Pretty Ugly People, A United Kingdom, The Help, and Regretting You. He is the associate producer of the film, Wannabe.

On January 24, 2012, he was nominated for an Academy Award for the movie The Help.

== Personal life ==
Green was in a relationship with former NBA player Jason Collins from June 2014. The pair married in May 2025. Collins died on May 12, 2026 from glioblastoma.

== Filmography ==
=== Film credits ===
| Year | Film | Credit | Notes |
|---|---|---|---|
| 1997 | Stick Up | Producer | Short film |
| 1998 | Fool's Gold | Co-producer | |
| 1999 | Slappy the Clown | Producer | Short film |
| 2000 | Auto Motives | Producer | Short film |
| 2001 | The Journeyman | Producer | |
| 2003 | Chicken Party | Producer | Short film directed by Tate Taylor. |
| 2005 | Wannabe | Associate producer | |
| 2008 | Pretty Ugly People | Producer | Comedy drama film written and directed by Tate Taylor. |
| 2011 | The Help | Producer | Period drama film directed and written by Tate Taylor.; Adapted from Kathryn Stockett's 2009 novel of the same name. |
| 2016 | A United Kingdom | Producer | Period drama film directed by Amma Asante, starring David Oyelowo and Rosamund Pike. |
| 2017 | Walking Out | Producer | Drama based on the short story by the same name, starring Matt Bomer. |
| 2025 | Regretting You | Producer | Romantic drama adaptation of the Colleen Hoover novel of the same name. Directed by Josh Boone, starring Mckenna Grace, Allison Williams, Dave Franco, Mason Thames, Scott Eastwood and Willa Fitzgerald. |

== Awards and nominations ==
| Year | Award | Category | Work | Result | ref |
|---|---|---|---|---|---|
| 2012 | Academy Award | Best Picture | The Help | Nominated | |
| 2012 | BAFTA Award | Best Film | The Help | Nominated | |
| 2012 | Christopher Award | Feature Films | The Help | Won | |
| 2012 | PGA Award | Outstanding Producer of Theatrical Motion Pictures | The Help | Nominated | |
| 2012 | Black Reels Award | Best Film | The Help | Won | |
| 2012 | Gold Derby Award | Motion Picture | The Help | Nominated | |
| 2011 | Awards Circuit Community Award | Best Motion Picture | The Help | Nominated | |
| 2008 | Central Florida Film Festival | Best Feature Film | Pretty Ugly People | Won | |
