= Mary Keane =

Mary Keane may refer to:

- Molly Keane (1904–1996), Irish novelist and playwright
- Mary Beth Keane (born 1977), American writer of Irish parentage
