= List of awards and nominations received by Octavia Spencer =

Octavia Spencer awards and nominations
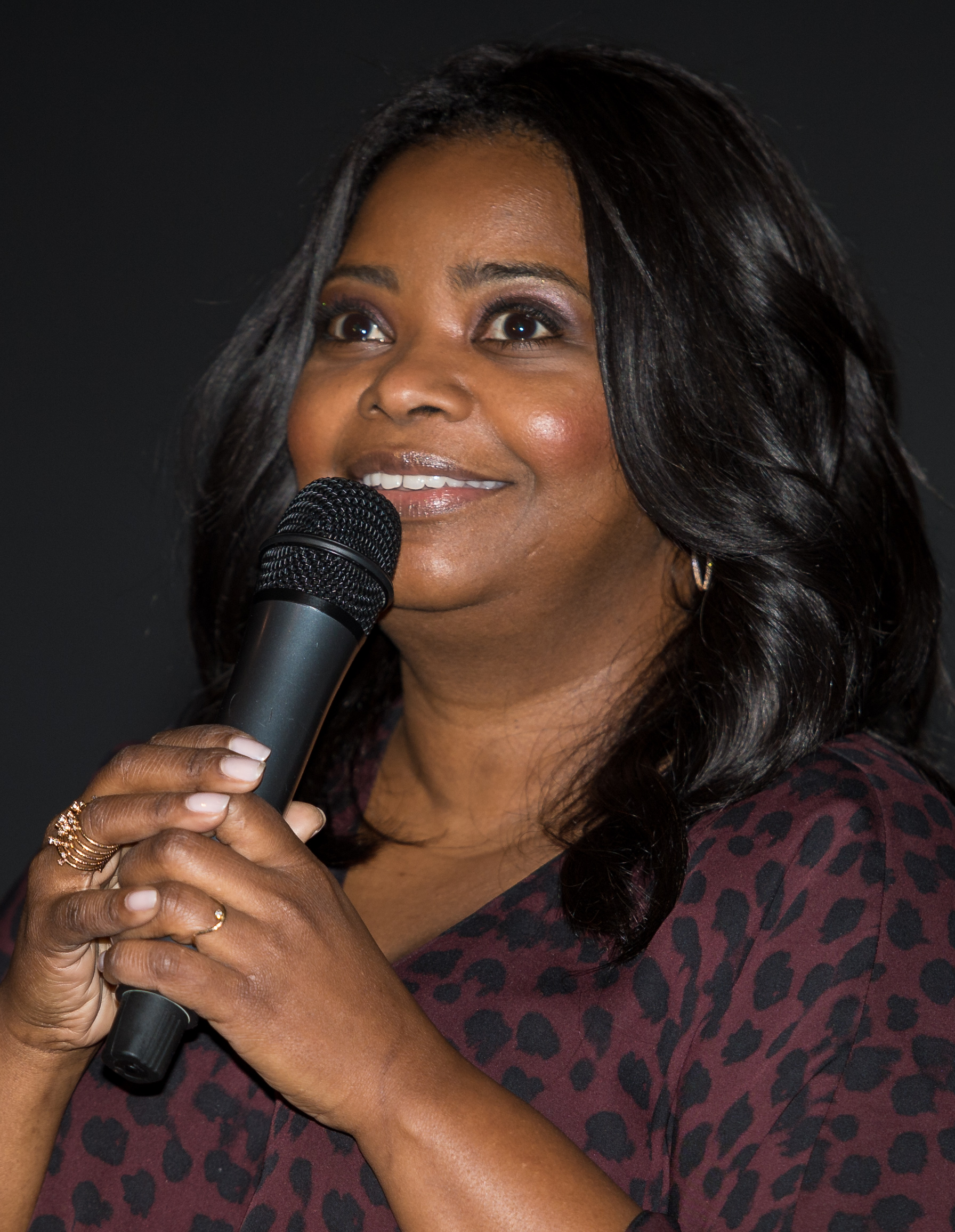
- Spencer at the premiere of Hidden Figures in December 2016
Awards and nominations
Award	Wins	Nominations
Academy Awards	1	3
Actor Awards	3	4
BAFTA Awards	1	2
Golden Globe Awards	1	3
Primetime Emmy Awards	1	3

Totals (Note: Certain award groups do not simply award one winner. They acknowledge several different recipients, have runners-up, and have third place. Since this is a specific recognition and is different from losing an award, runner-up mentions are considered wins in this award tally. For simplification and to avoid errors, each award in this list has been presumed to have had a prior nomination.)
- Wins: 40
- Nominations: 76

This is article is a List of awards and nominations received by Octavia Spencer.

Octavia Spencer is an American actress, author, and producer. She has received several awards including an Academy Award, a BAFTA Award, a Golden Globe Award, and three Actor Awards as well as nominations for two Primetime Emmy Awards.

For her roles on film, she received the Academy Award for Best Supporting Actress for playing Minny Jackson, a maid from the South, in the period drama The Help (2011). The role earned her a BAFTA Award for Best Actress in a Supporting Role, a Golden Globe Award for Best Supporting Actress – Motion Picture and an Actor Award for Outstanding Supporting Actress. She was Oscar-nominated for her playing mathematician Dorothy Vaughan in the drama Hidden Figures (2016), and Zelda Fuller, a custodian in the romantic fantasy film The Shape of Water (2017).

Spencer is the first black actress to receive two consecutive Academy Award nominations in back-to-back years, the first black actress to receive two Academy Award nominations after a win, and the second-most nominated black actress to date behind Viola Davis with four nominations. She was nominated for the Independent Spirit Award for Best Supporting Female for playing a history teacher in the drama Luce (2019). Spencer has also won two Critics' Choice Movie Awards and three National Board of Review Awards as well as the Producers Guild of America Visionary Award in 2020.

For her work in television, she won the Primetime Emmy Award for Outstanding Narrator for the Investigation Discovery documentary series Lost Women of Alaska (2026). She also received a nomination for the Primetime Emmy Award for Outstanding Lead Actress in a Limited or Anthology Series or Movie for her performance as Madam C. J. Walker in the Netflix series Self Made (2020) and the Primetime Emmy Award for Outstanding Narrator for the Investigation Discovery documentary series Lost Women of Highway 20 (2024).

== Major awards ==
=== Academy Awards ===
Year	Category	Nominated work	Result	Ref.
2012	Best Supporting Actress	The Help	Won	
2017	Best Supporting Actress	Hidden Figures	Nominated	
2018	Best Supporting Actress	The Shape of Water	Nominated	

=== Actor Awards ===
Year	Category	Nominated work	Result	Ref.
2012	Outstanding Actress in a Supporting Role	The Help	Won	
2012	Outstanding Cast in a Motion Picture	The Help	Won	
2017	Outstanding Cast in a Motion Picture	Hidden Figures	Won	
2017	Outstanding Actress in a Supporting Role	Hidden Figures	Nominated	

=== BAFTA Awards ===
Year	Category	Nominated work	Result	Ref.
British Academy Film Awards
2012	Best Actress in a Supporting Role	The Help	Won	
2018	Best Actress in a Supporting Role	The Shape of Water	Nominated	

=== Emmy Awards ===
Year	Category	Nominated work	Result	Ref.
Primetime Emmy Awards
2020	Outstanding Lead Actress in a Limited Series or Movie	Self Made	Nominated	
2024	Outstanding Narrator	Lost Women of Highway 20 (for "Vanished")	Nominated	
2026	Outstanding Narrator	Lost Women of Alaska (for "The Missing")	Won	

=== Golden Globe Awards ===
Year	Category	Nominated work	Result	Ref.
2012	Best Supporting Actress – Motion Picture	The Help	Won	
2017	Best Supporting Actress – Motion Picture	Hidden Figures	Nominated	
2018	Best Supporting Actress – Motion Picture	The Shape of Water	Nominated	

== Other awards and nominations ==
Organizations	Year	Category	Work	Result	Ref.
African American Film Critics	2011	Best Supporting Actress	The Help	Won	
African American Film Critics	2014	Best Supporting Actress	Black or White	Won	
African American Film Critics	2014	Best Ensemble	Get on Up	Won	
African American Film Critics	2017	Best Ensemble	Hidden Figures	Won	
Alliance of Women Film Journalists	2011	Best Supporting Actress	The Help	Won	
Alliance of Women Film Journalists	2011	Best Cast	The Help	Nominated	
Alliance of Women Film Journalists	2011	Unforgettable Moment	The Help	Nominated	
Alliance of Women Film Journalists	2016	Best Supporting Actress	Hidden Figures	Nominated	
AACTA Awards	2014	Best International Supporting Actress – Cinema	Fruitvale Station	Nominated	
Award Circuit Community Award	2011	Best Supporting Actress	The Help	Nominated	
Award Circuit Community Award	2011	Best Cast	The Help	Won	
Black Film Critics Circle	2011	Best Supporting Actress	The Help	Won	
Black Film Critics Circle	2011	Best Ensemble	The Help	Won	
Black Film Critics Circle	2011	Breakthrough Performance	The Help	Nominated	
Black Reel Awards	2012	Best Supporting Actress	The Help	Won	
Black Reel Awards	2012	Best Breakthrough Performance	The Help	Nominated	
Black Reel Awards	2013	Best Supporting Actress	Smashed	Nominated	
Black Reel Awards	2013	Best Supporting Actress: Television Movie/Cable	Call Me Crazy: A Five Film	Won	
Black Reel Awards	2014	Best Supporting Actress	Fruitvale Station	Nominated	
Black Reel Awards	2015	Best Supporting Actress	Snowpiercer	Nominated	
Black Reel Awards	2015	Best Ensemble	Get on Up	Nominated	
Black Reel Awards	2017	Best Ensemble	Hidden Figures	Nominated	
Black Reel Awards	2019	Best Supporting Actress	The Shape of Water	Nominated	
Black Reel Awards	2020	Best Supporting Actress	Luce	Nominated	
Black Reel Awards	2021	Outstanding Voice Performance	Onward	Nominated	
Black Reel TV Awards	2020	Outstanding Actress, TV Movie/Limited Series	Self Made	Nominated	
Black Reel TV Awards	2020	Outstanding TV Movie or Limited Series	Self Made	Nominated	
Black Reel TV Awards	2024	Outstanding Lead Performance in a Drama Series	Truth Be Told	Nominated	
Critics' Choice Movie Awards	2012	Best Movie Supporting Actress	The Help	Won	
Critics' Choice Movie Awards	2012	Best Movie Cast	The Help	Won	
Critics' Choice Movie Awards	2016	Best Movie Cast	Hidden Figures	Nominated	
Critics' Choice Movie Awards	2018	Best Movie Supporting Actress	The Shape of Water	Nominated	
Hasty Pudding Theatricals	2017	Woman of the Year	—N/a	Won	
Independent Spirit Award	2019	Best Supporting Female	Luce	Nominated	
NAACP Image Awards	2012	Outstanding Supporting Actress in a Motion Picture	The Help	Won	
NAACP Image Awards	2014	Outstanding Supporting Actress in a Motion Picture	Fruitvale Station	Nominated	
NAACP Image Awards	2015	Outstanding Supporting Actress in a Motion Picture	Get on Up	Nominated	
NAACP Image Awards	2017	Outstanding Supporting Actress in a Motion Picture	Hidden Figures	Nominated	
NAACP Image Awards	2018	Outstanding Actress in a Motion Picture	Gifted	Won	
NAACP Image Awards	2020	Outstanding Supporting Actress in a Motion Picture	Luce	Nominated	
NAACP Image Awards	2020	Outstanding Actress in a Television Movie, Mini-Series or Dramatic Special	Truth Be Told	Nominated	
NAACP Image Awards	2021	Outstanding Television Movie, Mini-Series or Dramatic Special	Self Made	Won	
NAACP Image Awards	2021	Outstanding Actress in a Television Movie, Mini-Series or Dramatic Special	Self Made	Won	
NAACP Image Awards	2022	Outstanding Actress in a Drama Series	Truth Be Told	Nominated	
NAACP Image Awards	2024	Outstanding Actress in a Drama Series	Truth Be Told	Nominated	
National Board of Review	2011	Best Ensemble Cast	The Help	Won	
National Board of Review	2013	Best Supporting Actress	Fruitvale Station	Won	
National Board of Review	2016	Best Ensemble Cast	Hidden Figures	Won	
Producers Guild of America Awards	2020	Visionary Award	—N/a	Won	
Satellite Awards	2011	Best Performance by an Ensemble Cast – Motion Picture	The Help	Won	
Satellite Awards	2011	Best Performance by a Supporting Actress in a Motion Picture – Drama	The Help	Nominated	
Satellite Awards	2017	Best Performance by an Ensemble Cast – Motion Picture	Hidden Figures	Won	
Satellite Awards	2017	Best Performance by a Supporting Actress in a Motion Picture – Drama	Hidden Figures	Nominated	
Saturn Awards	2018	Best Film Supporting Actress	The Shape of Water	Nominated	
Saturn Awards	2019	Best Film Lead Actress	Ma	Nominated	

== Critics awards ==
Organizations	Year	Category	Work	Result	Ref.
African-American Film Critics Association	2017	Best Ensemble	Hidden Figures	Won	
Austin Film Critics Association	2018	Best Supporting Actress	The Shape of Water	Nominated	
Chicago Film Critics Association Awards	2011	The Help	Best Supporting Actress	Nominated	
Chicago Film Critics Association Awards	2020	Luce	Best Supporting Actress	Nominated	
Dallas-Fort Worth Film Critics Association Awards	2011	Best Supporting Actress	The Help	Nominated	
Dallas-Fort Worth Film Critics Association Awards	2017	Best Supporting Actress	The Shape of Water	Nominated	
Denver Film Critics Society	2013	Best Supporting Actress	Fruitvale Station	Nominated	
Denver Film Critics Society	2016	Best Supporting Actress	Hidden Figures	Nominated	
Detroit Film Critics Society Awards	2011	Best Supporting Actress	The Help	Nominated	
Detroit Film Critics Society Awards	2011	Best Ensemble	The Help	Nominated	
Florida Film Critics Circle Awards	2016	Best Supporting Actress	Hidden Figures	Nominated	
Florida Film Critics Circle Awards	2017	Best Cast	The Shape of Water	Nominated	
Hawaii Film Critics Society	2016	Best Supporting Actress	Hidden Figures	Nominated	
Hawaii Film Critics Society	2018	Best Supporting Actress	The Shape of Water	Nominated	
Hollywood Film Festival	2011	Best Ensemble	The Help	Won	
Houston Film Critics Society	2011	Best Supporting Actress	The Help	Nominated	
Houston Film Critics Society	2013	Best Supporting Actress	Fruitvale Station	Nominated	
Houston Film Critics Society	2016	Best Supporting Actress	Hidden Figures	Nominated	
Houston Film Critics Society	2017	Best Supporting Actress	The Shape of Water	Nominated	
Las Vegas Film Critics Society Award	2011	Best Supporting Actress	The Help	Nominated	
Las Vegas Film Critics Society Award	2016	Best Supporting Actress	Hidden Figures	Nominated	
Las Vegas Film Critics Society Award	2016	Best Ensemble	Hidden Figures	Won	
London Film Critics Circle Awards	2011	Best Supporting Actress	The Help	Nominated	
Los Angeles Online Film Critics Society	2017	Best Supporting Actress	The Shape of Water	Nominated	
MTV Movie & TV Awards	2011	Best On-Screen Duo	The Help	Nominated	
North Texas Film Critics Association Awards	2011	Best Supporting Actress	The Help	Won	
North Texas Film Critics Association Awards	2016	Best Supporting Actress	Hidden Figures	Nominated	
North Texas Film Critics Association Awards	2017	Best Supporting Actress	The Shape of Water	Nominated	
Oklahoma Film Critics Circle Awards	2011	Best Supporting Actress	The Help	Won	
Online Film & Television Association Awards	2016	Best Supporting Actress	Hidden Figures	Nominated	
Online Film Critics Society Awards	2016	Best Supporting Actress	Hidden Figures	Nominated	
Online Film Critics Society Awards	2017	Best Ensemble	The Shape of Water	Nominated	
Palm Springs International Film Festival	2011	Breakthrough Performance	The Help	Won	
Palm Springs International Film Festival	2016	Ensemble Performance	Hidden Figures	Won	
Phoenix Critics Circle Award	2017	Best Supporting Actress	The Shape of Water	Nominated	
Phoenix Film Critics Society Award	2011	Best Supporting Actress	The Help	Nominated	
San Diego Film Critics Society Awards	2011	Best Ensemble Performance	The Help	Nominated	
San Diego Film Critics Society Awards	2016	Best Ensemble Performance	Hidden Figures	Won	
San Diego Film Critics Society Awards	2020	Best Supporting Actress	Luce	Nominated	
San Francisco Film Critics Circle Awards	2013	Best Supporting Actress	Fruitvale Station	Nominated	
Southeastern Film Critics Association Awards	2011	Best Ensemble	The Help	Won	
St. Louis Gateway Film Critics Association	2011	Best Supporting Actress	The Help	Nominated	
St. Louis Gateway Film Critics Association	2017	Best Supporting Actress	The Shape of Water	Nominated	
Washington D.C. Area Film Critics Association Awards	2011	Best Supporting Actress	The Help	Won	
Washington D.C. Area Film Critics Association Awards	2011	Best Ensemble	The Help	Nominated	
Washington D.C. Area Film Critics Association Awards	2013	Best Ensemble	Fruitvale Station	Nominated	
Washington D.C. Area Film Critics Association Awards	2013	Best Supporting Actress	Fruitvale Station	Nominated	
Women Film Critics Circle Awards	2011	Best Ensemble	The Help	Nominated	
Women Film Critics Circle Awards	2016	Best Ensemble	Hidden Figures	Won	
