= Chicken Party =

2003 American short film

- Directed by: Tate Taylor
- Written by: Tate Taylor
- Produced by: Brunson Green; Will Roberts; Steven Rogers; Tate Taylor
- Cinematography: Al Satterwhite
- Edited by: David Kirchner
- Music by: Peter Adams; Tony Morales
- Production company: Harbinger Pictures
- Release date: October 14, 2003
- Running time: 29 minutes
- Country: United States
- Language: English

Chicken Party is a 2003 short film directed by Tate Taylor.

== Cast ==
- Octavia Spencer as Laqueta Mills
- Allison Janney as Barbara Strasser
- Tate Taylor as Luke Smith
- Melissa McCarthy as Tot Wagner
- John Wesley as Clarence
- Grady Lee Richmond as Wayne
- Alex Désert as Durell Mills

== Production ==
Chicken Party was filmed in Los Angeles, California.

== Reception ==
Chicken Party won five awards:

- Jackson Crossroads Film Festival (2004) -in Best Short nomination
- Palm Beach International Film Festival (2004) – Best Short
- Palm Springs International ShortFest (2004) – Best Live Action
- Sarasota Film Festival (2004) – Best Short
- WorldFest Houston (2004) – Independent Short Subject-Films & Video – Comedy-Original.
