= Pretty Ugly People =

2008 film by Tate Taylor

- Theatrical release poster
- Directed by: Tate Taylor
- Written by: Tate Taylor
- Produced by: Brunson Green
- Starring: Missi Pyle; Melissa McCarthy; Larry Sulivan; Phill Lewis; Josh Hopkins; Jack Noseworthy; Octavia Spencer; Philip Littell; William Sanderson; Allison Janney
- Cinematography: J.P. Lipa
- Edited by: Justin C. Green
- Music by: Lucian Piane
- Production companies: Harbinger Pictures; Plump Pictures
- Distributed by: Gravitas Ventures
- Release date: April 12, 2008
- Running time: 99 minutes
- Country: United States
- Language: English

Pretty Ugly People is a 2008 American black comedy-drama film written and directed by Tate Taylor, in his feature film directorial debut. It was filmed in Montana.

The film is the story of a group of childhood friends brought back together by one of their number, Lucy (played by Missi Pyle), who planned a surprise four-day hike in the Montana wilderness to celebrate losing hundreds of pounds of weight after gastric bypass surgery. However, Lucy quickly realizes while she has become thin and happy, her friends, played by Melissa McCarthy, Larry Sullivan, Phill Lewis, Josh Hopkins, Jack Noseworthy, Octavia Spencer, and Philip Littell, are miserable.

== Plot ==
The film begins with a voice-over by Lucy (Missi Pyle) discussing what it's like being fat, and having skinny friends in college. She calls her friend Becky (Melissa McCarthy), crying and insinuating she is dying. She asks Becky to rally all of the women's college friends for one final trip to see Lucy, who now helps run Holland Lake Lodge in Condon, Montana.

Orchestrated by Becky, the circle of friends meet up in an airport in Montana. Becky brings her husband Richard and introduces him, for the first time, to commodities trader George, Grammy nominated rap producer Trevor, flight attendant Austin, and State Representative Raye who also brings his wife, Mary (Octavia Spencer). When the group is assembled a man named Sam approaches the group and tells them Lucy has sent him to drive them to the lodge where she is staying.

After arriving at the lodge, the group is greeted by an attractive blonde woman. When no one recognizes her, Lucy reveals to her friends that it is her, no longer fat. Later at lunch, Lucy explains to her friends that she has had gastric bypass surgery and she remains four pounds away from her ideal weight.

Waking the group early the next morning, she informs them that they are going on a four-day hike in which she will drop her final four pounds of weight. The majority of the film centers on the hiking trip. Over the course of the trip, various aspects of the lives of all of Lucy's friends are revealed. George reveals himself as gay. Raye and Mary are unhappy together and Mary ends up taking off her wedding ring and ending her marriage to Raye. Similarly, Becky and Richard are unhappy in their marriage, and it is revealed that Becky is having an affair with a co-worker.

At the end of the hike, Lucy prepares dinner for them before Sam comes to pick everyone up in the bus. Everyone is angry with Lucy, especially Becky, who convinced everyone else to come after Lucy called her. Lucy tells them she believed that becoming thin would make her as happy as them, but what she has realized on the trip is that none of them are happy, and that it never had anything to do with weight.

As Sam is driving the group back to the lodge, he has a heart attack and the bus goes off the road. Sam is dead and Richard dies while waiting for help. Richard apologizes to Becky for the way he treated her just before he dies. Everyone else survives, after Raye runs to get help, also proving to Mary that he cares about others more than himself. Raye goes back to Washington and wins a Senate election. In the final scenes of the movie, everyone (except for Raye) is having lunch on a beach, an inestimable time after the bus accident. Lucy and Becky, who is pregnant, wade into the water so that Becky can toss Richard's ashes to sea. Afterwards, they hug.

== Cast ==
- Missi Pyle as Lucy, a former obese woman who reunites her childhood friends to celebrate her gastric bypass surgery
- Melissa McCarthy as Becky, Lucy's best childhood friend who is now overweight
- Larry Sullivan as Austin, a flight attendant and one of Lucy's childhood friends
- Phill Lewis as Raye, a State Representative and one of Lucy's childhood friends
- Josh Hopkins as George, a commodities trader and one of Lucy's childhood friends
- Jack Noseworthy as Trevor, the successful Grammy Award-nominated producer of the rap band Motherfucking 3 and one of Lucy's childhood friends
- Octavia Spencer as Mary, Raye's wife
- Philip Littell as Richard, Becky's husband
- William Sanderson as Sam, the driver of Lucy's bus
- Allison Janney as Suzanne, an airplane passenger
- Ben Falcone as Coach Merryweather
- Tate Taylor as George's boyfriend

== Reception ==
The film has a user rating of 5.0 due to mixed critic reviews on IMDb.

== Awards ==
The film seems largely ignored by critics, however, it did well on the independent film circuit. It was the winner of "Best Feature Film" at the Berks Madness film festival. It took the same award at both the Berkley and Long Island film festivals. Also, it won an "audience choice" award at the Crossroads film festival.
