= The Calamity Club =

Novel by Kathryn Stockett

- Author: Kathryn Stockett
- Language: English
- Genre: Historical fiction
- Publisher: Spiegel & Grau
- Publication date: May 5, 2026
- Publication place: United States
- Media type: Print (hardcover)
- Pages: 656
- ISBN: 978-1-954118-81-2

The Calamity Club is a historical fiction novel by American author Kathryn Stockett, published by Spiegel & Grau on May 5, 2026. It is Stockett's second novel, appearing seventeen years after her debut The Help (2009). Set in Oxford, Mississippi in 1933 during the Great Depression, the book follows two women and a girl — an orphaned girl, an unmarried bookkeeper, and a resourceful down-on-her-luck woman — whose lives converge amid the poverty, hypocrisy, and constrained freedoms of the Depression-era Deep South. It reached the top of the New York Times bestseller list on publication.

The New York Times described it as "a heart-wrenching, often hilarious story of economic hardship, moral posturing, and the particular yearnings of childless women and motherless girls." Oprah Daily called it "so immersive, exciting, and downright fabulous, you never want it to end." The audiobook edition is narrated by Jenna Lamia and January LaVoy.

== Plot Summary ==
Set in Oxford, Mississippi in 1933, The Calamity Club is narrated alternately by two characters. Eleven-year-old Meg Lefleur has been living for two years at the Lafayette County Orphan Asylum (known locally as "the Orphan") after being abandoned by her mother on Christmas Eve. Meg is one of the older, ostensibly "unadoptable" girls, targeted for further stigmatisation by the asylum's domineering chairlady, Garnett, who labels them offspring of "feebleminded" mothers. Meg refuses to believe her mother's disappearance was deliberate and fights each day to keep her spirit intact.

Birdie Calhoun is an unmarried, outspoken bookkeeper who travels to Oxford to ask her socialite sister Frances for financial help for their struggling family. Frances, who has married a wealthy banker, is unwilling to be reminded of her humble origins. When Birdie discovers that her sister's seemingly charmed life is built on lies, she is drawn into the community. Because the Orphan's accounts must be audited before a state inspector arrives, and Birdie is a bookkeeper, Frances arranges for Birdie to take on the work, bringing her into contact with Meg.

Their fates converge with those of Charlie, a woman running out of luck and options, who proposes a bold and audacious plan for the three of them to take control of their lives. In the face of a society where women's freedom is fragile and hypocrisy pervades every social institution, even small acts of defiance carry dangerous consequences. Stockett weaves multiple storylines — touching on the eugenics movement, forced sterilization, poverty, sex work, adoption, and Prohibition — before uniting her characters in an ending described by reviewers as "cozy and satisfying."

== Background and Writing ==
Stockett first began working on a novel set in Depression-era Mississippi in 2013, following the extraordinary reception of The Help. She conducted extensive research into the era, including the Farm Act, child labor laws, the eugenics movement, the forced sterilization of women in prison, and the policies of Franklin D. Roosevelt's administration.

By 2020, having written some 800 pages, Stockett felt stuck and nearly abandoned the project. "I wrote this thing for so long," she later said. "I felt like everything I touched was failing." A friend who had read the manuscript connected her with Julie Grau, co-founder of Spiegel & Grau. Stockett and Grau worked together for years without a contract before eventually signing a publishing deal. Her original publisher had canceled her contract; she later described this in an interview as having been "fired." She wrote portions of the novel while living in Bali.

The novel was announced publicly by The New York Times in March 2025 and published on May 5, 2026, seventeen years after The Help. Upon publication, The New York Times named it an Editor's Choice and it was cited as one of the most anticipated books of 2026 by outlets including The New York Times, Oprah Daily, Goodreads, Garden & Gun, Southern Living, and Town & Country.

== Reception ==
The Calamity Club received broadly positive reviews. Kirkus Reviews, which awarded it a "Get It" verdict and noted its status as a New York Times bestseller, described it as a "compulsively readable yarn" that "should make a great miniseries", concluding: "Fans of Stockett's bestselling debut will love this engaging follow-up." The New York Times Book Review wrote that "action is carried relentlessly forward on the surf of Stockett's full-hearted, down-to-earth prose, her dialogue and inner monologues so well crafted that each sentence gives the impression of being not crafted at all, but inevitable", and called it "pure, hell-raising entertainment."

Publishers Weekly wrote: "Stockett's vibrant follow-up to her bestselling 2009 novel, The Help, traces the intersecting lives of an exasperated older sister, a precocious orphan, and an enterprising woman in 1933 Mississippi. . . . By turns hilarious and heartbreaking, this offers a memorable view into the impossible choices faced by women in the Great Depression." Booklist noted: "The enormous success of The Help as a novel and as the source for the Academy Award–winning film has left readers longing for Stockett's second novel. . . . As she did in The Help, Stockett again satirizes the hypocrisy underpinning much of the early-twentieth-century South in a saga populated with memorable characters who rely on stock-in-trade pluck and sass to right all wrongs."

The Sunday Times (UK) called it "a rip-roaring adventure of found family, complex sisterhood, tested moral compasses and capable women making the best . . . out of truly awful circumstances", adding: "Stockett is a born storyteller." The Christian Science Monitor described it as "a labyrinthine story of savvy and gall with an irresistible pull."

Some critics offered more qualified assessments. The New York Times review noted that the novel is "narrated exclusively by white women", drawing a contrast to The Help, and observed that while Stockett "is a master of the set piece", the long narrative "keeps piling on more dramatic developments until all loose ends are neatly, if hastily, wrapped up in the final pages." A review in Dear, Strange Things suggested the novel "reads like two different books stuffed into one", though it acknowledged that Stockett "writes less about race and more about poverty, and you could make a strong case that she understands poverty better" than in her debut.

The audiobook edition received particular praise. A review at Please Read It to Me wrote: "All told, 'The Calamity Club' is a better novel than the one that made Stockett famous, and it deserves to be treated that way", praising narrators Jenna Lamia and January LaVoy as "exceptional."

== Bestseller Chart ==
The Calamity Club debuted as an instant New York Times bestseller upon its publication on May 5, 2026. As of early July 2026, the novel had appeared on The New York Times Best Seller list for seven weeks, at that point ranked at No. 3. As of July 14, 2026, the book also held the number one position on Amazon's most-read book chart.

The novel had been named one of the most anticipated books of 2026 by more than a dozen major publications prior to release, including The New York Times, Oprah Daily, Goodreads, Southern Living, Town & Country, and the New York Post.

== See also ==
- The Help
- Spiegel & Grau
- List of best-selling books
