= Anthony Falco =

American chef and author

Anthony "Pizza Czar" Falco
- Born: July 29, 1979 (age 47); Austin, Texas, US
- Occupations: Chef, Author and Pizza consultant

Anthony “Pizza Czar” Falco (born July 29, 1979) is an American chef, author and pizza consultant.

== Career ==
Born in Austin, Texas, Falco worked at Roberta's in Brooklyn for years. In 2015, he became a pizza consultant. He has consulted on pizza projects in several countries. He is the author of Pizza Czar: Recipes and Know-How from a World-Traveling Pizza Chef.
