= Mary Beth Keane =

American writer of Irish parentage (born 1979)

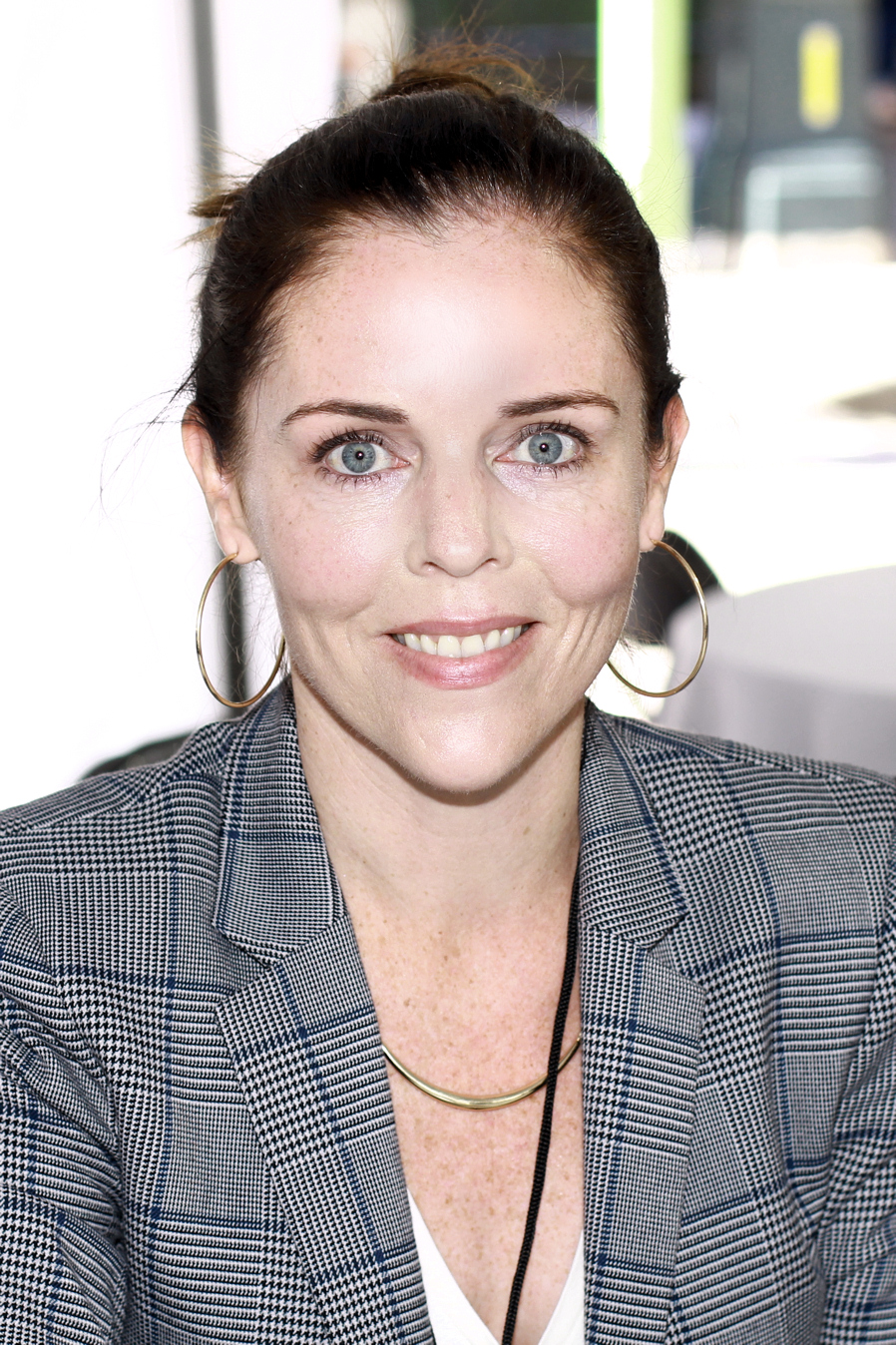
- Keane at the 2019 Texas Book Festival
- Born: July 3, 1977 (age 49); Bronx, New York
- Education: Barnard College (BA); University of Virginia (MFA)
- Spouse: Martin Hickey
- Writing career
- Period: 2009–present
- Notable work: Ask Again, Yes (2019)
- Website: web.archive.org/web/20190726062855/http://www.marybethkeane.com/

Mary Beth Keane is an American writer. She is the author of The Walking People (2009), Fever (2013), Ask Again, Yes (2019), and The Half Moon (2023). In 2011 she was named one of the National Book Foundation's 5 Under 35, and in 2015 she was awarded a Guggenheim Fellowship for Fiction.

== Early life and education ==
Born in the Bronx, New York City, to Irish parentage she was raised in Pearl River, New York with her sisters. Keane attended Immaculate Heart Academy in Washington Township, New Jersey.

Keane graduated from Barnard College with a B.A. in English Literature in 1999. She later attended the University of Virginia, where she earned her M.F.A. in Fiction in 2005.

== Career ==
In 2001, Keane was hired as a receptionist at a New York literary agency, where she met her agent.

Her writing has appeared in The New York Times, The Chicago Tribune, Vogue, The Daily Beast, The Antioch Review, New York Stories, The Recorder, and The Baltimore Review.

Keane's first novel, The Walking People, published in 2009, chronicles the life of two sisters who leave their small Irish village for New York.

Her second novel, Fever, a fictional retelling of the life of Typhoid Mary, was listed as one of the New York Times Editor's Choice novels in March 2013.

Her third novel, Ask Again, Yes debuted at No. 5 on The New York Times Best Sellers list in June 2019. Additionally, in 2019 Keane won the Tonight Show Summer Reads contest, and in August she appeared on The Tonight Show with Jimmy Fallon to discuss the book.

== Influences ==
Keane has named William Trevor, Seamus Heaney, Alice Munro, Margaret Atwood, and Elizabeth Strout among the authors who have influenced her writing. She has said her Irish heritage influences the characters she chooses to write.

== Awards ==
In 2010, The Walking People was a runner-up for the Pen/Hemingway award. Ask Again, Yes was selected as The Tonight Show Summer Reads choice for 2019 after five days of audience voting that garnered nearly a million votes. Keane won the NAIBA 2019 Award for Best Fiction, and she was a finalist for the 2019 Goodread's Choice Award Best Fiction. In 2026, Whale Harbor was named the Barnes & Noble Book of the Year.

== Works ==
- The Walking People (2009)
- Fever (2013)
- Ask Again, Yes (2019)
- The Half Moon (2023)
- Whale Harbor (2026)

== Personal life ==
Raised Catholic, Keane wrote an essay for Vogue Magazine in 2018, about her decision to leave the Catholic Church.

Keane lives outside New York City with her husband and their two sons, Owen and Emmett.
