= Katherine May =

British author and podcaster (born 1977)

Katherine May (born 18 September 1977), also writing as Katie May and Betty Herbert, is a British author and podcaster. Her writing includes memoirs (Wintering, Enchantment and The Electricity of Every Living Thing), novels, and journalism.

== Career ==
After graduating, May worked for arts organisations including Tate Britain and Creative Partnerships. She later worked as a literary scout for Lucy Abrahams Literary Scouting, and for Faber Academy as a manuscript assessor. She was the Programme Director for the Creative Writing BA and MA at Canterbury Christ Church University from 2013 until 2018. She became a full-time writer in 2021 and that year launched a podcast series called The Wintering Sessions, followed by a podcast series called How We Live Now.

She has written three memoirs. The Electricity of Every Living Thing: A Woman's Walk in the Wild to Find Her Way Home describes walking the South West Coast Path and the North Downs Way and recognising that she is autistic after hearing a radio programme about autism. In Wintering: The Power of Rest and Retreat in Difficult Times she discusses coping with difficulties in life, after her husband became critically ill. In Enchantment: Reawakening Wonder in an Exhausted Age, she "begins to explore the restorative properties of the natural world" after the COVID-19 pandemic. Both Wintering and Enchantment were The New York Times and The Sunday Times bestsellers. Wintering was a BBC Radio 4 Book of the Week. She used the pseudonym Betty Herbert to write 52 Seductions, a memoir about sex in a long-term relationship, and an associated blog, but "came out" with her real name after it was published.

She has written essays and journalism for publications including The New York Times, The i paper, The Guardian and Aeon.

Her 2018 novel The Whitstable High Tide Swimming Club, written under the name of Katie May, is set in her home town of Whitstable in Kent, and has been described as "a fun and ultimately uplifting story that promises hope for the future and the gift of second chances" and as a book which "will reinforce for you the importance of friendship, of solidarity against the vicissitudes that life can throw and of standing up for what you truly believe in; be it your right to live without fear, to choose how to manage illness and old age or even just your right to swim in the sea".

== Neurodivergence ==
May has written about being neurodivergent in her books as well as in essays and journalism. She wrote an account of having face blindness for The Guardian newspaper: "I didn't always know I was face-blind. I grew up thinking that I just didn't remember people."

Her book The Electricity of Every Living Thing described her realisation that she is autistic, and the process of being diagnosed. "People like me can live entire lives wondering why everything is so hard for us. Doctors, teachers and mental health professionals are still routinely unable to spot our autism, and their knowledge is often agonisingly out of date. The invisibility endures." She wrote about her experience of realising she was autistic as an adult in the i paper: "This new self-knowledge is complex and imprecise. It can be hard to unpick a lifetime of concealing your autism."

She has compiled a collection of "Autism Resources" to help people with a diagnosis of autism or who think that they may be autistic.

== Awards and achievements ==
The Electricity of Every Living Thing was adapted as an audio drama by Julie Parsons and Caitriona Shoobridge for Audible. Described as "An immersive audio drama based on the original memoir", it won silver in the "fiction" section at the British Podcast Awards in 2023.

Wintering won the Porchlight Business Book Awards personal development and human behaviour category 2020, and was long-listed for the 2020 Wainwright Prize for UK nature writing.

== Personal life ==
May lives in Whitstable, Kent, with her husband and son.

== Selected publications ==
=== Works of non-fiction ===
- The Electricity of Every Living Thing: A Woman's Walk in the Wild to Find Her Way Home (2018, Trapeze: ISBN 978-1409172512)
- Wintering: The Power of Rest and Retreat in Difficult Times (2020, Rider: ISBN 9781846045998)
- Enchantment: Reawakening Wonder in an Exhausted Age (2023, Faber & Faber: ISBN 9780571378333)

==== Writing as Betty Herbert ====
- The 52 Seductions Paperback (2012, Headline: ISBN 9780755362530)

=== Works as an editor/contributor ===
- (Edited) The Best, Most Awful Job: Twenty Writers Talk Honestly About Motherhood (2021, Elliott & Thompson: ISBN 978-1783964871)

=== Works of fiction ===
- Ghosts & Their Uses (short stories) (2006, Urban Fox: ISBN 978-1905522071)
- Burning Out (2009, Snowbooks: ISBN 978-1906727390)

==== Writing as Katie May ====
- The Whitstable High Tide Swimming Club (2017, Trapeze: ISBN 978-1409172383)

=== Essays ===
- May, Katherine (22 August 2018). "The autistic view of the world is not the neurotypical cliché". Aeon.
