= Tate Taylor (filmmaker) =

American filmmaker and actor (born 1969)

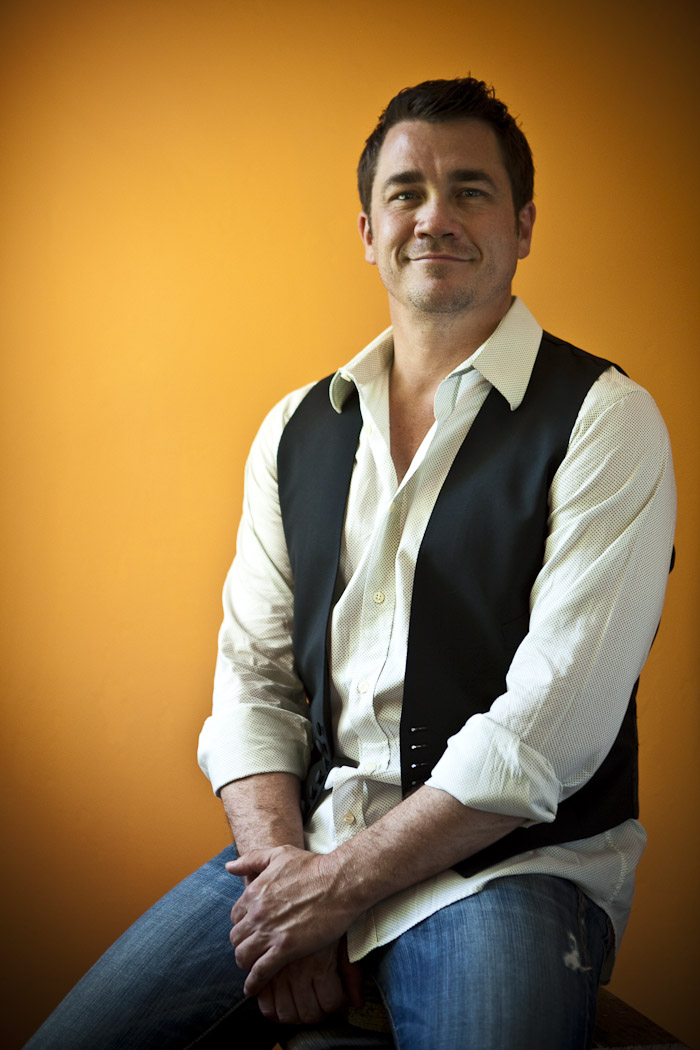
- Taylor in 2011
- Born: June 3, 1969 (age 57); Jackson, Mississippi, U.S.
- Occupations: Film director; film producer; screenwriter; actor

Tate Taylor (born June 3, 1969) is an American filmmaker and actor. Taylor is best known for directing The Help (2011), Get On Up (2014), The Girl on the Train (2016), and Ma (2019).

== Early life ==
Taylor was born on June 3, 1969, in Jackson, Mississippi, where he grew up.

== Career ==
Taylor worked for 15 years in New York City and Los Angeles. Though he debuted as a feature film director in Pretty Ugly People (2008), he was primarily an actor for most of his career, in films such as Romy and Michele's High School Reunion (1997) and Winter's Bone (2010), and on television in series such as Charmed, Six Feet Under, and The Drew Carey Show.

Taylor achieved mainstream success when he directed the film The Help (2011), based on Kathryn Stockett's novel of the same title. Stockett gave him rights to make the film adaptation in June 2008, before the book was published. In addition to receiving generally positive reviews, the film was a major commercial success, earning more than $200 million worldwide, and was nominated for the Academy Award for Best Picture. Tate Taylor has been nominated for and received industry awards including the 2013 Vail Film Festival Vanguard Award, the 2012 BAFTA Award for Best Adapted Screenplay nomination, the 2012 Writers Guild of America Award for Best Adapted Screenplay, the 2012 Critics' Choice Movie Award for Best Adapted Screenplay nomination, the 2012 NAACP Image Award nomination for Outstanding Directing in a Motion Picture and for Outstanding Writing in a Motion Picture, and the 2011 Chicago Film Critics Association nomination. Taylor next directed the James Brown biopic Get On Up (2014), which starred Chadwick Boseman. Though the film was a critical success, it commercially underperformed. His next project The Girl on the Train, an adaptation of the book by Paula Hawkins, was released to mixed reviews from critics, but was a box office success.

In August 2018, Taylor was announced to be directing Jessica Chastain in action thriller film Ava. Taylor replaced original director Matthew Newton, who stepped down after controversy over allegations of domestic violence and assault.

In May 2019, Taylor released psychological horror film Ma, starring frequent collaborator Octavia Spencer. The film, produced by Jason Blum through his Blumhouse Productions banner, was a critical and commercial success. That same month, Fox ordered Taylor's first television project, Filthy Rich, to series. An American adaptation of the New Zealand series starring Kim Cattrall, it premiered in September 2020 and was cancelled after one season.

Taylor's most recent film is Breaking News in Yuba County, starring frequent collaborator Allison Janney, was released on February 12, 2021.

== Personal life ==
Taylor is gay and is in a relationship with producer John Norris. He resides on the Wyolah Plantation, an Antebellum plantation in Church Hill, Mississippi.

== Filmography ==
=== Film ===
Year	Title	Director	Producer	Writer
2003	Chicken Party	Yes	Yes	Yes
2008	Pretty Ugly People	Yes	Yes	Yes
2011	The Help	Yes	Executive	Yes
2014	Get On Up	Yes	Yes	No
2016	The Girl on the Train	Yes	No	No
2019	Ma	Yes	Yes	No
2020	Ava	Yes	No	No
2021	Breaking News in Yuba County	Yes	Yes	No
TBA	Cupid	Yes	Yes	No

Acting credits

Year	Title	Role
1997	Romy and Michele's High School Reunion	Casey Deegan
2001	Planet of the Apes	Friend at Leo's Party
2002	I Spy	Lieutenant Percy
2003	Chicken Party	Luke Smith
2004	Breakin' All the Rules	Attendant
2005	Wannabe	Gunner Dillyn
2008	Pretty Ugly People	George's boyfriend
2010	Winter's Bone	Mike Satterfield
2019	Ma	Officer Grainger
2021	Breaking News in Yuba County	Attractive Customer

=== Television ===
Year	Title	Director	Executive Producer	Writer	Notes
2015	Grace and Frankie	Yes	Yes	No	Episode "Pilot"
2020	Filthy Rich	Yes	Yes	Yes	Developer
2024	Palm Royale	Yes	Yes	No	

Acting credits

Year	Title	Role	Notes
1999	Charmed	Applicant No. 3	Episode "The Painted World"
2001	Six Feet Under	Job Applicant No. 1	Episode "The New Person"
2002	The Drew Carey Show	Jim	Episode "The Dawn Patrol"
2003	A.U.S.A.	Gung-Ho A.U.S.A.	Episode "Pilot"
2005	Queer as Folk	Calvin	Episode "We Will Survive!"
2008	Sordid Lives: The Series	Richie Miller	3 episodes

== Awards and nominations ==
Year	Award	Category	Title	Result
2011	BAFTA Awards	Best Adapted Screenplay	The Help	Nominated
2011	Critics' Choice Movie Awards	Best Adapted Screenplay	The Help	Nominated
2011	Writers Guild of America	Best Adapted Screenplay	The Help	Nominated
