= Octavia Spencer =

American actress (born 1970)

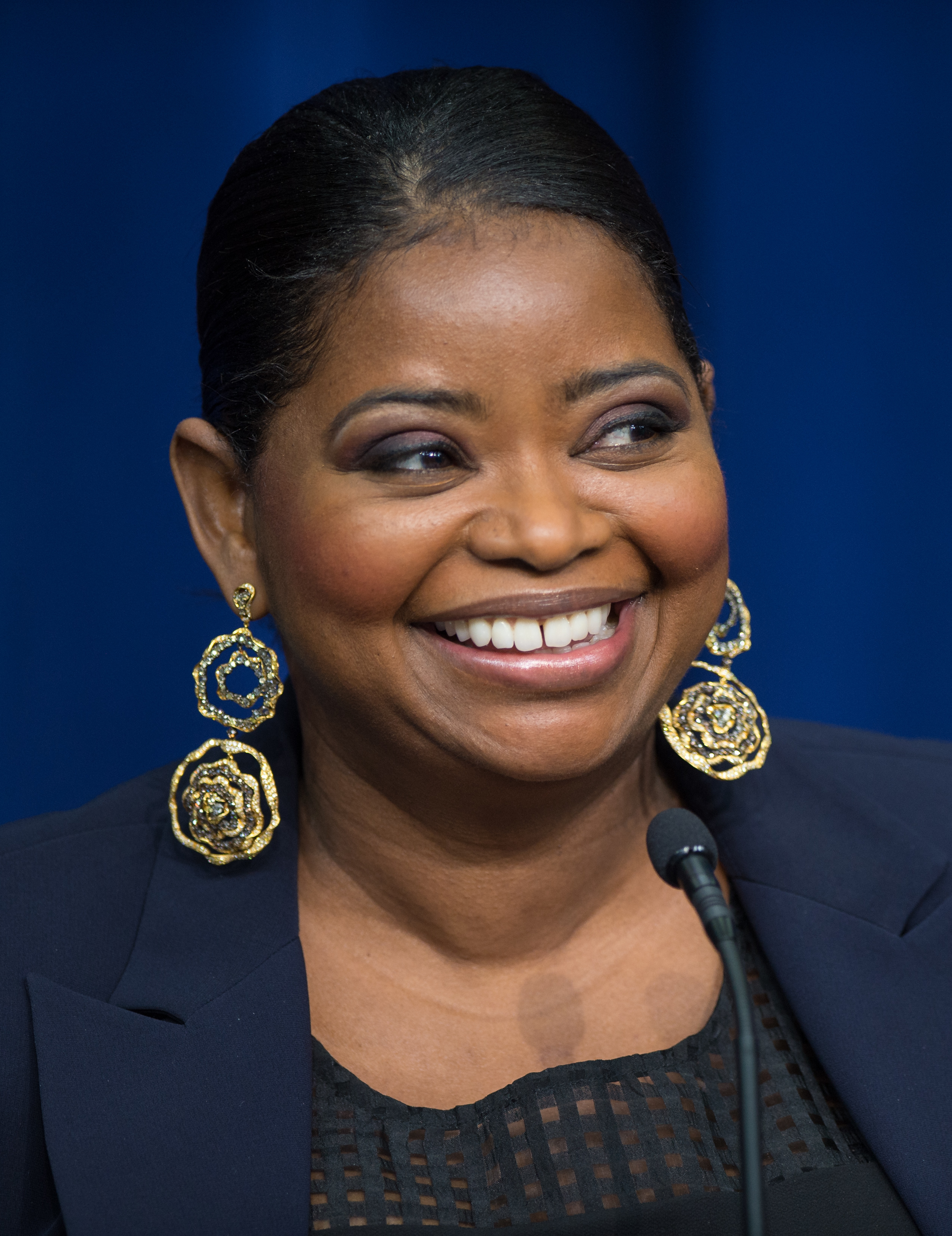
- Spencer at the White House in 2016
- Born: Octavia Lenora Spencer; May 25, 1970 (age 56); Montgomery, Alabama, U.S.
- Education: Auburn University at Montgomery; Auburn University (BA)
- Occupation: Actress
- Years active: 1996–present
- Awards: Full list

Octavia Lenora Spencer (born May 25, 1970) (Note: Spencer previously had given her birth year as 1972, a date disseminated in reference sources. She announced in May 2020 that she actually had turned 50.) is an American actress and author. She is the recipient of various accolades, including an Academy Award, a Primetime Emmy Award, a British Academy Film Award, and a Golden Globe Award.

Spencer made her film debut in the 1996 drama A Time to Kill. Following a decade of brief roles in film and television, her breakthrough came in 2011 when she played a maid in 1960s Mississippi in the drama film The Help, which won her the Academy Award for Best Supporting Actress. In ensuing years, she won the National Board of Review Award for Best Supporting Actress for her role in Ryan Coogler's biopic Fruitvale Station (2013), had a recurring role in the CBS sitcom Mom (2013–2015), and starred in the Fox drama series Red Band Society (2014–2015).

Spencer's roles in 1960s period films—as Dorothy Vaughan in the biopic Hidden Figures (2016) and a cleaning woman in the fantasy The Shape of Water (2017)—earned her two consecutive nominations for the Academy Award for Best Supporting Actress, becoming the first black actress to achieve such a feat. She has since starred in The Divergent Series (2015–16), The Shack (2017), Gifted (2017), Instant Family (2018), Luce (2019), Ma (2019), Onward (2020), and Spirited (2022). She led the Apple TV+ drama series Truth Be Told (2019–2023) and was nominated for the Primetime Emmy Award for Outstanding Lead Actress in a Limited Series or Movie for her portrayal of Madam C. J. Walker in the Netflix miniseries Self Made (2020). She won the Primetime Emmy Award for Outstanding Narrator in 2026 for Lost Women of Alaska.

As an author, Spencer created the children's book series Randi Rhodes, Ninja Detective. She has published two books in the series, titled The Case of the Time-Capsule Bandit (2013) and The Sweetest Heist in History (2015).

== Early life and education ==
Octavia Lenora Spencer was born on May 25, 1970, in Montgomery, Alabama, and has six siblings, including sisters Rosa and Areka Spencer. Her mother, Dellsena Spencer (1945–1988), worked as a maid. Her father died when she was thirteen. Spencer graduated from Jefferson Davis High School in 1988. She studied at Auburn University at Montgomery, and graduated from Auburn University, where she majored in English with a double minor in journalism and theater. Spencer has dyslexia. Spencer worked as an intern on the set of The Long Walk Home, a film starring Whoopi Goldberg.

Since December 2021, Spencer has purchased food for Auburn students during finals week.

== Career ==
=== Early roles ===
In 1996, Spencer made her film debut as a nurse in Joel Schumacher's A Time to Kill, based on the book by John Grisham. She was originally hired to work on casting, but asked Schumacher if she could audition for a part. In 1997, she moved to Los Angeles on the advice of her friend Tate Taylor, the future director of The Help, in which Spencer would later star.

=== 2000s ===
Other film credits include: Never Been Kissed (1999), Big Momma's House (2000), Spider-Man (2002), S.W.A.T. (2003), Bad Santa (2003), Win a Date with Tad Hamilton! (2004), Coach Carter (2005), Miss Congeniality 2 (2005) and Pretty Ugly People (2008). She has made a number of guest appearances on television series, including Raising the Bar, CSI: Crime Scene Investigation, The Big Bang Theory, Wizards of Waverly Place, Grounded for Life, ER, Titus, Becker, 30 Rock and Dharma & Greg, plus a recurring role on the sitcom Mom. She is also known for her starring roles as Serenity Johnson on Comedy Central's Halfway Home, and Constance Grady, the amorous INS caseworker on Ugly Betty.

In 2003, Spencer made her stage debut in Los Angeles, in Del Shores' play, The Trials and Tribulations of a Trailer Trash Housewife, starring opposite veteran actress Beth Grant. It was her first and only play, as, she once explained, she suffers from what she called "intense stage fright". Later that year, she starred opposite Allison Janney in Tate Taylor's short feature Chicken Party.

In 2008, Spencer's brief appearance in Seven Pounds as Kate, Rosario Dawson's home care nurse, garnered her high praise and media attention. In April 2009, Entertainment Weekly listed Spencer as among its "25 Funniest Actresses in Hollywood".

In May 2009, Spencer had a role in Sam Raimi's horror film Drag Me to Hell, and in August 2009, she appeared in Rob Zombie's Halloween II. She also had a role in the American remake of the Danish classic Love at First Hiccup, opposite Scout Taylor-Compton. Spencer starred in the feature film Herpes Boy, alongside Beth Grant, Ahna O'Reilly and Byron Lane. She played the voice of "Minny" on the audio version of novel The Help, by Kathryn Stockett. Later that year, Spencer's short film The Captain was honored by the CICFF as a finalist for the REEL Poetry Award.

=== 2010s ===
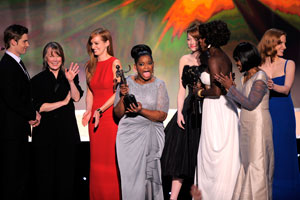
Spencer (middle) and The Help cast at the 18th Screen Actors Guild Awards

In July 2010, Spencer appeared with Steve Carell, and Paul Rudd in the comedy Dinner for Schmucks. In August 2011, she joined Viola Davis, Emma Stone and Bryce Dallas Howard in the period drama film The Help, an adaptation of the novel of the same name. She played the feisty and unflappable maid Minny Jackson. The film was written, produced and directed by Tate Taylor, and produced by Brunson Green, Chris Columbus, Michael Barnathan, and Mark Radcliffe. She won the 2012 Golden Globe Award for Best Supporting Actress – Motion Picture for her work in The Help. On February 12, 2012, Spencer won a BAFTA for Best Supporting Actress for her Performance in The Help, and on February 26 she won the Academy Award for Best Supporting Actress for the same performance; it was her first Oscar nomination and first win. Spencer was given a standing ovation at the ceremony, and was moved to tears during her acceptance speech. In June 2012, Spencer was invited to join the Academy of Motion Picture Arts and Sciences.

In 2013, she appeared alongside Michael B. Jordan in Fruitvale Station, a film chronicling the last day of Oscar Grant, who was killed at a Bay Area Rapid Transit station in 2009. In September 2013, it was announced that she would reunite with The Help director Taylor in the biopic on singer James Brown Get On Up, opposite her The Help co-star Viola Davis. The film was released in 2014. From September 2014 until February 2015, she starred in Steven Spielberg's Fox drama television series Red Band Society.

Spencer co-starred alongside Kevin Costner in the drama film Black or White (2014) and co-starred as Johanna Reyes in the second installment of the Divergent series, The Divergent Series: Insurgent (2015). She reprised the role in The Divergent Series: Allegiant (2016). She voiced Mrs. Otterton in Disney's Zootopia (2016), which marked her animated film debut.

In 2016, she starred alongside Taraji P. Henson and Janelle Monáe in Hidden Figures, a film about African-American mathematicians at NASA who were critical to its success in the 1960s in the Space Race, and who each had careers there. She played mathematician and human computer Dorothy Vaughan. The role garnered her a Golden Globe Award and Screen Actors Guild Award for her performance and earned Spencer a second nomination for the Academy Award for Best Supporting Actress, making her the first black actress to follow up an Oscar victory with another nomination, having previously won for The Help. In honor of Martin Luther King Jr. Day, Spencer bought out a Los Angeles screening of Hidden Figures to treat low-income families that would have been unable to afford to see the film otherwise.

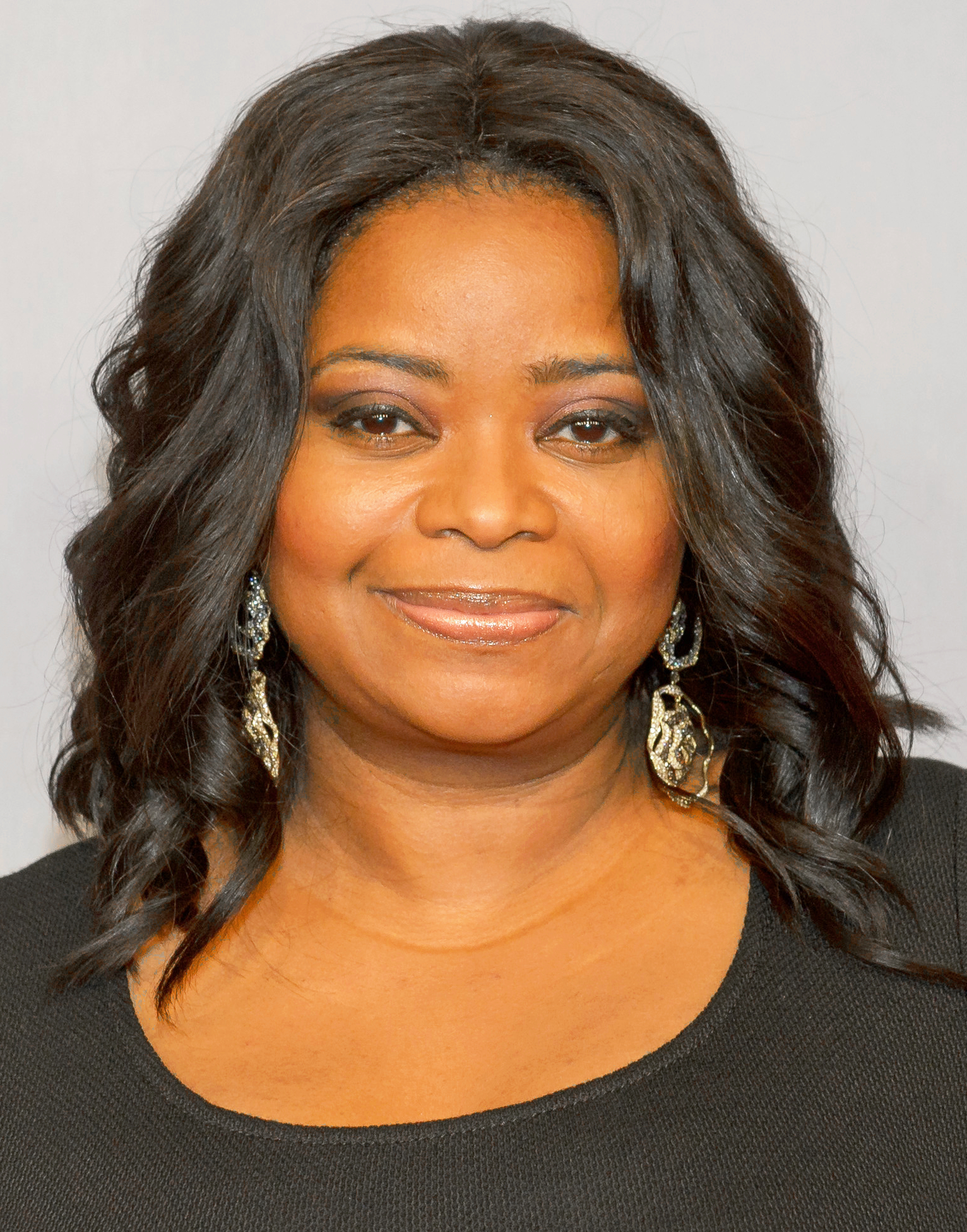
Spencer at the Hidden Figures premiere in 2016

In 2017, Spencer starred in the Christian drama film The Shack and the family drama film Gifted. She co-starred with Sally Hawkins in Guillermo del Toro's dark fantasy drama film The Shape of Water, which follows a mute custodian at a high-security government laboratory who befriends a captured humanoid-amphibian creature. The film was screened in the main competition section of the 74th Venice International Film Festival, where it premiered to positive reviews on August 31, 2017, and was awarded the Golden Lion for best film in the competition. It also screened at the 2017 Toronto International Film Festival. Spencer earned Golden Globe and BAFTA Award nominations for her portrayal, while receiving her third Academy Award nomination in the Best Supporting Actress category, making her the first black actress to receive two consecutive Oscar nods in back-to-back years.

In 2018, Spencer has starring roles as a preschool principal in the drama film A Kid Like Jake and a social worker in the comedy film Instant Family. She also executive produced the biographical comedy-drama film Green Book, which went on to receive the Academy Award for Best Picture.

In 2019, she starred as Harriet Wilson, a history teacher who makes an alarming discovery about an all-star student, in the drama film Luce. The film premiered at the 2019 Sundance Film Festival and earned critical acclaim. She then received praise for her starring role as Sue Ann "Ma" Ellington in the psychological horror film Ma, which was directed by frequent collaborator Tate Taylor. For the latter, she received a nomination for the Saturn Award for Best Actress. Also in 2019, Spencer returned to television by executive producing and starring in the Apple TV+ drama series Truth Be Told.

=== 2020s ===
In January 2020, Spencer had a voice role as Dab-Dab, an enthusiastic duck with a metal leg, in the fantasy comedy film Dolittle, starring Robert Downey Jr. as the titular character. She also voiced a manticore restaurant owner in the Pixar animated fantasy film Onward, which was released in March 2020 to positive reviews.

Spencer executive produced and starred as Madam C. J. Walker in the Netflix biographical limited series Self Made, which was released on March 20, 2020. For her performance in the series, Spencer received a nomination for the Primetime Emmy Award for Outstanding Lead Actress in a Limited Series or Movie. Spencer starred alongside Anne Hathaway in Robert Zemeckis's horror comedy The Witches, which released on October 22, 2020.

In 2021, Spencer co-starred with Melissa McCarthy as women who suddenly develop superpowers in the superhero comedy film Thunder Force. In 2022, she starred in the Apple TV+ musical comedy film Spirited with Will Ferrell and Ryan Reynolds. She will reunite with her The Help co-star Jessica Chastain for a holiday comedy film.

== Personal life ==
In 2017, Spencer described herself as Southern Baptist.

== Filmography ==
Key
†	Denotes films that have not yet been released

=== Film ===
Year	Title	Role	Notes
1996	A Time to Kill	Nurse Annette	
1996	Valley Girls	Cheerleader	Short
1997	The 6th Man	Nativity Watson	
1997	Sparkler	Wanda	
1998	Making Sandwiches	–	Short
1999	Never Been Kissed	Cynthia	
1999	Being John Malkovich	Woman in Elevator	
1999	Blue Streak	Shawna	
2000	The Sky Is Falling	Nurse #2	
2000	Everything Put Together	Nurse B	
2000	American Virgin	Agnes Large	
2000	What Planet Are You From?	Nurse Damiana	
2000	Auto Motives	Rhonda	Short
2000	Big Momma's House	Twila	
2000	Four Dogs Playing Poker	Lorraine	
2001	Sol Goode	Unemployment Clerk	
2001	The Journeyman	Black Belly	
2002	Spider-Man	Check-In Girl	
2003	Legally Blonde 2: Red, White & Blonde	Security Guard	
2003	S.W.A.T.	Neighbor in Alley	
2003	Chicken Party	Laqueta Mills	Short
2003	Bad Santa	Opal	
2004	Win a Date with Tad Hamilton!	Janine	
2004	Breakin' All the Rules	Stylist	
2005	Coach Carter	Mrs. Battle	
2005	Pretty Persuasion	Woman	
2005	Marilyn Hotchkiss' Ballroom Dancing and Charm School	Ayisha Lebaron	
2005	Miss Congeniality 2: Armed and Fabulous	Octavia – Bookstore	
2005	Beauty Shop	Sassy Customer	
2005	Wannabe	Lady Chanet Janney Jones	
2006	Pulse	Landlady	
2007	The Nines	Pedestrian	
2008	Pretty Ugly People	Mary	
2008	The Spleenectomy	Nurse	Short
2008	Seven Pounds	Home Health Care Nurse Kate	
2008	Next of Kin	Grace	
2009	Drag Me to Hell	Bank Co-Worker No. 1	
2009	The Soloist	Troubled Woman	
2009	Jesus People: The Movie	Angel Angelique	
2009	Just Peck	Detention Room Teacher	
2009	Halloween II	Nurse Daniels	
2009	Love at First Hiccup	Mrs. Hambrick	
2009	Herpes Boy	Rochelle	
2010	Small Town Saturday Night	Rhonda Dooley	
2010	Dinner for Schmucks	Madame Nora	
2010	Love & Distrust	Rhonda	Video
2010	Peep World	Allison	
2011	Flypaper	Madge Wiggins	
2011	The Help	Minny Jackson	
2011	Girls! Girls! Girls!	–	
2012	Smashed	Jenny	
2012	The Perfect Fit	Shy Girl	Short
2012	Blues for Willadean	LaSonia Robinson	
2013	Fruitvale Station	Wanda	
2013	Lost on Purpose	Nurse Keller	
2013	Snowpiercer	Tanya	
2013	Percy Jackson: Sea of Monsters	Martha	Voice
2013	Paradise	Loray	
2014	Get On Up	Aunt Honey Washington	
2014	Black or White	Rowena Jeffers	
2015	The Divergent Series: Insurgent	Johanna Reyes	
2015	Fathers and Daughters	Dr. Korman	
2015	The Great Gilly Hopkins	Miss Harris	
2016	The Free World	Linda Workman	
2016	Zootopia	Mrs. Otterton	Voice
2016	The Divergent Series: Allegiant	Johanna Reyes	
2016	Car Dogs	Mrs. Barrett	
2016	Bad Santa 2	Opal	
2016	Hidden Figures	Dorothy Vaughan	
2017	The Shack	Papa	
2017	Small Town Crime	Kelly Banks	
2017	Gifted	Roberta Taylor	
2017	The Shape of Water	Zelda Fuller	
2018	A Kid Like Jake	Judith "Judy" Lawson	
2018	Instant Family	Karen	
2019	Luce	Harriet Wilson	
2019	Ma	Sue Ann "Ma" Ellington	
2020	Dolittle	Dab-Dab	Voice
2020	Onward	"Corey" The Manticore	Voice
2020	The Witches	Grandma Agatha Hansen	
2020	Superintelligence	Herself	Voice
2021	Thunder Force	Emily Stanton / Bingo	
2021	Encounter	Hattie	
2022	Spirited	Kimberly	
2025	Captain America: Brave New World	—N/a	Special thanks
2025	Tow	Barb	Also executive producer
2025	Smurfs	Asmodius	Voice

=== Television ===
Year	Title	Role	Notes
1997	413 Hope St.	Job Counselor #1	Episode: "Pilot"
1998	Moesha	Gloria	Episode: "Teacher"
1998	To Have & to Hold	Clerk	Episode: "Right My Fire"
1998	ER	Maria Jones	Episode: "Hazed and Confused"
1999	Brimstone	Duty Nurse	Episode: "Faces"
1999	L.A. Doctors	Bus Driver	Episode: "Forty-Eight Minutes"
1999	Chicago Hope	Nurse Jane	Episode: "Oh What a Piece of Work Is Man"
1999	Roswell	Nurse	Episode: "Leaving Normal"
1999	The X-Files	Nurse Octavia	Episode: "Millennium"
1999	Lansky	Evelyn the Maid	Television film
2000	Chicken Soup for the Soul	Hannah	Episode: "Thinking of You/Mama's Soup Pot/The Letter"
2000	Just Shoot Me!	Nurse	Episode: "Finch on Ice"
2000	Becker	Ticket Woman	Episode: "One Wong Move"
2000	Malcolm in the Middle	Cashier	Episode: "High School Play"
2000	City of Angels	Nurse Bernice	Recurring cast
2000	Missing Pieces	Elegant Guest	Television film
2001	Grounded for Life	Admitting Nurse	Episode: "Jimmy's Got a Gun"
2001	Dharma & Greg	Gloria	Episode: "Wish We Weren't Here"
2001	Follow the Stars Home	Hildy	Television film
2001–02	The Chronicle	Ruby Rydell	Recurring cast
2001–02	Titus	Ms. Alice Hays	Episode: "Amy's Birthday" & "The Visit"
2002	Presidio Med	Sheryl Washington	Episode: "Do No Harm"
2002	NYPD Blue	Dawna Cahill	Episode: "Gypsy Woe's Me"
2002	Little John	Waitress	Television film
2004–05	LAX	Flight Attendant	Recurring cast
2005	NYPD Blue	Eleanor Jackson	Episode: "Old Man Quiver"
2005	CSI: NY	Child Welfare Rep	Episode: "On the Job"
2005	Medium	Jurist	Episode: "Judge, Jury and Executioner"
2006	Huff	Demetria	Episode: "Red Meat"
2006	Standoff	Rapid Air Clerk	Episode: "Pilot"
2006–07	The Minor Accomplishments of Jackie Woodman	Female Security Guard Cheryl	Recurring cast
2007	Ugly Betty	Constance Grady	Recurring cast (season 1)
2007	Halfway Home	Serenity Johnson	Main cast
2008	Wizards of Waverly Place	Dr. Evilini	Episode: "Wizard School: Part 1 & 2"
2008	CSI: Crime Scene Investigation	Sherry	Episode: "Drops' Out"
2008	The Big Bang Theory	Octavia (DMV Employee)	Episode: "The Euclid Alternative"
2008	Faux Baby	Robyn	Episode: "Valley of the Fauxs"
2009	Worst Week	Nurse	Episode: "The Epidural"
2009	Dollhouse	Professor Janack	Episode: "Echoes"
2009	Raising the Bar	Arvina Watkins	Recurring cast (season 2)
2010	Hawthorne	Emily Thomkins	Episode: "Afterglow"
2011	Family Practice	Helen Overby	Television film
2013	30 Rock	Herself	Episode: "Game Over"
2013	American Dad!	Shonteeva	Voice; episode: "For Black Eyes Only"
2013	Call Me Crazy: A Five Film	Dr. Nance	Television film
2013–15	Mom	Regina Tompkins	Recurring cast; seasons 1–3
2014–15	Red Band Society	Nurse Dena Jackson	Main cast
2015	Break a Hip	Dr. Trekman	Episode: "The Doctor"
2015	Drunk History	Harriet Tubman	Episode: "Spies"
2017	Saturday Night Live	Herself (host)	Episode: "Octavia Spencer/Father John Misty"
2018	The Goldbergs: 1990-Something	Narrator	Television film
2019	Black-ish	Herself	Episode: "Black History Month"
2019–23	Truth Be Told	Poppy Parnell	Main cast
2020	Self Made	Madam C. J. Walker	Main cast
2022	Norman Lear: 100 Years of Music & Laughter	Herself	Television special
2024	Young Sheldon	Officer Rhonda Thompson	Episode: "Community Service and the Key to a Happy Marriage"
2026	Lost Women of Alaska	Self (Narrator)	Series Narrator
2026	Running Point	Diane Robicheaux	Episode: The Strike
2026	Ride or Die	Debbie	Main cast

== Awards and nominations ==
Spencer has received three nominations for the Academy Award for Best Supporting Actress, including one win. She is the first African-American actress to receive Academy Award nominations in back-to-back years, the first African-American actress to receive two Academy Award nominations after a win, and the second-most nominated African-American actress to date.

She has also won three Screen Actors Guild Awards, three National Board of Review Awards, two Satellite Awards, two Critics' Choice Movie Awards, a Golden Globe Award, and a WSFA Award.

== See also ==
- List of actors with two or more Academy Award nominations in acting categories
