= The Help (film) =

2011 film by Tate Taylor

- Theatrical release poster
- Directed by: Tate Taylor
- Screenplay by: Tate Taylor
- Based on: The Help by Kathryn Stockett
- Produced by: Chris Columbus; Michael Barnathan; Brunson Green
- Starring: Jessica Chastain; Viola Davis; Bryce Dallas Howard; Allison Janney; Octavia Spencer; Emma Stone
- Cinematography: Stephen Goldblatt
- Edited by: Hughes Winborne
- Music by: Thomas Newman
- Production companies: DreamWorks Pictures; Reliance Entertainment; Participant Media; Image Nation; 1492 Pictures; Harbinger Pictures
- Distributed by: Walt Disney Studios Motion Pictures (Note: Distributed by Walt Disney Studios Motion Pictures through the Touchstone Pictures banner. (Note: Listed as a 20th Century Studios film on Disney+ via Hulu.))(Worldwide); Reliance Entertainment (India)
- Release dates: July 30, 2011 (Madison, Mississippi); August 10, 2011 (United States)
- Running time: 146 minutes
- Countries: United States; India; United Arab Emirates
- Language: English
- Budget: $25 million
- Box office: $221.8 million

The Help is a 2011 period drama film written and directed by Tate Taylor, and based on Kathryn Stockett's 2009 novel of the same name. The film features an ensemble cast, including Emma Stone, Viola Davis, Bryce Dallas Howard, Octavia Spencer, Jessica Chastain, Allison Janney, Cicely Tyson, and Sissy Spacek. The film and novel recount the story of a young white woman and aspiring journalist Eugenia "Skeeter" Phelan. The story focuses on her relationship with two black maids, Aibileen Clark and Minny Jackson, during the civil rights movement in 1963 Jackson, Mississippi. In an attempt to become a legitimate journalist and writer, Skeeter decides to write a book from the point of view of the maids, exposing the racism and discrimination they face as they work for white families. Black domestic workers in 1960s United States were referred to as "the help", hence the eponymous title of the journalistic exposé, the novel, and the film.

DreamWorks Pictures acquired the screen rights to Stockett's novel in March 2010 and quickly commissioned the film with Chris Columbus, Michael Barnathan, and Brunson Green as producers. The film's casting began later that month, with principal photography following four months after in Mississippi. The film is an international co-production between companies based in the United States, India, and the United Arab Emirates.

The Help premiered at the Jackson suburb of Madison, Mississippi, on July 30, 2011, and at Beverly Hills on August 9, 2011, and went into general theatrical release in North America on August 10, 2011, with distribution by Walt Disney Studios Motion Pictures through the Touchstone Pictures label. The film was a critical and commercial success, grossing $221.8 million worldwide and receiving generally positive reviews from critics. The Help received four Academy Award nominations including Best Picture, Best Actress for Davis, and Best Supporting Actress for both Chastain and Spencer, with Spencer winning the award. The film also won the Screen Actors Guild Award for Outstanding Performance by a Cast in a Motion Picture.

== Plot ==
In 1963, Aibileen Clark is an African-American domestic worker in Jackson, Mississippi, working for socialite Elizabeth Leefolt. She raises Elizabeth's daughter, two-year-old Mae Mobley, who is emotionally neglected due to postpartum depression Elizabeth suffered following Mae's birth. Aibileen's best friend, Minny Jackson, works for an elderly Mrs. Walters and her manipulative daughter Hillary "Hilly" Holbrook, who leads the Jackson chapter of the Junior League.

Elizabeth and Hilly's friend Eugenia "Skeeter" Phelan is an unmarried aspiring writer and recent graduate of Ole Miss, who has been rejected by Elaine Stein, an editor at Harper and Row in New York City. Securing a local job writing a housekeeping column, she witnesses the city's systemic racism and the demeaning mistreatment of maids.

Hilly insists on installing separate bathrooms for the maids to use. Skeeter's mother Charlotte tells her that the family maid Constantine quit, but Skeeter does not believe her. She decides to write a book of interviews with the maids to expose their experiences. Minny is fired by Hilly for using an indoor bathroom during a tornado. Hilly vindictively renders Minny unemployable by spreading the lie that she stole from her, forcing her teenaged daughter to quit school to work.

Celia Rae Foote, a pregnant housewife ostracized by the society ladies, seeks a maid for her massive house in Madison. She hires Minny without telling her husband Johnny, Hilly's former love interest. Celia suffers a miscarriage, then reveals that she had a shotgun wedding and had previously miscarried that time as well. Each time she miscarries, Celia plants a rose bush in the garden. She also treats the black eye Minny's abusive husband had given Minny.

After going to a dynamic sermon, Aibileen and Minny let Skeeter interview them. Elaine Stein tells Skeeter she needs many more maids' stories for the book, but fear of retribution prevents others from coming forward. Aibileen tells Skeeter about her only son's on-the-job death due to his negligent foreman. Skeeter delays a piece in the Junior League newsletter on the "separate but equal" bathrooms for Hilly, instead submitting an embarrassing misprint, leading to 'commodes' being deposited in Hilly's front garden. Hilly refuses to advance money to her new maid, Yule May Davis, who needs $75 to send her twins to Tougaloo College. When Yule May pawns a lost ring that was under a sofa, she is violently arrested after Hilly reports her. This incident and Medgar Evers' assassination inspire more maids to share their stories.

As Skeeter, Aibileen, and Minny fear for the maids' anonymity, Minny reveals the "terrible awful" as a form of insurance. After her termination, Minny brought Hilly her famous chocolate pie, but explains – after Hilly had finished two slices – that she had baked her own excrement into it. Hilly sends her mother to a nursing home for laughing about it.

Skeeter finally confronts Charlotte about Constantine's departure. Charlotte confesses that during a Daughters of America luncheon at her home, she fired Constantine because her daughter Rachel, arriving earlier than expected, refused to enter the house through the kitchen. Rachel subsequently moved her heartbroken mother to Chicago, where she died.

Skeeter's book, The Help, is published anonymously and read widely by the black and white communities of Jackson. Skeeter shares the proceeds with the maids. Her boyfriend Stuart breaks up with her after learning she is the book's author.

Minny tells Celia about the "terrible awful." Celia then subtly reveals this to Hilly, calling her "Two Slice Hilly". Panicked, Hilly threatens to sue Skeeter for libel but backs down when she realizes she would have to publicly admit to the pie story. Charlotte intervenes, ordering Hilly off the property, then mother and daughter reconcile. Johnny tells Minny that he knows she has been working at their house and promises her permanent job security so she and her children can leave her abusive husband. Aibileen's congregation honors her for her leadership in the publication. Minny and Aibileen convince Skeeter to take a New York City job offer.

In revenge, Hilly pressures Elizabeth to fire Aibileen, claiming that she has stolen silverware. She defends herself, Hilly storms out in tears, and Elizabeth fires Aibileen. As Aibileen bids farewell to Mae, she begs Elizabeth to love her daughter. As she is leaving, she decides to quit domestic work to become a writer.

== Cast ==
- Emma Stone as Eugenia "Skeeter" Phelan
- Viola Davis as Aibileen Clark
- Bryce Dallas Howard as Hillary "Hilly" Walters Holbrook
- Octavia Spencer as Minerva "Minny" Jackson, Aibileen's best friend
- Jessica Chastain as Celia Rae Foote
- Allison Janney as Charlotte Phelan, Skeeter's mother
- Chris Lowell as Stuart Whitworth
- Ahna O'Reilly as Elizabeth Leefolt
- Sissy Spacek as Mrs. Walters, Hilly's mother
- Mary Steenburgen as Elaine Stein
- Cicely Tyson as Constantine Jefferson
- Mike Vogel as Johnny Foote
- Anna Camp as Jolene French
- La Chanze as Rachel Jefferson, Constantine's daughter
- Wes Chatham as Carlton Phelan, Skeeter's older brother
- Aunjanue Ellis as Yule May Davis
- Nelsan Ellis as Henry The Waiter
- Dana Ivey as Grace Higginbotham
- Ashley Johnson as Mary Beth Caldwell
- Leslie Jordan as Mr. Blackly
- Brian Kerwin as Robert Phelan, Skeeter's father
- Ted Welch as William Holbrook, Hilly's husband
- Shane McRae as Raleigh Leefolt, Elizabeth's husband
- David Oyelowo as Preacher Green
- Henry Carpenter as Jameso
- Roslyn Ruff as Pascagoula
- Emma and Eleanor Henry as Mae Mobley Leefolt, Elizabeth & Raleigh's daughter
- Carol Sutton as Cora

== Production ==
=== Development ===
In December 2009, Variety reported that Chris Columbus, Michael Barnathan, and Mark Radcliffe would produce a film adaptation of Kathryn Stockett's historical fiction novel The Help (2009), under their production company 1492 Pictures. Brunson Green of Harbinger Productions also co-produced. The film was written and directed by Tate Taylor, who optioned film rights to the book before its publication. The novel's film rights were obtained by DreamWorks in March 2010. Reliance Entertainment and Participant Media co-produced the film.

The first casting news for the production came in March 2010, when it was reported that Emma Stone was attached to play the role of Eugenia "Skeeter" Phelan. Other actors were later cast, including Viola Davis as Aibileen; Bryce Dallas Howard as Hilly Holbrook, Jackson's racist town ringleader; Allison Janney as Charlotte Phelan, Skeeter's mother; and Chris Lowell as Stuart Whitworth, Skeeter's boyfriend and a senator's son. Leslie Jordan appears as the editor of the fictional local newspaper, The Jackson Journal. Mike Vogel plays the character Johnny Foote. Octavia Spencer portrays Minny. Spencer inspired the character of Minny in Stockett's novel and voiced her in the audiobook version.

=== Filming ===
Filming began in July 2010 and extended through October. The city of Greenwood was chosen to portray 1960s-era Jackson, and producer Green said he had expected to shoot "95 percent" of the film there. Parts of the film were also shot in the real-life Jackson, as well as in the cities of Clarksdale and Greenville. One of the few real locations in the book and the film is Brent's Drugs, which dates to 1946. Other locations that can still be found in Jackson include the New Capitol Building and the Mayflower Cafe downtown. Scenes set at the Jackson Journal office were shot in Clarksdale at the building which formerly housed the Clarksdale Press Register for forty years until April 2010.

The Help was the most significant film production in Mississippi since O Brother, Where Art Thou? (2000) "Honestly, my heart would be broken if it were set anywhere but Mississippi," Stockett wrote in an e-mail to reporters. In order to convince producers to shoot in Greenwood, Tate Taylor and others had previously come to the town and scouted locations; at his first meeting with DreamWorks executives, he presented them with a photo album of potential filming spots in the area. The state's tax incentive program for filmmakers was also a key enticement in the decision.

=== Music ===
Two soundtracks were released for The Help: an original soundtrack and an original score. Geffen Records released the soundtrack album on August 4, 2011. It remained authentic to the 1960s period. The 12-track collection, collated by music supervisor Jennifer Hawks, features songs from the likes of Johnny Cash, Frankie Valli and Ray Charles. As a collective, the songs spotlight the peak of the fight for equality in the United States during the civil rights movement. Mary J. Blige's "The Living Proof" is the only original track. She composed it after a second viewing of the film. In an interview with Fandom Entertainment in 2011, Blige said she was "moved in so many ways". Her raw emotions inspired her to compose the lone song for the film. The score album, featuring original cues composed and conducted by Thomas Newman, performed by the Hollywood Studio Symphony and released by Varèse Sarabande on September 6, 2011.

== Release ==
=== Theatrical run ===
Walt Disney Studios Motion Pictures distributed The Help worldwide through the studio's Touchstone Pictures banner. Reliance Entertainment distributed the film in India. On October 13, 2010, Disney gave the film a release date of August 12, 2011. On June 30, 2011, the film's release date was rescheduled two days earlier to August 10, 2011.

=== Home media ===
Walt Disney Studios Home Entertainment distributed the film on Blu-ray Disc, DVD, and digital download on December 6, 2011. The release was produced in three different physical packages: a three-disc combo pack (Blu-ray, DVD, and Digital Copy); a two-disc combo pack (Blu-ray and DVD); and a single-disc DVD. It was also released as a digital download option in both standard and high definition. The DVD version includes two deleted scenes and "The Living Proof" music video by Mary J. Blige. The digital download version includes the same features as the DVD version, plus one additional deleted scene. Both the two-disc and three-disc combo packs include the same features as the DVD version, as well as "The Making of 'The Help': From Friendship to Film", "In Their Own Words: A Tribute to the Maids of Mississippi", and three deleted scenes with introductions by director Taylor.

== Reception ==
=== Box office ===
The Help earned $169,708,112 in North America and $52,094,074 in other territories for a worldwide total of $221,802,186.

In North America, on its opening day (Wednesday, August 10, 2011), it topped the box office with $5.54 million. It then added $4.33 million on Thursday, declining only 21 percent, for a two-day total of $9.87 million. On its first weekend, the film grossed $26 million, coming in second place behind Rise of the Planet of the Apes. However, during its second weekend, the film jumped to first place with $20 million, declining only 23 percent, the smallest drop among films playing nationwide. The film crossed the $100 million mark on its 21st day of release, becoming one of only two titles in August 2011 that achieved this. On its fourth weekend (Labor Day three-day weekend), it became the first film since Inception (2010), to top the box-office charts for three consecutive weekends. Its four-day weekend haul of $19.9 million was the fourth largest for a Labor Day weekend. The Help topped the box office for 25 days in a row. This was the longest uninterrupted streak since The Sixth Sense (35 days), which was also a late summer release, in 1999.

To promote the film, TakePart hosted a series of three writing contests. Rebecca Lubin, of Mill Valley, California, who has been a nanny for nearly two decades won the recipe contest. Darcy Pattison's "11 Ways to Ruin a Photograph" won "The Help" Children's Story Contest with her story about a tenacious young girl who refuses to take a good photograph while her father is away "soldiering". After being chosen by guest judge and children's-book author Lou Berger, the story was professionally illustrated. The final contest was about "someone who inspired you". Genoveva Islas-Hooker charmed guest judge Doc Hendley (founder of Wine to Water) with her story, A Heroine Named Confidential. A case manager for patients with HIV, Islas-Hooker was consistently inspired by one special individual who never gave up the fight to live.

=== Critical response ===
The Help received mostly positive reviews from critics. Review aggregator Rotten Tomatoes reported that 75% of 231 professional critics gave the film a positive review, with an average score of 7.00/10. The website's critical consensus reads: "Though arguably guilty of glossing over its racial themes, The Help rises on the strength of its cast – particularly Viola Davis, whose performance is powerful enough to carry the film on its own." Metacritic, a review aggregator which assigns a weighted average score out of 100 to reviews from mainstream critics, gives the film a score of 62 based on 41 reviews Indicating generally favorable reviews. CinemaScore polls reported that the average grade moviegoers gave the film was a rare "A+" on an A+ to F scale.

Tom Long from The Detroit News remarked about the film: "Appealling, entertaining, touching and perhaps even a bit healing, The Help is an old-fashioned grand yarn of a film, the sort we rarely get these days." Connie Ogle of Miami Herald gave the film three out of four stars and said it "will make you laugh, yes, but it can also break your heart. In the dog days of August moviegoing, that's a powerful recommendation." Many critics praised the performances of Davis and Spencer. Wilson Morales of Blackfilm.com gave the movie three out of four stars and commented, "With powerful performances given by Viola Davis and scene stealer Octavia Spencer, the film is an emotionally moving drama that remains highly entertaining." David Edelstein of New York magazine commented, "The Help belongs to Viola Davis."

A more mixed review from Karina Longworth of The Village Voice said: "We get a fairly typical Hollywood flattening of history, with powerful villains and disenfranchised heroes." Rick Groen of The Globe and Mail, giving the film two out of four stars, said: "Typically, this sort of film is an earnest tear-jerker with moments of levity. Instead, what we have here is a raucous rib-tickler with occasional pauses for a little dramatic relief." Referring to the film as a "big, ole slab of honey-glazed hokum", The New York Times noted that "save for Ms. Davis's, however, the performances are almost all overly broad, sometimes excruciatingly so, characterized by loud laughs, bugging eyes and pumping limbs." Some of the negative reviews criticized the film for its inability to match the quality of the book. Chris Hewitt of the St. Paul Pioneer Press said about the film: "Some adaptations find a fresh, cinematic way to convey a book's spirit but The Help doesn't."

Ida E. Jones, the national director of the Association of Black Women Historians, released an open statement criticizing the film, stating "[d]espite efforts to market the book and the film as a progressive story of triumph over racial injustice, The Help distorts, ignores, and trivializes the experiences of black domestic workers." The ABWH accused both the book and the film of insensitive portrayals of African-American vernacular, a nearly uniform depiction of black men as cruel or absent, and a failure to acknowledge the sexual harassment many black women endured in their white employers' homes. Jones concluded: "The Association of Black Women Historians finds it unacceptable for either this book or this film to strip black women's lives of historical accuracy for the sake of entertainment." Roxane Gay of literary web magazine The Rumpus argues the film might be offensive to African Americans, saying the film uses racial Hollywood tropes like the Magical Negro character. In 2014, the movie was one of several discussed by Keli Goff in The Daily Beast in an article concerning white savior narratives in film.

=== Accolades ===
At the 84th Academy Awards, Octavia Spencer won the Academy Award for Best Supporting Actress for her role in this film. The film also received three other Academy Award nominations: Academy Award for Best Picture, Academy Award for Best Actress for Viola Davis, and Academy Award for Best Supporting Actress for Jessica Chastain.

== Historical accuracy ==
The Help focuses on maids during the Civil rights movement in 1963. It brings light to Medgar Evers, an African-American activist and NAACP leader, who worked toward gaining rights for African-Americans at the time, as well as aiding in the fight to end segregation. In the film, Skeeter and the two maids are seen watching Evers' address. The moment where the news of Evers' assassination is transmitted drives Skeeter to interview the maids for their stories.

In the original novel, Pascagoula, the Phelan family's maid, is the one watching the Medgar Evers address, introducing her into the narrative, whereas, in the film, Skeeter is at the forefront, placing her as the primary audience of civil rights news. This aspect of the narrative has brought forth some criticism towards the film. In an interview with The New York Times, Viola Davis mentioned that she regretted playing the role of Aibileen: "I just felt that at the end of the day that it wasn't the voices of the maids that were heard."

Film historian Allison Graham writes about this in her article "We Ain't Doin' Civil Rights", commenting that "The (con)fusion of fictional and historical events begin to operate under a different narrative license."

In criticizing the film, Valerie Smith claims in "Black Women's Memories and The Help" that the trivialization of systemic racism during the 1960s in the film makes the plot "more accessible to contemporary readers and viewers".

== Legacy ==
Davis has repeatedly expressed regret over starring in The Help, claiming she feels like she "betrayed myself and my people" and that the film was "created in the filter and the cesspool of systemic racism". Howard has also mentioned that she would not agree to star in the film today, acknowledging that it was "told through the perspective of a white character and was created by predominantly white storytellers".

After Chastain's Oscar Best Actress win in 2022, there was much interest in the fact that Chastain, along with Spencer, Davis, Stone, and Janney, won competitive Oscars since starring in the film. Additionally, Steenburgen and Spacek won competitive Oscars in 1980, Tyson was nominated for a competitive Oscar in 1973 and won an Academy Honorary Award in 2018, and Aunjanue Ellis was nominated for a competitive Oscar in 2022.

Chastain credited Taylor: "I think that's actually a testament to [director] Tate Taylor and his incredible skills at casting...I think you can see that in the careers that the women have had since his films, when you look back at what we've made and put out in 2011, many of us were at the very, very beginning of our careers. So yeah, I thank Tate Taylor for that." Howard is the remaining leading lady who has yet to win or be nominated for an Oscar.

== See also ==
- Civil rights movement in popular culture
- List of black films of the 2010s
