= Kathryn Stockett =

American novelist

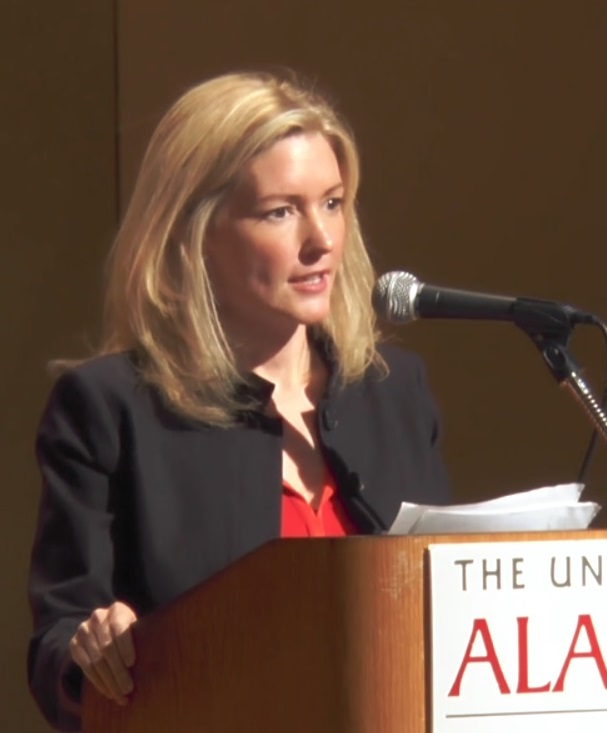
- Kathryn Stockett speaks at the University of Alabama in 2014
- Born: February 6, 1969 (age 57); Jackson, Mississippi, U.S.
- Education: University of Alabama
- Occupation: Author
- Spouse: Keith Rogers (div. 2011)
- Children: 1
- Writing career
- Genre: Adult fiction
- Notable work: The Help

Kathryn Stockett is an American novelist. She is known for her 2009 debut novel, The Help, which is about African-American maids working in white households in Jackson, Mississippi, during the 1960s.

== Career ==
Stockett worked in magazine publishing while living in New York City before publishing her first novel, which she began writing after the September 11 attacks. The Help took her five years to complete, and the book was rejected by 60 literary agents before agent Susan Ramer agreed to represent Stockett. The Help rose to number one on the New York Times bestseller list for over a year after its publication and climbed best seller charts a few months after it was released. As of 2025, it has sold 15 million copies, has been published in 39 languages, and spent more than 100 weeks on The New York Times Best Seller list. The novel was adapted into a critically acclaimed film released in 2011, featuring an ensemble cast and earning nominations for several major awards.

Stockett's second novel, The Calamity Club, was released in May 2026.

== Personal life ==
Stockett grew up in Jackson, Mississippi. After graduating from the University of Alabama with a degree in English and Creative Writing, she moved to New York City. She lived there for 16 years and worked in magazine publishing and marketing. She is divorced and has a daughter.

Reflective of her first novel, Stockett was very close to an African American domestic worker.

A lawsuit was filed in a Mississippi court by Ablene Cooper, a housekeeper who used to work for Stockett's brother. It claimed that Stockett used her likeness in the book. A Hinds County, Mississippi judge threw the case out of court, citing the statute of limitations. Stockett denies her claim of stealing her likeness and says she only met her briefly.
