= 26th Street Pictures =

American film production company

- Logo used from 1995–2020
- Formerly: 1492 Pictures (1994–2023)
- Type: Private
- Founded: 1994; 32 years ago
- Founder: Chris Columbus; Mark Radcliffe; Michael Barnathan
- Headquarters: Beverly Hills, California, U.S.
- Products: Film production

26th Street Pictures is an American film production company founded by Chris Columbus, Mark Radcliffe and Michael Barnathan in 1994 as 1492 Pictures. The name was a play on Columbus's more famous namesake, Christopher Columbus, and his 1492 landing in the Americas. The logo consists of a huge and detailed compass with the company name forming on a background, which is an ocean landscape. In addition, the fanfare for 1492 Pictures was composed by Hans Zimmer.

In addition to various Columbus films, 26th Street Pictures has also produced movies by other directors including Brian Levant (Jingle All the Way), Henry Selick (Monkeybone), Alfonso Cuarón (Harry Potter and the Prisoner of Azkaban), Joe Roth (Christmas with the Kranks), Tim Story (the Fantastic Four films), Tate Taylor (The Help), and Shawn Levy (the Night at the Museum series).

== History ==
In 1994, Chris Columbus, who successfully directed the first two Home Alone films, and Mrs. Doubtfire, signed a three-year deal with 20th Century Fox, thus eventually led to the creation of a company called 1492 Pictures. Its first feature was Nine Months. The deal was eventually extended in 1997.

In 2009, 1492 Pictures signed a deal with Korean company CJ Entertainment for three years, to produce its feature films.

In February 2011, 1492 Pictures bought the rights to the South Korean comedy film Hello Ghost starring Cha Tae-hyun and is scheduled to remake it.

In August 2011, 1492 Pictures released an adaptation of Kathryn Stockett's novel The Help.

In 2012, 1492 Pictures signed a deal with ro*co productions to adapt documentary films into scripted feature films.

In 2018, 1492 Pictures signed a deal with Netflix to produce feature films for its streaming service.

In June 2023, it was announced in Deadline Hollywood that Columbus had renamed the company 26th Street Pictures a year or two prior.

== Films ==
=== Theatrical ===
==== 1990s ====
| Year | Title | Director | Writer(s) | Producer(s) | Distributor | Notes | Budget | Gross (worldwide) |
|---|---|---|---|---|---|---|---|---|
| 1995 | Nine Months | Chris Columbus | | Michael Barnathan; Anne François; Mark Radcliffe; Chris Columbus | 20th Century Fox | first film | N/A | $138.5 million |
| 1996 | Jingle All the Way | Brian Levant | Randy Kornfield | Chris Columbus; Michael Barnathan; Mark Radcliffe | 20th Century Fox | | $75 million | $129.8 million |
| 1998 | Stepmom | Chris Columbus | Story by: Gigi Levangie Screenplay by: Gigi Levangie; Jessie Nelson; Steven Rogers; Karen Leigh Hopkins; Ron Bass | Wendy Finerman; Chris Columbus; Mark Radcliffe; Michael Barnathan | Sony Pictures Releasing | co-production with Columbia Pictures | $50 million | $159.7 million |
| 1999 | Bicentennial Man | Chris Columbus | Nicholas Kazan | Wolfgang Petersen; Gail Katz; Laurence Mark; Neal Miller; Chris Columbus; Mark Radcliffe; Michael Barnathan | Buena Vista Pictures (United States); Columbia TriStar Film Distributors International (International) | co-production with Columbia Pictures, Touchstone Pictures, Laurence Mark Productions and Radiant Productions | $100 million | $87.4 million |

==== 2000s ====
| Year | Title | Director | Writer(s) | Producer(s) | Distributor | Notes | Budget | Gross |
|---|---|---|---|---|---|---|---|---|
| 2001 | Monkeybone | Henry Selick | Sam Hamm | Michael Barnathan; Mark Radcliffe | 20th Century Fox | | $75 million | $7.6 million |
| 2001 | Harry Potter and the Sorcerer's Stone | Chris Columbus | Steve Kloves | David Heyman | Warner Bros. Pictures | co-production with Heyday Films | $125 million | $1.007 billion |
| 2002 | Harry Potter and the Chamber of Secrets | Chris Columbus | Steve Kloves | David Heyman | Warner Bros. Pictures | co-production with Heyday Films | $100 million | $879.5 million |
| 2004 | Harry Potter and the Prisoner of Azkaban | Alfonso Cuarón | Steve Kloves | David Heyman; Chris Columbus; Mark Radcliffe | Warner Bros. Pictures | co-production with Heyday Films | $130 million | $796.1 million |
| 2004 | Christmas with the Kranks | Joe Roth | Chris Columbus | Michael Barnathan; Chris Columbus; Mark Radcliffe | Sony Pictures Releasing | co-production with Columbia Pictures and Revolution Studios | $60 million | $96.6 million |
| 2005 | Fantastic Four | Tim Story | Mark Frost; Michael France | Avi Arad; Ralph Winter; Bernd Eichinger | 20th Century Fox | co-production with Constantin Film and Marvel Enterprises, Inc. | $100 million | $333.5 million |
| 2005 | Rent | Chris Columbus | Stephen Chbosky | Jane Rosenthal; Robert De Niro; Chris Columbus; Mark Radcliffe; Michael Barnathan | Sony Pictures Releasing | co-production with Columbia Pictures, Revolution Studios and Tribeca Productions | $40 million | $31.6 million |
| 2006 | Night at the Museum | Shawn Levy | Robert Ben Garant; Thomas Lennon | Shawn Levy; Chris Columbus; Michael Barnathan | 20th Century Fox | co-production with 21 Laps Entertainment, Ingenious Film Partners and Dune Entertainment | $110 million | $574.5 million |
| 2007 | Fantastic Four: Rise of the Silver Surfer | Tim Story | Don Payne; Mark Frost | Avi Arad; Bernd Eichinger; Ralph Winter | 20th Century Fox | co-production with Marvel Studios, Constantin Film, Ingenious Film Partners and Dune Entertainment | $130 million | $301.9 million |
| 2009 | Night at the Museum: Battle of the Smithsonian | Shawn Levy | Robert Ben Garant; Thomas Lennon | Shawn Levy; Chris Columbus; Michael Barnathan | 20th Century Fox | co-production with 21 Laps Entertainment, Ingenious Film Partners and Dune Entertainment | $150 million | $413.1 million |
| 2009 | I Love You, Beth Cooper | Chris Columbus | Larry Doyle | Chris Columbus; Mark Radcliffe; Michael Barnathan | 20th Century Fox | co-production with The Bridge Studios, Ingenious Film Partners and Fox Atomic | $18 million | $16.4 million |

==== 2010s ====
| Year | Title | Director | Writer(s) | Producer(s) | Distributor | Notes | Budget | Gross |
|---|---|---|---|---|---|---|---|---|
| 2010 | Percy Jackson & the Olympians: The Lightning Thief | Chris Columbus | Craig Titley | Karen Rosenfelt; Chris Columbus; Michael Barnathan; Mark Radcliffe | 20th Century Fox | co-production with Sunswept Entertainment and Dune Entertainment | $95 million | $226.4 million |
| 2011 | The Help | Tate Taylor | | Chris Columbus; Michael Barnathan; Brunson Green | Walt Disney Studios Motion Pictures | co-production with Touchstone Pictures, DreamWorks Pictures, Reliance Entertainment, Participant Media, Image Nation Abu Dhabi and Harbinger Pictures | $25 million | $216.6 million |
| 2013 | Percy Jackson: Sea of Monsters | Thor Freudenthal | Marc Guggenheim | Karen Rosenfelt; Michael Barnathan | 20th Century Fox | co-production with Sunswept Entertainment | $90 million | $200.9 million |
| 2014 | Night at the Museum: Secret of the Tomb | Shawn Levy | Story by: Mark Friedman; David Guion; Michael Handelman Screenplay by: David Guion; Michael Handelman | Shawn Levy; Chris Columbus; Mark Radcliffe | 20th Century Fox | co-production with 21 Laps Entertainment | $127 million | $363.2 million |
| 2015 | Pixels | Chris Columbus | Story by: Tim Herlihy Screenplay by: Tim Herlihy; Timothy Dowling | Adam Sandler; Chris Columbus; Mark Radcliffe; Allen Covert | Sony Pictures Releasing | co-production with Columbia Pictures, Happy Madison Productions, LStar Capital, China Film Group and Film Croppers Entertainment | $88–129 million | $244.9 million |
| 2015 | It Had to Be You | Sasha Gordon | Story by: Levi Abrino; Sasha Gordon Screenplay by: Sasha Gordon | Richard Arlook; Rachel Brenna; Benjamin Kruger | Samuel Goldwyn Films | co-production with Vandewater Media | $18 million | $7,162 |
| 2016 | The Young Messiah | Cyrus Nowrasteh | Cyrus Nowrasteh; Betsy Giffen Nowrasteh | Michael Barnathan; Chris Columbus; Tracy K. Price; Mark Radcliffe; Mark W. Shaw | Focus Features | co-production with Hyde Park International, CJ Entertainment and Ocean Blue Entertainment | $18.5 million | $7.3 million |
| 2017 | I Kill Giants | Anders Walter | Joe Kelly | Chris Columbus; Michael Barnathan; Joe Kelly; Nick Spicer; Kyle Franke; Kim Magnusson; Adrian Politowski; Martin Metz | RLJE Films | co-production with Ocean Blue Entertainment, XYZ Films, uMedia, Man of Action Studios, Parallel Films and Adonais Productions | N/A | $342,558 |

==== 2020s ====
| Year | Title | Director | Writer(s) | Producer(s) | Distributor | Notes | Budget | Gross |
|---|---|---|---|---|---|---|---|---|
| 2020 | Scoob! | Tony Cervone | Story by: Matt Lieberman; Eyal Podell; Jonathon E. Stewart; Screenplay by: Adam Sztykiel; Jack Donaldson; Derek Elliott; Matt Lieberman | Pam Coats; Allison Abbate | Warner Bros. Pictures | uncredited; co-production with Warner Animation Group and Reel FX | $90 million | $28.5 million |

=== Direct-to-video/streaming ===
==== 2010s ====
| Year | Title | Director | Writer(s) | Producer(s) | Distributor | Notes |
|---|---|---|---|---|---|---|
| 2018 | The Christmas Chronicles | Clay Kaytis | Story by: Matt Lieberman; David Guggenheim Screenplay by: Matt Lieberman | Chris Columbus; Michael Barnathan | Netflix | co-production with Wonder Worldwide |

==== 2020s ====
| Year | Title | Director | Writer(s) | Producer(s) | Distributor | Notes |
|---|---|---|---|---|---|---|
| 2020 | The Christmas Chronicles 2 | Chris Columbus | Matt Lieberman; Chris Columbus | Chris Columbus; Mark Radcliffe; Michael Barnathan; Kurt Russell | Netflix | limited theatrical release; co-production with Wonder Worldwide and 20th Street |
| 2023 | Chupa | Jonás Cuarón | Story by: Sean Kennedy Moore; Joe Barnathan; Marcus Rinehart; Brendan Bellomo; Michael Dougherty Screenplay by: Sean Kennedy Moore; Joe Barnathan; Marcus Rinehart | Chris Columbus; Mark Radcliffe; Michael Barnathan | Netflix | co-production with Pimienta Films |
