= Darby Camp =

American actress

- Born: Darby Eliza Camp; July 14, 2007 (age 19); Charlotte, North Carolina, U.S.
- Occupation: Actress
- Years active: 2014–present

Darby Eliza Camp (born July 14, 2007) is an American actress. Her career had begun through her mother, an actress herself. Camp's breakout role came in HBO's Big Little Lies (2017–2019) in the recurring role of Chloe Adaline Mackenzie, the daughter of Madeline Martha Mackenzie (Reese Witherspoon). She garnered further recognition for her appearances in films as Frankie Hughes in Benji (2018), Kate Pierce in The Christmas Chronicles (2018), and Phoebe Evans in Dreamland (2019). She reprised her role of Kate Pierce in The Christmas Chronicles 2. In addition, she starred in Paramount Pictures's Clifford the Big Red Dog and Starz's Gaslit.

== Early life ==
Darby Eliza Camp was born on July 14, 2007, in Charlotte, North Carolina. Her father, Clark, works as North Mecklenburg High School's assistant basketball coach. Her mother, Lacy, has a degree in acting and is a graduate at the University of North Carolina at Greensboro. She has also worked as an actress. Lacy let Darby and her sister, Ruthie, "get into" acting at an early age. While Ruthie disliked it, Darby enjoyed it. During the first semester of the 2017–2018 school year, Darby attended Community School of Davidson. By November 2020, she enrolled back into school after having been home-schooled for the past two years.

== Career ==
After seeing Camp's enjoyment of acting, her mother submitted her for a role. Through her mother's contacts, Camp booked roles in television series such as Drop Dead Diva and The Leftovers. In early-2016, Camp was announced to have joined the cast of the television adaptation of Liane Moriarty's Big Little Lies, which was her breakout role. While Camp was unaware of who Reese Witherspoon and Nicole Kidman were, her parents were "super excited" about them. Witherspoon gave Camp suggestions while acting, which the latter described as nice and professional. Debuting in February 2017, the series featured Camp as Chloe Adaline Mackenzie, the daughter of Madeline Martha Mackenzie (Witherspoon). The show was critically acclaimed, particularly for its performances. Later that year, Big Little Lies was renewed for a second season. Regarding season 2 episode "Kill Me", Ben Travers of IndieWire said Camp's hug with Adam Scott "shatter[ed] hearts".

In 2017, she was announced to have joined the cast of Dreamland; the film was in production during the announcement. Camp stated her dad had secured the audition for her—she was excited when she heard it as the film starred Margot Robbie, whom she was a fan of. While filming Dreamland, Camp auditioned for Netflix film The Christmas Chronicles, where she would play an 11-year-old girl who believes in Santa Claus, after her agent stated it "sounded like something [she would] be really great at". She was enthusiastic about as she "never thought [she would] get in a Christmas [film]".

In 2018, she starred in Benji, which was released on March 16, 2018, to mixed reviews. The performances were sources of praise: Common Sense Media's Renee Schonfeld found Camp and Gabriel Bateman gifted with realism and heart. The Christmas Chronicles was released in November of the same year; Camp's performance received mixed reviews from critics. Vox writer Emily St. James opined that Camp and Judah Lewis, who plays her on-screen brother Teddy, "succeed in feeling more or less like real kids", deeming their emotional moments flat and criticizing their disconnection with Kurt Russell, who plays Santa Claus. By contrast, IGN thought Russell was well-matched by Camp and Lewis. Earlier in 2018, Camp was announced to be recurring in AMC supernatural horror television series NOS4A2 as Haley Smith, a tough, adventurous, humorous, and confident 10-year-old girl, and debuted in 2019. Dreamland premiered on April 28, 2019, at the Tribeca Film Festival and was received averagely by critics. Camp's portrayal garnered praise from David Ehrlich of IndieWire, who deemed her "inquisitive but never annoying".

In 2019, Camp was announced to be playing the lead role of Emily Elizabeth Howard, a misfit who becomes best friends with a small puppy, in Paramount Pictures's film adaptation of Clifford the Big Red Dog. It was originally set for a September 2021 theatrical release though this was later pushed back to November 2021 due to the Delta variant of the SARS-CoV-2. Although the film received mixed reviews, Camp's performance was praised. Chicago Sun-Times considered her "appealing ... [and] sweetly-but-not-obnoxiously precocious", while Los Angeles Times said, "Camp is able to sell her emotional connection to the enormous scarlet pup-ernel among all the chaos, which keeps the movie’s heart in the right place." In May 2020, a sequel to The Christmas Chronicles was announced. Released in November of the same year, the second film also received mixed reviews. Writing for Deadline Hollywood, Pete Hammond considered her reprisal pleasant. In May 2021, she was cast as a regular in Starz's Gaslit where she will play Marty Mitchell, a young girl who has been overshadowed by her mother, Martha Mitchell (Julia Roberts).

== Filmography ==
=== Film ===
Year	Title	Role	Notes
2018	Benji	Frankie Hughes	
2018	The Christmas Chronicles	Kate Pierce	
2019	Dreamland	Phoebe Evans	
2020	When We Last Spoke	Juliet	
2020	The Christmas Chronicles 2	Kate Pierce	
2021	Clifford the Big Red Dog	Emily Elizabeth Howard	

=== Television ===
Year	Title	Role	Notes
2014	Drop Dead Diva	Daisy Bowen	Episode: "Desperate Housewife"
2014	The Summers Sisters	Sky	Television film
2015–2017	The Leftovers	Young Patti Levin	2 episodes
2017	Grey's Anatomy	Erin Miller	2 episodes
2017–2019	Big Little Lies	Chloe Adaline Mackenzie	Recurring role
2018	The 12th Annual CNN Heroes: An All-Star Tribute	Herself	"Young wonders" presenter
2019	NOS4A2	Haley Smith	Recurring role (season 1)
2022	Gaslit	Marty Mitchell	Main role
2023	The Slumber Party	Megan Brookman	Television film
