= Dan Zimmerman =

American film editor (born 1974)

- Born: April 8, 1974 (age 51); Los Angeles, California, U.S.
- Occupation: Film editor
- Father: Don Zimmerman
- Relatives: Dean Zimmerman (twin brother)

Dan Zimmerman (born April 8, 1974 in Los Angeles, California) is an American film editor. He is the son of editor Don Zimmerman. He is also the twin brother of Dean Zimmerman.

After glimpses into editorial jobs with his father on films like The Nutty Professor (1996) and The Cat in the Hat (2003), Zimmerman graduated to chief editor with the 2006 film The Omen.

== Filmography ==
Editor
Year	Title	Director(s)	Notes
2003	The Real Cancun	Rick de Oliveira	Co-edited with Dave Stanke, Eric Spagnoletti; James Gavin Bedford, Joe Binford Jr. and Joe Shugart
2006	The Omen	John Moore	—
2007	Aliens vs. Predator: Requiem	The Brothers Strause	—
2008	Max Payne	John Moore	—
2010	Predators	Nimród Antal	—
2011	Season of the Witch	Dominic Sena	Co-edited with Mark Helfrich
2011	Spy Kids: All the Time in the World	Robert Rodriguez	—
2012	Deadfall	Stefan Ruzowitzky	Co-edited with Arthur Tarnowski
2013	A Good Day to Die Hard	John Moore	—
2014	The Maze Runner	Wes Ball	—
2015	Maze Runner: The Scorch Trials	Wes Ball	—
2015	My All American	Angelo Pizzo	—
2017	Hot Summer Nights	Elijah Bynum	Co-edited with Jeffrey J. Castelluccio and Tom Costantino
2017	The Dark Tower	Nikolaj Arcel	Co-edited with Alan Edward Bell
2018	Maze Runner: The Death Cure	Wes Ball	Co-edited with Paul Harb
2018	The Christmas Chronicles	Clay Kaytis	Netflix film
2020	The Christmas Chronicles 2	Chris Columbus	Netflix film
2021	Home Sweet Home Alone	Dan Mazer	Disney+ film; co-edited with David Rennie
2023	Chupa	Jonás Cuarón	Netflix film
2024	Kingdom of the Planet of the Apes	Wes Ball	Co-edited with Dirk Westervelt
2025	The Thursday Murder Club	Chris Columbus	Netflix film
2027	The Legend of Zelda	Wes Ball	—

Editorial department
Year	Title	Director(s)	Role
1996	The Nutty Professor	Tom Shadyac	Second assistant editor
1997	Liar Liar	Tom Shadyac	Assistant editor
1998	Half Baked	Tamra Davis	Assistant editor
1998	Patch Adams	Tom Shadyac	Assistant editor
1999	Brokedown Palace	Jonathan Kaplan	Assistant film editor
1999	Galaxy Quest	Dean Parisot	Assistant editor
2000	The Ladies Man	Reginald Hudlin	Assistant film editor
2002	Dragonfly	Tom Shadyac	Assistant film editor
2003	Just Married	Shawn Levy	Assistant film editor
2003	The Cat in the Hat	Bo Welch	First assistant editor
2004	Flight of the Phoenix	John Moore	First assistant editor
2011	Inseparable	Dayyan Eng	Additional editor

Sound department
Year	Title	Director(s)	Role
1994	Greedy	Jonathan Lynn	Apprentice sound editor
1994	It's Pat	Adam Bernstein	Assistant sound editor
1994	Trial by Jury	Heywood Gould	Apprentice sound editor
1995	A Pyromaniac's Love Story	Joshua Brand	First assistant Foley editor

Visual effects
Year	Title	Director(s)	Role
2005	Fun with Dick and Jane	Dean Parisot	Visual effects editor
