= The Christmas Chronicles 2 =

2020 film by Chris Columbus

- Release poster
- Directed by: Chris Columbus
- Written by: Matt Lieberman; Chris Columbus
- Based on: Characters by Matt Lieberman; David Guggenheim
- Produced by: Chris Columbus; Mark Radcliffe; Michael Barnathan; Kurt Russell
- Starring: Kurt Russell; Goldie Hawn; Darby Camp; Kimberly Williams-Paisley; Jahzir Bruno; Julian Dennison; Tyrese Gibson; Judah Lewis; Sunny Suljic; Darlene Love; Malcolm McDowell
- Cinematography: Don Burgess
- Edited by: Dan Zimmerman
- Music by: Christophe Beck
- Production companies: 1492 Pictures; 20th Street Pictures; Wonder Worldwide
- Distributed by: Netflix
- Release date: November 25, 2020
- Running time: 115 minutes
- Country: United States
- Language: English

The Christmas Chronicles 2 (titled onscreen as The Christmas Chronicles: Part Two) is a 2020 American Christmas comedy film directed and produced by Chris Columbus, who wrote the screenplay with Matt Lieberman. A sequel to the 2018 film The Christmas Chronicles, it features Kurt Russell reprising his role as Santa Claus. Also reprising their roles are Goldie Hawn, Darby Camp, Judah Lewis, and Kimberly Williams-Paisley, with new cast members Julian Dennison, Jahzir Bruno, Tyrese Gibson, Sunny Suljic, Darlene Love, and Malcolm McDowell. The film had a limited theatrical release before moving to Netflix on November 25, 2020.

== Plot ==
Kate Pierce is a cynical teen, unhappy about spending Christmas in Cancún, Mexico with her mother Claire, brother Teddy, Claire's new boyfriend Bob Booker, and his son Jack. Wanting to be back home where it is snowing, Kate secretly tries to fly back early to Boston. Unbeknownst to Kate and their stowaway Jack, the shuttle is driven by Belsnickel, a nefarious Christmas elf, who sends them unexpectedly through a wormhole to the North Pole. Found and saved by Santa Claus, he brings them back to his and Mrs. Claus's home. The Clauses show them around the village, then have dinner.

Jack and Kate go to bed as Belsnickel and his follower Speck attempt to destroy the village. Mrs. Claus tells the kids Santa's origin story. Born as Nicholas in Turkey before 312 AD, he lived his early life there and became the Bishop of Myra. As a bishop, he delivered gifts to the poor and needy, becoming a local hero. He was later canonised as Saint Nicholas of Myra. He went on to save the elves from extinction and receive the Star of Bethlehem, the magical and holy artifact that stops time and provides power to Santa's Village. The Clauses adopted Belsnickel, but as he grew up and they had less time for him, he became unruly and transformed him into a human as a curse, prompting him to run away.

Belsnickel releases the yule cat Jola into the reindeer pen, injuring Dasher. He shoots a potion into the village that makes the elves crazy and steals the Christmas Star from the top of the Christmas tree. Santa and the others confront Belsnickel. The two struggle over the star and accidentally destroy it, causing the village to lose power. Santa and Kate leave for Turkey to get Hakan's forest elves to replace it.

The maddened elves' snowball fight distracts them, so Jack can escape. He leaves to get a root to cure them, while Mrs. Claus stays behind to heal Dasher. Mrs. Claus grinds the root into a powder, which Jack loads into the snow cannons. He shoots it onto the elves, curing them.

Kate and Santa successfully find the elves and Hakan, who give them a casing for a new star and Santa captures power from the Star of Bethlehem inside it. While flying back to the village, Belsnickel catches up to them on a sleigh pulled by jackalotes (a hybrid of a jackal and a coyote which he created). He steals the star and plants a time-travel device on Santa's sleigh, which transports them back to 1990. At an airport in Boston, Kate attempts to buy AAA batteries for Belsnickel's time travel device at Boston airport but, she is detained by airport security as the modern dollar bill is mistakenly deemed counterfeit.

Kate is taken to a security room. Lamenting about her wrongdoings in Cancún, a boy named Doug Pierce comforts her and helps her escape. After Kate joins Santa, she realizes Doug is her late father. Santa raises the airport's Christmas spirit high enough for the sleigh to fly, allowing him and Kate to return to the present and recover the star. Santa and Kate race back to the village, evading Belsnickel as he chases them. Mrs. Claus throws an explosive gingerbread cookie between the sleighs to prevent their collision in a game of chicken. Dasher recovers and assists Santa in defeating Jola. Kate places the star on the tree, restoring the village. Santa reconciles with Belsnickel, who transforms back into an elf.

Santa flies Kate and Jack back to Cancún where they tell an excited Teddy about their adventure. Kate becomes more accepting of Bob, and the family sings "O' Christmas Tree" alongside everyone in the North Pole.

== Cast ==
- Kurt Russell as Santa Claus / Saint "Nick" Nicholas, a magical figure who brings presents for people on Christmas night, when they are asleep.
- Goldie Hawn as Mrs. Claus, the wife of Santa Claus.
- Darby Camp as Kate Pierce, a girl who previously helped Santa Claus in the last movie.
- Kimberly Williams-Paisley as Claire Pierce, a widowed nurse who is the mother of Kate and Teddy.
- Jahzir Bruno as Jack Booker, the son of Bob Booker.
- Julian Dennison as Belsnickel, an envious elf adopted by Santa Claus who goes rogue and ended up human. Dennison also voices his elf form.
- Tyrese Gibson as Bob Booker, Jack's father and Claire's new boyfriend.
- Judah Lewis as Teddy Pierce, the brother of Kate who no longer engages in malicious activities.
- Sunny Suljic as young Doug Pierce, the younger version of Kate and Teddy's late father who Kate encounters in 1990.
- Darlene Love as Grace, a Boston airport worker in 1990.
- Patrick Gallagher as a Massachusetts State Police Trooper in 1990 who detains Kate.

=== Voices ===
- Malcolm McDowell as Hakan, the leader of the forest elves in Turkey.
- Andrew Morgado as Hugg
- Debi Derryberry as Fleck, Speck
- Jessica Lowe as Mina
- Michael Yurchak as Bjorn
- Kari Wahlgren as Jojo

== Production ==
=== Development ===
On May 14, 2020, a sequel titled The Christmas Chronicles 2 was announced to have begun post-production. Original director Clay Kaytis, who served as executive producer for the sequel, dropped out and was replaced by Chris Columbus, who produced the first film.

=== Casting ===
Kurt Russell, Goldie Hawn, Darby Camp, Kimberly Williams-Paisley, and Judah Lewis were all confirmed to reprise their roles, while Julian Dennison and Jahzir Bruno joined the cast for the sequel.

== Release ==
The film was streamed on Netflix on November 25, 2020. The film also played in three cities (at approximately 32 Cinemark theaters) the week prior to its digital release, the first time Netflix allowed one of its films to be played in a chain theater.

The film was the most-watched item on the site in its debut weekend. Netflix later reported the film was watched by 61 million households over its first month.

== Reception ==
On review aggregator Rotten Tomatoes, the film holds an approval rating of 66% based on 59 reviews and an average rating of 5.6/10. The website's critics consensus reads: "While it's missing some of the magic of the original, The Christmas Chronicles 2 serves up a sweet second helping of holiday cheer that makes the most of its marvelously matched leads." On Metacritic, the film has a weighted average score of 51 out of 100 based on 12 critics, indicating "mixed or average" reviews.

== See also ==
- List of Christmas films
- Santa Claus in film
