= Benji (2018 film) =

- Official release poster
- Directed by: Brandon Camp
- Written by: Brandon Camp; Joe Camp
- Produced by: Jason Blum; Brandon Camp
- Starring: Gabriel Bateman; Darby Camp; Jerod Haynes; Angus Sampson; Will Rothhaar; Kiele Sanchez
- Cinematography: Thomas Scott Stanton
- Edited by: Carsten Kurpanek
- Music by: Kostas Christides
- Production companies: Blumhouse Productions; Meridian Entertainment; Imagenation Abu Dhabi; Cohen Kids; Anton Capital Entertainment; Camp Brand; Symbolic Exchange
- Distributed by: Netflix
- Release date: March 16, 2018 (United States)
- Running time: 87 minutes
- Country: United States
- Language: English
- Budget: $6 million
- Box office: $585,333

Benji is a 2018 American adventure drama film directed by Brandon Camp and written by Camp and Joe Camp. The film is a reboot of the 1974 film of the same title. It stars Gabriel Bateman and Darby Camp. Jason Blum served as a producer through his Blumhouse Productions banner.

The film was released on March 16, 2018 by Netflix. It was also released theatrically in China.

== Plot ==
In New Orleans, siblings Carter and Frankie live with their single mother, Whitney, who works long hours to support them. One day, while walking home from school, the children come across a small stray dog and immediately form a bond with him. They name him Benji and begin secretly caring for him, despite their mother’s strict rule against having pets.

Carter and Frankie frequently visit Benji, sneaking him food and affection. However, when their mother discovers their attachment to the dog, she insists that they cannot keep him. Heartbroken, the children reluctantly part ways with Benji, who sadly watches them from a distance.

Meanwhile, a pair of criminals is involved in a pawn shop robbery and, in a twist of fate, cross paths with Carter and Frankie. The robbers kidnap the siblings, intending to use them as leverage. As they are taken to an abandoned warehouse, Benji witnesses the abduction and follows the kidnappers, determined to rescue his friends.

Using his intelligence and agility, Benji tracks the children and sneaks into the warehouse. He manages to create distractions and cause chaos among the criminals, leading them to become disoriented. At one point, Benji finds a way to retrieve a walkie-talkie, which helps alert the authorities to the children's location.

The police arrive just in time, apprehending the kidnappers and safely rescuing Carter and Frankie. Their mother, realizing the depth of Benji’s loyalty and bravery, is overcome with gratitude. She acknowledges how much Benji means to her children and changes her mind about keeping him.

Benji is officially welcomed into their home, no longer a stray but a beloved member of the family. The film concludes with the family sharing a heartfelt moment, showing that Benji has found the love and security he always longed for.

== Cast ==
- Gabriel Bateman as Carter Hughes
- Darby Camp as Frankie Hughes
- Kiele Sanchez as Whitney Hughes
- Gralen Bryant Banks as Sam King
- Will Rothhaar as Syd Weld
- Angus Sampson as Titus Weld
- Jerod Haynes as Lyle Burton
- Lacy Camp as Officer
- Jim Gleason as Captain Newsome
- Brady Permenter as Brute
- James W. Evermore as Hot Dog Vendor
- Tom Proctor as Cajun Captain
- Arthur J. Robinson as Mr. Okra
- Cooper as Benji
- Mongrel as Herself
- Rott as Himself

== Production ==
On May 21, 2016 Blumhouse Productions announced a reboot of the 1974 film Benji which would be directed by Brandon Camp with Gabriel Bateman starring in the film.

=== Filming ===
Principal photography on the film began in October 2016 in New Orleans.

== Release ==
The film was released on March 16, 2018, by Netflix. The film served as Blumhouse Productions' first film to be released as a family film.

Classification

Benji is rated PG for its mild violence and moderate upsetting and frightful scenes.

The film is darker than the 1974 Benji film .

== Reception ==
As of October 2021, review aggregator website Rotten Tomatoes gave the film an approval rating of 60% based on 10 reviews. As of March, 2020, Metacritic gave the film a weighted average score of 53 out of 100, based on 7 critics, indicating "mixed or average" reviews.

It grossed $585,333 at the Chinese box office.
