= The Dangerous Book for Boys (TV series) =

- Genre: Comedy drama
- Created by: Bryan Cranston; Greg Mottola
- Based on: The Dangerous Book for Boys by Conn & Hal Iggulden
- Starring: Chris Diamantopoulos; Gabriel Bateman; Drew Logan Powell; Kyan Zielinski; Erinn Hayes
- Composer: Nick Urata
- Country of origin: United States
- Original language: English
- No. of seasons: 1
- No. of episodes: 6

Production
- Executive producers: Michael Glouberman; Bryan Cranston; James Degus; Greg Mottola
- Producer: Jill Footlick
- Cinematography: Ben Kutchins
- Camera setup: Single-camera
- Running time: 24–31 minutes
- Production companies: Moonshot Entertainment; Amazon Studios; Sony Pictures Television

Original release
- Network: Amazon Prime Video
- Release: March 30, 2018

The Dangerous Book for Boys is an American comedy-drama television series, based on the book of the same name by Conn & Hal Iggulden, that premiered on March 30, 2018, on Amazon Prime Video. The series was created by Bryan Cranston and Greg Mottola and stars Chris Diamantopoulos, Gabriel Bateman, Drew Logan Powell, Kyan Zielinski, and Erinn Hayes.

== Premise ==
The Dangerous Book for Boys follows Wyatt McKenna and his brothers as they "are coming to terms with the death of their dad, Patrick, a wonderful, whimsical inventor who touched the lives of everyone who knew him. Patrick leaves the boys with a copy of The Dangerous Book for Boys, and the how-to book inspires fantasies for Wyatt. While in his fantasy world, he reconnects with his father and learns life skills that help him navigate real life."

== Cast and characters ==
=== Main ===
- Chris Diamantopoulos as Patrick and Terry McKenna
- Gabriel Bateman as Wyatt McKenna
- Drew Logan Powell as Dash McKenna
- Kyan Zielinski as Liam McKenna
- Erinn Hayes as Beth McKenna

=== Recurring ===
- Swoosie Kurtz as Tiffany McKenna
- Athan Sporek as Sam
- Sophia Valinotti as Maya Fleishacker
- Luke Matheny as Mr. Tree

=== Guest ===
- Maddie Corman as Dr. Stevenson
- Kyle Dean Massey as Jean-Claude

== Episodes ==
No.	Title	Directed by	Written by	Original release date
1	"How to Walk on the Moon"	Greg Mottola	Greg Mottola & Bryan Cranston	March 30, 2018
2	"How to Play Poker"	Greg Mottola	Greg Mottola & Bryan Cranston	March 30, 2018
3	"How to Be An Explorer"	Luke Matheny	Michael Glouberman	March 30, 2018
4	"The Trojan War"	Luke Matheny	Andrew Gottlieb	March 30, 2018
5	"How to Talk to Girls"	Todd Biermann	Brian Keith Etheridge	March 30, 2018
6	"How to Build a Treehouse"	Ken Kwapis	Laura Moran	March 30, 2018

== Production ==
=== Development ===
In 2006, The Dangerous Book for Boys by Conn and Hal Iggulden was published by HarperCollins. Soon after its publication, the book was optioned as a feature film by producer Scott Rudin.

In June 2014, Bryan Cranston optioned it as a television series after Rudin's option on the book lapsed. By September of that year, NBC had purchased the series from Sony Pictures Television and Moonshot Entertainment with a significant penalty and a premium license fee. It was set to be produced by Cranston with director Greg Mottola and James Degus. Mottola was set to write and direct the series as well. NBC did not ultimately order the project to series for the 2014-2015 television series. Cranston and Mottola continued to develop the project for the next few years.

In May 2017, Amazon gave the production a straight-to-series order for a first season consisting of six episodes. It was announced that Cranston and Mottola had co-written the series' first and second episodes together and that the project's previous creative team was still set to produce the series. On August 1, 2018, it was announced that Amazon had cancelled the series after one season.

=== Casting ===
In June 2017, it was announced that Gabriel Bateman had been cast as the series lead in the role of Wyatt McKenna. In July, further casting announcements were made including Chris Diamantopoulos, Erinn Hayes, and Drew Logan Powell in series regular roles and Swoosie Kurtz in a recurring role. Later that month, the series' main cast was rounded out with the announcement of Kyan Zielinski's casting in the role of Liam McKenna.

=== Filming ===
The first season entered production during the summer of 2017 in New York City.

== Release ==
Promotional poster

=== Marketing ===
On February 20, 2018, Amazon released the first trailer for the series alongside promotional photos and a poster. In addition, they announced that the first season would premiere on March 30, 2018.

=== Premiere ===
On March 29, 2018, a "sneak peek" of the series was held at the Paley Center for Media in New York City during a members-only event entitled "A Conversation with Bryan Cranston". The event consisted of an interview with creator and executive producer Bryan Cranston moderated by Vulture's Kimberly Potts about his career. It was followed by a discussion with the adult cast members of the series including Chris Diamantopoulos, Erinn Hayes, and Swoosie Kurtz.

== Reception ==
=== Critical response ===
The Dangerous Book for Boys was met with a generally positive response from critics. On the review aggregation website Rotten Tomatoes, the series holds a 71% approval rating with an average rating of 7 out of 10 based on 7 reviews. Metacritic, which uses a weighted average, assigned the series a score of 63 out of 100 based on 4 critics, indicating "generally favorable reviews".

In a positive review, Financial Times' Suzi Feay gave the first season four out of five stars and said, "It's a wistful and charming comedy whose essential message, echoing the source material, is underlined when mum Beth yells at her brood: "Put down the gadgets for a few minutes!" In a more mixed critique, Robert Lloyd of The Los Angeles Times said, "There is darkness in the series, but it all bends toward fuzzy good feelings in the end. Actually, it feels pretty fuzzy all the way through, conscientiously warm and mostly predictable. Lessons are learned, right on time. Some viewers, and parents of viewers, will take such qualities as a recommendation, and they're not wrong to." The Hollywood Reporter's Tim Goodman was more explicitly negative saying, "Instead of taking the opportunity for true tenderness, real emotions and actual humor, Amazon has created a show in The Dangerous Book for Boys that is just another show, period. Opportunity missed."

=== Awards and nominations ===
Year	Award	Category	Nominee(s)	Result	Ref.
2019	Directors Guild of America Awards	Outstanding Directorial Achievement in Children's Programs	Greg Mottola	Nominated	

== Future ==
In August 2018, Amazon had cancelled the upcoming season(s).
