= Dean Zimmerman (film editor) =

American film and television editor

- Born: April 8, 1974 (age 52); Los Angeles, California, U.S.
- Occupations: Film and television editor
- Parent: Don Zimmerman (father)
- Relatives: Dan Zimmerman (twin brother)

Dean Zimmerman (born April 8, 1974) is an American film and television editor. A member of the American Cinema Editors, he won a Primetime Emmy Award and was nominated for two more in the category Outstanding Picture Editing for his work on the television program Stranger Things.

== Selected filmography ==
Year	Film	Director
2007	Rush Hour 3	Brett Ratner
2008	Jumper	Doug Liman
2008	Punisher: War Zone	Lexi Alexander
2009	Night at the Museum: Battle of the Smithsonian	Shawn Levy
2010	Date Night	Shawn Levy
2010	Gulliver's Travels	Rob Letterman
2011	Real Steel	Shawn Levy
2012	The Watch	Akiva Schaffer
2013	The Internship	Shawn Levy
2014	This Is Where I Leave You	Shawn Levy
2014	Night at the Museum: Secret of the Tomb	Shawn Levy
2015	The Last Witch Hunter	Breck Eisner
2018	The Darkest Minds	Jennifer Yuh Nelson
2018	Holmes & Watson	Etan Cohen
2021	Free Guy	Shawn Levy
2022	The Adam Project	Shawn Levy
2023	All the Light We Cannot See	Shawn Levy
2024	Deadpool & Wolverine	Shawn Levy
