= Rumble (2021 film) =

2021 animated film by Hamish Grieve

- Promotional release poster
- Directed by: Hamish Grieve
- Screenplay by: Hamish Grieve; Matt Lieberman
- Based on: Monster on the Hill by Rob Harrell
- Produced by: Brad Booker; Mark Bakshi
- Starring: Will Arnett; Geraldine Viswanathan; Terry Crews
- Cinematography: Kent Seki
- Edited by: Matthew Landon
- Music by: Lorne Balfe
- Production companies: WWE Studios; Walden Media; Reel FX Animation Studios; Paramount Animation
- Distributed by: Paramount Pictures
- Release date: December 15, 2021
- Running time: 95 minutes
- Countries: United States; Canada
- Language: English

Rumble is a 2021 American animated monster sports comedy film directed by Hamish Grieve and written by Grieve and Matt Lieberman. Loosely based on the 2013 Graphic Novel Monster on the Hill by Rob Harrell, the film stars the voices of Will Arnett, Geraldine Viswanathan, and Terry Crews. Set in a world where humans and giant monsters exist, an aspiring trainer trains an amateur giant monster wrestler to go up against the world champion. The film was released in the United States on December 15, 2021, on Paramount+, and received mixed reviews from critics.

== Plot ==
In a world where giant monsters and humans coexist, giant monsters compete in a popular professional wrestling global sport known as monster wrestling, with each city having its own monster wrestler. After the wrestler for the town of Stoker-on-Avon, the shark-like octopus monster, Tentacular, becomes the world champion by defeating a bull-horned dog monster, King Gorge, he announces he has decided to represent the town of Slitherpoole.

The townspeople are told if they do not find a new wrestler, they will lose the town's stadium and its revenue. Monster wrestling enthusiast, Winnie Coyle decides to search for a new monster representative for her town. Winnie heads to an underground fight and finds Rayburn Jr., the son of the late world champion Rayburn Sr., fighting under the name of "Steve the Stupendous". Winnie interferes in the match and causes Rayburn Jr. to win instead of taking a dive as the underground arena employer Lady Mayhem wanted.

Rayburn Jr. is confronted by Lady Mayhem and threatened unless he can get her back the money she lost. Winnie tells Rayburn Jr. she can help him get the money by training him to fight in official matches. Realizing he has no other way to make the money, Rayburn Jr. agrees to be trained. Rayburn Jr. is uninterested in learning how to fight properly and wins his first match by evading his opponent. He tells Winnie he left Stoker because he could not live up to his father's name. Winnie learns Rayburn Jr. loves salsa dancing and decides to train him using dance moves.

As they progress up the league's rankings, Tentacular announces he and his agent have bought Stoker's stadium. Tentacular wants it to be demolished because he sees it as a reminder that he will always be compared to Rayburn Sr. no matter how many championships he wins. Even though Rayburn Jr. repays Lady Mayhem, he decides to help Winnie, publicly reveals his identity, and challenges Tentacular to a match for the stadium.

During the fight, Steve avoids most of the hits by Tentacular in the first round, but Tentacular counters his dance moves in the second round. After convincing Winnie not to give up, Rayburn Jr., in the third round, lands several hits with his dance moves. Winnie tells Rayburn Jr. to use Tentacular's suckers to stick him to one of the corner posts. When he goes in for the final move, the two collide and are both knocked out. Tentacular gets up first but is too rattled to end the match. The crowd gets Rayburn Jr. back up by clapping a salsa beat and he is able to defeat Tentacular, becoming the new world champion and saving the stadium.

== Voice cast ==
- Will Arnett as Steve/Rayburn Jr., a giant red reptilian monster and amateur wrestler with a passion for dancing.
  - Gracen Newton as young Steve/Rayburn Jr.
- Geraldine Viswanathan as Winnie Coyle, an aspiring monster wrestling trainer and Jimbo's daughter
  - Kaya McLean as young Winnie
- Terry Crews as Tentacular, a giant shark-headed, octopus-tentacled monster who is the reigning Monster Wrestling champion and is jealous of Rayburn Sr.'s legacy
- Fred Melamed as the Mayor
- Charles Barkley as Rayburn Sr., Steve's late father and champion
- Chris Eubank as King Gorge, a giant horned bulldog-like monster and former monster wrestling champion
- Bridget Everett as Lady Mayhen, a giant toucan-like monster with manicured nails who runs the underground wrestling matches
- Ben Schwartz as Jimothy Brett-Chadley III, Tentacular's snooty agent
- Brian Baumgartner as Klonk, a giant warthog-like monster
- Jimmy Tatro as Lights Out McGinty/Mac, a giant anglerfish-like monster and wrestling commentator
- Becky Lynch as Axehammer, a giant reptile-like monster from the underground wrestling
- Roman Reigns as Ramarilla Jackson, a giant gorilla-like monster with ram horns
- Tony Danza as Siggy, Tentacular's elderly coach who was Jimbo Coyle's former assistant and protégé
- Susan Kelechi Watson as Maggie Coyle, Winnie's mother and Jimbo's widow
- Carlos Gomez as Jimbo Coyle, a legendary monster wrestling trainer and Winnie's late father
- Stephen A. Smith as Marc Remy, a monster wrestling commentator
- Michael Buffer as a Stoker announcer
- Tony Shalhoub as Fred, a man who owns a diner in Stoker
- Greta Lee as the Councilwoman
- John DiMaggio as Tattoo Guy and Betting Guy
- Jamal Duff as Denise
- Carlos Alazraqui as Nerdle, a giant spider monkey-like monster
- Chris Anthony Lansdowne as Farmer
- Christopher Knights as King Gorge's Coach
- Fred Tatasciore as Referee

== Production ==
On February 18, 2015, Reel FX Creative Studios announced an adaptation of the 2013 graphic novel Monster on the Hill by Rob Harrell, to be written by Matt Lieberman. On April 25, 2018, Paramount Animation announced that they joined the film as a co-producer, with Walden Media, at CinemaCon in Las Vegas. DisneyToon Studios vet Bradley Raymond was originally going to direct the film, but for unknown reasons, he was eventually replaced by DreamWorks Animation veteran Hamish Grieve, head of story for films such as Rise of the Guardians and Captain Underpants: The First Epic Movie, thus making his directorial debut. On June 12, 2019, the title was changed to Rumble.

=== Casting ===
The first casting announcement consisted of Geraldine Viswanathan, Will Arnett, and Terry Crews. Becky Lynch, Roman Reigns, Ben Schwartz, Jimmy Tatro, Tony Danza, Susan Kelechi Watson, Carlos Gómez, Charles Barkley, Chris Eubank, Bridget Everett, Michael Buffer, and Stephen A. Smith, revealing their involvement in the film.

== Release ==
On September 19, 2019, the film was scheduled to be released on July 31, 2020. On November 12, 2019, the release date was pushed to January 29, 2021, as well as a planned 3D version taking over the original release date of an untitled live-action/CGI film based on Rugrats. On October 27, 2020, the release date was then moved to May 14, 2021, and moved again on January 27, 2021, to February 18, 2022, as a result of the COVID-19 pandemic. On November 26, 2021, the film made one final move to December 15, 2021, as a Paramount+ exclusive, cancelling its theatrical release altogether.

== Home media ==
Rumble was released on Blu-ray, DVD, and Digital HD on October 18, 2022, by Paramount Home Entertainment.

== Reception ==
On Rotten Tomatoes, the film has an approval rating of 47% based on reviews from 16 critics, with an average rating of 5.20/10. On Metacritic, the film has a weighted average score of 48 out of 100 based on reviews from 5 critics, indicating "mixed or average reviews".
