= Matt Lieberman =

American screenwriter

- Born: Belleville, Illinois, U.S.
- Occupation: Screenwriter
- Years active: 2008–present
- Spouse: Maya Lieberman
- Children: 1

Matt Lieberman is an American screenwriter. He wrote the films Scoob!, The Addams Family, The Christmas Chronicles and its sequel, and Free Guy.

== Early and personal life ==
Lieberman was born in Belleville, Illinois on Scott Air Force Base. He grew up in Randolph, New Jersey and is a graduate of New York University's Tisch School of the Arts.

He is married to costume designer/stylist Maya Lieberman. They reside in Pacific Palisades, CA with their daughter.

== Career ==
Lieberman started his writing career in the Walt Disney Feature Writer's Program and has written on several projects in development including Short Circuit, Monopoly, Zombie Brother and Mr. Toad's Wild Ride.

Lieberman sold his spec script, 12/24, to Chris Columbus's 1492 Pictures in 2012, which later became The Christmas Chronicles. Originally written as a found footage movie about two kids trying to capture Santa on video, Netflix picked up the script and Matt gave the Santa character a bigger part in the story for Kurt Russell. Lieberman's spec script, Free Guy, was bought by 20th Century Fox and landed on the 2016 Black List. The film was made starring Ryan Reynolds and released in 2021.

Most recently, Lieberman set deals for two big projects. Paramount Pictures preemptively acquired Yumanzu, a high concept family adventure pitch. He will write the script with Kenya Barris and Adam Kolbrenner set to produce.

Warner Bros. acquired Meebo and Me, an original comedic family adventure spec script by Lieberman. He will produce the film along with Barris and Kolbrenner.

Other projects in development for Lieberman include his spec script, Meet the Machines, for Lionsgate, and The Jetsons and Rin Tin Tin for Warner Bros. Pictures.

Lieberman is represented by Creative Artists Agency and Lit Entertainment Group.

== Filmography ==
- Dr. Dolittle: Tail to the Chief (2008) (Direct-to-video)
- The Christmas Chronicles (2018)
- The Addams Family (2019)
- Playing with Fire (2019)
- Scoob! (2020)
- The Christmas Chronicles 2 (2020)
- Free Guy (2021)
- Rumble (2021)
- The SpongeBob Movie: Search for SquarePants (2025)
