= Mr. Okra =

New Orleans vegetable vendor

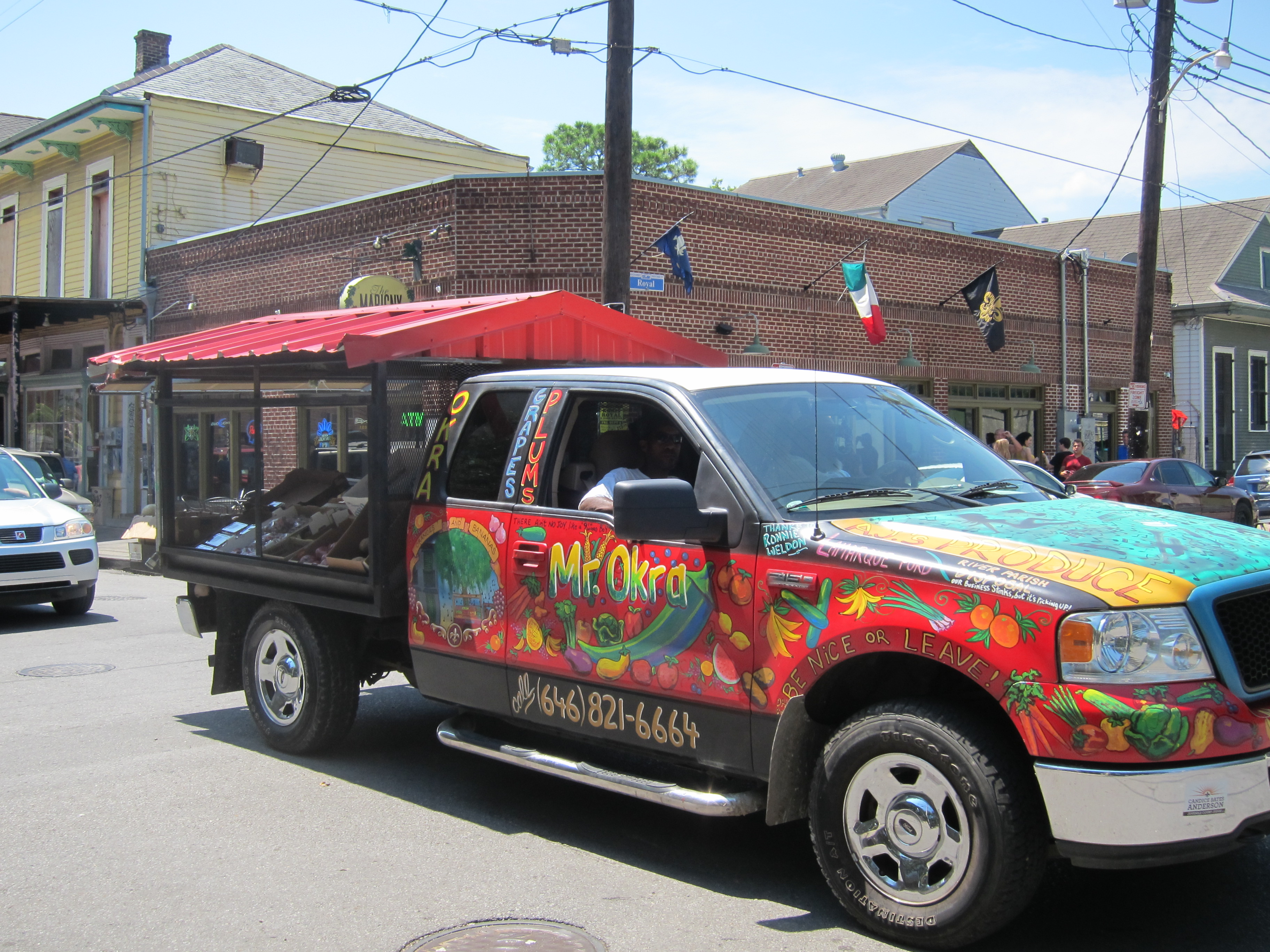
"Mr. Okra" drives his colorful truck while his son sits in the other seat ready to help with sales. Frenchmen Street Faubourg Marigny, New Orleans, September 2010.

Arthur James Robinson (June 8, 1943 – February 15, 2018), better known as Mr. Okra, was a New Orleans vegetable and fruit vendor who sold while singing from his truck. His family has continued the tradition since his death.

He made an appearance in the 2018 drama film Benji.
