= The Christmas Chronicles =

2018 film by Clay Kaytis

- Release poster
- Directed by: Clay Kaytis
- Screenplay by: Matt Lieberman
- Story by: Matt Lieberman; David Guggenheim
- Produced by: Chris Columbus; Michael Barnathan
- Starring: Kurt Russell; Judah Lewis; Darby Camp; Lamorne Morris; Kimberly Williams-Paisley; Oliver Hudson
- Cinematography: Don Burgess
- Edited by: Dan Zimmerman
- Music by: Christophe Beck
- Production companies: 1492 Pictures; Wonder Worldwide
- Distributed by: Netflix
- Release date: November 22, 2018
- Running time: 103 minutes
- Country: United States
- Language: English

The Christmas Chronicles is a 2018 American Christmas comedy film directed by Clay Kaytis from a screenplay by Matt Lieberman. The film stars Kurt Russell, Judah Lewis, Darby Camp, Lamorne Morris, Kimberly Williams-Paisley, and Oliver Hudson. It is the first installment in The Christmas Chronicles film series. The film was produced by 1492 Pictures and Wonder Worldwide and was released on November 22, 2018, on Netflix.

The plot follows two children, Kate and Teddy, who notice Santa Claus in their home and jump into his sleigh with his reindeer; however, they accidentally cause the sleigh to crash, and the presents are lost. As Christmas morning approaches, it is up to the children and Santa to save Christmas by correctly delivering all of the presents in time.

The Christmas Chronicles received mixed reviews from critics, who praised Russell's performance, but criticized its formulaic story, uneven humour, and the visual effects. A sequel, titled The Christmas Chronicles 2, was released on November 25, 2020, with much of the original cast returning.

== Plot ==
In December 2018, in Lowell, Massachusetts, widow Claire Pierce struggles to look after her family at Christmas after her firefighter husband Doug died in a fire. Their teenage son Teddy has lost much of his Christmas spirit, while their younger daughter Kate keeps it alive and continues to believe in Santa Claus.

On Christmas Eve, Claire is called in to work at the hospital, leaving Teddy to look after Kate. While watching old family Christmas videos, Kate notices an arm appear out of the fireplace and deduces it was Santa. Teddy agrees to help her prove it, on condition she give him the video she recorded of him stealing a car earlier that day.

They set up a tripwire and hidden camera, and fall asleep in the living room. After Kate awakens and sees Santa, she and Teddy follow him onto his sleigh to get a closer look. He rides off with the kids in tow, but he and the reindeer are startled when Kate speaks. In the commotion, he loses control of the sleigh, causing it to teleport and crash in Chicago, Illinois after the towline connecting the sleigh to the reindeer snaps off from excessive stress caused by the evasive maneuvers.

On the ground, Santa introduces himself and tells the kids he has to locate his reindeer, hat, and bag of presents, which were lost in the crash. This is in order to resume deliveries and prevent Christmas spirit from declining. They offer to help him to avoid being permanently on the naughty list.

Getting no help in a bar, they take a red Dodge Challenger that was stolen by the bartender. They locate the reindeer, but encounter police seeking the stolen car. Kate goes after the reindeer while Teddy and Santa distract the police with a car chase, which culminates in Santa's arrest.

Teddy reunites with Kate, and together they find Santa's bag. Going inside it to find help, Kate is teleported to the North Pole, where she encounters Santa's elves. They agree to help after discovering that she comes from a "long line of true believers." Meanwhile, a gang of thugs grab Teddy and the bag, taking them to their hideout. There, he is saved by Kate and the elves.

At the police station, Santa explains his situation to Officer Poveda. When he reveals his knowledge of the officer's wish to reconcile with his ex-wife Lisa, who shares that wish, he is taken aback. However, Poveda still refuses to believe him, and locks him in the holding cell.

As the night progresses, however, Poveda notices a higher than usual number of arrests for Christmas Eve, a prediction Santa had warned about if Christmas spirit continued to fall. In an effort to slow the decline, Santa gathers all the inmates to perform "Santa Claus Is Back in Town", which works with all the officers except Poveda. After receiving a call from Lisa inviting him for coffee in the morning, Poveda is finally convinced and agrees to release Santa.

The elves complete repairing Santa's sleigh and give him a spare hat. Realizing there is only one hour left to deliver presents, the kids offer their help, with Kate tossing presents to Santa and Teddy driving the sleigh. The plan is successful, with Santa completing his last delivery just before sunrise.

Afterwards, Santa takes the kids home before their mother returns. They ask him if they will ever see him again, to which he replies not if he can help it, but will if he ever needs help in the future. Santa gives Teddy his hat as a memento, showing that he did not really need it to move quickly or navigate tight spaces.

When Claire returns, they find the living room decorated like their father used to do it. Opening their gifts from Santa, Kate gets the skateboard she asked for, while Teddy gets a magic ornament. When he hangs it, he sees his dad appear in his reflection, and they express pride in each other.

Back in the North Pole, Santa reunites with Mrs. Claus. She asks what movie they are going to watch, and he takes out Kate's video of their adventure with a smile.

== Cast ==
- Kurt Russell as Santa Claus / Saint Nick, a magical figure who brings presents for people on Christmas night, when they are asleep.
- Judah Lewis as Teddy Pierce, a 16-year-old boy and Kate's older brother. He engages in illegal activities after the death of his father.
  - Jesse Gervasi as 3-year-old Teddy Pierce.
  - David Kohlsmith as 5-year-old Teddy Pierce.
  - Jack Bona as 8 to 10-year-old Teddy Pierce.
- Darby Camp as Kate Pierce, an 11-year-old girl who is Teddy's younger sister. Kate has faith in Santa and decides to find Santa's sleigh on Christmas Eve.
  - Kaitlin Aidree as 3 to 5-year old Kate Pierce.
- Lamorne Morris as Officer Mikey Jameson, a police officer who lives in Chicago, Illinois.
- Kimberly Williams-Paisley as Claire Pierce, Teddy's and Kate's widowed mother. She is a nurse at a hospital in Lowell, Massachusetts.
- Oliver Hudson as Doug Pierce, Teddy and Kate's late father and Claire's late husband. He was a firefighter who died in a fire.
- Martin Roach as Officer Dave Poveda, a police officer who lives in Chicago, Illinois.
- Vella Lovell as Wendy, a hostess at a restaurant.
- Tony Nappo as Charlie Plummer, an ex-con bartender.
- Steven van Zandt as Wolfie, an inmate who formerly wanted to be a musician.
- Marc Ribler as Dusty, another inmate who also formerly wanted to be a musician.
- Jeff Teravainen as Vincent, a villain
- Goldie Hawn as Mrs. Claus, the wife of Santa Claus.

=== Voices ===
==== Elves ====
- Debra Wilson as Lars
- Kari Wahlgren as Jojo
- Andrew Morgado as Hugg
- Debi Derryberry as Fleck
- Michael Yurchak as Bjorn
- Jessica Lowe as Mina

== Production ==
Development for what would become The Christmas Chronicles began in June 2013, when it was announced Chris Columbus' 1492 Pictures had acquired a Found Footage spec script titled 12/24 written by Matt Lieberman and based on a story by Lieberman and David Guggenheim wherein two brothers set out to prove that Santa Claus is real, using their home video camera and inadvertently cause Santa’s sleigh to crash after stowing away with the brothers trying to work together to save Christmas.

In December 2017, it was reported that Kurt Russell would star as Santa Claus in the film for Netflix, later given the title The Christmas Chronicles.

Principal photography began in January 2018 in Toronto, Ontario, Canada. The film was set in Lowell, Massachusetts, and Chicago, Illinois.

== Release ==
The film was released on November 22, 2018.

Netflix reported the film was streamed by 20 million households over its first week of release.

== Reception ==
On review aggregator Rotten Tomatoes, the film holds an approval rating of 68% based on 59 reviews, with an average rating of 6/10. The website's critical consensus reads, "Viewers seeking a fresh holiday viewing option – or those simply in the mood for Santa Kurt Russell – should find The Christmas Chronicles well worth a yuletide stream." On Metacritic, the film has a weighted average score of 52 out of 100, based on 10 critics, indicating "mixed or average reviews".

Melanie McFarland of Salon said: "The film's no great shakes, but Russell's star power in 'The Christmas Chronicles' is a gift anyone should be happy to claim." Charles Bramesco of The A.V. Club wrote: "The film doesn't know how to get out of its own way and foreground what's working, namely the dynamo of screen presence placed more prominently in the advertising than the feature itself." Writing for Vox Magazine, Jenna Allen said: "Above all, it’s clear that Netflix has subverted the holiday movie blueprint – Hallmark, I'm looking at you – by giving us novelty, thrill and humor." Derek Smith of Slant Magazine wrote: "In the end, the film succumbs to the tropes and emotional contrivances of the family melodrama at its core, ending up as a serviceable yet mostly forgettable addition to the already overstuffed genre of holiday-themed films."

== Soundtrack ==
The film features a cover of Elvis Presley's Santa Claus Is Back in Town, performed by Little Steven and the Disciples of Soul, with actor Kurt Russell on lead vocals. The lineup includes Stevie Van Zandt (of Springsteen's E Street Band) and Marc Ribler on guitar. The band recorded the song with Russell at Steven's studio in New York. In the film, the song is performed by Santa Claus (Kurt Russell) during a scene set at the jailhouse. Each of the band appear onscreen, including Van Zandt and Ribler as named characters Wolfie and Dusty.

== Sequel ==
On September 15, 2020, a sequel titled The Christmas Chronicles 2 was announced. Original director Clay Kaytis dropped out and was replaced by Chris Columbus, who produced the first installment. Stars Kurt Russell, Goldie Hawn, Darby Camp, Kimberly Williams-Paisley and Judah Lewis were all confirmed to reprise their roles, while Julian Dennison and Jahzir Bruno were cast to appear in the sequel. The Christmas Chronicles 2 was released on Netflix on November 25, 2020.

== See also ==
- List of Christmas films
- Santa Claus in film
