= Free Guy =

2021 film by Shawn Levy

- Theatrical release poster
- Directed by: Shawn Levy
- Screenplay by: Matt Lieberman; Zak Penn
- Story by: Matt Lieberman
- Produced by: Ryan Reynolds; Shawn Levy; Sarah Schechter; Greg Berlanti; Adam Kolbrenner
- Starring: Ryan Reynolds; Jodie Comer; Lil Rel Howery; Utkarsh Ambudkar; Joe Keery; Taika Waititi
- Cinematography: George Richmond
- Edited by: Dean Zimmerman
- Music by: Christophe Beck
- Production companies: Berlanti Productions; 21 Laps Entertainment; Maximum Effort; Lit Entertainment Group
- Distributed by: 20th Century Studios
- Release dates: August 10, 2021 (Locarno); August 13, 2021 (United States)
- Running time: 115 minutes
- Country: United States
- Language: English
- Budget: $100–125 million
- Box office: $331.5 million

Free Guy is a 2021 American science fiction action comedy film directed and produced by Shawn Levy from a screenplay by Matt Lieberman and Zak Penn, and a story by Lieberman. The film stars Ryan Reynolds as a bank teller who discovers that he is a non-player character in a massively multiplayer online game and allies with a player to prevent its discontinuation. The cast also features Jodie Comer, Lil Rel Howery, Utkarsh Ambudkar, Joe Keery, and Taika Waititi.

Lieberman began writing the script in 2016, which was acquired by 20th Century Fox shortly after. Levy passed on the script but reconsidered after Hugh Jackman introduced him to Reynolds, resulting in him leaving the film adaptation of the Uncharted video game he had been developing. The acquisition of 21st Century Fox by Disney made Free Guy one of the first films produced by the studio to continue production under Disney's ownership. Filming took place in Massachusetts and California between May and July 2019.

After Free Guy was delayed twice by the COVID-19 pandemic, it premiered at the 74th Locarno Film Festival on August 10, 2021, and was released theatrically in the United States by 20th Century Studios three days later. The film was a commercial success, grossing $331.5 million worldwide against a $100–125 million production budget, and received generally positive reviews from critics, who compared it to films and video games such as Ready Player One, The Truman Show, The Matrix, Grand Theft Auto, and Fortnite. It received a nomination for Best Visual Effects at the 94th Academy Awards.

== Plot ==
Free City is an online game developed by Soonami Studios. Its "players"—people in real life—wear sunglasses and spend their time fighting each other and causing mayhem. The non-player characters (NPCs) accept the chaos while living out their scripted lives unaware that the world they live in is a video game. These NPCs include Guy, who works as a clerk in Free City's bank with his best friend, security guard Buddy.

Unemployed software developer Millie Rusk plays Free City to find proof that Soonami stole the source code from the concept game she developed, Life Itself, which included novel artificial intelligence (AI) techniques for its NPCs. Her friend and co-developer Walter "Keys" McKey is reluctant to help, as he now works in technical support at Soonami. Millie's avatar "MolotovGirl" catches Guy's attention by singing his favorite song, "Fantasy". Guy then begins to deviate from his programming, accidentally shooting a player robbing the bank, and leaving with the player's sunglasses.

Believing Guy to be a hacker disguised as an NPC, Keys and his coworker Mouser unsuccessfully try to ban him from the game. Accessing the players' view of the game, Guy visits new areas and meets Millie at vlogger Revenjamin Buttons' stash house, where they attempt to steal evidence leading to her source code. Believing Guy to be a novice player, she advises him to level up. Guy rapidly progresses through the game by completing missions benevolently, standing out from other players and becoming a worldwide sensation known as "Blue Shirt Guy".

As Keys realizes that Guy truly is an NPC, other NPCs that Guy interacts with also begin to develop self-awareness. However, Free City 2 is due to release in 48 hours and will replace Free City, terminating all of its NPCs. Millie tells Guy the truth about his existence, but he becomes distraught and breaks off contact. Guy eventually realizes that there is something more to an NPC's existence, and goes with Buddy to get the evidence Millie wanted from Buttons, who accidentally glitched through the edge of Free City's map and discovered an older build of Life Itself, recording a video clip in the process. Guy's popularity threatens the plans of Soonami's CEO Antwan Hovachelik to launch Free City 2, so he orders a server reboot which resets Guy's memories. Guy regains his self-awareness when Millie kisses him.

Guy recalls the location of an island containing remnants of the Life Itself build and they attempt to reach it before the Free City 2 launch wipes all old content from the servers, rallying the NPCs to go on strike from the game to hinder Antwan. Antwan fires Keys, has every player removed from Free City, and sends an unfinished but extremely powerful Guy-resembling character named Dude into the game to stop Guy. Initially overwhelmed, Guy then puts his sunglasses on Dude, distracting him, and proceeds to the island. Furious, Antwan begins smashing the game's network server racks with an axe in a last-ditch attempt to stop Guy, erasing Buddy and much of the game world, while firing Mouser after he soon realized that he did steal Millie's code. Before he can destroy the final server, Guy manages to reach the island and Millie offers a deal to drop the copyright infringement lawsuit and surrender the Free City franchise's profits to him in exchange for her creation. Antwan agrees to her terms, believing she made a bad deal.

Sometime later, sales for Free City 2 slip because of bugs in the code and lagging online play. An embattled Antwan is in the crosshairs, but claims he is a victim of circumstance. Millie salvages her code and along with Keys and Mouser, releases the indie game Free Life, which includes Guy, Dude, and the other NPCs from Free City. Guy reveals to Millie that his code is actually a love letter to her from Keys: during the development of Life Itself, Keys had encoded what he knew about her tastes into an AI routine in the game, which was eventually incorporated into Free City, explaining why Guy felt drawn to MolotovGirl. After Millie leaves the game, she and Keys kiss. Meanwhile, Guy and Dude reunite with Buddy, whose AI algorithm was reconstructed.

== Cast ==
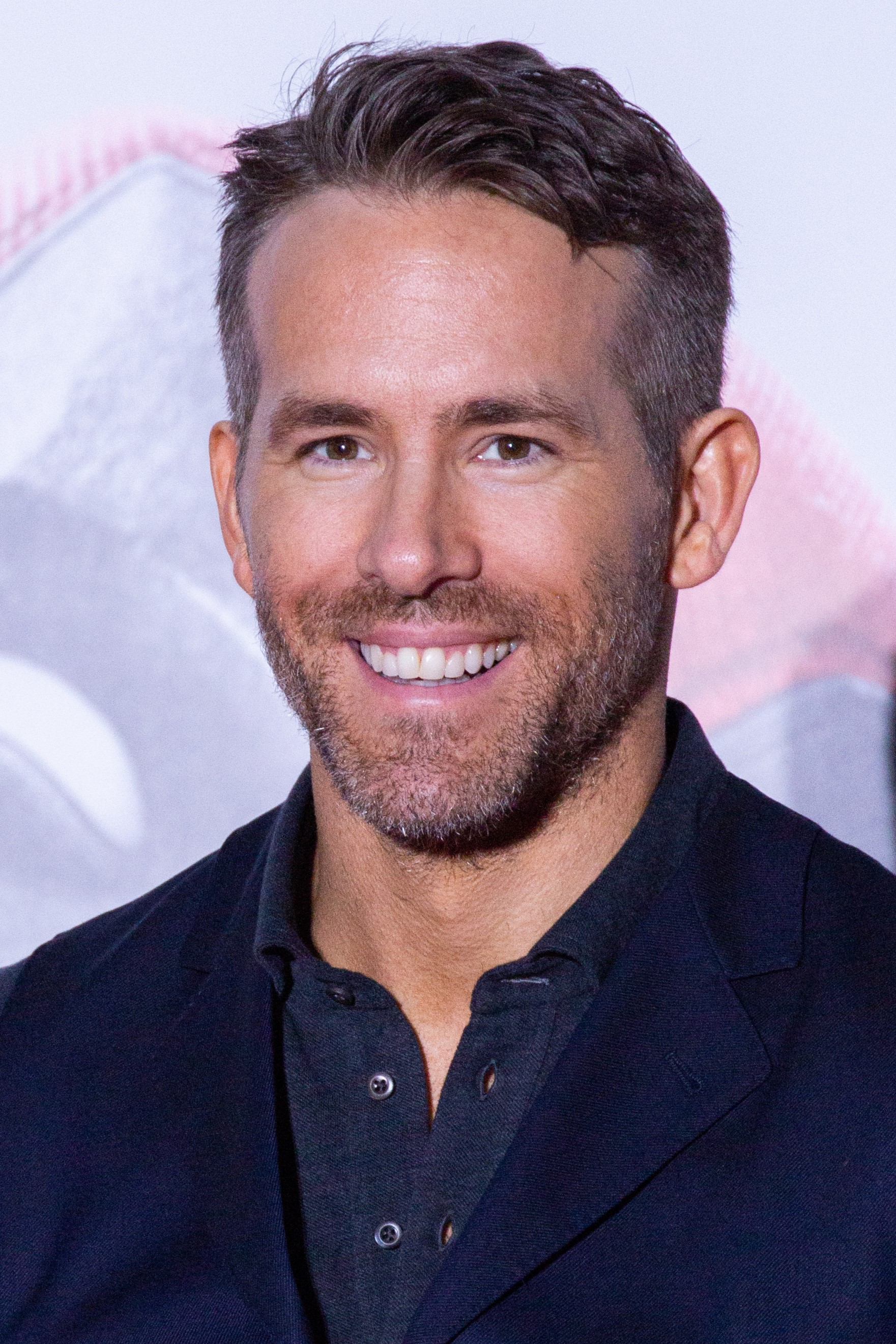
Ryan Reynolds portrays Guy and voices Dude

- Ryan Reynolds as Guy / Blue Shirt Guy, a bank teller and non-player character (NPC) in Free City who is initially unaware that he is a video game character.
  - Reynolds also provides the uncredited voice and facial motion capture for Dude, an incomplete muscular version of Guy with a blue shirt tattoo on his chest that was made for Free City 2. Dude is physically portrayed by bodybuilder Aaron W. Reed.
- Jodie Comer as Millie Rusk, a player and unemployed software designer looking inside the game for source code to her original game Life Itself, which she co-developed with Keys. In Free City, her avatar is MolotovGirl. Comer wore a short dark-brown wig and used a Southern English accent when portraying MolotovGirl. Comer normally speaks with a Liverpool accent.
- Lil Rel Howery as Buddy, a Free City bank security guard NPC and Guy's best friend.
- Joe Keery as Walter "Keys" McKey, a developer for Soonami Studios' technical support department and a Massachusetts Institute of Technology (MIT) graduate who co-developed Life Itself with Millie. In Free City, his avatar is described as a "dirty stripper cop". Keery had previously worked with director Shawn Levy on Stranger Things.
- Utkarsh Ambudkar as Mouser, a developer and Keys's coworker at Soonami Studios' technical support department. In Free City, his avatar is a police officer in a muscular rabbit suit.
- Taika Waititi as Antwan Hovachelik, the ruthless, narcissistic, and faux-polite founder and CEO of Soonami Studios who stole the source code for Life Itself to make Free City with plans to have it entirely replaced with Free City 2.
- Channing Tatum as Revenjamin Buttons, an avatar in Free City who owns a stash house that Guy and MolotovGirl try to break into to obtain incriminating data involving Life Itself.
- Matty Cardarople as Keith, a 22-year-old gamer who plays Free City as Revenjamin Buttons.

The film features cameo appearances from gamers and streamers jacksepticeye, Ninja, Pokimane, DanTDM, and LazarBeam who, in the film, provide commentary on Guy and Free City on their respective YouTube and Twitch channels from their own perspectives.

Actor Chris Evans and Good Morning America anchor Lara Spencer make cameo appearances as themselves. Jeopardy! host Alex Trebek made a posthumous cameo appearance in his final film role before his death on November 8, 2020.

Other voice roles in the film include Hugh Jackman as a masked avatar in an alley (physically portrayed by Patrick Vincent Curran) who MolotovGirl gets the location to Revenjamin Buttons' stash house from, Dwayne Johnson as bank robber #2 (physically portrayed by Owen Burke) whom Guy accidentally shoots while trying to claim his sunglasses, Tina Fey as Keith's mother (physically portrayed by Regina Taufen) who was vacuuming in the background, and John Krasinski as a silhouetted gamer (physically portrayed by Rosario Corso) who comments about Guy and the NPCs alongside the previously mentioned gamers and streamers.

== Production ==
=== Development ===
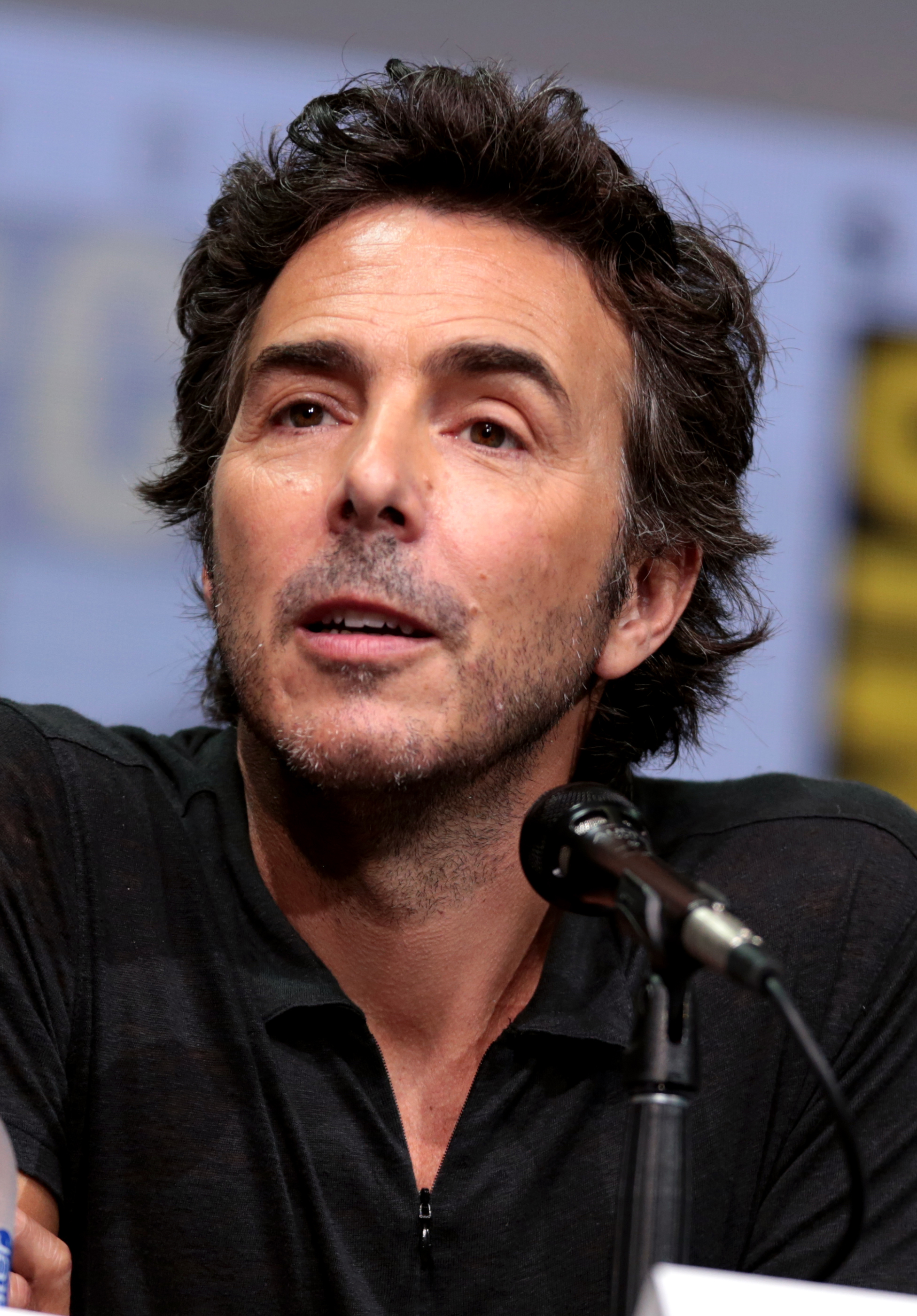
Free Guy director Shawn Levy

In August 2016, Matt Lieberman spent three weeks writing the first draft of the spec script for Free Guy. This was sold and entered development at 20th Century Fox prior to being acquired by The Walt Disney Company. Free Guy is one of the first Fox films to continue production under Disney's ownership, as well as under the studio's new name of 20th Century Studios. Director Shawn Levy originally passed on the script. After he was introduced to Ryan Reynolds by a mutual friend Hugh Jackman (whom Levy directed in Real Steel and Reynolds costarred with in X-Men Origins: Wolverine), Levy and Reynolds decided to work on Free Guy after rereading it together. Reynolds, who also produced the film, said, "I haven't been this fully immersed and engaged in something since Deadpool." Levy had previously been attached to the film Uncharted, an adaptation of the video game series of the same name, before he left to make Free Guy.

=== Filming ===
Principal photography began on May 14, 2019, in Boston, mostly around the city's Financial District. It also took place in the Massachusetts cities of Worcester, Framingham (in the former Framingham Savings Bank building), and Weymouth (at the former Naval Air Station), as well as at Revere Beach and the Paramount Pictures studio headquarters in Los Angeles, California. Filming concluded on July 31, 2019.

=== Design and cultural references ===
Levy decided to hire production designer Ethan Tobman over other candidates with more feature film experience after being inspired by the energy he brought to the project. Together they created a visual bible laying out the rules for their video game world. To split the real world from the in-game look they specified colors, lenses, composition and framing, camera movement, and other details. Levy found it liberating to be influenced by other games and films but not required to make a direct adaptation of an existing franchise. Tobman said the film's game-world design drew primary inspiration from games like SimCity, The Sims and Red Dead Redemption 2, while also acknowledging thematic inspiration from Grand Theft Auto and Fortnite. In order to help Reynolds fully tap into his Guy character after Deadpool, Levy suggested that he tap into his Canadian background and act very friendly, full of joy, a typical Canadian citizen. He also found inspiration in Peter Sellers' role in Being There and Will Ferrell's role in Elf because they played characters who were similar to Guy's character being simple-minded.

The film features several weapons from other video game and film franchises, including the Scorpion from Halo: Combat Evolved, a Mega Buster from Mega Man, a lightsaber from Star Wars, one of Fortnite's pickaxes, the gravity gun from Half-Life 2, the portal gun from Portal, as well as Captain America's shield and Hulk's fist from the Marvel Cinematic Universe. When the film was acquired by Disney, which owns the Marvel and Star Wars franchises, the filmmakers made a request to use iconic weapons from those properties, and were granted permission to use everything they requested. The cameo by Chris Evans was suggested by Reynolds' wife Blake Lively. Levy contacted Evans, who was already in Boston shooting Defending Jacob and asked if he would come by for ten minutes, and he agreed.

== Music ==
The film's score was composed by Christophe Beck. Portions of the film's score are sampled from the Disney animated short film Paperman, which Beck had previously scored. Levy had originally intended to use the song "Your Love" by the Outfield, but Reynolds suggested using "Fantasy" by Mariah Carey instead. Reynolds talked to Carey about obtaining permission to use it and she allowed them to use the song throughout the film. A cover version of "Fantasy" sung by Comer was also used in the film.

== Marketing ==
When promoting the film in 2019, Reynolds and Waititi joked that it was nice to work together for the first time, pretending that they knew nothing about their previous experience working together on the poorly-received 2011 Green Lantern film. In July 2021, Reynolds released a video on YouTube titled Deadpool and Korg React, in which he reprised his role as Wade Wilson/Deadpool from the X-Men film series and Waititi reprised his role as Korg from the Marvel Cinematic Universe reacting to the trailer to Free Guy.

On August 12, 2021, Dude became a purchasable outfit in the video game Fortnite alongside a series of optional quests placed into the game to allow players to unlock an emote with Reynolds's voice. Free Guy's marketing team created parody posters in the style of other video games, including Super Mario 64, Minecraft, Among Us, Grand Theft Auto: Vice City, Mega Man, Street Fighter II, Doom, and Animal Crossing: New Horizons.

== Release ==
=== Theatrical ===
Free Guy was released in the United States on August 13, 2021 in RealD 3D, IMAX, 4DX and Dolby Cinema formats. It was the first film from Walt Disney Studios during the COVID-19 pandemic released exclusively to theaters for 45 days before releasing on streaming services. The film was initially scheduled to be released on July 3, 2020, but it was delayed because of the pandemic. It was then moved to December 11, 2020. In November 2020, the studio removed the film, along with Death on the Nile, from its upcoming release schedule until further notice. The next month, the film was rescheduled to May 21, 2021. In March, Ryan Reynolds announced that Free Guy was delayed to its August date. The film premiered at the Piazza Grande section of the 74th Locarno Film Festival in Switzerland in August 2021.

=== Home media ===
Free Guy was released on digital on September 28, 2021, 45 days after its theatrical release, and was released on 4K, DVD, and Blu-ray by Walt Disney Studios Home Entertainment on October 12, two months after its theatrical release. It was added to Disney+ and HBO Max in the United States on February 23, 2022. According to Samba TV, the film was watched by 2.5 million US households in its first five days of streaming on Disney+ and HBO Max. According to the streaming aggregator JustWatch, Free Guy was the most streamed film across all platforms in the United States, during the week ending February 27, 2022.

== Reception ==
=== Box office ===
Free Guy grossed $121.6 million in the United States and Canada, and $209.9 million in other territories, for a worldwide total of $331.5 million.

In the United States and Canada, Free Guy was released alongside Respect and Don't Breathe 2, and was initially projected to gross $15–18 million from 4,165 theaters in its opening weekend. However, after making $10.5 million on its first day (including $2.2 million from Thursday-night previews), estimates were raised to $26 million. It went on to debut to $28.4 million, topping the box office. The film made $18.5 million in its second weekend, remaining in first. The drop of just 34% marked the smallest second-weekend decline of any wide release of the summer and the second-best of Reynolds' career. In its third weekend, it was beaten by newcomer Candyman, but the film continued to hold well, falling by 27% earning $13.6 million.

=== Critical response ===
On review aggregator Rotten Tomatoes, the film has an approval rating of 80% based on 297 reviews and an average rating of 7/10. The website's critics consensus reads, "Combining a clever concept, sweet, self-aware humor, and a charming cast, Free Guy is frivolous fun." On Metacritic, the film has a weighted average score of 62 out of 100 based on 51 critics, indicating "generally favorable" reviews. Audiences polled by CinemaScore gave the film an average grade of "A" on an A+ to F scale.

Peter Debruge of Variety magazine called the film an "at-times unwieldy mashup of multiple-reality blockbusters like The Matrix and The Lego Movie" and said that "Free Guy is a lot of fun, despite the fact that Levy and the screenwriters seem to be changing the rules as they go." Richard Roeper of the Chicago Sun-Times lauded both the "perfectly cast" Reynolds and "superb and charming Jodie Comer." Giving the film three out of four stars, he wrote "Thanks in large part to the vibrant, funny, sweet, endearing work by Reynolds and Comer, Free Guy delivers." A.A. Dowd of The A.V. Club gave the film a C+ grade and said, "For all its casual mayhem, Free Guy turns out to be a rather cuddly crowdpleaser, a high-concept blockbuster trifle with bubblegum ice cream clogging its circuits." Dowd contrasted the film with The Truman Show, saying "Reynolds replicates that slightly unhinged Truman Burbank grin but not the desperation behind it." Nick De Semlyen of Empire was critical of the film; he compared it unfavorably to 2018's Ready Player One, and said that although it is "eager to please" it "doesn't really hang together, even as you're watching it."

The film ranks sixth on Rotten Tomatoes' Best Science Fiction Movies of 2021.

=== Accolades ===
Accolades received by Free Guy
| Award | Date of ceremony | Category | Recipient(s) | Result | Ref. |
|---|---|---|---|---|---|
| Academy Awards | March 27, 2022 | Best Visual Effects | Swen Gillberg, Bryan Grill, Nikos Kalaitzidis, and Dan Sudick | Nominated | |
| British Academy Film Awards | March 13, 2022 | Best Special Visual Effects | Swen Gillberg, Bryan Grill, Nikos Kalaitzidis, and Dan Sudick | Nominated | |
| Critics' Choice Movie Awards | March 13, 2022 | Best Comedy | Free Guy | Nominated | |
| Critics' Choice Super Awards | March 17, 2022 | Best Science Fiction/Fantasy Movie | Free Guy | Nominated | |
| Critics' Choice Super Awards | March 17, 2022 | Best Actor in a Science Fiction/Fantasy Movie | Ryan Reynolds | Nominated | |
| Critics' Choice Super Awards | March 17, 2022 | Best Actress in a Science Fiction/Fantasy Movie | Jodie Comer | Nominated | |
| Golden Trailer Awards | October 7, 2022 | Best Viral Campaign for a Feature Film | Free Guy | Won | |
| Hollywood Critics Association Film Awards | February 28, 2022 | Best Comedy or Musical | Free Guy | Nominated | |
| Hollywood Critics Association Film Awards | February 28, 2022 | Best Visual Effects | Swen Gillberg, Bryan Grill, Nikos Kalaitzidis, and Dan Sudick | Nominated | |
| MTV Movie & TV Awards | June 5, 2022 | Best Comedic Performance | Ryan Reynolds | Won | |
| MTV Movie & TV Awards | June 5, 2022 | Best Fight | Guy vs. Dude | Nominated | |
| Nickelodeon Kids' Choice Awards | April 9, 2022 | Favorite Movie Actor | Ryan Reynolds | Nominated | |
| People's Choice Awards | December 7, 2021 | The Comedy Movie of 2021 | Free Guy | Won | |
| People's Choice Awards | December 7, 2021 | The Male Movie Star of 2021 | Ryan Reynolds | Nominated | |
| People's Choice Awards | December 7, 2021 | The Comedy Movie Star of 2021 | Ryan Reynolds | Nominated | |
| Saturn Awards | October 25, 2022 | Best Science Fiction Film | Free Guy | Nominated | |
| Saturn Awards | October 25, 2022 | Best Supporting Actress | Jodie Comer | Nominated | |

== Possible sequel ==
In August 2021, following Free Guy's successful first-day box-office gross, Reynolds confirmed that Disney wanted a sequel. In March 2022, Steve Asbell, president of 20th Century Studios, said a script was being submitted shortly and called the sequel "a fantastic story". Comer has expressed interest in returning for a sequel, stating, "I would honestly jump at the chance to be back on a set with all those guys. [The first movie] was such a joyous experience – so to hear that that may be in the cards sound like a ton of fun."

In September 2023, Levy said the story for the sequel was being revised in response to the film Barbie. Levy stated, "We are developing a sequel, but the truth is that you now have Barbie that has obviously left a mark about a character in a fictional world who comes to self-awareness. So, we're only gonna make Free Guy 2 if it's different than the first movie and if it's different from other movies."
