= Skipping Christmas =

Novel by John Grisham

- First edition
- Author: John Grisham
- Illustrator: Andrew Davidson
- Language: English
- Publisher: Doubleday
- Publication date: November 2001
- Publication place: United States
- Media type: Print (Hardcover)
- Pages: 198 pages
- ISBN: 0-385-50583-3
- OCLC: 54083800
- Dewey Decimal: 813/.54 21
- LC Class: PS3557.R5355 S58 2001

Skipping Christmas is a comedic novel by John Grisham. It was published by Doubleday on November 6, 2001, and reached #1 on The New York Times Best-Seller List on December 9 that year. It was also released as a four-CD audiobook, narrated by actor Dennis Boutsikaris, by Random House Audio Publishing Group in October 2006. The book was adapted into the film Christmas with the Kranks (2004), directed by Joe Roth and written by Chris Columbus.

== Plot ==
On the Sunday after Thanksgiving, Luther and Nora Krank take their daughter Blair to the airport for a year-long Peace Corps assignment in Peru. Seeing all of the busy traveling at the airport, Luther grows resentful of Christmas traditions, especially with Blair away. A rainy errand to a packed grocery store leaves him soaked, and he realizes he forgot to retrieve white chocolate, forcing Nora to get it herself.

Nora bemoans that this will be their first Christmas apart as a family. Luther calculates they spent $6,100 the previous year on decorations, gifts, and entertaining, but have little to show for it. He proposes skipping the holiday entirely and booking a 10-day Caribbean cruise on the Island Princess. Nora agrees only if they still donate $600 to the church and Children's Hospital, to which Luther reluctantly consents. They cancel their Christmas shopping, Christmas tree, and their annual Christmas Eve party.

Their neighbors on Hemlock Street strongly protest, fearing the undecorated Krank house will cost the block the prize for best decorated block. The townspeople, led by Vic Frohmeyer, pressure Luther and Nora by extending a perimeter of people around their lawn, engineering Christmas caroling on the Kranks' lawn, calling repeatedly to demand that they decorate their house for Christmas, and picketing with signs. The local charities are equally offended; the Boy Scout troop is deprived of the Kranks' Christmas tree sale, the police do not get a calendar sale, the firemen are denied a fruitcake order, and the stationer loses their annual order of engraved greeting cards. A newspaper recruits Luther's rival Walt Scheel to film the Kranks' barren house. Luther and Nora endure the scorn as they await their Christmas Day departure.

On Christmas Eve, Blair unexpectedly calls from Miami to announce she is en route home with her new Peruvian fiancé, Enrique, to share her family's Christmas traditions, and asks if the usual party is still on. When Nora affirms this in a panic, the couple scramble to decorate the house and coordinate a party with only hours to spare. The Boy Scouts have sold out of Christmas trees, so Luther borrows one from a vacationing neighbor. He and Vic Frohmeyer's son Spike try to transport it across the street, but other neighbors mistake the act for a theft and call the police, nearly getting Luther arrested.

While attempting to mount Frosty the Snowman on the roof, Luther slips and ends up dangling by its electric cord until Scheel rescues him. The Kranks' neighbors rally to supply the decorations, food, and festivities Blair expects. When Blair arrives at the airport, Vic arranges for a police escort to retrieve her as the injured Luther recovers. The community's show of generosity renews Luther's Christmas spirit, and he gives his cruise tickets to the Scheels, whose own holiday has been spoiled by Walt's wife's third recurrence of breast cancer.

== Critical reception ==
Publishers Weekly observed, "For all its clever curmudgeonly edge and minor charms, no way does this Christmas yarn from Grisham rank with A Christmas Carol, as the publisher claims. Nor does it rank with Grisham's own best work. The premise is terrific, as you'd expect from Grisham ... But as clever as this setup is, its elaboration is ho-hum. There's a good reason why nearly all classic Christmas tales rely on an element of fantasy, for, literarily at least, Christmas is a time of miracles. Grisham sticks to the mundane, however, and his story lacks magic for that ... The misanthropy in this short novel makes a good antidote to the more cloying Christmas tales, and the book is fun to read. To compare it to Dickens, however, is ... humbug."

Bruce Fretts of Entertainment Weekly graded the book C+ and commented, "Even at 177 minipages, Skipping Christmas feels padded ... Despite a few nicely observed details ... Grisham mostly trades in stale fruitcake jokes and sub–Christmas Vacation slapstick. Like his recent coming-of-age novel, A Painted House, Skipping represents a departure for the king of the legal thrillers, but in this case, it's to an unworthy destination."

== See also ==
- List of Christmas-themed literature
