= Christmas with the Kranks =

2004 American Christmas comedy film

- Theatrical release poster
- Directed by: Joe Roth
- Screenplay by: Chris Columbus
- Based on: Skipping Christmas by John Grisham
- Produced by: Michael Barnathan; Chris Columbus; Mark Radcliffe
- Starring: Tim Allen; Jamie Lee Curtis; Dan Aykroyd; Erik Per Sullivan; Cheech Marin; Jake Busey; M. Emmet Walsh
- Cinematography: Don Burgess
- Edited by: Nick Moore
- Music by: John Debney
- Production companies: Columbia Pictures; Revolution Studios; 1492 Pictures
- Distributed by: Sony Pictures Releasing
- Release date: November 24, 2004
- Running time: 98 minutes
- Country: United States
- Language: English
- Budget: $60 million
- Box office: $96.6 million

Christmas with the Kranks is a 2004 American Christmas comedy film directed by Joe Roth from a screenplay by Chris Columbus, and starring Tim Allen, Jamie Lee Curtis, Dan Aykroyd, Erik Per Sullivan, Cheech Marin, Jake Busey, and M. Emmet Walsh. Based on the 2001 novel Skipping Christmas by John Grisham, it follows a middle-aged couple who, much to the chagrin of their neighbors, decide to forgo their Christmas celebrations after their daughter leaves for the Peace Corps until she unexpectedly decides to return home for the holidays.

Christmas with the Kranks was produced by Columbia Pictures, Revolution Studios and 1492 Pictures and released in the United States on November 24, 2004, by Sony Pictures Releasing. The film was a moderate box-office success, grossing $96.6 million worldwide against a $60 million budget, though it received largely unfavorable reviews from critics. Retrospectively, it has received positive reappraisal by some publications.

== Plot ==
After Riverside couple Luther and Nora Krank see their daughter Blair depart for a Peace Corps assignment in Peru on the Sunday following Thanksgiving, empty nest syndrome sets in. Luther calculates that they spent over $6,000 during the previous year's holiday season and convinces Nora to instead go on a Caribbean cruise this year, insisting that they "skip Christmas".

The Kranks discover they are considered pariahs for choosing to skip the holidays. Most vocal in their objections are neighbors Vic Frohmeyer and Walt Scheel. Vic, the self-proclaimed leader of the street, organizes a campaign to force the Kranks to decorate their home. Walt seems to dislike Luther, so his efforts are primarily personal. However, Walt's wife Bev is suffering from cancer, perhaps dampening his holiday spirits.

Children, led by Vic's son Spike, push them to put up a Frosty the Snowman decoration, and Christmas carolers try to revive the Kranks' holiday spirit by singing on their lawn, which Luther stops by icing it. The newspaper prints a front-page story complete with a photograph of the unlit Krank house, and Luther's office colleagues, scout tree salesmen, and police fund collectors are also annoyed.

On Christmas Eve morning, the Kranks are packing for the cruise when they receive a call from Blair, who announces she is at MIA, en route home with her Peruvian fiancé, Enrique, as a surprise for her parents. When Blair asks if they are having their usual party that night, a panicked Nora says yes. Luther and Nora try to decorate the house and coordinate a party with only 12 hours before Blair and Enrique arrive.

While Nora scrambles to find food, Luther goes to buy a tree but comes home with only a small, dried-up one. He attempts to borrow the indoor tree from neighbor Wes Trogdon, who is going away for a week. He enlists Spike's help to transport the tree across the street, but the neighbors spot him and, assuming he is stealing it, call the police. Spike shows that Luther has Trogdon's keys and thus was given permission to borrow the tree. Nora comes home with only smoked trout and tells Luther to put Frosty on their roof, but he and Frosty fall off, drawing the neighborhood's attention. Once it is established why Luther is trying to decorate his home, the neighbors come out in full force to help them.

The party starts strong, with Blair unaware of the earlier drama. Enrique thanks everyone for the warm welcome, and Nora thanks her neighbors for being a strong community. Luther, to everyone's disappointment, offers only a half-hearted toast. When Nora confronts Luther, he tries to persuade her to go on the cruise, but she refuses, disgusted that he is unhappy that Blair is home.

Having a change of heart, Luther slips out of the house, going across the street to the Scheels'. Bev's cancer, once in remission, has returned. Knowing this may be Walt and Bev’s last holiday together, Luther insists they take the cruise instead. With his holiday spirit renewed, Luther admits to Nora that skipping Christmas was not a good idea until she suggests they should do it next year.

== Cast ==
- Tim Allen as Luther Krank, Nora's husband
- Jamie Lee Curtis as Nora Krank, Luther's wife
- Dan Aykroyd as Vic Frohmeyer, the Kranks' domineering neighbor and the unofficial ward boss of the neighborhood
- Erik Per Sullivan as Spike Frohmeyer, Vic's son
- Cheech Marin as Officer Salino
- Jake Busey as Officer Treen, Salino's partner
- M. Emmet Walsh as Walt Scheel, the Kranks' obnoxious neighbor
- Kevin Chamberlin as Duke Scanlon, a Boy Scout leader
- Elizabeth Franz as Bev Scheel, Walt's ailing wife
- Rene Lavan as Enrique Decardenal, Blair's fiancé
- Austin Pendleton as Marty, an umbrella salesman who somehow knows everyone as he is actually Santa
- Caroline Rhea as Candi, a friend of Nora's
- Patrick Breen as Aubie, a stationier
- Felicity Huffman as Mary, a friend of Nora's
- Arden Myrin as Daisy
- Julie Gonzalo as Blair Krank, the Kranks' daughter
- Dava Hulsey as Amanda Frohmeyer, the doting wife of Vic and loving mother of Spike
- Tom Poston as Father Zabriskie, a priest
- Kim Rhodes as Julie, Luther's employee
- Vernee Watson-Johnson as Dox, Luther's employee
- John Short as Ned Becker, a neighbor of Luther and Nora's
- David Hornsby as Randy Becker, slacker son of Ned Becker, a neighbor of the Kranks
- Bonita Friedericy as Jude Becker, Ned’s wife
- Mark Christopher Lawrence as Wes Trogdon, another neighbor of Luther and Nora's
- Rachel L. Smith as Trish Trogdon, Wes's wife
- Dashle Reed as Wilber, the family dog
- David Lander as Tanning Intruder

== Production ==
=== Development ===
Joe Roth knew about John Grisham's Skipping Christmas before it was published in 2001. He was asked by Grisham to read the book in galley form, assuming he could direct a movie based on it. Roth recalls: "It turns out he was right. Even while I was reading it, all I could think was that this would make a great Christmas movie. It had humor, it had wonderful characters and it had heart." With the rights of the book received and the May 2000 founding of Revolution Studios, he stated that "as a start-up company, there was a great deal of work to do in order to get up and running."

Later, filmmaker Chris Columbus, who also bought the rights to Skipping Christmas and had written a screenplay, called Roth about directing the adaptation. As Roth explains: "Naturally, I thought he was going to direct it. But he said, 'No, you should direct it.' It turns out I was getting ready to direct another project. But when I read Chris's script, I knew I had to at least try to direct it. I promised myself that if I could get the right cast in place, I would do it." Producer Michael Barnathan said, "Joe read the script on a Sunday, bought it on Monday, decided he wanted to direct it on Tuesday and by Friday had cast Tim [Allen] and Jamie Lee [Curtis]. The following Monday morning we started pre-production."

=== Setting ===
Christmas with the Kranks takes place mostly in the Kranks' neighborhood of Hemlock Street in Riverside, a suburb of Chicago, Illinois, over the course of four weeks from Thanksgiving to Christmas Eve. Production designer Garreth Stover originally looked for locations with the right weather conditions and suburban ambiance for Hemlock Street, as described specifically in Columbus's script of the film. He was scouting from the metropolitan area of Chicago to Minnesota, but due to the extreme conditions of this part of the United States at the time, the filmmakers felt it was better to set up the neighborhood in an empty location instead of finding one.

When looking for a place to build the set 15 weeks before filming began, Stover chose a parking lot of a former Boeing aircraft factory in Downey, California, approximately 15 miles (24 km) away from downtown Los Angeles and in the midst of Downey Studios. The rest of the first three weeks were spent on designing the houses with assistance from construction coordinator David Elliott. In the next 12 weeks, hundreds of carpenters, plasterers, and painters had built what would become the largest exterior set ever for a movie, being more than 700 feet (210 m) long and including 16 houses. What Stover called "the core five" were the houses of the Kranks, the Frohmeyers, the Scheels, the Beckers, and the Trogdons, which he claimed had "full ground floors that are dressed and you can see into." He also said that the second floor of the Kranks' was built on a soundstage. Producer Michael Barnathan claimed that the set would later be available for other movies, television series and commercials to use. However, due to both health complaints from the locals over toxic residues and a lack of profit, the studio closed in 2012 and was razed to build a mall.

The scenes involving Nora Krank's excursion to the supermarket to procure a "Mel's Hickory Honey Ham" were filmed at Cordons Ranch Market, located at 2931 Honolulu Ave, Glendale, California.

=== Costumes ===
Susie DeSanto handled the costume design of Christmas with the Kranks. According to DeSanto, "I was looking for a project that was really textural, and maybe a bit nostalgic. I saw Christmas with the Kranks like a Christmas card, a beautiful Christmas memory of how we wish the holiday to be. So a lot of the fabrics I chose were not so much high-tech bright colors, but wools, plaids and mixing patterns. Joe [Roth] was specific about what he wanted, but within that, he allowed me a great deal of freedom to express myself. However, he did not have any input on the tan segment of the movie where Luthor and Nora Krank were wearing colourful underwear to look their best for the cruise."

DeSanto viewed that all the characters in Christmas with the Kranks would wear costumes that are supposed to serve as their "accents" rather than overtly defining them. Luther Krank is seen wearing the same-colored shirt and suit at work all the time, and according to DeSanto, this "tells that Luther's a punch-the-clock kind of guy, so the whole idea of skipping Christmas and going off on a tropical vacation is completely averse to anything he's ever done." She described Nora as "tasteful and kind of folksy, a middle-American woman approaching middle age. In our first meeting, Jamie Lee Curtis was totally prepared. She wanted to look like a real Midwestern woman who lives in the suburbs of Chicago and is as obsessed with Christmas as everyone around her. Nora dresses for the seasons and I found out by speaking to people at Marshall Field's in Chicago that the Christmas sweater is a big deal. And Jamie wears it so well." As for Vic Frohmeyer, she saw him as "a sort of commander-in-chief of the neighborhood, so I wanted something with a bit of a military flair. Since he's also a college professor, we cut the pattern from a general's jacket and made it professorial by using a vintage tweed mixed with corduroy."

=== Music ===
The soundtrack was produced and supervised by American musician Steven Van Zandt, who arranged and produced 6 of the tracks. It features many holiday standards, including "Jingle Bell Rock" by Brenda Lee; "Rudolph the Red-Nosed Reindeer" by Billy May & His Orchestra with vocal by Alvin Stoller; "I Saw Mommy Kissing Santa Claus" by Eddie Dunstedter; "White Christmas" by Dean Martin; "Frosty the Snowman" by Steve Van Zandt; "Blue Christmas" by Elvis Presley; and "The Christmas Song" by Ella Fitzgerald.

It received generally favorable reviews, with many critics appreciating the use of garage rock as a "fresh take" on Christmas music. Houston Press featured it on their list of top 10 Christmas movie soundtracks.

== Release ==
The film premiered theatrically in the United States on November 24, 2004, the day before Thanksgiving.

=== Home media ===
Christmas with the Kranks was released on DVD and VHS on March 8, 2005, by Columbia TriStar Home Entertainment, and on UMD Video for the PSP on November 8, 2005, by Sony Pictures Home Entertainment. It was released on November 14, 2005, in the United Kingdom on DVD and VHS. Sony later released the film on Blu-ray on November 16, 2021.

== Reception ==
=== Box office ===
Christmas with the Kranks was a moderate box-office success. On its opening weekend, it earned $21.6 million on 3,393 screens, ranking number three behind National Treasure and The Incredibles. It eventually grossed $96.6 million worldwide.

=== Critical response ===
On the review aggregator website Rotten Tomatoes, 5% of 134 critics' reviews are positive, with an average rating of 3.2/10. The website's consensus reads: "A mirthless movie as fresh as last year's fruit cake, Christmas with the Kranks is a coarse, garish comedy that promotes conformity." It is the second-worst reviewed Christmas movie on the site, behind The Nutcracker in 3D. On Metacritic, the film has a score of 22 out of 100 based on 33 critics, indicating "generally unfavorable" reviews. Audiences polled by CinemaScore gave the film an average grade of "B" on an A+ to F scale.

Roger Ebert gave the film one out of four stars, calling it "a holiday movie of stunning awfulness that gets even worse when it turns gooey at the end." Nell Minow of Common Sense Media gave the film 1/5 stars, writing: "The characters are unpleasant, the jokes are unfunny, and the sentiment is hypocritical -- so this movie is about as unappetizing as last year's figgy pudding." Stephen Hunter of The Washington Post wrote: "Christmas with the Kranks is a leaden whimsy so heavy it threatens to crash through the multiplex floor." Claudia Puig of USA Today wrote: "You will not want to spend Christmas, or any other day of the year, with the Kranks. Or, for that matter, in the company of their uncommonly nosy, self-righteous and meddling friends and neighbors."

Scott Foundas of Variety was more positive, calling it "an agreeable, if snowflake-thin stocking stuffer faithfully adapted from John Grisham's 2001 bestseller Skipping Christmas."

=== Retrospective assessment ===
In a retrospective review, Kayla Turner of Screen Rant heralded the film as an "underappreciated modern Christmas classic" and a "hilarious satire on the madness of societal Christmas expectations" that showcases an "artful blend of timely humor and a heartwarming messaging about the importance of connection over commercialism." Alex Maidy, writing for JoBlo.com in 2018, conceded that the film has a "thin" plot, but praised it for its elements of slapstick humor and performances, summarizing it as "over-the-top, silly, bizarre, cheesy, goofy, and sentimental."

== See also ==
- List of Christmas films

== Sources ==
- Bingen, Steven (2018). Hollywood's Lost Backlot: 40 Acres of Glamour and Mystery. Guildford, Connecticut: Lyons Press. ISBN 978-1-493-03362-1.
