= Don Zimmerman (film editor) =

American film editor (1944–2025)

- Born: June 15, 1944; Culver City, California, U.S.
- Died: July 24, 2025 (aged 81); Los Angeles, California, U.S.
- Other name: Big D
- Occupation: Film editor
- Spouse: Donna Zimmerman
- Children: 5, including Dan and Dean

Don Zimmerman (June 15, 1944 – July 24, 2025) was an American film editor.

His first job as lead editor was the film Coming Home, for which he was nominated for an Academy Award at the 51st Academy Awards.

== Early life ==
Zimmerman was born in Culver City, California, on June 15, 1944. He initially studied to become a veterinarian. He served in the Vietnam War, and later became a music editor. He moved into film editing after meeting director Hal Ashby, who was also an editor at the time.

== Career ==
Zimmerman began his career in 1969 as an apprentice editor in music and sound effects working for the Mirisch Co. on films such as The Hawaiians, Gaily, Gaily, Little Big Man, The Godfather, Where's Papa and Jonathan Livingston Seagull. He then became a picture assistant editor for director Hal Ashby on films such as The Landlord, Harold and Maude, Shampoo, and Being There. Zimmerman went on to work with director Hal Ashby on six films, including Coming Home, for which he received an Academy Award nomination.

In 1993, Zimmerman began working with director Tom Shadyac. Zimmerman went on to work with Shadyac on Ace Ventura: Pet Detective, The Nutty Professor, Patch Adams, and Liar Liar.

== Personal life and death ==
Zimmerman was married to Donna Zimmerman. The couple had five children, all of whom are in the film business: sons Dean, Danny and David are all film editors; Debi is a costumer; Dana works in post-production. Don died in Studio City of acute myeloid leukemia on July 24, 2025, at the age of 81.

== Filmography ==
Year	Film	Notes
1978	Coming Home	
1979	Being There	
1980	A Change of Seasons	
1982	Best Friends	
1982	Rocky III	
1982	Barbarosa	
1983	Staying Alive	
1984	Teachers	
1985	Rocky IV	
1985	My Man Adam	
1986	Cobra	
1987	Fatal Beauty	
1987	Over the Top	
1988	Everybody's All-American	
1989	The Package	
1990	Navy SEALs	
1991	The Prince of Tides	
1992	Diggstown	
1992	Leap of Faith	
1994	Ace Ventura: Pet Detective	
1994	The Scout	
1995	A Walk in the Clouds	
1996	The Nutty Professor	
1997	Liar Liar	
1998	Half Baked	
1998	Patch Adams	
1999	Brokedown Palace	Uncredited
1999	Galaxy Quest	
2002	Dragonfly	
2003	Just Married	
2003	The Cat in the Hat	
2004	Flight of the Phoenix	
2005	Fun with Dick and Jane	
2006	Night at the Museum	
2008	Jumper	
2009	Night at the Museum: Battle of the Smithsonian	
2010	Marmaduke	
2012	Men in Black 3	
2013	Red 2	
2020	Bill & Ted Face the Music	
