= Think Like a Dog =

- Film poster
- Directed by: Gil Junger
- Written by: Gil Junger
- Produced by: Cory Chen; Andrew Lazar; Linshu Zhang
- Starring: Megan Fox; Gabriel Bateman; Josh Duhamel; Kunal Nayyar; Todd Stashwick
- Cinematography: Giles Nuttgens
- Edited by: David S. Clark
- Music by: Jake Monaco
- Production companies: M-Star International; Mad Chance; 120dB Films; Ingenious Media
- Distributed by: Lionsgate
- Release date: June 9, 2020
- Running time: 91 minutes
- Country: United States
- Language: English
- Budget: $12.9 million

Think Like a Dog is a 2020 American science fiction comedy film written and directed by Gil Junger. It stars Josh Duhamel and Megan Fox. The film was released through Premium VOD on June 9, 2020.

== Plot ==
Oliver Reed is a 12-year-old technological prodigy who lives with his parents, Lukas and Ellen Reed, and his beloved dog, Henry. Oliver has a natural talent for science and spends much of his time inventing new technology. Although he has a supportive family and a close relationship with Henry, Oliver is somewhat insecure at school, particularly around Sophie, a classmate on whom he has a crush. Oliver prepares an ambitious experiment for his middle-school science fair involving technology designed to read minds. He hopes that the invention will prove his abilities, but the demonstration goes wrong after interference from a jealous school bully. The public failure humiliates Oliver, especially because Sophie witnesses it.

Rather than abandoning the project, Oliver decides to continue working on the invention. He receives assistance from his friend Xiao in China, with whom he communicates remotely about science and technology. Oliver conducts another experiment with the device at home. Once again, the experiment does not proceed according to plan, and Oliver and Henry are caught in the resulting electrical disturbance. Oliver initially believes that the experiment has simply failed again. Soon afterward, however, he begins hearing a voice despite apparently being alone. He eventually realizes that the voice belongs to Henry. The experiment has somehow established a telepathic connection between Oliver and his dog, allowing Oliver to hear Henry's thoughts.

Henry is equally surprised that Oliver can finally understand him. Although Oliver has always regarded Henry as his best friend, being able to communicate directly with him gives Oliver an entirely new understanding of his dog. Henry's thoughts reveal a straightforward canine philosophy centered on loyalty, affection, food, companionship, and enjoying life in the present. Oliver and Henry begin using their connection to deal with Oliver's everyday problems. Henry helps Oliver become more confident, including in his interactions with Sophie and the other students at school. Oliver, meanwhile, attempts to understand how his experiment produced the telepathic link and recognizes that he has accidentally created something far more significant than his original science-fair project.

At the same time, Oliver becomes increasingly worried about his parents. Lukas and Ellen's marriage has deteriorated, and their arguments lead Oliver to fear that they may separate. Oliver wants desperately to keep his family together. Henry helps him view the situation differently, encouraging him to recognize the importance of love, loyalty, and appreciating the people around him rather than trying to solve every problem purely through technology.

News of Oliver's technological breakthrough eventually attracts the attention of Mr. Mills, a famous and powerful technology entrepreneur. Mills becomes intensely interested in the implications of Oliver's invention and wants control of the technology. What began as an accidental discovery between a boy and his dog therefore becomes considerably more dangerous. Oliver also attracts the attention of government agents Callen and Munoz after Xiao hacked into Indium 6, an international communications satellite during their recent experiment. Olivers experiments and technological activities have raised concerns, particularly because of their potential implications for communications and security. Oliver consequently finds himself caught between adults who are interested in technology that he never intended to become a powerful commercial or governmental tool.

Mills's determination to obtain Oliver's invention escalates the situation. Oliver and Henry are soon abducted while on their way to the dance at Olivers school as part of his effort to gain control of his technology, placing both Oliver and Henry in danger. Henry manages to escape at Olivers behest and rallies the neighborhood dogs to rescue him. After the dogs subdue Mills, Henry encourages Oliver to go to the dance and put their plan of reconciling the latter’s parents into motion.

Oliver arrives at the school dance and succeeds in helping Lukas and Ellen reconcile with each other by playing their favorite song from their wedding. With his family reunited, Oliver comes to appreciate what Henry has been trying to teach him: humans often make life unnecessarily complicated. Mills arrives at the school and attempts to recapture Henry, but he escapes, and Callen and Munoz apprehend Mills before bringing Oliver and his parents in for questioning. As a result, Oliver is charged for cybertrespassing and sentenced to house arrest.

Two months into his house arrest, Callen and Munoz visit Oliver and his parents and inform him that their willing to waive his cybertrespassing charges in exchange for his services this summer, having been impressed with Olivers telepathic technology. Henry is also gifted with a new telepathic collar, allowing everyone to understand his thoughts, not just Oliver. In addition, Oliver will begin basic training in Hawaii, accompanied by his parents, thus setting his future path. The film ends with Oliver, his parents, and Henry embracing each other for this exciting trip, with Henry fully understanding that the best way to deal with human problems sometimes is to “think like a dog.”

== Cast ==
- Josh Duhamel as Lukas Reed
- Megan Fox as Ellen Reed
- Gabriel Bateman as Oliver Reed
- Kunal Nayyar as Mr. Mills
- Todd Stashwick as the voice of Henry
- Janet Montgomery as Bridget
- Julia Jones as Agent Munoz
- Bryan Callen as Agent Callen
- Hou Minghao as Xiao
- Izaac Wang as Li

== Production ==
It was announced in September 2016 that Gil Junger would be writing and directing the film, with Andrew Lazar producing.

No further announcements on the film were made until March 2018, with the castings of Megan Fox and Josh Duhamel. Filming began in New Orleans in May, with Gabriel Bateman, Janet Montgomery, Julia Jones, Kunal Nayyar and Bryan Callen added to the cast.

== Release ==
Think Like a Dog was released through Premium VOD by Lionsgate on June 9, 2020.

== Reception ==
As of October 2021, the film holds a 70% approval rating on Rotten Tomatoes, based on 10 reviews, with an average rating of 6.1/10.
