= Michael Barnathan =

American film producer

Michael Barnathan is an American film producer who has produced and executive-produced films such as Used People, The Help, the first three Harry Potter films, Rent, Cheaper by the Dozen and Night at the Museum. He was also a producer for the 2010 film adaptation Percy Jackson & the Olympians: The Lightning Thief and 2013 Percy Jackson: Sea of Monsters, based on the novels by Rick Riordan.

Barnathan graduated from Tisch School of the Arts of New York University in 1980.

Barnathan is Jewish.

== Filmography ==
=== Film ===
Producer

- Nine Months (1995)
- Jingle All the Way (1996)
- Stepmom (1998)
- Bicentennial Man (1999)
- Monkeybone (2001)
- Cheaper by the Dozen (2003)
- Christmas with the Kranks (2004)
- Rent (2005)
- Night at the Museum (2006)
- Night at the Museum: Battle of the Smithsonian (2009)
- I Love You, Beth Cooper (2009)
- Percy Jackson & the Olympians: The Lightning Thief (2010)
- The Help (2011)
- Percy Jackson: Sea of Monsters (2013)
- Pixels (2015)
- The Young Messiah (2016)
- I Kill Giants (2017)
- The Christmas Chronicles (2018)
- The Christmas Chronicles 2 (2020)

Executive producer

- Used People (1992)
- Harry Potter and the Philosopher's Stone (2001)
- Harry Potter and the Chamber of Secrets (2002)
- Harry Potter and the Prisoner of Azkaban (2004)
- Fantastic Four (2005)
- Fantastic Four: Rise of the Silver Surfer (2007)
- Night at the Museum: Secret of the Tomb (2014)
- Melody (TBA)

Miscellaneous crew

Year	Film	Role	Notes
1982	The Tragedy of King Lear	Production staff	Direct-to-video
1984	Mrs. Soffel	Assistant: Edgar Scherick	

Thanks

Year	Film	Role
2015	Parched	The producers wish to thank

=== Television ===
Year	Title	Credit	Notes
1986	On Wings of Eagles	Associate producer	
1987	Uncle Tom's Cabin	Executive producer	Television film
1988	Stranger on My Land		Television film
1988	Unholy Matrimony		Television film
1990	The Kennedys of Massachusetts	Executive producer	
2012	Applebaum	Consulting producer	Television film

Production manager

Year	Title	Role	Notes
1990	Anything to Survive	Executive in charge of production	Television film
1990	The Secret Life of Ian Fleming	Executive in charge of production	Television film
1990	The Girl Who Came Between Them	Executive in charge of production	Television film
