= Gabriel Bateman =

American actor (born 2004)

- Born: September 10, 2004 (age 22)
- Occupation: Actor
- Years active: 2012–present
- Relatives: Talitha Bateman (sister)

Gabriel Bateman (born September 10, 2004) is an American actor. He is best known for starring in numerous horror films, including as Robert in Annabelle (2014), Martin Wells in Lights Out (2016), Andy Barclay in Child's Play (2019), and Kyle Flynn in Unhinged (2020).

Bateman also had roles in family films, such as Carter Hughes in Benji (2018) and Oliver Reed in Think Like a Dog (2020). On television, he starred as Ethan Taylor in the CBS crime drama series Stalker (2014–2015) and Jack Hawthorne in the CBS mystery drama series American Gothic (2016).

== Early life, family and education ==
Bateman was raised in Turlock, California, but his family moved to southern California when he started his career in acting. His sisters are actress Talitha Bateman and Leah Bateman who is a singer and songwriter.

== Career ==
Bateman made his acting debut in 2012, appearing in the film George Biddle, CPA. In 2014, he had a supporting role as Robert in the supernatural horror film Annabelle, a spin-off of the acclaimed horror film The Conjuring. From 2014 to 2015, he starred as Ethan Taylor in the CBS drama thriller series Stalker.

In November 2014, he was cast in Robert Kirkman's Cinemax horror drama series Outcast. He appears in the series as Joshua Austin from 2016 to 2017.

In 2015, he had guest roles in various television series, including Your Family or Mine, Wicked City, and Code Black.

In 2016, Bateman played a leading role, alongside Teresa Palmer, in the supernatural horror film Lights Out, which was produced by James Wan. Also that year, he starred as Jack Hawthorne in the CBS mystery drama series American Gothic, which ran for one season. Alongside these roles, he also appeared in Jon Lajoie's music video for his one man band, Wolfie's Just Fine, Jon's first attempt at sincere music.

In 2018, he starred as Carter Hughes in the Netflix family comedy film Benji. He also starred as Wyatt McKenna in the Amazon Prime Video comedy drama series The Dangerous Book for Boys.

Bateman has been in commercials for Staples, Frigidaire, Energizer EcoAdvanced Recycled Batteries, Iams, and the Cadillac CTS Sedan. He also appeared in two music videos ("It's a Job" and "A New Beginning") for the album I Remembered But Then I Forgot by Wolfie's Just Fine, a folk music side project of Jon Lajoie.

In 2019, Bateman received further recognition for starring as Andy Barclay in the horror film Child's Play, alongside Aubrey Plaza. The film was a critical and commercial success. Also that year, he starred as Charlie Brenner in the musical adventure film Playmobil: The Movie and as Scott in the historical war film Robert the Bruce.

In 2020, he starred as Oliver Reed in the family film Think Like a Dog and as Kyle Hunter in the thriller film Unhinged, alongside Russell Crowe.

== Filmography ==
=== Film ===
| Year | Title | Role | Notes |
|---|---|---|---|
| 2012 | George Biddle, CPA | Kid of Many | |
| 2013 | The Park Bench | Boy | Short film |
| 2014 | Annabelle | Robert | |
| 2015 | Band of Robbers | Young Huck Finn | |
| 2015 | Checkmate | Christopher | |
| 2016 | Lights Out | Martin Wells | |
| 2018 | Benji | Carter Hughes | |
| 2018 | Saint Judy | Alex Wood | |
| 2019 | Child's Play | Andy Barclay | |
| 2019 | Playmobil: The Movie | Charlie Brenner | |
| 2019 | Robert the Bruce | Scott | |
| 2020 | Think Like a Dog | Oliver Reed | |
| 2020 | Unhinged | Kyle Flynn | |
| 2022 | The Fabelmans | Roger | |
| TBA | Above the Break | | |

=== Television ===
| Year | Title | Role | Notes |
|---|---|---|---|
| 2014 | Maker Shack Agency | Littlest Goth Kid | Episode: "Pilot" |
| 2014 | Grey's Anatomy | Jared Cole | Episode: "Throwing It All Away" |
| 2014 | Petals on the Wind | Michael | Television film |
| 2014–15 | Stalker | Ethan Taylor | 8 episodes |
| 2015 | Your Family or Mine | Jason Weston Jr. | 3 episodes |
| 2015 | Wicked City | Cooper Flynn | 2 episodes |
| 2015 | Code Black | Jason Riner | Episode: "Black Tag" |
| 2016 | American Gothic | Jack Hawthorne | 13 episodes |
| 2016 | Mamma Dallas | Tucker Cox | Television film |
| 2016–2017 | Outcast | Joshua Austin | 4 episodes |
| 2018 | The Dangerous Book for Boys | Wyatt McKenna | 6 episodes |
| 2021–23 | The Mosquito Coast | Charlie Fox | Series regular |
| 2021 | Just Beyond | Jack | 1 episode |
| 2022 | Reindeer in Here | Theo (voice) | Television special |
| TBA | Cipher | Asa | Television film |

=== Music videos ===
| Year | Title | Artist | Role | Notes |
|---|---|---|---|---|
| 2016 | "A New Beginning" | Wolfie's Just Fine | The Boy | |
| 2016 | "It's a Job" | Wolfie's Just Fine | The Boy | |
