= Clay Kaytis =

American animator and film director

- Born: March 22, 1973 (age 52); Orange County, California, U.S.
- Occupations: Animator, film director
- Years active: 1994–present
- Spouse: Monica Lago-Kaytis

Clay Kaytis (born March 22, 1973) is an American animator and film director, best known for directing the animated film The Angry Birds Movie (2016), the Christmas comedy film The Christmas Chronicles (2018), and the A Christmas Story sequel A Christmas Story Christmas (2022).

== Career ==
Kaytis started his career as an animator at the Walt Disney Animation Studios. His main credits at Disney included Tangled, Wreck-It Ralph, and Frozen. After working for nineteen years, he left the studio in 2013.

Kaytis made his directing debut with The Angry Birds Movie, which he co-directed with Fergal Reilly for Sony Pictures Entertainment. The film was based on the Rovio Entertainment's video game Angry Birds. Jon Vitti wrote the screenplay for the film, which was released on May 20, 2016. Kaytis then made his live-action directing debut with The Christmas Chronicles for Netflix, which was released on November 22, 2018.

In late September 2016, it was announced that Kaytis will direct The Lunch Witch for Amblin Partners.

In 2022, Kaytis directed a sequel to the 1983 film A Christmas Story entitled A Christmas Story Christmas for Warner Bros. Pictures, Legendary Pictures, and HBO Max.

== Personal life ==
Kaytis is married to producer Monica Lago-Kaytis.

== Filmography ==
Year	Title	Credits	Characters
1995	Pocahontas	Inbetween Artist: Additional Clean-Up Animation	
1996	The Hunchback of Notre Dame	Breakdown Animator	Clopin
1997	Hercules	Rough Inbetweener	
1998	Mulan	Rough Inbetweener	
1999	Tarzan	Additional Rough Inbetweener	
2000	Fantasia 2000	Animating Assistant	
2000	The Emperor's New Groove	Animator	Pacha
2002	Treasure Planet	Animator	Scroop
2004	Home on the Range	Animator	Farm Animals
2005	Chicken Little	Animator	Buck "Ace" Cluck
2007	Meet the Robinsons	Animator	
2008	Bolt	Supervising Animator	
2009	Super Rhino (Video short)	Animator	
2010	Made in Hollywood: Teen Edition (TV Series)	Voice	
2010	Tangled	Animation Supervisor	
2012	Tangled Ever After (Short)	Animation Supervisor	
2012	Paperman (Short)	Final Line Animator	
2012	Wreck-It Ralph	Animator / End Credit Animation Designer	
2013	Get a Horse! (Short)	Additional Thanks	
2013	Frozen	Animator	
2016	The Angry Birds Movie	Director with Fergal Reilly/ Voice	Clayton the Waiter Bird
2018	The Christmas Chronicles	Director	
2020	The Christmas Chronicles 2	Executive producer	
2021	Snoopy Presents: For Auld Lang Syne (TV Special)	Director / Writer with Alex Galatis and Scott Montgomery	
2022	Snoopy Presents: It's the Small Things, Charlie Brown (TV Special)	Creative Consultant	
2022	Snoopy Presents: To Mom (and Dad), With Love (TV Special)	Director	
2022	Snoopy Presents: Lucy's School (TV Special)	Creative Consultant	
2022	A Christmas Story Christmas	Director / Screenplay with Nick Schenk	
