= Nathan (given name) =

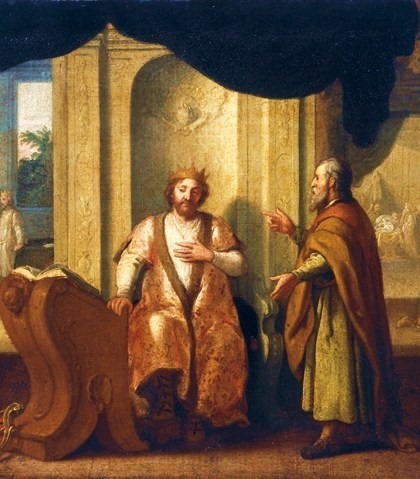
- Nathan the Prophet (right) advising king David (center)
- Pronunciation: /ˈneɪθən/ NAY-thǝn
- Gender: Male
- Language: Hebrew

Origin
- Origin: Israel
- Meaning: "gift from God"

Other names
- Nicknames: Nate; Nat; Tate
- Related names: Jonathan; Natan; Nathanael; Nathaniel; Nethaniah; Netanyahu

Nathan is a masculine given name. It is derived from the Hebrew verb נָתָן meaning gave (standard Hebrew Natan, Yiddish Nussen/Nosson, Tiberian Hebrew Nāṯān).

== Notable people with this name ==
- Nathan Adams (born 1991), English footballer
- Nathan Adrian (born 1988), American swimmer
- Nathan Agostinelli (1930–2024), American politician
- Nathan Aké (born 1995), Dutch footballer
- Nathan Allen (born 1813), American physician
- Nathan Alterman (1910–1970), Israeli poet, journalist, and translator
- Nathan Amos (born 1979), South African born-Israeli rugby player
- Nathan Anderson, American Hindenburg Research founder
- Nathan Aspinall (born 1991), English professional darts player
- Nathan Aspinall (ice hockey) (born 2006), Canadian ice hockey player
- Nathan Astle (born 1971), New Zealand cricketer
- Nathan Azarcon, Filipino bass player and nationalist
- Nathan L. Bachman (1878–1937), American judge and politician
- Nathan Badeen (died 1776), Syrian American soldier
- Nathan Bailey (died 1742), British lexicographer and philologist
- Nathan Bailey (born 1993), British trampoline gymnast
- Nathan Baker (born 1991), English footballer
- Nathan Ballard, American political strategist and attorney
- Nathan Barksdale (1961–2016), American drug dealer
- Nathan Barnatt (born 1981), American actor and comedian
- Nathan Barr (born 1973), American film and television composer and musician
- Nathan Bartholomay (born 1989), American pair skater
- Nathan Baskind (1916–1944), Jewish-American World War II soldier
- Nathan Baxter (born 1998), English footballer
- Nathan Beaulieu (born 1992), Canadian ice hockey player
- Nathan Beauregard (1890s–1970), American musician
- Nathan Berg, Canadian opera singer
- Nathan Biah (born 1971), American politician
- Nathan Birnbaum (1864–1937), Austrian journalist and Jewish philosopher
- Nathan Bishop (born 1999), English footballer
- Nathan Bishop (1808–1880), American educator and philanthropist
- Nathan Bittle (born 2003), American basketball player
- Nathan Bitumazala (born 2002), French footballer
- Nathan Bock (born 1983), Australian rules footballer
- Nathan Bom (born 1980), Bawm politician and militant leader
- Nathan Boone (1780–1856), American soldier and son of Daniel Boone
- Nathan Boothe (born 1994), American professional basketball player
- Nathan Bor (1913–1972), American boxer
- Nathan Bostock (born 1960), British banker
- Nathan Bourdeau (born 1990), American soccer player
- Nathan Bowden (born 1993), Australian rower
- Nathan Boya (1924–2022), American who went over Niagara Falls
- Nathan Boyle (born 1994), Northern Irish footballer
- Nathan Boyles, American politician
- Nathan Bracken (born 1977), Australian cricketer
- Nathan Braniff, Northern Irish actor
- Nathan Broad (born 1993), Australian rules footballer
- Nathan Broadhead (born 1998), Welsh footballer
- Nathan Broome (born 2002), English footballer
- Nathan Brown (disambiguation), multiple people
- Nathan Bruckenthal (1979–2004), United States Coast Guardsman
- Nathan Bryon (born 1991), British actor and author
- Nathan Buckley (born 1972), Australian rules footballer
- Nathan Buddle (born 1993), English footballer
- Nathan Burgers (born 1979), Australian professional field hockey goalkeeper
- Nathan Burke (born 1970), Australian rules footballer
- Nathan Burns (born 1988), Australian soccer player
- Nathan Burrage (born 1971), Australian writer
- Nathan Burton (born 1980), American football player and coach
- Nathan Butler-Oyedeji (born 2003), English footballer
- Nathan Buttke (born 1975), American racing driver
- Nathan Buzza (born 1970), Australian businessman
- Nathan Byanyima (born 1956), Ugandan politician
- Nathan Byrd (born 2000), American racing driver
- Nathan Byrne (born 1992), English footballer
- Nathan Byukusenge (born 1980), Rwandan cyclist
- Nathan Camargo (born 2005), Brazilian footballer
- Nathan Cameron (born 1991), English footballer
- Nathan Carter (born 1990), Irish country singer
- Nathan Carter (born 2002), American football player
- Nathan Keonaona Chai, American novelist
- Nathan Chen (born 1999), American figure skater
- Nathan Clark (1718–1792), American politician
- Nathan Clarke (born 1983), English footballer
- Nathan Clarke (born 1979), Australian rules footballer
- Nathan Clarke, British actor and voice actor
- Nathan Cleary (born 1997), Australian rugby league player
- Nathan Cleverly (born 1987), Welsh boxer
- Nathan Coe (born 1984), Australian soccer player
- Nathan Cofnas (born 1987), American philosopher
- Nathan Cohen (1923–1971), Canadian theatre critic and broadcaster
- Nathan Cohen (born 1986), New Zealand rower
- Nathan Collins (born 2001), Irish footballer
- Nathan Daniel Beau Connolly (born 1977), American historian, professor, and podcaster
- Nathan Connolly (born 1981), Northern Irish guitarist
- Nathan Cooper (disambiguation), multiple people
- Nathan Coulter-Nile (born 1987), Australian cricketer
- Nathan Cottrell (born 1996), American football player
- Nathan Daboll (1750–1818), American mathematician
- Nathan Daboll (1780–1863), American politician
- Nathan Dahm (born 1983), American politician
- Nathan Dane (1752–1835), American politician
- Nathan Darrow (born 1976 or 1977), American actor
- Nathan Daschle (born 1973), American political strategist
- Nathan Matthew David, American film score composer
- Nathan Davis (disambiguation), multiple people
- Nathan Dawe (born 1994), English DJ and record producer
- Nathan Deakes (born 1977), Australian race walker
- Nathan Deal (born 1942), American politician
- Nathan Dean (1934–2013), American politician
- Nathan December, American musician
- Nathan Decron (born 1998), French rugby union player
- Nathan Dekoke (born 1996), French footballer
- Nathan Delfouneso (born 1991), English footballer
- Nathan Dempsey (born 1974), Canadian ice hockey player
- Nathan Divinsky (1925–2012), Canadian mathematician, professor, chess master, writer and politician
- Nathan Dixon (disambiguation), multiple people
- Nathan Dlamini (born 2007), English footballer
- Nathan Doak (born 2001), Irish rugby union player
- Nathan Dossantos (born 1999), Canadian soccer player
- Nathan Dougherty (1886–1977), American athlete, coach, and educator
- Nathan Douglas (born 1982), English triple jumper
- Nathan Downer, Canadian television journalist
- Nathan Doyle (born 1987), English association football player
- Nathan Drake (essayist) (1766–1836), English essayist and writer on Shakespeare
- Nathan Drake (artist) (c. 1728–1778), English artist
- Nathan Drummond (born 1995), Australian rules footballer
- Nathan Dudley (1825–1910), American colonel
- Nathan Dumelow (born 1981), English cricketer
- Nathan Dunfield (born 1975), American mathematician
- Nathan Dunn (1782–1844), American businessman, philanthropist and sinologist
- Nathan Dyer (born 1987), English footballer
- Nathan Earle (rugby union) (born 1994), English professional rugby union footballer
- Nathan Earle (cyclist) (born 1988), Australian cyclist
- Nathan East (born 1955), American bass player and vocalist
- Nate Ebner (born 1988), American football player and rugby Olympian
- Nathan Eccleston (born 1990), English footballer
- Nathan Eckstein (1873–1945), American businessman
- Nathan Eddy, American documentary filmmaker, journalist, and cultural heritage activist
- Nathan Edmondson, American writer
- Nathan Edward (born 2005), West Indian cricketer
- Nathan Efron (born 1954), Australian optometrist
- Nathan Eglington (born 1980), Australian field hockey player
- Nathan Elasi (born 1989), Australian footballer
- Nathan Elbaz (1932–1954), Israel Defense Force soldier
- Nathan Elder (born 1985), English footballer
- Nathan Ellington (born 1981), English footballer
- Nathan Ellis (born 1994), Australian cricketer
- Nathan Enderle (born 1988), American gridiron football player
- Nathan Englander (born 1970), American short story writer and novelist
- Nathan Eovaldi (born 1990), American baseball player
- Nathan Ephraums (born 1999), Australian field hockey player
- Nathan Erasmus (born 1961), South African judge
- Nathan Evans (disambiguation), several people
- Nathan Eyres-Brown (born 1989), Australian rugby union footballer
- Nathan Fagan-Gayle (born 1986), British musician known as Nathan
- Nathan Fernandes (born 2005), Brazilian footballer
- Nathan Feuerstein (born 1991), American rapper, known by his stage name NF
- Nathan Fielder (born 1983), Canadian comedian and host
- Nathan Fillion (born 1971), Canadian actor
- Nathan Fong (1959–2020), Canadian chef
- Nathan Bedford Forrest (1821–1877), American Civil War general
- Nathan Fraser (born 2005), Irish footballer
- Nathan Frazer (born 1998), British professional wrestler
- Nate Freiman (born 1986), American baseball player
- Nathan Gamble (born 1998), American actor
- Nathan Michael Gelber (1891–1966), Austrian-Israeli historian
- Nathan Gerry (born 1995), American football player
- Nathan Glantz, American jazz bandleader
- Nathan Goff, Jr. (1843–1920), American politician
- Nathan Gorman (born 1996), British boxer
- Nathan Green (disambiguation), multiple people
- Nathan Greene (c. 1902–1964), American lawyer
- Nathan S. Greene (1810–1900), American businessman and politician
- Nathan Gunn (born 1970), American opera singer
- Nathan Haines (born 1972), New Zealand-born producer, vocalist, and saxophonist
- Nathan Hale (1755–1776), American patriot serving as a spy during the American Revolution
- Nathan K. Hall (1810–1874), American judge
- Nathan Handwerker (1891–1974), Polish-American businessman
- Nathan Hartono (born 1991), Singaporean-Indonesian singer-songwriter
- Nathan Hauritz (born 1981), Australian cricketer
- Nathan Heaney (born 1989), English boxer
- Nathan Hendricks (born 2005), South African Paralympic swimmer
- Nathan Henry, British reality TV personality
- Nathan Hill (born 1975), American fiction writer
- Nathan W. Hill (born 1979), American linguist and Tibetologist
- Nathan Jackson (disambiguation), multiple people
- Nate James (disambiguation), multiple people
- Nathan Jason (born 2002), Australian para-athlete
- Nathan Jawai (born 1986), Australian basketball player
- Nathan Johnson (disambiguation), multiple people
- Nathan Leigh Jones, Australian musician and speaker
- Nathan Jonas "Joey" Jordison (1975–2021), American drummer
- Nathan Jones (disambiguation), multiple people
  - Nathan Jones (born 1970), Australian professional wrestler
- Nathan Jung (1946–2021), American actor and stuntman
- Nathan Kabasele (born 1994), Belgian footballer
- Nathan Kahan (born 1971), Belgian middle-distance runner
- Nathan Kahane, American film producer
- Nathan Kaplan (1891–1923), American mobster
- Nathan J. Kaplan (1910–1997), American lawyer, politician, and jurist
- Nathan O. Kaplan (1917–1986), American biochemist
- Nathan Katz (poet) (1892–1981), Jewish Alsatian poet
- Nathan Katz (judoka) (born 1995), Australian Olympic judoka
- Nathan Katz (professor), American academic
- Nathan Kelley (1808–1871), American architect
- Nathan Kemp (born 1979), New Zealand professional rugby union player
- Nathan E. Kendall (1868–1936), American politician
- Nathan Kenny, New Zealand evolutionary‐genomics researcher
- Nathan Kerr (born 1998), Northern Irish footballer
- Nathan Ketilsson (1792–1828), Icelandic physician
- Nathan Keyes (born 1985), American actor
- Nathan Keyfitz (1913–2010), Canadian demographer
- Nathan Kiley (born 1981), English stage actor
- Nathan Kimball (1822–1898), American politician
- Nathan Kimsey (born 1993), English professional golfer
- Nathan King (disambiguation), multiple people
- Nathan Kirby (born 1993), American baseball player
- Nathan Kirsh (born 1932), Swazi and South African billionaire
- Nathan Knight (born 1997), American basketball player
- Nathan Knorr (1905–1977), American Christian minister
- Nathan Knox (born 1981), New Zealand footballer
- Nathan Kogan (1926–2013), American psychologist
- Nathan Konstandopoulos (born 1996), Australian footballer
- Nathan Koo-Boothe (born 1985), English-Jamaican footballer
- Nathan Koranteng (born 1992), English footballer
- Nathan Korn (1893–1941), American architect and builder
- Nathan Kornblum (1914–1993), American chemist
- Nathan Krakouer (born 1988), Australian rules footballer
- Nathan Kress (born 1992), American actor
- Nathan Kreuger (born 1999), Australian rules football player
- Nathan Kupperman, American pediatrician
- Nathan Kuta (born 2000), Belgian-Dutch basketball player
- Nathan Lane (born 1956), American actor
- Nathan Larson (born 1970), American film music composer
- Nathan Larson (1980–2022), American white supremacist and convicted felon
- Nathan Law (born 1993), Hong Kong politician
- Nathan Lawrence, American actor
- Nathan Lawson (born 1983), Canadian ice hockey player
- Nathan Longpre (born 1988), Canadian professional ice hockey player
- Nathan Lopez (born 1991), Filipino actor
- Nathan Lowe (born 2005), English footballer
- Nathan Lukes (born 1994), American baseball player
- Nathan Lyon (born 1987), Australian cricketer
- Nathan Lyons (1930–2016), American photographer, curator and educator
- Nate Mack (1891–1965), Polish-born American banker; co-founder of the Bank of Las Vegas
- Nathan MacKinnon (born 1995), Canadian ice hockey player
- Nathan Ross Margold (1899–1947), Romanian-American lawyer
- Nathan Martorella (born 2001), American baseball player
- Nathan Mavila (born 1995), English footballer
- Nathan McCall (born 1955), American author
- Nate McLouth (born 1981), American baseball player
- Nathan Mensah (born 1998), Ghanaian basketball player
- Nathan Merritt (born 1982), Australian rugby player
- Nathan Méténier (born 1999), French climate activist
- Nathan Mileikowsky (1879–1935), Russian Zionist political activist
- Nathan Militzok (1923–2009), American basketball player
- Nathan Miller (disambiguation), multiple people
- Nathan L. Miller (1868–1953), American politician
- Nathan Milstein (1903–1992), Ukrainian-American violinist
- Nathan Mitchell (born 1988), Canadian actor
- Nathan Myhrvold (born 1959), former Chief Technology Officer at Microsoft
- Nathan Page (born 1971), Australian actor
- Nathan Pare (born 2005), American snowboarder
- Nathan Parker (1904–1991), American football player
- Nathan Parker, English screenwriter
- Nathan Parsons (born 1988), American actor
- Nathan Peats (born 1990), Australian rugby player
- Nathan Perkovich (born 1985), American professional ice hockey player
- Nathan Peterman (born 1994), American football player
- Nathan Phillips (disambiguation), multiple people
- Nathan Pickering (born 2000), American football player
- Nathan Post (1881–1938), 7th and 10th Governor of American Samoa
- Nathan Roberts (born 1986), Australian volleyball player
- Nathan Robertson (born 1977), English badminton player
- Nathan Robinson (disambiguation), several people
- Nathan Rosen (1909–1995), American-Israeli theoretical physicist
- Nathan Ross, American film and television producer
- Nathan Ross (born 1988), Australian rugby league player
- Nathan Ross (born 1976), Australian rugby union player
- Nathan Mayer Rothschild (1777–1836), German Jewish banker
- Nathan Rourke (born 1998), Canadian gridiron football player
- Nate Saint (1923–1956), American missionary pilot
- Nathan Santos (born 2001), Brazilian footballer
- Nathan Seiberg (born 1956), Israeli theoretical physicist
- Nathan Shepherd (born 1993), Canadian-American football player
- Nate Silver (born 1978), American statistician and writer
- Nathan Sivin (1931–2022), American sinologist and historian of Chinese science
- Nathan Smith (disambiguation), multiple people
- Nathan Soltz (born c.1977), American politician
- Nathan Stewart-Jarrett (born 1985), British actor
- Nathan Sykes (born 1974), English rugby player
- Nathan James Sykes (born 1993), English singer, songwriter and record producer
- Nathan Eldon Tanner (1898–1982), Canadian politician and Mormon religious leader
- Nathan Taylor (disambiguation), multiple people
- Nate Teut (born 1976), American baseball player
- Nathan Thomas (disambiguation), multiple people
- Nathan Tjoe-A-On (born 2001), Indonesian footballer
- Nathan Trent (born 1992), Austrian singer
- Nathan Trupp (born 1947), American serial killer
- Nathan Voorhis (born 2004), American football player
- Nathan Wadsworth, American politician
- Nathan Walker (born 1994), Welsh-born Australian ice hockey player
- Nathan Ward (born 1981), Canadian ice hockey player
- Nathan Ward (1804–1860), American physician and missionary
- Nathan Witt (1903–1982), American lawyer
- Nathan Wood (disambiguation) (multiple people)
- Nathan Wright (1654–1721), English judge
- Nathan Wright (born 1994), Australian rules footballer
- Nathan Wright (born 1979), British actor
- Nathan Yau, American statistician and data visualization expert
- Nathan Yellin-Mor (1913–1980), Israeli politician
- Nathan Young (born 2002), Canadian curler
- Nathan Young-Coombes (born 2003), English footballer
- Nathan Youngblood (born 1954), Native American potter
- Nathan Zach (1930–2020), Israeli poet
- Nathan Zézé (born 2005), French footballer
- Nathan Zohoré (born 2000), French footballer
- Nathan Zsombor-Murray (born 2003), Canadian diver
- Nathan Zuntz (1847–1920), German physiologist
- Nathan Zuzga (born 1985), American soccer player

== Fictional characters ==
- Big Nate, eponymous comic strip character
- Nate Ben, an side character in the Backrooms
- Nate the Great, eponymous protagonist of the book series by Marjorie W. Sharmat
- Nathan, a character from South Park
- Nathan the Wise, eponymous protagonist in the 1779 play by Gotthold Ephraim Lessing
- Nathan Bitner, a character in the Masters of the Universe franchise
- Nathan Detroit, from the stage musical Guys and Dolls, played by Frank Sinatra in the film adaptation
- Nathan Drake, protagonist of the Uncharted video games
- Nathan Explosion, a character in the cartoon series Metalocalypse
- Nathan "Nate" Ford, the main character in the TV series Leverage
- Nathan Never, eponymous protagonist of the Italian science fiction comic book
- Nathan Petrelli, a character in the NBC science fiction series Heroes
- Nathan Prescott, antagonist of the Life Is Strange video games
- Nathan Roberts, a character in the Australian soap opera, Home and Away
- Nathan Sallery, a character in the British soap opera Doctors
- Nathan Scott, a character in the television series One Tree Hill
- Nathan Sears, a character in the Final Destination 5
- Nathan Stark, a character in the television series Eureka
- Nathan Summers, a Marvel Comic Book character who is a mutant and Super-Hero from the X-Men and X-Force
- Nathan Williams, a character in the British Soap opera EastEnders
- Nathan Young character from the British Channel 4 science fiction comedy-drama Misfits
- Nathan Zuckerman, narrator or protagonist in many of Philip Roth's works of fiction

== See also ==
- Nathan (disambiguation)
- Nathan (surname)
- Natan, a given name and surname
- Nate (given name)
- Nathaniel
- Jonathan (name)
