= Nathanael =

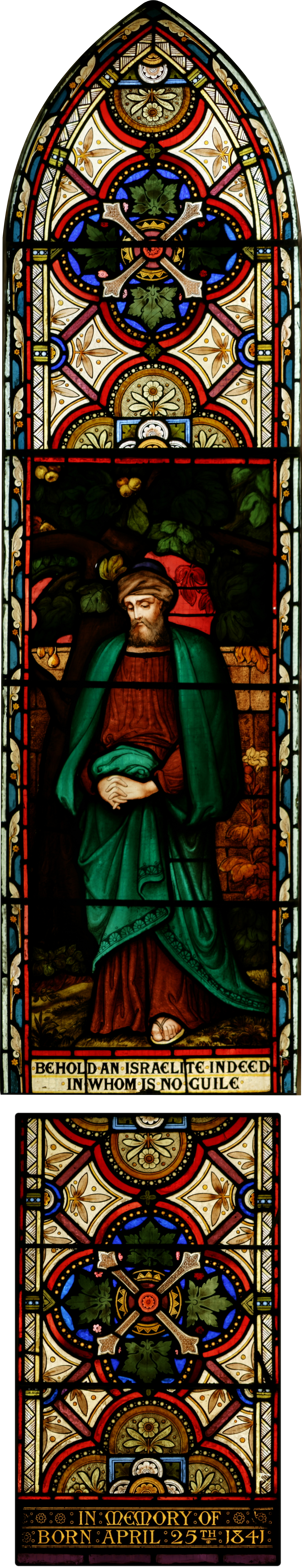
- The biblical Nathanael depicted in stained glass.
- Pronunciation: /nəˈθæniəl/
- Gender: Masculine

Origin
- Origin: Hebrew
- Meaning: "God has given" or "Gift of God"

Other names
- Nicknames: Nat, Nate
- Related names: Jonathan, Nathan, Nathaniel, Elnathan

Nathanael (Greek: Ναθαναήλ, Hebrew: נְתַנְאֵל, romanized: natan'el, lit. 'given by God') is an English name of Hebrew origin. It is of Biblical origin and holds significance for Jews and Christians. Several figures in both the Old and New Testament bear the name. Figures in the Old Testament, which is transliterated from Hebrew, have their names rendered as Nethanel in English whereas those in the New Testament, which is translated from Greek, have theirs rendered as Nathanael. Since the early 20th century, the most common English spelling is Nathaniel, a change likely influenced by the popularity of other Biblical names ending in -iel (e.g. Daniel, Gabriel, Uriel). Bearers may use the nicknames Nate or Nathan. The name and its derivatives may appear in patronymic surnames such as Nathanson and Barnathan.

== Appearances in the Bible ==
- Nethanel ben Zuar; that is, the son of Zuar, chief of the tribe of Issachar and one of the leaders of the tribes of Israel during the Exodus (Numbers 1:8; 2:5, 7:18, 23; 10:15).
- Nethanel ben Jesse (1 Chronicles 2:14); one of David's brothers
- A priest who blew the trumpet before the ark when it was brought up to Jerusalem (1 Chr. 15:24).
- A Levite (1 Chr. 24:6).
- A temple porter, of the family of the Korhites (1 Chr. 26:4).
- One of the "princes" appointed by Jehoshaphat to teach the law through the cities of Judah (2 Chr. 17:7).
- A chief Levite in the time of Josiah (2 Chr. 35:9).
- A son of Passhur, one of the biblical priests who had taken a pagan wife but repented according to Ezra 10:22.
- Neh. 12:21.
- A priest's son who bore a trumpet at the dedication of the walls of Jerusalem (Neh. 12:36).
- Nathanael of Cana (Gospel of John)

== Notable people named Nathanael ==
- Nathanael Ball (1623–1681), an English clergyman
- Nathanael Barnes (born 1987), an Australian rugby league footballer
- Nathanael Burwash (1839–1918), a Canadian methodist, minister and university administrator
- Nathanael Carpenter (1589 – c. 1628), an English author, philosopher, and geographer
- Nathanael Chalmers (1830–1910), a New Zealand pastoralist, explorer, politician, planter, sugar miller, and magistrate
- Nathanael Diesel (1692–1745), a Danish composer
- Nathanael Emmons (1745–1840), an American congregational minister
- Nathanael Fouquet (born 1972), a French slalom canoeist
- Nathanael Gray, a professor of biological chemistry and molecular pharmacology at Harvard Medical School
- Nathanael Greene (1742–1786), Major General of the Continental Army in the American Revolutionary War
- August Nathanael Grischow (1726–1760), a German mathematician and astronomer
- Nathanael Greene Herreshoff (1848–1938), American naval architect
- Nathanael Jones (c. 1624 – 1683), a Welsh gentleman-poet
- Nathanael Gottfried Leske (1751–1786), a German scientist and geologist
- Johann Nathanael Lieberkühn (1711–1756), a German Physician
- Nathanael Liminski (born 1985), a German politician
- Nathanael Matthaeus von Wolf (1724–1784), a German botanist, physician and astronomer
- Nathanael Mbourou (born 1996), a Gabonese professional footballer
- Nathanael Ogbeta (born 2001), an English footballer
- Nathanael of Ohrid (1820–1906), a Bulgarian cleric, writer and revolutionary from Macedonia
- Nathanael Orr (1917–2016), an Australian politician
- Nathanael G. Pendleton (1793–1861), an American politician
- Nathanael Pringsheim (1823–1894), a German botanist
- Nathanael Richards (1630–1654), an English dramatist
- Nathanael Saleh (born 2006), an English actor
- Nathanael Salmon (1675–1742), an English antiquary
- Nathanaël (born Nathalie Stephens, 1970), Canadian writer and translator
- Nathanael Villanueva (born 1995), a Filipino footballer
- Nathanael West (1903–1940), American writer
- Nathanael Wiseman, an entrepreneur and founder and CEO of Award-winning production company Redeeming Features

== People with the name Nathanial ==
- Nathanial Saltonstall (c. 1639 – 1707), American judge

== See also ==
- Nathaniel
- Natanael (given name)
- Nathan (given name)
- Nate (given name)
- Nethaneel
- Netanyahu (surname)
