= Nathaniel =

- Pronunciation: /nəˈθæniəl/
- Gender: Masculine
- Language: English

Origin
- Origin: Hebrew
- Meaning: see Nathanael

Other names
- Nicknames: Nat; Nate; Nathan; Nath
- Related names: Jonathan; Nathan (given name); Nathan (surname); Nathanael

Nathaniel is an English variant of the biblical Hebrew name Nathanael. It can be a given or surname.

== Given name ==
- Nathaniel Archibald (1952–2018), American basketball player
- Nate Archibald (born 1948), American basketball player
- Nathaniel Ayers (born 1951), American musician who is the subject of the 2009 film The Soloist
- Nathaniel Bacon (1647–1676), Virginia colonist who instigated Bacon's Rebellion
- Nathaniel P. Banks (1816–1894), American politician and American Civil War General
- Nat Bates (born 1931), two-term mayor of Richmond, California
- Nathaniel Bowditch (1773–1838), American mathematician, father of modern maritime navigation
- Nathaniel Buzolic (born 1983), Australian actor
- Nathaniel Chalobah (born 1994), English footballer
- Nathaniel Clayton (1833–1895), British politician
- Nat King Cole (1919–1965), American singer and musician
- Nathaniel Clyne (born 1991), English footballer
- Nathaniel Dass, English actor and musician
- Nathaniel W. Depee (1812–1868), American abolitionist
- Robert Nathaniel Dett (1882–1943), American composer and choir director
- Nathaniel Erskine-Smith (born 1984), Canadian politician
- Nathaniel Fick (born 1977), former US Marine captain
- Nathaniel Greene Foster (1809–1869), American politician and military officer
- Nathaniel M. Gorton (born 1938), American federal judge
- Nathaniel Everett Green (1823–1899), English painter
- Nathaniel Greene (journalist) (1797–1877), American journalist
- Nathaniel Hackett (born 1979), American football coach
- Nathaniel Hawthorne (1804–1864), American novelist
- Nathaniel J. Jacobson (1916–1996), American artist
- Nathaniel Jarvis (born 1991), Welsh footballer
- Nathaniel Bar-Jonah (1957–2008), convicted kidnapper, suspected serial killer and cannibal
- Nathaniel Lammons (born 1993), American tennis player
- Nathaniel Ledbetter (born c. 1961), American politician
- Nathaniel Lee, (c. 1653–1692), English dramatist
- Nathaniel Lees, New Zealand actor
- Nathaniel Lindley, Baron Lindley (1828–1921), English judge
- Nat Lofthouse (1925–2011), English footballer
- Nathaniel Lubell (1916–2006), American Olympic fencer
- Nathaniel Lyon (1818–1861), U.S. Army general
- Nathaniel Macon (1757–1837), speaker of the House of Representatives
- Nathaniel Miller (born 1979), Canadian water polo player
- Nathaniel Moore (disambiguation), various people
- Nathaniel Morris, American political candidate
- Nathaniel Neale (born 1988), New Zealand Rugby League player
- Nathaniel Parker (born 1962), English actor
- Nathaniel Pearce (1779–1820), English explorer in Ethiopia
- Nathaniel Pearlman (born 1965), American entrepreneur
- Nathaniel Peat, British Jamaican social entrepreneur
- Nathaniel Peteru (born 1992), New Zealand rugby league footballer
- Nathaniel Philbrick (born 1956), American writer
- Nathaniel Phillips (born 1997), English footballer
- Nathaniel Rateliff (born 1978), American musician
- Nathaniel "Nate" Rathbun (born 1992), American house musician known as Audien
- Nathaniel Raymond (born 1977), human rights investigator and anti-torture advocate
- Nathaniel Ropes (c. 1726–1774), justice of the Massachusetts Supreme Judicial Court
- Nate Ruess (born 1982), American singer-songwriter
- Nate Silver (born 1978), an American statistician, political analyst, author, sports gambler, and poker player
- Nathaniel Stern (born 1977), American artist
- Nathaniel Walter Swan (1834–1884), Irish-born Australian writer
- Nathaniel B. Terpeny (1809–1884), American politician from New York
- Nate Thurmond (1941–2016), an American basketball player
- Nathaniel Beverley Tucker (1784–1851), American author and Virginia political activist
- Nathaniel Wallich (1786–1854), surgeon and botanist
- Nathaniel Watson (born 2000), American football player
- Nathaniel Jarrett Webb (1891–1943), American politician
- Nathaniel White (born 1960), American serial killer
- Nathaniel Willemse (born 1985), Australian singer-songwriter
- Nat Wolff (born 1994), American actor, musician and singer-songwriter

== Surname ==
- A. S. Nathaniel (????–2013), Pakistani nurse
- Afia Nathaniel (born 1974), Pakistani filmmaker
- Ashley Nathaniel-George (born 1995), English footballer
- Daniel Nathaniel (born 1992), Nigerian Men volleyball player
- Ezekiel Nathaniel (born 2003), Nigerian track and field athlete
- Gagarin Nathaniel (born 1995), Indonesian competitive swimmer
- Glory Onome Nathaniel (born 1996), Nigerian athlete
- Inez Nathaniel-Walker (1911–1990), African-American prison folk artist
- Jasper Nathaniel (born 1956), American journalist
- Jonadob Nathaniel, Indian biblical scholar
- Joseph Nathaniel (born 1993), Nigerian football player
- Leslie Nathaniel (born 1954), Anglican priest
- Nat Clifton (born Clifton Nathaniel; 1922–1990), American professional basketball and baseball player
- Samson Oghenewegba Nathaniel (born 1997), Nigerian athlete

== Fictional characters ==
- Nathaniel Fitzwilliam "Nate" Archibald in the Gossip Girl series
- Nathaniel "Natty" Bumppo, the main character in James Fenimore Cooper's novel The Last of The Mohicans
- Nathaniel Dusk, comic book character, private investigator
- Nathaniel Essex, alter ego of Mister Sinister, a Marvel Comics supervillain
- Nathaniel "Nate" Fisher, Jr. and his father Nathaniel Fisher Sr. in the television series Six Feet Under
- Captain Nathaniel Flint from Disney's Treasure Planet
- Nathaniel M. Laxamana, the protagonist of the Filipino TV series Nathaniel
- Nathaniel Macauley, in Karen McManus's One of Us Is Lying
- Nathaniel (surname unknown, also known as John Mandrake), one of the three main protagonists in the Bartimaeus Sequence by Jonathan Stroud
- Captain Nathaniel Renko, main character in the 2010 video game Singularity
- Nathaniel Kurtzberg, a character in the animated series Miraculous: Tales of Ladybug and Cat Noir
- Captain Nathaniel Joseph Claw, main character in the 1997 video game Claw
- Nathaniel Carello, character of the french otome game Amour sucré.

== Animals with this name ==
- Nathaniel (horse), winner of the King Edward VII Stakes and King George VI and Queen Elizabeth Stakes
