= Gnats (disambiguation) =

Gnats may refer to:

- Plural of Gnat, any of many species of tiny flying insects in the Dipterid suborder Nematocera
- GNATS, the GNU bug tracking system
- Folland Gnat, a small, swept-wing British subsonic jet trainer and light fighter aircraft first flown in 1955

== See also ==
- Gnat (disambiguation)
- Nats (disambiguation)
