= Nat =

Nat or NAT may refer to:

== Computing ==
- Network address translation (NAT), in computer networking

== Arts and entertainment ==
- Nat Smurfling, a fictional character from The Smurfs
- Nat, protagonist of the video game Is This Seat Taken?
- NAT: An Orchestral Portrait of Nat "King" Cole, a 1966 album by Nelson Riddle

== Chemistry, biology, and medicine ==
- Natural antisense transcript, an RNA transcript in a cell
- N-Acetyltransferase, an enzyme; also NAT1, NAT2, etc.
- N-Amyltryptamine, a tryptamine derivative
- Nucleic acid test, for genetic material
- Neonatal alloimmune thrombocytopenia, a disease
- Noradrenaline transporter (NAT), also called norepinephrine transporter (NET)
- Nucleobase ascorbate transporter (NAT) family, or Nucleobase cation symporter-2 (NCS2) family
- Sodium ammonium tartrate tetrahydrate, the material crystallized by Pasteur as enantiomers

== Organizations ==
- National Actors Theatre, New York City, U.S.
- National AIDS trust, a British charity
- National Archives of Thailand
- National Assembly of Thailand, the national parliament

== People ==
- Nat (name), a given name or nickname, usually masculine, and also a surname
- Nat (Muslim), a Muslim community in North India
- Nat caste, a Hindu caste found in northern India and Nepal

== Places ==
- Nat, Punjab, India, a village
- Nat, West Virginia, United States, an unincorporated community

== Other uses ==
- Nat (deity), deities worshipped in Myanmar and neighboring countries
- Nat (unit), a logarithmic unit of information or entropy
- Bestune NAT, a Chinese electric minivan
- Nottingham Asphalt Tester
- National Achievement Test, in the Philippines
- North Atlantic Tracks, a set of flight routes
- North Atlantic Treaty, the treaty that implemented NATO
- NAT, IATA airport code for Greater Natal International Airport, São Gonçalo do Amarante, Brazil
- NAT, former IATA airport code for Augusto Severo International Airport (closed)

== See also ==
- Gnat (disambiguation)
- NATS (disambiguation)
- Nath (disambiguation)
