= Fire Creek =

Fire Creek, Firecreek and Fires Creek may refer to:

- Fire Creek (2006 film)
- Firecreek, a 1968 film
- Fires Creek, a recreational area in North Carolina
- Fire Creek (Montana), a stream in Flathead County, Montana
- Fire Creek, West Virginia, an unincorporated community in Fayette County
