= Chicago (original Broadway cast recording) =

Cast recording by various artists
- Released: 1975
- Genre: Show tunes
- Label: Arista
- Producer: Phil Ramone

Chicago, subtitled Original Cast Album, is an album containing a recording of the 1975 Broadway musical Chicago made by its original cast. The album was released by Arista Records in the same year.

== Critical reception ==
Professional ratings
Review scores
| Source | Rating |
|---|---|
| AllMusic | 3.5/5 stars |
| Billboard | (favorable) |

In his retrospective review for AllMusic, William Ruhlmann rated the album 3.5 stars out of five, writing: "On this album, [the musical] sets [the] story to music effectively."

Back in 1975, Billboard picked the album for its "Spotlight" section. The magazine's reviewer noted: "On this LP, all of the play's excitement and 1930's Chicago spirit is caught by producer-engineer Phil Ramone. All of the music is snappy with standout singing performances by Gwen Verdon [...], Chita Rivera [...] and Jerry Orbach [...]. Several of the songs have a chance for airplay, although many contain blue lyrics that will hurt those chances."

In 2026, the album was inducted into the National Recording Registry as "culturally or historically significant".

== Chart performance ==
The album reached number 73 on the Billboard's Top LPs chart.

== Track listing ==
LP – Arista AL 9005

All lyrics are written by Fred Ebb; all music is composed by John Kander.

Side 1
| No. | Title | Length |
|---|---|---|
| 1. | "Overture" | 1:38 |
| 2. | "All That Jazz" | 3:04 |
| 3. | "Funny Honey" | 3:08 |
| 4. | "Cell Block Tango" | 5:10 |
| 5. | "When You're Good to Mama" | 3:11 |
| 6. | "All I Care About" | 3:27 |
| 7. | "A Little Bit of Good" | 3:15 |
| 8. | "We Both Reached for the Gun" | 3:42 |

Side 2
| No. | Title | Length |
|---|---|---|
| 1. | "Roxie" | 5:26 |
| 2. | "I Can't Do It Alone" | 2:48 |
| 3. | "My Own Best Friend" | 2:27 |
| 4. | "Me and My Baby" | 1:24 |
| 5. | "Mr. Cellophane" | 3:35 |
| 6. | "When Velma Takes the Stand" | 1:59 |
| 7. | "Razzle Dazzle" | 3:05 |
| 8. | "Class" | 2:49 |
| 9. | "Nowadays" | 3:11 |
| 10. | "All That Jazz Reprise" | 1:04 |

== Charts ==
| Chart (1975) | Peak position |
|---|---|
| US Billboard Top LPs | 73 |

== Awards ==
| Year | Award type | Categories | Results | Ref. |
|---|---|---|---|---|
| 1976 | Grammy Awards | Best Cast Show Album | Nominated | |
