= Chicago (1996 Broadway revival cast recording) =

Chicago – The Musical

Cast recording by various artists
- Released: January 28, 1997
- Studio: Hit Factory's Studio 1, New York
- Label: RCA Victor
- Producer: Jay David Saks

Chicago – The Musical is an album containing a recording of the musical Chicago made by its 1996 Broadway revival cast. The album was released by RCA Victor on January 28, 1997.

== Background ==
In the 1990s, New York's City Center started producing a series of "concertized" versions of old musicals. Wnen Chicago was premiered as part of the series in the spring of 1996, it happened to draw some unexpected parallels to the then-recent O. J. Simpson trial and was an instant hit. The production was then chosen to go on Broadway and taken to the Richard Rodgers Theatre, where it opened on November 18.

== Critical reception ==
Professional ratings
Review scores
Source	Rating
AllMusic	3/5 stars
AllMusic	(10th Anniversary Edition)
Billboard	(favorable)

Back in 1997, Billboard picked the album for review, particularly commending "the theater music know-how of RCA Victor and producer Jay David Saks." The reviewer rated the recording as "a success, thanks to the [...] score" that "aged beautifully" and to "the performances of leads" – Ann Reinking and Bebe Neuwirth. The reviewer also noted that Ann Reinking sounded "much like the show's original Gwen Verdon."

In his retrospective review for AllMusic, William Ruhlmann noted that the revival version of the musical sounded much better when compared to the original and was met with exuberant critical acclaim. Nevertheless, he concluded by saying: "The music remains generic '20s pastiche, [...] and the lyrics [still] seem unremittingly arch" and rated the album three stars on a scale of five. He also reviewed the 2006 "10th Anniversary" two-CD, one-DVD box set, rating it higher – four stars on a scale of five.

== Track listing ==
CD – RCA Victor 68727

All lyrics are written by Fred Ebb; all music is composed by John Kander.

Act one
No.	Title	Length
1.	"Overture"	1:47
2.	"All That Jazz"	5:03
3.	"Funny Honey"	3:36
4.	"Cell Block Tango"	6:13
5.	"When You're Good to Mama"	3:20
6.	"All I Care About"	3:48
7.	"A Little Bit of Good"	3:14
8.	"We Both Reached for the Gun"	3:58
9.	"Roxie"	5:10
10.	"I Can't Do It Alone"	4:48
11.	"I Can't Do It Alone" (Reprise)	0:39
12.	"My Own Best Friend"	2:39

Act two
No.	Title	Length
13.	"Entr'acte"	2:19
14.	"I Know a Girl"	2:05
15.	"Me and My Baby"	3:13
16.	"Mister Cellophane"	4:22
17.	"When Velma Takes the Stand"	2:12
18.	"Razzle Dazzle"	4:17
19.	"Class"	3:08
20.	"Nowadays"	4:48
21.	"Hot Honey Rag"	1:48
22.	"Finale"	1:04

== Certifications ==
Region	Certification	Certified units/sales
United States (RIAA)	Gold	500,000^{^}
^{^} Shipments figures based on certification alone.

== Awards ==
Year	Award type	Categories	Results	Ref.
1998	Grammy Awards	Best Musical Show Album	Won	
