= Nathaniel Wood =

Nathaniel Wood may refer to:

- Nathaniel Wood (occultist)
- Nathaniel Wood (fighter)

== See also ==
- Nathan Wood (disambiguation)
- Nate Wood, American jazz musician
- Execution of Nathaniel Woods, 2020 execution in Alabama
