= Young Nationals =

Young Nationals or Young Nats may refer to:

- the youth wing of a National Party
- Young Nationals (Australia), the youth wing of the National Party of Australia
- New Zealand Young Nationals, the youth wing of the New Zealand National Party
- Young Nationalists Organisation, the youth wing of the Nationalist Party of Australia

== See also ==
- Nat Young (disambiguation)
- NATS (disambiguation)
- NAT (disambiguation)
- Young (disambiguation)
- National (disambiguation)
- Nationals (disambiguation)
