= Nate =

Nate or NATE may refer to:

== People and fictional characters ==
- Nate (given name)

== Organizations ==
- National Association for the Teaching of English, the UK subject teacher association for all aspects of English from pre-school to university
- National Association of Theatrical Television and Kine Employees, formerly the National Association of Theatrical Employees

== Other uses ==
- Nakajima Ki-27, Japanese aircraft of World War II, called "Nate"
- Tropical Storm Nate (disambiguation)
- Nate (web portal), South Korean web portal
- Nate Station, a train station in Kinokawa, Wakayama Prefecture, Japan
- Nate, a 2006 novel by Phil Henderson
- Nate – A One Man Show, a performance by Natalie Palamides

== See also ==
- Nat (disambiguation)
