= Chicago (musical) =

1975 musical by John Kander and Fred Ebb

- Original Broadway poster art
- Music: John Kander
- Lyrics: Fred Ebb
- Book: Fred Ebb; Bob Fosse
- Basis: Chicago by Maurine Dallas Watkins
- Premiere: June 3, 1975: 46th Street Theatre, New York City
- Productions: 1975 Broadway; 1979 West End; 1996 Broadway revival; 1997 North America tour; 1997 West End revival; 2018 West End revival; 2021 UK Tour
- Awards: 1996 Tony Award for Best Revival of a Musical; 1997 Laurence Olivier Award for Outstanding Musical Production

Chicago is an American musical with music by John Kander, lyrics by Fred Ebb, and book by Ebb and Bob Fosse. Set in Chicago in the Jazz Age, the musical is based on the 1926 play of the same name by Maurine Dallas Watkins, then a journalist covering the city's courthouse beat. A satire on corruption in the administration of criminal justice, the plot follows felons who manipulate their stories to develop celebrity status.

The original Broadway production opened in June 1975 at the 46th Street Theatre and ran for 936 performances, closing in August 1977. Fosse directed and choreographed the original production, and his style is strongly identified with the show. The original West End production opened in 1979, running for 600 performances.

The ongoing 1996 revival of Chicago is the longest-running show currently on Broadway, holding the record as the longest-running musical revival and the longest-running American musical in Broadway history. The lengthy run ranks second only to The Phantom of the Opera, having surpassed Cats on November 23, 2014, upon its 7,486th performance. The 1997 West End revival became the longest-running American musical in West End history. Chicago has been staged in numerous productions around the world, and has toured extensively in the United States and United Kingdom. The musical's 2002 film adaptation won the Academy Award for Best Picture.

== History ==
The musical Chicago is based on a play of the same name by reporter and playwright Maurine Dallas Watkins, who was assigned to cover the 1924 trials of accused murderers Beulah Annan and Belva Gaertner for the Chicago Tribune. In the early 1920s, Chicago's press and public became riveted by the subject of homicides committed by women. Several high-profile cases arose, which generally involved women killing their lovers or husbands. These cases were tried against a backdrop of changing views of women in the Jazz Age, and a long string of acquittals by Cook County juries of female murderers (juries at the time were all male, and convicted murderers generally faced death by hanging). A lore arose that, in Chicago, feminine or attractive women could not be convicted. The Chicago Tribune generally favored the prosecution's case, while still presenting the details of these women's lives. Its rivals at the Hearst papers were more pro-defendant, and employed what were derisively called "sob-sisters" – women reporters who focused on the plight, attractiveness, redemption, or grace of the female defendants. Regardless of stance, the press covered several of these women as celebrities.

Annan, the model for the character of Southern transplant Roxie Hart, was 23 when she was accused of the April 3, 1924 murder of Harry Kalsted (or Kalstedt), who served as the basis for the Fred Casely character. The Tribune reported that Annan played the foxtrot record Hula Lou over and over for two hours before calling her husband to say she killed a man who "tried to make love to her". Her husband Albert Annan inspired the character Amos Hart. Albert was an auto mechanic who bankrupted himself to defend his wife, only for her to publicly dump him the day after she was acquitted. Velma Kelly is based on Gaertner, who was a cabaret singer and society divorcée. The body of Walter Law was discovered slumped over the steering wheel of Gaertner's abandoned car on March 12, 1924. Two police officers testified that they had seen a woman getting into the car and shortly thereafter heard gunshots. A bottle of gin and an automatic pistol were found on the floor of the car. Lawyers William Scott Stewart and W. W. O'Brien were models for a composite character in Chicago, Billy Flynn. Just days apart, separate juries at the Criminal Courts building acquitted both women.

Watkins' sensational columns documenting these trials proved so popular that she wrote a play based on them. The show received both good box-office sales and newspaper notices and was mounted on Broadway in 1926, running 172 performances. Cecil B. DeMille produced a silent film version, Chicago (1927), starring former Mack Sennett bathing beauty Phyllis Haver as Roxie Hart. It was later remade as Roxie Hart (1942) starring Ginger Rogers, but in this version, Roxie was accused of murder without having really committed it, due to content restrictions on Hollywood films of the era.

In the 1960s, Gwen Verdon read the play and asked her husband, Bob Fosse, about the possibility of creating a musical adaptation. Fosse approached playwright Watkins numerous times to buy the rights, but she repeatedly declined; historian Kevin Boyd Grubb has speculated that, by this point, Watkins may have regretted Annan and Gaertner's acquittals, and felt that her treatment of them should not be glamorized. Nonetheless, upon her death in 1969, her estate sold the rights to producer Richard Fryer, Verdon, and Fosse. John Kander and Fred Ebb began work on the musical score, modeling each number on a traditional vaudeville number or a vaudeville performer. This format made explicit the show's comparison between "justice", "show business", and contemporary society. Ebb and Fosse penned the book of the musical, and Fosse also directed and choreographed.

== Synopsis ==
=== Act I ===
Velma Kelly is a vaudevillian who welcomes the audience to tonight's show ("All That Jazz"). Interplayed with the opening number, the scene cuts to February 14, 1928 in the bedroom of a wannabe star Roxie Hart. Roxie fatally shoots Fred Casely as he attempts to break off an affair with her.

Roxie convinces her husband Amos that the victim was a burglar; Amos agrees to take the blame. Roxie expresses her appreciation of her husband's willingness to do anything for her ("Funny Honey"). However, when the police mention the deceased's name, Amos belatedly realizes that Roxie has lied to him. With both Roxie and Amos furious at each other for the other's betrayal, Roxie confesses and is arrested. She is sent to the women's block in the Cook County Jail, where several women accused of killing their lovers are held ("Cell Block Tango"); among the inmates is Velma Kelly, revealing herself to have been involved in the death of her husband and sister after she caught them having sex, though she denies committing the act on account of blacking out from the sight. The block is presided over by Matron "Mama" Morton, whose system of taking bribes ("When You're Good to Mama") perfectly suits her better-heeled clientele. She has helped Velma become the media's top murderer-of-the-week and is acting as a booking agent for Velma's big return to vaudeville.

Velma is not happy to see Roxie, who is stealing not only her limelight but also her lawyer, Billy Flynn. Roxie convinces Amos to pay for Billy Flynn to be her lawyer ("A Tap Dance"), though Amos lacks the funds. Nonetheless, Billy takes the case. Eagerly awaited by his all-woman clientele at the prison, Billy sings his anthem, complete with a chorus of fan dancers ("All I Care About"). Amos can only raise half the amount Billy demands as a retainer. To make up the difference, Billy turns the case into a media circus and rearranges Roxie's story for public consumption with help from sympathetic tabloid columnist Mary Sunshine ("A Little Bit of Good"), hoping to raise funds by auctioning off Roxie's belongings at inflated prices. Roxie's press conference turns into a ventriloquist act, with Billy dictating a new version of the truth ("We Both Reached for the Gun") to the reporters while Roxie mouths the words.

Roxie becomes the most popular celebrity in Chicago, as she boastfully proclaims while planning for her future career in vaudeville ("Roxie"). As Roxie's fame grows, Velma's notoriety subsides, and in an act of desperation she tries to talk Roxie into recreating the sister act ("I Can't Do It Alone"). Roxie turns her down, only to find her own headlines replaced by a newer sordid and sanguinary crime of passion by a woman (Go-To-Hell-Kitty) who kills her husband and the two women she found with him in bed ("I Can't Do It Alone (Reprise)"). Separately, Roxie and Velma realize there is no one they can count on but themselves ("My Own Best Friend"), and Roxie decides that being pregnant in prison would put her back on the front page.

=== Act II ===
Velma returns to introduce the opening act, resentful of Roxie's manipulation of the system ("I Know a Girl") and ability to seduce a doctor into saying Roxie is pregnant; as Roxie emerges, she sings gleefully of the future of her unborn (nonexistent) child ("Me and My Baby"). Amos proudly claims paternity, but still, nobody notices him, and Billy exposes holes in Roxie's story by noting that she and Amos had not had sex in four months, meaning if she were pregnant, the child was not Amos's, in hopes that Amos will divorce her and look like a villain, which Amos almost does ("Mister Cellophane"). Velma tries to show Billy all the tricks she has planned for her trial ("When Velma Takes The Stand"), which Roxie treats skeptically. Roxie, upset with being treated like a "common criminal" and considering herself a celebrity, has a heated argument with Billy and fires him; Billy warns her that her kind of celebrity is fleeting and that she would be just as famous hanging from a noose. At that moment, Roxie witnesses one of her fellow inmates, a Hungarian woman who insisted on her innocence but could not speak English and whose public lawyer failed to defend her, become the first woman to be executed in Chicago in decades.

The trial date arrives, and the now freshly terrified Roxie runs back to Billy, who calms Roxie by suggesting she will be fine so long as she makes a show of the trial ("Razzle Dazzle"). Billy uses Amos as a pawn, turning around and insisting that Amos is actually the father of Roxie's child. As Roxie recounts Billy's carefully crafted false narrative of the night of Fred's murder (with Fred re-appearing on stage in flashback), she steals all of Velma's schtick, down to the rhinestone garter, to the dismay of Mama and Velma ("Class"). As promised, Billy gets Roxie acquitted, but just as the verdict is announced, some even more sensational crime pulls the press away, and Roxie's fleeting celebrity life is over. Billy leaves, done with the case, admitting that he only did it for the money. Amos tries to get Roxie to come home and forget the ordeal, but she is more concerned with the end of her brief run of fame and admits she isn't pregnant, at which point a fed up Amos leaves her.

The final scene cuts to a Chicago vaudeville theater, where Roxie and Velma (acquitted off-stage) are performing a new act in which they sing bittersweetly about modern life ("Nowadays"). The former Mary Sunshine, revealed during the trial actually to be a man in drag, takes his natural male form as a pushy vaudeville promoter, shaping Roxie and Velma's dance ("Hot Honey Rag") to make it as sexy as possible. The show ends with a brief finale as Roxie and Velma thank their audience ("Finale").

== Musical numbers ==
1975 Original Broadway Production

"Chicago: A Musical Vaudeville"

Act 1

- "Overture" – Orchestra
- "All That Jazz" – Velma Kelly and Company
- "Funny Honey" – Roxie Hart
- "Cell Block Tango" – Velma and the Murderesses
- "When You're Good to Mama" – Mama Morton
- "Tap Dance" – Roxie, Amos, and Boys
- "All I Care About" – Billy Flynn and the Girls
- "A Little Bit of Good" – Mary Sunshine
- "We Both Reached for the Gun" – Billy, Roxie, Mary Sunshine
- "Roxie" – Roxie and Boys
- "I Can't Do It Alone" – Velma
- "Chicago After Midnight" – Orchestra
- "My Own Best Friend" – Roxie and Velma

Act 2

- "I Know a Girl" – Velma
- "Me and My Baby" – Roxie and Company
- "Mister Cellophane" – Amos Hart
- "When Velma Takes the Stand" – Velma and Boys
- "Razzle Dazzle" – Billy and Company
- "Class" – Velma and Morton
- "Nowadays" – Roxie
- Finale: "Nowadays"/"R.S.V.P"/"Keep It Hot" – Roxie and Velma †

1996 Revival Production

"Chicago: The Musical"

Act 1

- "Overture" – Orchestra
- "All That Jazz" – Velma and Company
- "Funny Honey" – Roxie
- "Cell Block Tango" – Velma and the Murderesses
- "When You're Good to Mama" – Mama Morton
- "Tap Dance" – Roxie, Amos, and Boys
- "All I Care About" – Billy Flynn and Girls
- "A Little Bit of Good" – Mary Sunshine
- "We Both Reached for the Gun" – Billy, Roxie, Mary and the Reporters
- "Roxie" – Roxie and Boys
- "I Can't Do It Alone" – Velma
- "I Can't Do It Alone (Reprise)" – Velma
- "My Own Best Friend" – Roxie and Velma
- "Finale Act I: All That Jazz (Reprise)" – Velma

Act 2

- "Entr'acte" – Orchestra
- "I Know a Girl" – Velma
- "Me and My Baby" – Roxie and Company
- "Mister Cellophane" – Amos
- "When Velma Takes the Stand" – Velma and Boys
- "Razzle Dazzle" – Billy and Company
- "Class" – Velma and Mama Morton
- "Nowadays" – Velma and Roxie
- "Hot Honey Rag" – Orchestra
- "Finale Act II: All That Jazz (Reprise)" – Company

† In the 1975 Original Broadway Production and its Playbill, there are a few contradicting song lists. Songs such as "R.S.V.P" and "Keep It Hot" which were instrumental pieces in the "Finale" were removed from the licensable music, but were included in original production and script. Other songs such as "Ten Percent" sung by a deleted character who was Velma's agent, and "No" sung by Roxie and Boys were cut soon into the production and only appear on demo recordings and in the original Playbill, but are not in the original script. Other cut songs from the show were "Rose Colored Glasses" a different version of "We Both Reached for the Gun", "Pansy Eyes", and "Loopin' the Loop".

== Cast and characters ==
=== Original casts ===
Source for West End: overthefootlights.co.uk

Principal characters (defined as having at least one featured musical number) and original performers of notable productions:

Character	Description	Broadway	West End	Australia	Broadway	West End
Character	Description	1975	1979	1981	1996	1997
Roxie Hart	An aspiring vaudevillian and murderess who kills her paramour after a spat and is sent to jail. Mezzo-soprano	Gwen Verdon	Antonia Ellis	Nancye Hayes	Ann Reinking	Ruthie Henshall
Velma Kelly	A vaudevillian and murderess who is on trial for killing her cheating husband and sister. She is represented by Billy Flynn and competes with Roxie Hart for him. Alto	Chita Rivera	Jenny Logan	Geraldine Turner	Bebe Neuwirth	Ute Lemper
Billy Flynn	Velma and Roxie's lawyer who has a perfect track record and makes celebrities of his clients to win sympathy and sway public opinion. Baritone	Jerry Orbach	Ben Cross	Terence Donovan	James Naughton	Henry Goodman
Amos Hart	Roxie's faithful and good-natured but simple husband whom nobody pays attention to. He spends most of the show trying to make Roxie take interest in him or even just acknowledge his existence. Baritone	Barney Martin	Don Fellows	George Spartels	Joel Grey	Nigel Planer
Matron "Mama" Morton	The matron of the Cook County Jail. Grants the inmates favors in exchange for bribes. Alto	Mary McCarty	Hope Jackman	Judi Connelli	Marcia Lewis	Meg Johnson
Mary Sunshine	The sob sister journalist who follows the trials of both Roxie Hart and Velma Kelly. In most productions, Mary Sunshine is revealed to be male at the end of the show. Countertenor	Michael O'Haughey	Gary Lyons	J.P. Webster	David Sabella-Mills	Charles Shirvell

=== Notable replacements ===
Broadway (1975–1977)

- Roxie Hart: Liza Minnelli, Lenora Nemetz, Ann Reinking
- Velma Kelly: Lenora Nemetz
- Amos Hart: Rex Everhart
- Mama Morton: Alaina Reed Hall

Broadway (1996–)

- Roxie Hart: Pamela Anderson, Mel B, Kate Baldwin, Christie Brinkley, Charlotte d'Amboise, Paige Davis, Kara DioGuardi, Sandy Duncan, Veronica Dunne, Charlotte Kate Fox, Robin Givens, Ashley Graham, Melanie Griffith, Melora Hardin, Samantha Harris, Marilu Henner, Ruthie Henshall, Olivia Holt, Ivy, Erika Jayne, Bonnie Langford, Whitney Leavitt, Ariana Madix, Shiri Maimon, Bianca Marroquín, Alyssa Milano, Gretchen Mol, Jennifer Nettles, Bebe Neuwirth, Petra Nielsen, Brandy Norwood, Desi Oakley, Lisa Rinna, Chita Rivera, Krysta Rodriguez, Angelica Ross, Brooke Shields, Ashlee Simpson, Mira Sorvino, Amy Spanger, Denise van Outen, Ana Villafañe, Nana Visitor, Reece Weaver, Michelle Williams, Rumer Willis, Rita Wilson, Ryoko Yonekura, Karen Ziemba
- Velma Kelly: Pia Douwes, Deidre Goodwin, Lana Gordon, Jasmine Guy, Mýa Harrison, Ruthie Henshall, Carly Hughes, Robyn Hurder, Nikka Graff Lanzarone, Sharon Lawrence, Ute Lemper, Vicki Lewis, Bianca Marroquín, Luba Mason, Anna Montanaro, Caroline O'Connor, Reva Rice, Amra-Faye Wright, Leigh Zimmerman
- Billy Flynn: Pasquale Aleardi, Obba Babatundé, Mark Ballas, Brent Barrett, Hinton Battle, Erich Bergen, Wayne Brady, Jaime Camil, Philip Casnoff, Maxwell Caulfield, Chuck Cooper, Billy Ray Cyrus, Jason Danieley, Taye Diggs, Brandon Victor Dixon, Colman Domingo, John Dossett, Christopher Fitzgerald, Alexander Gemignani, Eddie George, Cuba Gooding Jr., Louis Gossett Jr., Michael C. Hall, Todrick Hall, George Hamilton, Harry Hamlin, Gregory Harrison, Tom Hewitt, James Monroe Iglehart, Gregory Jbara, James T. Lane, Matteo Lane, Joey Lawrence, Huey Lewis, Norm Lewis, Hal Linden, Peter Lockyer, Jeff McCarthy, Christopher McDonald, Brian McKnight, Tam Mutu, Paul Alexander Nolan, John O'Hurley, Adam Pascal, Marti Pellow, Clarke Peters, Ron Raines, Kevin Richardson, John Schneider, Matthew Settle, Chaz Lamar Shepherd, Christopher Sieber, Jerry Springer, Elvis Stojko, Patrick Swayze, Paulo Szot, Alan Thicke, Robert Urich, Usher, Ben Vereen, Max von Essen, Nik Walker, Tom Wopat, Sebastián Yatra, Tony Yazbeck, Billy Zane, Adrian Zmed, Marco Zunino
- Amos Hart: Rob Bartlett, Kevin Carolan, Kevin Chamberlin, Cory English, Christopher Fitzgerald, James T. Lane, Tom McGowan, Isaac Mizrahi, Vincent Pastore, Ernie Sabella, Chris Sullivan, Paul C. Vogt
- Mama Morton: Kandi Burruss, B.J. Crosby, Charity Angél Dawson, Lea DeLaria, Larisa Dolina, Debbie Gravitte, Jennifer Holliday, Cady Huffman, Patti LaBelle, NeNe Leakes, Adriane Lenox, Debra Monk, Jinkx Monsoon, Anne L. Nathan, Bebe Neuwirth, Alex Newell, Orfeh, Michele Pawk, Christine Pedi, Roz Ryan, Camille Saviola, Valerie Simpson, Angie Stone, Mary Testa, Aida Turturro, Sofía Vergara, Lillias White, Terri White, Wendy Williams, Chandra Wilson, Carol Woods
- Mary Sunshine: Daniel Levine, Max von Essen

West End revival (1997–2012)

- Roxie Hart: Tina Arena, Emma Barton, Christie Brinkley, Anita Louise Combe, Jennifer Ellison, America Ferrera, Maria Friedman, Josefina Gabrielle, Jill Halfpenny, Linzi Hateley, Bonnie Langford, Aoife Mulholland, Petra Nielsen, Chita Rivera, Frances Ruffelle, Suzanne Shaw, Brooke Shields, Ashlee Simpson, Claire Sweeney, Sally Ann Triplett, Denise van Outen, Michelle Williams
- Velma Kelly: Anna-Jane Casey, Anita Louise Combe, Pia Douwes, Ruthie Henshall, Nicola Hughes, Debbie Kurup, Rachel McDowall, Anna Montanaro, Valarie Pettiford, Leigh Zimmerman
- Billy Flynn: Luca Barbareschi, John Barrowman, David Bedella, Darius Campbell, Maxwell Caulfield, Robin Cousins, Juan Pablo Di Pace, John Diedrich, Sacha Distel, Michael French, Matthew Goodgame, Michael Greco, Tony Hadley, David Hasselhoff, Raza Jaffrey, Duncan James, Terence Maynard,Ian Kelsey, Craig McLachlan, Jimmy Osmond, Marti Pellow, Clarke Peters, Kevin Richardson, Rolf Saxon, Michael Siberry, Jerry Springer, Jonathan Wilkes, Gary Wilmot
- Amos Hart: Justin Lee Collins, Peter Davison, Les Dennis, James Doherty, Joel Grey, Gareth Hale, Kevin Kennedy, George Layton, Victor McGuire, Dale Meeks, Norman Pace, Clive Rowe
- Mama Morton: Lynda Carter, Sharon D. Clarke, Anita Dobson, Brenda Edwards, Diane Langton, Alison Moyet, Kelly Osbourne, Gaby Roslin
- Mary Sunshine: Cory English, Nathan Kiley

== Musical and staging style ==
According to Fred Ebb, he wrote the book in a vaudeville style because "the characters were performers. Every musical moment in the show was loosely modeled on someone else: Roxie was Helen Morgan, Velma was Texas Guinan, Billy Flynn was Ted Lewis, Mama Morton was Sophie Tucker." Composer John Kander elaborates that the reason the show was called a vaudeville "is because many of the songs we wrote are related to specific performers like those you mentioned, and Eddie Cantor and Bert Williams as well."

It was through the initial production, and not the writing, that many of the "traditional" Chicago staging conventions were developed. The double snap in "Razzle Dazzle" was added as an afterthought at the suggestion of Ebb to Kander. Kander recalled:

"I remember when we wrote 'Razzle Dazzle', before we took it in and played it for Bob, [Fred Ebb] said with absolute confidence 'Try adding a couple of finger snaps to it. Bobby will love that.' We added them...and as soon as he heard the finger snaps, he loved the song."

During rehearsals, "Razzle Dazzle" was originally staged as an orgy on the steps of the courthouse. Fosse was talked out of allowing this staging, when Orbach "convinced him that he was missing the Brechtian subtlety intrinsic in the number".

The original finale was "Loopin' the Loop", a doubles act with Verdon and Rivera; however, "the scene seemed too much like an amateur act so Fosse asked for something more 'glamorous in pretty gowns'". The piece was cut and replaced with "Nowadays". Instrumental sections of "Loopin' the Loop" can still be heard in the Overture. Two other sections termed "Keep It Hot" and "RSVP" were cut from the finale as well.

Another principal character, a theatrical agent named Henry Glassman, was played by David Rounds, whose role was to exploit the notoriety of the prisoners for his own gain. He also served as the evening's M.C. This character's role and the song "Ten Percent" was cut, with the character folded into that of Matron Mama Morton, and various members of the chorus shared his M.C. duties.

In a reversal of roles, Fosse decided the lyrics for "Class" were too offensive and censored Kander and Ebb's original version. One of the original lyrics "Every guy is a snot/Every girl is a twat" was restored for the 2002 film, although the entire number was cut from the final product.

== Productions ==
=== Original Broadway production ===
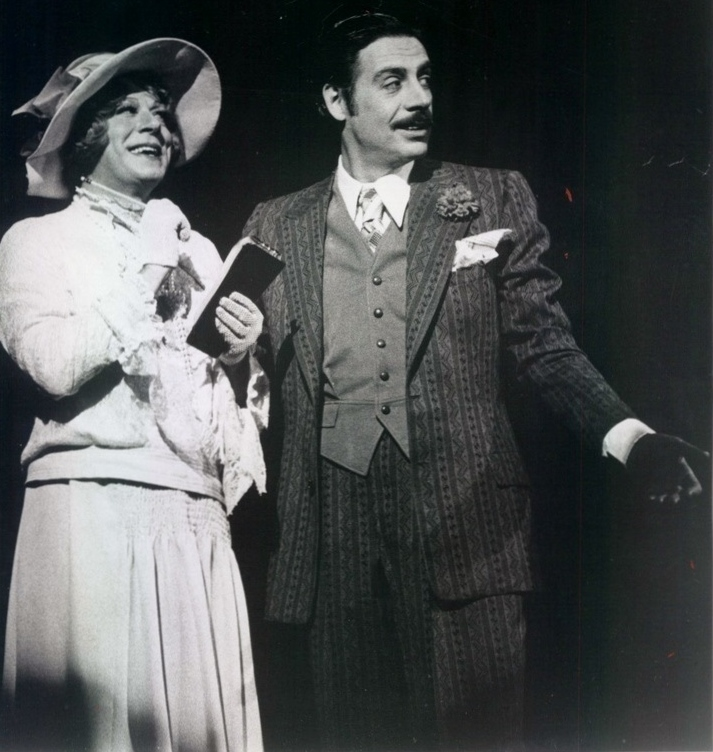
M. O'Haughey as Mary Sunshine and Jerry Orbach as Billy Flynn in the original Broadway cast, 1976

Following a Philadelphia tryout from April 8, 1975, to May 3, 1975, at the Forrest Theatre, Chicago: A Musical Vaudeville opened June 3, 1975 at the 46th Street Theatre, and ran for a total of 936 performances, closing August 27, 1977. The opening night cast starred Chita Rivera as Velma Kelly, Gwen Verdon as Roxie Hart, Jerry Orbach as Billy Flynn, and Barney Martin as Amos Hart. Velma Kelly had been a comparatively minor Chicago character prior to the musical adaptation, with the role being expanded to better balance the leads of Rivera and Verdon.

The musical received mixed reviews. The Brechtian style of the show, which frequently dropped the fourth wall, made audiences uncomfortable. According to James Leve, "Chicago is cynical and subversive, exploiting American cultural mythologies in order to attack American celebrity culture."

The show opened the same year as Michael Bennett's highly successful A Chorus Line, which beat out Chicago in both ticket sales and at the Tony Awards. The show was on the verge of closing when it ran into another setback: Verdon had to have surgery on nodes in her throat after inhaling a feather during the show's finale. The producers contemplated closing the show, but Liza Minnelli stepped in and offered to play the role of Roxie Hart in place of Verdon. Her run lasted slightly over a month (August 8, 1975, through September 13, 1975), boosting the show's popularity, until Verdon recuperated and returned to the show. Ann Reinking, who would go on to star in the highly successful 1996 revival and choreograph that production in the style of Fosse, was also a cast replacement for Roxie Hart during the show's original run.

In 2026, the original cast recording was selected by the Library of Congress for preservation in the National Recording Registry for being “culturally, historically, or aesthetically significant.”

=== 1979 West End ===
The first West End, London production opened at the Cambridge Theatre in April 1979 and ran for around 600 performances (having had its European premiere at the Crucible Theatre, Sheffield, on 23 November 1978). It commenced in the West End with most of the Sheffield cast, and was directed by Peter James and choreographed by Gillian Gregory. The producers were Ray Cooney and Larry Parnes. Jenny Logan starred as Velma Kelly, with Ben Cross as Billy, Antonia Ellis as Roxie Hart, and Don Fellows as Amos Hart. Ellis (Actress of the Year in a Musical) and Ben Cross (Actor of the Year in a Musical) were nominated for the Laurence Olivier Award for their performances, and the musical was nominated as Musical of the Year. Elizabeth Seal later replaced Ellis as Roxie Hart.

=== 1977 Argentina ===
The original Argentine production opened at the Teatro El Nacional featuring Nélida Lobato (Roxie), Ambar La Fox (Velma), Marty Cosens (Billy), Jovita Luna (Mama Morton) and Juan Carlos Thorry (Amos) as a replica of the original Broadway production. The book was adapted by Enrique Pinti and the production was directed by Wilfredo Ferran and Mike Ribas. Gene Foote choreographed the production based on the original choreography by Bob Fosse. It was produced by Alejandro Romay.

=== 1981 Australia ===
The original Australian production opened at the Sydney Opera House's Drama Theatre in June 1981. Featuring Nancye Hayes (Roxie), Geraldine Turner (Velma), Terence Donovan (Billy), Judi Connelli (Mama) and George Spartels (Amos), it was a new production directed by Richard Wherrett for the Sydney Theatre Company, rather than a replica of the Broadway production. It transferred to the Theatre Royal in Sydney, before touring to Melbourne's Comedy Theatre, Adelaide's Festival Theatre and a return season at the Theatre Royal, playing until March 1982. Sydney Theatre Company's production also toured to the Hong Kong Arts Festival in February 1983.

=== 1992 Los Angeles ===
The Long Beach Civic Light Opera presented Chicago in 1992, directed by Rob Marshall with choreography by Ann Reinking. Juliet Prowse played Roxie opposite Bebe Neuwirth as Velma. Gary Sandy played Billy Flynn with Kaye Ballard as Mama Morton.

=== 1996 Broadway revival ===
City Center Encores! series presented Chicago in concert in May 1996. The Encores! series, according to their statement, "celebrates the rarely heard works of America's most important composers and lyricists...Encores! gives three glorious scores the chance to be heard as their creators originally intended."

The production was directed by Walter Bobbie with choreography "in the style of Bob Fosse" by Ann Reinking, who also reprised her previous role as Roxie Hart. Also in the cast were Bebe Neuwirth as Velma Kelly, Joel Grey as Amos Hart and James Naughton as Billy Flynn. The show was well-received, with Howard Kissel, reviewing for the New York Daily News writing that "This Chicago impressed me far more than the original.". Ben Brantley, in his review for The New York Times, wrote " 'Make love to the audience' was another Fosse dictum. That's exactly what Ms. Reinking and her ensemble do. Chicago can still seem glibly cynical and artificially cold, especially in its weaker second act. But these performers know just how to take off the chill." By May 10, 1996, there was talk of a Broadway production: "Down the block, there is a move afoot to move the Encores production of Chicago to Broadway. Rocco Landesman said that he and Fran and Barry Weissler wanted to bring the production to the Martin Beck Theater this summer."

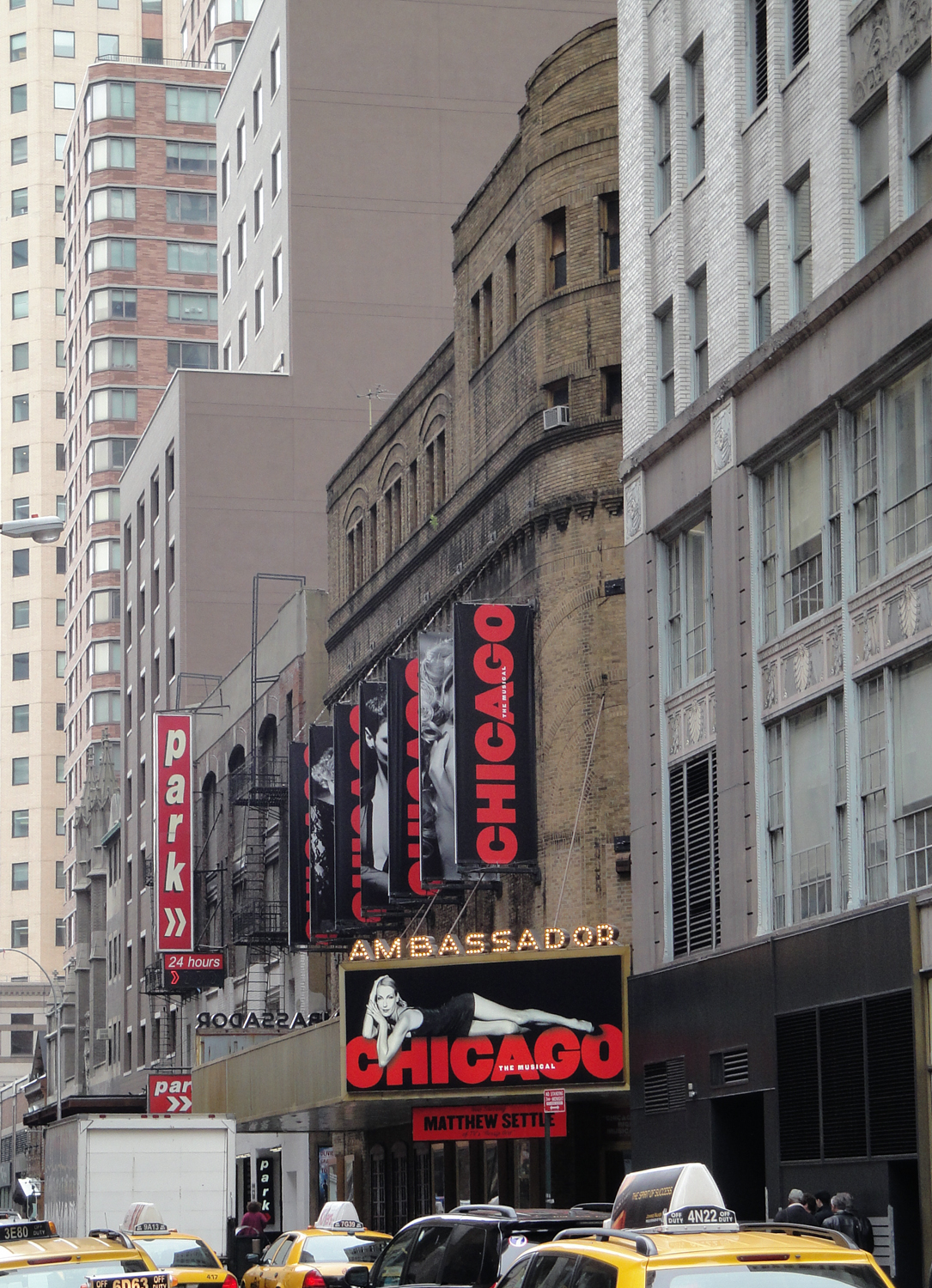
Chicago: The Musical at the Ambassador Theatre, New York, May 2010

Barry and Fran Weissler brought the Encores! production to Broadway, after some revision and expansion, but retaining the spare and minimalist style in costumes and set. The set design includes the presence of the band center stage in an evocation of a jury box, around and upon which the actors play some scenes. There are also chairs along the sides of this central piece, in which the actors at times sit or lounge, when not directly involved in the action. The show opened on November 14, 1996, at the Richard Rodgers Theatre (the same theater where the original production had played) with a script adapted by David Thompson, eventually setting a record for recovering its initial costs faster than any other musical in history, likely due in part to the minimalist and stripped-down design elements.

Unlike the original production, the revival was met with praise from critics. The CurtainUp reviewer noted, "The show garnered ecstatic reviews, enviable box office sales and enough awards to warrant a special Chicago trophy room." Society had changed in light of events such as the O. J. Simpson murder case, and audiences were more receptive to the criminal-as-celebrity theme of the show.

The revival of Chicago won six Tony Awards, more than any other revival in Broadway history (a record held until 2008). Chicago won for Best Revival of a Musical, Best Leading Actress in a Musical for Bebe Neuwirth, Best Leading Actor in a Musical for James Naughton, Best Lighting Design of a Musical for Ken Billington, Best Director of a Musical for Walter Bobbie and Best Choreography for Ann Reinking. RCA Victor released the revival cast recording on January 28, 1997, which went on to win the Best Musical Show Album at the 40th Annual Grammy Awards.

The Broadway production moved into the larger Shubert Theatre on February 12, 1997. More than six years into its run, the Broadway production moved a second time, on January 29, 2003, to the Ambassador Theatre, where it has played ever since. Chicago became the second longest-running Broadway show, surpassing Cats, on November 23, 2014. Chicago: The Musical has since run for more than 11,000 performances and holds the record for longest-running revival on Broadway.

Among the many other performers and celebrities who have appeared in the show are Adam Pascal, Alan Thicke, Alex Newell, Alyssa Milano, Amra-Faye Wright, Amy Spanger, Ana Villafañe, Angelica Ross, Ariana Madix, Ashley Graham, Ashlee Simpson, Billy Ray Cyrus, Billy Zane, Brandy Norwood, Brooke Shields, Carol Woods, Chandra Wilson, Charity Angél Dawson, Charlotte d'Amboise, Chris Sullivan, Christie Brinkley, Christine Pedi, Christopher Fitzgerald, Christopher Sieber, Cuba Gooding Jr., Debra Monk, Eddie George, Elvis Stojko, Erich Bergen, Erika Jayne, Gretchen Mol, Isaac Mizrahi, Ivy, Jaime Camil, James Monroe Iglehart, Jeff McCarthy, Jennifer Holliday, Jennifer Nettles, Jerry Springer, Jinkx Monsoon, Joey Lawrence, John O'Hurley, Kate Baldwin, Kara DioGuardi, Kevin Chamberlin, Kevin Richardson, Krysta Rodriguez, Leigh Zimmerman, Lillias White, Lisa Rinna, Marco Zunino, Marilu Henner, Mark Ballas, Marti Pellow, Matteo Lane, Max von Essen, Mel B, Melanie Griffith, Melora Hardin, Michael C. Hall, Michelle Williams, Mira Sorvino, Mýa, Nana Visitor, NeNe Leakes, Nik Walker, Norm Lewis, Orfeh, Pamela Anderson, Patrick Swayze, Paulo Szot, Philip Casnoff, Reece Weaver, Rita Wilson, Rob Bartlett, Roz Ryan, Rumer Willis, Ruthie Henshall, Samantha Harris, Sebastián Yatra, Shiri Maimon, Sofía Vergara, Tam Mutu, Taye Diggs, Todrick Hall, Tony Yazbeck, Usher, Veronica Dunne, Wendy Williams, and Whitney Leavitt.

=== London revivals ===
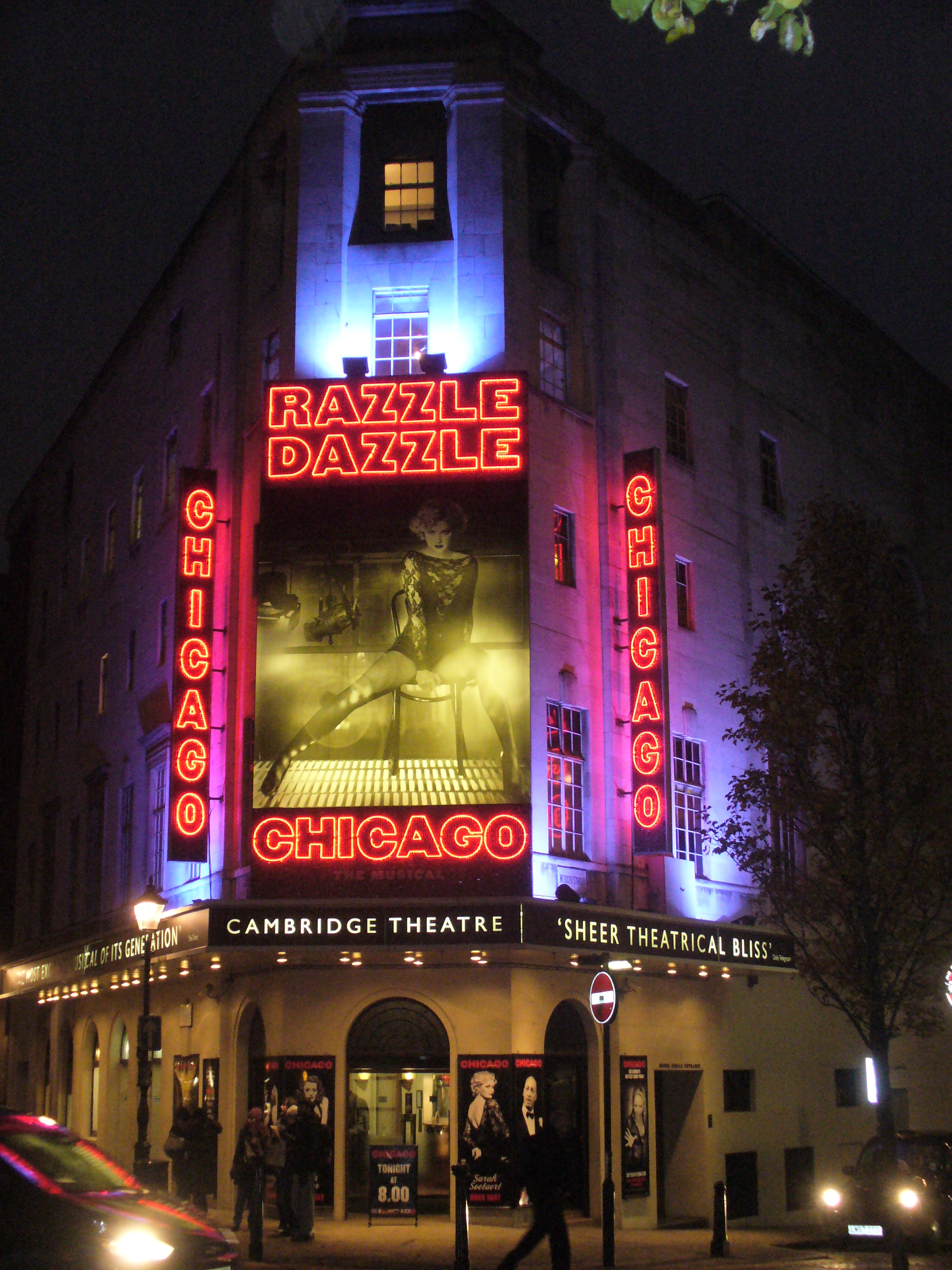
Chicago playing at the West End's Cambridge Theatre in December 2010

On November 18, 1997, the revival production opened in London's West End. Like the New York revival, it was directed by Walter Bobbie and designed by John Lee Beatty, with choreography by Ann Reinking in the style of Bob Fosse. The show ran at the Adelphi Theatre for nine years until transferring to the Cambridge Theatre in April 2006. The original cast of the production included German jazz singer Ute Lemper as Velma, British actress Ruthie Henshall as Roxie Hart, Nigel Planer as Amos Hart, and Henry Goodman as Billy Flynn. The production won the 1998 Olivier Award for Outstanding Musical, and Lemper was awarded Best Actress in a Musical. Both Lemper and Henshall have played the role of Velma on Broadway.

Like its Broadway counterpart, the London production featured many celebrities, including Alison Moyet, America Ferrera, Anita Dobson, Anita Louise Combe, Aoife Mulholland, Ashlee Simpson, Bonnie Langford, Brooke Shields, Chita Rivera, Christie Brinkley, Claire Sweeney, Clive Rowe, Darius Campbell, David Hasselhoff, Denise van Outen, Frances Ruffelle, Gaby Roslin, Ian Kelsey, James Doherty, Jennifer Ellison, Jerry Springer, Jill Halfpenny, Joel Grey, John Barrowman, Josefina Gabrielle, Justin Lee Collins, Kelly Osbourne, Kevin Richardson, Leigh Zimmerman, Les Dennis, Linzi Hateley, Lynda Carter, Maria Friedman, Marti Pellow, Michael French, Michael Greco, Michelle Williams, Peter Davison, Raza Jaffrey, Sacha Distel, Sally Ann Triplett, Terence Maynard, Tina Arena, and Tony Hadley.

The production moved out of the Cambridge Theatre on August 27, 2011 and transferred to the Garrick Theatre on November 7, 2011, starring America Ferrera as Roxie. Robin Cousins joined the cast as Billy Flynn on July 17, 2012. The show closed on September 1, 2012, after a total run of nearly 15 years in London. The UK tour of the production continued after the closing.

To celebrate the 21st Anniversary of the West End revival production, Chicago returned, this time at the Phoenix Theatre opening April 11, 2018, starring Cuba Gooding Jr. as Billy Flynn, Sarah Soetaert as Roxie Hart, Josefina Gabrielle as Velma Kelly, and Ruthie Henshall as Mama Morton. A cast change saw Martin Kemp take over the role of Billy Flynn, with Alexandra Burke as Roxie Hart and Mazz Murray as Mama Morton. Denise Van Outen was announced to take over the role of Velma from 24 September 2018, but due to sustaining a stress fracture in her heel, her integration was delayed until 7 October. The production featured on ITV's reality show, The Big Audition, to cast the replacement Velma. Following multiple rounds of singing, dancing and acting auditions, Laura Tyrer was selected to fill in for the role.

=== North American tours ===
The following the closing of the original Broadway production of Chicago, a national tour was launched in 1977. Carolyn Kirsch starred as Velma and Penny Worth as Roxie, with Jerry Orbach again in the role of Billy Flynn. The ensemble included Kirsten Childs as June and Susan Stroman as Hunyak. Chita Rivera and Gwen Verdon later stepped in to reprise the roles they had originated on Broadway.

There have been ten North American national tours of the 1996 revival production of Chicago. The first tour started in April 1997 in Cincinnati, Ohio, six months after the revival opened on Broadway. The cast featured Charlotte d'Amboise (Roxie Hart), Jasmine Guy (Velma Kelly), Obba Babatundé (Billy Flynn) and Carol Woods (Matron "Mama" Morton). A second company started in December 1997 in Tampa, Florida. The tour went on hiatus in Fall 1999 and started again in October 1999 in Denver, Colorado, featuring Robert Urich as Billy Flynn, Vicki Lewis (Velma) and Nana Visitor (Roxie). The next tour started in October 2000 in Stamford, Connecticut, with Robert Urich. Chita Rivera joined the tour for several weeks.

The 2003 tour started in June 2003 at the National Theatre, Washington, DC, with Brenda Braxton playing Velma, Bianca Marroquin as Roxie, and Gregory Harrison as Billy Flynn. During 2004 the tour cast included Alan Thicke and Tom Wopat as Billy Flynn and Carol Woods as Matron "Mama" Morton. The most recent tour started in November 2008 in Charlotte, North Carolina and starred Tom Wopat as Billy Flynn, Bianca Marroquin as Roxie Hart, Terra C. MacLeod as Velma Kelly and Roz Ryan (later replaced by Carol Woods) as Matron "Mama" Morton. On January 16, 2012, Peruvian actor Marco Zunino joined the cast as Billy Flynn.

=== 2013 Hollywood Bowl ===
For its annual fully staged musical event, the Hollywood Bowl produced a limited run of Chicago from July 26–28, 2013, directed by Brooke Shields. The cast included Samantha Barks as Velma Kelly, Ashlee Simpson as Roxie Hart, Stephen Moyer as Billy Flynn, Drew Carey as Amos Hart, and Lucy Lawless as Mama Morton.

=== 2019 Australia ===
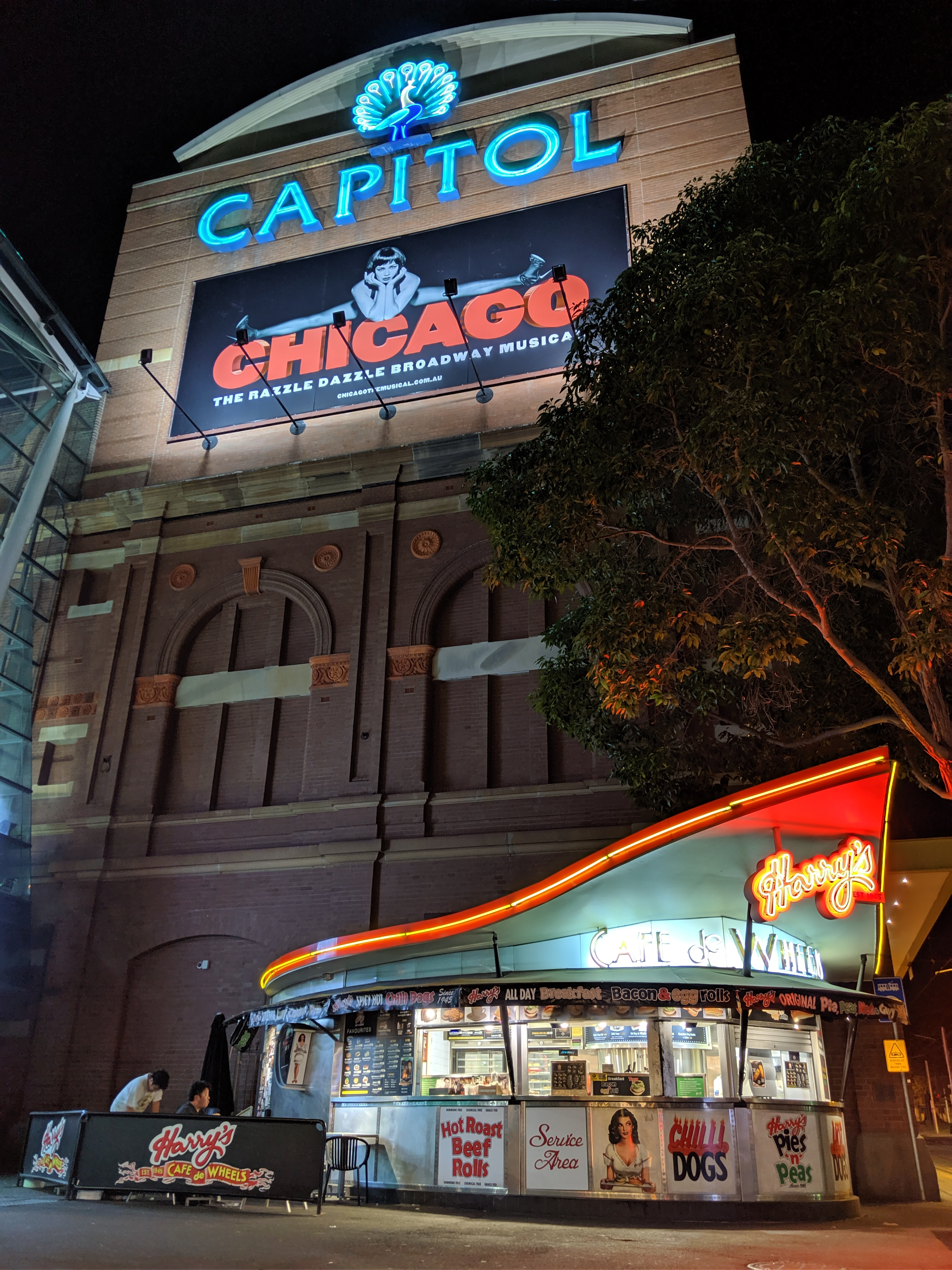
Chicago at the Capitol Theatre, Sydney in 2019

On 14 June 2018, the Gordon Frost Organisation announced a revival tour of Chicago commencing early 2019 at the Capitol Theatre in Sydney. The show starred Natalie Bassingthwaighte as Roxie and Casey Donovan as Mama Morton. The Melbourne leg of the tour starred Jason Donovan as Billy Flynn. Donovan's father Terence had played the same role in the 1981 Australian production.

=== 2021 UK tour ===
A new UK and Ireland tour began on September 11, 2021, at the King's Theatre, Glasgow.

=== 2023 Australia ===
Australian theatrical producers John Frost (For Crossroads Live Australia) and Suzanne Jones (For Jones Theatrical Company) have confirmed they are uniting once more to bring Chicago back to Australia. This 2023/2024 production of Chicago will have its premiere at Perth's Crown Theatre from November 2023, with a Brisbane season at the Queensland Performing Arts Centre (QPAC) Lyric Theatre to closely follow in January 2024. Two months later in March 2024, Her Majesty's Theatre in Melbourne will host the production, And opens in August at the Festival Theatre Adelaide. Australia musical theatre star Anthony Warlow portrayed the role of Billy Flynn opposite Lucy Maunder as Roxie Hart.

=== International productions ===
Chicago has been produced several times in Denmark. The earliest productions were at Aarhus Teater and Alléscenen, both in 1976, with the latter notably starring Susse Wold as Roxie Hart, Lisbet Dahl as Velma Kelly, and Bent Mejding as Billy Flynn. Chicago has subsequently been produced at Det Danske Teater in 1977, Mercurteatret in 1988, Odense Teater in 1989, and Nørrebros Teater in 1992. Recently, Chicago has been produced twice at Det Ny Teater. The first production opened September 2007 and starred Birgitte Hjort Sørensen as Roxie Hart, Julie Steincke as Velma Kelly, and Peter Jorde as Billy Flynn. The second production opened January 2017 and starred Maria Lucia Rosenberg as Roxie Hart and Tomas Ambt Kofod as Billy Flynn, with Steincke reprising her role of Velma Kelly. A new production of Chicago at Aarhus Teater opened May 2024.

The first Japanese-language production of the Tony-winning revival of Kander and Ebb's Chicago debuted in October 2008 at the Akasaka ACT Theatre in Tokyo, Japan, followed by an engagement at Osaka's Umeda Art Theatre. Presented by Barry and Fran Weissler in association with Tokyo Broadcasting System, Inc. and Kyodo Tokyo Inc., the b production starred Ryoko Yonekura as Roxie Hart, Yōka Wao as Velma Kelly and Ryuichi Kawamura as Billy Flynn.

In Peru, the musical opened on June 16, 2012, starring Tati Alcántara, Denisse Dibós, and Marco Zunino at Teatro Municipal de Lima in Lima. The show was also staged using a Spanish translation in Costa Rica in 2017 starring Silvia Baltodano and Isabel Guzman.

A French-language production of Chicago, based on the Broadway 1996 revival, opened on September 18, 2018, at Théâtre Mogador in Paris with Sofia Essaïdi as Velma Kelly, Carien Keizer as Roxie Hart and Jean-Luc Guizone as Billy Flynn. Directed by Dominique Trottein with a book translated by Nicolas Engel, this production is choreographed by Ann Reinking and the music was supervised by Rob Bowman. This production closed on June 30, 2019.

In March 2019, the U.S. national touring cast completed a nine-day, 16-performance Chicago residency at Heichal HaTarbut in Tel Aviv, with Israeli singer and actress Shiri Maimon reprising the role of Roxie Hart that she previously held on Broadway.

The Stratford Festival in Ontario, Canada, presented an entirely new production of Chicago as part of their 2020 season; the organization was granted new production rights outside of New York or London for the first time in 30 years. It was directed by Donna Feore.

A new production directed by Drew Anthony and choreographed by Lauren Ferreira was staged at The Royale Theatre at Planet Royale during September 2022, with Lucy Williamson as Velma, Elethea Sartorelli as Roxie, Brendan Hanson as Billy Flynn, Rachel Monamy as Mama Morton, Vincent Hooper as Amos and Greg Jarema as Mary Sunshine.

In addition, a production of Chicago was staged in Seoul in 2000, and again in 2003 and 2007. Chicago has been staged in Seoul several additional times since then; in 2018, the musical had its thousandth Korean performance.

An Indonesian production of Chicago premiered in Jakarta, Indonesia for 8 shows in April 2026. The production starred Putri Indam Kamila as Roxie Hart, Galabby as Velma Kelly, Beyon Destiano as Matron "Mama" Morton, and Gusty Pratama as Billy Flynn. The show marked the first international musical IP to be brought to Indonesia and performed partially in Bahasa Indonesian.

== Recordings ==
Artwork for original Broadway cast recording (1975)

There have been several cast recordings of Chicago:

- 1975 Original Broadway Cast
- 1981 Original Australian Cast
- 1996 Broadway Revival
- 1998 London Cast
- 1997 Austrian (German-language) Cast – Live Cast Album (with Anna Montanaro)
- 1999 Dutch Cast – Live Cast Album, 2 discs (with Pia Douwes)
- 2002 Film Soundtrack
- 2014 German Cast - Live Cast Album, Stuttgart, 1 disc with Nigel Casey, Lana Gordon, Carien Keizer

In 2026, the 1975 original Broadway cast recording was selected by the Library of Congress for preservation in the National Recording Registry for its "cultural, historical or aesthetic importance in the nation's recorded sound heritage."

== Awards and nominations ==
=== Original Broadway production ===
Year	Award Ceremony	Category	Nominee	Result
1976	Tony Award	Best Musical		Nominated
1976	Tony Award	Best Book of a Musical	Bob Fosse and Fred Ebb	Nominated
1976	Tony Award	Best Original Score	John Kander and Fred Ebb	Nominated
1976	Tony Award	Best Actor in a Musical	Jerry Orbach	Nominated
1976	Tony Award	Best Actress in a Musical	Chita Rivera	Nominated
1976	Tony Award	Best Actress in a Musical	Gwen Verdon	Nominated
1976	Tony Award	Best Direction of a Musical	Bob Fosse	Nominated
1976	Tony Award	Best Choreography	Bob Fosse	Nominated
1976	Tony Award	Best Scenic Design	Tony Walton	Nominated
1976	Tony Award	Best Costume Design	Patricia Zipprodt	Nominated
1976	Tony Award	Best Lighting Design	Jules Fisher	Nominated
1976	Drama Desk Award	Outstanding Actor in a Musical	Jerry Orbach	Nominated
1976	Drama Desk Award	Outstanding Lighting Design	Jules Fisher	Won
1976	Grammy Award	Best Musical Theater Album		Nominated

=== Original London production ===
Year	Award Ceremony	Category	Nominee	Result
1979	Laurence Olivier Award	Best New Musical		Nominated
1979	Laurence Olivier Award	Best Actor in a Musical	Ben Cross	Nominated
1979	Laurence Olivier Award	Best Actress in a Musical	Antonia Ellis	Nominated

=== 1996 Broadway revival ===
Year	Award Ceremony	Category	Nominee	Result
1997	Drama Desk Award	Outstanding Revival of a Musical		Won
1997	Drama Desk Award	Outstanding Actor in a Musical	James Naughton	Nominated
1997	Drama Desk Award	Outstanding Actress in a Musical	Bebe Neuwirth	Won
1997	Drama Desk Award	Outstanding Featured Actor in a Musical	Joel Grey	Won
1997	Drama Desk Award	Outstanding Featured Actress in a Musical	Marcia Lewis	Nominated
1997	Drama Desk Award	Outstanding Choreography	Ann Reinking	Won
1997	Drama Desk Award	Outstanding Director of a Musical	Walter Bobbie	Won
1997	Drama Desk Award	Outstanding Lighting Design	Ken Billington	Won
1997	Tony Award	Best Revival of a Musical		Won
1997	Tony Award	Best Actor in a Musical	James Naughton	Won
1997	Tony Award	Best Actress in a Musical	Bebe Neuwirth	Won
1997	Tony Award	Best Featured Actress in a Musical	Marcia Lewis	Nominated
1997	Tony Award	Best Direction of a Musical	Walter Bobbie	Won
1997	Tony Award	Best Choreography	Ann Reinking	Won
1997	Tony Award	Best Costume Design	William Ivey Long	Nominated
1997	Tony Award	Best Lighting Design	Ken Billington	Won
1997	New York Drama Critics' Circle Award	Special Citation		Honored
1998	Grammy Award	Best Musical Theater Album		Won

=== 1997 London revival ===
Year	Award Ceremony	Category	Nominee	Result
1997	Laurence Olivier Award	Outstanding Musical Production		Won
1997	Laurence Olivier Award	Best Actor in a Musical	Henry Goodman	Nominated
1997	Laurence Olivier Award	Best Actress in a Musical	Ute Lemper	Won
1997	Laurence Olivier Award	Best Actress in a Musical	Ruthie Henshall	Nominated
1997	Laurence Olivier Award	Best Director	Walter Bobbie	Nominated
1997	Laurence Olivier Award	Best Theatre Choreographer	Ann Reinking	Nominated
1997	Laurence Olivier Award	Best Costume Design	William Ivey Long	Nominated
1999	Grammy Award	Best Musical Theater Album		Nominated
