= Nathaniel Jackson =

Nathaniel Jackson may refer to:

- Nathaniel E. Jackson (born 1972), American convicted murderer
- Nathaniel J. Jackson (1818–1892), American machinist and soldier

== See also ==
- Nathan Jackson (disambiguation)
