= Gnat (disambiguation) =

A gnat may be one of a variety of small insects.

Gnat or GNAT may also refer to:

- GNAT, a Free Software compiler for the Ada programming language
- Grand National Assembly of Turkey
- Gnat (surname)
- Gnat Computers, an early microcomputer company
- GNAT (torpedo), the Allied term for the German G7es homing torpedo
- Folland Gnat, a light jet fighter/trainer aircraft
- GNAT-750, an unmanned aerial vehicle
- "Gnat" (song), by Eminem from the 2020 album Music to Be Murdered By: Side B

== See also ==
- Gnats (disambiguation)
