= Anita Louise Combe =

Australian actress, singer, dancer

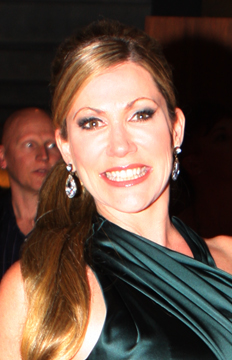

Anita Louise Combe is an Australian actress, singer, dancer who has worked extensively in the entertainment industry all around the world. Combe attended the Gwen Mackay School of Dancing and trained in the Cechetti method of ballet with Jennifer Pollard in Adelaide, South Australia before making her first professional appearance on stage as Sillabub in the Australian Premiere Production of Cats at the Theatre Royal in Sydney. She is one of the few people in the world to date who has played both roles of Roxie Hart and Velma Kelly in the production of Chicago in the West End. Anita created the role of Stephanie Mangano in the World Premiere Production of Saturday Night Fever opposite fellow Australian, Adam Garcia and produced by Adelaide born, Robert Stigwood.

== Personal life ==
Combe was born in Adelaide, South Australia. Her mother Rosemary was a nursing sister and her father John was an architect. She grew up with five brothers, two older and three younger. Her eldest brother, Scott, died in a car accident only months after her opening night in the musical Cats. Her main ambition was to become a ballet dancer, but after being cast in her first role in Cats she realised she wanted to expand her career into singing and acting also.

After playing roles such as Peron's Mistress in Evita, Sybil in Private Lives and Cosette in Les Misérables, all in Australia, Combe then made her West End debut in the world premiere production of Sunset Boulevard.

Anita has one daughter

== Career ==
=== Film and television ===
EastEnders, Rochelle, BBC, Dir: John Dower

The Royals (TV series), (Season 3) Lady Jane

Doctors, Laura Bowles Miller, BBC, Dir: Graham Sherrington

Holby City, Margarhita, BBC

Salsa Industry pilot, Gail, Luvchild Productions, Dir: Lorrie Sheehy/Kevin Ball

Rabbit Fever, Feature film by Stephen Raphael Sheila Tucker, Caught in the headlight prod., Dir: Ian Denyer

Silent Witness, Rachel Blake, BBC, Dir: Nick Renton

Belinda, Australian Film by Pamela Gibbons, Vicki, Dir: Pamela Gibbons

A Country Practice Guest Lead, Anna Collins, JNP FILMS

Home and Away Guest Lead, Shirley, Channel 7 network

G.P Guest Lead, Melanie Bloom, ABC Network

Ray Martin Midday Show, Guest appearances singing live, Channel 9 network

Good Morning Australia Guest appearances singing live

=== Theatre ===
Ragtime, Mother, Charing Cross Theatre London, 2016 Dir: Thom Southerland

Cats, Grizabella, UK Tour 2016 Dir: Trevor Nunn

Gypsy, Tessie Tura, Chichester Festival/Savoy Theatre 2014/15, Dir: Jonathan Kent

9to5, Roz Keith, UK tour, 2013, Dir: Jeff Calhoun

Saturday Night Fever, Stephanie Mangano (Original World Premiere Production), London Palladium, Dir: Arlene Phillips

Chorus Line, Cassie, Australian Production, 2013, Dir: Bayyork Lee

Starting Here, Starting Now, Victorian State Opera Melbourne, Dir: Andrew Mcbean

Stepping Out, Mavis Turner, Derby Playhouse, Dir: Stephen Dexter

Taking Steps Alan Ayckbourne, Elizabeth Crabbe, Gatehouse Theatre, London, Dir: Alex Holt

Private Lives Noël Coward, Sybil, Sydney Opera House, Dir: Peter Williams

Honeyspot Aust/aboriginal play by Jack Davis, Peggy, Canada/USA/Aust.[Elizabethan Theatre Trust], Dir: Richard Tulloch

Chicago (with David Hasselhoff), Velma Kelly, Adelphi Theatre, London, Dir: Scott Faris

Chicago (with Alyson Moyet & Marti Pellow), Roxie Hart, Adelphi Theatre, London, Dir: Scott Faris

Oscar (which famously closed after opening night!), Constance Lloyd, George Bernard Shaw Theatre, London, Dir: Mike Read

Hello Again London Premiere, The Actress, Bridewell Theatre, London, Dir: Clive Paget

Saturday Night Fever (musical), Created role of: Stephanie Mangano, London Palladium, Dir: Arlene Phillips

La Boheme World Premiere MTL production, Mimi, Dir: Tony Britten

Sunset Boulevard World Premiere Production, Betty Schaefer, Adelphi Theatre, London, Dir: Sir Trevor Nunn

Sunset Boulevard Canadian Premiere, Betty Schaefer, Toronto & Vancouver, Dir: Sir Trevor Nunn

Les Misérables, Cosette, Australian Production, Dir: Gayle Edwards

Evita, Peron's Mistress, State Theatre, Sydney, Dir: Tom Guerra

CATS Australian Premiere, Sillabub, Theatre Royal, Sydney, UK and European Tour, Grizabella Dir: Sir Trevor Nunn

Man of La Mancha, Fermina/Gypsy Dancer, Victorian State Opera, Melbourne, Dir: Graeme Murphy, George Fairfax

== Nominations ==
Green Room Awards, Australia - Best Actress in a Musical 'A Chorus Line'

Robert Helpmann Awards, Sydney - for Best Actress in a Musical 'A Chorus Line'

Dora Maver Moore Award, Toronto - for Best Supporting Actress in a musical ‘Sunset Boulevard’

Jessie Richardson Award, Vancouver - for Best Actress in a Musical ‘Sunset Boulevard’

WhatsOnstage Award, London – for Best Actress in a musical ‘Hello Again’

== Recordings ==
Gypsy, London Cast Recording

Saturday Night Fever, World Premiere Cast Recording

Sunset Boulevard, World Premiere Cast Recording

Sunset Boulevard, Canadian Cast Recording

A Chorus Line, BBC, Live Recording

Andrew Lloyd Webber Greatest Hits, Silva Screen Records

Cats, Australian Premiere Cast Recording

== Concerts ==
Rodgers & Hammerstein Concert, Guest singer, Israel Chamber Orchestra, CONDUCTOR: Martin Yates

Take That Concert, The Ultimate Tour, SJM Productions, Dir: Kim Gavin

Encore Concert, Guest Singer in Dubai, Creative Concerts Ltd

Rodgers & Hammerstein Concerts, Guest Singer, Bournemouth Symphony Orchestra

West End at Home Concert in Poole, Guest Singer, Creative Concerts Ltd

Summer Showstoppers Concert on the Isle of Wight, Guest Singer, Bournemouth Symphony Orchestra

Radio Broadway, Starring role, Various Concert Locations

Concert in Amsterdam with John Barrowman, CONDUCTOR: Martin Yates

A Chorus Line Concert, Bebe Benzenhiemer, BBC, BBC Big Band

Over the Threshold, Kate, Gatehouse Theatre, Dir: Nick Afka

White Christmas, Betty Haynes, Dir: Michael Blakemore

Helen of Troy Music/lyrics: Brian Johnson/Brendan Healy Athena/Dido/Cassandra Prince of Wales Theatre, London Gary Griffin Book/additional lyrics: Dick Clement/Ian La Frenais

== See also ==
Saturday Night Fever (musical)
