= Amra-Faye Wright =

South African stage actress (born 1960)

- Born: 22 August 1960 (age 65)
- Occupation: Stage actress
- Known for: Velma Kelly
- Spouse: Heinrich Kruse
- Children: 2

Amra-Faye Wright (born 22 August 1960) is a South African stage actress best known for portraying Velma Kelly in the musical Chicago, both on Broadway and in international tours. In 2010, she became the first actress to have performed the role both in English and in Japanese.

== Career ==
Wright has played the role of Velma Kelly frequently, first heading the 2001 UK national tour and later, the European tour and in productions of the musical every year since 2001 world-wide. Recipient of the Naledi and Fleur du Cap Awards for her performances in the South African production.

She continues to play this role alternating between London's West End and Broadway.

Wright began her professional career as a dancer in Sun City South Africa, appearing in several musical extravaganzas. In 1992, she played the role of "Sheila" in A Chorus Line at the Johannesburg Civic Theatre. Thereafter she starred in musical revues around the world working through agencies in Paris, Monte Carlo, and London.

In 1993, she performed at the Le Sporting in Monaco, dancing in shows for Whitney Houston, MC Hammer, Paul Anka and Donna Summer. In 1994 she returned to Monaco for two years to perform as a featured performer in the Cabaret at the Monte Carlo Casino.

Wright returned to South Africa in 1999 to create the principal role in Elvis Las Vegas, (director Andrew Botha) winning a Vita Award for most outstanding performance in Musical Theatre. In 2000 she played Sandy in Grease in the Johannesburg Stadium Spectacular, directed by David Gilmore.

She created the first of three one-woman shows, Rouge Pulp, in 2000 and won the Vita Award for Best Musical Performance. Drinks on Me followed in 2001 (Vita Award for Best Musical Performance, directed by Mark Hawkins) and It’s not Where I Start, in 2002.

Wright continues to perform as a stage actress, cabaret singer, and soloist at events around the world.

== Personal life ==
Wright was born in East London, South Africa. Her father, John Ball, was a long-distance runner, who held the record for running from Los Angeles to New York in 1972. Wright's early ambition was to be a ballet dancer and she trained for 16 years.

Wright has married twice, and has a daughter from each marriage. She is presently married to Heinrich Kruse, a South African drummer; they live in New York.

== Awards and nominations ==
- The Elvis Las Vegas Extravaganza: FNB Vita Award for Best Actress in Musical Theatre - 2000
- Rouge Pulp: FNB Vita Award for Best Performance in a Musical Revue - 2000
- Drinks on Me: FNB Vita Award for Best Performance in a Musical Revue - 2001
- It's Not Where I Start: FNB Vita Award nomination for Best Performance - 2002
- Nunsense: Durban Theatre Award for Best Actress In Musical Theatre - 2004
- Chicago: Naledi Theatre Award and Fleur du Cap Theatre Award for Best Actress in Musical Theatre - 2005
