= Nate (given name) =

Nate is a given name, frequently used as a diminutive of Nathan, Nathanael or Nathaniel.

== People ==
=== Arts and entertainment ===
- Nate Albert (born 1970), American musician best known as a guitarist for ska-core band The Mighty Mighty Bosstones
- Nate Barnes, American singer
- Nate Berkus (born 1971), American interior designer, author, TV host and television personality
- Nate Corddry (born 1977), American actor
- Nate Davenport (born 1987), British musician and drummer for Miss Vincent
- Nate Dogg (1969–2011), American rapper, singer, and actor
- Nate Kelley (born 1978), original drummer and backing vocalist for the progressive rock band Shabutie
- Nate Mooney (born 1971) American actor
- Nate Parker (born 1979), American actor and musical performer
- Nate Richert (born 1978), American actor and musician
- Nate Ruess (born 1982), American singer-songwriter and musician, best known as the lead vocalist of indie rock band Fun
- Nate Sib (born 2004), American musician best known for his feature on 2hollis' song Afraid

Nate Torrence (born 1977), American film and television actor and voiceover actor

- Nate Walcott (born 1978), American musical composer, arranger, and multi-instrumentalist

=== Politicians ===
- Nate Bell (born 1969), American politician
- Nate Douglas (born 2000), American politician and educator
- Nate Gentry (born 1975/6), American politician
- Nate Libby, American politician
- Nate Morris (born 1980), American businessman and political candidate
- Nate Steel, American politician

=== Sports ===
- Nate Adkins (born 1999), American football player
- Nate Allen (cornerback) (born 1948), former National Football League cornerback
- Nate Allen (safety) (born 1987), American football safety
- Nate Ament (born 2006), American basketball player
- Nate Archibald (born 1948), American Hall of Fame National Basketball Association player
- Nate Barragar (1906–1985), American collegiate and professional football player
- Nate Becker (born 1996), American football player
- Nate Blackwell (born 1965), American retired basketball player
- Nate Boerkircher (born 2001), American football player
- Nate Bowman (1943–1984), American basketball player
- Nate Brooks (American football) (born 1996), American football player
- Nate Burkey (born 1985), American-Filipino association football player
- Nate Byham (born 1988), American football tight end
- Nate Chandler (born 1989), American football offensive tackle
- Nate Clements (born 1979), American former National Football League player
- Nate Colbert (1946–2023), American baseball player
- Nate Collins (born 1987), American football defensive tackle
- Nate Darling (born 1998), Canadian basketball player
- Nate Davis (quarterback) (born 1987), American football quarterback
- Nate Davis (offensive lineman) (born 1996), American football player
- Nate Diaz (born 1985), American mixed martial artist and UFC fighter
- Nate Dusing (born 1978), American former competition swimmer, Olympic medalist and former world champion
- Nate Ebner (born 1998), American National Football League player and Olympic rugby player
- Nate Erdmann (born 1973), American former professional basketball player
- Nate Fish (born 1980), American baseball player and coach
- Nate Frazier (born 2004), American football player
- Nate Freiman (born 1986), American baseball player
- Nate Garner (born 1985), American football offensive tackle
- Nate George (born 2006), American baseball player
- Nate Grimes (born 1996), American basketball player in the Israeli Basketball Premier League
- Nate Hairston (born 1994), American football player
- Nate Hall (born 1996), American football player
- Nate Harvey (born 1996), American football player
- Nate Herbig (born 1994), American football player
- Nate Higgs, American/Spanish basketball player and coach
- Nate Hinton (born 1999), American basketball player
- Nate Hobbs (born 1999), American football player
- Nate Hobgood-Chittick (born 1974), American football player
- Nate Holland (born 1978), American snowboarder
- Nate Huffman (1975–2015), American basketball player
- Nate Hybl (born 1979), American football player
- Nate Irving (born 1988), American football player
- Nate Kaeding (born 1982), American football player
- Nate Kalepo (born 2001), American football player
- Nate Landman (born 1998), American football player
- Nate Laszewski (born 1999), American basketball player
- Nate Lavender (born 2000), American baseball player
- Nate Livings (born 1982), American football player
- Nate Lubell (1916–2006), American Olympic fencer
- Nate Marshall (born 2007), American football player
- Nate McCollum (born 2001), American football player
- Nate McCrary (born 1999), American football player
- Nate McLouth (born 1981), American baseball player
- Nate McMillan (born 1964), NBA coach
- Nate Meadors (born 1997), American football player
- Nate Miller (boxer) (born 1963), American boxer
- Nate Miller (defensive back) (born 1958), American football player
- Nate Miller (offensive lineman) (born 1971), American football player
- Nate Mulberg, American baseball coach
- Nate Noel (born 2002), American football running back
- Nate Odomes (born 1965), American football player
- Nate Ollie (born 1992), American football coach
- Nate Palmer (born 1989), American football linebacker
- Nate Potter (born 1988), American football offensive tackle
- Nate Roberts (skier) (born 1982), American freestyle skier
- Nate Robinson (born 1984), American professional basketball player
- Nate Schierholtz (born 1984), American professional baseball outfielder
- Nate Sestina (born 1997), American basketball player in the Israeli Basketball Premier League
- Nate Sheppard (born 2006), American football player
- Nate Silver (quarterback), American football player
- Nate Singleton (born 1968), American former football wide receiver
- Nate Smith (catcher) (1935–2019), retired American baseball player
- Nate Smith (golfer) (born 1983), American golfer
- Nate Solder (born 1988), American football offensive lineman
- Nate Stanley (born 1997), American football player
- Nate Stupar (born 1988), American football linebacker
- Nate Thurmond (1941–2016), American basketball player
- Nate Trewyn (born 1996), American football player
- Nate Turner (born 1969), American former football running back
- Nate Valcarcel (born 2002), American football safety
- Nate Washington (born 1983), American football wide receiver
- Nate Watt (1889–1968), American film director
- Nate Wayne (born 1975), American former football linebacker
- Nate Wozniak (born 1994), American football player
- Nate Yarnell (born 2002), American football player

=== Other professions ===
- Nate Dickinson (1932–2011), American biologist
- Nate Silver (born 1978), American statistician and writer

== Fictional characters ==
- Nate Bunce, a main antagonist of Fantastic Mr. Fox
- Nate Buxaplenty, character from the TV series The Fairly OddParents: Fairly Odder
- Nathan "Nate" Ford, the main character and "mastermind" in the action crime drama caper TV series Leverage
- Nate River in the manga series Death Note
- Nate N. Nickerson in NBC's The Office
- Nate Potato in the 2011 British animated short series Small Potatoes
- Nate Roberts in the British TV series The Bill
- Nate Runck, a character in That 90's Show
- Nate Salinger is a minor teen character in the American soap opera One Life to Live
- Nathan "Nate" Shelley, a character from the Apple TV+ show, Ted Lasso.
- Nate Tenbury-Newent in the British soap opera Hollyoaks
- Nate the Great, the main character of the children's detective stories series of the same name
- Nate Williamsen, a lead character in Nate and Hayes, a 1983 swashbuckling adventure film
- Nate Wright, the main character in the comic strip Big Nate
- Nathan Young in the British sci-fi TV show Misfits
- Uncle Nate, a character in 1998 American comedy movie My Giant

== See also ==
- Nat (disambiguation)
- Nate (disambiguation)
