= Natan =

Natan is a masculine given name, from which Nathan is derived, and a surname. It may refer to:

== Given name ==
- Natan Bernardo de Souza, also known as Natan (footballer, born 2001), Brazilian centre-back
- Natan Bernot (1931–2018), Yugoslav slalom canoeist
- Natan Brand (1944–1990), Israeli classical pianist
- Natan Carneiro de Lima (born 1990), also known as Natan (footballer, born 1990), Brazilian footballer
- Natan Eidelman (1930–1989), Soviet Russian author and historian
- Natan Gamedze (born 1963), Swazi convert to Judaism, Haredi rabbi and lecturer
- Natan Jurkovitz (born 1995), French-Swiss-Israeli basketball player
- Natan Mirov (born 1986), Russian rapper and TV presenter
- Natan Panz (1917–1948), Russian-born Jewish football player from Mandatory Palestine and Irgun member
- Natan Peled (1913–1992), Israeli politician
- Natan Rakhlin (1906–1979), Soviet orchestra conductor
- Natan or Nathan Rapoport (1911–1987), Polish Jewish sculptor and painter
- Natán Rivera (born 1998), Salvadoran pole vaulter
- Natan Rybak (1913–1978), Ukrainian poet and writer
- Natan Sharansky (born 1948), Soviet refusenik, Israeli politician, human rights activist and author
- Natan Slifkin (born 1975), British-born Israeli Orthodox rabbi, director of the Biblical Museum of Natural History in Beit Shemesh and controversial writer
- Natan Soledade Ayres (born 1999), Brazilian poet
- Natan Spigel (1886–1942), Polish-Jewish painter
- Natan Yonatan (1923–2004), Israeli poet
- Natan or Nathan Zach (1930–2020), Israeli poet

== Surname ==
- Bernard Natan (1886–1942), Franco-Romanian entrepreneur, film director and actor born Natan Tannenzaft
- Efrat Natan (born 1947), Israeli artist
- Émile Natan (1906–1962), Romanian-born French film producer, brother of Bernard Natan
- Shuli Natan (born 1947), Israeli singer

== See also ==
- Nattan (born 1998), Brazilian singer and songwriter
