= Nat (name) =

Nat is a unisex given name, a nickname and a surname. It is a nickname for Nathan, Nathanael, Nathaniel, Natalie, Natalia, or Natasha. It may refer to the following people:

== Given name or nickname ==
=== Men ===
- Nat Adderley (1931–2000), American jazz cornet and trumpet player
- Nat Adderley, Jr. (born 1955), American pop and rhythm and blues music arranger and pianist, son of the above
- Nat Ayer (1887–1952), American composer, pianist, singer and actor
- Nat Bailey (1902–1978), American-born Canadian restaurateur, founder of the White Spot restaurant chain
- Nat Bentham (1900–1975), English rugby league footballer
- Nat Brown (born 1981), English footballer
- Nathaniel Burbank (1838–1901), American humorist, drama critic, and newspaper editor
- Nat King Cole (1919–1965), American singer and jazz pianist
- Nat Faxon (born 1975), American actor, comedian and Academy Award-winning screenwriter
- Nat Fyfe (born 1991), Australian rules footballer
- Nat Gonella (1908–1998), English jazz trumpeter, bandleader, vocalist and mellophonist
- Nat Hentoff (1925–2017), American historian, novelist, jazz and country music critic and syndicated columnist
- Nat Hickey (1902–1979), American basketball and minor league baseball player and coach
- Nat Hiken (1914–1968), American radio and television writer, producer and songwriter
- Nat Holman (1896–1995), American early professional basketball player and innovator, member of the Basketball Hall of Fame
- Nat Lofthouse (1925–2011), English footballer
- Nat Love (1854-1921), African-American cowboy and freed slave
- Nat Militzok (1923–2009), American basketball player who played in the first National Basketball Association game
- Nat Moore (born 1951), American retired National Football League player
- Nat Pendleton (1895-1967), American actor and Olympic wrestler
- Nat Perrin (1905–1998), American comedy writer
- Nat Pierce (1925-1992), American jazz pianist, composer and arranger
- Nat Quansah, botanist from Ghana
- Nat Rogers (1893-1981), American baseball player in the Negro leagues
- Nat Shapiro (1922-1983), American jazz writer and record producer
- Nat Mayer Shapiro (1919-2005), American visual artist
- Nat Simon (1900–1979), American composer, pianist, bandleader and songwriter
- Nat Stuckey (1933-1988), American country music singer
- Nat Towles (1905–1963), African-American musician and jazz and big band leader
- Nat Turner (1800-1831), African-American slave who led a rebellion of slaves and free blacks
- Nat Walton (1866–1930), English international footballer
- Nat Wolff (born 1994), American actor and lead singer for the TV series The Naked Brothers Band
- Nat Young (born 1947), Australian surfer and author
- Nat of the YouTube channel Nat's What I Reckon, Australian who refuses to disclose his surname

=== Women ===
- Nat Cook, Australian politician first elected in 2022
- Nat Exon (born 1992), Australian rules footballer
- Nat Grider (born 2000), Australian rules footballer
- Nat Puff (born 1996), American singer-songwriter and comedian
- Nat Sciver-Brunt (born 1992), English cricketer

== Surname ==
- Marie-José Nat (1940–2019), French film and television actress
- Yves Nat (1890–1956), French pianist and composer

== See also ==
- Nate (given name)
