= Gnat (surname) =

Gnat is a surname. Notable people with this surname include:

- Ashleigh Gnat (born 1994), American gymnast
- Edward Gnat (1940–2021), Polish politician
- Rodney Gnat (born 1987), American football player
