= Barnathan =

Barnathan is an old Judean surname. It's the Germanicized form of the Aramaic surname Bar-Natan, and it comes from the words bar בר meaning 'son' or 'son of', and the biblical Hebrew name Natan or Natanel. Notable people with the surname include:

- Dakota Barnathan (born 1994), American soccer player
- Julius Barnathan, (1927–1997), American broadcast engineer
- Michael Barnathan, American film producer
