= Korhites =

Levitical family descended from Korah

The Korhites in the Bible were a Levitical family descended from Korah (Exodus 6:24; 1 Chronicles 12:6; 26:1; 2 Chronicles 20:19).
