= Nathan Kenny =

New Zealand evolutionary-genomics researcher

Nathan J Kenny
- Citizenship: New Zealand
- Education: University of Otago (BA, DipLang, BSc Hons); University of Oxford (DPhil)
- Known for: Genomic studies of green-lipped mussels and other invertebrates
- Awards: Rutherford Discovery Fellowship (2020); Marie Skłodowska-Curie Individual Fellowship (2017)
- Scientific career
- Fields: Evolutionary genomics; comparative genomics; evolutionary developmental biology
- Workplaces: University of Otago; Oxford Brookes University; Chinese University of Hong Kong; Natural History Museum, London
- Thesis: (2014)

Nathan James Kenny is a New Zealand evolutionary‐genomics scientist. He is a senior lecturer in the Department of Biochemistry at the University of Otago, where he leads research on the molecular basis of climate-change resilience in the green-lipped mussel (Perna canaliculus).

== Early life and education ==
Kenny grew up mainly in Christchurch, and traces whakapapa to Te Ātiawa and Ngāi Tahu. He completed a BA in Philosophy, a Diploma in German, and a BSc (Hons) in Genetics at the University of Otago, graduating in 2009. In 2014 he earned a DPhil in Zoology from St Cross College, University of Oxford.

== Career ==
After his doctorate Kenny undertook post-doctoral research at the Chinese University of Hong Kong. In 2017 he received a Marie Skłodowska-Curie Individual Fellowship to work at the Natural History Museum, London, investigating genomic adaptation in sponges. He later joined Oxford Brookes University, applying single-cell sequencing to regenerative biology. In September 2021 Kenny returned to New Zealand as a lecturer (now senior lecturer) in Otago’s Department of Biochemistry.

== Research ==
Kenny’s work combines genomic sequencing, single-cell transcriptomics and comparative phylogenetics to understand how invertebrates diversify, develop and adapt to environmental extremes. His Rutherford Discovery Fellowship project, awarded in 2020, tracks the genetic basis of thermal and acidification resilience in juvenile and larval stages of the taonga species P. canaliculus.

=== Selected publications ===
In 2025 Kenny co-authored a Nature Communications article that produced a single-cell atlas of the colonial cnidarian Hydractinia. His recent work also includes studies on multi-stressor impacts on juvenile green-lipped mussels, and on single-cell atlases of spider and annelid development.

== Awards and honours ==
2017 – Marie Skłodowska-Curie Individual Fellowship (European Commission)

2020 – Rutherford Discovery Fellowship (Royal Society Te Apārangi)
