= Nathaniel Jacobson =

American painter

"The Survivors" by Nathaniel Jacobson, polymer on canvas, 1957

Nathaniel J. Jacobson (1916–1996) was an American artist, educator and color theorist based in Boston. He began his studies Museum of Fine Arts School, followed by the Massachusetts School of Art. After graduating in 1938, Jacobson enrolled in Yale University's School of the Fine Arts, receiving his BFA in 1941. Jacobson enlisted in the army in 1943 and after serving, the themes of his paintings turned towards his experience in Europe during World War II.

Jacobson found early success as a painter when his paintings were exhibited at the Carnegie Institute in 1941 as part of its exhibition "Directions in American Painting." Subsequently, his work was shown in New York at the Macbeth Gallery and the Gallery of Modern Art as well as The Arts Club of Chicago and Today's Art Gallery in Boston.

As a student of Anna Hathaway, a follower of Albert Munsell, he developed his interest in color theory. In 1975 Jacobson published a popular middle school and high school art textbook, The Sense of Color. Jacobson went on to work as a research associate at MIT, studying computer modeling of color combinations and exploring the human response to color. In 2007, Jacobson was the subject of a retrospective exhibit "Color Demands a Response" at Hebrew College in Boston, where his painting "The Survivors" (right) is part of the College's permanent art collection.

In 1956 Jacobson travelled to Israel. The light and color he witnessed there transformed his work. He wrote, "Israel opened up ideas of color and light to me. There I found the extraordinary challenge of the brilliant light and how I could fit that into paint. My response to the light of Israel, and especially to the Negev, required a renovation of my palette. The light was abstract. The truth of it was the brilliance, and the fact that there was color only in the shadows."

Major exhibitions in Jerusalem, New York City and Boston followed. In 1958, he had solo shows at the DeCordova Museum in Lincoln, Massachusetts, and the Jewish Museum in New York City. Dorothy Adlow reviewed DeCordova exhibit for The Christian Science Monitor: "These pictures of Israel express almost spectacularly the painter's reaction to the country and the people.... Sometimes the colors run to a ravishing brilliance.... Here is a genuinely exalted communication." His paintings can be found in public collections including Hebrew College and the Museum of Fine Arts, Boston.
