= Nathan Robinson =

Nathan Robinson may refer to:

- Nathan Robinson (ice hockey) (born 1981), Canadian ice hockey forward
- Nathan Robinson (politician) (1828–1902), member of London County Council
- Nathan J. Robinson (born 1989), British-American writer and editor-in-chief of Current Affairs
- Nathan J. Robinson (biologist), British marine biologist
