= Nat, Punjab =

Nat
- Village
- Location in Punjab, India Nat (India)
- Coordinates: 31.0841487°N 75.5487725°E
- Country: India
- State: Punjab
- District: Jalandhar

Government
  - Type: Panchayat raj
  - Body: Gram panchayat
- Elevation: 240 m (790 ft)

Population (2011)
  - Total: 980
- Sex ratio 492/488 ♂/♀

Languages
  - Official: Punjabi
- Time zone: UTC+5:30 (IST)
- PIN: 144039
- ISO 3166 code: IN-PB
- Vehicle registration: PB- 08
- Website: jalandhar.nic.in

Nat, or Natt, is a village in Jalandhar district of Punjab State, India. It is located 4 km from Nurmahal, 33 km from district headquarter Jalandhar and 136 km from state capital Chandigarh. The village is administrated by a sarpanch who is an elected representative of village as per Panchayati raj (India).

== Demography ==
According to the report published by Census India in 2011, Nat has a total number of 201 houses and population of 980 of which include 492 males and 488 females. Literacy rate of Nat is 69.41%, lower than state average of 75.84%. The population of children under the age of 6 years is 94 which is 9.59% of total population of Nat, and child sex ratio is approximately 880 higher than state average of 846.

Most of the people are from Schedule Caste which constitutes 55.71% of total population in Nat. The town does not have any Schedule Tribe population so far.

As per census 2011, 315 people were engaged in work activities out of the total population of Nat which includes 291 males and 24 females. According to census survey report 2011, 97.78% workers describe their work as main work and 2.22% workers are involved in marginal activity providing livelihood for less than 6 months.

== Transport ==
Nurmahal railway station is the nearest train station; however, Phagwara Junction train station is 30 km away from the village. The village is 51 km away from domestic airport in Ludhiana and the nearest international airport is located in Chandigarh also Sri Guru Ram Dass Jee International Airport is the second nearest airport which is 128 km away in Amritsar.
