= Nathan Dixon =

Nathan Dixon may refer to:

- Nathan F. Dixon I (1774–1842), United States senator
- Nathan F. Dixon II (1812–1881), United States representative
- Nathan F. Dixon III (1847–1897), U.S. representative and senator
- Nathan Dixon, a film with Barry Bell
