= Natanael (given name) =

Natanael is a given name. Notable people with the name include:

- Natanael Beskow (1865-1953), Swedish theologian
- Natanael Berg (1879-1957), Swedish composer
- Natanael Gärde (1880–1968), Swedish judge and politician
- Natanael de Sousa Santos Júnior (born 1985), known as Júnior Santos, Brazilian football striker
- Natanael (footballer, born 1990), full name Natanael Batista Pimenta, Brazilian football leftback
- Natanael (footballer, born 2002), full name Natanael Moreira Milouski, Brazilian football defender
