= Nathan Jackson (disambiguation) =

Nathan Jackson (born 1938) is an American Tlingit artist.

Nathan or Nate Jackson may also refer to:

- Nathan Louis Jackson (1978–2023), American screenwriter and playwright
- Nate Jackson (American football) (born 1979), American writer and former football player
- Nate Jackson (comedian) (born 1983), American comedian and actor
- Nathan Jackson, character in the TV series The Magnificent Seven

== See also ==
- Nathaniel Jackson (disambiguation)
