= NATS =

Nats or NATS may refer to:

== Politics ==
- National Party (South Africa) and its supporters
- National Party of Australia and its supporters
- New Zealand National Party and its supporters
- Scottish National Party and its supporters

== Sports ==
- Syracuse Nationals, an NBA team currently known as the Philadelphia 76ers
- Washington Nationals, the current baseball team in Washington, DC
  - Washington Nationals (disambiguation), any of a number of historical baseball teams
- nAts (born 2002), professional Valorant player
- Nats Park
- Nats Xtra
- Raleigh Nats
- Vancouver Nats, an ice hockey team from British Columbia, Canada

== Aviation ==
- NATS Holdings, formally National Air Traffic Services, the United Kingdom's main Air Navigation Service Provider
- North Atlantic Tracks
- Naval Air Transport Service, a branch of the United States Navy from 1941 to 1948

== Other uses ==
- Nat (unit), a unit of information
- Nat (spirit), in Burmese religion
- Nat caste, a social group of India
- NATS Messaging, an open source messaging (message oriented middleware) system
- National Association of Teachers of Singing, a professional organization for singing teachers
- Next-Generation Administration and Tracking System, an affiliate program backend
- Nihon Automobile High Technical School (Japanese Wikipedia)
- Nissan Anti-Theft System
- North Avenue Trade School

== See also ==
- Nat (disambiguation)
- Young Nationals (disambiguation)
- Gnat
