= Nathan Baskind =

Jewish-American World War II soldier identified and reburied in 2024

Nathan B. Baskind
- Nathan Baskind
- Born: Nathan B. Baskind; June 1, 1916; Pittsburgh, Pennsylvania, United States
- Died: June 23, 1944 (aged 28); Near Cherbourg, Normandy, France
- Burial place: Normandy American Cemetery, Colleville-sur-Mer, France
- Military career
- Allegiance: United States
- Branch: United States Army
- Service years: 1942–1944
- Rank: First Lieutenant
- Nickname: Nate
- Unit: 899th Tank Destroyer Battalion
- Conflicts: World War II
- Awards: Purple Heart European–African–Middle Eastern Campaign Medal; World War II Victory Medal Honorable Service Lapel Button WWII

Nathan 'Nate' B. Baskind (1916 – June 23, 1944) was a Jewish-American officer in the United States Army's 899th Tank Destroyer Battalion who served during World War II. He was killed in action near Cherbourg, Normandy, 17 days after the D-Day landings. Baskind's remains were unidentified for decades until advances in DNA technology led to his identification, after eighty years, in 2024. He was reburied with military and Jewish honors at the Normandy American Cemetery in June 2024, the cemetery’s first full military honors and burial in complete compliance with Jewish law.

== Early life and background ==
Baskind was born in 1916 in Pittsburgh, Pennsylvania, to a Jewish family of Eastern European immigrants who settled in Pittsburgh. He was the son of Abraham 'Abe' Baskind and Lena Shapiro. He grew up in Pittsburgh’s Squirrel Hill neighborhood, and was managing two branches of the family's business before joining the army. Baskind was drafted in the United States Army during the early years of World War II. He served in the 899th Tank Destroyer Battalion, commanding a platoon of M10 tank destroyers.

== Military service and death ==
Baskind was drafted in the Army in 1942. He landed at Utah Beach as part of the D-Day invasion on June 6, 1944. On June 22, 1944, he was ambushed near La Hague while scouting ahead of his unit. He was wounded by German machine gun fire and captured. Treated initially at a Luftwaffe hospital in Cherbourg, Baskind succumbed to his injuries the following day, June 23, 1944. With Cherbourg under imminent American control, Baskind's body was interred in a local mass grave alongside German soldiers at the Cherbourg Community Cemetery.

Post-war efforts to locate Baskind's remains were unsuccessful. His father wrote to the army for years after the war inquiring about his son. He was told in July 1949, by Lieutenant Colonel W.E. Campbell, (Note: From the Army's Memorial Division.) that the remains of his son "were unrecoverable". In 1957, his identification tag were found by the German War Graves Commission (Volksbund Deutsche Kriegsgräberfürsorge) during a relocation of graves to the German military cemetery at Marigny, France. However, the remains could not be separated or identified at the time.

== Rediscovery and reburial ==
The rediscovery of Baskind's remains began in 2019, when British guide Matt Key, conducting tours of D-Day sites, learned of Baskind’s story from a family member. Together with fellow guide Sean Claxton, Key investigated Baskind's fate, consulting archives and confirming his name on records at the Marigny cemetery.

In 2022, American genealogist Eric Feinstein accidentally found Baskind's name on the German War Graves Commission website and contacted Shalom Lamm, Chief Historian of Operation Benjamin, a nonprofit dedicated to honoring Jewish-American service members who were mistakenly buried under Latin Crosses in WW1 and WW2, and correcting the errors by replacing the crosses with Stars of David.

Operation Benjamin sought the assistance of the German ambassador to Israel, Steffen Seibert, to get permission to exhume the mass grave in search of Baskind. After obtaining guidance from Jewish religious authorities, permission from the French government, and in close partnership with the German War Graves Commission, Operation Benjamin organized the exhumation of remains at Marigny in December 2023.

== Identification process ==
The team of German, French, and American experts who exhumed his remains from the mass grave faced significant challenges. (Note: Erin Sweeney McBride, the vice president of forensic operations at Bode Technology, explained. "The level of degradation, and things like water, sun, or bacteria all degrade DNA. In this case, we were worried about the water table in the grave and the bacteria, as well as the age.") Among thousands of bones, American and French anthropologists and forensic experts identified potential remains of Baskind based on bone lengths. Samples of those bones were analyzed by Bode Technologies in the US through mitochondrial and Y-chromosome DNA testing. Relatives, including his great-niece Samantha Baskind, (Note: Samantha Baskind, Distinguished Professor of Art History at Cleveland State University, is an American Jewish art historian and a scholar of Jewish cultural studies. She serves as Series Editor of Dimyonot: Jews and the Cultural Imagination and Museums Correspondent for Smithsonian Magazine.) provided DNA samples for comparison. By February 2024, the identification was confirmed by Bode, and official US government confirmation was subsequently confirmed by the Defense POW/MIA Accounting Agency (DPAA).

== Reburial ceremony and legacy ==
On June 23, 2024, 80 years to the day after his death, Baskind was reburied at the Normandy American Cemetery in Colleville-sur-Mer, under a headstone marked with the Star of David. His reburial was one of the rare new interments at the cemetery and the first conducted in accordance with Jewish traditions.

The ceremony was attended by military officials, dignitaries, and Baskind's family. A rosette was placed next to Baskind's name on the memorial wall of the cemetery to indicate he was no longer missing. This was the first time in the cemetery’s history that next of kin, Samantha Baskind, rather than cemetery staff, placed the rosette next to a fallen soldier’s name.

Transfer of the remains of 1Lt. Baskind to the 21st TSC mortuary affairs team by the German War Graves Commission on May 28, 2024 during a ceremony at Landstuhl Regional Medical Center, Germany.

Word of his rescue from obscurity spread. In the village in which 1Lt. Baskind was ambushed just outside of Cherbourg, a memorial plaque has been placed recounting the story of his wounding, death and discovery, and a similar memorial was unveiled in New Castle, Pennsylvania, the city where Baskind had worked until he entered the Army. The German War Graves Commission is developing a memorial and interactive education site at the Marigny German War Cemetery, commemorating the life, sacrifice and saga of 1Lt. Nathan Baskind.

June 5, 2025, General Dirk fulfilled a commitment to honor 1st Lt. Nathan B. Baskind at the Marigny German War Cemetery. The German War Graves Commission installed an interactive knowledge board about many of the soldiers buried in this WWII German war cemetery, including the story of Nathan B. Baskind. More significantly, they created a small designated theater with a movie about Nathan Baskind including and especially his Jewish roots.

== Family ==
Baskind's great niece, Samantha Baskind, wrote an opinion piece on the event for CNN.

== See also ==
- Normandy American Cemetery
- American Battle Monuments Commission
