= Nathan King =

Nathan King may refer to:

- Nathan King (curler) (born 1999), Canadian curler
- Nathan King (musician) (born 1970), English musician
- Nathan King (singer-songwriter) (born 1978), New Zealand singer-songwriter
- Nathan King, paternal great-grandfather of African-American civil rights activist Martin Luther King Jr.
