= Nottingham Asphalt Tester =

The Nottingham Asphalt Tester (NAT) is equipment used for rapid determination of modulus, permanent deformation and fatigue of bituminous mixtures. It uses cylindrical specimens that are cored from the highway or prepared in laboratory.

These mechanical properties are essential to people involved in the production of roads and the development of materials used in road construction. NATs are used across the world by materials testing laboratories, universities, oil companies, regional laboratories, contractors and consulting engineers.

The NAT was invented in the 1980s at the University of Nottingham by Keith Cooper, who later founded Cooper Research Technology Ltd.
