= Nathan Thomas =

Nathan Thomas may refer to:

- Nathan Thomas (water polo) (born 1972), Australian water polo player
- Nathan Thomas (rugby union) (born 1976), Welsh rugby union footballer
- Nathan Thomas (footballer) (born 1994), English footballer
- Nate Thomas (born 2001), American football player
