= Nathan Keonaona Chai =

American novelist

- Education: Brigham Young University
- Occupation: Novelist
- Spouse: Mary
- Children: 2

Nathan Keonaona Chai is an American novelist known for having written Fire Creek (2005), which was turned into the film Fire Creek, for which he also wrote the screenplay.

Chai was raised in Salt Lake City, Utah. He studied at Brigham Young University (BYU), receiving both a bachelor's degree in then a masters in English with an emphasis in creative writing. He also worked as an editorial intern with BYU Magazine.

Chai currently teaches English at BYU. He has written several short stories, one of which was published in Dialogue: A Journal of Mormon Thought. In 2001 and 2002 Chai won honorable mention in the Stony Brook Short fiction contest.

Chai and his wife Mary live in Orem, Utah, with their two children.
