= Julius Barnathan =

American television broadcast engineer

- Born: January 22, 1927; The Bronx, New York, U.S.
- Died: December 1, 1997 (aged 70); Roslyn, New York, U.S.
- Education: Brooklyn College (BA, 1951)
- Alma mater: Columbia University (MA, 1954)
- Occupations: Broadcast executive, Engineer
- Organization: ABC
- Known for: Closed captioning, Slow motion replay technology, Handheld camera development
- Title: President of Broadcast Operations and Engineering
- Awards: Emmy Award for Lifetime Achievement (1994); NAB Distinguished Service Award (1982)

Julius Barnathan (January 22, 1927 – December 1, 1997) was an American broadcast engineer. Barnathan was President of Broadcast Operations and Engineering for American Broadcasting Company (ABC). During his 40 years at ABC, he was responsible for many technical developments in the television industry, including the use of handheld and miniature cameras at sports events and closed captioned programs for the deaf. He is also credited with helping to adapt slow-motion technology to color cameras, develop the use of long-lens cameras to capture sports events that take place over great distances, and introduce the use of small square inset pictures behind news anchors.

== Awards and recognitions ==
- National Academy of Television Arts and Sciences - The Silver Circle, 1996
- NAB Engineering Achievement Award - April 13, 1982
- National Academy of Television Arts and Sciences - The Trustees Awards, 1984-1985
