= Inez Nathaniel-Walker =

African-American folk artist

- Born: Inez Stedman; 1911; Sumter, South Carolina, U.S.
- Died: May 25, 1990 (aged 78–79); Willard, New York, U.S.
- Known for: folk artist

Inez Nathaniel-Walker (née Stedman) (1911-May 25, 1990) was a self-taught African-American folk artist.

== Biography ==
Born into poverty in Sumter, South Carolina, Inez was orphaned at an early age, and married at 12 or 13. She moved to Philadelphia during the Great Migration to escape the harsh reality of intense farm work. In 1949, she moved to Port Byron, New York, where she worked in an apple processing plant. She was convicted of criminally negligent homicide after killing a man who abused her and imprisoned in Bedford Hills Correctional Prison from 1971 to 1973. After her prison sentence, she moved back to Port Byron. It was during her incarceration that she began to draw on the back of any paper she found to distance herself from the inmates who she called the "bad girls." She drew prolifically, filling dozens of notebooks in a few months until her release.

Nathaniel Walker died of pancreatic cancer on May 25, 1990.

== Career ==
While incarcerated, Nathaniel-Walker's work attracted the attention of Elizabeth Bayley, one of Inez' prison teachers, who provided her with drawing paper, notebooks, and pencils. Mrs. Bayley also showed the drawings to a local folk art dealer, who later received the artist's sketch books.

Nathaniel-Walker's drawings are almost exclusively portraits of women. The works, executed in color pen, pencil, and ink, are characterized by a great profusion of embellished detail. The faces are shown in strict frontal or profile view with exaggerated eyes. The figures often wear clothes that were part of Inez's wardrobe. Of her process she said, "I don't look at nothing to draw by. I can't look at nobody and draw. I just draw by my own mission. I just sit down and start drawing."

Her work has been shown at the Akron Art Institute, the Corcoran Gallery, and Musée Art et Marges in Brussels. Several of her drawings were also featured in the landmark exhibition, "Black Folk Art in America: 1930-1980." Her work is currently held in several prominent museum collections including the Smithsonian American Art Museum, the American Folk Art Museum, the University of Michigan Museum of Art, and the High Museum.
