= Fire Creek (2006 film) =

- Theatrical poster
- Directed by: Jed Wells
- Written by: Nathan Keonaona Chai
- Produced by: Dennis Packard; Charles Cranney; Seth Packard; Raymond Robinson
- Starring: Seth Packard; John Cannon; Kim Abunuwara; Dayne Rockwood; Melinda Lockwood; Adam Daveline
- Cinematography: Jed Wells
- Edited by: Russ Lasson
- Music by: Jay Packard
- Production companies: Campus Studios; Brigham Young University iTunes
- Distributed by: Campus Studios; Third North Distribution i
- Release dates: September 2006 (Temecula Valley); May 8, 2009 (United States)
- Country: United States
- Language: English
- Budget: $100,000

Fire Creek is a 2006 independent film released theatrically by Brigham Young University. The film was released digitally for select Cinemark theaters in Utah, May 8, 2009.

== Plot ==
Fire Creek tells the story of a young marine's search for an answer to the age-old question "why do bad things happen to good people?" Jason is serving as a marine in Afghanistan when divine intervention saves him from a sniper attack. However, his closest friend, a devoted husband and father, is shot and killed just inches away. Critically wounded but alive, Jason returns home wondering why his life was spared. The rest of the film follows his search for answers.

== Production ==
The film was produced by a Brigham Young University mentoring group of faculty and staff. The writer for the project, Nathan Chai, developed the novel, and later the screenplay, from his award-winning short story, "Creekwater Bends." Pre-production of the film was worked out in a philosophy and film class taught by Dennis Packard, Raymond Robinson, and Charles Cranney. The director and cinematographer, Jed Wells, was an undergraduate photography student with a background in acting and directing. The lead actor, Seth Packard, was a philosophy major who co-produced the film and went on to direct his own films, HottieBoombaLottie and So Hot It Hurts, which is currently in negotiation with distributors. The composer, Jay Packard, was a music and physics undergraduate major and a computer engineering graduate major. The music performers included a number of BYU students, as well as Larry Green on guitar and Lloyd Miller on Middle Eastern instruments.

== Release ==
Fire Creek was released digitally for select theaters in Utah May 8, 2009. It is now available on iTunes.
