= Nathan Phillips =

Nathan Phillips is the name of:

- Nathan Phillips (politician) (1892–1976), Canadian politician
- Nathan Phillips Square, the plaza in front of Toronto, Ontario's City Hall named in honour of the above
- Nathan Phillips (actor) (born 1980), Australian actor
- Nathan Phillips (activist) (born 1954), Native American political activist and member of the Omaha people

== See also ==
- Nat Phillips (born 1997), English footballer with Liverpool F.C.
