= Nathan Kiley =

English stage actor (born 1981)

Nathan Kiley (born 2 April 1981 as Nathan Kiely) is an English stage actor who has starred in the West End production of Chicago as Mary Sunshine at the Cambridge Theatre, and as Tony Blair in Tony Blair the Musical, performed at the 2007 Edinburgh Fringe.

== Personal life ==
Nathan was raised in Boroughbridge, a small town near York, North Yorkshire, where he grew up with his twin sister. He attended St John Fisher RC High School in Harrogate where he was involved in school productions before attending Durham University where he gained a 2:1 in English Literature. He undertook formal stage training at Guildford School of Acting where he graduated with a First in Musical Theatre.

== Performing career ==
Kiley played a singing Tony Blair in Tony Blair the Musical in 2007. In "Crystal Balls" at the Brighton Fringe Festival Kiley has a double lead role as the character Topsie Redfern and as himself. He played the lead character, Mary Sunshine, in the musical Chicago, as choreographed by Bob Fosse, on international tour.

== List of performances ==
Year	Role	Show	Venue
2023	Milky Linda	Jack and the Beanstalk	Theatre Royal Stratford East
2009–2010	Ugly Sister	Cinderella	Grand Theatre, Wolverhampton
2009	Mary Sunshine	Chicago (musical)	Cambridge Theatre
2009	Jonathan	Edges: A New Song Cycle	Union Theatre, Southwark
2008–2009	Prince Charming	Cinderella	Towngate Theatre, Basildon
2008	Billy	Anything Goes	Cambridge Arts Theatre
2008	Peep Bo/Yum Yum	All-Male Mikado	Union Theatre, Southwark
2008	Vocalist	Notes From New York	Scottish Widow
2008	Balladeer	Assassins	The Landor Theatre
2008	Jimmy	The Marilyn Monroe Show	The Parlure Spiegletent, Brighton
2008	Coach Bloc/Robot	Wonderboy	Workshop
2008	Stephen	Speed Dating: The Musical	Jermyn Street Theatre
2007	Lead Player	Christmas In An Hour	Jermyn Street Theatre
2007	Edward II	Edward II	The Rose Theatre Site, Bankside
2007	Vocalist	Notes From New York	Scottish Widow
2007	Tony Blair	Tony Blair The Musical	Gilded Balloon, Edinburgh
2007	Master Bardell	Bardell v's Pickwick	Middle Temple Hall
2007	Chorus	Henry V	Battersea Arts Centre
2006	Aladdin	Aladdin	The Broadway Theatre, Barking
2006	Achilles	Achilles in Heels	Landor Theatre
2006	Various	Out & Out: A Closet Drama	Cockpit Theatre
2006	Bad Boy	Bad Boy Boogie	Student Film
2005	Lead Tenor	The 12 Tenors	Windsor Theatre Royal (Also appearing on Dutch TV Christmas special)
2005	Soloist/Ensemble	Hiss and Boo VE Day Celebration	Greenwich Theatre
2005	Gilbert Blythe	Anne of Green Gables	GSA
2005	Fakir and Browning	Side Show	GSA
2004–2005	Man 2	I Love You, You're Perfect, Now Change	GSA
2004–2005	Singer	GSA Singers	GSA
2004–2005	Jesus	Godspell	GSA
2004	Roderigo	Othello	GSA
2004	Martin	Candide	GSA
