= Edward Gnat =

Polish politician (1940–2021)

Edward Gnat (1 March 1940 – 6 January 2021) was a Polish politician.

== Biography ==
He served as a Member of the Sejm from 1985–1989 and from 1993–1997. Gnat was born in Maurzyce, and died in Łódź, aged 80, of COVID-19 during the COVID-19 pandemic in Poland.
