= Nathan Wood =

Nathan Wood may refer to:

- Nathan Wood (rugby league) (born 1972), Australian rugby league player
- Nathan Wood (cricketer) (born 1974), English cricketer
- Nathan Wood (footballer, born 1997), Welsh footballer
- Nathan Wood (footballer, born 2002), English footballer

== See also ==
- Nathan Wood House, Westminster, Massachusetts
