= All That Jazz (song) =

Show tune from the musical Chicago

"All That Jazz" is a song from the 1975 musical Chicago, with music and lyrics by songwriting team Kander and Ebb. It serves as the opening number for both the stage production and the 2002 film adaptation.

The 1979 film All That Jazz, starring Roy Scheider as a character strongly resembling choreographer, stage and film director, Bob Fosse, takes its title from the song.

== Composition ==
Opus, Book 3 by Rob Blythe notes the song uses the 7th chord to create a unique musical effect.

== Analysis ==
Popular Culture: Introductory Perspectives postulated that the song encapsulated the "importance of jazz in the constitution of pop culture". Author Linda Cahir describes it as a "cynical comment on the willingness of humans...to act solely, simply, and remorselessly in their own interest", and deeming this unlawful conduct as part of "all that jazz" one needs to get by. In a review for BlueCoupe, Tony Buchsbaum said "the ghost of Bob Fosse hangs about" in the song.

== See also ==
- Lucky Lindy – American aviator (1902–1974)
- Jazz Age – American period in the 1920s and 1930s
- Sheba – 1920s women's subculture; alternative term for flapper
