= Belva Gaertner =

American acquitted of murder

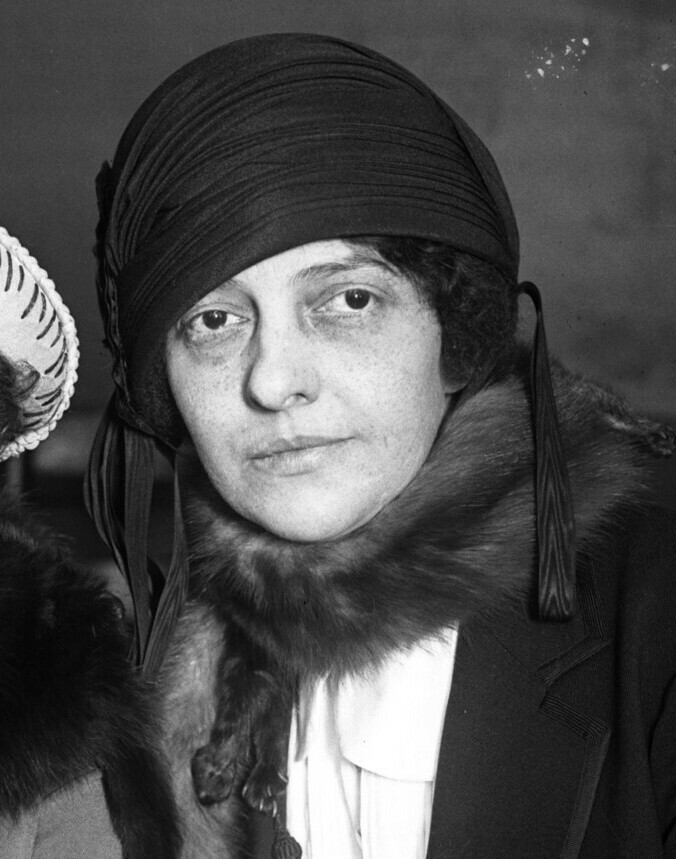
- Gaertner in 1924
- Born: Belva Eleanora Boosinger; September 14, 1884; Litchfield, Illinois, U.S.
- Died: May 14, 1965 (aged 80); Pasadena, California, U.S.
- Other name: Belle Brown
- Known for: Inspiration for Velma Kelly in Chicago
- Spouses: William Gaertner (m. 1917; div. 1917) (m. 1925; died 1948)

Belva Eleanora Gaertner (née Boosinger; September 14, 1884 – May 14, 1965) was an American woman who was acquitted of murder in a 1924 trial. She inspired the character of Velma in the 1926 play Chicago created by Maurine Dallas Watkins; Watkins reported on the trial for the Chicago Tribune. The Velma character became Velma Kelly in the 1975 musical based on the play.

== Early life ==
Gaertner was born Belva Eleanora Boosinger on September 14, 1884, in Litchfield, Illinois to Mary Jane (née Clark) and Charles M. Boosinger. She was a three-time divorced cabaret singer who used the professional name Belle Brown. Her first marriage was July 11, 1901 in Montgomery Co, IL to Harry W. Peepo (divorced before 1905), then to a Mr. Overbeck. In 1917, she married William Gaertner, who was 20 years older and a wealthy industrialist, in Crown Point, Indiana. Five months later, William Gaertner successfully sued to have the marriage annulled, claiming that Belva's divorce from Overbeck had not been finalized. They then were married a second time, but had separated by the time Belva was accused of murder.

== Murder of Walter Law ==
On March 11, 1924, Belva Gaertner allegedly shot and killed her lover Walter Law, a married man with one child. Law was found sprawled in the front seat of Gaertner's car with a bottle of gin and a gun lying beside him. Gaertner, found later at her apartment with blood-soaked clothes on the floor, confessed that she was drunk and was driving with Law, but couldn't remember what happened.

Gaertner was arrested for the murder of Law in Chicago on March 12, 1924, and admitted to drinking with Law at various bars and jazz houses, saying she carried a gun for fear of robbers.

== The trial ==
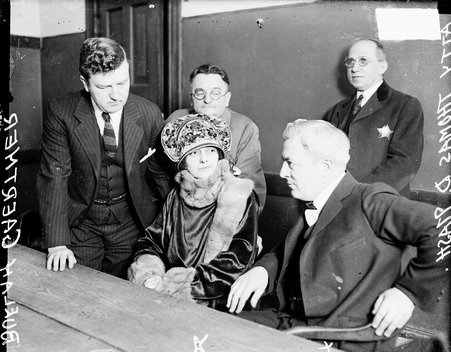
Gaertner with her defense attorney, Thomas D. Nash (right), 1924

One of Law's co-workers testified that Law had confided that Gaertner was a possessive lover who had threatened him with a knife when he tried to leave her, and Law believed she would kill him one day.

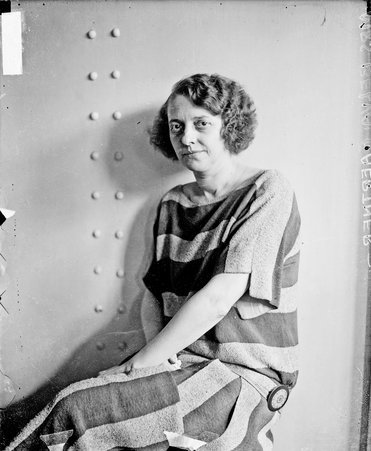
Gaertner circa March 13, 1924, the day after her arrest

Gaertner told Maurine Dallas Watkins: "No woman can love a man enough to kill him. They aren't worth it, because there are always plenty more. Walter was just a kid—29 and I'm 38. Why should I have worried whether he loved me or whether he left me? Gin and guns—either one is bad enough, but together they get you in a dickens of a mess, don't they?" Gaertner was defended by Thomas D. Nash.

Gaertner's defense was that Law might have killed himself with the gun. She was acquitted in June 1924.

== Later life ==
In 1925, following her acquittal, she remarried William Gaertner. In 1926, Gaertner filed for divorce again, claiming she was abusive and an alcoholic. On July 5, Gaertner claimed his wife threatened to murder him after he found her with another man. She was convicted of drunk driving in November 1926.

By 1930, she and Gaertner had reconciled their marriage and moved to Europe. Following William Gaertner's death on December 2, 1948, in Wilmette, Illinois, Belva moved to Pasadena, California and lived with her sister, Ethel Kraushaar. She died of natural causes on May 14, 1965, at the age of 80.

== Stage and screen adaptations ==
Watkins used Belva Gaertner's story as part of the inspiration for her play Chicago; Velma Kelly is a former entertainer who claims she can't remember a thing regarding the murders of her sister and husband. The pair were having an affair. Roxie Hart, the lead character in Chicago, is a chorine who blames her crime on jazz, liquor and guns (Hart's backstory was adapted from an unrelated murder case, that of Beulah Annan). Gaertner attended the 1927 opening of Chicago in Chicago, Illinois.

The play has since been adapted into a 1927 silent film, 1975 stage musical, and 2002 movie musical (which won the Academy Award for Best Picture), all by that name, as well as the 1942 romantic comedy film Roxie Hart. The 1975 musical and its 2002 film adaptation relied on some of Gaertner's story to flesh out the character of Velma Kelly, who in Watkins's original play was a minor character. Her case was also covered on an episode of Deadly Women on Investigation Discovery in 2021.
