= Billy Flynn (Chicago) =

Character from the 1927 play Chicago

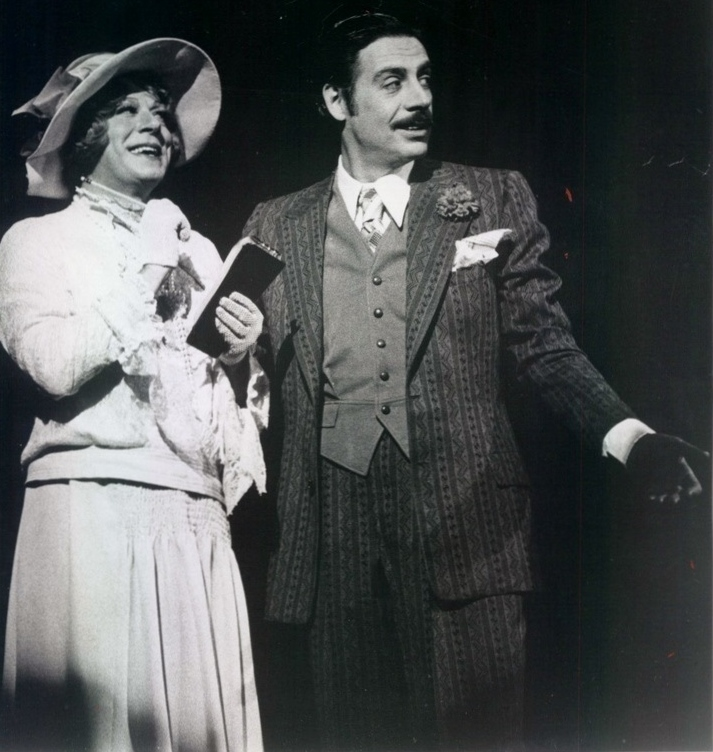
Flynn (at right) as portrayed by Jerry Orbach in the Broadway adaptation, 1976

William Flynn is a fictional character from the 1926 play Chicago, written by Maurine Dallas Watkins, and its various derivative works and remakes.

== Character background ==
Billy Flynn is one of Chicago's most effective criminal defense lawyers; he can win any trial and usually represents women who have murdered their lovers. He has never lost a case involving a female defendant in his whole career, but in turn charges high fees for his services ($5,000, or roughly $91,000 in 2024), demands payment in full up-front, and never takes pro bono work. In rare cases, such as Roxie Hart's, he will take a discount rate in exchange for a cut of proceeds from selling ephemera and media rights fees related to the case. In the play, he defends Hart and her rival Velma Kelly, winning both cases.

Most of Billy Flynn's clients actually did commit the murder they are accused of; therefore he usually attempts to conjure a defense of self-defense or insanity. He will often turn trials into a media circus and public spectacle, regularly manipulates witnesses to fit his narratives (which usually have no resemblance to the truth), and keeps a tabloid sob sister, Mary Sunshine, on retainer to ensure positive press coverage for his clients. He considers his profession to be akin to the entertainment industry, with himself as an A-list star in the field.

In the musical, Flynn sings three songs. "All I Care About (is Love)" serves as Flynn's jingle, in which the crooner claims not to care about wealth or materialism and works for his love of women (later revealed to be a complete lie), "They Both Reached For The Gun (The Press Conference Rag)" serves as a ventriloquist act with a call-and-response between Billy's "dummy" Roxie and the press, and "Razzle Dazzle" (a champagnesque piece with what Jerry Orbach described as "Brechtian subtlety") serves as the explanation of Flynn's modus operandi: make the case a distraction so that the jury loses attention.

== Inspiration ==
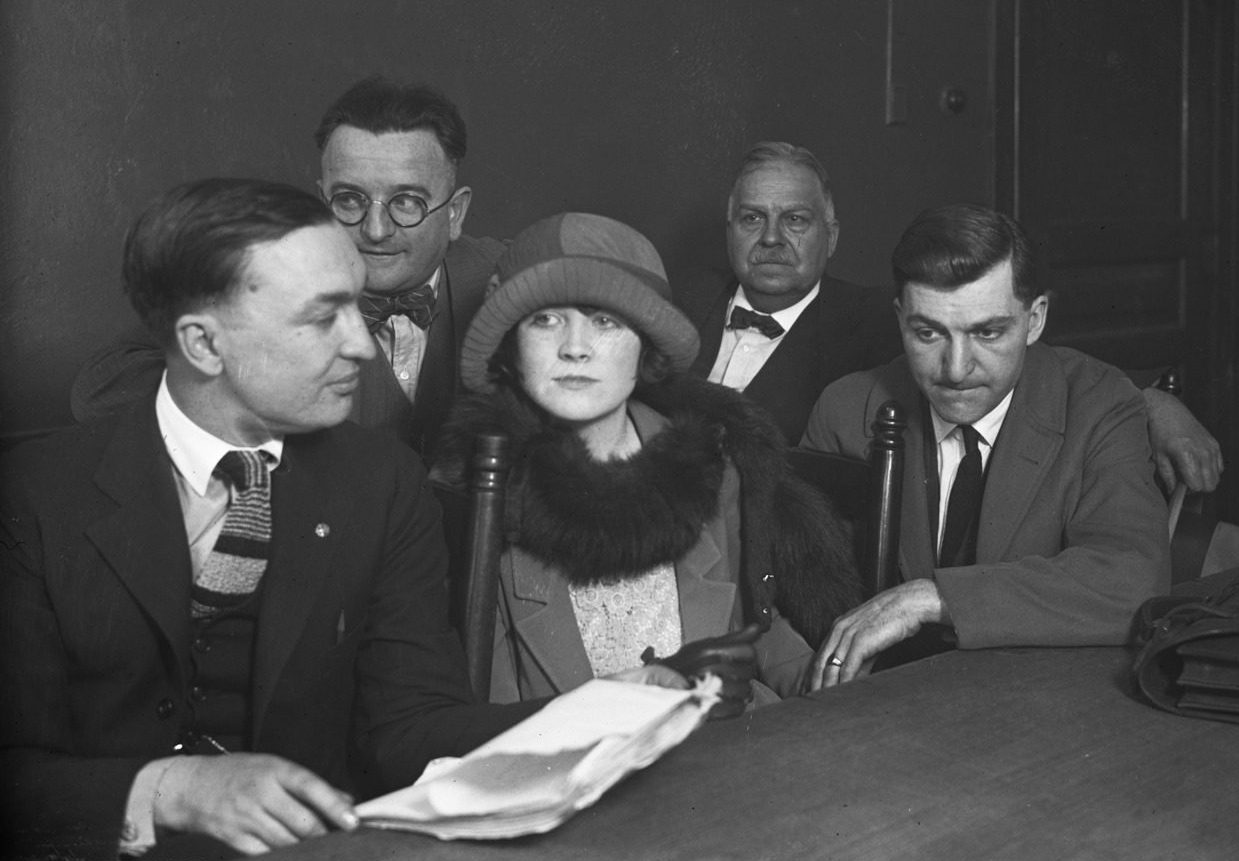
William Scott Stewart, front left, with Beulah Annan and her husband Albert, along with two unknown onlookers. Stewart was one of the inspirations for Flynn; the Annans were the inspiration for Roxie and Amos Hart.

Flynn is a composite character based on real-life Chicago attorneys of the era, William Scott Stewart and W. W. O'Brien. In the musical adaptation, his style is based upon Ted Lewis.

== Portrayals ==
- Edward Ellis in the 1926 Broadway play
- Robert Edeson in the 1927 film
- Adolphe Menjou in the 1942 film Roxie Hart
- Jerry Orbach in the 1975 Broadway musical
- Ben Cross in the original 1979 West End production of the musical
- James Naughton in the original cast of the long running 1996 Broadway revival of the musical
- Richard Gere in the 2002 film
- Michael C. Hall in the 2002 Broadway musical
- Jane Krakowski as Bobbie Flanagan, a parody of the character in the TV series Schmigadoon!
