= Doctors' Wives (1931 film) =

1931 film

- Publicity photo for the film. L to R: Helene Millard, Warner Baxter, Laura Hope Crews and Joan Bennett. Crews may have replaced Cissy Loftus who is credited in the surviving film, or on the contrary Loftus replaced Crews, making this photo an early publicity still before production began.
- Directed by: Frank Borzage
- Written by: Maurine Dallas Watkins; Novel: Henry Lieferant; Sylvia Lieferant
- Produced by: John W. Considine Jr.
- Starring: Warner Baxter; Joan Bennett; Cecilia Loftus; Minna Gombell
- Cinematography: Arthur Edeson
- Edited by: Jack Dennis
- Production company: Fox Film Corporation
- Distributed by: Fox Film Corporation
- Release date: March 15, 1931
- Running time: 80 minutes
- Country: United States
- Language: English

Doctors' Wives is a 1931 American pre-Code romantic drama film made by Fox Film Corporation, directed by Frank Borzage. The film stars Warner Baxter and Joan Bennett. The screenplay was written by Maurine Dallas Watkins, based on a novel by Henry and Sylvia Lieferant.

== Cast ==
- Warner Baxter as Dr. Judson Penning
- Joan Bennett as Nina Wyndram
- Victor Varconi as Dr. Kane Ruyter
- Cecilia Loftus as Aunt Amelia
- Paul Porcasi as Dr. Calucci
- Minna Gombell as Julia Wyndram
- Helene Millard as Vivian Crosby
- John St. Polis as Dr. Mark Wyndram
- George Chandler as Dr. Roberts
- Violet Dunn as Lou Roberts
- Ruth Warren as Charlotte
- Louise Mackintosh as Mrs. Kent
- William Maddox as Rudie
