= Chicago (2002 film) =

Film by Rob Marshall

- Theatrical release poster
- Directed by: Rob Marshall
- Screenplay by: Bill Condon
- Based on: Chicago 1975 musical by Bob Fosse Fred Ebb; Chicago 1926 play by Maurine Dallas Watkins
- Produced by: Martin Richards
- Starring: Renée Zellweger; Catherine Zeta-Jones; Richard Gere; Queen Latifah; John C. Reilly; Lucy Liu; Colm Feore
- Cinematography: Dion Beebe
- Edited by: Martin Walsh
- Music by: John Kander (songs); Danny Elfman (score)
- Production companies: Producer Circle Co.; Zadan/Meron Production; Kalis Productions
- Distributed by: Miramax Films (Worldwide); Alliance Atlantis (Canada); Buena Vista International (Germany)
- Release dates: December 10, 2002 (Los Angeles premiere); December 26, 2002 (Canada); December 27, 2002 (United States); February 27, 2003 (Germany)
- Running time: 113 minutes
- Countries: United States; Canada; Germany
- Language: English
- Budget: $45 million
- Box office: $306.8 million

Chicago is a 2002 musical black comedy crime film based on the 1975 stage musical, which in turn originated in the 1926 play. It explores the themes of celebrity, scandal, and corruption in Chicago during the Jazz Age. The film stars an ensemble cast led by Renée Zellweger, Catherine Zeta-Jones, and Richard Gere, with Queen Latifah, John C. Reilly, Lucy Liu and Colm Feore in supporting roles. The film's plot centers on Roxie Hart (Zellweger) and Velma Kelly (Zeta-Jones), two murderers who find themselves in jail together awaiting trial in 1920s Chicago. Roxie, a housewife, and Velma, a vaudevillian, fight for the fame that will keep them from the gallows. The film marks the feature directorial debut of Rob Marshall, who also choreographed the film, and was adapted by screenwriter Bill Condon, with music by John Kander and lyrics by Fred Ebb.

Chicago premiered in Los Angeles on December 10, 2002 and was released theatrically in Canada and the United States on December 26 and 27 respectively. It was widely acclaimed, with particular praise for the performances of the cast and, grossing over $306.5 million worldwide, emerged as the tenth-highest-grossing film of the year in the United States. Among its many accolades, the film received the most nominations and wins at the 75th Academy Awards, with 13 nominations and six wins, including Best Picture, becoming the first musical to win in the category since Oliver! (1968). The film also earned 12 nominations at the 56th British Academy Film Awards (including Best Film), winning two, as well as three wins at the 8th Critics' Choice Awards (including Best Picture and Best Acting Ensemble) and three each at the 60th Golden Globes (including Best Motion Picture – Musical or Comedy) and 9th Screen Actors Guild Awards (including Outstanding Performance by a Cast in a Motion Picture). Zeta-Jones won Best Supporting Actress at the Academy Awards, BAFTA Awards, Critics' Choice Movie Awards and Screen Actors Guild Awards, while Zellweger won Best Actress at the Screen Actors Guild Awards and Golden Globes, where she beat Zeta-Jones. Latifah and Reilly also received nominations for their performances including at the Academy Awards, while Gere won the Golden Globe Award for Best Actor in a Motion Picture – Musical or Comedy and was also nominated for the Screen Actors Guild Award for Outstanding Performance by a Male Actor in a Leading Role. The film's soundtrack was also widely successful, reaching the top two on the US Billboard 200 and topping the US Billboard Soundtrack Albums chart. It also won Best Compilation Soundtrack for Visual Media at the 46th Annual Grammy Awards.

Considered among the best musical films of all time, it was voted the 12th Best Movie Musical by the American Film Institute in 2006 as part of the publication's 100 Years... series of best film lists, and ranked second in the National Board of Review's annual ranking of the 10 best films of the year in 2002. (Note: The references for the above information can be found in corresponding sections within the article.)

== Plot ==
In 1924, vaudeville star Velma Kelly performs ("Overture/All That Jazz") at The Onyx, a Chicago nightclub; the spotlight highlights the empty place where Velma's sister is missing awkwardly from the double act. Seeking stardom, housewife Roxie Hart watches Velma perform as she awaits furniture salesman Fred Casely, with whom Roxie is having an affair because he promised to introduce her to the nightclub's manager. After the show, Velma is arrested for killing her husband and sister, whom she had caught in bed together. Roxie is disappointed when Casely fails to introduce her to the Onyx manager.

A month later, Casely admits to Roxie that he lied about his connections to sleep with her but is now tired of the affair. Enraged, she shoots him dead. She convinces her gullible husband, Amos, to take the blame, telling him she killed a burglar in self-defense. However, when evidence of Roxie's infidelity is uncovered, Amos recants and tells the police that Casely was dead when he arrived home ("Funny Honey"). Roxie is arrested, with District Attorney Martin Harrison declaring she faces execution by hanging.

At the Cook County Jail, Roxie is sent to Murderess' Row, supervised by the corrupt Matron "Mama" Morton ("When You're Good to Mama"). Roxie learns the backstories of the other women there, including her idol, Velma ("Cell Block Tango"), who rebuffs her attempts at friendship. On Morton's advice, Roxie engages Velma's lawyer, the brilliant Billy Flynn ("All I Care About"). Flynn and Roxie manipulate the press, reinventing Roxie as a virtuous Southern woman corrupted by the city's decadent nightlife. A "repentant" Roxie claims she had the affair with Casely because Amos neglected her for work, but Casely jealously attacked her when she chose to remain with Amos ("We Both Reached for the Gun"). The press extolls the story, and Roxie becomes an overnight sensation ("Roxie"), praised by the public as a tragic heroine. Unhappy at losing the public's attention, Velma tries to convince Roxie to join her act, replacing her murdered sister ("I Can't Do It Alone"); now the more popular of the two rivals, Roxie snubs her.

When wealthy heiress Kitty Baxter is arrested for murdering her husband and his two mistresses, the press and Flynn instantly shift their focus to her. To Velma's exasperation, Roxie quickly regains the spotlight by claiming pregnancy. The press ignores Amos ("Mister Cellophane"); to generate more sympathy for Roxie, Flynn convinces Amos that the child is Casely's and that he should divorce Roxie in her predicament. Roxie decides to fire Flynn, believing she can now win on her own. However, when Katalin Helinszki, a Hungarian woman on Murderess' Row (the only inmate who insists on her own innocence), becomes the first woman in Cook County history to be executed by hanging, Roxie realizes the gravity of the situation and rehires Flynn.

Flynn turns Roxie's trial into a media spectacle ("Razzle Dazzle") with the help of sensationalist newspaper reporters and radio personality Mary Sunshine. Flynn discredits witnesses, manipulates evidence, and even stages a public reconciliation between Amos and Roxie when she claims the child is his. Mama and Velma find Roxie's diary, containing incriminating entries, and offer it to the prosecution as evidence in exchange for amnesty in Velma's own case. Flynn discredits the diary, implying from its legalistic language that it was written by DA Harrison, who planted it as evidence ("A Tap Dance"). Though Roxie is acquitted, her fame is eclipsed moments later when another woman-who-shot-her-husband shoots her own lawyer outside the courthouse. Flynn admits to Roxie that he tampered with her diary himself to incriminate the DA and to free his two clients simultaneously. Loyal Amos is excited to be a father, but Roxie cruelly reveals that she faked her pregnancy.

Roxie pursues a vaudeville career with limited success ("Nowadays"). The similarly unsuccessful Velma reapproaches Roxie to suggest performing together as a novel double act featuring two murderesses. Though initially refusing, Roxie accepts when Velma points out that they can perform together despite their mutual dislike. The two stage a spectacular performance ("Nowadays/Hot Honey Rag"), receiving a standing ovation from an enthusiastic audience that includes Flynn, Morton, the jurors, and other acquitted murderesses.

== Cast ==
- Renée Zellweger as Roxie Hart, a housewife who aspires to be a vaudevillian, and is arrested for the murder of her deceitful paramour Fred Casely. Charlize Theron, Marisa Tomei, Christina Applegate, Mira Sorvino, Jennifer Jason Leigh, Milla Jovovich, and Jennifer Aniston were considered for the role.
- Catherine Zeta-Jones as Velma Kelly, a charismatic vaudevillian who is arrested for the murders of her husband Charlie and sister Veronica after catching them in bed together
- Richard Gere as Billy Flynn, a duplicitous, greedy, smooth-talking lawyer who turns his clients into celebrities to gain public support for them. Michael Jackson was considered for the role, but Harvey Weinstein heavily objected to the idea of casting Jackson as he felt more attention would be paid to him than the rest of the cast. John Travolta was offered the role but turned it down.
- Queen Latifah as Matron "Mama" Morton, the corrupt but nurturing matron of the Cook County Jail
- John C. Reilly as Amos Hart, Roxie's naïve, simple-minded but devoted husband
- Lucy Liu as Kitty Baxter, a millionaire heiress who briefly outshines Roxie and Velma when she kills her husband and his two mistresses
- Taye Diggs as the bandleader, a shadowy, mystical master of ceremonies who introduces each song
- Colm Feore as Martin Harrison, the prosecutor in both Roxie and Velma's court cases
- Christine Baranski as Mary Sunshine, a sensationalist reporter
- Dominic West as Fred Casely, Roxie's deceitful paramour and murder victim
- Mýa Harrison as Mona, a prisoner on Murderess' Row who killed her artist boyfriend Al Lipschitz via strangulation after discovering he had multiple affairs
- Deidre Goodwin as June, a prisoner on Murderess' Row who killed her husband Wilbur by stabbing him ten times with her kitchen knife after he angrily accused her out of jealousy of having an affair with the milkman
- Denise Faye as Annie, a prisoner on Murderess' Row who killed her boyfriend Ezekiel Young by poisoning his drink with arsenic after discovering he was a Mormon with six different wives
- Ekaterina Shchelkanova as Katalin "Hunyak" Helinszki, a Hungarian prisoner on Murderess' Row who insists in Hungarian that she is innocent and does not speak English except for two words: "not guilty"; regardless, she is hanged
- Susan Misner as Liz, a prisoner on Murderess' Row who killed her husband Bernie by shooting him twice in the head after he would not stop popping his gum
- Jayne Eastwood as Mrs. Borusewicz, the Harts' neighbor from across the hall
- Chita Rivera as Nickie, a prostitute. Rivera originated the role of Velma in the Broadway musical Chicago in 1975; her appearance in the film is a cameo.

== Production ==
=== Development ===
The film is based on the 1975 Broadway musical of the same name, which ran for 936 performances. A film adaptation of Chicago was to have been the next project for Bob Fosse, who had directed and choreographed the original 1975 Broadway production and had won an Oscar for his direction of the film version of Cabaret (1972). Although he died before realizing his version, Fosse's distinctive jazz choreography style is evident throughout the 2002 film, and the credits include a brief dedication to Fosse, his wife Gwen Verdon, and Broadway producer Robert Fryer. The minimalist 1996 revival of the musical proved far more successful, having played more than 10,601 performances (as of December 3, 2023), holding records for longest-running musical revival, longest-running American musical on Broadway and second longest-running show in Broadway history. Its runaway success sparked a greater appreciation of the 1975 original production and renewed stalled interest in a long-anticipated film, which incorporates the influences of both productions.

The original production's musical numbers were staged as vaudeville acts; the film respects this but presents them as cutaway scenes in the mind of the Roxie character, while scenes in "real life" are filmed with a hard-edged grittiness. The musical itself was based on a 1926 Broadway play by Maurine Dallas Watkins, a journalist who had found her inspiration in two real-life Chicago trials she had covered for the press, about two real-life Jazz-era murderers Beulah Annan (Roxie Hart) and Belva Gaertner (Velma Kelly). The George Abbott-directed production, starring Francine Larrimore and Juliette Crosby, ran for 172 performances at the Music Box Theatre, and within a year was adapted to a silent film, in which Gaertner herself had a cameo. Chicago was produced by American companies Miramax Films and The Producers Circle in association with the German company Kallis Productions. Roxie Hart, also known as Chicago or Chicago Gal, is a 1942 American comedy film directed by William A. Wellman and starring Ginger Rogers, Adolphe Menjou and George Montgomery. The film is an adaptation of the 1926 play.

=== Filming ===
Principal photography took place in Toronto, Ontario, Canada, and ran from December 2001 to April 2002. The courthouse scene was shot in Osgoode Hall. Other scenes were shot at Queen's Park, the former Gooderham and Worts Distillery, Casa Loma, the Elgin Theatre, Union Station, the Canada Life Building, the Danforth Music Hall, and the Old City Hall.

== Music ==
Several songs from the musical's original score were cut from the film, primarily due to the musical numbers being figments of Roxie's imagination. "Tap Dance", "A Little Bit of Good", "I Can't Do It Alone" (reprise), "My Own Best Friend", "I Know a Girl", "Me and My Baby" and "When Velma Takes the Stand" were removed, and "Class", while filmed and recorded for the soundtrack album, is a deleted scene on the DVD, as well as part of an "extended version" from the film's 2005 broadcast premiere on NBC. An instrumental of "Me and My Baby" can be heard in its spot, where Roxie enjoys the renewed fame after claiming she's pregnant.

1. "Overture / All That Jazz" – Velma, Company
2. "Funny Honey" – Roxie and Amos
3. "When You're Good to Mama" – Mama
4. "Cell Block Tango" – Velma, Cell Block Girls
5. "All I Care About" – Billy, Chorus Girls
6. "We Both Reached for the Gun" – Billy, Roxie, Mary, Reporters
7. "Roxie" – Roxie, Chorus Boys
8. "I Can't Do It Alone" – Velma
9. "Chicago After Midnight" (score)
10. "Mister Cellophane" – Amos
11. "Razzle Dazzle" – Billy, Company
12. "Class" (deleted scene) – Velma and Mama
13. "A Tap Dance" – Billy
14. "Nowadays" – Roxie
15. "Nowadays / Hot Honey Rag" – Roxie, Velma
16. "I Move On" (end credits) – Roxie, Velma
17. "All That Jazz (reprise)" (end credits) – Velma, Company

== Release ==
Chicago held its world premiere in Los Angeles on December 10, 2002. In North America, the film opened in limited release at 77 theaters on December 27, 2002. It expanded through the following weeks before reaching a peak of 2,701 theaters by the weekend of March 28, 2003, the first weekend after the Academy Awards.

=== Home media ===
Chicago was released by Buena Vista Home Entertainment (under the Miramax Home Entertainment banner) on DVD in Region 1 (USA, Canada, and US territories) on August 19, 2003. It was released in Full Screen and Widescreen. In addition to this release, a two-disc "Razzle Dazzle" Edition was released over two years later on December 20, 2005, and later, on Blu-ray format, in January 2007 and, in an updated release, in May 2011. The release provides a feature-length audio commentary track with director Marshall and screenwriter Condon. There is also a deleted musical number called "Class", performed by Zeta-Jones and Queen Latifah.

== Reception ==
=== Box office ===
Chicago grossed $170.7 million in the United States and Canada, as well as $136.1 million in other territories. Combined, the film grossed $306.8 million worldwide, which was, at the time, the highest gross of any film never to reach #1 or #2 in the weekly box office charts in the North American markets (Canada and United States—where it peaked at #3). Worldwide, Chicago was the highest grossing live action musical with $306 million, a record that was then broken by Mamma Mia!.

=== Critical response ===
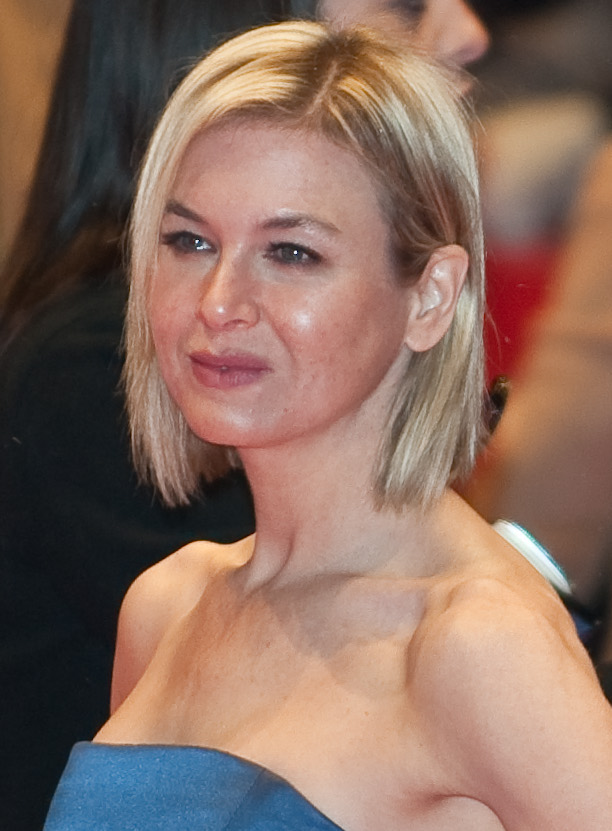
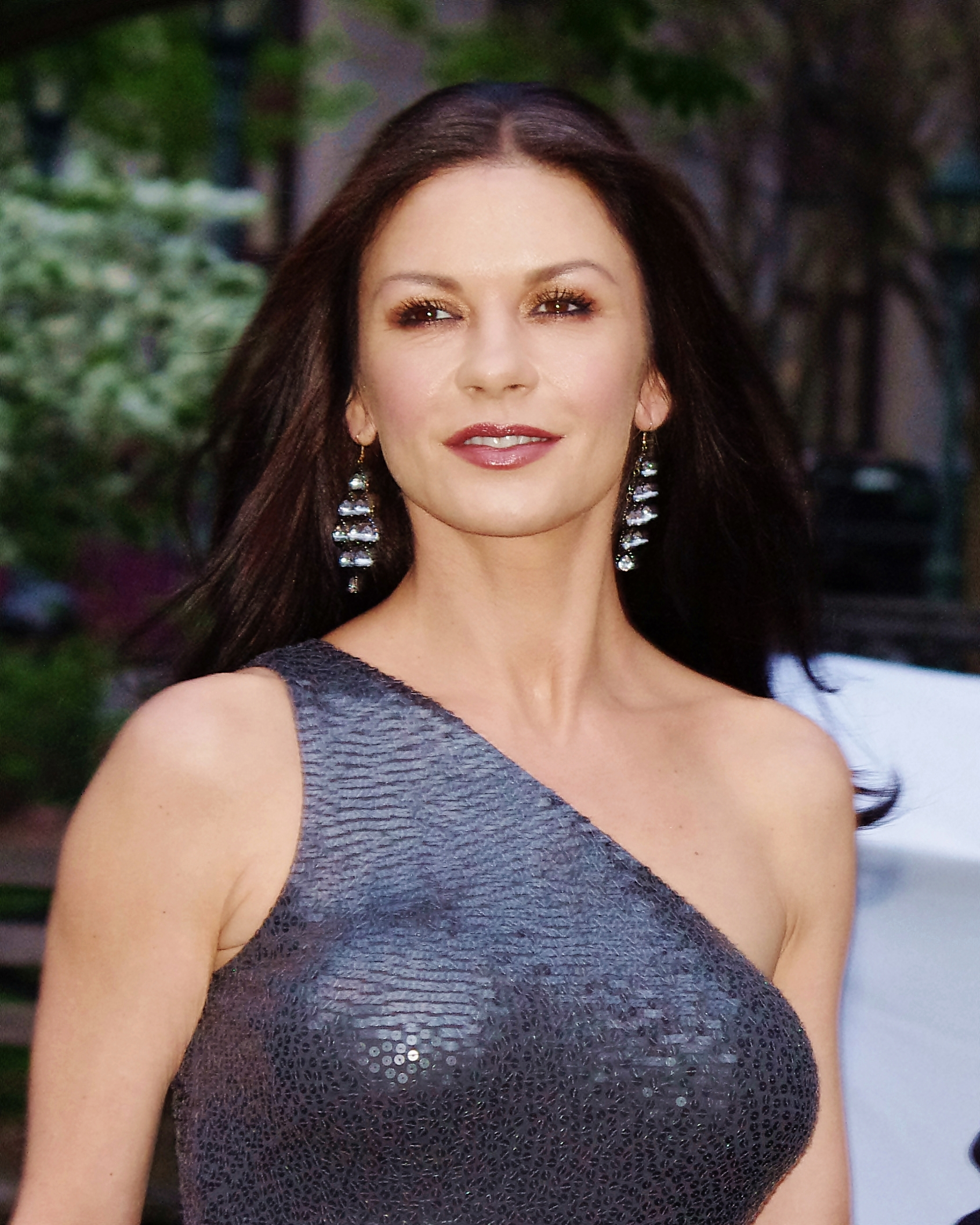
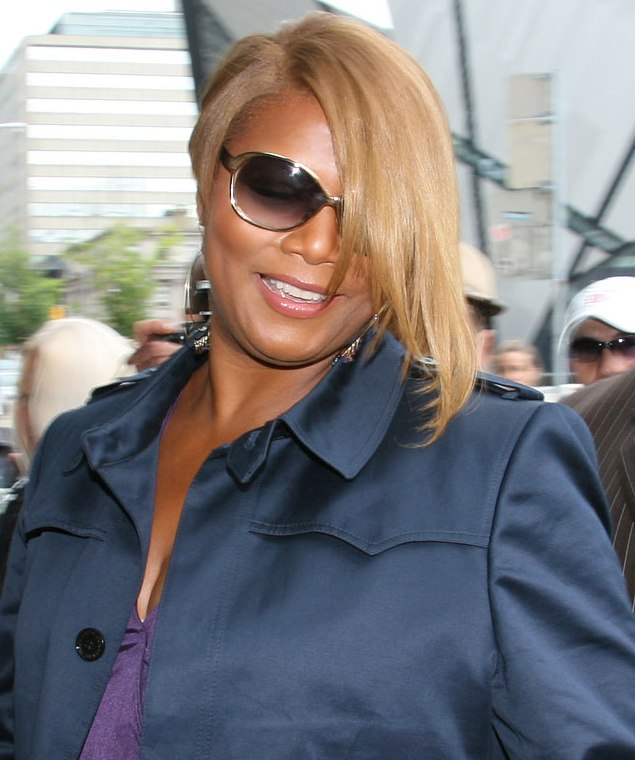
The performances of Renée Zellweger, Catherine Zeta-Jones and Queen Latifah garnered widespread critical acclaim, earning them all Academy Award nominations, with the first being nominated for Best Actress and the latter two being nominated for Best Supporting Actress, with Zeta-Jones winning in her category.

On the review aggregator website Rotten Tomatoes, 87% of 260 critics' reviews are positive. The website's consensus reads: "A rousing and energetic adaptation of the Broadway musical, Chicago succeeds on the level of pure spectacle, but provides a surprising level of depth and humor as well." Metacritic, which uses a weighted average, assigned the film a score of 81 out of 100, based on 39 critics, indicating "universal acclaim". Audiences polled by CinemaScore gave the film an average grade of "A−" on an A+ to F scale.

The cast received widespread acclaim for their performances. Tim Robey, reviewer for The Daily Telegraph, labeled Chicago "the best screen musical for 30 years". He also stated that it has taken a "three-step tango for us to welcome back the movie musical as a form". Robey also wrote "this particular Chicago makes the most prolific use it possibly can out of one specific advantage the cinema has over the stage when it comes to song and dance: it's a sustained celebration of parallel montage". Roger Ebert gave the film three-and-a-half stars out of four, calling it "big, brassy fun". However, other reviews claimed that there were issues with the film being too streamlined, and minor complaints were made about Marshall's directing influences.

=== Accolades ===
Award	Category	Nominee(s)	Result	Ref.
Academy Awards	Best Picture	Martin Richards	Won	
Academy Awards	Best Director	Rob Marshall	Nominated	
Academy Awards	Best Actress	Renée Zellweger	Nominated	
Academy Awards	Best Supporting Actor	John C. Reilly	Nominated	
Academy Awards	Best Supporting Actress	Queen Latifah	Nominated	
Academy Awards	Best Supporting Actress	Catherine Zeta-Jones	Won	
Academy Awards	Best Adapted Screenplay	Bill Condon	Nominated	
Academy Awards	Best Art Direction	Art Direction: John Myhre; Set Decoration: Gordon Sim	Won	
Academy Awards	Best Cinematography	Dion Beebe	Nominated	
Academy Awards	Best Costume Design	Colleen Atwood	Won	
Academy Awards	Best Film Editing	Martin Walsh	Won	
Academy Awards	Best Original Song	"I Move On"; Music by John Kander; Lyrics by Fred Ebb	Nominated	
Academy Awards	Best Sound	Michael Minkler, Dominick Tavella, and David Lee	Won	
AARP Movies for Grownups Awards	Best Breakaway Performance	Richard Gere	Won	
Amanda Awards	Best Foreign Feature Film	Rob Marshall	Nominated	
American Choreography Awards	Outstanding Achievement in Feature Film	Rob Marshall, John DeLuca, Cynthia Onrubia, Joey Pizzi, and Denise Faye	Won	
American Cinema Editors Awards	Best Edited Feature Film – Comedy or Musical	Martin Walsh	Won	
American Film Institute Awards	Top 10 Films		Won	
Art Directors Guild Awards	Excellence in Production Design for a Period or Fantasy Film	John Myhre	Nominated	
BET Awards	Best Actress	Queen Latifah (Note: Also for Bringing Down the House and Brown Sugar.)	Won	
Black Reel Awards	Outstanding Supporting Actress	Queen Latifah	Won	
BMI Film & TV Awards	Film Music Award	Danny Elfman	Won	
Boston Society of Film Critics Awards	Best Supporting Actor	John C. Reilly (Note: Also for Gangs of New York, The Good Girl, and The Hours.)	Runner-up	
Boston Society of Film Critics Awards	Best Supporting Actress	Catherine Zeta-Jones	Runner-up	
British Academy Film Awards	Best Film	Martin Richards	Nominated	
British Academy Film Awards	Best Direction	Rob Marshall	Nominated	
British Academy Film Awards	Best Actress in a Leading Role	Renée Zellweger	Nominated	
British Academy Film Awards	Best Actress in a Supporting Role	Queen Latifah	Nominated	
British Academy Film Awards	Best Actress in a Supporting Role	Catherine Zeta-Jones	Won	
British Academy Film Awards	Best Cinematography	Dion Beebe	Nominated	
British Academy Film Awards	Best Costume Design	Colleen Atwood	Nominated	
British Academy Film Awards	Best Editing	Martin Walsh	Nominated	
British Academy Film Awards	Best Make-Up and Hair	Judi Cooper-Sealy	Nominated	
British Academy Film Awards	Best Original Film Music	Danny Elfman	Nominated	
British Academy Film Awards	Best Production Design	John Myhre	Nominated	
British Academy Film Awards	Best Sound	Michael Minkler, David Lee, and Dominick Tavella	Won	
British Society of Cinematographers Awards	Best Cinematography in a Theatrical Feature Film	Dion Beebe	Nominated	
Canadian Network of Makeup Artists Awards	Best Make-Up Artist for a Feature Film	Jordan Samuel	Won	
Canadian Network of Makeup Artists Awards	Best Hairstyling for a Feature Film	Judi Cooper-Sealy	Won	
Central Ohio Film Critics Association Awards	Best Supporting Actor	John C. Reilly	Runner-up	
Chicago Film Critics Association Awards	Best Actress	Renée Zellweger	Nominated	
Cinema Audio Society Awards	Outstanding Achievement in Sound Mixing for Motion Pictures	Michael Minkler, Dominick Tavella, and David Lee	Nominated	
Costume Designers Guild Awards	Excellence in Period/Fantasy Film	Colleen Atwood	Won	
Critics' Choice Awards	Best Picture		Won	
Critics' Choice Awards	Best Supporting Actress	Catherine Zeta-Jones	Won	
Critics' Choice Awards	Best Cast		Won	
Dallas-Fort Worth Film Critics Association Awards	Best Film		Won	
Dallas-Fort Worth Film Critics Association Awards	Top 10 Films		Won	
David di Donatello Awards	Best Foreign Film	Rob Marshall	Nominated	
Directors Guild of America Awards	Outstanding Directorial Achievement in Motion Pictures	Rob Marshall	Won	
Edgar Allan Poe Awards	Best Motion Picture	Bill Condon	Won	
Evening Standard British Film Awards	Best Actress	Catherine Zeta-Jones	Won	
Florida Film Critics Circle Awards	Best Song	"Cell Block Tango"	Won	
Gold Derby Film Awards	Best Motion Picture	Martin Richards	Won	
Gold Derby Film Awards	Best Director	Rob Marshall	Nominated	
Gold Derby Film Awards	Best Actress	Renée Zellweger	Nominated	
Gold Derby Film Awards	Best Supporting Actor	John C. Reilly	Nominated	
Gold Derby Film Awards	Best Supporting Actress	Catherine Zeta-Jones	Nominated	
Gold Derby Film Awards	Best Adapted Screenplay	Bill Condon	Nominated	
Gold Derby Film Awards	Best Art Direction	John Myhre and Andrew M. Stearn	Won	
Gold Derby Film Awards	Best Cinematography	Dion Beebe	Nominated	
Gold Derby Film Awards	Best Costume Design	Colleen Atwood	Nominated	
Gold Derby Film Awards	Best Film Editing	Martin Walsh	Won	
Gold Derby Film Awards	Best Original Song	"I Move On" – John Kander and Fred Ebb	Nominated	
Gold Derby Film Awards	Best Ensemble Cast		Nominated	
Gold Derby Film Awards	Best Motion Picture of the Decade		Nominated	
Gold Derby Film Awards	Best Supporting Actress of the Decade	Catherine Zeta-Jones	Nominated	
Golden Globe Awards	Best Motion Picture – Musical or Comedy		Won	
Golden Globe Awards	Best Actor in a Motion Picture – Musical or Comedy	Richard Gere	Won	
Golden Globe Awards	Best Actress in a Motion Picture – Musical or Comedy	Renée Zellweger	Won	
Golden Globe Awards	Best Actress in a Motion Picture – Musical or Comedy	Catherine Zeta-Jones	Nominated	
Golden Globe Awards	Best Supporting Actor – Motion Picture	John C. Reilly	Nominated	
Golden Globe Awards	Best Supporting Actress – Motion Picture	Queen Latifah	Nominated	
Golden Globe Awards	Best Director – Motion Picture	Rob Marshall	Nominated	
Golden Globe Awards	Best Screenplay – Motion Picture	Bill Condon	Nominated	
Golden Reel Awards	Best Sound Editing in a Musical Feature Film – Music	Annette Kudrak, E. Gedney Webb, Ellen Segal, Kenton Jakub, and Missy Cohen	Won	
Golden Reel Awards	Best Sound Editing in Domestic Features – Dialogue & ADR	Maurice Schell, Gina Alfano, Laura Civiello, Hal Levinsohn, and Louis Bertini	Nominated	
Golden Schmoes Awards	Best Actress of the Year	Renée Zellweger	Nominated	
Golden Schmoes Awards	Best Supporting Actress of the Year	Catherine Zeta-Jones	Won	
Golden Schmoes Awards	Best Music in a Movie	Chicago: Music from the Miramax Motion Picture	Nominated	
Golden Trailer Awards	Best Music	Chicago: Music from the Miramax Motion Picture	Nominated	
Grammy Awards	Best Compilation Soundtrack Album for a Motion Picture, Television or Other Visual Media	Chicago: Music from the Miramax Motion Picture; Randy Spendlove, Ric Wake, and Dan Hetzel	Won	
Grammy Awards	Best Song Written for a Motion Picture, Television or Other Visual Media	"I Move On" – John Kander and Fred Ebb	Nominated	
Japan Academy Film Prize	Outstanding Foreign Language Film		Nominated	
Key Art Awards	Student Competition: Trailer	Chicago – Sarah Broshar (for "Road to Stardom")	Nominated	
Las Vegas Film Critics Society Awards	Best Actress	Renée Zellweger	Nominated	
Las Vegas Film Critics Society Awards	Best Supporting Actor	John C. Reilly (Note: Also for Gangs of New York and The Hours.)	Won	
Makeup Artist and Hair Stylist Guild Awards	Best Period Makeup – Feature	Jordan Samuel, Patricia Keighran, and Edelgard K. Pfluegl	Won	
MTV Movie Awards	Best Female Performance	Queen Latifah	Nominated	
National Board of Review Awards	Top 10 Films		2nd Place	
National Board of Review Awards	Best Directorial Debut	Rob Marshall	Won	
New York Film Critics Circle Awards	Best First Film	Rob Marshall	Runner-up	
New York Film Critics Online Awards	Best Film		Won	
Online Film & Television Association Awards	Best Motion Picture	Martin Richards and Harvey Weinstein	Won (Note: Tied with The Lord of the Rings: The Two Towers.)	
Online Film & Television Association Awards	Best Director	Rob Marshall	Nominated	
Online Film & Television Association Awards	Best Actress	Renée Zellweger	Nominated	
Online Film & Television Association Awards	Best Supporting Actress	Catherine Zeta-Jones	Nominated	
Online Film & Television Association Awards	Best Adapted Screenplay	Bill Condon	Nominated	
Online Film & Television Association Awards	Best Cinematography	Dion Beebe	Nominated	
Online Film & Television Association Awards	Best Costume Design	Colleen Atwood	Nominated	
Online Film & Television Association Awards	Best Film Editing	Martin Walsh	Nominated	
Online Film & Television Association Awards	Best Original Song	"I Move On"	Nominated	
Online Film & Television Association Awards	Best Adapted Song	"All That Jazz"	Nominated	
Online Film & Television Association Awards	Best Adapted Song	"Cell Block Tango"	Won	
Online Film & Television Association Awards	Best Adapted Song	"Mr. Cellophane"	Nominated	
Online Film & Television Association Awards	Best Adapted Song	"We Both Reached for the Gun"	Nominated	
Online Film & Television Association Awards	Best Adapted Song	"When You're Good to Mama	Nominated	
Online Film & Television Association Awards	Best Production Design	John Myhre and Gordon Sim	Nominated	
Online Film & Television Association Awards	Best First Feature	Rob Marshall	Won	
Online Film & Television Association Awards	Best Casting	Ali Farrell and Laura Rosenthal	Nominated	
Online Film & Television Association Awards	Best Cinematic Moment	"Cell Block Tango"	Nominated	
Online Film & Television Association Awards	Best Ensemble		Won	
Online Film & Television Association Awards	Best Makeup		Nominated	
Online Film & Television Association Awards	Best Sound		Nominated	
Online Film Critics Society Awards	Best Supporting Actress	Catherine Zeta-Jones	Nominated	
Online Film Critics Society Awards	Best Costume Design	Colleen Atwood	Nominated	
Online Film Critics Society Awards	Best Editing	Martin Walsh	Nominated	
Online Film Critics Society Awards	Best Breakthrough Filmmaker	Rob Marshall	Nominated	
Online Film Critics Society Awards	Best Ensemble		Nominated	
Phoenix Film Critics Society Awards	Best Picture		Nominated	
Phoenix Film Critics Society Awards	Best Director	Rob Marshall	Nominated	
Phoenix Film Critics Society Awards	Best Actress	Renée Zellweger	Nominated	
Phoenix Film Critics Society Awards	Best Supporting Actress	Catherine Zeta-Jones	Won	
Phoenix Film Critics Society Awards	Best Cinematography	Dion Beebe	Nominated	
Phoenix Film Critics Society Awards	Best Costume Design	Colleen Atwood	Won	
Phoenix Film Critics Society Awards	Best Film Editing	Martin Walsh	Won	
Phoenix Film Critics Society Awards	Best Newcomer	Rob Marshall	Nominated	
Phoenix Film Critics Society Awards	Best Acting Ensemble		Nominated	
Producers Guild of America Awards	Outstanding Producer of Theatrical Motion Pictures	Martin Richards	Won	
Russian Guild of Film Critics Awards	Best Foreign Actor	Richard Gere	Nominated	
Russian Guild of Film Critics Awards	Best Foreign Actress	Renée Zellweger	Nominated	
Satellite Awards	Best Actress in a Motion Picture – Musical or Comedy	Renée Zellweger	Nominated	
Satellite Awards	Best Screenplay – Adapted	Bill Condon	Nominated	
Satellite Awards	Best Original Song	"Love Is a Crime"	Nominated	
Screen Actors Guild Awards	Outstanding Performance by a Cast in a Motion Picture	Christine Baranski, Taye Diggs, Colm Feore, Richard Gere, Mýa, Lucy Liu, Queen Latifah, John C. Reilly, Renée Zellweger, and Catherine Zeta-Jones	Won	
Screen Actors Guild Awards	Outstanding Performance by a Male Actor in a Leading Role	Richard Gere	Nominated	
Screen Actors Guild Awards	Outstanding Performance by a Female Actor in a Leading Role	Renée Zellweger	Won	
Screen Actors Guild Awards	Outstanding Performance by a Female Actor in a Supporting Role	Queen Latifah	Nominated	
Screen Actors Guild Awards	Outstanding Performance by a Female Actor in a Supporting Role	Catherine Zeta-Jones	Won	
Southeastern Film Critics Association Awards	Best Picture		3rd Place	
Teen Choice Awards	Choice Movie Actress – Drama/Action Adventure	Queen Latifah	Nominated	
Teen Choice Awards	Choice Movie Hissy Fit	Lucy Liu	Nominated	
Teen Choice Awards	Choice Movie Liar	Renée Zellweger	Nominated	
Teen Choice Awards	Choice Movie Villain	Richard Gere	Nominated	
Teen Choice Awards	Choice Breakout Movie Star – Female	Queen Latifah (Note: Also for Bringing Down the House.)	Nominated	
Utah Film Critics Association Awards	Best Supporting Actress	Catherine Zeta-Jones	Runner-up	
Washington D.C. Area Film Critics Association Awards	Best Director	Rob Marshall	Runner-up	
Writers Guild of America Awards	Best Adapted Screenplay	Bill Condon	Nominated	

== Legacy ==
With Moulin Rouge! (2001) and 8 Mile (2002), Chicago is often credited with ushering a re-emergence of the musical film genre in the 21st century.

Japanese rock band Buck-Tick named their 2010 album Razzle Dazzle after the film's song of the same name.

In February 2025, The Washington Post ranked Chicago at number 2 on its list of "The 25 best movie musicals of the 21st century," with Naveen Kumar describing it as "a perfect marriage of theatrical flair to the power of moviemaking."

In July 2025, it was one of the films voted for the "Readers' Choice" edition of The New York Times' list of "The 100 Best Movies of the 21st Century," finishing at number 134.
