= Maurine Dallas Watkins =

American playwright and screenwriter

- Born: July 27, 1896 (Note: Remaining records agree on the date but not the precise year.); Louisville, Kentucky, U.S. (or possibly Lexington, KY)
- Died: August 10, 1969 (aged 73); Jacksonville, Florida, U.S.
- Education: Butler College; Radcliffe College; Yale Drama School
- Occupations: Playwright; screenwriter; journalist

Maurine Dallas Watkins (July 27, 1896 – August 10, 1969) was an American playwright and screenwriter. Early in her career, she briefly worked as a journalist covering the courthouse beat for the Chicago Tribune. This experience gave her the material for her most famous piece of work, the stage play Chicago (1926), which was eventually adapted into the 1975 Broadway musical of the same name, which was then made into a film in 2002 that won six Academy Awards, including Best Picture.

Watkins was born in Kentucky and grew up in Indiana. She graduated with honors from Butler University and headed to Radcliffe, where she received training as a dramatist. She left Radcliffe and was in advertising in Chicago in the early 1920s. She then landed a job as a reporter before returning to university at what became Yale Drama School and play-writing success. Watkins went on to write screenplays in Hollywood, eventually retiring to Florida.

== Early life and career ==
Watkins was born in Louisville, Kentucky, or possibly Lexington, Kentucky. She was born on July 27, however, her birth certificate does not exist in Kentucky state records and several different years have been suggested. Watkins' father was a minister and she an only child. Her family moved to Crawfordsville, Indiana and at age 11 she received local notice for putting on a play she wrote, "Hearts of Gold", which made $45 for charity (about $1600 in 2025 dollars). At Crawfordsville High School she started a newspaper and was active in clubs. She attended a total of five colleges (including Hamilton College (Kentucky), Transylvania University, Butler College (Indianapolis), and Radcliffe College). While at Butler, Watkins joined the Gamma chapter of Kappa Alpha Theta Women's Fraternity and was initiated in 1919.

That year, she graduated first in her class from Butler, and then moved on to Radcliffe, Massachusetts to pursue graduate studies in Greek. However, her plans changed after she applied for and was accepted into English Professor George Pierce Baker's playwriting workshop at Harvard University. Baker encouraged writing students to seek experience in the larger world and may have recommended newspaper reporting. Watkins left Radcliffe before completing a degree, moved to Chicago and first worked in advertising for Standard Oil. While working in advertising, she entertained ideas of working as a playwright. In early 1924, she instead landed a job as a reporter with the Chicago Tribune.

For the Tribune, where Watkins worked for eight months, she covered the murders and the subsequent trials of Belva Gaertner, a twice-divorced cabaret singer, and Beulah Sheriff Annan. Watkins focused on the farcical, cynical, and sensational aspects of the two cases, the press and public interest, and the legal proceedings. She highlighted two attractive "jazz babies" claiming to have been corrupted by men and liquor. She characterized Annan as "beauty of the cell block" and Gaertner as "most stylish of Murderess Row." She competed with other female journalists, such as Ione Quinby, for exclusive scoops on sensational crime stories. Gartner and Annan, after months of press coverage in Chicago's seven daily papers, were found not guilty in separate trials; Watkins believed they were guilty.

Watkins published about 50 stories during her time at the paper, in addition to crime and courts, she was sent to cover funerals, wrote on women's style, and she profiled leaders of the women's pacifist movement. Watkins also briefly reported on the noted Leopold and Loeb kidnapping and murder case, whose sensational qualities quickly overshadowed the coverage of the Belva Gaertner verdict.

Soon after, she returned to school to study again under Baker, who had moved to Yale University, to help start the Yale School of Drama. As a class assignment in his famous 47 Workshop course, she wrote a thinly fictionalized account of the two murders. She first called it The Brave Little Woman, then Chicago, or Play Ball (first copyrighted version: pre-production manuscript), and finally Chicago (second copyrighted version: post-production script). Beulah Annan became "Roxie Hart"; Belva Gaertner, "Velma"; Albert Annan, "Amos Hart"; and the two lawyers, William Scott Stewart and W.W. O'Brien, were combined into the composite character "Billy Flynn". Watkins' rival reporters, who were far more sympathetic to the women's causes, were parodied as "Mary Sunshine," the easily manipulated reporter who later turns into Velma and Roxie's vaudeville manager.

Director Sam Forrest was replaced by George Abbott at the request of Jeanne Eagels (Roxie Hart); but Eagels quit the show within a few days, and Francine Larrimore replaced her. Chicago opened on Broadway on 30 December 1926 (though the run is listed as 1927). The play ran for a respectable 172 performances, then toured for two years (with a then-unknown Clark Gable appearing as Amos Hart in a Los Angeles production ). A silent film version in 1927 was produced and supervised by Cecil B. DeMille and starred former Mack Sennett "bathing beauty" Phyllis Haver as Roxie Hart. It was adapted as Roxie Hart in 1942 with Ginger Rogers in the title role. This 1942 film version eliminated all the murderesses except the unnamed Velma Kelly, and the stage and screen musical versions eliminated Jake, Babe, and several other characters.

Watkins wrote about 20 plays, but Chicago was her most successful. She moved to Hollywood to write screenplays, including the 1936 comedy Libeled Lady. The film featured William Powell, Myrna Loy, Jean Harlow, and Spencer Tracy. Her play and screenwriting, coupled with investments, made her a millionaire, and she traveled the world.

== Later life ==
Her public career ended around the time her father died in 1941. Watkins left Hollywood and moved to Florida, close to her elderly mother. She was a lifelong Christian and spent much of her fortune of over $2,300,000 founding contests and chairs in Greek and Bible studies at some 20 universities, including Princeton.

In the 1960s, Watkins was approached by Bob Fosse, who sought the rights to Chicago for a musical adaptation, but she resisted his offers. Following her death from lung cancer in 1969, C. R. Leonard, a trust officer at the Florida National Bank in Jacksonville, handled Watkins' estate and negotiated sale of rights to her play. He later stated that at the time a major heir from the playwright's family informed him that Maurine believed that her newspaper articles had "gained sympathy" for Beulah Annan and that "over the years [she] became disturbed that she had assisted in getting an acquittal for a murderer."

After the much delayed sale of these rights, Fosse was able to move ahead with development of Chicago: A Musical Vaudeville with a score by John Kander and Fred Ebb. It was first produced in 1975, revived in 1997, and filmed in 2002. By the time of the 50th anniversary of Watkins death, Chicago had become a $2 billion franchise.

== Filmography ==
- Chicago (film, 1927); Chicago (play, 1926)
- Up the River (1930) (story)
- Doctors' Wives (1931)
- Play Girl (1932)
- The Strange Love of Molly Louvain (1932) (play Tinsel Girl)
- No Man of Her Own (1932)
- Child of Manhattan (1933)
- Hello, Sister! (1933) (uncredited)
- The Story of Temple Drake (1933) (uncredited)
- Professional Sweetheart (1933)
- Search for Beauty (1934)
- Strictly Dynamite (1934) (story)
- A Wicked Woman (1934) (dialogue)
- Libeled Lady (1936)
- Up the River (remake, 1938) (story)
- I Love You Again (1940) (story)
- Roxie Hart (1942)
- Easy to Wed (1946)
- Chicago (2002) (film)
