= Libeled Lady =

1936 film by Jack Conway

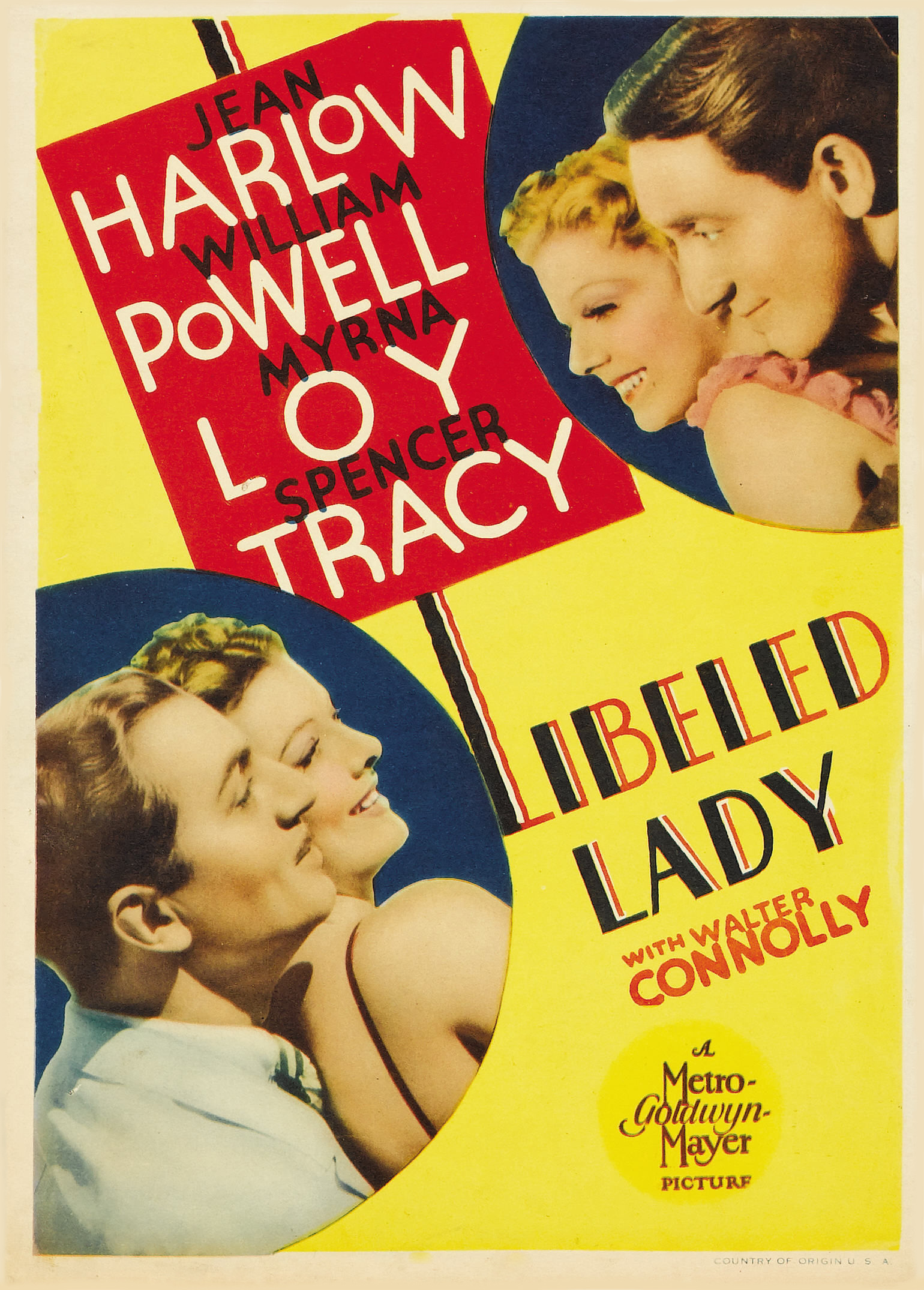
- Theatrical release poster
- Directed by: Jack Conway
- Screenplay by: Maurine Dallas Watkins; Howard Emmett Rogers; George Oppenheimer
- Story by: Wallace Sullivan
- Produced by: Lawrence Weingarten
- Starring: Jean Harlow; William Powell; Myrna Loy; Spencer Tracy; Walter Connolly
- Cinematography: Norbert Brodine
- Edited by: Frederick Y. Smith
- Music by: Dr. William Axt
- Production company: Metro-Goldwyn-Mayer
- Distributed by: Loew's Inc.
- Release date: October 9, 1936
- Running time: 98 minutes
- Country: United States
- Language: English
- Budget: $603,000
- Box office: $2,723,000

Libeled Lady is a 1936 American screwball comedy film starring Jean Harlow, William Powell, Myrna Loy, and Spencer Tracy. It was directed by Jack Conway, with a screenplay by Maurine Dallas Watkins, Howard Emmett Rogers, and George Oppenheimer, from a story by Wallace Sullivan. This was the fifth of fourteen films in which Powell and Loy were teamed, inspired by their success in the Thin Man series.

Libeled Lady was nominated for the Academy Award for Best Picture. The film was remade in 1946 as Easy to Wed with Esther Williams, Van Johnson, and Lucille Ball.

== Plot ==
Wealthy Connie Allenbury is falsely accused of breaking up a marriage and sues the New York Evening Star newspaper for $5 million for libel. Warren Haggerty, the managing editor, turns in desperation to former reporter and suave ladies' man Bill Chandler for help. Bill's scheme is to maneuver Connie into being alone with him when his wife shows up, so that the suit will have to be dropped. Bill is not married, so Warren volunteers his long-suffering fiancée, Gladys Benton, to marry Bill in name only, over her loud protests.

Bill arranges to return to the United States from England on the same ocean liner as Connie and her father J. B. He pays some men to pose as reporters and harass Connie at the dock, so that he can "rescue" her and become acquainted. On the voyage, Connie initially treats him with contempt, assuming that he is just the latest in a long line of fortune hunters after her money, but Bill gradually overcomes her suspicions.

Complications arise when Connie and Bill actually fall in love. They get married, but Gladys decides that she prefers Bill to a marriage-averse newspaperman and interrupts their honeymoon to reclaim her husband. Bill reveals that he found out that Gladys was married before and that her Yucatán divorce was invalid, thus rendering their own marriage invalid. But Gladys reveals she obtained a second divorce in Reno, so she and Bill are legally husband and wife. Connie and Bill manage to show Gladys that she really loves Warren.

== Cast ==
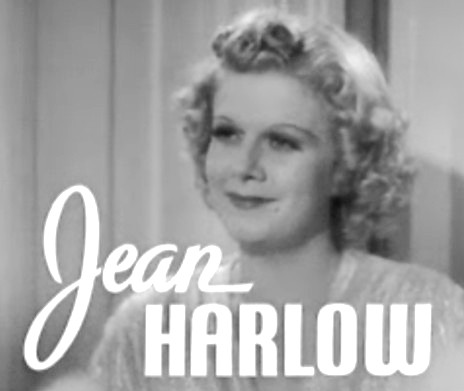
- Jean Harlow as Gladys Benton
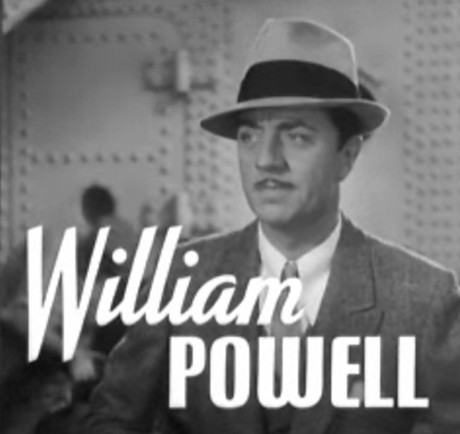
- William Powell as Bill Chandler
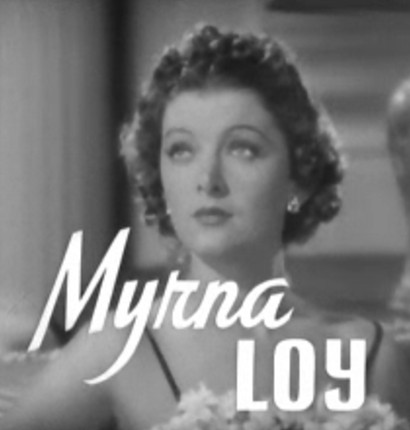
- Myrna Loy as Connie Allenbury
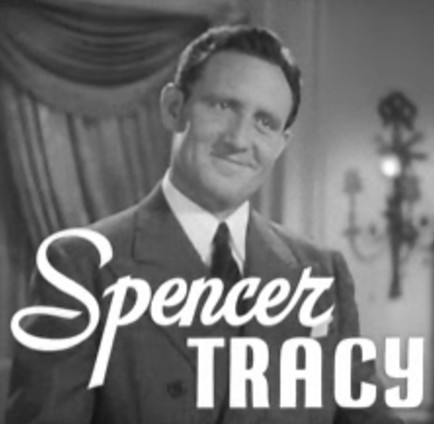
- Spencer Tracy as Warren Haggerty
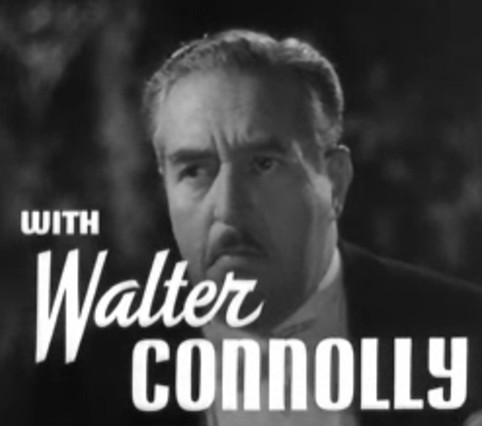
- Walter Connolly as James B. Allenbury
- Charley Grapewin as Hollis Bane, Haggerty's boss
- Cora Witherspoon as Mrs. Burns-Norvell, a talkative acquaintance of the Allenburys
- E. E. Clive as Evans, a fishing instructor
- Lauri Beatty as Babs Burns-Norvell, Mrs. Burns-Norvell's daughter
- Otto Yamaoka as Ching
- Charles Trowbridge as Graham
- Spencer Charters as the magistrate
- George Chandler as the bellhop
- William Benedict as Johnny
- Gwen Lee as the switchboard operator

== Production ==
The film went into production in mid-July 1936 and wrapped on September 1. Location shooting took place in Sonora, California. Lionel Barrymore was originally cast as Mr. Allenbury, and Rosalind Russell was originally considered to play Connie Allenbury.

Harlow and Powell were an off-screen couple, and Harlow wanted to play Connie Allenbury, so that her character and Powell's wound up together. MGM insisted, however, that the film be another William Powell-Myrna Loy vehicle, as they originally intended. Harlow had already signed on to do the film but had to settle for the role of Gladys Benton. Nevertheless, as Gladys, top-billed Harlow got to play a wedding scene with Powell. During filming, Harlow changed her legal name from Harlean Carpenter McGrew Bern Rosson to Jean Harlow. She made only two more films before dying at the age of 26 in 1937.

Tracy had previously been enamored with Loy, who was newly married to Arthur Hornblow Jr. at the time of this production. Loy’s autobiography recounted the humorous atmosphere on the set. For example, Tracy set up an "I hate Hornblow" table in the studio commissary, reserved for men who claimed to have been romantically rejected by Loy.

Two passenger liners made cameos as the ship in the film, Cunard's RMS Berengaria (in the pierside view, as the SS Queen Anne): and France's SS Normandie in an aerial shot.

== Reception ==
=== Box Office ===
The film was released on 9 October 1936, and earned $2.7 million at the box office — $1,601,000 in the U.S. and Canada and $1,122,000 in other markets, resulting in a profit of $1,189,000. It was one of the top twenty box-office successes of the year.

=== Critical response ===
Leslie Halliwell gave it two of four stars in 1989: "Lively four-star romantic comedy which sums up its era as well as any."

Pauline Kael wrote in 1991: "A wisecracking newspaper comedy ... The director, Jack Conway, deeps up the fast pace by a lot of shouting and busywork—people are always rushing in and out, and practically every line is meant to be funny. Some of them are, and the others are, at least, perky. The picture isn't bad—it's enjoyable, but it's rather charmless."

Leonard Maltin gave it four of four stars in 2005: "Wonderful comedy with the four stars working at full steam ... Sit back and enjoy."

== Recognition ==
The film received an Academy Award nomination for 1936 Best Picture but lost to The Great Ziegfeld.
