= Chicago (play) =

Play by Maurine Dallas Watkins

- Written by: Maurine Dallas Watkins
- Characters: Roxie Hart, Velma, Billy Flynn, Attorney Harrison, Babe, Jake, Liz, Moonshine Maggie, Mary Sunshine, Mrs. Morton, Amos Hart
- Genre: Satire
- Setting: Cook County Criminal Court Building and Jail; various other locations in Chicago

Premiere
- Date: December 30, 1926
- Place: Music Box Theatre

Chicago is a play written by Maurine Dallas Watkins. The play, while fiction, is a satire based on two unrelated 1924 court cases involving two women, Beulah Annan (the inspiration for Roxie Hart) and Belva Gaertner (the inspiration for Velma), who were both accused and later acquitted of murder, whom Watkins had covered for the Chicago Tribune as a reporter.

Watkins wrote the script (originally titled Brave Little Woman) as a class assignment while attending the Yale Drama School. Produced by Sam H. Harris, the play debuted on Broadway at the Music Box Theatre on December 30, 1926, directed by George Abbott, where it ran for 172 performances.

The play serves as the inspiration for the stage musical of the same name. To avoid confusion between the two, after the musical version came out, the original was licensed for performance under the title Play Ball.

== Real-life inspiration ==
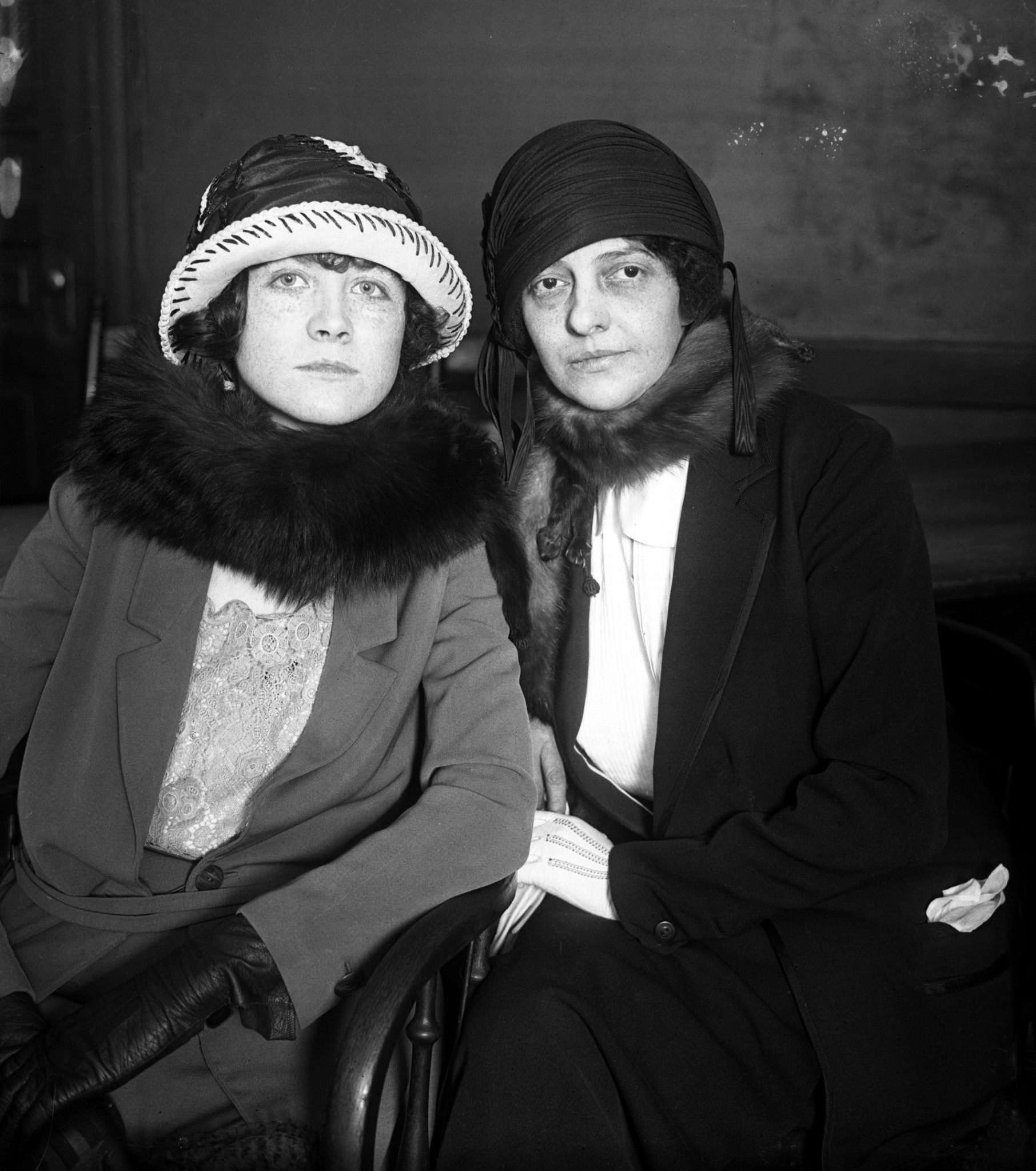
Beulah Annan and Belva Gaertner, 1924

Annan, the model for the character of Roxie Hart, was 23 when she was accused of the April 3, 1924, murder of Harry Kalstedt. The Tribune reported that Annan had played the foxtrot record "Hula Lou" over and over for two hours before calling her husband to say she killed a man who "tried to make love to her". She was found not guilty on May 25, 1924. Annan's husband Albert, a car mechanic who emptied his bank accounts to pay for her defense only to be publicly dumped the day after the trial, served as the basis for Amos Hart. Kalstedt served as the model for Fred Casely. Velma is based on Gaertner (also known as Belle Brown), who was a cabaret singer. The body of Walter Law was discovered slumped over the steering wheel of Gaertner's abandoned car on March 12, 1924. Two police officers testified that they had seen a woman getting into the car and shortly thereafter heard gunshots. A bottle of gin and an automatic pistol were found on the floor of the car. Gaertner was acquitted on June 6, 1924. Lawyers William Scott Stewart and W. W. O'Brien were models for a composite character in Chicago, "Billy Flynn".

== Plot ==
=== Prologue ===
At 7:00 AM on April 3, 1924, Roxie Hart, a 23-year-old described in profile as having the hint of a Raphael angel with a touch of Medusa, kills boyfriend Fred Casely in her South Side apartment. Several hours later, Roxie's husband Amos confesses to the police by saying that Casely was attempting a robbery and that he (Amos) killed him in self-defense. When Amos learns the truth and after an encounter with Assistant State Attorney Harrison, he recants. Roxie is instead charged with the murder.

Jake, a reporter, reassures that she'll be acquitted, and that he'll get her in touch with prolific defense attorney Billy Flynn to take her case. He adds that he'd personally like to see her hanged as this will massively boost sales and that he plans to use her trial to make money while she's still relevant. Harrison, Jake, and photographer Babe talk with Amos and Roxie over the attention they will receive as a result of the incident.

=== Act One ===
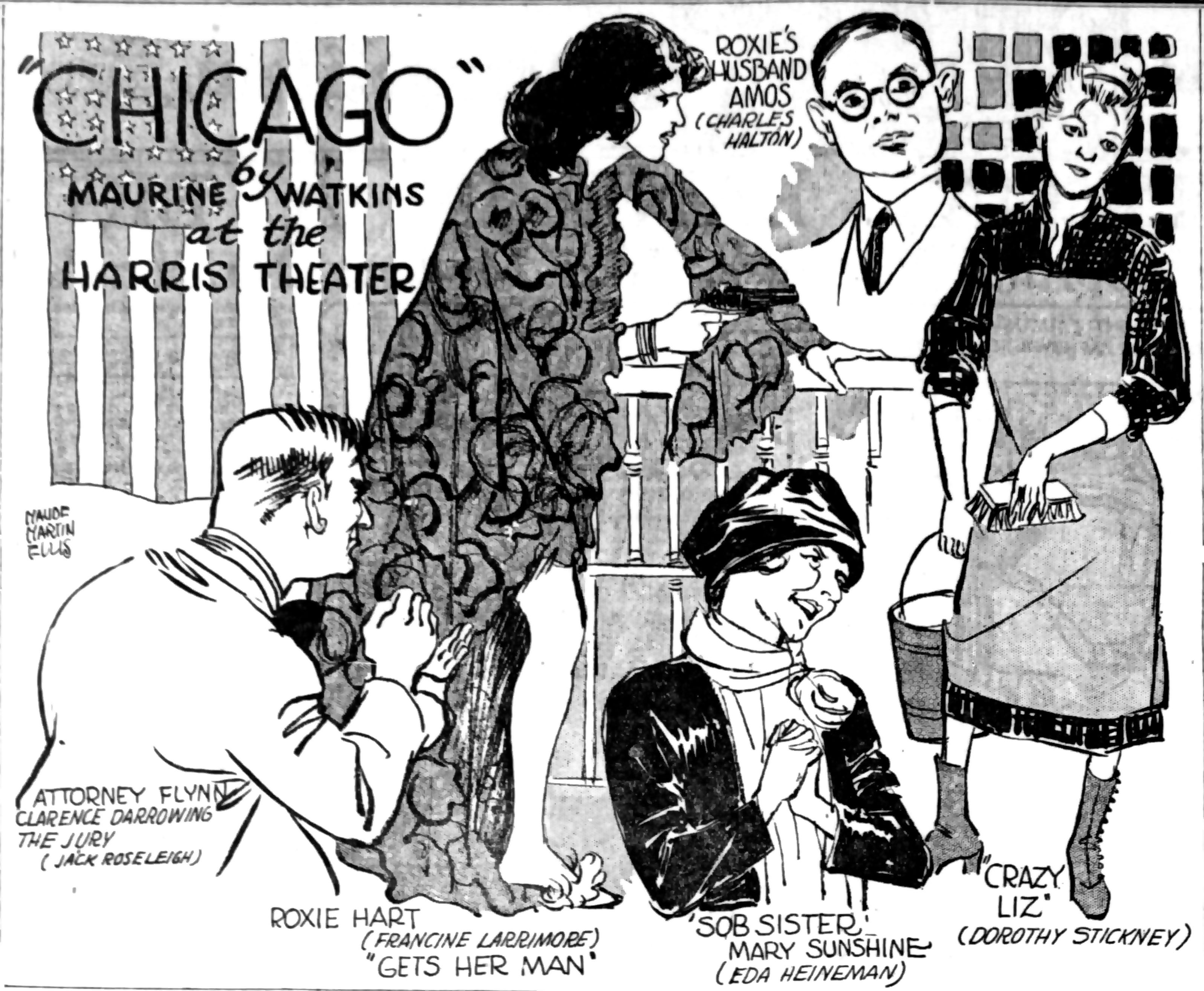
Chicago Tribune image depicting the 1927 Chicago production of the play.

Two days later in the Women's Ward of the Cook County Jail, Roxie, dressed in high-society fashion, complains to the Matron, Mrs. Morton, about the Salvation Army songsters in the Men's Ward. She discovers that day's tabloid and finds herself on the front cover, nicknamed "The Jazz-Slayer", and is overjoyed with the amount of pictures of her on the inside. Velma, a fellow murderess in the ward, expresses sympathy for Roxie's situation, commenting on the shamelessness of reporters. As Roxie and Mrs. Morton clip her columns and pictures from the paper, they notice inaccuracies between what she claims happened and what is being published, including the fact that Roxie wasn't wearing a turban on her arrest.

Velma doubles down on the predatory nature of the tabloid reporters, claiming they deliberately minced words to imply her expensive clothing wasn't authentic, and leaves to get a cigarette. Mrs. Morton warns Roxie to not believe everything the paper says, due to how much it could influence her worldview and opinion of both others and herself. Velma then reveals she had hired another inmate named Lucia to act as maid, due to her 14-year sentence and status as an Italian immigrant.

Liz, a killer who pleads insanity, arrives in the room, laughing maniacally. She proclaims herself a Messenger of God, and attempts to preach to the Matron, Roxie, and Velma before being led out of the room screaming. As the three are about to start a game of bridge, Amos arrives at the window to talk to Roxie, and is quickly surrounded by paparazzi. Babe enters with Amos on permission from Mrs. Morton, and shoots staged pictures of "The Jazz-Slayer" in captivity for his newest scoop, and quickly leaves. Not too long after, Billy Flynn arrives, but due to the lack of funds, he promises that until he is paid, the trial will not go to court.

Billy kicks Amos out, and tells Roxie to change her persona for the press to appeal to the jury. He reveals that he's scooped sob sister Mary Sunshine and an unnamed author from the Chicago Ledger to cover her in a sympathetic light, and that she needs to look more haggard, remorseful, and regretful. Sunshine arrives, followed by Jake, who suggests the idea to Billy of auctioning Roxie's belongings to pay for the trial. Roxie comes down from her interview and expresses displeasure at the idea, but is convinced that her bed would be worth as much as the mirror of Marie Antoinette among other comparisons. The two leave and Roxie continues talking to Mary Sunshine, taking influence from the situations of Velma and Liz, lying about her emotions regarding the murder.

=== Act Two ===
On the afternoon of May 3, one month after Roxie's crime, Velma stands on a table in the ward having her dress hemmed by Mrs. Morton, as a figure sitting in the rocking chair sews, Liz scrubs the floors, and Roxie lounges about. Velma rants about how she had ordered a Marshall Field's dress for her trial, believing them to have sent her an empty box, unaware that Roxie had stolen it. The rocking figure, revealed to be Moonshine Maggie, a Hungarian immigrant jailed for a framed murder via poisoned moonshine, is ushered out for a visit, amidst her crying and moaning.

Jake enters and encounters Mrs. Morton, relaying details about his newest woman criminal scoop, Kitty Baxter. After a brief conversation with Liz, he meets with Roxie, who suggests him some ideas to get her back in the spotlight such as an auction on Velma's dress under the guise that she owned it. Jake pushes back, and tells her to wait until her trial starts before she'll make the papers again. Maggie wails from the other room, and is forcefully brought back to tell Jake and the mocking Mrs. Morton her story in poor English and pleading to see her baby, the lone survivor of her incident, before being sent away to execution, addressing Jake as Uncle Sam in an attempt at gaining forgiveness. Velma leaves for her trial, followed by Mary Sunshine, who is accosted by Roxie for a new story.

Kitty stops Sunshine in the ward, who asks for a few words for her column: receiving "go to Hell". Kitty recounts her robbery career to the reporters, and boasts that the majority of her crimes were committed by her alone. Sunshine is frightened at her admission, and plays nice in the bandit's presence. Roxie and Kitty argue about their popularity in the tabloids, after Kitty says that she'd never heard of her. The argument spirals into a fight, and Roxie feigns unconsciousness to have everyone leave the room. She confides to the Matron, Jake, and Mary Sunshine that she's pregnant, causing all sorts of speculation and attention amongst the reporters regarding potential headlines and stories.

Billy Flynn enters, asking about how this could have happened, with Roxie giving vague answers. Amos arrives, believing himself the father, and is confronted by Billy who convinces him to divorce Roxie as part of her public strategy to her sympathy. Babe photographs Roxie holding Maggie's baby dress she was sewing in the chair, passing it off as her own handiwork.

=== Act Three ===
Seven weeks later, on a morning in June, Billy coaches Roxie on her testimony for her trial. Mary Sunshine and Jake arrive with flowers and gifts for the baby, with Babe inviting Billy for a photograph. Jake stops Roxie, saying that it's a "men only" picture.

Roxie finalizes the payment to Billy, and he coaches her more on her posture and behavior. Through the process, Billy starts to show his true colors as her defense, stating that the deciding factor of the trial will rest on him and that the jury is sick of seeing her face. Roxie and him argue, but upon hearing the judge has arrived, they put on professional facades, with Billy declaring his defendant "a brave little woman" before they begin.

Harrison and Billy cross-examine Amos, asking about his relationship with Roxie and their divorce. Billy grins throughout, his plan falling into place. Amos is bewildered by the questions, and Harrison doubts the legitimacy of asking about divorce during a murder trial. Amos is excused, and states that he is unsure about his paternity to the child.

Roxie takes the stand, accompanied by a newsreel cameraman to shoot her testimony. After a minute or so of simple questions from Billy, the cameras and lighting are removed and the trial continues as normal. Roxie details her affair with Casely, and specifies exact dates and times she and Casely had been together. Roxie pleads not guilty and details the supposed events of the night of the murder, jury transfixed by her plight.

A few hours later, Billy delivers his closing arguments, with Roxie feigning remorse throughout. Another period of time passes, to 10 PM that night. Jake, Billy, and Babe deliberate to the press the trial, with reporters unable to distinguish their lies from truth. Cameras go off, with the judge and Roxie entering the courtroom. The jury finds Roxie not guilty, but within seconds of the verdict, the entire courtroom is drawn away by yet another violent crime, leaving Roxie and Amos alone with Billy.

Roxie announces to the two that she's entering vaudeville, stating that she had been booked at a theater for ten weeks. Amos pleads her to stay, which she denies, stating that she doesn't want to remarry and that she was never pregnant to begin with. Meanwhile, Billy is given a new case: to defend a woman killer nicknamed Machine-Gun Rosie, who meets with him in the courtroom swamped by reporters, including Babe and Jake. Roxie is forced to pose for the cameras with her and refuses, to which Jake ends the show with "Come on, sister, yuh gotta play ball: this is Chicago!"

== Characters ==
Character	Description	Original Broadway performer
Roxie Hart	"The prettiest woman ever charged with murder in Chicago."	Francine Larrimore
Fred Casely	"The other man."	Doan Borup
Amos Hart	"Her [Roxie's] meal ticket husband."	Charles Halton
Billy Flynn	Roxie's attorney - "Best in the city, next to Halliday."	Edward Ellis
Martin S. Harrison	The assistant state's attorney.	Robert Barrat
Charles E. Murdock	A police sergeant	Charles Slattery
Jake	Reporter on The Morning Gazette	Charles A. Bickford
Babe	Photographer on The Morning Gazette	Arthur R. Vinton
Mary Sunshine	Sob sister on The Evening Star	Eda Heineman
Mrs. Morton	Matron at the Cook County Jail	Isabelle Winlocke
Velma	An inmate of Murderess Row - "Stylish divorcée"	Juliette Crosby
Liz	An inmate of Murderess Row - "God's messenger"	Dorothy Stickney
Moonshine Maggie	An inmate of Murderess Row - "Hunyak"	Ferike Boros
Go-to-Hell Kitty	An inmate of Murderess Row - "The Tiger Girl"	Edith Fitzgerald

== Notable productions ==
The play debuted on Broadway at the Music Box Theatre on December 30, 1926, running until May 28, 1927. The production was directed by George Abbott and produced by Sam H. Harris. The opening night cast featured Francine Larrimore (Roxie), Doan Borup (Fred), Charles Halton (Amos), and Edward Ellis (Billy).

After previously being banned by the Lord Chamberlain, the play opened on the West End on May 13, 1935 at the Gate Theatre Studio. The production was directed by Norman Marshall with sets by Hedley Briggs. Vincent Price - in one of his earliest roles - played Charles E. Murdock.

== Adaptations ==
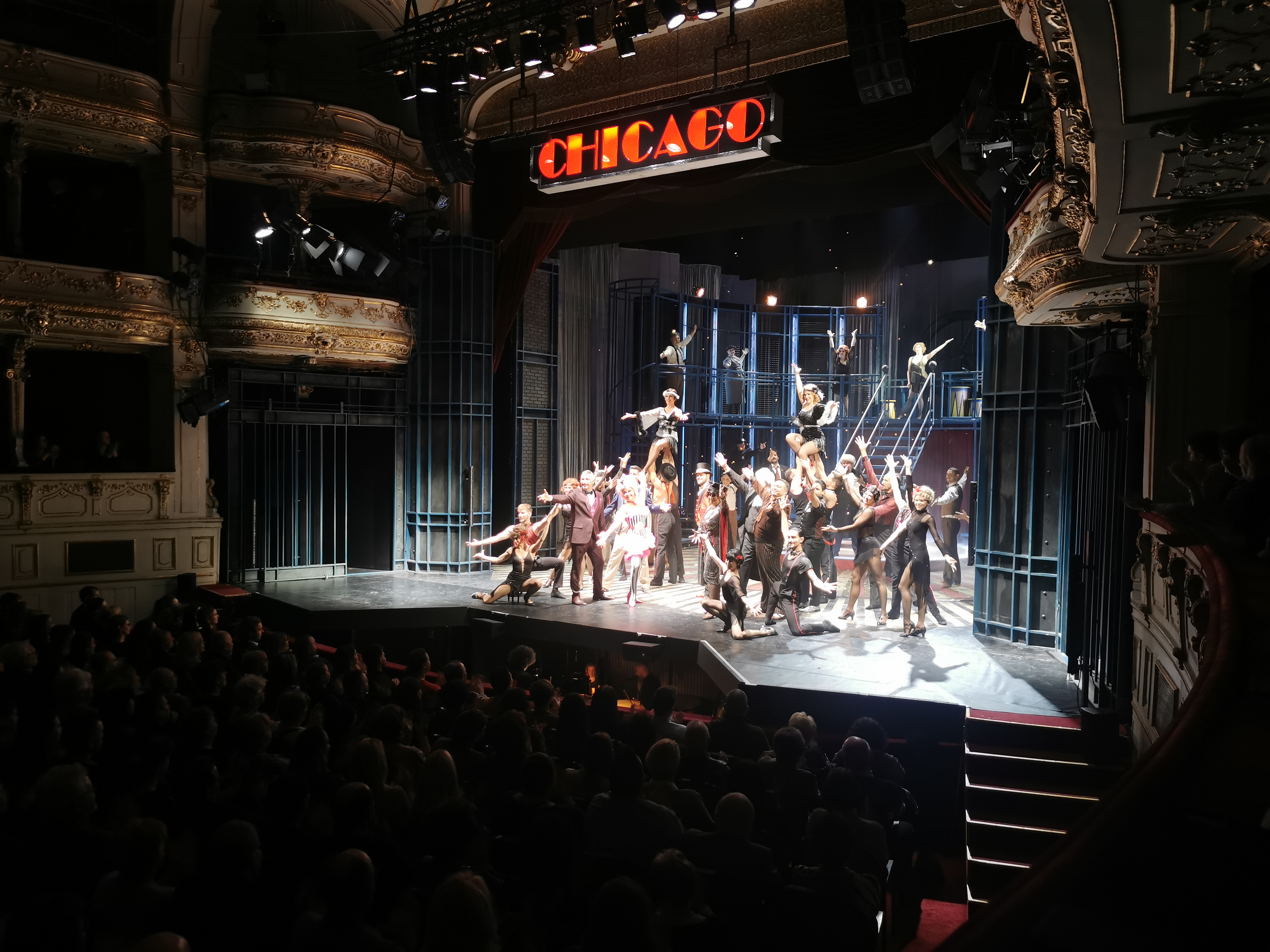
Adaptation in Pécs, Hungary, January 2024

Cecil B. DeMille produced a silent film version, Chicago (1927), starring former Mack Sennett bathing beauty Phyllis Haver as Roxie Hart. In comparing the play to the silent movie, critic Michael Phillips writes, "Watkins' play is harsh, satirical and cynical; the movie, less so. It's more of a melodrama, and to appease the censor boards, producer DeMille meted out punishment to his sinning characters where none existed previously."

The story was adapted again as the 1942 film Roxie Hart starring Ginger Rogers; but in this version, due to the prevailing censorship code and social mores, Roxie was innocent of the murder charge against her.

In the 1960s, Gwen Verdon read the play and asked her husband, Bob Fosse, about the possibility of creating a musical adaptation. Fosse approached playwright Watkins numerous times to buy the rights, but she repeatedly declined. However, upon her death in 1969, her estate sold the rights to producer Richard Fryer, Verdon, and Fosse. John Kander and Fred Ebb began work on the musical score, modeling each number on a traditional vaudeville number or performer. This format made explicit the play and musical's comparison between "justice", "show-business", and contemporary society. Ebb and Fosse penned the book of the musical, and Fosse also directed and choreographed. The musical version in turn was adapted as the 2002 film Chicago, starring Renee Zellweger, Richard Gere and Catherine Zeta-Jones; this adaptation won the Academy Award for Best Picture at the 75th Academy Awards.

== See also ==
- Machinal, another play from the 1920s, inspired by a real-life case of a woman convicted of murder
- The Front Page, another play from the 1920s, inspired by news coverage of the Chicago criminal justice system
