= Roxie Hart =

Character from the 1927 play Chicago

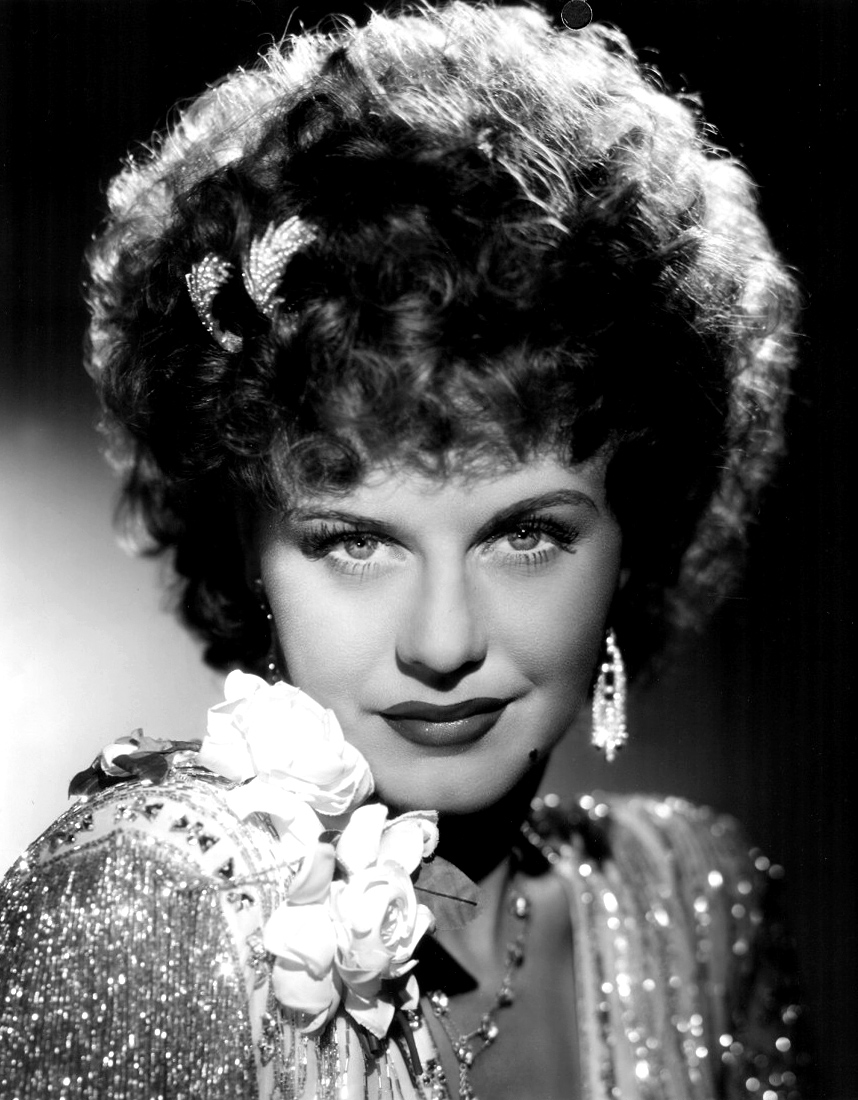
Roxie Hart as portrayed by Ginger Rogers in the eponymous 1942 film

Roxanne "Roxie" Hart is a fictional character. She is the main character of the 1926 play Chicago and its various remakes and derivatives.

== Development ==
The playwright, reporter Maurine Dallas Watkins, was inspired by the trials, both of which ended in acquittals, of Beulah Annan and Belva Gaertner (for separate crimes), which she covered for the Chicago Tribune. Annan's story served as the basis for the play: she had killed her paramour Harry Kalstedt and was able to convince her auto mechanic husband Albert to pay for her successful defense, only to dump him the day after the trial. For the play, Annan was fictionalized as Roxie Hart, Kalstedt became Fred Casely, and Albert became Amos Hart. Some of the details of Gaertner's crime, including her past as a vaudeville singer (Annan was a bookkeeper) and blaming of her misdeed on getting drunk, were also applied to the Roxie character. The 1975 musical adaptation bases Hart's mannerisms on Helen Morgan.

== Character background ==
During her time as a young adult, Roxanne dreamed of a career in vaudeville but, despite dating noted mobster Al Capelli and getting some press attention as a socialite, is never able to break into the business beyond some work as a chorus girl in a seedy nightclub on Chicago's South Side. Defeated, she falls for auto mechanic Amos Hart, a kind-hearted but meek and naïve man with a stable working-class income; his relationship with Roxie is more akin to that of a father figure (her own father disowned her three years before she met Amos) than a romantic partner. Seven years into the marriage, she and Amos have stopped having sex and she begins an affair with Fred Casely, a furniture salesman, while Amos is working his long hours. At the start of the show, Roxie shoots Fred after he attempts to break off the affair and convinces Amos that she was stopping a burglar.

After Amos reneges on an agreement to take the fall when he deduces the truth, Roxie is arrested for the crime and, while being detained, falls under the influence of the prison's bribe-taking warden, "Mama" Morton, who has the connections to turn Roxie's case into a media sensation and also connects her to hotshot lawyer Billy Flynn. Roxie uses the media coverage as a way for her to revive her aspirations of a vaudeville career, with Flynn and Morton helping along the way. Throughout her trial, she forms a rivalry with another murder suspect, Velma Kelly.

In the end, Roxie is acquitted of the crime, Amos leaves her (both for lack of attention and lying about being pregnant to gain sympathy from the press), and her dreams of superstardom are dashed when the media abandons her story. She eventually achieves her dream of performing vaudeville, joining Velma's double act to replace Velma's sister Veronica, whom Velma was acquitted of killing.

== Portrayals ==
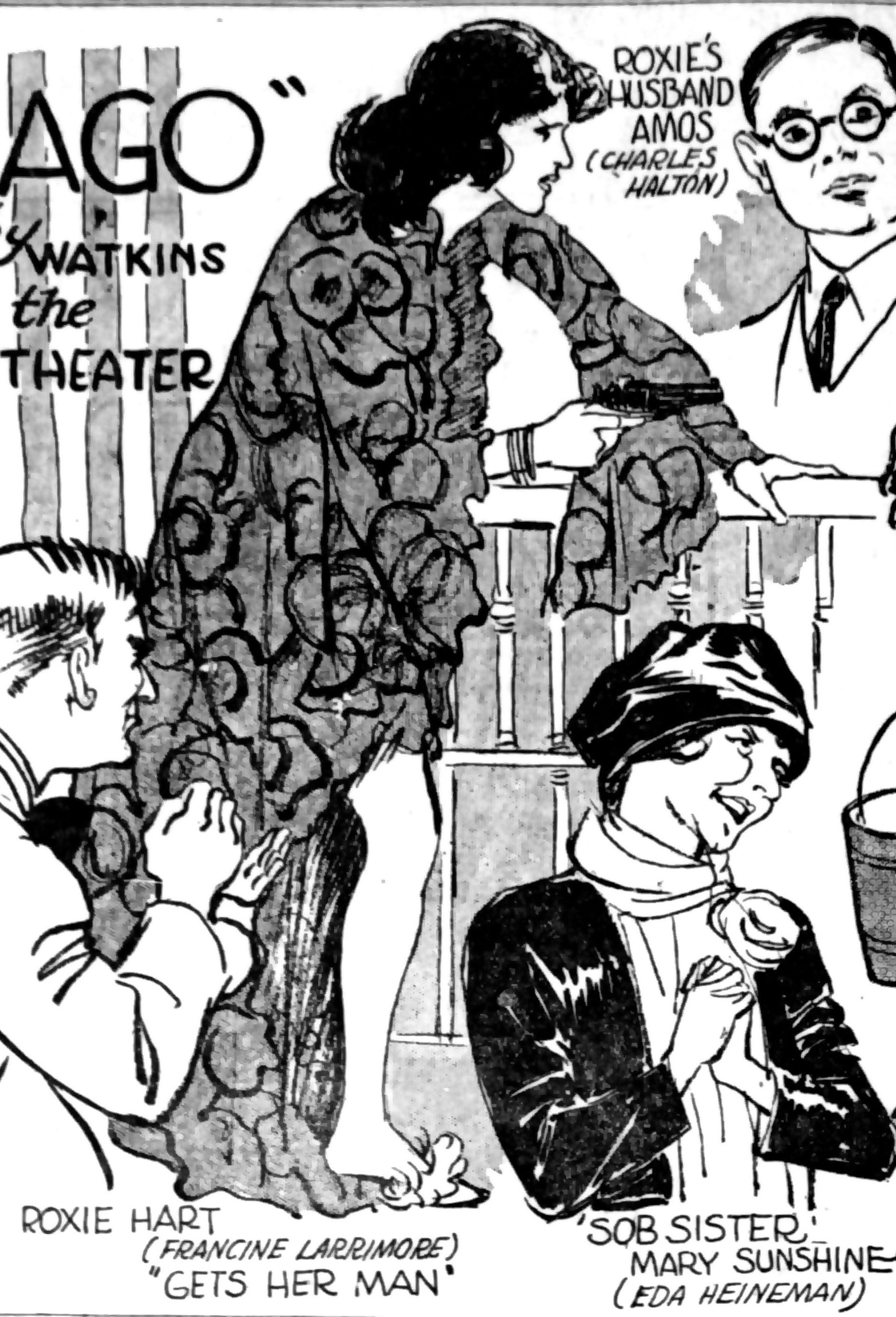
Role originator Francine Larrimore portrays Roxie in a Chicago Tribune portrait from the Chicago production.

The play made it to Broadway in 1926 and ran for 172 performances. Francine Larrimore originated the role and then took it on the road as the play toured elsewhere, including Chicago. Gaertner attended the Chicago opening. Its adaptations include:

- Chicago, a 1927 silent film, with Phyllis Haver playing Roxie
- Roxie Hart, a 1942 film starring Ginger Rogers as Roxie. This adaptation is notable for her husband Amos being the real murderer, but Roxie going along with it as a boost to her career
- Chicago, the original 1975 Broadway stage musical, featuring Gwen Verdon, and its 1996 revival, which starred Ann Reinking
- Chicago, an Oscar-winning 2002 film adapted from the 1975 musical (and its 1996 revival), starring Renée Zellweger as Roxie

Performers who have portrayed Roxie Hart in the musical also include Katherine Edgar, Ariana Madix, Paige Davis, Erika Jayne, Lisa Rinna, Liza Minnelli (who substituted for Gwen Verdon in the original production in 1975), Ann Reinking, Bianca Marroquin, Brooke Shields, Ruthie Henshall, Melora Hardin, Ashlee Simpson, Melanie Griffith, Samantha Harris, Michelle Williams, Shiri Maimon, Christie Brinkley, Desi Oakley, Brandy Norwood, Tiffany Young, Rumer Willis, Alyssa Milano, Pamela Anderson, Olivia Holt and Whitney Leavitt. Brinkley, Henshall, Simpson, Shields, and Williams have portrayed the character both on Broadway and The West End. Bebe Neuwirth, who won a Tony Award for the role of Velma Kelly in 1997, also portrayed Roxie in the same production in 2006. Ashley Graham played Roxie Hart in her Broadway debut.
