= Roxie Hart (film) =

1942 film by William A. Wellman

- 1942 theatrical poster
- Directed by: William A. Wellman
- Screenplay by: Nunnally Johnson
- Based on: Chicago by Maurine Dallas Watkins
- Produced by: Nunnally Johnson
- Starring: Ginger Rogers; Adolphe Menjou; George Montgomery
- Narrated by: George Montgomery
- Cinematography: Leon Shamroy
- Edited by: James B. Clark
- Music by: Alfred Newman
- Distributed by: 20th Century Fox
- Release date: February 20, 1942
- Running time: 74 minutes
- Country: United States
- Language: English
- Box office: $1.1 million (US rentals)

Roxie Hart (also known as Chicago or Chicago Gal) is a 1942 American comedy film directed by William A. Wellman, and starring Ginger Rogers, Adolphe Menjou and George Montgomery. This film adapts the 1926 play Chicago by Maurine Dallas Watkins, a journalist who found inspiration in two real-life Chicago trials (Beulah Annan and Belva Gaertner) she had covered for the press. The play had been adapted once prior, in a 1927 silent film, and was adapted again in 1975 as a hit stage musical, which itself was adapted as the Oscar-winning 2002 musical film.

The screenplay by Nunnally Johnson focuses on a Chicago showgirl who confesses to a murder in hopes the publicity will help her faltering show business career. In the original play and its other adaptations, Roxie is guilty but is acquitted. However, in order to conform to the Motion Picture Production Code, which regulated moral guidelines for Hollywood films at the time, the 1946 adaptation portrays Roxie as innocent but misguided in her attempt to achieve fame.

== Plot ==
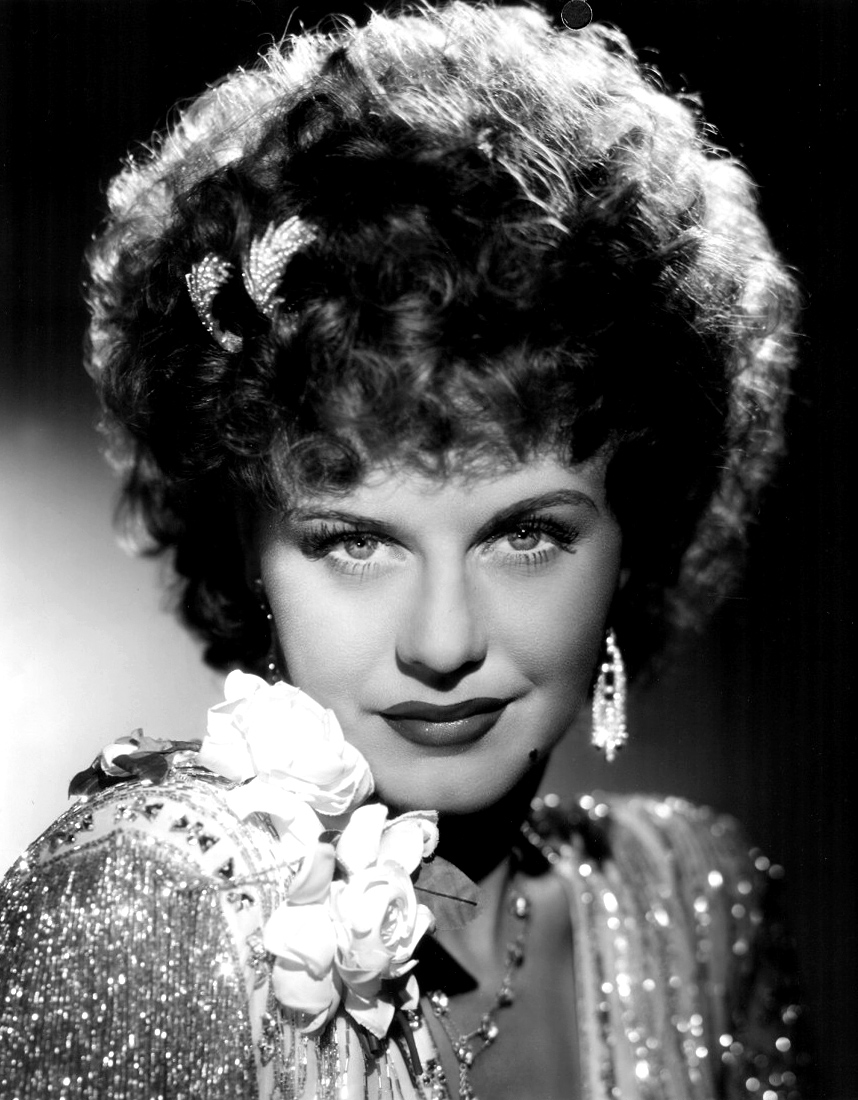
Ginger Rogers as Roxie Hart

Stuart Chapman starts a new job as a newspaper reporter in Chicago, where he is pulled into a murder investigation together with his new colleague, veteran reporter Homer Howard. As they sit in a bar having a drink after a long day, Homer starts telling about a case he reported on in 1927: a murder case involving the young dancer Roxie Hart.

Back in 1927, a theatre booking agent, Fred Casely, has been murdered, and his body is found in Roxie Hart's apartment. Roxie's husband Amos is questioned by the police. Reporter Jake Callahan and Casely's partner E. Clay Benham reason with Roxie about what to do. They persuade her to let herself get arrested for the murder, even though she knows her husband is guilty, because a woman is unlikely to get convicted of murder in Chicago. Also, the fame she would earn for taking the blame might improve her fading career.

In jail, Roxie talks to reporters about the case, including Homer, who (at the time) is just starting out as a journalist. Her husband also gets her the best lawyer money can buy, Billy Flynn, known for making a big show in the courtroom.

Billy decides that they will use the fact that Roxie is a weak woman and claim she killed the man in self-defense. Billy sets up a series of interviews with journalists and reporters. Roxie is instructed to charm the reporters and perform her trademark dance, "The Black Hula."

Homer is one of the reporters charmed by Roxie. He also finds out from her apartment building's janitor, Michael Finnegan, that Amos is the real killer. Homer decides to help Roxie. When the press turns to report on another "lady criminal," Gertie Baxter, and publicity turns in favor of a tougher treatment of women criminals, Roxie pretends to be pregnant to sway public opinion back to her side.

To buy time to create sympathy for Roxie, Billy moves her trial further into the future. He gets Amos to divorce her. Roxie still doesn't trust the legal system completely, and asks Billy to find Finnegan and get him to testify in court on her behalf. It turns out that Finnegan is dead and the written statement he left before he died is judged as inadmissible evidence.

Roxie faints in front of the jury, which helps her case tremendously. She is found not guilty of the murder, but Amos is arrested instead, stealing the publicity from Roxie. Out of the limelight, Roxie has to choose between marrying the poor reporter Homer or a rich member of the jury, stockbroker O'Malley.

In present time, 1942, Homer finishes his story and gets up. He speaks to the bartender, who turns out to be O'Malley, the former stockbroker, who lost everything in the 1929 stock market crash. A moment later, Homer is picked up from the bar by his wife, Roxie, who arrives with their six children and announces she is pregnant with another.

== Cast ==
- Ginger Rogers as Roxanne "Roxie" Hart
- Adolphe Menjou as William "Billy" Flynn
- George Montgomery as Homer Howard
- Lynne Overman as Jake Callahan
- Nigel Bruce as E. Clay Benham
- Phil Silvers as Babe
- Sara Allgood as Mrs. Morton
- William Frawley as O'Malley
- Spring Byington as Mary Sunshine
- Ted North as Stuart Chapman
- Helene Reynolds as Velma Wall
- George Chandler as Amos Hart
- Charles D. Brown as Charles E. Murdock
- Morris Ankrum as Martin S. Harrison
- George Lessey as Judge Cannon
- Iris Adrian as 'Two-Gun' Gertie Baxter
- Milton Parsons as Announcer
- Frank Darien as Michael Finnegan (uncredited)

== Production ==
Roxie Hart was originally supposed to star Alice Faye but pregnancy prevented her from taking on the role.

== Reception ==
Writing in Time in 1942, critic James Agee stated, "Although Roxie Hart makes a hilarious burlesque of Chicago's Keep-Cool-With-Coolidge, Keep-Cockeyed-With-Capone era, it is often too overdone for superior farce. Mouthpiece Menjou and Newsman Overman make mincemeat of their fat roles; America's own Ginger Rogers is attractive but unbelievable in hers. The star plays second fiddle to the era."

The film received positive reviews from critics. On review aggregator website Rotten Tomatoes, it has an 82% score, based on 11 reviews, with an average rating of 7.10/10.

Stanley Kubrick listed it as one of his top 10 favorite films.
