= Velma Kelly =

Character from the 1927 play Chicago

- Chicago character
- Created by: Maurine Dallas Watkins
- Portrayed by: Broadway stage: Chita Rivera; Bebe Neuwirth; Ute Lemper; Ruthie Henshall; Caroline O'Connor; Reva Rice; Pia Douwes; Irish production: Lisa Kelly; 2013 Hollywood Bowl production: Samantha Barks; 2002 film version: Catherine Zeta-Jones; Silent film version: Julia Faye; Stage play: Juliette Crosby; Roxie Hart: Helene Reynolds

In-universe information
- Species: Human
- Gender: Female
- Occupation: Vaudevillian; Murderer; Nightclub singer
- Relatives: Sister: Veronica; Husband: Charlie
- Nationality: American
- Residence: Chicago, Illinois, United States

Velma Kelly is one of the main characters in the successful 1975 Broadway musical Chicago. Kelly is based on the character "Velma", who first appeared in the 1926 play, also called Chicago, who was in-turn inspired by events in the life of Belva Gaertner.

== Character background ==
Kelly is a nightclub singer/vaudevillian who had mediocre success as part of an acrobatics double act with her sister Veronica until, when she catches Veronica with her husband Charlie while on tour, she presumably kills them both (though she denies remembering it). She is sent to the Cook County Jail where she hires the best soliciting lawyer, Billy Flynn, a master of turning cases into a media circus to free his clients. The attention prompts an offer from the William Morris Agency to pay her more than fourteen times what she had made as her share of the proceeds from the double act with Veronica—once she is acquitted.

Kelly's plans are upended when Roxie Hart, a failed vaudeville aspirant accused of murdering her paramour, arrives in the jail and hires Flynn, who promptly shifts the media circus to Hart and away from Kelly. William Morris drops their offer, and Kelly remains resentful of Hart for the rest of the show, though she begrudgingly concedes that her act needs a partner and that Roxie fits the bill.

Kelly is ultimately acquitted offstage; she and Roxie end up co-headlining a vaudeville tour.

== Historical basis ==
Velma Kelly's character was based on a woman named Belva Gaertner. Belva was a cabaret singer who had been married and divorced twice. After those men had come and gone, she had a lover named Walter Law, who she thought was the right man for her. On March 11, 1924, Belva allegedly shot Law, who was already married with one child. Law was found in the front seat of Belva's car with a bottle of gin and a gun beside him that had discharged three cartridges. The next day, she was found at her apartment with bloody clothes on the floor. She claimed that she had been drunk and couldn't remember what had happened. She was arrested for the murder of Walter Law on March 12, 1924. During her interview with Maurine Watkins, Gaertner told Watkins that "gin and guns—either one is bad enough, but together they get you in a dickens of a mess, don't they." Her defense in court was that he could have committed suicide, and she was released in June 1924. She remarried her husband William Gaertner and was later convicted of drunk driving in 1926. In 1927, she attended the opening of Watkins' play Chicago in Chicago, Illinois.

For the musical, Kelly's mannerisms were based upon Texas Guinan, one of the most famous vaudeville performers of the era.

== Notable portrayals ==
Women who have portrayed Velma on the Broadway stage include: Chita Rivera, Caroline O'Connor, Bebe Neuwirth, Jasmine Guy, Reva Rice, Pia Douwes and Ute Lemper. She was portrayed by Lisa Kelly in the Irish production. Samantha Barks starred as Velma in the 2013 Hollywood Bowl production.

In 1999, Neuwirth had to go back on stage and play Velma Kelly with only two days' notice because Lemper, who was supposed to play her, was battling laryngitis and the flu for two weeks so her doctor recommended that she take some time off to rest. In 1997, Neuwirth won a Tony Award, a Drama Desk Award, and a Fred Astaire Award for her performance as Velma Kelly. Neuwirth came back 10 years later and played the other murderer, Roxie Hart. In 2014, she appeared in a limited engagement as Mama Morton. The 2002 film version of the musical features Catherine Zeta-Jones as Velma Kelly. She received the Academy Award for Best Supporting Actress and a BAFTA Film Award for her role.

Prior to the 1975 debut of the stage musical, Kelly appeared in the earlier incarnations of Watkins' story. In the original non-musical play that debuted on December 30, 1926, and in the silent film version released on December 27, 1927, Velma had no last name and was a smaller role, billed as a "stylish divorcée" among the other inmates at the jail. This version of Velma was played by Juliette Crosby in the stage play and by Julia Faye in the silent film. In the 1942 film Roxie Hart, she was given the last name Wall and portrayed by Helene Reynolds.

== Musical numbers ==
Throughout the musical, Velma Kelly has many songs and dances that she performs, whether it be by herself or with an ensemble of people. The musical numbers she performs are:

- "All That Jazz" – performed in the opening act when she returns to the stage after killing her husband and sister, who were supposed to be part of the act as well. Once she is done performing, she is arrested for the murder she committed prior to the show.
- "Cell Block Tango" – Kelly and the rest of the women that have been convicted of murder explain their side of the story on how their husbands/lovers died through song and dance.
- "I Can't Do It Alone" – Since the media has lately focused solely on Roxie, Velma comes up with an idea that can put her back in the press. Velma tries to convince Hart to join her in a double-act, going through the different choreographies, verses, and stages of her performances that she did with her sister, knowing that it was once Hart's dream to be on stage with Velma.
- "My Own Best Friend" – Kelly and Hart, after both have been completely forgotten by the media, sing that the only people they can count on are themselves.
- "I Know a Girl" – Velma bitterly sings to the audience about Roxie Hart's recent good luck and notoriety.
- "When Velma Takes The Stand" – Velma sings to Billy Flynn what she plans to do at her trial when she takes the stand.
- "Class" – Matron "Mama" Morton and Velma Kelly lament the disappearing morals in modern society, using many vulgar obscenities.
- "Nowadays" – The Hart/Kelly duo start their performance with this song.
- "Hot Honey Rag" – After singing "Nowadays", Kelly and Hart perform this dance.
