= Chicago (1927 film) =

1927 film by Frank John Urson

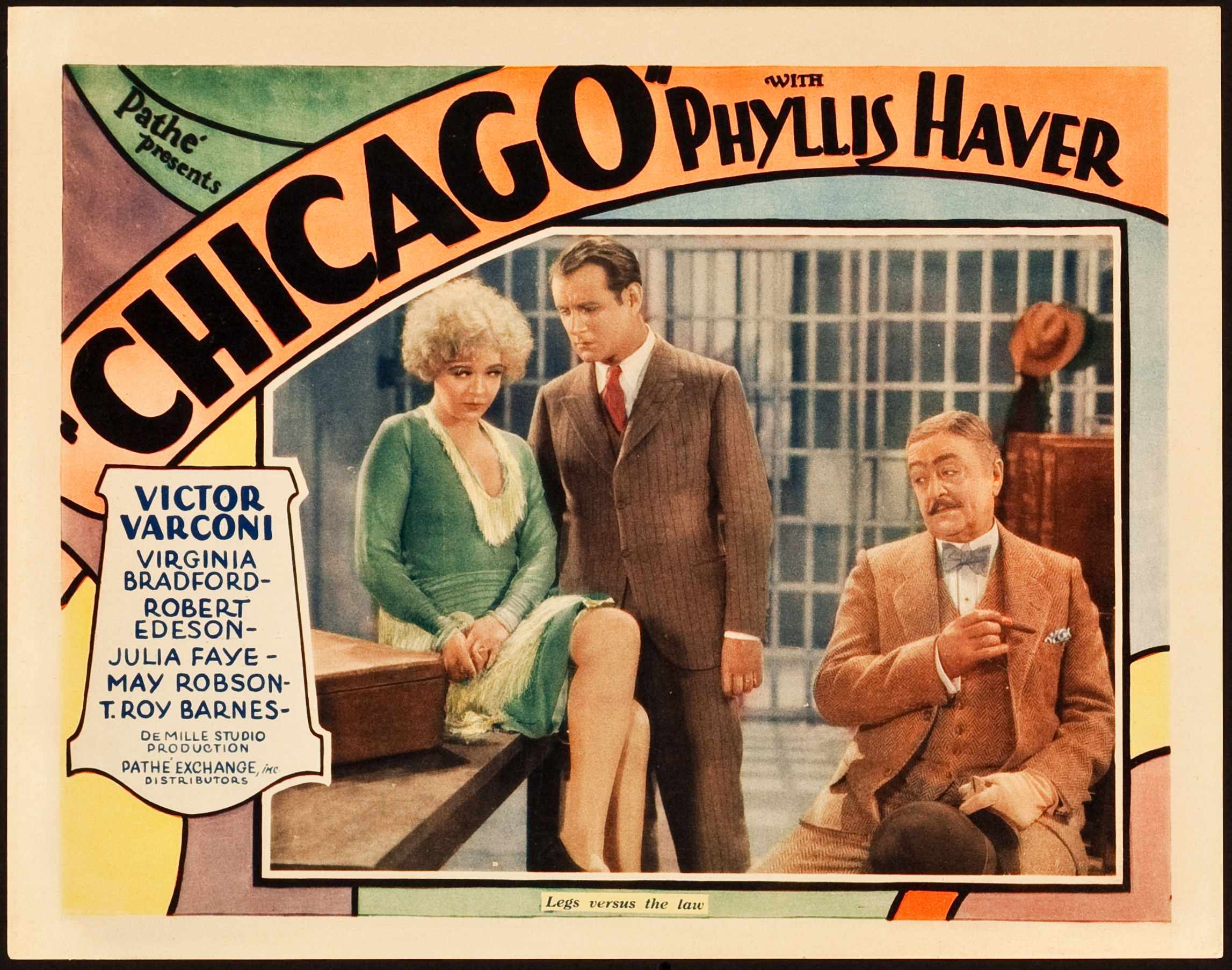
- Lobby card
- Directed by: Frank Urson; Cecil B. DeMille (uncredited)
- Screenplay by: Lenore J. Coffee
- Based on: Chicago; 1926 play by Maurine Dallas Watkins
- Produced by: Cecil B. DeMille
- Starring: Phyllis Haver; Julia Faye; Victor Varconi; May Robson
- Cinematography: J. Peverell Marley
- Edited by: Anne Bauchens
- Distributed by: Pathé Exchange
- Release date: December 27, 1927
- Running time: 103 minutes
- Country: United States
- Language: Silent (English intertitles)
- Budget: $303,306
- Box office: $483,165

Chicago (1927)

Chicago is a 1927 American silent crime comedy-drama film produced by Cecil B. DeMille and directed by Frank Urson. The first film adaptation of Maurine Dallas Watkins' 1926 play of the same name, the film stars Phyllis Haver as Roxie Hart, a fame-obsessed housewife who kills her lover in cold blood and, after trying to coerce her husband into taking the blame, is put on trial for murder.

== Plot ==
The plot of the film is drawn from the 1926 play Chicago by Maurine Dallas Watkins which was in turn based on the true story of Beulah Annan, fictionalized as Roxie Hart (Phyllis Haver), and her spectacular murder of her boyfriend.

The silent film adds considerably to the material in Watkins' play, some additions based on the original murder, and some for Hollywood considerations. The murder, which occurs in a very brief vignette before the play begins, is fleshed out considerably. Also, Roxie's husband Amos Hart has a much more sympathetic and active role in the film than he does either in the play or in the subsequent musical. The original ending is altered to have Roxie punished for her crime.

== Cast ==
- Phyllis Haver as Roxie Hart
- Victor Varconi as Amos Hart
- Virginia Bradford as Katie
- Robert Edeson as William Flynn
- Eugene Pallette as Rodney Casley
- Warner Richmond as Asst. District Attorney
- T. Roy Barnes as Reporter
- Clarence Burton as Police sergeant
- Julia Faye as Velma
- May Robson as Matron Mrs. Morton
- Viola Louie as Two Gun Rosie

== Preservation and availability ==
Complete prints of Chicago are held by:

- Archives du Film du CNC
- Cinematheque Royale de Belgique
- Filmoteka Narodowa in Warsaw
- Museum Of Modern Art (on 35 mm and 16 mm)
- Gosfilmofond
- Arhiva Națională de Filme
- George Eastman Museum
- UCLA Film and Television Archive (on 35 mm)
- Cinémathèque française

The film was long difficult to see, but in 2006 the UCLA Film and Television Archive restored a 35 mm print, which was screened at Kansas Silent Film Festival in 2007. Flicker Alley released the film on DVD in 2010 and later on Blu-ray on October 6, 2020.

== Adaptations ==
The plot was adapted into a stage musical in 1975 with music and lyrics by John Kander and Fred Ebb and received rave reviews. A 1996 City Center Encores! production received critical acclaim and later transferred to Broadway, ultimately becoming the longest-running musical revival on Broadway. The stage musical was made into a musical film in 2002, starring Renée Zellweger as Roxie, Catherine Zeta-Jones as fellow murderess Velma Kelly, Richard Gere as Billy Flynn, Queen Latifah as Mama Morton, and John C. Reilly as Amos. The film was also a hit and won the Academy Award for Best Picture in 2003.

== See also ==
- Chicago (play)
- Roxie Hart (1942)
- Chicago (musical)
- Chicago (2002)
