= Beulah Annan =

American suspected murderer (1899–1928)

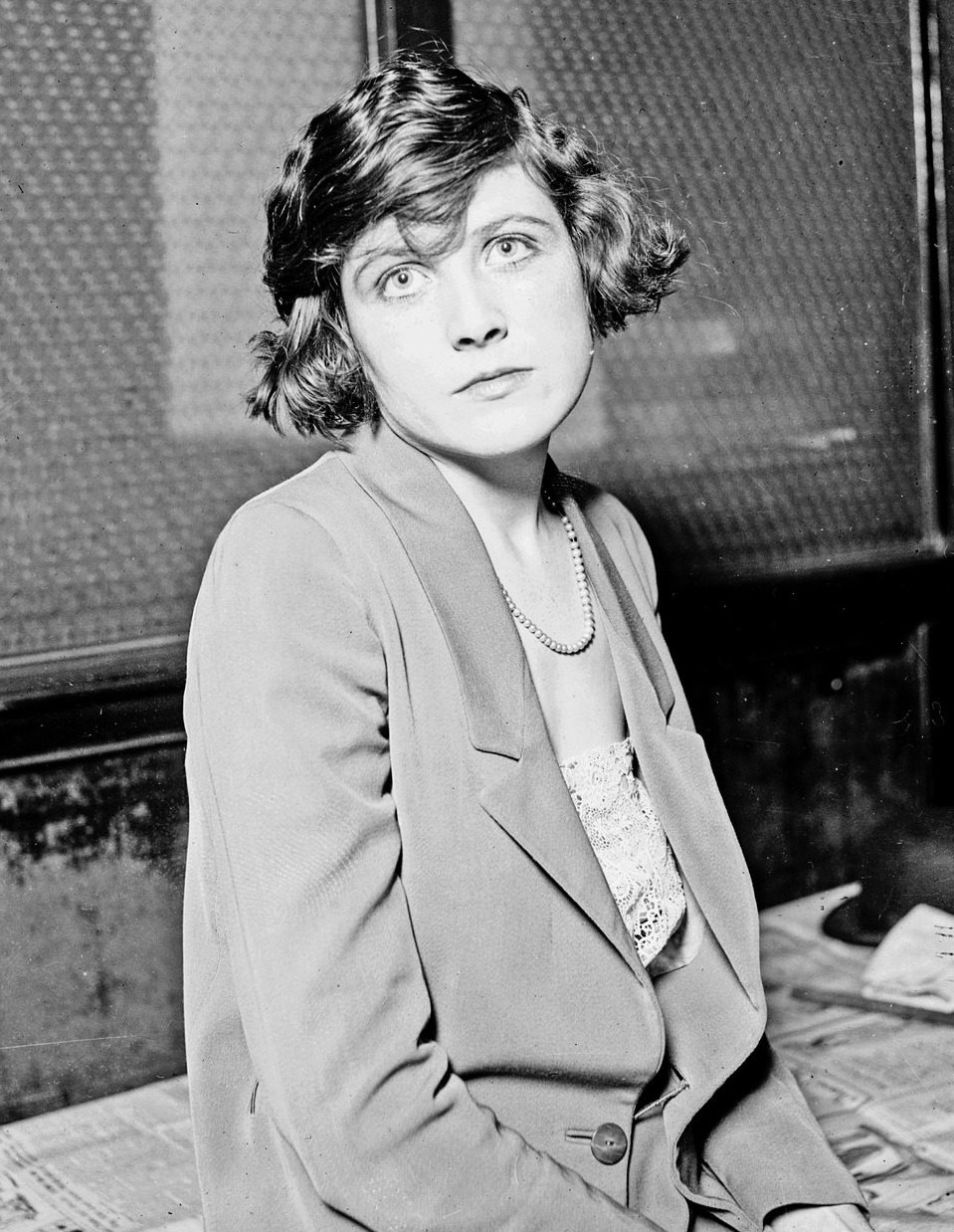
- Annan circa April 4, 1924, the day after the murder
- Born: Beulah May Sheriff; November 18, 1899; Owensboro, Kentucky, U.S.
- Died: March 10, 1928 (aged 28); Chicago, Illinois, U.S.
- Resting place: Daviess County, Kentucky, U.S.
- Other name: Beulah Stephens
- Known for: Inspiration for Roxie Hart in Chicago
- Spouses: Perry Stephens (until 1920) Albert "Al" Annan (m. 1920; div. 1926) Edward Harlib (m. 1927; div. 1927)
- Partner: Harry Kalstedt (1920-24)

Beulah May Annan (née Sheriff; November 18, 1899 – March 10, 1928) was an American suspected murderer. Her story inspired Maurine Dallas Watkins's play Chicago in 1926. The play was adapted into a 1927 silent film, a 1975 stage musical, and a 2002 movie musical (which won the Academy Award for Best Picture), all with that title, and a 1942 romantic comedy film, Roxie Hart, named for the character who Annan inspired.

== Early life ==
Beulah May Sheriff was born in Owensboro, Kentucky, to Mary (née Neel) and John R. Sheriff. While living in Kentucky, she married her first husband, newspaper Linotype operator Perry Stephens. After they divorced, Beulah met car mechanic Albert Annan, and moved with him to Chicago, where they got married on March 29, 1920.

In Chicago, Albert Annan found work as a mechanic at a garage and Beulah became a bookkeeper at Tennant's Model Laundry. At the laundry she met Harry Kalsted [misspelled Kalstedt by the press], and the two began an affair.

== The homicide ==
On April 3, 1924, in the married couple's bedroom, Annan shot Kalsted. According to the autopsy, the bullet passed laterally through Kalsted's torso. The bullet's path made it difficult to judge whether Kalsted was turned sideways to move away from Annan when she shot him or was turned sideways toward her, perhaps reaching to take the gun away from her.

According to Annan's initial story, Kalsted attempted to rape her, so she retreated to the bedroom, picked up the gun off the unmade bed (her husband being in the habit of keeping the gun under his pillow), and shot Kalsted as he came toward her.

After intensive interrogation at the Hyde Park police station, she eventually admitted that she and Kalsted had been having an affair, that she invited him to bring her wine, that they "had a jazz" (sex) on the couch, and that they got into a heated argument over the fact that he had been lying to her and everyone else about his sordid past. At some point Kalsted "jumped up", she said, and they both "beat it for the bedroom," where they simultaneously reached for the gun on the bed. She got the revolver first and shot him, she explained. During this interrogation, she was never asked why she shot Kalsted or what Kalsted did just before she shot him. Hence, her answers, on which the prosecution nevertheless relied in court, did not disclose whether Kalsted was retreating when she shot him, as the prosecution claimed, or trying to take the gun from her, another plausible possibility.

After wiping Kalsted's face with a damp cloth and pushing at his eyelids to see if he was alive, Annan concluded that he was dead. The coroner's physician subsequently confirmed that Kalsted died almost instantly, when the bullet passed through his heart. Fearing that neighbors had heard the shot, Annan put on a jazz recording of a song called "Hula Lou." Some newspapers claimed that she played the record over and over and danced around the apartment, while a dying Kalsted bled out on her bedroom floor. She finally called her husband at work. When he arrived home, he was the one who finally called the police.

== The trial ==
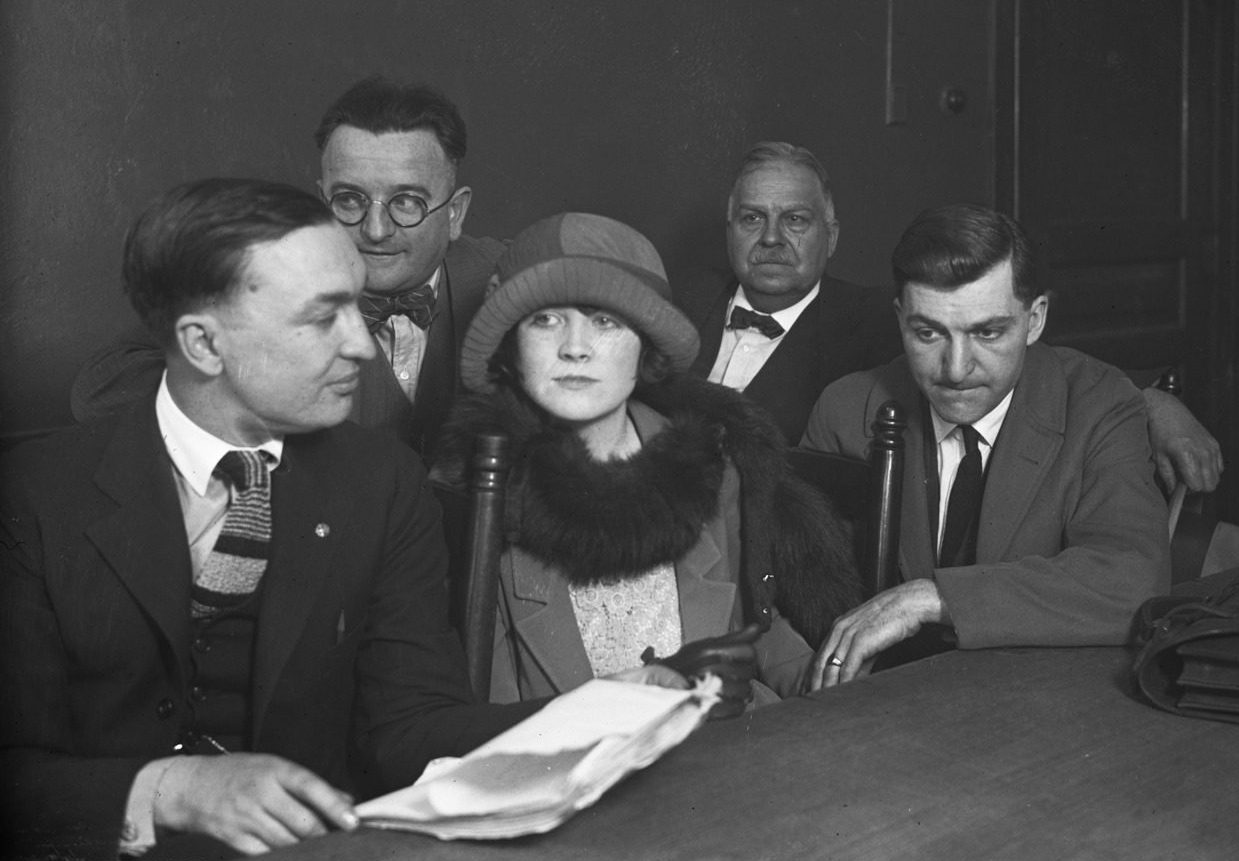
Annan, with her attorney William Scott Stewart (left) and husband (right), c. April 1924

In the days following her arrest, Annan repeated her statement that she got hold of the gun just before Kalsted grabbed it. At her trial, probably following direct advice or at least insinuation from her attorneys, she reverted to her claim that she hardly knew Kalsted, who wheedled his way into her apartment and then tried to rape her. Her lawyers argued that Kalsted was reaching toward her when she pulled the trigger in self-defense, which explained why the bullet traveled laterally through his torso. Prosecutors claimed that Annan shot Kalsted in a rage because he threatened to leave her. The trial ended with an acquittal on May 25, 1925. 24 hours later, she announced, "I am not going to waste the rest of my life with [Albert]—he’s too slow." She divorced him in 1926 on the charge that he had deserted her.

== Later life ==
In 1927, after her divorce from Annan was finalized, she married Edward Harlib, a boxer. Just three months later she claimed that he had been cruel to her and filed for divorce. In the divorce settlement, Harlib paid her $5,000 (equivalent to $93,000 in 2026 dollars).

== Death ==
Annan died of tuberculosis at age 28 at the Chicago Fresh Air Sanatorium, where she was staying under the name Beulah Stephens, in 1928, four years after her acquittal. She was returned to her home state for burial in Mount Pleasant Cumberland Presbyterian Church Cemetery, Daviess County, Kentucky. Her grave marker incorrectly notes her death as a year earlier, stating it to be March 10, 1927.
