= Vasser =

Vasser is surname, an altered form of French Levasseur or Vasseur.

Notable people with the surname include:

- Daniel "Dan" Vasser, a fictional character on the American TV drama Journeyman
- Jimmy Vasser (born 1965), American racing driver
- Katie Vasser, a fictional character on Journeyman

== See also ==
- Wasser (disambiguation)
- Vassar (disambiguation)
