= Bourbonnais, Illinois =

Bourbonnais
- Village
- Seal
- Motto: "Village of Friendship"
- Location of Bourbonnais in Illinois

- Location of Illinois in the United States
- Coordinates: 41°10′15″N 87°52′24″W
- Country: United States
- State: Illinois
- County: Kankakee
- Established: 1875
- Named for: François Bourbonnais

Government
  - Type: Council–Administrator
  - Mayor: Jeff Keast

Area
  - Total: 9.31 sq mi (24.12 km^{2})
  - Land: 9.31 sq mi (24.12 km^{2})
  - Water: 0 sq mi (0.00 km^{2})
- Elevation: 696 ft (212 m)

Population (2020)
  - Total: 18,164
  - Estimate (2025): 17,658
  - Density: 1,950.6/sq mi (753.15/km^{2})
- Time zone: UTC-6 (CST)
  - Summer (DST): UTC-5 (CDT)
- ZIP code: 60914
- Area codes: 815 and 779
- FIPS code: 17-07471
- GNIS feature ID: 2398154
- Website: www.villageofbourbonnais.com

Bourbonnais (/bərbəˈneɪ, bərˈboʊnəs/ bər-bə-NAY ,bər-BOH-nəs) is a village in Kankakee County, Illinois, United States. The population was 18,164 at the 2020 census.

== History ==
The village is named for François Jace Bourbonnais père, a fur trapper, hunter and agent of the American Fur Company, who had married a Native American woman and arrived in the area near the fork of two major Indian trails and the Kankakee River circa 1830. John Jacob Astor had founded the company in 1808, and when the United States banned foreign (i.e. British and Canadian) companies (such as the Hudson's Bay Company) from competing in the country after the War of 1812, it flourished. By 1830 it had a near monopoly of fur trading in the midwest, but the number of local trappable wild animals had declined.

In 1832, Noel Le Vasseur arrived as the Astor firm local fur trading agent, establishing a trading post in the area, and becoming the first permanent non-Native American settler. He married Watseka, niece of a Potawatomi chieftain, and after the Potawatomi were relocated to Iowa, recruited French-Canadiens to settle around his store. The Potawatomi were forced to move westward by a series of treaties culminating in the Treaty of Tippecanoe, which Congress ratified in 1833. The treaty reserved two sections for Potawanomi chief Me-she-ke-te-no, and one section each for Catish (Mrs. Bourbonnais Sr.) and Manteno (daughter of Francois Bourbonnais Jr.). LeVasseur received considerable land through a series of shrewd trades, and eventually divorced Watseka and married a Canadian woman named Ruth. After establishment of the new Catholic diocese of Chicago, missionary Fr. Stephen Badin briefly settled in Bourbonnais Grove in 1846, before retiring further south.

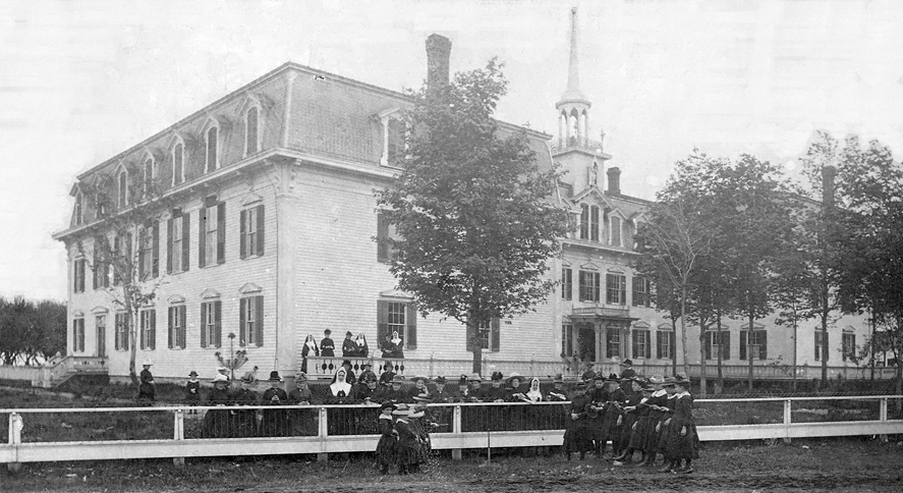
Notre-Dame Convent and Virgin Mary Elementary School 1883

In 1853, the Illinois legislature split Iroquois County, and Bourbonnais Grove became part of new Kankakee County. Because the Illinois Central Railroad ran through Kankakee, founded in 1854, it became the county seat, with Bourbonnais Grove as one of several townships. In 1858, residents built the Maternity of the Blessed Virgin Mary Church, and soon nuns of the Congregation of Notre Dame arrived from Canada to teach and provide nursing care. Two years later they founded Notre Dame Academy. In 1865 clerics of St. Viator founded St. Viator College for boys.

After a referendum in 1875, the settlement incorporated as the Village of Bourbonnais, with George R. LeTourneau as its first mayor, and trustees Francois Sequin, Joseph Legris, Alexis Gosselin, P.L. Monast, Alex LaMontagne, Joseph Goulet, Jacob Thyfault and Len Bessette. LeVasseur died, aged 80, four years later. LeTourneau also became mayor and sheriff of Kankakee as well as state senator; his home (begun in 1837 and with renovations completed in 1866) eventually became headquarters of the local historical society, which is also restoring the garden and nearby arboretum. After enrollment declines in the early 20th century, in 1940, the Catholic institutions were bought out by what became Olivet Nazarene University, since the Protestant school in nearby Vermillion County had burned down the previous year.

The original French pronunciation of Bourbonnais came to be Anglicized over time to /bərˈboʊnɪs/ bər-BOH-nis. In 1974, a state representative from Bourbonnais introduced a resolution "correcting" the pronunciation of the town's name to /bɜːrbəˈneɪ/ bur-bə-NAY, closer to the French. In 1976, for the U.S. Bicentennial, the Village Board passed a resolution making "ber-buh-NAY" the official pronunciation.

In 1999, the town was the site of a major train wreck, the Bourbonnais train accident.

Bourbonnais was home of the summertime training camp of the Chicago Bears professional football team from 2002 to 2019. In 2020, the team relocated their training camp to their headquarters at Halas Hall in Lake Forest, Illinois after major renovations of the building complex.

== Geography ==
According to the 2021 census gazetteer files, Bourbonnais has a total area of 9.31 square miles (24.11 km^{2}), all land.

== Demographics ==
Historical population
Census	Pop.	Note	%±
1900	595		—
1910	611		2.7%
1920	620		1.5%
1930	685		10.5%
1940	771		12.6%
1950	1,598		107.3%
1960	3,336		108.8%
1970	5,909		77.1%
1980	13,280		124.7%
1990	13,934		4.9%
2000	15,256		9.5%
2010	18,631		22.1%
2020	18,164		−2.5%
2025 (est.)	17,658		−2.8%
US Decennial Census

=== Racial and ethnic composition ===
Bourbonnais village, Illinois – Racial and ethnic composition Note: the US Census treats Hispanic/Latino as an ethnic category. This table excludes Latinos from the racial categories and assigns them to a separate category. Hispanics/Latinos may be of any race.
Race / Ethnicity (NH = Non-Hispanic)	Pop 2000	Pop 2010	Pop 2020	% 2000	% 2010	% 2020
White alone (NH)	13,640	15,614	14,002	89.41%	83.81%	77.09%
Black or African American alone (NH)	685	1,385	1,717	4.49%	7.43%	9.45%
Native American or Alaska Native alone (NH)	16	20	22	0.10%	0.11%	0.12%
Asian alone (NH)	365	351	421	2.39%	1.88%	2.32%
Pacific Islander alone (NH)	1	9	0	0.01%	0.05%	0.00%
Other race alone (NH)	20	26	63	0.13%	0.14%	0.35%
Mixed race or Multiracial (NH)	184	328	739	1.21%	1.76%	4.07%
Hispanic or Latino (any race)	345	898	1,200	2.26%	4.82%	6.61%
Total	15,256	18,631	18,164	100.00%	100.00%	100.00%

=== 2020 census ===
As of the 2020 census, Bourbonnais had a population of 18,164. The median age was 34.6 years. 22.3% of residents were under the age of 18 and 15.4% of residents were 65 years of age or older. For every 100 females there were 89.3 males, and for every 100 females age 18 and over there were 85.8 males age 18 and over.

97.4% of residents lived in urban areas, while 2.6% lived in rural areas.

There were 6,267 households in Bourbonnais, of which 33.2% had children under the age of 18 living in them. Of all households, 50.8% were married-couple households, 14.1% were households with a male householder and no spouse or partner present, and 28.5% were households with a female householder and no spouse or partner present. About 24.5% of all households were made up of individuals and 10.5% had someone living alone who was 65 years of age or older.

There were 6,642 housing units, of which 5.6% were vacant. The homeowner vacancy rate was 0.9% and the rental vacancy rate was 7.1%.

=== Demographic estimates ===
There were 4,272 families residing in the village. The population density was 1,950.60 inhabitants per square mile (753.13/km^{2}). Housing units averaged a density of 713.27 per square mile (275.40/km^{2}).

33.11% of households were non-families. The average household size was 3.30 and the average family size was 2.65.

The village's age distribution consisted of 20.6% from 18 to 24, 21.5% from 25 to 44, and 24.5% from 45 to 64.

=== Income and poverty ===
The median income for a household in the village was $76,920, and the median income for a family was $95,783. Males had a median income of $51,796 versus $31,570 for females. The per capita income for the village was $30,972. About 6.5% of families and 7.1% of the population were below the poverty line, including 7.6% of those under age 18 and 7.2% of those age 65 or over.

== Sports ==
The Chicago Bears of the National Football League held their annual summer training camp at Olivet Nazarene University in Bourbonnais from 2002 through 2019.

== Education ==
Bourbonnais Elementary School District 53 (BESD53) serves local students from kindergarten to middle school.

Bourbonnais shares a high school, Bradley-Bourbonnais Community High School (BBCHS), with Bradley, Illinois. The Kankakee Area Career Center (KACC) serves local area high school students as a vocational and technical education institution. Bourbonnais is served by three private high schools: Bishop McNamara Catholic School (Catholic), Grace Christian Academy (non-denominational), and Kankakee Trinity Academy (inter-denominational).The village is home to Olivet Nazarene University (ONU), on the site of the old St. Viator College campus.

== Infrastructure ==
=== Transportation ===
River Valley Metro provides bus service on multiple routes connecting Bourbonnais to destinations in the Kankakee area.

== Notable people ==
- Anthony Markanich, 1999: A soccer player who plays for Minnesota United in the Major League Soccer.
- Nick Markanich, 1999: A soccer player who plays for Charleston Battery in the USL Championship.
- Joseph Viateur "Léo" Dandurand, born 1889 He was the owner and coach of the Montreal Canadiens ice hockey team in the National Hockey League (NHL). He also was an owner of race tracks and of the Montreal Alouettes football team in the league that evolved into the Canadian Football League.
- Sam Yagan, born 1977 an American Internet entrepreneur best known as the co-founder of OkCupid. In 2013, he was named to TIME Magazine's '100 Most Influential People in the World' list. He is the vice-chairman of the e-dating site Match.com.
- Abbie Marie Boudreau, Born 1978 an American ABC television news correspondent. She joined ABC in November 2010. She was formerly with CNN. She has received seven regional Emmys for investigative reporting, writing and enterprise journalism. She also received regional Edward R. Murrow awards in both 2006 and 2007.
- Colin Holderman, 1995: a baseball player who plays for the Cleveland Guardians in Major League Baseball.
