= Vasseur =

Vasseur is a French surname, a shortened form of "vavasour", a title in feudal law. Vassar is its anglicized version. Notable people with the Vasseur surname include:

- Adolphe Bazaine-Vasseur (1809–1893), French railway engineer
- Alain Vasseur (born 1948), French cyclist
- Alexis Vasseur, French-American mathematician
- Cédric Vasseur (born 1970), French cyclist, son of Alain
- Flore Vasseur (born 1973), French filmmaker, novelist, journalist and entrepreneur
- Frédéric Vasseur (born 1968), French motor sport engineer
- Gaston Vasseur (1904–1971), French linguist
- Isabelle Vasseur (born 1959), member of the National Assembly of France
- Jean-Luc Vasseur (born 1969), French football manager
- Leo Vasseur, Canadian politician
- Léon Vasseur (1844–1917), French composer, organist and conductor
- Louis Vasseur (1885–1968), French athlete
- Noel Le Vasseur (1798–1879), trader and merchant from Canada
- Paul Vasseur (1884–1971), French swimmer and water polo player
- Peter Le Vasseur (born 1938), artist from Guernsey
- Philippe Vasseur (born 1943), French politician

== See also ==
- Levasseur (surname)
