= Levasseur (surname) =

Levasseur is a French surname. Notable people with the surname include:

- André-Nicolas or Auguste Levasseur, French author and secretary for Marquis de Lafayette
- Grégory Levasseur (born 1979), French filmmaker
- Jon Levasseur, former member of Canadian death metal band Cryptopsy
- Joseph Le Vasseur Borgia (1773–1839), a lawyer, newspaper owner and political figure in Lower Canada
- Louis Levasseur (1671–1748), scrivener
- Nickolas Levasseur, Democratic member of the New Hampshire House of Representatives
- Nicolas Levasseur (1791–1871), French bass, particularly associated with Rossini roles
- Noel Le Vasseur (1798–1879), trader and merchant born in St. Michel d`Yamaska, Canada
- Olivier Levasseur (1680 or 1690–1730), pirate
- Pierre Levasseur (aircraft builder) (1890–1941), French aircraft builder
- Pierre Levasseur, colonial head of French Sénégal from 1807 to 1809
- Pierre Émile Levasseur (1828–1911), French economist and son of cartographer Victor Levasseur
- Raymond Luc Levasseur, American Marxist militant
- René Levasseur (1747–1834) (fr), French deputy of the National Convention
- Richard LeVasseur, American politician
- Robert Levasseur (management scholar), professor at Walden University
- Robert Levasseur (rugby union) (1898–1974), French rugby union player
- Rosalie Levasseur or Le Vasseur (1749–1826), French soprano
- Thérèse Levasseur (1721–1801), wife of French philosopher Jean-Jacques Rousseau
- Victor Levasseur (1772–1809), French general under Napoleon Bonaparte
- Victor Levasseur (cartographer) (1800–1870), French cartographer

== Fictional characters ==
- Pierre Levasseur, protagonist of the 2006 French film The Valet

== See also ==
- Levasseur (disambiguation)
- Vasseur (surname)
