= Wasser =

Wasser means "Water" in German. It may refer to:

== People ==
- Anna Waser (1678–1714), Swiss painter
- Annemarie Waser (born 1940), Swiss alpine skier
- Ed Wasser (born 1964), actor
- Edgar Wasser (born 1990), German musician
- Joan Wasser (born 1970), American musician, singer-songwriter and producer
- Julian Wasser (1933–2023), American photographer
- Laura Wasser (born 1968), attorney
- Markus Wasser (born 1968), bobsledder
- Thierry Wasser (born 1961), Swiss perfumer

== Places ==
- Wasser, Germany, a village

== Other uses ==
- Wasser- und Schifffahrtsamt, a regional German agency responsible for the administration of federal navigable waters
- Wasser- und Zugvogelreservate, several bird reserves in Switzerland
- Wasser im Wind, album by keyboardist Hans-Joachim Roedelius

== See also ==
- Vasser
- Waser
- Wassermann (disambiguation)
