= Hubbard Street =

Street in Chicago

- Gurdon S. Hubbard Street; 430 North
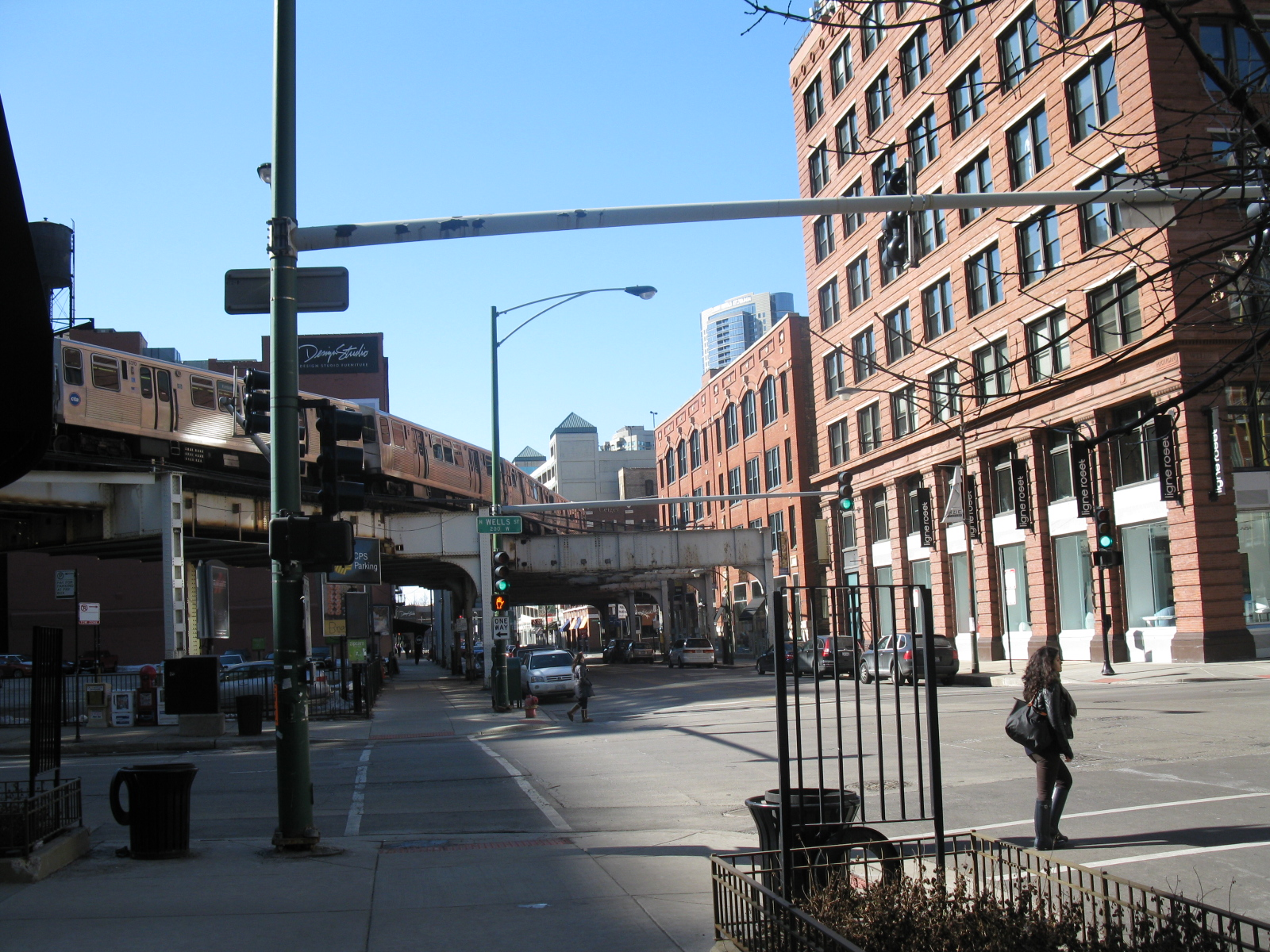
- Hubbard Street at Wells Street, located east of the "L" tracks
- Interactive map of Hubbard Street
- Coordinates: 41.89007°N 87.62801°W
- West end: Lavergne Avenue (5000 W)
- East end: Michigan Avenue (100 E)

Hubbard Street is a street in Chicago, Illinois named for early settler Gurdon Saltonstall Hubbard. Hubbard Street has three distinct sections. The first, east of the Chicago River, runs from Kingsbury Street to Michigan Avenue. The second, longer section runs from Des Plaines Street west to Campbell Avenue (2500 W) The third and shortest section is a three-block stretch from Kilpatrick Avenue (4700 W) to Lavergne Avenue (5000 W) where it ends at the Hubbard Playlot Park. Notable buildings on this street include Courthouse Place at 54 W. Hubbard.

== Hubbard's Cave ==
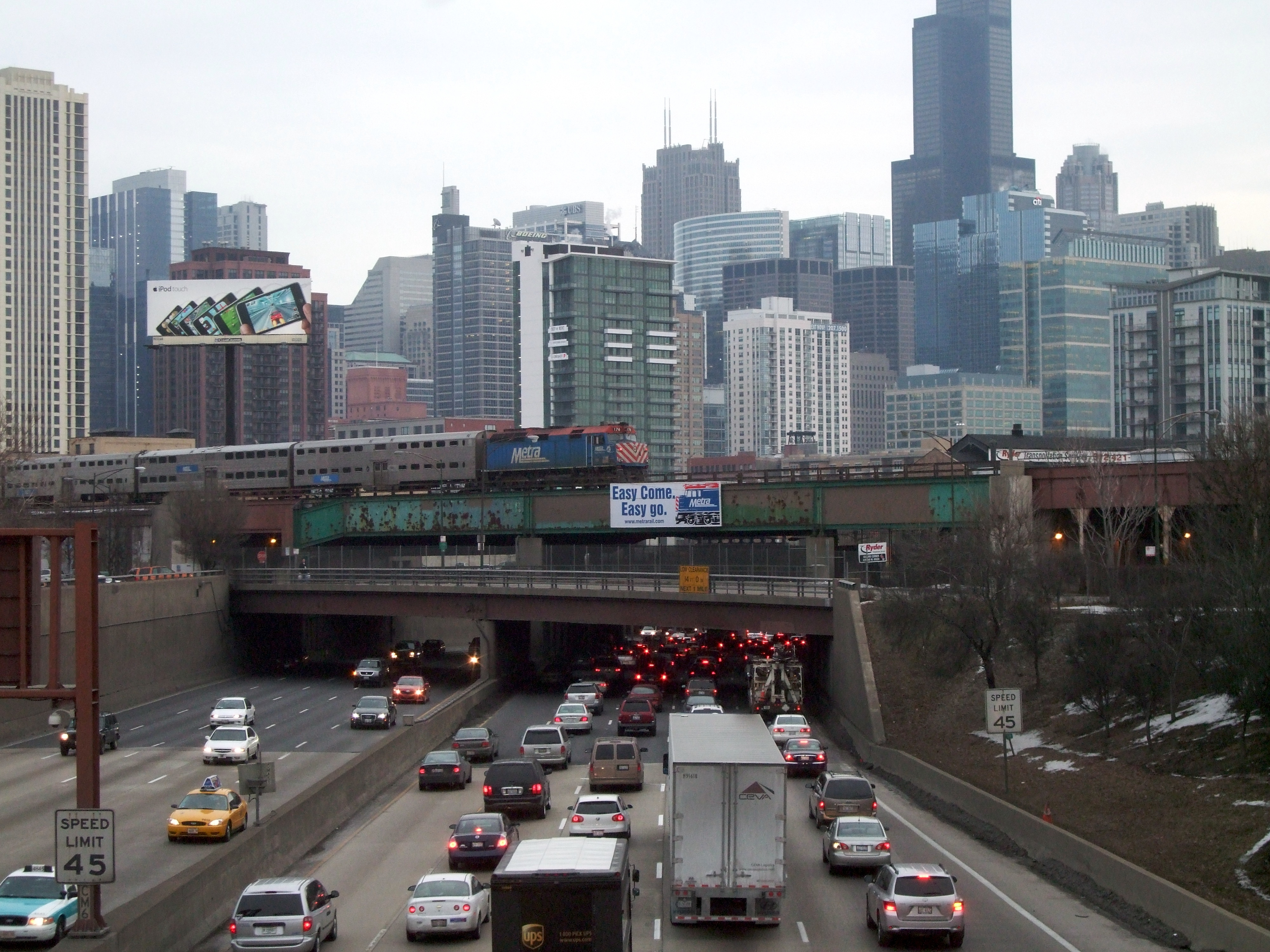
Hubbard's Cave and the Chicago skyline, in 2010. In a view looking southeast, Hubbard Street is seen crossing over the Kennedy Expressway, with the Metra tracks behind and above it.

Where Hubbard Street crosses over the Kennedy Expressway, there is a long underpass popularly known as Hubbard's Cave. The underpass is about a quarter of a mile in length, and actually extends from Hubbard Street to Wayman Street. This tunnel-like section of the expressway was very dark to drive through until lights were added in 1962.

== Murals ==
Running along the south side of Hubbard Street, from Ogden Avenue to Des Plaines Street, is the artwork of the Hubbard Street Mural Project. The murals are painted on the walls of the Metra tracks embankment. Originally begun in the 1970s, the murals have been in the process of restoration or replacement as the Union Pacific Railroad has been making repairs to the concrete structure.

== Streetscape ==
The Merchandise Mart stands one block to the south of Hubbard Street between Franklin Street and Orleans Street, and several buildings on the National Register of Historic Places stand on the street including Courthouse Place.

== Transit ==
At the intersection of Hubbard and N Artesian Avenue is the Western Avenue station for Metra's Milwaukee District North (MD-N), Milwaukee District West (MD-W), and North Central Service (NCS) lines. Metra does not currently maintain an agent at this station and the waiting room is open from 4:00 a.m. to 7:00 p.m. Located nearby are the 33 Magnificent Mile Express, 49 Western, and 65 Grand buses for the Chicago Transit Authority.

There is also access to the Merchandise Mart Brown and Purple Line 'L' station on Wells Street just south of Hubbard.

== Hubbard Playlot Park ==
Hubbard Park is one of many playgrounds established by the City of Chicago after World War II. By 1950, the Bureau of Parks and Recreation had developed this playlot on property owned by the Board of Education in the Austin community. Several years later, the bureau added a basketball court to the original sandbox, spraypool, and playground equipment. The property was transferred to the Chicago Park District in 1959. The park district installed a new soft surface playground in 1989, and purchased the property from the Board of Education the following year.

== In popular culture ==
- The Hubbard Street Dance Chicago company is named for this street.
- The Billy Goat Tavern, made famous in a Saturday Night Live skit, is located on Hubbard Street at the intersection with lower Michigan Avenue.
- Ben Hecht and Charles MacArthur's hit play The Front Page was set in the Chicago Criminal Courts Building on 54 West Hubbard Street.

== Sources ==
- Hayner, Don & McNamee, Tom (1988). Streetwise Chicago. Chicago: Loyola University Press. ISBN 0-8294-0596-8.
