= Levasseur =

Levasseur or leVasseur or Le Vasseur or variant may refer to:

== People ==
- Levasseur (surname)

== Places ==
- Levasseur Inlet, Nunavut, Canada
- René-Levasseur Island, Quebec, Canada
- 6170 Levasseur, asteroid discovered in 1981

== Other uses ==
- Pierre Levasseur (aircraft builder), French aircraft manufacturer

== See also ==
- Vasseur (surname)
