= Elizabeth Edwards (politician) =

American politician (born 1988)

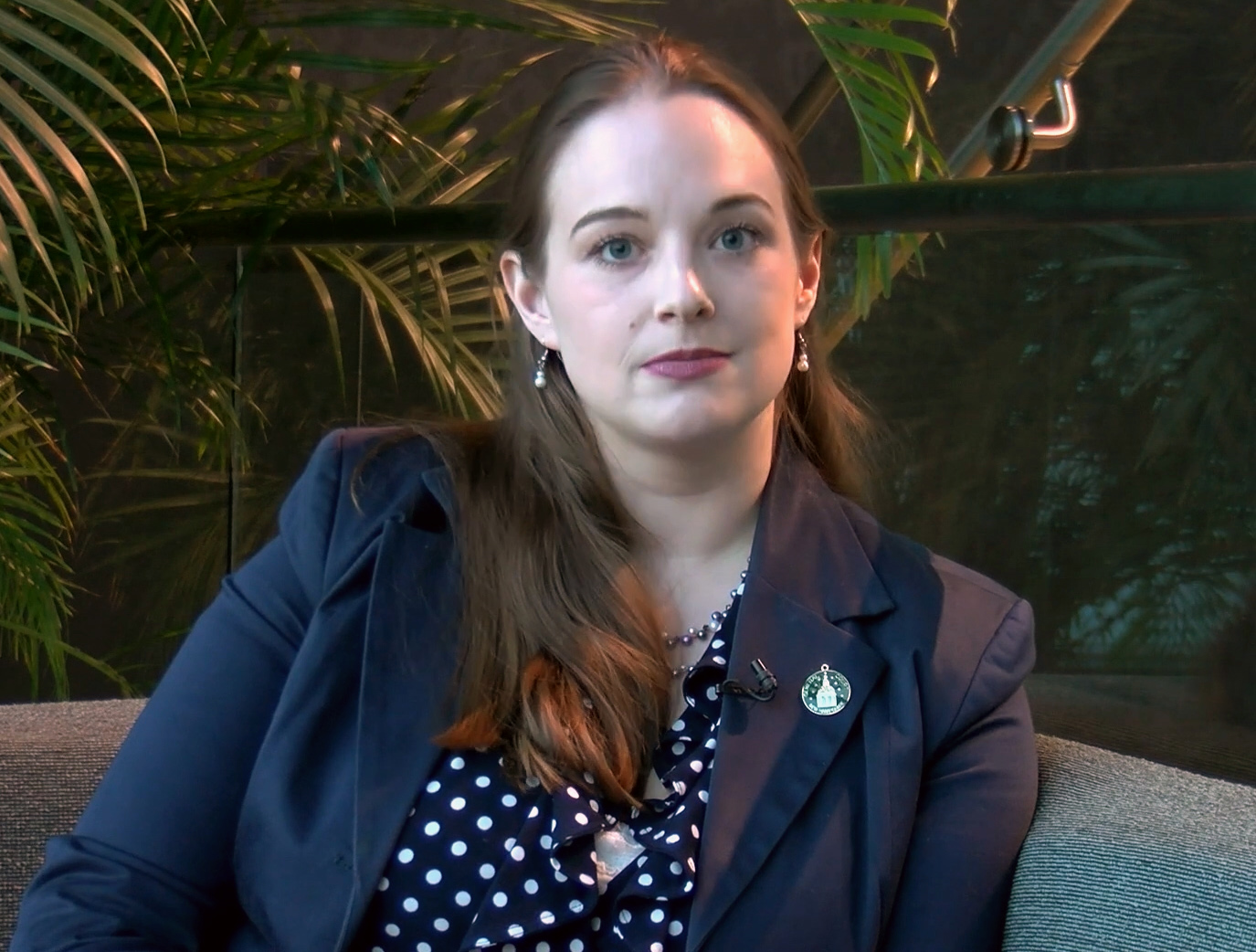
- Elizabeth Edwards in 2019

Member of the New Hampshire House of Representatives from the Hillsborough 11th district
- In office December 3, 2014 – December 5, 2018
- Preceded by: Nickolas Levasseur
- Succeeded by: Donald Bouchard

Personal details
- Born: 1988 (age 37–38)
- Party: Democratic
- Spouse: Caitlin Edwards-Appell
- Profession: Politician

Elizabeth Edwards (born 1988) is an American politician and former Democratic member of the New Hampshire House of Representatives who represented the Hillsborough 11th district from 2014 to 2018.

== Political activity ==
Although a member of the Democratic Party, Edwards was initially endorsed by the libertarian New Hampshire Liberty Alliance, and was "closely associated" with the Free State Project (FSP). She since distanced herself from the FSP, and was not endorsed by the NHLA when she ran for re-election in 2016.

In January 2016, Edwards introduced a bill to decriminalize prostitution in New Hampshire between consenting adults. The bill was opposed by Republican house majority leader Richard Hinch, who commented that "society is just not ready for that". Edwards is also an advocate of drug policy reform. With assistance from other FSP members, Edwards helped pass a bill to give drug users immunity from prosecution when they report a drug-related medical emergency.

== Personal life ==
Her father, Jess Edwards, has served in the House since 2016 as a Republican. He credits her example with leading him to run for office, although they differ on many issues and often voted on different sides of issues during the time they served together.
