= Courthouse Place =

- Cook County Criminal Court Building
- U.S. National Register of Historic Places
- Chicago Landmark
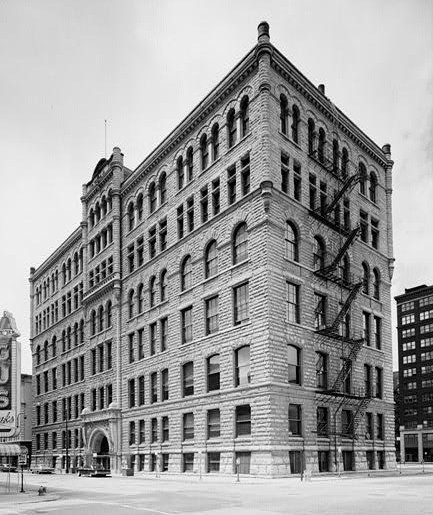
- The south (front) and east side of the building. 1964 photograph from the Historic American Buildings Survey. The now demolished jail cell blocks would have been to the right in this picture.
- Location: 54 West Hubbard Street; Chicago, Illinois
- Coordinates: 41°53′24.59″N 87°37′48.6″W
- Built: 1893
- Architect: Otto H. Matz
- Architectural style: Romanesque
- NRHP reference No.: 84000281

Significant dates
- Added to NRHP: November 13, 1984
- Designated CHICL: June 9, 1993

Courthouse Place, also known as the former Cook County Criminal Court Building, is a Richardsonian Romanesque-style building at 54 West Hubbard Street in the Near North Side of Chicago. Now a commercial office building, it originally served as a noted courthouse. Designed by architect Otto H. Matz and completed in 1892 or 1893, it replaced and reused material from the earlier 1874 criminal courthouse at this site (the location of the trial and hangings related to the Haymarket Affair). The complex included, in addition to the successive courthouses, the cell blocks of the Cook County Jail, and a hanging gallows for prisoners sentenced to death. During the 1920s the attached jail (which was behind the courthouse but has since been demolished) housed almost twice its intended capacity of 1,200 inmates, and a shortage of court rooms led to a backlog of cases.

For its first 35 years, the present Courthouse Place building housed the Cook County Criminal Courts and was the site of many legendary trials, including Adolph Luetgert, Leopold and Loeb, the Black Sox Scandal, and the jazz age trials that formed the basis of the play and musical Chicago. The 1928 play The Front Page was written by newspaper reporters Ben Hecht and Charles MacArthur based on the day-to-day events here. Other authors of Chicago's 1920s literary renaissance who were employed in the fourth floor pressroom include Carl Sandburg, Sherwood Anderson, and Vincent Starrett. It was added to the National Register of Historic Places (NRHP) on November 13, 1984 with ID 8400028, and was labelled as significant in the areas of law, politics/government, and architecture, in the last quarter of the 1800s and the first quarter of the 1900s, especially 1892. It was designated a Chicago Landmark on June 9, 1993.

In 1929, the Criminal Courts left the 54 West Hubbard Street location as did the Cook County Jail, and the building was then occupied by the Chicago Board of Health and other city agencies. After poor alterations and years of neglect, the building was acquired by a private developer, Friedman Properties, Ltd in 1985. The property was restored and refurbished as "Courthouse Place," an office development later expanded to include the restoration of other surrounding historic buildings.

North Market Hall was previously erected at the site in 1851 but burned in the Great Chicago Fire.

== Gallery ==
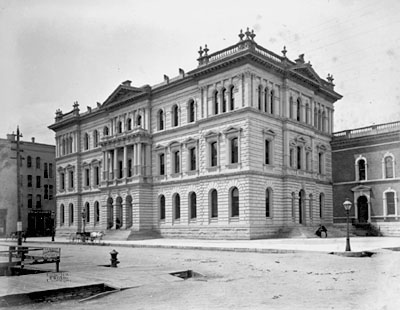
The post-Great Chicago Fire Cook County Criminal Courthouse (1874 - 1892), which was replaced by the present structure at the same site. The then existing jail can be seen, in part, at right

Architectural sketch of the building by its architect, Otto H. Matz, published in The Inland Architect and News Record in March 1893.

== See also ==
- Chicago Landmark
