= Rouchi =

- Rouchy
- Pronunciation: [ʁuʃi]
- Native to: France, Belgium
- Region: Walloon Flanders; French Hainaut; Cambrésis; Tournaisis
- Ethnicity: Picards
- Native speakers: Unknown
- Language family: Indo-European: Italic; Latino-Faliscan; Latin; Romance; Italo-Western; Western Romance; Gallo-Iberian; Gallo-Romance; Gallo-Rhaetian?; Arpitan–Oïl; Oïl; Picard; Rouchi
- Dialects: Kimberlot; Gommergnion; Tournaisien; Pecquois
- Writing system: Latin

Language codes
- ISO 639-3: –
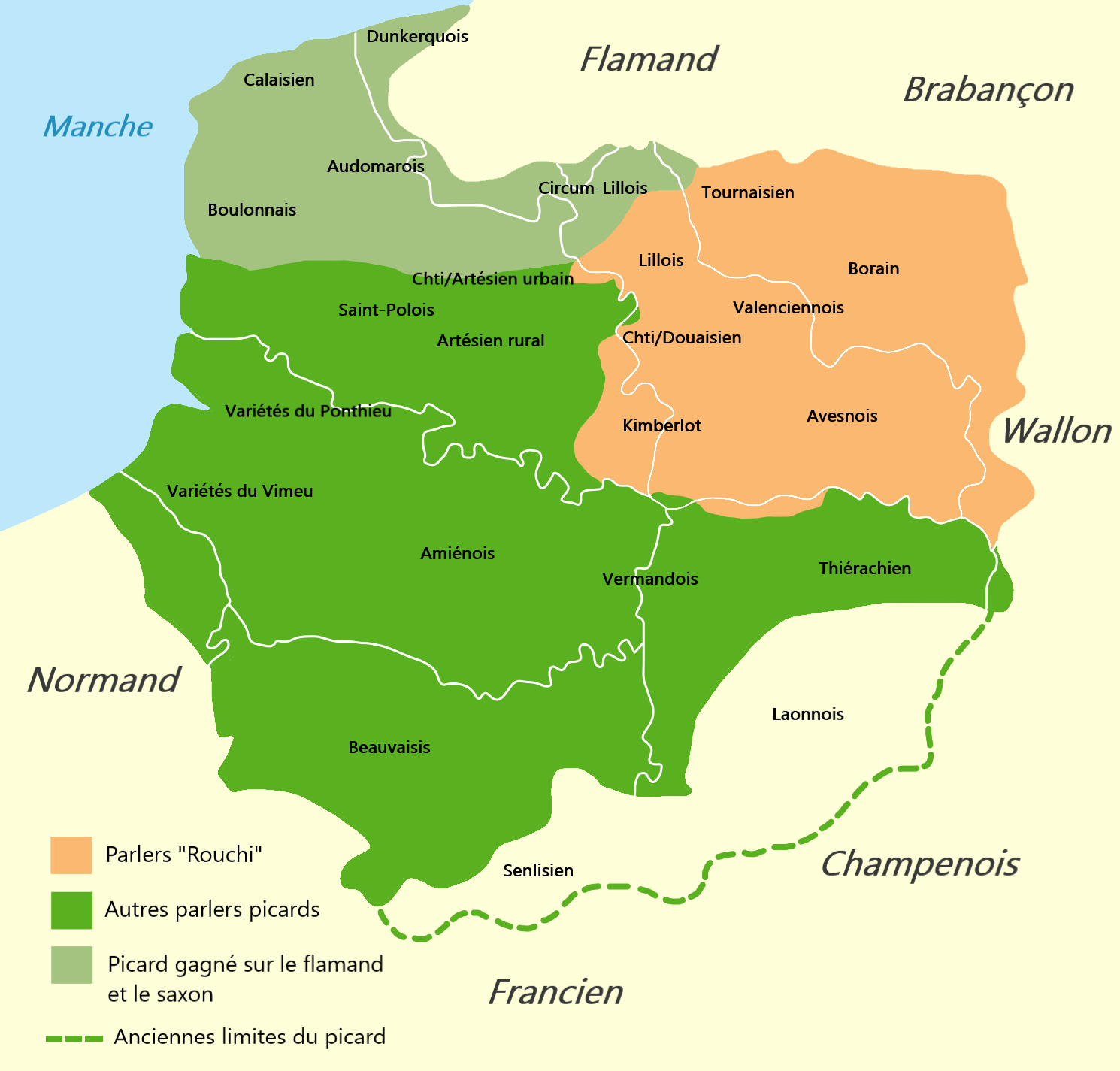
- Spread of the Rouchi dialect in orange.
- Extract of a Rouchi poem from the Denain L’aut’ jour, j’tos au bistrot pou y déquinte eun’ pinte Avec mes comarat’s Anatole et Lucas. Mais i minquot Gaston ; Li, ch’est vraimint eun cas : Il est toudis in r’tard… Tout d’eun cop, v’là qu’i rinte. [The other day, I was at the tavern, drinking a pint, With my good mates Anatole and Lucas. But Gaston was nowhere to be found; That fellow truly is a case: He's always running late... Then all at once, there he comes walking in.] — Jean-Luc Menet, L’absinthe

Rouchi or Rouchy is a local variety of Picard spoken in the Rouchi country ("Pays Rouchi") which includes the Valenciennois, as well as Saint-Amand, Lille, Tournai, Cambrai and Douai.

This dialect is attested in documents dating back to the Middle-Ages: Serventois et sottes chansons (13th century), Chronique de Flandres (14th century) although the most popular of them remain Mirouer des simples ames anienties et qui seulement demourent en vouloir et desir d'amour (Mirror of simple and shattered souls), written by Marguerite Porete in 1290.

== Varieties ==
Rouchi is not an homogeneous dialect and present many variants:

- Kimberlot or Camberlot, spoken in the Cambresis. It is close to Southern Picard;
- Gommergnion, spoken in Gommegnies;
- Tournaisien, spoken in the Tournaisis;
- Pecquois which is a transition between the Rouchi and Lille-area dialects. It is close to the varieties spoken in Tournai, Roubaix and Mouscron;

== Phonology ==
Rouchi is separated from other Picard dialects by the shift from tch to k (e.g. tchien becomes kien), and by the transformation of w into o in imperfect tense endings (e.g. avoér becomes avos). Within words, the French diphthong oy becomes o in Rouchi - a single vowel (e.g. loyer becomes loïer).

In Rouchi when the letter ‘c’ is pronounced as the letter ’k’, it appears in the Latin form, whereas in French it has undergone palatalisation to ‘ch’.

| English | Latin | Rouchi | French |
|---|---|---|---|
| to sing | cantare | canter | chanter |
| piece | cantellus | cantiau | chanteau |
| coal | carbo | carbon | charbon |
| cat | catus | cat | chat |
| chair | cathedra | cayère | chaise |
| chair | cathedra | cadot | chaise |
| cow | vacca | vaque | vache |

This k may also have been retained from Frankish (klinka, clinque, clenche).
