= Picard language =

Gallo-Romance language

Picard
- picard
- Pronunciation: [pikaʁ]
- Native to: France, Belgium
- Region: Picardy
- Ethnicity: Picards
- Native speakers: 700,000 (2011)
- Language family: Indo-European: Italic; Latino-Faliscan; Latin; Romance; Italo-Western; Western Romance; Gallo-Iberian; Gallo-Romance; Gallo-Rhaetian?; Arpitan–Oïl; Oïl; Picard
- Early forms: Old Latin: Vulgar Latin; Proto-Romance; Old Gallo-Romance; Old French
- Dialects: Amiénois; Audomarois; Beauvaisis; Borain; Chtimi; Rouchi; Rural Artois; Saint-Polois; Thiérache; Vermandois; Vimeu–Ponthieu; Coastal varieties Lille-area varieties
- Writing system: Latin

Official status
- Recognised minority language in: French Community of Belgium

Language codes
- ISO 639-3: pcd
- Glottolog: pica1241
- ELP: Picard
- Linguasphere: 51-AAA-he
- The geographical spread of Picard.

- Picard is classified as Severely Endangered by the UNESCO Atlas of the World's Languages in Danger.

Picard (/ˈpɪkɑːrd/ PIK-ard, also US: /pɪˈkɑːrd, ˈpɪkərd/ pih-KARD, PIK-ərd; French: [pikaʁ]) also known as 'Roman Flemish' or 'Romane flamande' is a langue d'oïl of the Romance language family spoken in the northernmost region of France and parts of Hainaut province in Belgium. Administratively, this area is divided between the French Hauts-de-France region and the Belgian Wallonia along the border between both countries due to its traditional core being the districts of Tournai and Mons (Walloon Picardy).

The language is referred to by different names, as residents of Picardy call it simply Picard, but in the more populated region of Nord-Pas-de-Calais it is typically called Ch'ti or Ch'timi (sometimes written as Chti or Chtimi). This is the area that makes up Romance Flanders, around the metropolis of Lille and Douai, and northeast Artois around Béthune and Lens. Picard is also named Rouchi around Valenciennes, Roubaignot around Roubaix.

In 1998, Picard native speakers amounted to 700,000 individuals, the vast majority of whom were elderly people (aged 65 and over). Since its daily use had drastically declined, Picard was declared by the United Nations Educational, Scientific, and Cultural Organisation (UNESCO) a "severely endangered language". However, as of 2023, the Picard language was listed as "vulnerable" by UNESCO.

== Origin of the word ch'ti ==
The word ch'ti, chtimi or ch'timi to designate the Picard language was invented during the First World War by Poilus from non-Picard speaking areas to refer to their brothers in arms from Picardy and Nord-Pas-de-Calais. It is an onomatopoeia created based on the frequent use of the /ʃ/ (ch-) phoneme and of the /ʃti/ (chti) sound in Picard: "ch'ti" means the one, as in the sentence "ch'est chti qui a fait cha" (he is the one who has done that), for instance.

== Recognition ==
Belgium's French Community gave full official recognition to Picard as a regional language along with Walloon, Gaumais (Lorraine), Champenois (Champagne) and Lorraine German in its 1990 decree. The French government has not followed suit and has not recognized Picard as an official regional language (in line with its policy of linguistic unity, which allows for only one official language in France, as per the French Constitution), but some reports have recognized Picard as a language distinct from French.

A 1999 report by Bernard Cerquiglini, the director of the Institut national de la langue française (National Institute of the French Language) stated:

The gap has continued to widen between French and the varieties of langues d'oïl, which today we would call "French dialects"; Franc-comtois, Walloon, Picard, Norman, Gallo, Poitevin, Saintongeais, Bourguignon-morvandiau, Lorrain must be accepted among the regional languages of France; by placing them on the list [of French regional languages], they will be known from then on as langues d'oïl.

Even if it has no official status as a language in France, Picard, along with all the other languages spoken in France, benefits from actions led by the Culture Minister's General Delegation for the French language and the languages of France (la Délégation générale à la langue française et aux langues de France).

== Origins ==
Picard, like French, is one of the langues d'oïl and belongs to the Gallo-Roman family of languages. It consists of all the varieties used for writing (Latin: scriptae) in the north of France from before 1000 (in the south of France at that time the Occitan language was used). Often, the langues d'oïl are referred to simply as Old French. Picard is phonetically quite different from the North-central langues d'oïl, which evolved into modern French. Among the most notable traits, the evolution in Picard towards palatalization is less marked than in the central langues d'oïl in which it is particularly striking; /k/ or /ɡ/ before /j/, tonic /i/ and /e/, as well as in front of tonic /a/ and /ɔ/ (from earlier *au; the open /o/ of the French porte) in central Old French but not in Picard:

- Picard keval ~ Old French cheval (horse; pronounced in Old French [tʃəˈval] rather than the modern [ʃəˈval]), from *kabal (vulgar Latin caballus): retaining the original /k/ in Picard before tonic /a/ and /ɔ/.
- Picard gambe ~ Old French jambe (leg; pronounced in Old French [ˈdʒãmbə] rather than the modern [ʒɑ̃b] – [ʒ] is the ge sound in beige), from *gambe (vulgar Latin gamba): absence of palatalization of /ɡ/ in Picard before tonic /a/ and /ɔ/.
- Picard kief ~ Old French chef (leader), from *kaf (Latin caput): less palatalization of /k/ in Picard
- Picard cherf ~ Old French cerf (stag; pronounced [tʃerf] and [tserf] respectively), from *kerf (Latin cervus): simple palatalization in Picard, palatalization then fronting in Old French

The effects of palatalization can be summarised as this:

- /k/ and (tonic) /y/, /i/ or /e/: Picard /tʃ/ (written ch) ~ Old French /ts/ (written c)
- /k/ and /ɡ/ + tonic /a/ or /ɔ/: Picard /k/ and /ɡ/ ~ Old French /tʃ/ and /dʒ/.

There are striking differences, such as Picard cachier ('to hunt') ~ Old French chacier, which later took the modern French form of chasser. Because of the proximity of Paris to the northernmost regions of France, French (that is, the languages that were spoken in and around Paris) greatly influenced Picard and vice versa. The closeness between Picard and French causes the former to not always be recognised as a language in its own right, but rather a "distortion of French" as it is often viewed.

== Dialects ==
Despite being geographically and syntactically affiliated according to some linguists due to their inter-comprehensible morphosyntactic features, Picard in Picardy, Ch'timi and Rouchi still intrinsically maintain conspicuous discrepancies. Picard includes a variety of very closely related dialects. It is difficult to list them all accurately in the absence of specific studies on the dialectal variations, but these varieties can probably provisionally be distinguished: Amiénois, Vimeu-Ponthieu, Vermandois, Thiérache, Beauvaisis, "chtimi" (Bassin Minier, Lille), dialects in other regions near Lille (Roubaix, Tourcoing, Mouscron, Comines), "rouchi" (Valenciennois) and Tournaisis, Borain, Artésien rural, Boulonnais. The varieties are defined by specific phonetic, morphological and lexical traits and sometimes by a distinctive literary tradition.

The Ch'ti language was re-popularised by the 2008 French comedy film Welcome to the Sticks (French: Bienvenue chez les Ch'tis; French pronunciation: [bjɛ̃vny ʃe le ʃti]) which broke nearly every box office record in France and earned over $245,000,000 worldwide on an 11 million euro budget.

== Use ==
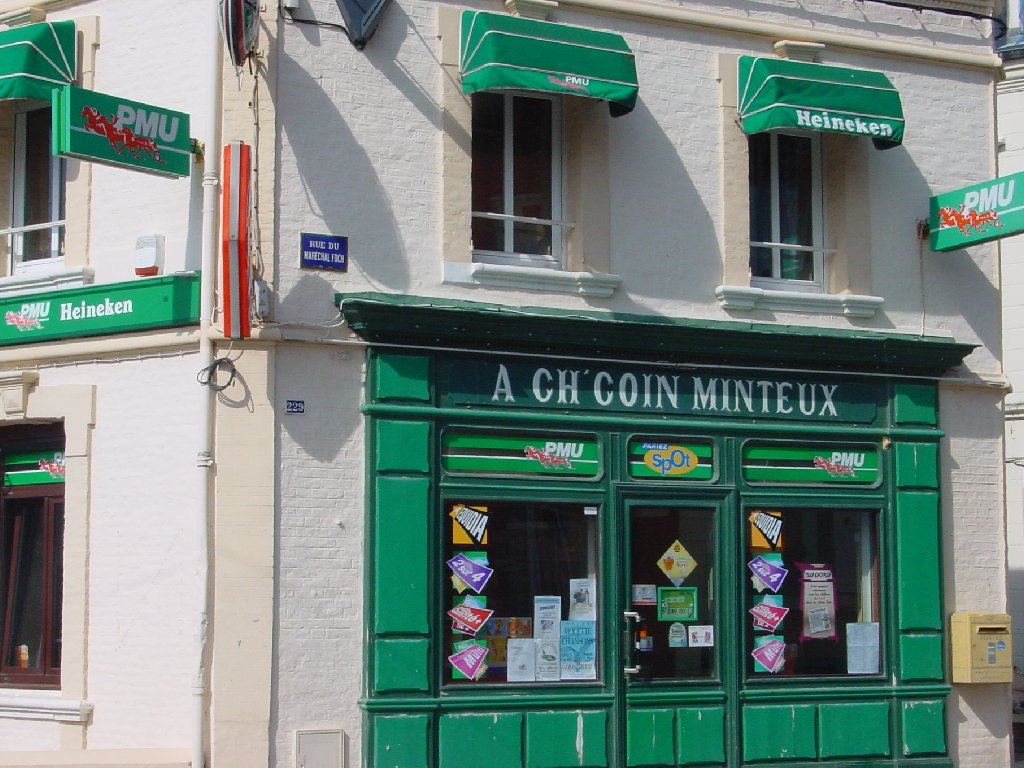
Picard language signage in Cayeux-sur-Mer

Picard is not taught in French schools (apart from a few one-off and isolated courses) and is generally only spoken among friends or family members. It has nevertheless been the object of scholarly research at universities in Lille and Amiens, as well as at Indiana University. Since people are now able to move around France more easily than in past centuries, the different varieties of Picard are converging and becoming more similar. In its daily use, Picard is tending to lose its distinctive features and may be confused with regional French. At the same time, even though most Northerners can understand Picard today, fewer and fewer are able to speak it, and people who speak Picard as their first language are increasingly rare, particularly under 50.

The 2008 film Welcome to the Sticks, starring comedian Dany Boon, deals with Ch'ti language and culture and the perceptions of the region by outsiders, and it was the highest-grossing French film of all time at the box office in France.

== Writing system ==
Today Picard is primarily a spoken language, but in the medieval period, there is a wealth of literary texts in Picard. However, Picard was not able to compete with French and was slowly reduced to the status of a regional language.

A more recent body of Picard literature, written during the last two centuries, also exists. Modern written Picard is generally a transcription of the spoken language. For that reason, words are often spelled in a variety of different ways (in the same way that English and French were before they were standardized).

One system of spelling for Picard words is similar to that of French. It is undoubtedly the easiest for French speakers to understand but can also contribute the stereotype that Picard is only a corruption of French rather than a language in its own right.

Various spelling methods have been proposed since the 1960s to offset the disadvantage and to give Picard a visual identity that is distinct from French. There is now a consensus, at least between universities, in favor of the written form known as Feller-Carton (based on the Walloon spelling system, which was developed by Jules Feller, and adapted for Picard by Professor Fernand Carton).

== Morphology ==
=== Verbs and tenses ===
The first person plural often appears in spoken Picard in the form of the neutral third person in; however, the written form prioritizes os (as in French, where on is used for nous). On the other hand, the spelling of conjugated verbs will depend on the pronunciation, which varies within the Picard domain. For instance southern Picard would read il étoait / étoét while northern Picard would read il étot. This is noted as variants in the following:

TO BE : ète (être)
Indicative							Subjunctive		Imperative	
	Present	Imperfect		Future	Conditional		Present			
		North	South		North	South		Variables		Variables
I	ej su	j'éto(s)	j'étoé / étoais	ej srai	ej séro(s)	ej sroé	qu'ej soéche	qu'ej fuche / seuche		
YOU	t'es	t'étos	t'étoés / étoais	tu sros	té séros	tu sroés	eq tu soéches	eq tu fuches / seuches	soéche	fus / fuche
HE	il est	i'étot	il étoét / étoait	i sro	i sérot	i sroét	qu'i soéche	qu'i fuche / seuche		
SHE	al est	al étot	al étoét / étoait	ale sro	ale sérot	ale sroét	qu'ale soéche	qu'ale fuche / seuche		
ONE	in est	in étot	in étoét / étoait	in sro	in sérot	in sroét	qu'in soéche	qu'in fuche / seuche		
WE	os sonmes	os étonmes	os étoinmes	os srons	os séronmes	os sroinmes	qu'os soéïonches	qu'os fuchonches / seuchonches / sonches	soéïons	fuchons
YOU	os ètes	os étotes	os étoétes	os srez	os sérotes	os sroétes	qu'os soéïèches	qu'os fuchèches / seuchèches	soéïez	fuchez
THEY	is sont	is étotte	is étoétte / étoaitte	is sront	is sérotte	is sroétte	qu'is soéchtte	qu'is fuchtte / seuchtte		

TO HAVE : avoèr (avoir)
Indicative							Subjunctive		Imperative	
	Present	Imperfect		Future	Conditional		Present			
		North	South		North	South		Variables		Variables
I	j'ai	j'ai	j'avo(s)	j'avoés / avoais	j'arai	j'érai	j'aros	j'éroé	eq j'euche	
YOU	t'as	t'os	t'avos	t'avoés	t'aras	t'éros	t'aros	t'éroés	eq t'euches	aïe
HE	i'a	il o	i'avot	il avoét	i'ara	il éro	i'arot	il éroét	qu'il euche	
SHE	al a	al o	al avot	al avoét	al ara	al éro	al arot	al éroét	qu'al euche	
ONE	in a	in o	in avot	in avoét	in ara	in éro	in arot	in éroét	qu'in euche	
WE	os avons	os avons	os avonmes	os avoinmes	os arons	os érons	os aronmes	os éroinmes	qu'os euchonches / aïonches	aïons
YOU	os avez	os avez	os avotes	os avoétes	os arez	os érez	os arotes	os éroétes	qu'os euchèches / aïèches	aïez
THEY	is ont	il ont	is avotte	is avoétte	is aront	is éront	is arotte	is éroétte	qu'is euhtte	

TO GO : s'in aler (s'en aller)
Indicative							Subjunctive		Imperative	
	Present	Imperfect		Future	Conditional		Present			
		North	South		North	South		Variables		Variables
I	j'm'in vas	ej m'in vos	j'm'in alos	ej m'in aloés / aloais	j'm'in irai	j'm'in iros	ej m'in iroé	qu'ej m'in ale	qu'ej m'in voaiche	
YOU	té t'in vas	tu t'in vos	té t'in alos	tu t'in aloés	tu t'in iros	té t'in iros	tu t'in iroés	qu'té t'in ale	qu'tu t'in voaiches	
HE	i s'in va	i s'in vo	i s'in a lot	i s'in aloét	i s'in iro	i s'in irot	i s'in iroét	qu'i s'in ale	qu'i s'in voaiche	
SHE	ale s'in va	ale s'in vo	ale s'in a lot	ale s'in aloét	ale s'in iro	ale s'in irot	ale s'in iroét	qu'ale s'in ale	qu'ale s'in voaiche	
ONE	in s'in va	in s'in vo	in s'in a lot	in s'in aloét	in s'in ira	in s'in irot	in s'in iroét	qu'in s'in ale	qu'in s'in voaiche	
WE	os nos in alons	os nos in alons	os nos in alonmes	os nos in aloinmes	os nos in irons	os nos in ironmes	os nos in iroinmes	qu'os nos in allotte	qu'os nos in alonches	
YOU	os vos in alez	os vos in alez	os vos in alotes	os vos in aloétes	vos vos in irez	os vos in irotes	os vos in iroétes	qu'os vos in allotte	qu'os vos in alèches	
THEY	is s'in vont	is s'in vont	is s'in alotte	is s'in aloétte	is s'in iront	is s'in irotte	is s'in iroétte	qu'is s'in allote	qu'is s'in voaichtte	

== Vocabulary ==
The majority of Picard words derive from Vulgar Latin.

English	Picard	French
English	Inglé	Anglais
Hello!	Bojour ! or Bojour mes gins ! (formal) or Salut ti z'aute ! (informal)	Bonjour (lit.: Bonjour mes gens ! or Salut vous autres !)
Good evening!	Bonsoèr !	Bonsoir
Good night!	La boinne nuit !	Bonne nuit !
Goodbye!	À s'ervir ! or À l'arvoïure ! or À t'ervir !	Au revoir !
Have a nice day!	Eune boinne jornée !	Bonne journée !
Please/if you please	Sins vos komander (formal) or Sins t' komander (informal)	S'il vous plaît (lit: sans vous commander)
Thank you	Merchi	Merci
I am sorry	Pardon or Échtchusez-mi	Pardon or Excusez-moi
What is your name?	Kmint qu'os vos aplez ?	Comment vous appelez-vous ?
How much?	Combin qu'cha coûte ?	Combien ça coute ?
I do not understand.	Éj n'comprinds poin.	Je ne comprends pas.
Yes, I understand.	Oui, j' comprinds.	Oui, je comprends.
Help!	À la rescousse !	À l'aide (lit.: À la rescousse !)
Can you help me please?	Povez-vos m'aider, sins vos komander ?	Pouvez-vous m'aider, s'il vous plaît ?
Where are the toilets?	D'ousqu'il est ech tchioér ?	Où sont les toillettes ? (Slang: Où sont les chiottes ?)
Do you speak English?	Parlez-vos inglé ?	Parlez-vous anglais ?
I do not speak Picard.	Éj n'pérle poin picard.	Je ne parle pas picard.
I do not know.	Éj n'sais mie.	Je ne sais pas.
I know.	Éj sais.	Je sais.
I am thirsty.	J'ai soé. (literally, "I have thirst")	J'ai soif.
I am hungry.	J'ai fan. (literally, "I have hunger")	J'ai faim.
How are you? / How are things going? / How is everything?	Comint qu'i va ? (formal) or Cha va t'i ?	Comment vas-tu ? or Ça va ?
I am fine.	Cha va fin bien.	Ça va bien.
Sugar	Chuque	Sucre
Crybaby	Brayou	Pleurnicheur (lit: brailleur)

=== Some phrases ===
Many words are very similar to French, but a large number are unique to Picard—principally terms relating to mining or farming.

Here are several typical phrases in Picard, accompanied by French and English translations:

J'ai prins min louchet por mi aler fouir min gardin.

J'ai pris ma bêche pour aller bêcher mon jardin.

"I took my spade to go dig my garden."

Mi, à quate heures, j'archine eune bonne tartine.

Moi, à quatre heures, je mange une bonne tartine.

"At four o'clock, I eat a good snack."

Quind un Ch'ti mi i'est à l'agonie, savez vous bin che qui li rind la vie ? I bot un d'mi. (Les Capenoules (a music group))

Quand un gars du Nord est à l'agonie, savez-vous bien ce qui lui rend la vie ? Il boit un demi.

"When a northerner is dying, do you know what revives him? He drinks a pint."

Pindant l'briquet un galibot composot, assis sur un bos,
L'air d'eune musique qu'i sifflotot
Ch'étot tellemint bin fabriqué, qu'les mineurs lâchant leurs briquets
Comminssotent à's'mette à'l'danser (Edmond Tanière - La polka du mineur)

Pendant le casse-croûte un jeune mineur composa, assis sur un bout de bois
L'air d'une musique qu'il sifflota
C'était tellement bien fait que les mineurs, lâchant leurs casse-croûte
Commencèrent à danser.

"During lunch a young miner composed, seated on a piece of wood
"The melody of a tune that he whistled
"It was so well done that the miners, leaving their sandwiches,
"Started to dance to it" (Edmond Tanière - La polka du mineur, "The Miner's Polka")

I n'faut pas qu'ches glaines is cantent pus fort que ch'co.

Il ne faut pas que les poules chantent plus fort que le coq.

"Hens must not sing louder than the rooster" (n. b. this saying really refers to men and women rather than poultry)

J' m'in vo à chlofe, lo qu'i n'passe poin d'caroche.

Je vais au lit, là où il ne passe pas de carrosse.

"I go to bed where no car is running."

Moqueu d'gins

railleur, persifleur (lit. moqueur des gens)

"someone who mocks or jeers at people" (compare gens, which is French for "people")

Ramaseu d'sous

personne âpre au gain (lit. ramasseur de sous)

"a greedy person"

Cardinal numbers in Picard from 1 to 20 are as follows:

English	Picard	French
One	un (m) / eune (f)	un (m) / une (f)
Two	deus	deux
Three	troés	trois
Four	quate	quatre
Five	chonc	cinq
Six	sis	six
Seven	sèt	sept
Eight	uit	huit
Nine	neu	neuf
Ten	dis	dix
Eleven	onze	onze
Twelve	dousse	douze
Thirteen	trèsse	treize
Fourteen	quatore	quatorze
Fifteen	tchinse	quinze
Sixteen	sèse	seize
Seventeen	dis-sèt	dix-sept
Eighteen	dis-uit	dix-huit
Nineteen	dis-neu	dix-neuf
Twenty	vint	vingt

== Learning Picard ==
Picard, although primarily a spoken language, has a body of written literature: poetry, songs ("P'tit quinquin" for example), comic books, etc.

A number of dictionaries and patois guides also exist (for French speakers):

- René Debrie, Le cours de picard pour tous - Eche pikar, bèl é rade (le Picard vite et bien). Parlers de l'Amiénois. Paris, Omnivox, 1983 (+ 2 cassettes), 208p.
- Alain Dawson, Le picard de poche. Paris : Assimil, 2003, 192p.
- Alain Dawson, Le "chtimi" de poche, parler du Nord et du Pas-de-Calais. Paris : Assimil, 2002, 194p.
- Armel Depoilly (A. D. d'Dérgny), Contes éd no forni, et pi Ramintuvries (avec lexique picard-français). Abbeville : Ch'Lanchron, 1998, 150p.
- Jacques Dulphy, Ches diseux d'achteure : diries 1989. Amiens : Picardies d'Achteure, 1992, 71p. + cassette
- Gaston Vasseur, Dictionnaire des parlers picards du Vimeu (Somme), avec index français-picard (par l'équipe de Ch'Lanchron d'Abbeville). Fontenay-sous-Bois : SIDES, 1998 (rééd. augmentée), 816p. (11.800 termes)
- Gaston Vasseur, Grammaire des parlers picards du Vimeu (Somme) - morphologie, syntaxe, anthropologie et toponymie. 1996, 144p.

== Sample text ==
Article 1 of the Universal Declaration of Human Rights

- in Picard:
  Preume artike: Ches honmes pi ches fanmes is vien't tertous au monne libe, aveuc ches minmes drots pi l'minme dignité. Leu raison pi leu conschienche is font qu'is ont l'dévoér dé s'conduire inter eus conme des frères.
- in English: All human beings are born free and equal in dignity and rights. They are endowed with reason and conscience and should act towards one another in a spirit of brotherhood.

== See also ==
- Joret line
- Languages of Europe
