= Wasser, Germany =

Coordinates: 48°07′17″N 7°50′57″E

Wasser is a village in southwest Germany, in the Upper Rhine Valley, located at the Elz River. In June 2005, Wasser had 1717 inhabitants. In the mid-1970s it was part incorporated into the city of Emmendingen.
