= The Front Page =

1928 Broadway comedy

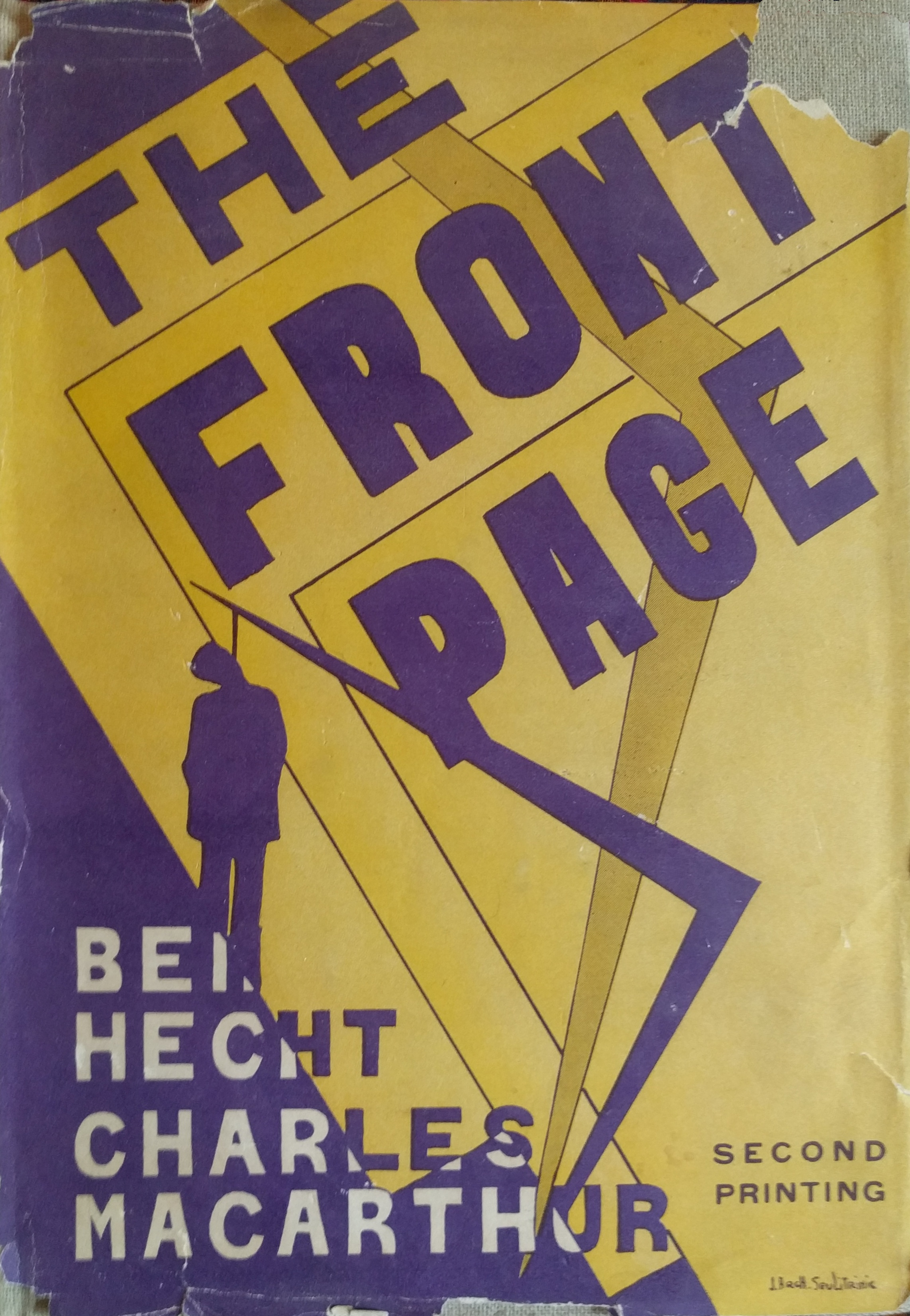
- Second edition, 1928
- Original language: English
- Written by: Ben Hecht; Charles MacArthur
- Genre: Comedy
- Setting: The Press Room of the Criminal Courts Building in Chicago, 1928

Premiere
- Date: August 14, 1928
- Place: Times Square Theatre; New York City

The Front Page is a Broadway comedy about newspaper reporters on the police beat. Written by former Chicago reporters Ben Hecht and Charles MacArthur, it was first produced in 1928 and has been adapted for the cinema several times.

== Plot ==
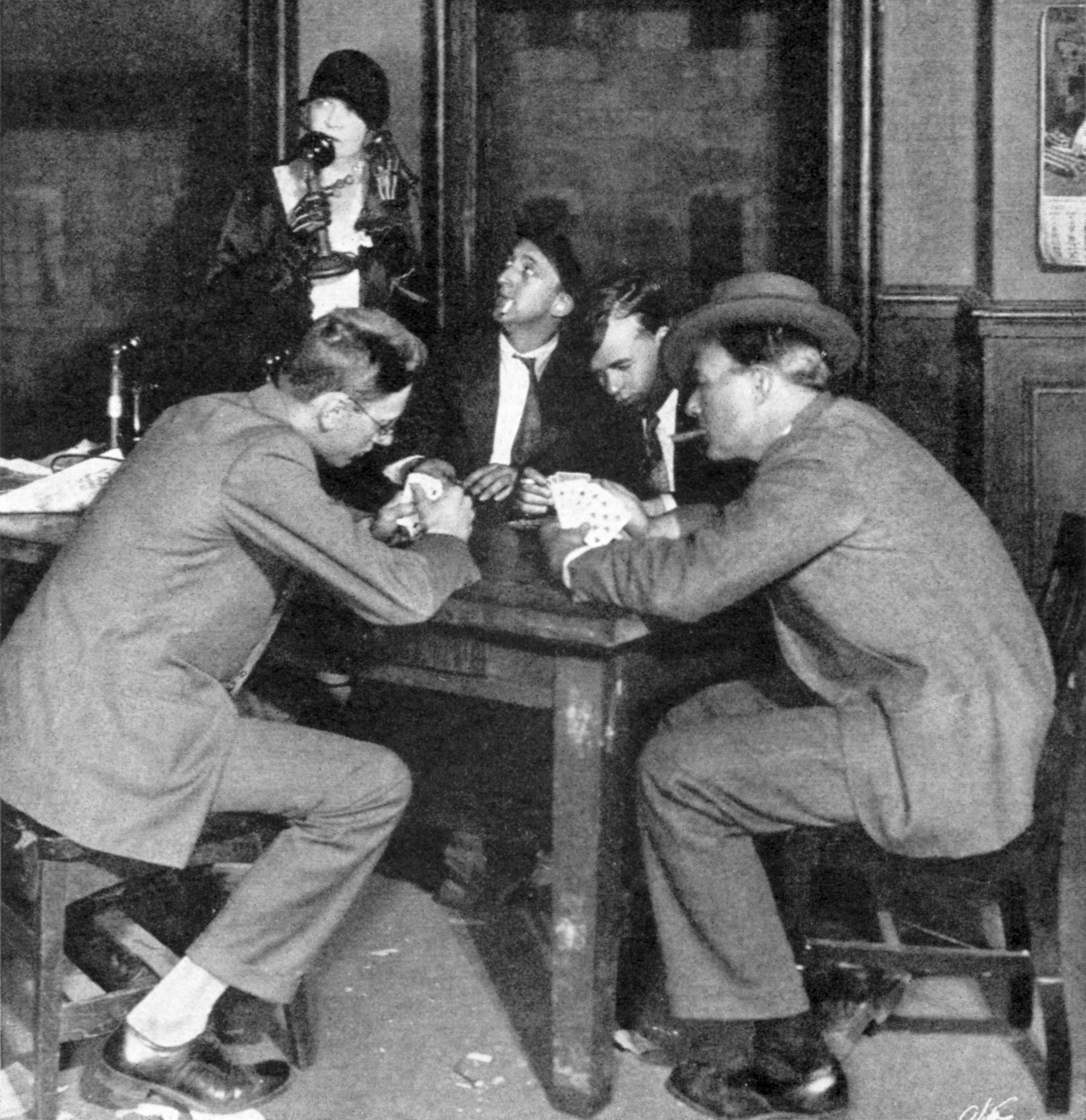
Reporters play cards in the press room of the Criminal Courts Building in Act I of The Front Page (1928).

The play's single set is the dingy press room of Chicago's Criminal Courts Building, overlooking the gallows behind the Cook County Jail. Reporters from most of the city's newspapers are passing the time with poker and pungent wisecracks about the news of the day. Soon they will witness the hanging of Earl Williams, a white man and supposed Communist revolutionary convicted of killing a black policeman. Hildy Johnson, cocky star reporter for the Examiner, is late. He appears only to say goodbye; he is quitting to get a respectable job and be married. Suddenly the reporters hear that Earl Williams has escaped from the jail. All but Hildy stampede out for more information. As Hildy tries to decide how to react, Williams comes in through the window. He tells Hildy he is no revolutionary, and that he shot the police officer by accident. The reporter realizes this bewildered, harmless little man was railroaded—just to help the crooked mayor and sheriff pick up enough black votes to win re-election. It is the story of a lifetime. Hildy helps Williams hide inside a roll-top desk. His daunting challenge now is to get Williams out of the building to a safe place for an interview before rival reporters or trigger-happy policemen discover him. Hildy has no choice but to ask for help from Walter Burns, managing editor of the Examiner—a devious tyrant who would do just about anything to keep Hildy with the newspaper.

== Cast and characters ==
Character	Broadway original (1928)	Broadway revival (1986)	Broadway revival (2016)
Walter Burns	Osgood Perkins	John Lithgow	Nathan Lane
Hildy Johnson	Lee Tracy	Richard Thomas	John Slattery
Sheriff Hartman	Claude Cooper	Richard B. Shull	John Goodman
Bensinger	Walter Baldwin	Jeff Weiss	Jefferson Mays
Mrs. Grant	Violet Barney	Anita Dangler	Holland Taylor
Mollie Malloy	Dorothy Stickney	Amanda Carlin	Sherie Rene Scott
Mr. Pincus	Frank Conlan	Patrick Garner	Robert Morse
McCue	William Foran	Philip LeStrange	Dylan Baker
Jennie	Carrie Weller	Anita Dangler	Patricia Conolly
Peggy Grant	Frances Fuller	Amanda Carlin	Halley Feiffer
The Mayor	George Barbier	Jerome Dempsey	Dann Florek
Earl Williams	George Leach	Paul Stolarsky	John Magaro
Diamond Louis	Eduardo Ciannelli	Michael Rothhaar	Danny Mastrogiorgio
Murphy	Willard Robertson	Ed Lauter	Christopher McDonald
Schwartz	Tammany Young	Lee Wilkof	David Pittu
Wilson	Vincent York	Philip Le Strange	Joey Slotnick
Endicott	Allen Jenkins	Bernie McInerney	Lewis J. Stadlen
Woodenshoes Eichorn	Jay Wilson	Jack Wallace	Micah Stock
Kruger	Joseph Calleia	Richard Peterson	Clarke Thorell
Frank	Gene West	Philip LeStrange	Joe Forbich
Policeman	Larry Doyle	Patrick Garner	Michael X. Martin
Second Policeman	George T. Fleming	Richard Peterson	Jonathan Spivey
Carl	Matthew Crowley	Michael Rothhaar	Tony Ward
Tony	N/A	Richard Preston	Michael X. Martin

The Front Page was produced by Jed Harris and directed by George S. Kaufman, with settings by Raymond Sovey. It opened at the Times Square Theatre, New York City, on August 14, 1928, and ran 278 performances before closing in April 1929.

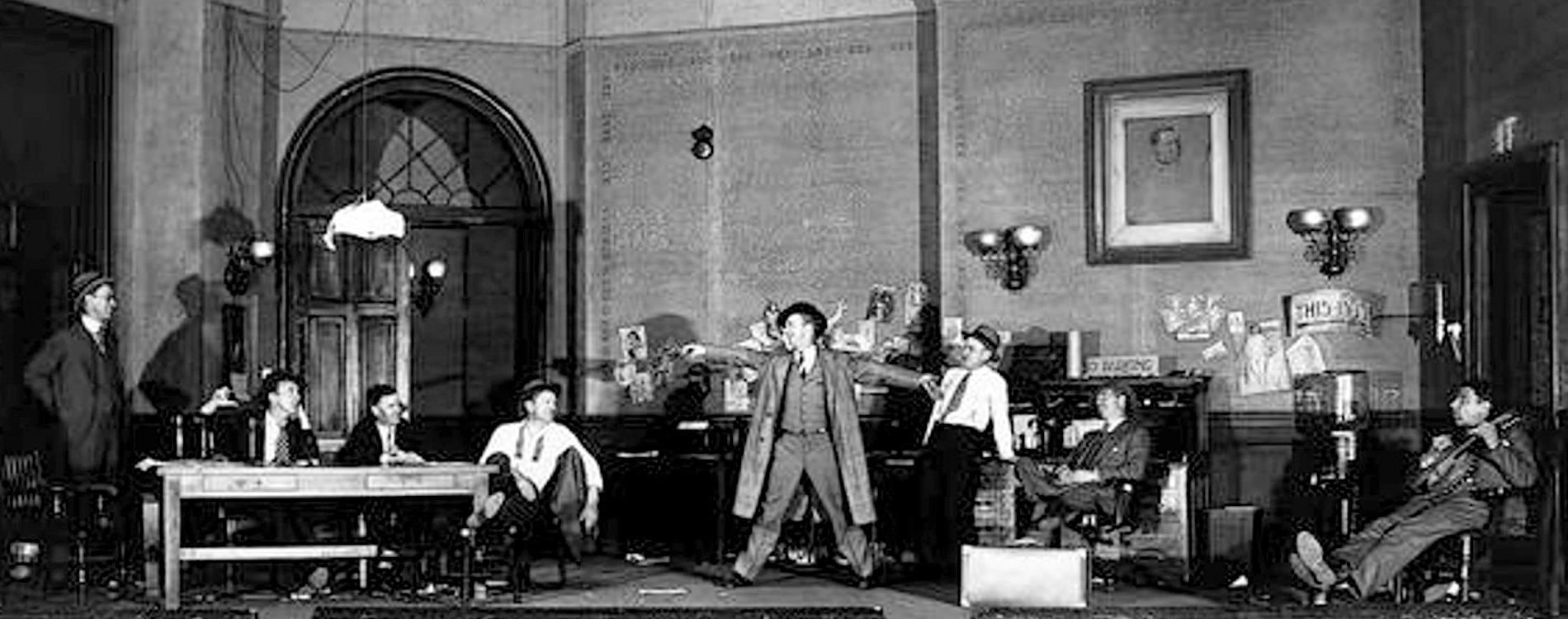
The press room of the Chicago Criminal Courts Building

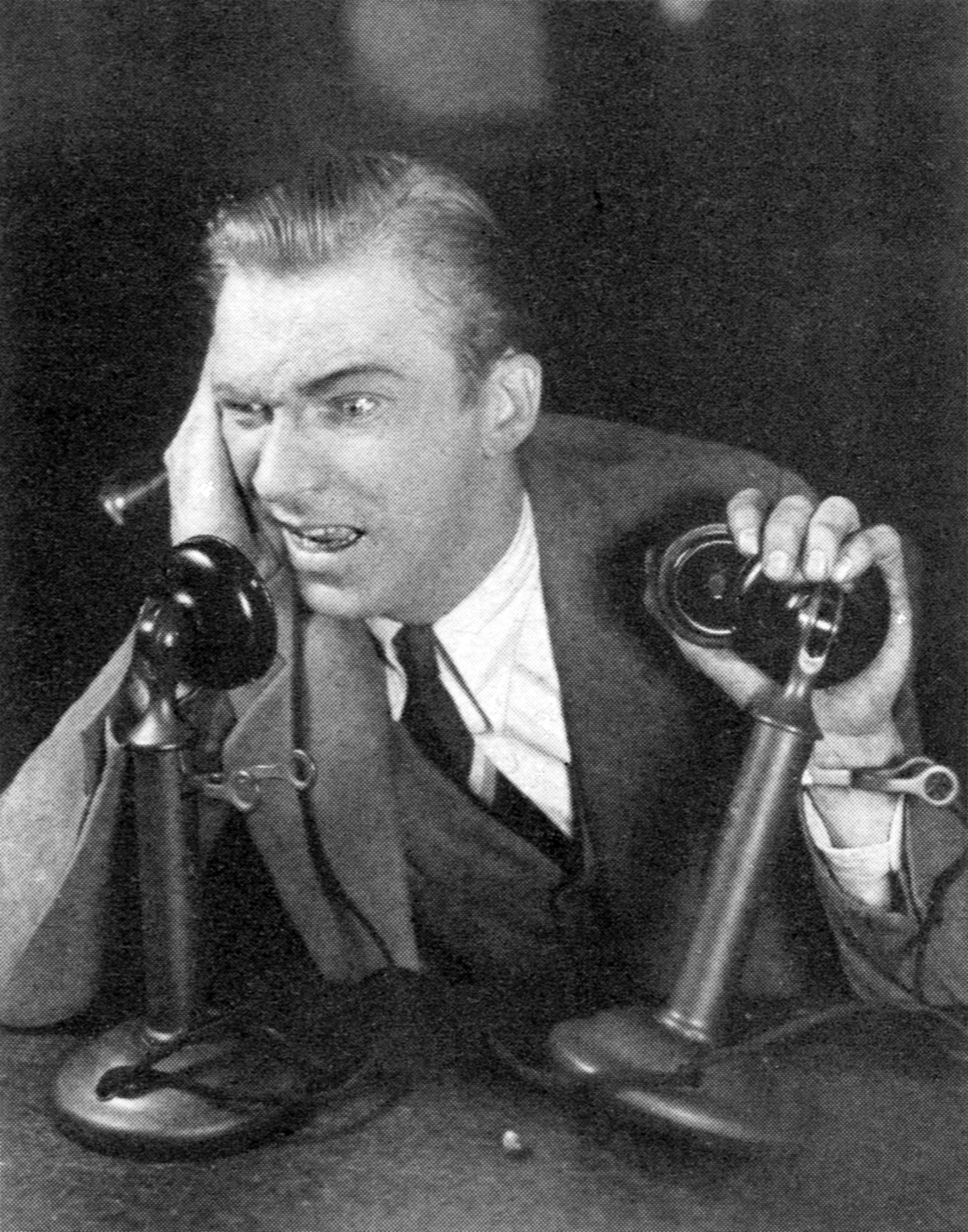
Lee Tracy as Hildy Johnson

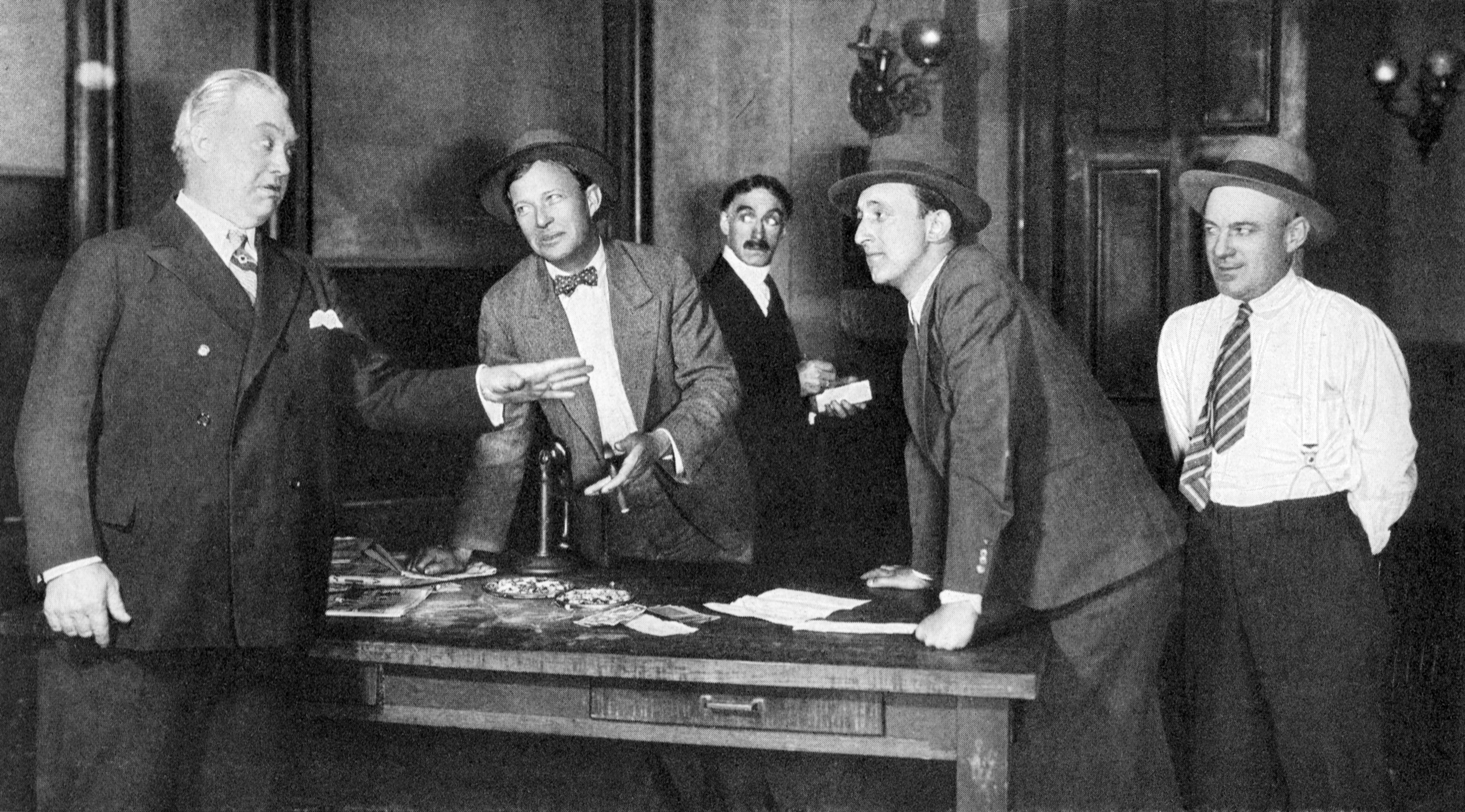
George Barbier (The Mayor), Willard Robertson (Murphy), Claude Cooper (Sheriff Hartman), Allen Jenkins (Endicott), William Foran (McCue)

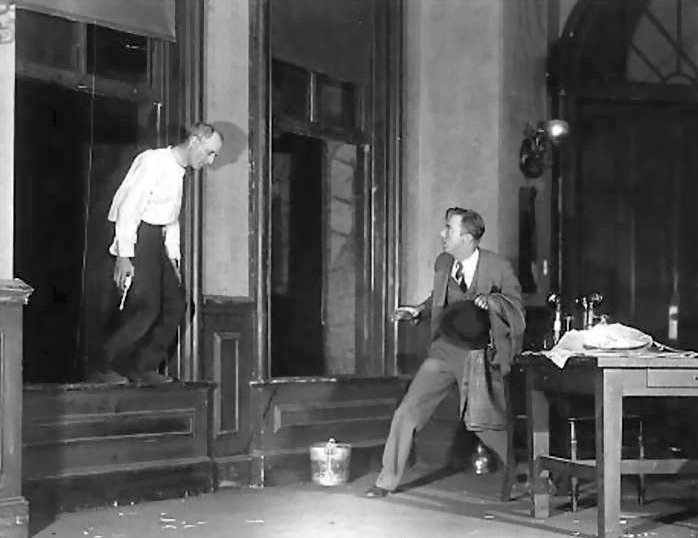
George Leach (Earl Williams), Lee Tracy (Hildy Johnson)

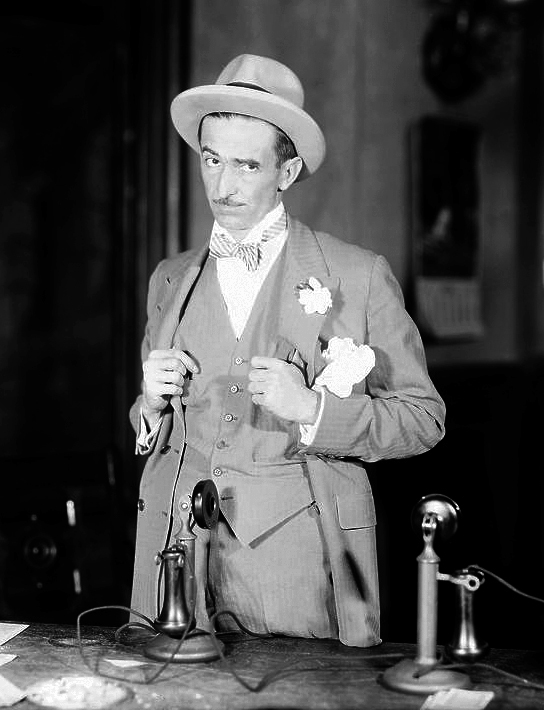
Osgood Perkins as Walter Burns

== Significance ==
The authors' expert plotting and rapid-fire, streetwise dialogue delighted audiences and made their play an instant classic. Hecht and MacArthur strongly influenced many other American comic writers, especially in Hollywood. In the 1970s, film producer Dore Schary told film historian David Bordwell that The Front Page influenced studio writers and directors in the 1930s. The play popularized the image of American journalists as fast-talking, wisecracking "hard-boiled" types, excessively fond of alcohol and hard living in general, who would go to any lengths to get a story on the front page of their newspapers.

The newspapers are modeled on the City News Bureau of Chicago (where MacArthur had worked), Chicago Daily News (where Hecht was a reporter), and William Randolph Hearst's Chicago's American. The character Earl Williams is loosely based on "Terrible" Tommy O'Connor. The character of Williams also was at least partially based on the case of Thomas Mooney, a radical leftist sentenced to death on the basis of questionable evidence. Walter Burns is a thinly disguised caricature of Hearst editor Walter Howey. The corrupt Mayor of Chicago seems to have been based on William Hale Thompson, who, like the mayor in the play, depended in part upon black voters to stay in office. Commenting on the play's seeming veracity, New York Times theater critic Brooks Atkinson wrote, "The authors and directors have packed an evening with loud, rapid, coarse and unfailing entertainment. No one who has ground his heels in the grime of a police headquarters press room will complain that this argot misrepresents the gentlemen of the press."

== Revivals ==
The play was restaged four more times on Broadway. The 1969–70 revival was the most successful of these. It was produced at the Ethel Barrymore Theatre and starred Robert Ryan and Bert Convy as Burns and Johnson, running for a total of 222 performances. The 1946 revival was directed by Charles MacArthur and ran for 79 performances. The 1986–87 revival was produced at the Vivian Beaumont at Lincoln Center, directed by Jerry Zaks and starred Richard Thomas as Hildy and John Lithgow as Burns. This production ran for 57 performances.

A Broadway revival opened at the Broadhurst Theatre, in a limited engagement, starting on September 20, 2016, in previews and officially on October 20. Directed by Jack O'Brien, the cast starred Nathan Lane as Walter Burns, John Slattery as Hildy Johnson, John Goodman as Sheriff Hartman, Jefferson Mays as Bensinger, Holland Taylor as Mrs. Grant, Sherie Rene Scott as Mollie Malloy, Robert Morse as Silas Pinkus, and Christopher McDonald as Murphy. The production received generally good notices, especially for Lane, and became the first show of the season to recoup and turn a profit. It received two Tony nominations: Best Featured Actor in a Play (Lane) and Best Scenic Design of a Play (Douglas W. Schmidt).

John Guare's theatrical adaptation of the film His Girl Friday was produced at The La Jolla Playhouse in San Diego, California, in 2013, directed by Christopher Ashley.

Jeffrey Hatcher's adaptation was produced at Northlight Theatre in Evanston, Illinois, in 2026, directed by B.J. Jones.

== Adaptations ==
The Front Page has been adapted for film,radio and television a number of times:

- The Front Page (1931), directed by Lewis Milestone, starring Adolphe Menjou and Pat O'Brien.
- The 1931 film was presented as a one-hour radio adaption on June 28, 1937, by Lux Radio Theatre, starring Walter Winchell and James Gleason.
- His Girl Friday (1940), directed by Howard Hawks, starring Cary Grant as Walter and Rosalind Russell as Hildy, who in this version is a woman and Walter's ex-wife. A romantic element is added to the plot, as Walter is trying to win Hildy back both professionally and personally.
- In 1940 Lux Radio Theatre adapted His Girl Friday as a one-hour radio play starring Claudette Colbert (who turned down the film role) as Hildy and Fred MacMurray as Walter Burns. It was broadcast on September 30, 1940.
- The 1931 film was adapted for radio on June 22, 1946, by Academy Award Theater, with Menjou and O'Brien reprising their roles from the film.
- A 1948 radio series titled The Front Page and based loosely on the play ran on the American Broadcasting Company (ABC) network. It starred Dick Powell and William Conrad.
- The Front Page (1949), CBS Television series, starring John Daly and Mark Roberts.
- The Front Page (1974), directed by Billy Wilder, starring Jack Lemmon and Walter Matthau.
- Switching Channels (1988), starring Burt Reynolds and Kathleen Turner, with the newspaper reporters updated to television reporters and none of the original dialogue retained.

His Girl Friday and Switching Channels changed the male lead Hildebrand "Hildy" Johnson to women, Hildegaard "Hildy" Johnson and Christy Colleran respectively. John Varley's 1991 science fiction novel Steel Beach takes the story—and the change of sex—to another level; the plot includes a sex-change by a male reporter named Hildy Johnson.

There have also been four television productions, all under the title The Front Page:

- 1945, in the US;
- 1948, in the UK;
- 1949–1950 (see above) in the US as a series on CBS;
- 1970, in the US

The musical Windy City (book and lyrics by Dick Vosburgh, music by Tony Macaulay) was also based on The Front Page. It premiered at the Victoria Palace Theatre, London, England on July 20, 1982 and ran for 250 performances.

Additionally, Hecht and MacArthur's story for the 1939 film Gunga Din recycles their basic plot of trying to dissuade someone from leaving his job, in this case Douglas Fairbanks Jr.'s character attempting to resign his post in the British army and comrades Cary Grant and Victor McLaglen conniving to prevent it.

Film critic Leonard Maltin describes the 1940 film Torrid Zone as a 3.5-out-of-4-star “variation on Front Page”. Set among the highly competitive banana plantations of Central America, it stars James Cagney as the invaluable employee, Pat O'Brien as the amoral boss who will stop at nothing to keep him from leaving, George Tobias as a revolutionary awaiting the firing squad, and Ann Sheridan as love interest, with snappy dialogue provided by Richard Macaulay and Jerry Wald.

The 2013 graphic novel, Nemo: Heart of Ice, by Alan Moore and Kevin O'Neill, has a prose afterword purportedly written by Hildy Johnson, who visits Lincoln Island to write about the wedding of Captain Nemo's granddaughter to the son of Robur the Conqueror.

== Awards and nomination ==
=== 1928 Broadway production ===
Year	Award	Category	Nominee	Result	Ref.
1928	Burns Mantle's The Best Plays of 1928–29		The Front Page	Won	

=== 1986 Broadway revival ===
Year	Award	Category	Nominee	Result	Ref.
1987	Tony Awards	Best Revival		Nominated	
1987	Tony Awards	Best Scenic Design	Tony Walton	Nominated	
1987	Drama Desk Award	Outstanding Set Design	Tony Walton	Nominated	

=== 2016 Broadway revival ===
Year	Award	Category	Nominee	Result	Ref.
2017	Tony Awards	Best Featured Actor in a Play	Nathan Lane	Nominated	
2017	Tony Awards	Best Scenic Design of a Play	Douglas W. Schmidt	Nominated	
2017	Drama Desk Award	Outstanding Revival of a Play		Nominated	
2017	Drama Desk Award	Outstanding Featured Actor in a Play	Nathan Lane	Nominated	
2017	Drama Desk Award	Outstanding Scenic Design of a Play	Douglas W. Schmidt	Nominated	
2017	Drama Desk Award	Outstanding Costume Design of a Play	Ann Roth	Nominated	

== See also ==
- Chicago (play), a contemporary play that also critiques the Chicago criminal justice system
- List of United States comedy films
