= Gaston Vasseur =

French linguist (1904-1971)

Gaston Vasseur (1904–1971) was a French linguist. He obtained his PhD at the Sorbonne in 1948 (Le parler picard de Nibas et sa grammaire).

Gaston Vasseur was born in Nibas (Somme) in 1904, and died in 1971.

Gaston Vasseur was one of the masters of dialectology of Picard whom he greatly enriched by his work. He has published numerous books and lexicons of dialectology.

In 1967 in Abbeville, he is the founder of the groupe des Picardisants du Ponthieu et du Vimeu.

== Bibliography ==
This is only part of the work of Gaston Vasseur.

- Dictionnaire des Parlers Picards du Vimeu (Somme) avec considération spéciale du dialecte de Nibas, Musée de Picardie éd., Amiens, (1963) and Sides, Fontenay-sous-bois, (1998).
- Grammaire des parlers picards du Vimeu, Somme : avec considération spéciale du dialecte de Nibas, 142 pages, F. Paillart éd., ASIN B000X8CMNM, (1996)
- Lexique serrurier du Vimeu, (Préface de Jean Mennesson, Introduction de Charles Bruneau), Publications Romanes et Françaises n° 29, 80 pages, Librairie Droz, ISBN 2-600-02925-7, (1950)
- Lexique picard du tisserand (1951)
- Lexique picard du tourbier (1959)
- Lexique picard du vannier (1964)
- Lexique picard du fondeur malléable (1964)
- Lexique picard du cordierier (1964)
- Lexique vimeusien du patinier (1965)
- Lexique picard du matelot valèricain (1969)
- Lexique du cleftier de Dargnies (with Armel Depoilly) (1969)
- Lexique picard du tailleur de limes (with Armel Depoilly) (1970)
- Blason populaire du Vimeu (1945)
- Proverbes et dictons des parlers vimeusiens, collection de la Société de Dialectologie Picarde, tome IV, Éditeur : Archives du Pas-de-Calais, Abbeville, impr. Lafosse, 84 pages, ASIN B0014OD6T8 (1960)
- Histoire d'un village picard. Nibas et ses annexes, Préface de M. Adrien Huguet, 289 pages, Éditeur : Impr. G. Bourgeois, ASIN: B001BN5FMS (1929)
- Les Brigands de l'an III dans le canton de Gamaches, Éditeur : Impr. du Pilote de la Somme, 12 pages, ASIN: B001BN0BWW (1937)
- Un prêtre picard compagnon de St Vincent de Paul Firmin Get, Éditeur : Impr. du Pilote de la Somme, 16 pages, ASIN: B001BN0BRW (1937)
- Un village picard pendant la Révolution Buigny-lès-Gamaches, Éditeur : Impr. du Pilote de la Somme, 15 pages, ASIN: B001BN7ELI (1937)
- Casimir Leseigneur, dit Montmorin, Éditeur : Impr. du Messager eudois, Eu, 8 pages, ASIN: B001BN24BS (1938)
- L'Abbé Charles Ozenne, compagnon de St-Vincent de Paul 1613–1658, Éditeur : Impr. du Pilote de la Somme, 30 pages, ASIN: B001BN7ERW (1938)
- La Balle au tamis, Editeu : Société d'émulation historique et littéraire, 31 pages, ASIN: B001BN7EQS (1945)
- Sous la botte. (Préface par Étienne Chantrel), Éditeur : Impr. de F. Paillart, 139 pages, ASIN: B001BN3LHO, (1945)
- Vingt-cinq ans après : Souvenirs de l'occupation, 112 pages, Éditeur : Impr. Lafosse, ASIN: B0014O7SHY, (1965)
- Jean de l'Ours (1949 et 1984)
- L'sermon d'Messire Grégoére, imprimerie du Marquenterre, 8 pages, (1952 pi 1997)
- Vieilles souvenances, illustré par Jean Sgard, 4 poèmes : Dins no vieille boutique - L ' picard - Chés gléneuses - Dins no vin platchu; Abbeville, (1952)
- Vieilles chansons (dessins de Jean Sgard) (1953)
- Vieilles fables (avec Jean Sgard) (1955)
- Pages d'autrefois (1956)
- Réflexions Sur Les "Proverbes Et Dictons Des Parlers Vimeusiens" De Gaston Vasseur, Delattre Jean, Lafosse éd., (1962)
- De mon temps, Éditeur : P. Duclercq impr. F. Paillart, 91 pages, ASIN B0014O9JK8, (1965)
- Contes d'ém grand-mére (1966)
- Paul Vimereu, écrivain picard : 1881–1962, 27 pages, Éditeur : C.R.D.P. Impr. C.R.D.P., ASIN B0014O9JCQ (1966)
- Évocations, Éditeur : P. Duclercq, 87 pages, ASIN B0014OBNSO, (1968)
- Le pays picard : Deux leçons d'histoire locale, Éditeur : Centre régional de documentation pédagogique, 32 pages, ASIN B0014OBNM0 (1968)
- Histoéres du viux temps, Abbeville (1969)
- Vieux fabliaux (1971)
- Lettes a min cousin Polyte (1938 – 1971), Collection de la Société de linguistique picarde, 945 pages, Éditeur : F. Paillart, ASIN: B000WSLCKM, (2002)
- Chronique de Pierre le Prestre, abbé de Saint-Riquier, 1457–1480 : texte établi sur le manuscrit 94 de la bibliothèque d'Abbeville par Gaston Vasseur; Éditeur: Abbaye de Saint-Riquier, Abbeville) (1971)
- Poètes de chez nous, (présentés par Lucien Cénat et Gaston Vasseur), Éditeur : Impr. de F. Paillart, 63 pages, ASIN: B001BN249U (1948)
