= Matt Vassar =

American psychiatrist

- Citizenship: American
- Education: Oklahoma State University
- Scientific career
- Workplaces: Oklahoma State University Center for Health Sciences

Matt Vassar is a professor of Psychiatry and Behavioral Sciences at Oklahoma State University Center for Health Sciences. He is known for meta-research into biases that affect research processes or outcomes.

== Biography ==
Vassar's initial training was in sociology. He then completed a doctorate in Research, Evaluation, Measurement, and Statistics at Oklahoma State University.

== Research ==
Vassar's research has included descriptive analyses demonstrating a high burden of industry payments to physicians, leading to conflicts of interest of physicians of influence, including those on clinical practice guideline committees in oncology and urology. He has also demonstrated that public awareness of medical or societal issues is affected by television shows, such as how Stranger Things, which features an actor with cleidocranial dysplasia, increased awareness about this rare medical condition. Similarly, Vassar also demonstrated that an episode of the television show Grey's Anatomy about sexual assault increased the number of calls to assault hotlines.

Other areas of research include spin in abstracts of medical reports, the robustness of statistical significance of clinical trials, and the reproducibility of meta-analyses. His research has been presented in over 200 published manuscripts.
