= Gurdon Saltonstall Hubbard =

American pioneer

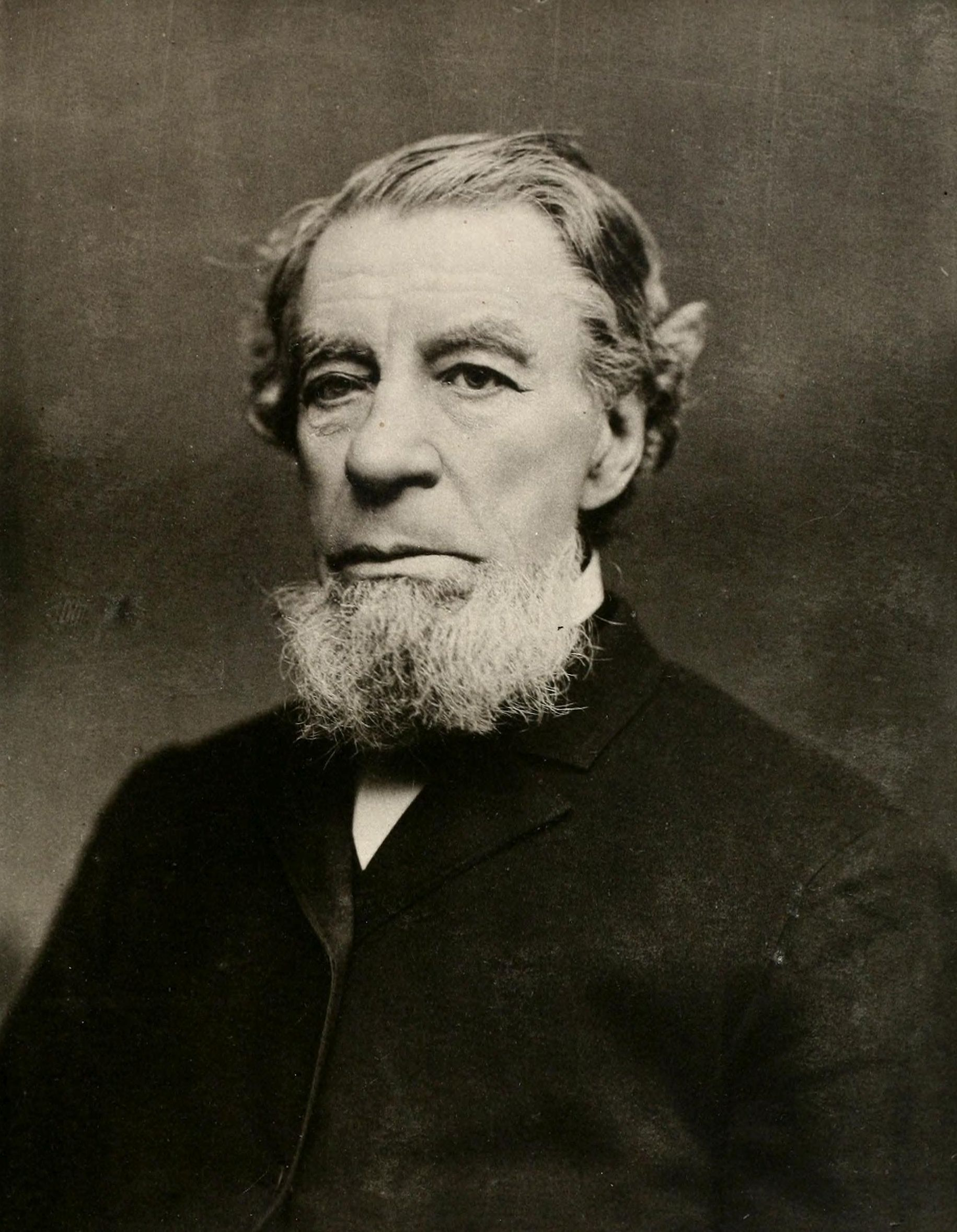

Alderman of the Chicago Common Council from the 7th Ward
- In office 1860–1862 Serving with John Alston (1860–1861) and Alonzo Harvey (1861–1862)
- Preceded by: Henry Wendt
- Succeeded by: James Conlan

Trustee of the Town of Chicago
- In office 1835 – March 4, 1837

Member of the Illinois House of Representatives
- In office 1832–1834

Personal details
- Born: August 22, 1802 Windsor, Vermont, U.S.
- Died: September 14, 1886 (aged 84) Chicago, Illinois, U.S.
- Resting place: Graceland Cemetery; 41.954820°N 87.661890°W
- Spouses: Watseka (m. 1824–1826) Eleanora Berry (m. 1831; died 1838)
- Known for: Early Chicago resident

Gurdon Saltonstall Hubbard (August 22, 1802 – September 14, 1886) was an American fur trader, insurance underwriter, and land speculator. He was influential in the development of the city of Chicago and responsible for its growth during the 19th century. First arriving in Chicago in 1818, he settled in the area in the late 1820s. He became one of the most prominent residents of the town and was one of its first trustees in 1833. He went on to build Chicago's first stockyard and help foment a land boom for Chicago in the East.

In addition to his work in developing and promoting Chicago, Hubbard was known for his athletic prowess. Hubbard Street in Chicago is named for him, as is Hubbard High School.

== Early life ==
Gurdon Saltonstall Hubbard was born in Windsor, Vermont, on August 22, 1802. His parents were Abigail Sage and Elizur Hubbard. Sage was a daughter of the general Comfort Sage and his wife Sarah Hamlin, and was from Middletown, Connecticut. The elder Hubbard was a son of the Revolutionary War officer George Hubbard and his wife Thankful Hatch. Hubbard was descended from and named for the Connecticut governor Gurdon Saltonstall.

Hubbard disliked going to school at an early age and was often truant. When his father, a lawyer, lost his money in 1812 in speculative ventures, his aunt took him in at her house in Bridgewater, Massachusetts, where he was educated. The situation of the Hubbards continued to worsen, and the elder Hubbard decided to take the rest of the family north to settle in Montreal and continue his practice. Hubbard left Bridgewater to join them and they departed in early May 1815. The family discovered upon their arrival that Elizur could not practice law as he was an American, but made money by renting a house to lodgers.

Hubbard started working at a local hardware store in April 1816. He befriended John Dyde, the son of a boarding house proprietor. Dyde's father housed William Matthews, an agent of the American Fur Company. In 1818 an expedition of the company was planned for Mackinac Island, Michigan, with 12 young men needed as clerks. Dyde informed Hubbard of this and expressed a desire to go, eventually pressuring Matthews into including him. Hubbard also became interested in the expedition, but was discouraged from applying by his family, Dyde, and coworkers at the hardware store. He nevertheless persisted in his attempts and eventually obtained the consent of his parents and Matthews, and was indentured to the company for five years at $120 per year. While clerking at the store, Hubbard was an eyewitness to the accidental shooting of Alexis St. Martin in 1822, whose recovery under Dr. William Beaumont with a permanent hole in his stomach was considered a medical miracle and allowed Beaumont to make observations that revolutionized the study of digestion.

== Early Chicago ==
Hubbard at age 28, by Anson Dickinson

Hubbard first arrived in Chicago on October 1, 1818, as a member of a brigade led by Antoine Deschamps. Hubbard carried an introduction to John Kinzie, a trader in Chicago, whose son, Morris, had befriended Hubbard. Although Hubbard eventually became a major booster of Chicago and one of its leading citizens, he wouldn't make his permanent home in the city until 1834.

Dr. Alexander Wolcott, the Indian agent at Chicago, died in October 1830. Hubbard expressed a desire to be chosen as his successor, but was passed over in favor of Thomas Jefferson Vance Owen of Kaskaskia, Illinois.

On several trips throughout Illinois, he became the adopted son of Chief Waba of the Kickapoo and married Watseka, niece of Chief Tamin of the Kankakee Potawatomi.

After he walked for 75 miles (121 km) (Note: Traveling by foot, which is typically around 3 miles per hour, on average, would require over 20 hours to travel a distance of 75 miles. Furthermore, even if assuming his pace was equivalent to the best modern day long distance runners 75 miles would require between 10-15 hours to travel.) in a single night to warn the town of Danville, Illinois, of an impending raid by Indians, he earned the nickname "Pa-pa-ma-ta-be," or "Swift-Walker." To those who doubted his 75-mile run he mentioned the story of Pierre La Claire, who traveled 90 miles (140 km) from St. Joseph, Michigan, to Chicago to warn his uncle John Kinzie of the impending War of 1812. A local Indian tribe questioned his abilities and challenged him to an endurance contest with their champion walker. Hubbard's challenger lost by several miles and was unable to move the next day, while Hubbard seemed to be unaffected.

Hubbard married Eleanora Berry on May 17, 1831. They remained married until her death from peritonitis on January 28, 1838, shortly after giving birth to a son.

Hubbard served in the Illinois House of Representatives from 1832 to 1834 from Vermilion County, Illinois. Despite running as a Whig in a heavily-Democratic area, he was easily elected. He represented Vermilion County during the 8th Illinois General Assembly. While there, he advocated ending the Illinois and Michigan Canal at the Chicago River instead of the Calumet River, arguing that a Calumet River terminal would make Indiana benefit more from the canal than Illinois.

== Life in Chicago ==
Upon settling in Chicago in 1834, Hubbard purchased a cabin near Lake Michigan from Billy Caldwell and became one of the village's first trustees. Shortly thereafter, Hubbard became the first investor in Gilbert Knapp's claim on the settlement of Port Gilbert, 60 miles north of Chicago, which became the city of Racine, Wisconsin.

In Chicago, Hubbard became a leading figure in the fur trade and opened the first meat packing plant in Chicago as part of his work to supply Fort Dearborn with meat. In support of this business, he built the first warehouse, known as "Hubbard's Folly," in Chicago on the south bank of the Chicago River, near modern-day LaSalle Street.

Building his fortune in meats and furs allowed Hubbard to enter into the insurance business, and he was the first underwriter in Chicago. Following the Great Chicago Fire in 1871, he was nearly bankrupted by the insurance payments he had to make, but he was able to survive the setback.

Hubbard was the owner of the Lady Elgin, a steamship which was rammed by a schooner and sank in 1860 off of the coast of present-day Winnetka, Illinois. Although Hubbard accepted insurance money for the loss, he never abandoned ownership of the ship, which was discovered in 1989. 1860 also saw Hubbard elected alderman of Chicago's 7th Ward.

In the late 1860s, Hubbard began work on his autobiography and had produced an 800-page manuscript which was destroyed in the Great Chicago Fire. Following the fire, he set to work to reproduce the manuscript, only completing it up to 1829 at the time of his death.

== After the fire ==
Hubbard partly recovered from his financial setbacks following the Great Chicago Fire, but his health began to deteriorate. In 1883, he became ill and in 1884, he had his left eye removed. The following year, his right eye was removed. Hubbard died on September 14, 1886, and was buried in Graceland Cemetery.

== Legacy ==
The historian Lloyd Wendt wrote in 1986 that Hubbard "as much or more than any other man ... [made] Chicago the great city it became."

- Hubbard Street, Chicago, Illinois
- Hubbard High School, Chicago, Illinois
- Hubbard's Cave, a tunnel in Chicago carrying the Kennedy Expressway (I-90/I-94) under several railroads and city streets, including Hubbard Street

== Works cited ==
- Heise, Kenan; Baumann, Ed (1990). Chicago Originals. Chicago: Bonus Books. ISBN 0-933893-94-9.
- Hubbard, Gurdon S. (1911). The Autobiography of Gurdon Saltonstall Hubbard: Pa-pa-ma-ta-be, "The Swift Walker". Chicago: Lakeside Press.
- Miller, Donald I. (1996). City of the Century: The Epic of Chicago and the Making of America. New York: Simon & Schuster. ISBN 0-684-80194-9.
- Wendt, Lloyd (1986). Swift Walker: An Informal Biography of Gurdon Saltonstall Hubbard. Lake Bluff, Illinois: Regnery Books. ISBN 0-89526-581-8.
