= Alexis Vasseur =

French-American mathematician

Alexis Vasseur is a French-American mathematician, specializing in fluid mechanics. He is currently the John T. Stuart III Professor at University of Texas at Austin. In 2015 he was named as a Fellow of the American Mathematical Society.

Vasseur earned bachelor's and master's degrees from the Ecole Normale Supérieure in 1993 and 1995, and completed his doctorate from Pierre and Marie Curie University in 1999 under the supervision of Yann Brenier. Before moving to Austin in 2003, he held a permanent research position at CNRS.
