= Nickolas Levasseur =

American politician

Member of the New Hampshire House of Representatives from the Hillsborough 11th district
- In office 2006–2014
- Succeeded by: Elizabeth Edwards

Personal details
- Party: Democratic

Nickolas J. Levasseur is a former Democratic member of the New Hampshire House of Representatives, representing the Hillsborough 11th District from 2006 to 2014.

He came under criticism in 2010 after comments about anime and Japan (and, by extension, relations with that country) on his Facebook page were circulated, in which he said that "anime is a prime example of why two nukes wasn't enough". He has since apologized.

Levasseur ran as a Democratic candidate for Hillsborough 16th District in the 2018 New Hampshire House of Representatives election. He lost the primary election, having gained 16.7% of the vote.
