= Watseka =

Potawatomi woman (c. 1810–1878)

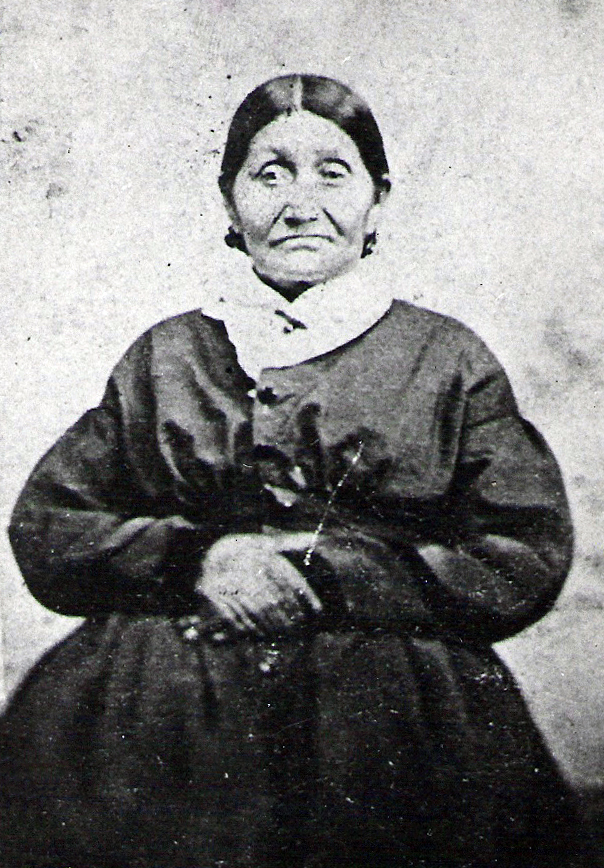
- Photograph of Watseka Bergeron (also known as Watchekee)
- Born: Watch-e-kee; Wa-che-ke; Waatchki c. 1810; Buncombe, Illinois
- Died: 1878; Council Bluffs
- Other names: Watseka Hubbard, Watseka LaVasseur, Watseka Bergeron, Josette Bergeron
- Citizenship: Potawatomi, Native American

Watseka or Watchekee (c. 1810–1878) was a Potawatomi Native American woman, born in Illinois, and named for the heroine of a Potawatomi legend. Her uncle was Tamin, the chief of the Kankakee Potawatomi Indians.

She was also known by the name of Josette (or Zozette) Bergeron.

== Early life ==
Watseka was born around 1810 at Buncombe, a Potawatomie village in Illinois. The village was presided over by Tamin, her uncle; by 1880, the site was called Concord. Her father was Shabbona, who was an ally of Tecumseh during The War of 1812; her mother was Monashki.

== Biography ==
Watseka's first husband, Gurdon Saltonstall Hubbard at age 28

At age 10 or 11, she became engaged to Gurdon Saltonstall Hubbard, whom she married in 1826 at age fourteen or fifteen. Hubbard and Watseka had a daughter who died in infancy. They mutually dissolved the union in 1826. Watseka married Noel Le Vasseur at age eighteen, and was described as "beautiful, intelligent and petite." She had three children with Le Vasseur, who learned to speak the Potawatomi language. In 1836, she left for Council Bluffs, Iowa, where her tribe had been removed in 1832 following the Treaty of Camp Tippecanoe. In 1840 Watseka married the French-Canadian Francis Xavier Bergeron.

Her biography per the Citizen Potawatomi Nation Cultural Heritage Center states: "French-Canadian Francis Xavier Bergeron arrived in the Great Lakes region as a young man where he met Watseka on one of her trips back to the region. In 1840, she received the Christian name Josette or Zozetta upon her baptism. She and Francis wed around that same time, but it was not her first marriage. Before marrying Bergeron, she had two other husbands named Noel LeVasseur and Gurdon Saltonstall Hubbard. She had four children: Jean Batiste, Catherine (Kate), Matilda and Charlie."

She is known for playing an "instrumental role" in Kankakee and Iroquois counties; and in particular, Bourbonnaise Grove, Illinois.

She died in Council Bluffs in 1878.

== Legacy ==
A city in East Central Illinois was named in her honor.

The Daughters of the American Revolution, Iroquois County Chapter was named in her honor.

Watseka and Bergeron's daughter Catherine (Kate) married Joseph L. Melott, a Frenchman; they were the principal founders of the community Mission Hill, now known as Wanette, Oklahoma.
