= Louis Levasseur =

Canadian scrivener (1671–1748)

Louis Levasseur (December 27, 1671 – June 3, 1748) was a scrivener and became lieutenant general of the admiralty court of Île Royale.

Levasseur was part of the bourgeoisie in Lower Canada and became secretary to Intendant Jean Bochart de Champigny at Quebec. He then was employed in France, where he was appointed scrivener. He came back to Canada as scrivener for Île Royale (Cape Breton Island) in 1716. Two years later, he was appointed lieutenant general of the admiralty court at the Fortress of Louisbourg in present-day Nova Scotia.
