= Noel Le Vasseur =

Canadian fur trader (1798–1879)

Noel Le Vasseur (December 25, 1798 – December 12, 1879) was a fur trader and merchant born in St. Michel d`Yamaska, Lower Canada and died in Bourbonnais Grove, Illinois.

In 1816, he became a voyageur. "John Jacob Astor furnished Mr. Le Vasseur with a stock of goods worth $6,000, which he used in trading with the Indians for furs." Le Vasseur travelled to Bunkum, Illinois in 1818, where he established a trading post for the American Fur Company. The post was placed under the supervision of Gurdon Saltonstall Hubbard, and when Hubbard left in 1827, Le Vasseur took over as his replacement. Le Vasseur also married Hubbard's ex-wife, Watseka (also called Watch-e-kee), the namesake of Watseka, Illinois He had three children with her, and learned to speak the Potawatomi language. In 1832, Watseka left to go west when the Potawatomie were removed from the area. He remained at the Bunkum post until 1835. In 1837, he married Ruth Bull of Danville, Illinois. Following her death in 1859, he married Elenor Franchere of Chicago, Illinois in 1861.

Le Vasseur and Hubbard arrived in the Bourbonnais area in 1830. Le Vasseur "bought a tract of land from Me-she-ke-ten-o", and "became the first permanent non-Native American settler of the area." When the Potawatomi left the Bourbonnais area in 1838, La Vasseur persuaded many Québécois to migrate to the region. These efforts have given him the epithet "Father of Kankakee."

His obituary stated that "In politics he was a Republican; he had no patience with the defenders of the slave power," noting that he was known both for his hospitality and his friendship with the leaders of the Potawotami tribe.
