= Vassar (disambiguation) =

Vassar College is a college in Poughkeepsie, New York, U.S.

Vassar may also refer to:

== People ==
- John Ellison Vassar (1813–1878), American lay preacher and missionary
- Matt Vassar, American professor of psychiatry and behavioral sciences
- Matthew Vassar (1792–1868), American brewer and merchant, founder of Vassar College
- Phil Vassar (born 1964), American country music artist
- Queenie Vassar (1870–1960), Scottish actress
- Vassar B. Carlton (1912–2005), American jurist
- Vassar Clements (1928–2005), American fiddler
- Vassar Miller (1924–1998), American writer and poet

== Places ==
- Vassar, Manitoba, Canada
- Vassar, Idaho, U.S.
- Vassar, Kansas, U.S.
- Vassar, Michigan, U.S.
- Vassar Township, Michigan, U.S.
- Vassar Glacier, Alaska, U.S.

== Other uses ==
- 1312 Vassar, an asteroid

== See also ==
- Vassar-Smith baronets
- Vassar Brothers Medical Center, in Poughkeepsie, New York, U.S.
