= Grace Christian Academy (Illinois) =

School in Kankakee, Illinois, United States

Location
- 2499 Waldron Rd. Kankakee, Kankakee County, Illinois, 60901; United States; 41.1034°N 87.8283°W

Information
- Other name: Grace
- Former name: Grace Baptist Academy
- Type: Association of Christian Schools International (ACSI)
- Motto: In Pursuit of Wisdom
- Established: 1973
- NCES School ID: 02024642
- Principal: Aaron Most
- Principal: Andrea Trivino
- Teaching staff: 20.3 (on an FTE basis) (2021–22)
- Grades: 3 year olds - 12th Grade
- Enrollment: 228 (2021–22)
- Student to teacher ratio: 9.6
- Color
- Athletics conference: Illinois High School Association; River Valley Conference (Illinois)
- Team name: Crusaders
- Website: www.gracecrusaders.org

Grace Christian Academy (GCA) is an accredited Preschool-12th grade private, evangelical, Christian school located in Kankakee, Illinois.

GCA serves students in Kankakee County, Iroquois County, and Will County.

== History ==
In 1973, Grace Baptist Church in Kankakee, Illinois, founded Grace Baptist Academy as a school for kindergarten through sixth grade. In 1975 the academy expanded to serve junior high students, and in 1977, added high school classes. It is a private, non-profit corporation.

In the summer of 1978, Grace Baptist Church broke ground on a new educational annex, which was completed and dedicated in May 1979. As the school grew, the church purchased additional land and added more classroom space.

In December 2012, Grace Baptist Academy changed its name to Grace Christian Academy, "to better represent the students and faculty made up of multiple Christian denominations".

In January 2020, GCA was granted accreditation through the Association of Christian Schools International.

Until the beginning of the 2020 school year, the school was part of the Illinois Christian Conference Association for athletic competitions. In the fall of 2020, GCA became affiliated with the Illinois High School Association (IHSA) for sports and other extra-curricular activities. GCA joined the River Valley Conference for athletic competitions, effective for the 2021 school year.

In 2023-24, Grace Christian Academy celebrated its 50th anniversary. The school commemorated five decades of providing Christ-centered education, emphasizing wisdom, character, and integrity. Principal Aaron Most highlighted the school's ongoing commitment to its founding principles of grace and Christian values. The celebration acknowledged the contributions of past leaders and the enduring support from the school community, marking a significant milestone in GCA's history.

== Notable alumni ==
- Don Bacon — Republican member of the United States House of Representatives, 2nd congressional district of Nebraska since 2017; retired from the United States Air Force as a Brigadier General
