= Jane Byrne Interchange =

Highway interchange in Chicago

- Circle Interchange
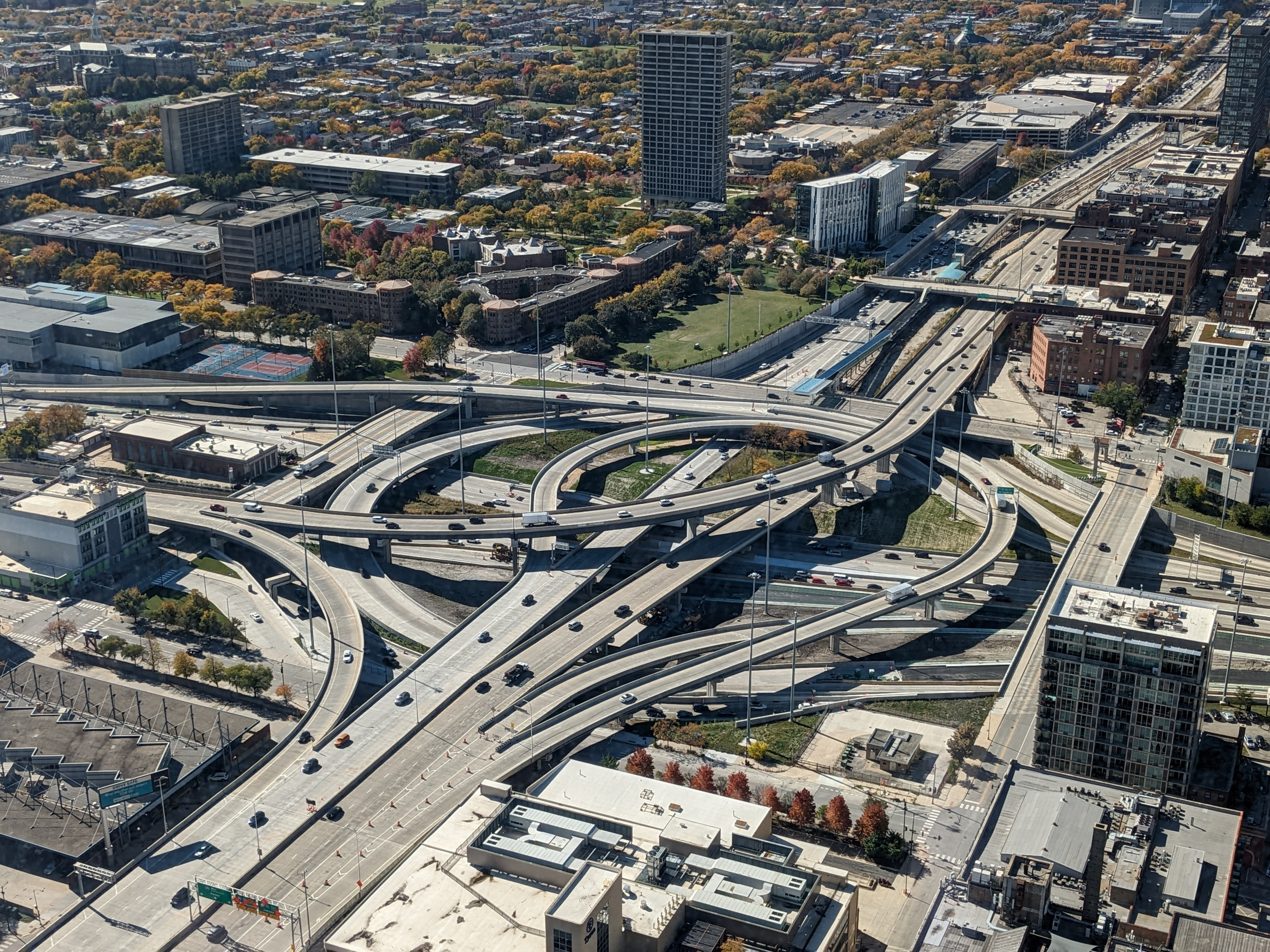
- View of the interchange from the BMO Tower in October 2022
- Interactive map of Jane Byrne Interchange

Location
- Chicago, Illinois
- Coordinates: 41°52′32″N 87°38′44″W
- Roads at junction: I-90 I-94; I-290 IL 110 (CKC)

Construction
- Opened: 1960s; 65 years ago
- Maintained by: IDOT

The Jane Byrne Interchange (until 2014, Circle Interchange) is a major freeway interchange near downtown Chicago, Illinois. It is the junction between the Dan Ryan, Kennedy and Eisenhower Expressways (I-90/I-94 and I-290), and Ida B. Wells Drive. In a dedication ceremony held on August 29, 2014, the interchange was renamed in honor of former Chicago mayor Jane M. Byrne (in office, 1979–1983).

First developed in the late 1950s and 1960s, over time the interchange in its original configuration became notorious for traffic jams. In 2004, it was rated as the country's third-worst traffic bottleneck, with approximately 400,000 vehicles using it per day. In a 2010 study of freight congestion (truck speed and travel time), the U.S. Department of Transportation ranked this section of I-290 as having the worst congestion in the United States. This led to an $800 million reconfiguration begun in 2013 and completed in December 2022.

== Design ==
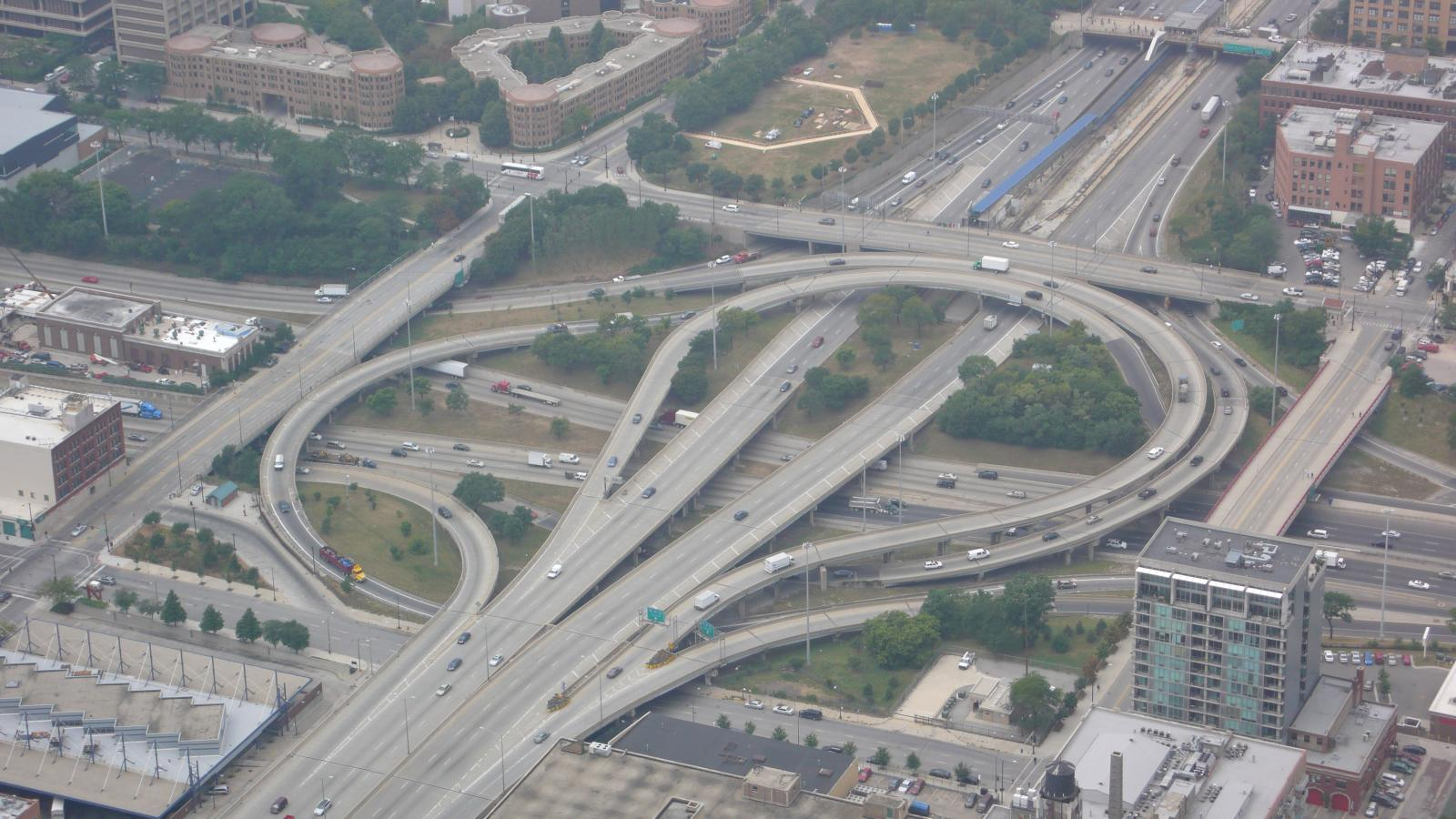
Original configuration

This interchange as originally built was an asymmetrical turbine interchange, with each of the four mainlines having a single entrance and exit serving both directions of the crossing highway. It did not use the quadruple-decker architecture commonly associated with stack interchanges. Instead, it had a flattened layout, using the long, curving ramps to circumnavigate the crossing of the mainlines. This resulted in fewer tall bridges and gave the interchange its distinctive "circle" appearance. Since 2016, it has had a three-level stack in the center due to the realignment of the north-to-west ramp.

Both I-90/I-94 and I-290/Ida B. Wells Drive have four lanes in each direction at this interchange (three lanes prior to December 2022). Most of the ramps leading to and from the freeways are one lane wide, except for the ramps from eastbound I-290 to I-90/94 in both directions and the ramp from I-90/94 westbound/Dan Ryan Expressway to I-290; these ramps are two lanes wide.

This interchange centers on Ida B. Wells Drive (the east–west surface street that is the continuation of the Eisenhower Expressway beyond its terminus several blocks east of the interchange) and extends roughly from Halsted Street on the west to Jefferson Street on the east.

The tracks of the Chicago Transit Authority Blue Line 'L' train pass directly underneath the center of the interchange, running in an east–west direction, as they transition from surface operation in the median of the Eisenhower Expressway, to a subway to the east of the Interchange. This complicates where support columns could be located in any future construction at this interchange.

== History ==
Originally known as the Congress Interchange and changed to Circle Interchange in 1964, it was built in the late 1950s and early 1960s, at the same time as the construction of the Kennedy Expressway.

The University of Illinois Chicago is to the southwest of the interchange. When the campus opened in 1965, it was called the University of Illinois at Chicago Circle, making it the only university in the world known to be named after a freeway interchange.

Due to its congestion, the May 2008 issue of Popular Mechanics listed this interchange among their list of the 10 Pieces of U.S. Infrastructure We Must Fix Now.

In a dedication ceremony held on August 29, 2014, this interchange, formerly called the Circle Interchange, was renamed the Jane Byrne Interchange in honor of former Chicago Mayor Jane M. Byrne (1979–1983). The market's radio and television traffic reporting services immediately instituted the interchange's new name, although many went with a dual reference of the "Jane Byrne–Circle Interchange" during a transition period until the services updated their maps and road signage was changed to reflect the new name, to avert confusion.

=== Reconstruction project ===
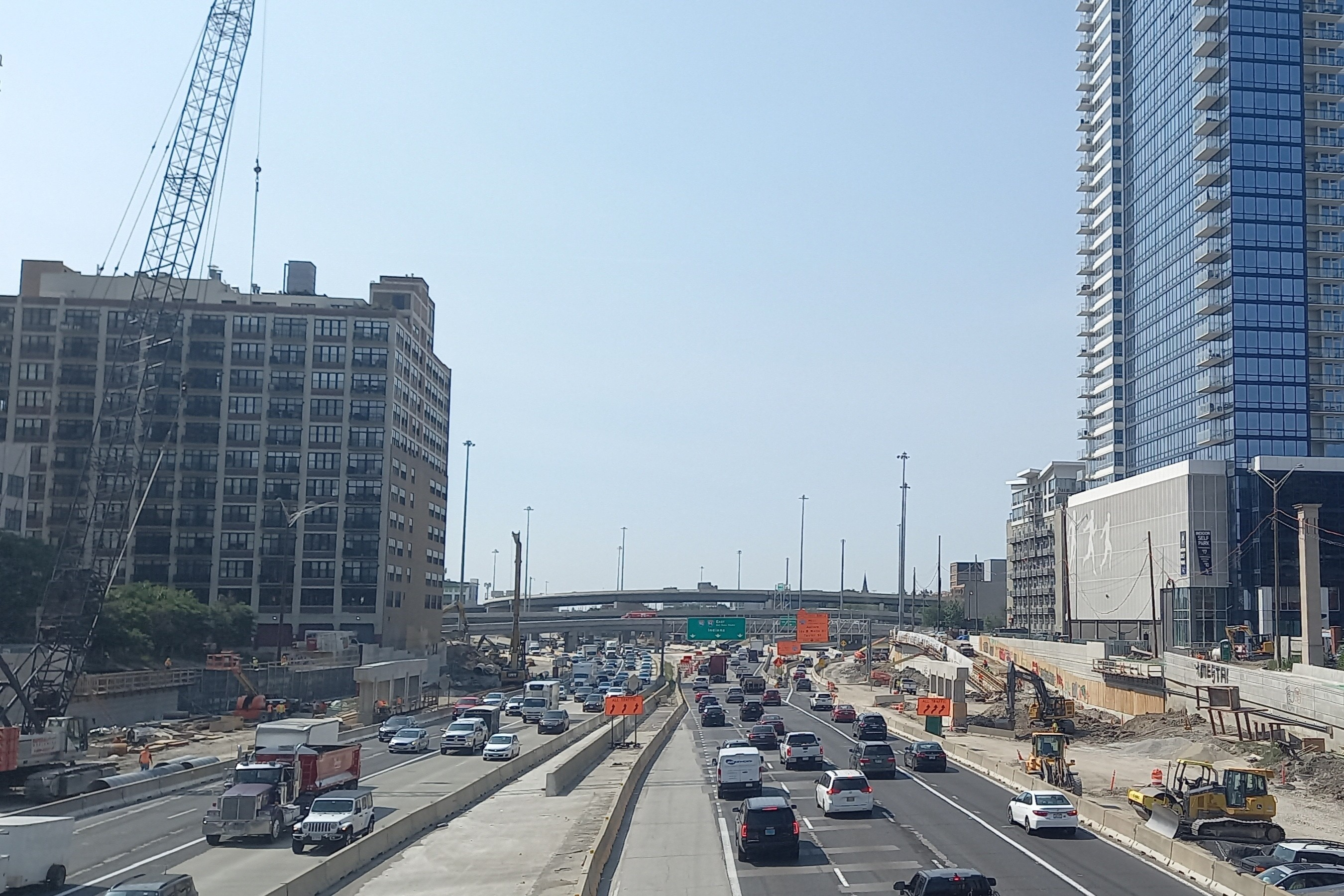
Construction on the Kennedy Expressway, with the interchange in the background (August 2021)

In August 2012, the Illinois Department of Transportation (IDOT) began the planning and design phases for the potential rehabilitation of this interchange. It established a project web site, which was used to schedule public meetings.

On April 3, 2013, the Chicago Tribune featured a front-page article on the estimated $420 million project, which was slated to take four years. The project began in late 2013. The interchange, as well as a series of overpasses surrounding it, would receive a complete overhaul, including the addition of a flyover ramp from the northbound Dan Ryan (westbound I-90/I-94) to westbound I-290. It also sought to move the Taylor Street exit (from eastbound I-90/I-94 traffic) north.

The northwest flyover of the Jane Byrne Interchange opened on December 4, 2016, after which the old ramp was closed and demolished. Several more ramps, as well as the expressways themselves, were rebuilt during the course of the project. One ramp that connects from northbound Dan Ryan to eastbound Ida B. Wells was closed from the spring of 2014 to September 7, 2019. On the same day, the second lane of the flyover ramp, as well as the Morgan Street off-ramp, opened.

Delays and increasing costs led to a final completion date of December 16, 2022, at which time all lanes and ramps were opened to motorists. The estimated final cost of the reconstruction was $804.6 million. IDOT stated they expected a 50% reduction in traffic delays as a result of the project's conclusion.

The interchange after reconstruction

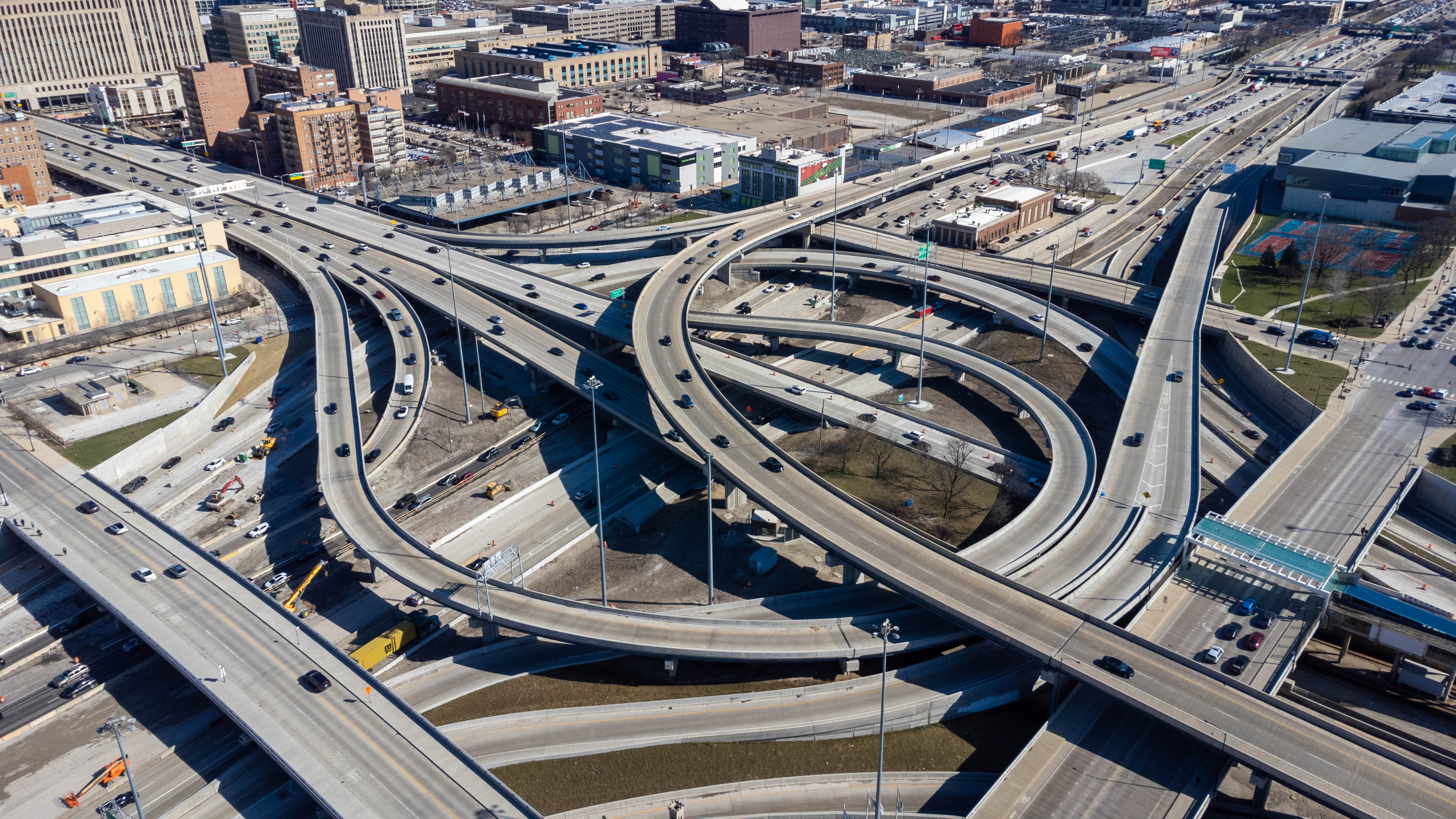
