= Interstate 294 =

Highway in Illinois

Interstate 294 Toll
- Tri-State Tollway
- I-294 highlighted in red

Route information
- Auxiliary route of I-94
- Maintained by ISTHA
- Length: 53.45 mi (86.02 km)
- Existed: 1958 –present
- History: Completed December 23, 1958

Major junctions
- South end: I-80 / I-94 / IL 394 in Lansing
- I-80 in Hazel Crest; I-57 in Blue Island; I-55 in Indian Head Park; I-88 Toll / I-290 / IL 110 (CKC) in Hillside; I-490 in Franklin Park; I-90 Toll / I-190 in Rosemont
- North end: I-94 Toll / Lake Cook Road in Deerfield

Location
- Country: United States
- State: Illinois
- Counties: Cook

Highway system
- Illinois State Highway System; Interstate; US; State; Tollways; Scenic
← I-290	→ IL 336

Interstate 294 (I-294) is a tolled auxiliary Interstate Highway in the northeastern part of the U.S. state of Illinois. Forming the southern portion of the Tri-State Tollway in Illinois, I-294 runs from South Holland at I-80/I-94 and Illinois Route 394 (IL 394) to Northbrook at I-94. I-294 is 53.42 miles (85.97 km) long; 5.32 miles (8.56 km) are shared with I-80. It serves as a bypass around the city of Chicago.

== Route description ==
I-294 begins at the interchange between I-94, I-80, and IL 394 in Lansing. I-94 splits off toward Chicago while I-80/I-294 heads west as an eight-lane tollway and crosses above a railroad track and Thorn Creek in Thornton. The highway crosses under the Chicago Southland Lincoln Oasis, Chicago Road, another railroad track, and State Street through residential areas. I-80/I-294 is between the Thornton Quarry on an elevated area before crossing the quarry on a bridge and passing under another railroad track. The highway then enters East Hazel Crest and has a cloverleaf interchange with IL 1 (Halsted Street) and widens to 10 lanes. Then, I-80/I-294 reenters the residential areas and center cross over Center Avenue, the Canadian National Railway Chicago Subdivision, the Metra Electric, and the Dixie Highway. After crossing under 171st Street, I-80 splits off and heads toward Des Moines, Iowa, and I-294 narrows to eight lanes in Hazel Crest.

After the I-80 split, I-294 heads north and enters Markham. It crosses under 167th Street and goes through the 163rd Street toll plaza. I-294 has a cloverleaf interchange with US Route 6 (US 6; 159th Street) and turns northwest toward an incomplete interchange with I-57. I-294 then enters Posen and has a partial interchange with IL 83 (147th Street). I-294 turns west to cross the Rock Island District and Kedzie Avenue. I-294 turns northwest, and enters Midlothian. It crosses over South Claire Boulevard, Pulaski Road, the Midlothian Turnpike, 135th Street, and the Calumet River. I-294 has an interchange with IL 50 and IL 83 (Cicero Avenue) with a northbound exit and southbound entrance via 127th Street in Alsip. It then passes by warehouses and crosses over Ridgeland Avenue, 115th Street, 111th Street, 107th Street, the tracks of the SouthWest Service, Southwest Highway, Stony Creek, all while entering Worth, Chicago Ridge, and Bridgeview. The tollway enters Justice and has another interchange with US 12/US 20 (95th Street) and IL 43 (Harlem Avenue). I-294 then crosses over 87th Street and Roberts Road. It then goes through the 82nd/83rd street toll plaza. It crosses over 88th Avenue and has an interchange with IL 171 (Archer Avenue), US 45, US 12, and US 20 (La Grange Road). I-294 then crosses the Canadian National Railway Joliet Subdivision, the Illinois and Michigan Canal, the Chicago Sanitary and Ship Canal, the Des Plaines River, the BNSF Railway Chillicothe Subdivision, Santa Fe Drive, and an access road on the Mile-Long Bridge. I-294 then enters Indian Head Park and has an interchange with I-55 and Joliet Road and turns north.

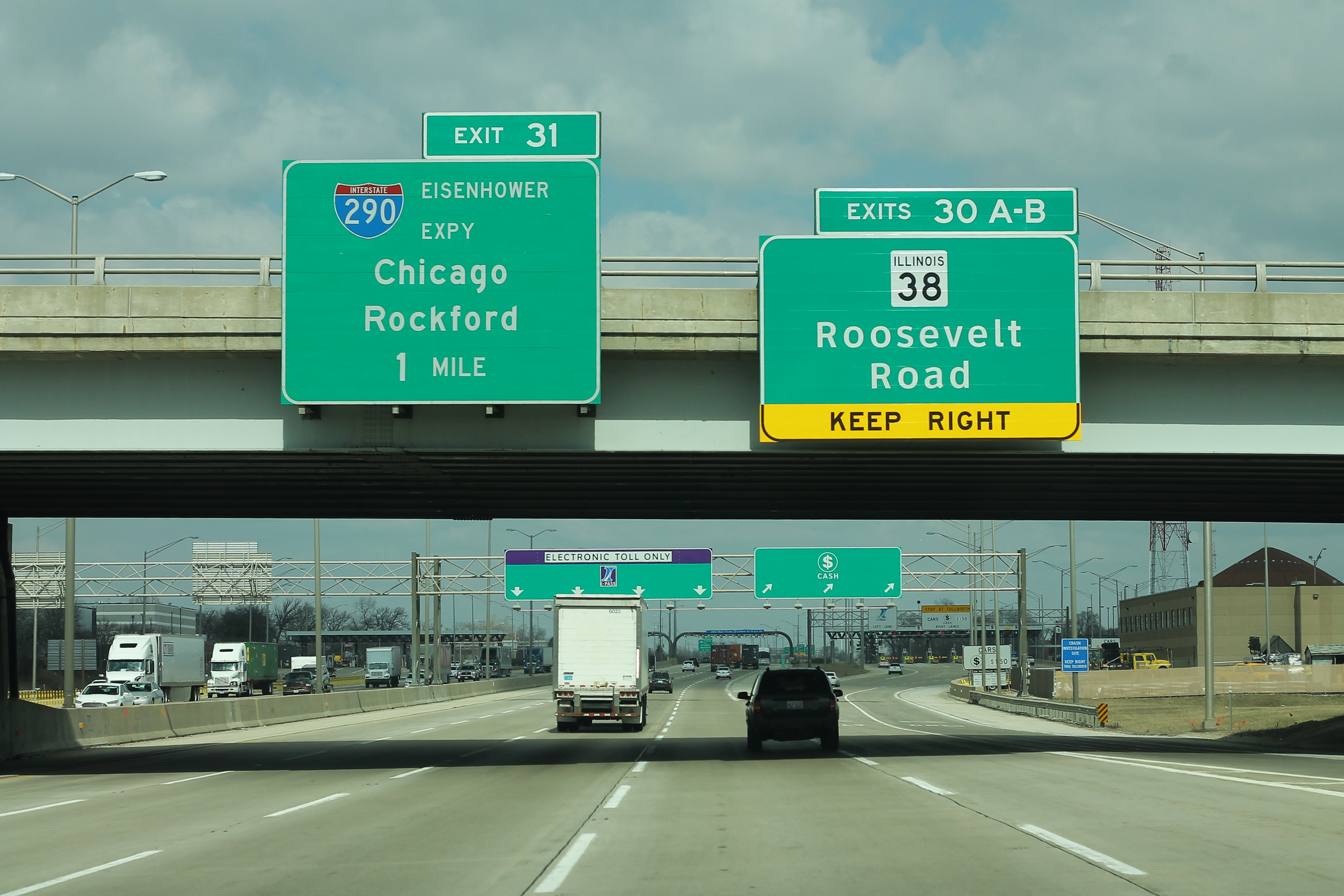
I-294 northbound approaching the Cermak Road toll plaza and Hillside Strangler, 2018

I-294 then passes under Plainfield Road, crosses a small creek, crosses next to the Hinsdale Oasis, and enters Hinsdale. I-294 passes under 55th Street, 47th Street, the BNSF Railway Line, and a trail. I-294 then has a cloverleaf interchange with US 34 and enters Oak Brook. I-294 crosses under 31st Street and Cermak Road. I-294 goes through the Cermak Road toll plaza and the Hillside Strangler. It crosses over IL 38 (Roosevelt Road) after the plaza. It enters Hillside and crosses over I-88 and I-290. It then crosses under Saint Charles Road, enters Berkeley, and crosses the Union Pacific West Line. I-294 enters Northlake and crosses over US 20 (Lake Street), and IL 64 (North Avenue). It then has a southbound exit with County Line Road. After crossing over Grand Avenue, I-294 has a partial interchange with I-490 while taking the Grand Avenue Curve, turning northeast as it approaches O'Hare International Airport. I-294 crosses over the Union Pacific New Line and Wolf Road, briefly enters Bensenville, crosses over the Bensenville Railyard of the Canadian Pacific Railway and Milwaukee District West Line, and US 12/US 45 (Mannheim Road), enters Schiller Park, crosses under the former O'Hare Oasis, and passes by the Irving Park toll plaza (for southbound lanes). It passes through the Chicago Panhandle, which connects O'Hare to the rest of the city. It then enters Rosemont, crossing under Balmoral Avenue, I-190 and the Blue Line, and crossing over I-90, having an interchange with each of the three previously mentioned roadways.

I-294 enters Des Plaines, passing by the Touhy Avenue toll plaza (for northbound lanes), and crosses over River Road. It then has a partial interchange with Touhy Avenue. I-294 crosses the Des Plaines River and the Union Pacific Northwest Line, and enters Park Ridge. I-294 has a partial interchange with US 14 (Dempster Street), enters Glenview, and crosses over Northwest Highway and Ballard Road. It has another partial interchange with IL 58 and crosses over the Union Pacific New Line, Central Avenue, IL 21 (Milwaukee Avenue), and Lake Avenue. It has a diamond interchange with Willow Road and enters Northbrook. It crosses under Sanders Road and IL 68 (Dundee Road) and crosses over Sanders Road. It enters Deerfield and terminates at a partial interchange with I-94 just south of Lake-Cook Road, the county line, to which I-294 has full access.

== History ==
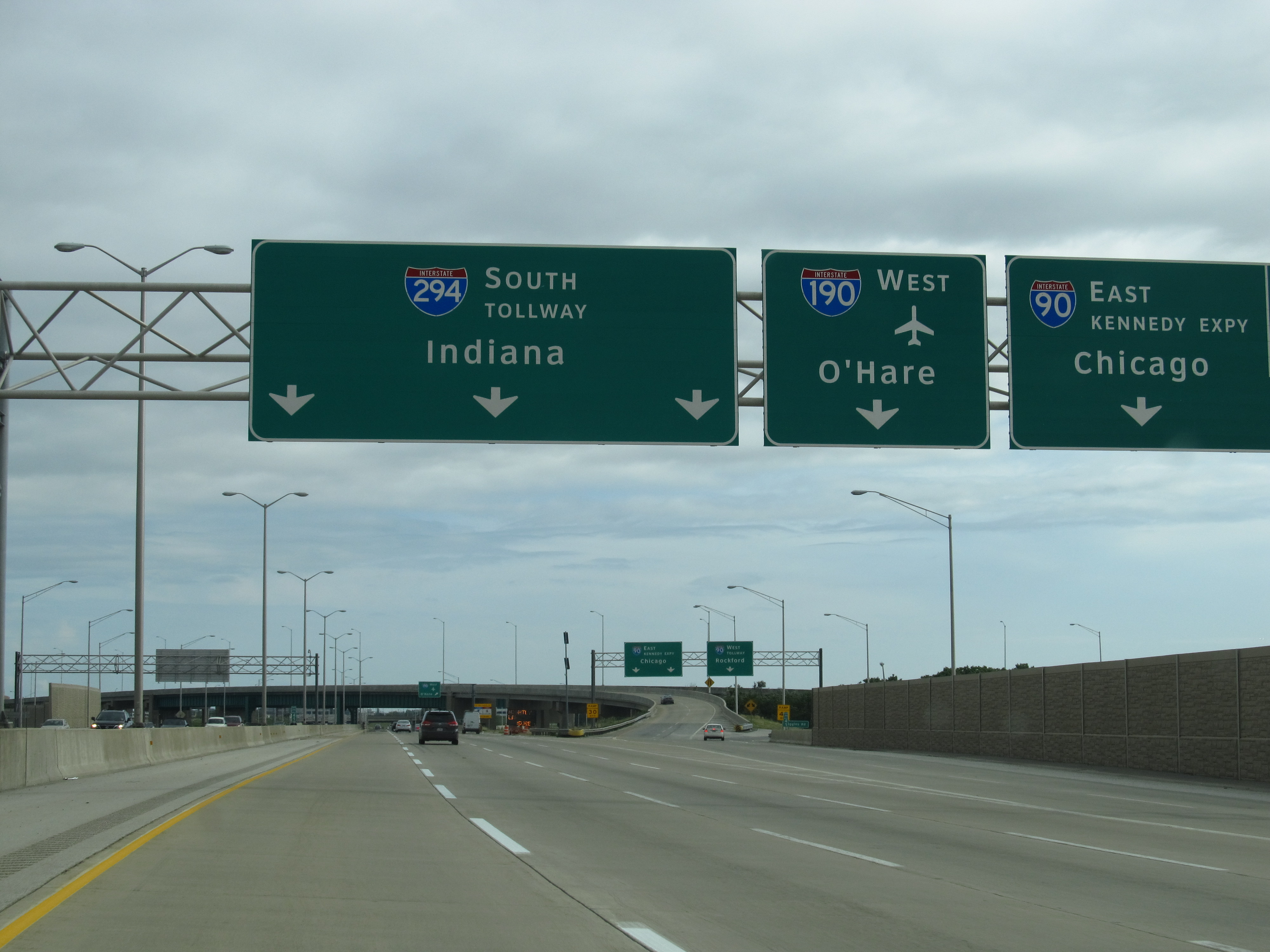
I-294 southbound, at the intersection with I-90 near O'Hare

The portion of the Borman Expressway that was completed from Gary westward and the Kingery Expressway were originally designated as I-80, I-90, and I-294 from shortly after the Interstate Highway program was enacted until about 1965 when the connection between the Borman and the Indiana Toll Road was completed, and I-90 was swapped with I-94 west of that junction (and east of where those routes share the same road in Chicago), cutting back I-294 to its current south terminus (eliminating the Indiana part of I-294).

I-294 was constructed largely before the growth and maturation of the suburbs that run along the corridor. As a result, the vast majority of the interchanges are partial or were configured to have entrance ramps feeding the toll plazas. Long gaps between exit ramps are common, the 6.5-mile (10.5 km) gap between Cicero Avenue (IL 50/IL 83) and 95th Street (US 12/US 20) being one of the more notable ones. Partial interchanges are located at Roosevelt Road (IL 38; northbound exit, southbound entrance), Irving Park Road (IL 19) (southbound exit, northbound entrance), Touhy Avenue (northbound exit, southbound entrance), Dempster Street (US 14; northbound exit, southbound entrance), and Golf Road (IL 58; southbound exit, northbound entrance).

From 1992 to 1993, the central portion of I-294 between Balmoral Avenue and 95th Street was widened to eight lanes. As part of the project, the 79th Street exit was removed while the 75th Street/Willow Springs Road exit was constructed. It also caused southbound 83rd Street Toll Plaza to relocate north. Several former partial interchanges have been converted to full interchanges, with automated toll collection facilities on the new ramps, such as at 159th Street (US 6; northbound on and southbound off added) and 95th Street (US 12/US 20; southbound on and northbound off added). Between 2006 and 2009, the southern and northern portions of I-294 (IL-394 to 95th Street and I-90 to Lake Cook Road respectively) were fully reconstructed and expanded, bringing the entire highway up to eight lanes.

The Illinois State Toll Highway Authority (ISTHA) and the Illinois Department of Transportation (IDOT) are partnering to construct a new interchange to connect I-294 to I-57. The primary interchange connections between I-294 and I-57 were completed in 2014, while the remaining ramps except for northbound I-57 to southbound I-294 and northbound I-294 to southbound I-57 were completed on September 11, 2022.

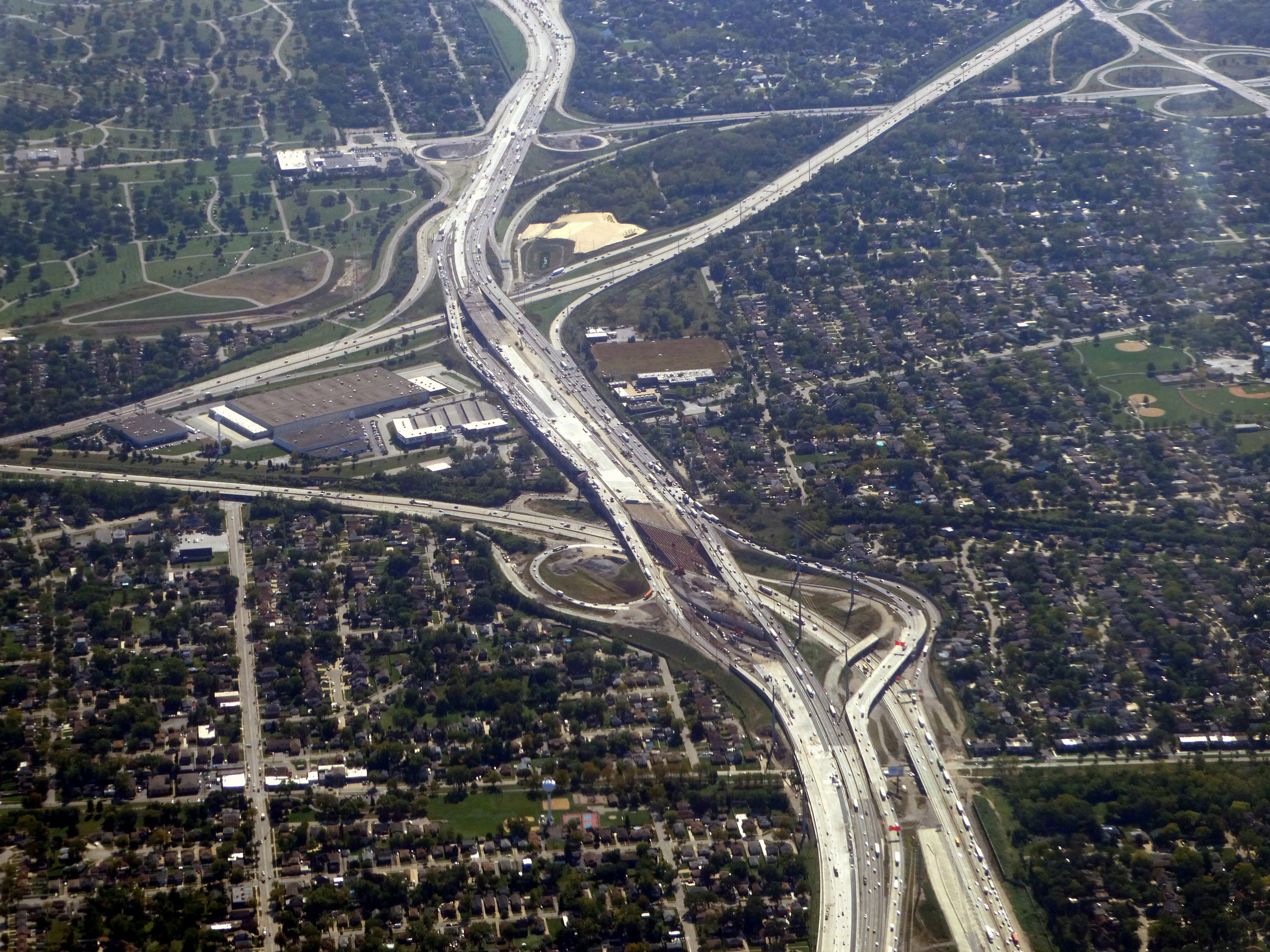
Construction at the Hillside Strangler, 2024

The central portion of I-294 between Balmoral Avenue and 95th Street is currently being reconstructed and widened to a five/six-lane cross-section, with the inside shoulder being a flex lane that can be used during emergencies or heavy congestion. The work also includes reconfiguring the interchange with I-88/I-290, Ogden Avenue (US 34), I-55, adding new ramps like I-490, County Line Road, and Cork Avenue/88th Avenue, and improving many bridges like the Mile Long Bridge. It required the demolition of the Hinsdale Oasis. The entire project is scheduled to be completed in 2027.

About the construction of the central portion of I-294, the ramp from I-294 north to I-290 west was a heavily congested ramp for all drivers. The former one-lane ramp created backups for all drivers, especially truck drivers. On November 23, 2025, a new two-lane "Fly under" ramp opened to traffic. The new ramp is supposed to cut travel times by 70%.

== Exit list ==
The entire route is in Cook County.

Location	mi	km	Exit	Destinations	Notes
Lansing	0.00	0.00		I-80 east / I-94 east / US 6 east (Kingery Expressway) – Indiana	Southern terminus; southern end of I-80 concurrency; southern end of US 6 concurrency (northbound lanes only)
Lansing	0.00	0.00	161	US 6 west / IL 83 (Torrence Avenue)	Northern end of US 6 concurrency (northbound lanes only); exit number follows I-80; no southbound entrance; only free exit northbound
Lansing–Thornton Township line	0.00	0.00	0	I-94 west (Bishop Ford Freeway) – Chicago IL 394 south (Calumet Expressway) – Danville	Southbound exit and northbound entrance; southern terminus of Tri-State Tollway; I-94 exit 74B
South Holland	0.90	1.45	Chicago Southland Lincoln Oasis		
East Hazel Crest	2.83	4.55	2	IL 1 (Halsted Street)	Toll on northbound exit and southbound entrance; signed as exits 2A (north) and 2B (south)
East Hazel Crest	4.33	6.97	4	Dixie Highway	Southbound exit and northbound entrance
Hazel Crest	5.26	8.47	5	I-80 west to I-57 south – Iowa	Northern end of I-80 concurrency; I-80 exit 155
Hazel Crest	5.81	9.35	163rd Street Toll Plaza		
Markham–Harvey line	6.48	10.43	6	US 6 (159th Street)	Toll on southbound exit and northbound entrance; signed as exits 6A (east) and 6B (west)
Midlothian	7.75	12.47	7	I-57 to I-80 west / IL 83 (147th Street / Sibley Boulevard) – Chicago, Memphis	Toll on southbound exit and northbound exit ramps; signed as exits 7A (north) and 7B (south) southbound; no northbound exit to I-57 south; no southbound entrance from I-57 north; I-57 exit 349
Midlothian	8.33	13.41	8	IL 83 (147th Street / Sibley Boulevard)	Toll on both sides; southbound exit and northbound entrance; former exit 9
Alsip	12.13	19.52	12	IL 50 (Cicero Avenue) / IL 83 (127th Street)	Signed as exits 12A (south) and 12B (north)
Hickory Hills	17.63	28.37	17	US 12 / US 20 (95th Street) / 76th Avenue	Toll on northbound exit and southbound entrance; signed as exits 17A (east) and 17B (west) southbound; no northbound signage for 76th Avenue
Hickory Hills	19.37	31.17	83rd Street Toll Plaza (northbound)		
Hickory Hills	19.78	31.83	82nd Street Toll Plaza (southbound)		
Justice	20.04	32.25	20	To IL 171 (Archer Avenue) / 88th Avenue / Cork Avenue	Future interchange; will be a northbound exit and southbound entrance
Justice	20.45	32.91	—	US 12 / US 20 / US 45 (La Grange Road) / IL 171 (Archer Avenue)	Southbound entrance only as of 2022, northbound entrance being constructed
Des Plaines River	21.20– 21.88	34.12– 35.21	Mile-Long Bridge		
Hodgkins	22.04– 22.28	35.47– 35.86	22	75th Street / Willow Springs Road	Toll on southbound exit and northbound entrance
Indian Head Park	23.20– 24.24	37.34– 39.01	23	I-55 (Stevenson Expressway) – Chicago, St. Louis; Historic US 66 (Joliet Road)	Signed as exits 23A (north) and 23B (south) northbound; no southbound entrance from I-55 north; I-55 exit 277; exit southbound not numbered until 2025; southbound exit and northbound entrance provide access from and to Joliet Road; toll on southbound exit and northbound entrance
Indian Head Park	23.42	37.69	23B	Wolf Road	Northbound exit and southbound entrance
Hinsdale	25.13	40.44	Hinsdale Oasis (gas station only)		
Western Springs	27.57	44.37	27	US 34 (Ogden Avenue)	Signed as exits 27A (east) and 27B (west)
Oak Brook	29.40	47.31	29	I-88 Toll west / IL 110 (CKC) west (Ronald Reagan Memorial Tollway) – Aurora	Northbound exit and southbound entrance; I-88 exit 138
Oak Brook	29.63	47.68	29	Cermak Road (22nd Street)	Southbound exit and northbound entrance
Oak Brook	30.00	48.28	Cermak Road Toll Plaza		
Hillside	30.64	49.31	30	IL 38 (Roosevelt Road)	Northbound exit and southbound entrance; signed as exits 30A (east) and 30B (west)
Hillside	31.00	49.89	—	I-290 east / IL 110 (CKC) east (Eisenhower Expressway) – Chicago	Northbound exit and southbound entrance; I-290 exit 15A
Hillside	31.00	49.89	31A	I-88 Toll west / IL 110 (CKC) west (Ronald Reagan Memorial Tollway) – Aurora	Southbound exit and northbound entrance; I-88 exit 139
Berkeley	31.75	51.10	31	I-290 west to US 20 / IL 64 – Rockford	Northbound exit and southbound entrance; I-290 exit 15A
Berkeley	31.75	51.10	31B	I-290 east / IL 110 (CKC) east (Eisenhower Expressway) – Chicago	Southbound exit and northbound entrance; I-290 exit 15B
Northlake	33.70	54.23	33	I-290 west to US 20 west / IL 64 west – Rockford	Southbound exit and northbound entrance; I-290 exit 13A
Franklin Park	34.56	55.62	34	County Line Road to US 20 west / IL 64 east	Southbound exit only; opened on December 15, 2025
Franklin Park	35.85	57.69	35	I-490 Toll north (Western O'Hare Beltway) – Des Plaines, Rockford	Southern terminus of I-490; northbound exit and southbound entrance; exit opened on October 24, 2026
Schiller Park	37.96	61.09	O'Hare Oasis (gas station only)		
Schiller Park	38.41	61.81	38	IL 19 (Irving Park Road)	Southbound exit and northbound entrance; signed as exits 38A (east) and 38B (west)
Schiller Park	38.89	62.59	Irving Park Toll Plaza (southbound)		
Rosemont	39.91	64.23	39	Balmoral Avenue	Toll on northbound exit ramp; northbound exit and southbound entrance
Rosemont	40.42	65.05	40A	I-190 west (Kennedy Expressway) / River Road – O'Hare	Toll on exit ramps; signed as exit 40 northbound; I-190 exits 1C-D; northbound exit to River Road only
Rosemont	40.88	65.79	40B	I-90 Toll (Kennedy Expressway / Jane Addams Memorial Tollway) – Chicago, Rockford	Signed as exit 40 northbound; I-90 exits 77 and 79C
Park Ridge	41.64	67.01	Touhy Avenue Toll Plaza (northbound)		
Park Ridge	42.28	68.04	42	Touhy Avenue / Des Plaines River Road	Northbound exit and southbound entrance; signed as exits 42A (east) and 42B (west)
Des Plaines	44.32	71.33	44	US 14 (Dempster Street)	Northbound exit and southbound entrance; signed as exits 44A (east) and 44B (west)
Des Plaines	45.34	72.97	45	IL 58 (Golf Road)	Toll on southbound exit and northbound entrance
Glenview	49.02	78.89	48	Willow Road	Toll on southbound exit and northbound entrance
Northbrook	52.75	84.89	52	Lake Cook Road	Northbound exit and southbound entrance
Northbrook	52.75	84.89	—	I-94 Toll west (Tri-State Tollway north) – Wisconsin	Northern terminus; northbound exit and southbound entrance; I-94 exit 25B
1.000 mi = 1.609 km; 1.000 km = 0.621 mi: Concurrency terminus; Electronic toll collection; Incomplete access; Unopened
