= Kennedy Expressway =

Highway in Chicago, Illinois, US

- John F. Kennedy Expressway

Route information
- Maintained by IDOT
- Length: 17.80 mi (28.65 km)
- Existed: 1960–present
- Component highways: I-190 in O'Hare; I-90 from O'Hare to Jane Byrne Interchange; I-94 from Irving Park to Jane Byrne Interchange

Major junctions
- West end: O'Hare International Airport in Chicago
- US 12 / US 45 in Chicago I-294 Toll in Rosemont I-90 Toll / I-190 in Chicago; IL 171 in Chicago; IL 43 in Chicago; I-94 in Chicago; IL 19 in Chicago; IL 64 in Chicago
- East end: I-90 / I-94 / I-290 / IL 110 (CKC) in Chicago

Location
- Country: United States
- State: Illinois

Highway system
- Interstate Highway System; Main; Auxiliary; Suffixed; Business; Future; Illinois State Highway System; Interstate; US; State; Tollways; Scenic

The John F. Kennedy Expressway is a nearly 18-mile-long (29 km) freeway in Chicago, Illinois, United States. Portions of the freeway carry I-190, I-90 and I-94. The freeway runs in a southeast–northwest direction between the central city neighborhood of the West Loop and O'Hare International Airport. The highway was named in commemoration of 35th US President John F. Kennedy. It conforms to the Chicago-area term of using the word expressway for an Interstate Highway without tolls. The Kennedy's official endpoints are the Jane Byrne Interchange with Interstate 290 (Eisenhower Expressway/Ida B. Wells Drive) and the Dan Ryan Expressway (also I-90/94) at the east end, and the O'Hare Airport terminals at the west end. I-190 runs from the western terminus at O'Hare Airport for 3.07 miles (4.94 km), where it meets I-90 and runs a further 6.29 miles (10.12 km), before joining with I-94 for the final 8.44 miles (13.58 km).

Traveling eastbound from O'Hare, the Kennedy interchanges with the eastern terminus of the Jane Addams Memorial Tollway (I-90) and with the Tri-State Tollway (I-294) at a complex junction just west of Illinois Route 171 (IL 171, Cumberland Avenue). The Kennedy later merges with the southern end of the Edens Expressway (I-94) at Montrose Avenue; the Kennedy (at this point both I-90 and I-94) then turns south to its junction with the Dan Ryan and Eisenhower Expressways and Ida B. Wells Drive at the Jane Byrne Interchange in downtown Chicago.

With up to 327,000 vehicles traveling on the Kennedy daily, the Kennedy and its South Side extension, the Dan Ryan, are the busiest roads in the Midwest.

== History ==
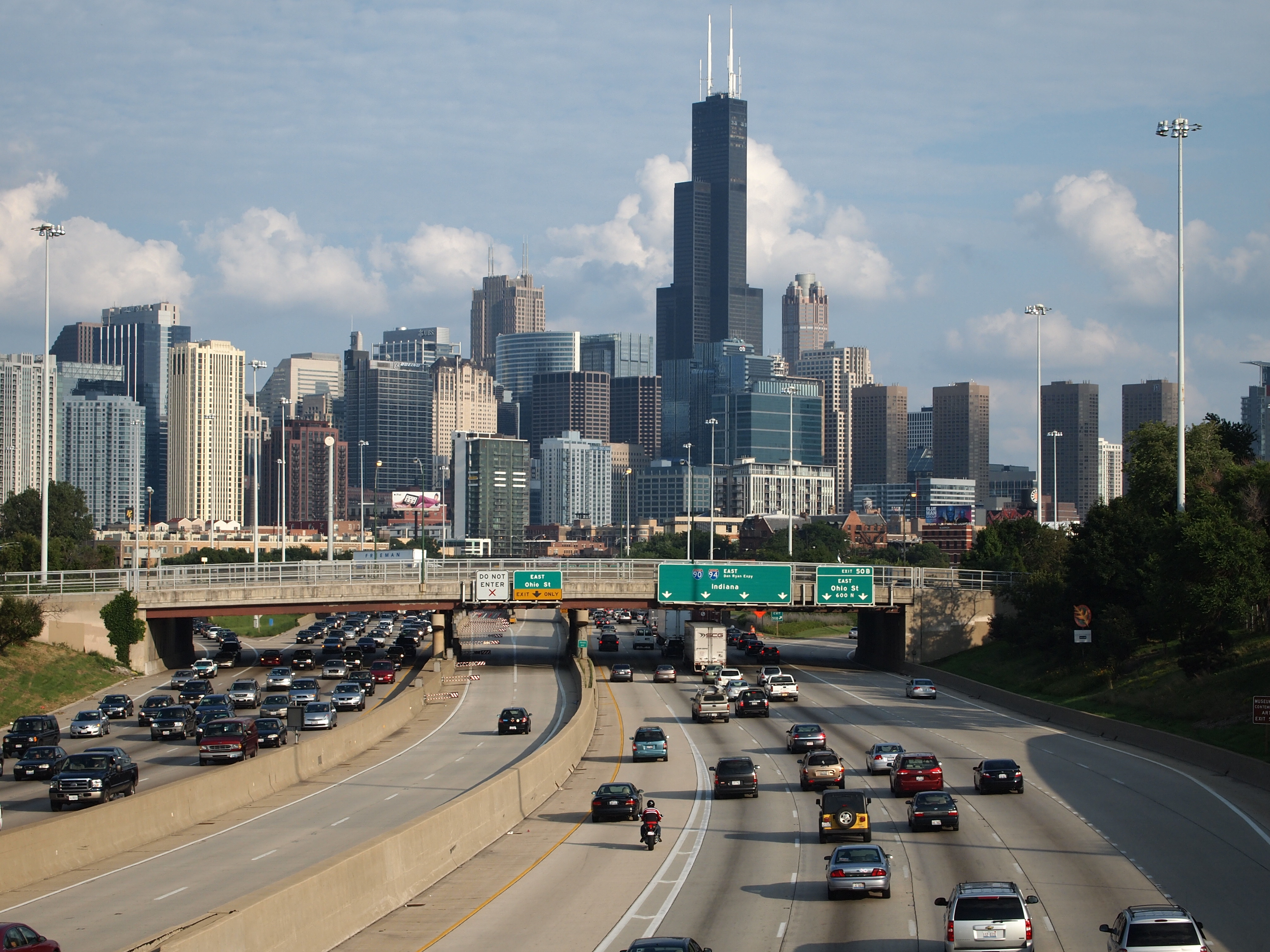
An eastbound view of the Kennedy Expressway heading toward downtown Chicago

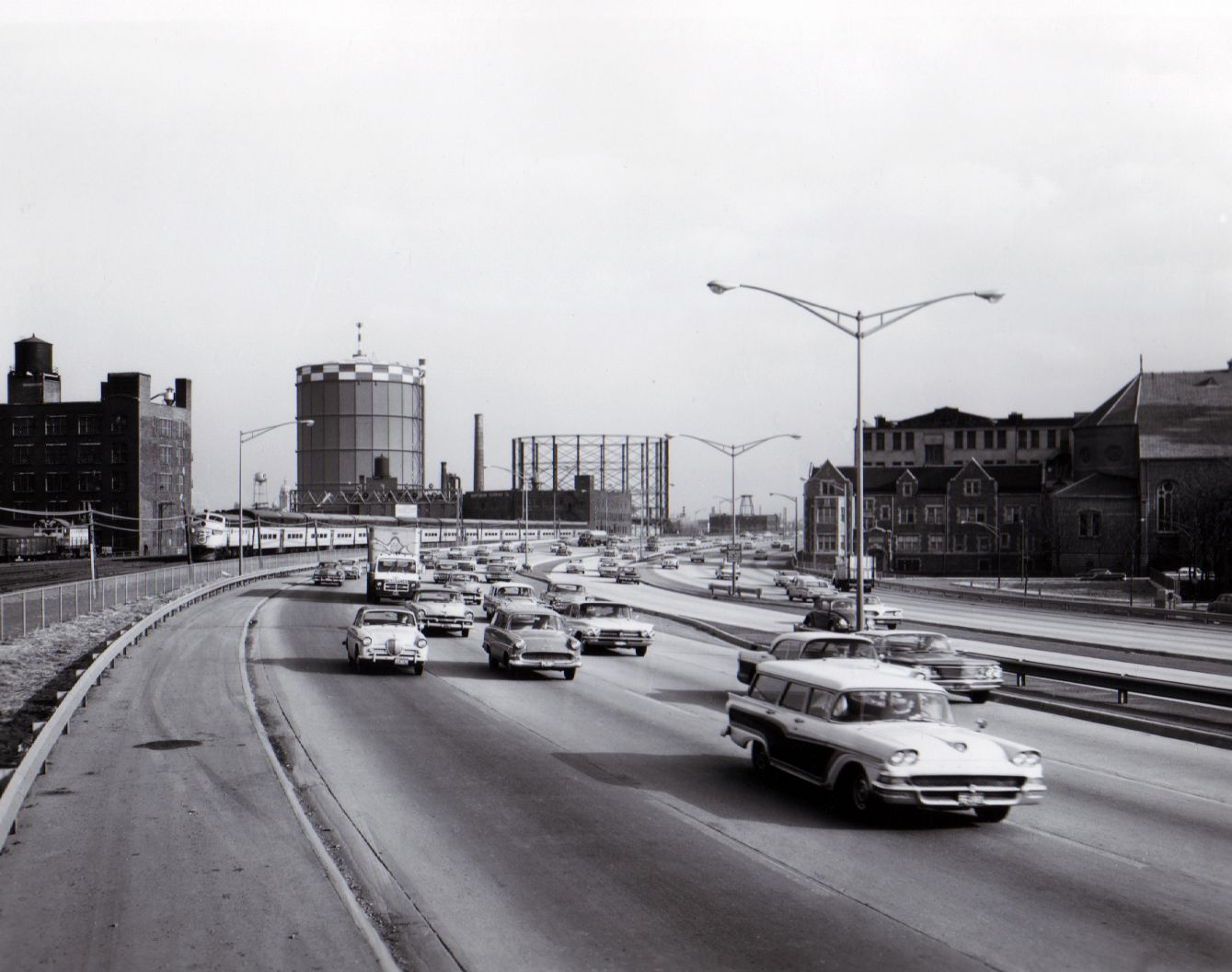
Traffic on the Northwest (Kennedy) Expressway in 1961 (looking south)

The Kennedy was originally constructed along the route of Avondale Avenue, an existing diagonal street, and the C&NW Northwest Line corridor, in the late 1950s and completed on November 5, 1960.

On January 21st 1961, a new reversible roadway was completed.

Originally named the Northwest Expressway for its general direction of travel, the Chicago City Council voted unanimously on November 29, 1963—one week after the assassination of President Kennedy—to rename the highway the John F. Kennedy Expressway.

Throughout 1971, the old roadway was removed and replaced by new roadway.

Until 1978, the Kennedy Expressway was marked as I-94 and Illinois Route 194 (IL 194), I-90 and I-190 replaced IL 194 and thus the Eisenhower Expressway was renamed from I-90 to I-290.

The express portion of the freeway was reconstructed from 1992 through 1994, when the existing express lanes, which previously were reversed by hand, were modernized. In addition, all aspects of the express lanes system were computerized, so that the process could be controlled at both ends from a central location. At least once a day, however, IDOT crews still examine the express lanes for debris while the lanes are closed.

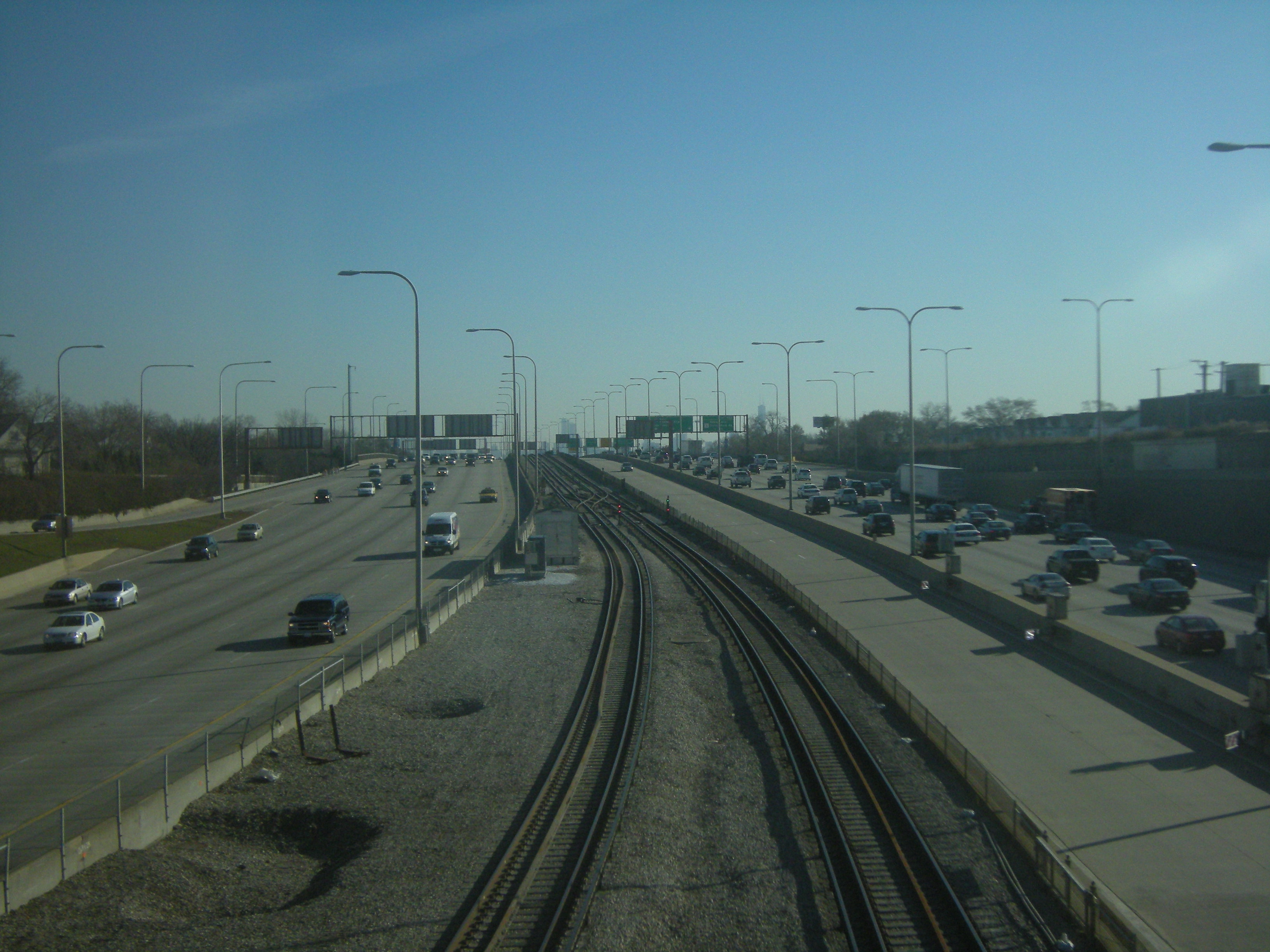
Southeastward view of the Kennedy Expressway from the Montrose Blue Line Station, with the reversible express lanes to the right of the tracks

In 2005, the Washington Street bridge over the expressway was reconstructed, and the entrance ramps to both directions of the Kennedy were partially removed. The same was done in 2006 for the Monroe Street bridge. This left a disconnected portion of each ramp remaining on the expressway, to be removed and the existing "suicide ramps" lengths extended when funding became available. The American Recovery and Reinvestment Act of 2009 provided the necessary funding for the construction between Hubbard Street and the Circle Interchange, commencing in summer 2009. The westbound (facing north) ramps at Adams Street and Madison Street, along with the eastbound (facing south) ramps at Randolph Street and Madison Street, were lengthened by removing what remained of abandoned ramps and lengthening the entrance ramps significantly. The only remaining short, limited-sight, left-side suicide ramp entrance is from Lake Street to the eastbound expressway (heading south). As part of the project, eastbound (heading south) traffic patterns were adjusted. The two right-most lanes were made "exit only" for Chicago Loop, Ida B. Wells Drive, and Eisenhower Expressway exits, the Adams Street and Jackson Boulevard exits were combined, certain center median walls reconstructed, lanes restriped to remove the merging of the leftmost lanes, and appropriate signage changes. For example, the changes increased the taper for the Randolph Street entrance headed eastbound from 160 to 583 feet (49 to 178 m), an increase of over 3.6 time. In the westbound direction (headed north), the exit ramp to Monroe Street was permanently removed.

In 2015, the American Highway Users Alliance named the 12 miles (19 km) of the Kennedy between the Circle Interchange and Edens junction the worst traffic bottleneck in the country.

== Impact ==
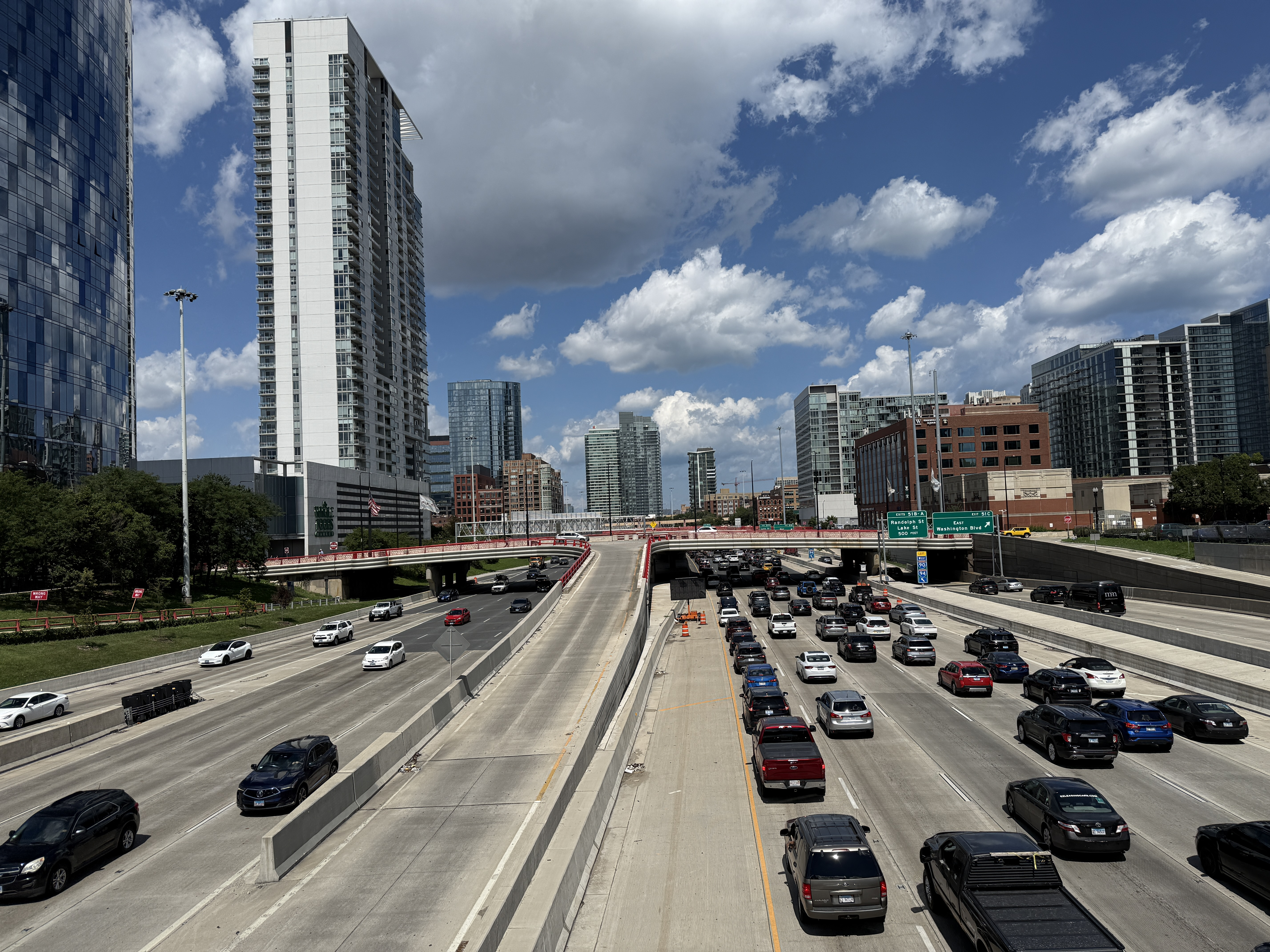
Northward view of the expressway from the Monroe Street overpass

The creation of the Kennedy Expressway displaced "3,306 families and 480 single people". Unlike other expressways on the south and west side of Chicago, areas around the Kennedy maintained much of their density despite the displacement caused by its construction.

The Kennedy Expressway bisected the Avondale neighborhood of Chicago. Avondale residents view the Kennedy's underpasses' unwelcoming conditions as creating a barrier between the two halves of the neighborhood. Residents also complain about traffic congestion and dangerous speeds near the expressway's onramps. A large portion of Avondale Park was destroyed to make way for the Kennedy Expressway, greatly decreasing its size from 5 acres to just over 1 acre. This contributed to Avondale becoming a "park poor" neighborhood.

Areas around the Kennedy Expressway are hotspots for air pollution, especially in the Avondale and Irving Park neighborhoods of Chicago. Residents in these neighborhoods face significant exposure to fine particulate matter (PM2.5), a type of air pollution comprising tiny particles that can penetrate deep into the lungs. PM2.5 poses severe health risks such as heart and lung diseases, asthma, and premature death. PM2.5 is considered the largest environmental contributor to mortality, with approximately 5% of premature deaths in Chicago attributed to this pollution.

== Features ==
The CTA Blue Line operates in the median of the Kennedy Expressway for about 10 miles (16 km) from O'Hare International Airport to just northwest of Kimball Avenue. The first section, an extension from Logan Square to Jefferson Park, opened in 1970. The second section opened between Jefferson Park and River Road (now Rosemont) in February 1983. The third and final section between River Road and O’Hare was opened in September 1984.

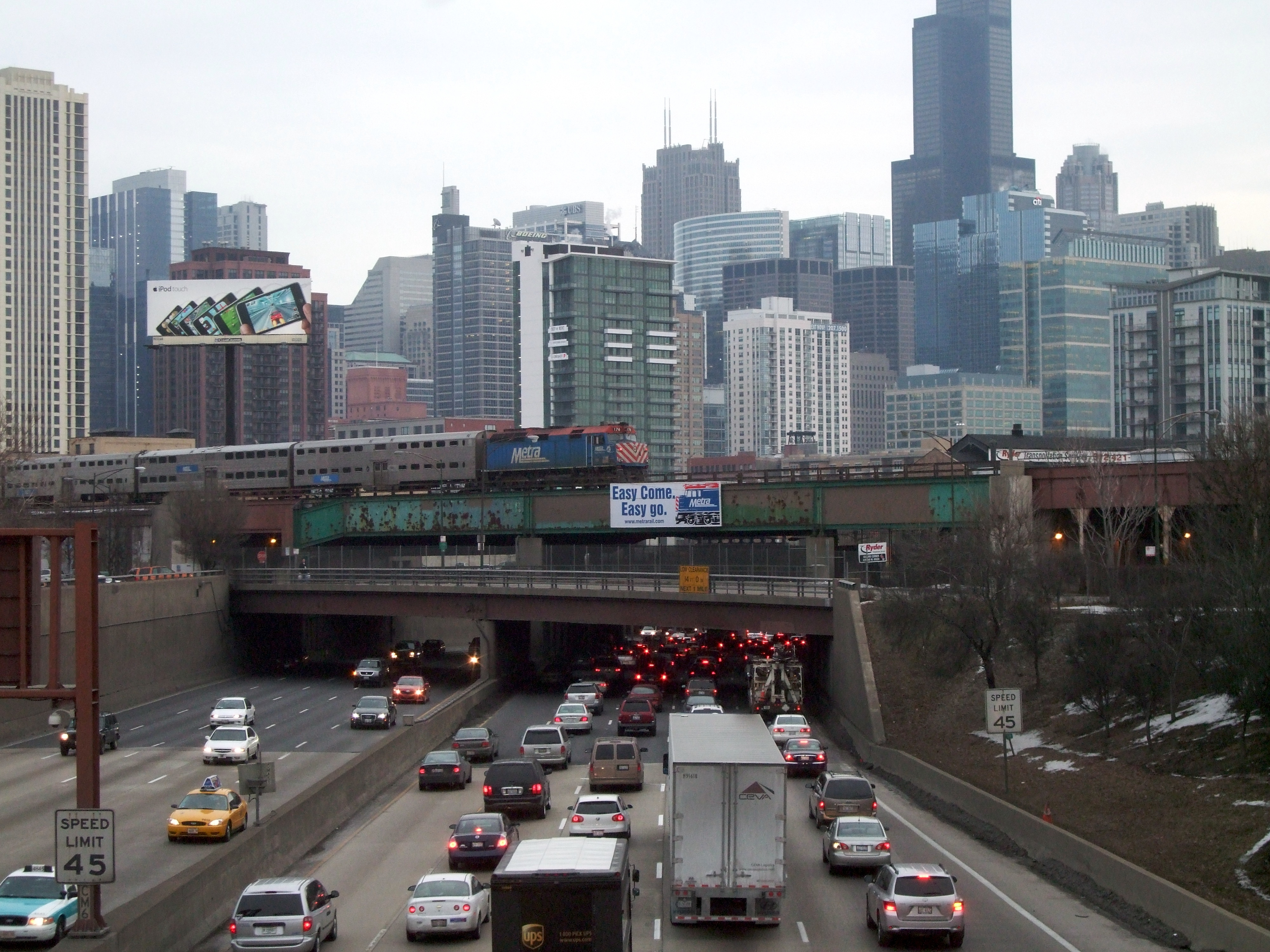
Sign over the Kennedy Expressway, at the north entrance to Hubbard's Cave, encouraging commuters to use Metra trains, such as the Union Pacific West Line train seen here passing over the highway, to avoid the common congestion

The second distinct feature of the Kennedy Expressway is its reversible express lanes where I-94 merges into I-90. The reversible lanes lie in the median of the highway from the Kennedy Expressway/Edens Expressway junction until just north of the Loop (at Ohio Street), a distance of about eight miles (13 km). These reversible lanes, situated between the inbound lanes and the Blue Line tracks, allow two lanes of traffic to flow towards or away from the city, depending on the time of the day. The lanes are controlled by computers and verified by humans at a separate control center. Steel mesh barriers and breakaway gates prevent traffic from entering oncoming lanes. On January 25, 2014, a drunk driver broke through the safety gates and drove in the express lanes in the wrong direction, but was stopped by a snow plow; no injuries were reported. This was the first wrong-way accident involving the express lanes.

A third distinct feature is Hubbard's Cave, also called the Hubbard Street Tunnel, which passes under several streets and the Metra's Union Pacific West, North Central Service, Milwaukee District North, and Milwaukee District West lines (former Chicago & Northwestern and Milwaukee Road commuter lines respectively). It is named for Hubbard Street, one of the streets it passes underneath. Hubbard's Cave is a landmark frequently heard in traffic reports on radio and TV.

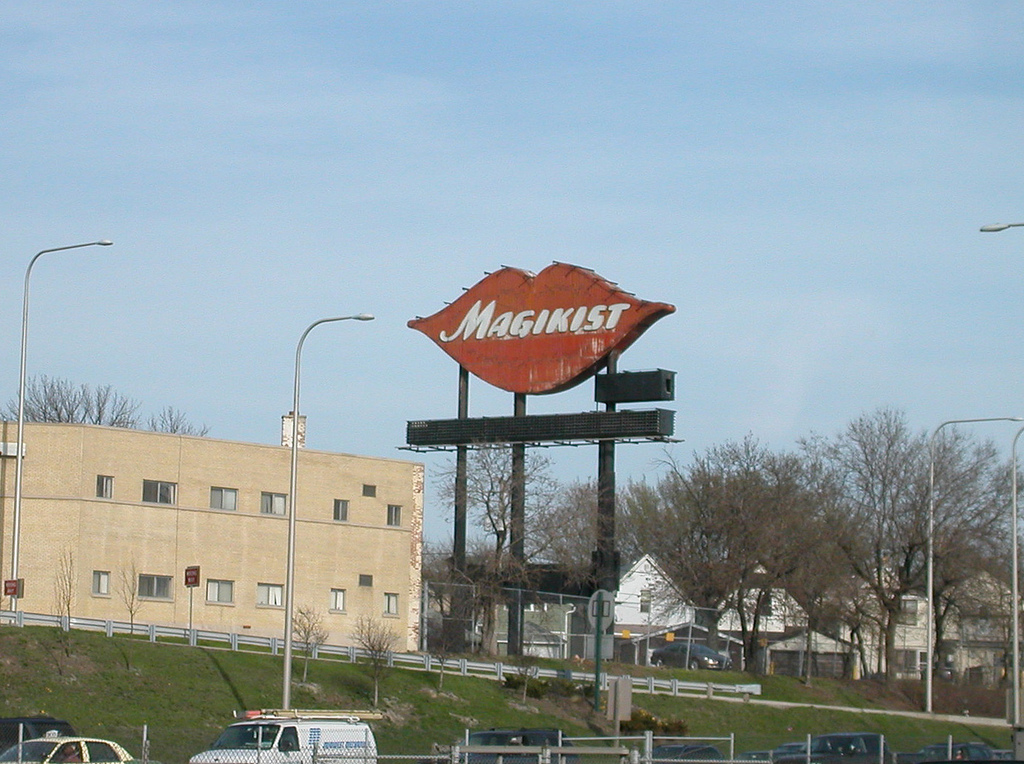
Magikist Lips sign formerly located on the Kennedy Expressway at Montrose Avenue in Chicago, torn down in 2004

The final distinct features are the nine exits in two miles (3.2 km) between mile markers 50 and 51, and the southbound exit to I-290 and Ida B. Wells Drive is marked as exits 51H and 51I. While the density of interchanges is quite dangerous, the hazard is partially offset by the fact that exits are 500 feet (150 m) apart on the right hand side, while entrances to the highway were 500 feet (150 m) apart, but on the left side. Known as the "suicide ramps", the entrance ramps on the left had little to no acceleration zone, and traffic on the ramps could not see mainline traffic until the last 500 feet (150 m) of the ramp. The 2009–10 reconstruction between Hubbard Street and the Circle Interchange improved safety by increasing the lengths of most entrance ramps and reduced bottlenecks by better utilizing the existing space.

The Kennedy Expressway was the location of a large Magikist lips flashing sign which was a Chicago pop culture icon for many years. Located at the southeast corner where Montrose Avenue abutted the expressway, the sign was torn down in 2004.

== Exit list ==
The entire route is in Cook County.

| Location | mi | km | Exit | Destinations | Notes |
|---|---|---|---|---|---|
| Chicago | 0.00 | 0.00 | — | O'Hare International Airport | Western terminus of I-190 |
| Chicago | 0.99 | 1.59 | — | Bessie Coleman Drive – Terminal 5, Rental Car Return | |
| Chicago | 1.27 | 2.04 | 2 | US 12 / US 45 (Mannheim Road) | Signed as exits 2A (north) and 2B (south); eastbound exit 2B shares a ramp with Bessie Coleman Drive |
| Rosemont | 1.79 | 2.88 | 1D | I-294 Toll south (Tri-State Tollway) | |
| Rosemont | 1.81 | 2.91 | 1C | I-294 Toll north (Tri-State Tollway) to I-90 Toll west (Jane Addams Memorial Tollway) – Milwaukee, Rockford | Eastbound exit and westbound entrance |
| Rosemont | 2.24 | 3.60 | 1 | River Road | Signed as exits 1A (north) and 1B (south) eastbound |
| Chicago | 3.07 78.70 | 4.94 126.66 | 0 | I-90 Toll west (Jane Addams Memorial Tollway) to I-294 Toll north (Tri-State Tollway) – Rockford, Milwaukee I-190 ends | Eastern terminus of I-190; westbound exit and eastbound entrance |
| Chicago | 79.60 | 128.10 | 79 | IL 171 (Cumberland Avenue) | Signed as exits 79A (south) and 79B (north) |
| Chicago | 80.30 | 129.23 | 80 | Canfield Road | Westbound exit and eastbound entrance |
| Chicago | 81.20 | 130.68 | 81A | IL 43 (Harlem Avenue) | |
| Chicago | 81.20 | 130.68 | 81B | Sayre Avenue (7000 West) | Westbound exit and eastbound entrance |
| Chicago | 82.20 | 132.29 | 82A | Nagle Avenue (6432 West) | No westbound exit |
| Chicago | 82.40 | 132.61 | 82B | Bryn Mawr Avenue (5600 North) to Nagle Avenue (6432 West) | Westbound exit only |
| Chicago | 82.80 | 133.25 | 82C | Austin Avenue (6000 West) | Eastbound exit only |
| Chicago | 83.30 | 134.06 | 83A | Foster Avenue (5200 North) | No eastbound exit |
| Chicago | 83.50 | 134.38 | 83B | Central Avenue (5600 West) | Westbound exit and eastbound entrance |
| Chicago | 84.20 | 135.51 | 84 | Lawrence Avenue (4800 North) to IL 50 (Cicero Avenue) | To I-94 west (Edens Expressway) |
| Chicago | 84.80 43.32 | 136.47 69.72 | 43B | I-94 west (Edens Expressway) – Milwaukee | "The Junction"; western terminus of the concurrency with I-94; westbound exit and eastbound entrance; exit number follows I-94 |
| Chicago | 43.60 | 70.17 | 43C | Montrose Avenue (4400 North) | Westbound exit and eastbound entrance |
| Chicago | 43.90 | 70.65 | 43D | Kostner Avenue (4400 West) | Westbound exit only |
| Chicago | 44.30 | 71.29 | 44A | IL 19 (Irving Park Road (4000 North)) / Keeler Avenue | No westbound exit |
| Chicago | 44.50 | 71.62 | 44B | IL 19 (Irving Park Road (4000 North)) / Pulaski Road (4000 West) | Westbound exit and eastbound entrance |
| Chicago | 45.10 | 72.58 | 45A | Addison Street (3600 North) | |
| Chicago | 45.50 | 73.23 | 45B | Kimball Avenue (3400 West) | |
| Chicago | 45.80 | 73.71 | 45C | Belmont Avenue (3200 North) | Westbound exit and eastbound entrance |
| Chicago | 46.10 | 74.19 | — | Sacramento Avenue (3000 West) | Eastbound entrance only |
| Chicago | 46.30 | 74.51 | 46A | California Avenue (2800 West), Diversey Avenue (2800 North) | Eastbound exit and westbound entrance |
| Chicago | 46.50 | 74.83 | 46B | Diversey Avenue (2800 North), California Avenue (2800 West) | Westbound exit only and eastbound entrance |
| Chicago | 47.05– 47.50 | 75.72– 76.44 | 47A | Western Avenue (2400 West) / Fullerton Avenue (2400 North) | No eastbound access to Western Avenue |
| Chicago | 47.60 | 76.60 | 47B | Damen Avenue (2000 West) | Westbound exit and eastbound entrance |
| Chicago | 48.15 | 77.49 | 48A | Armitage Avenue (2000 North) | |
| Chicago | 48.70 | 78.38 | 48B | IL 64 (North Avenue) (1600 North) | |
| Chicago | 49.40 | 79.50 | 49A | Division Street (1200 North) | |
| Chicago | 49.70– 49.80 | 79.98– 80.15 | 49B | Augusta Boulevard / Milwaukee Avenue (1000 North) | Westbound exit and eastbound entrance |
| Chicago | 50.10 | 80.63 | 50A | Ogden Avenue (1200 West) | Eastbound exit and westbound entrance |
| Chicago | 50.40 | 81.11 | 50B | Ohio Street east (600 North) | Eastern terminus of express lanes; access to Navy Pier |
| Chicago | 51.00 | 82.08 | 51A | Lake Street (200 North) | Westbound exit and eastbound entrance |
| Chicago | 51.10 | 82.24 | 51B | Randolph Street west (150 North) | |
| Chicago | 51.20 | 82.40 | 51C | Washington Boulevard east (100 North) | No entrance ramps |
| Chicago | 51.30 | 82.56 | 51D | Madison Street (0 North/South) | |
| Chicago | 51.40 | 82.72 | 51E | Monroe Street (100 South) | Eastbound exit only |
| Chicago | 51.50 | 82.88 | 51F | Adams Street west (200 South) | Eastbound exit only; shared ramp with exit 51G; Route 66 |
| Chicago | 51.60 | 83.04 | 51G | Jackson Boulevard east (300 South) | Eastbound exit and westbound entrance; shared exit ramp with exit 51F |
| Chicago | 51.80 | 83.36 | 51H | I-290 west (Eisenhower Expressway) / IL 110 (CKC) west – Aurora | Eastbound exit and westbound entrance |
| Chicago | 51.80 | 83.36 | 51I | Ida B. Wells Drive east – Chicago Loop (500 South) | Eastbound exit and westbound entrance |
| Chicago | 51.80 | 83.36 | — | I-90 east / I-94 east (Dan Ryan Expressway) – Indiana | I-90 and I-94 continue east |
1.000 mi = 1.609 km; 1.000 km = 0.621 mi: Concurrency terminus; Incomplete access; Route transition

== See also ==
- List of memorials to John F. Kennedy
