= Interstate 190 (Illinois) =

Interstate Highway in Cook County, Illinois, US

Interstate 190
- Kennedy Expressway
- I-190 highlighted in red

Route information
- Auxiliary route of I-90
- Maintained by IDOT
- Length: 3.07 mi (4.94 km)
- Existed: 1978–present
- NHS: Entire route

Major junctions
- West end: O'Hare International Airport in Chicago
- US 12 / US 45 in Chicago; I-294 Toll in Rosemont
- East end: I-90 in Chicago

Location
- Country: United States
- State: Illinois
- Counties: Cook

Highway system
- Interstate Highway System; Main; Auxiliary; Suffixed; Business; Future; Illinois State Highway System; Interstate; US; State; Tollways; Scenic
← IL 185	→ IL 192

Interstate 190 (I-190) is an auxiliary Interstate Highway in the US state of Illinois. I-190 runs west from I-90 to O'Hare International Airport, for a distance of 3.07 miles (4.94 km). I-190 is the westernmost leg of the Kennedy Expressway.

== Route description ==
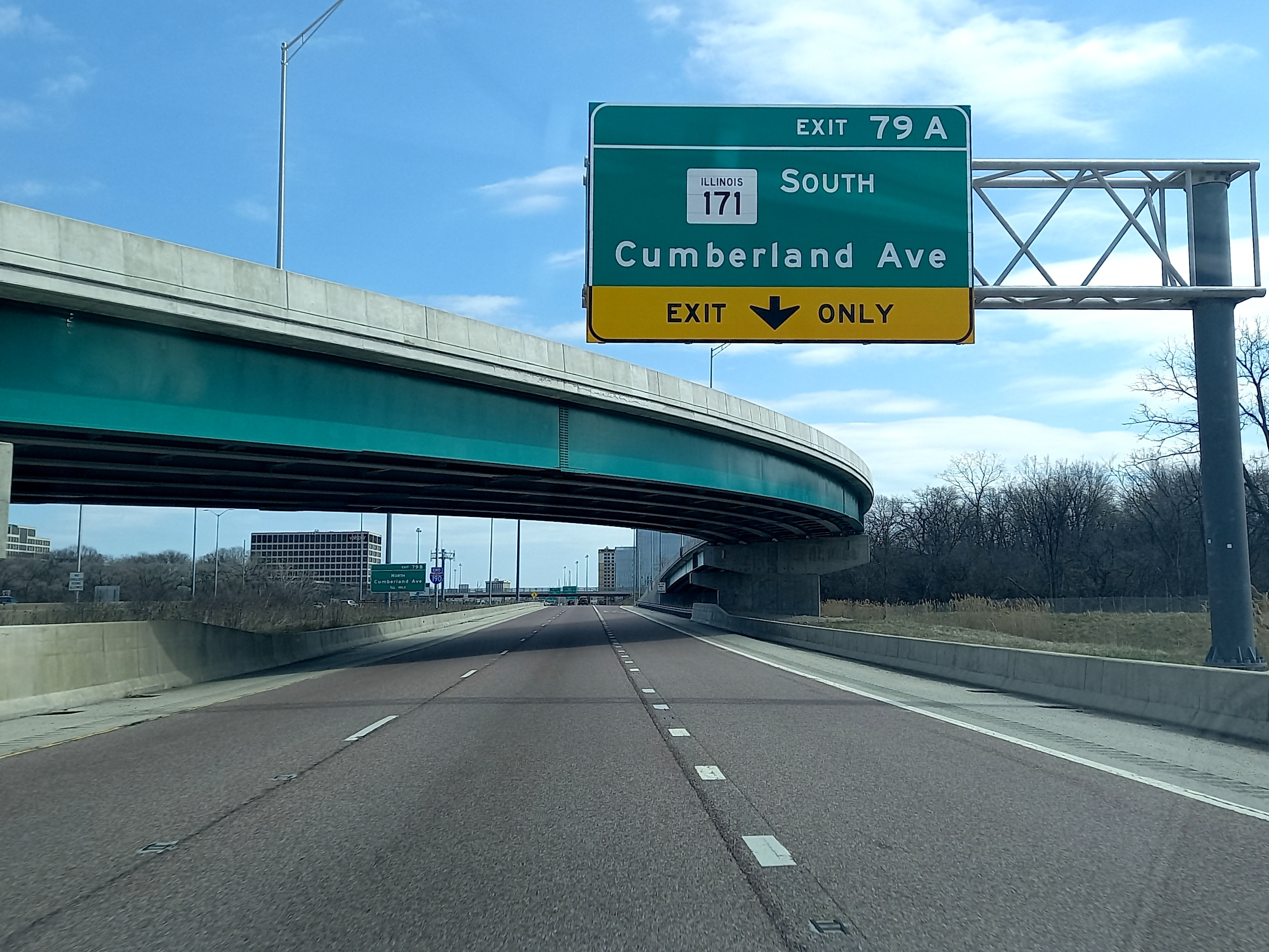
Eastern terminus of I-190, located west of IL 171)

I-190 has two lanes in either direction between I-90 and I-294 and three lanes west of I-294. The freeway portion of I-190 consists largely of cloverleaf interchanges. The Chicago Transit Authority's Blue Line operates in the median of I-190 for the highway's entire length.

Each road crossing I-190 is accessible via exit ramps. Not all interchanges are accessible in the same way from both directions, however. For example, the exit to southbound US Route 12 (US 12)/US 45 traveling eastbound on I-190 requires exiting at Bessie Coleman Drive. Westbound, direct access is provided. Also, the first exit on I-190 westbound is Illinois Route 171 (IL 171, Cumberland Avenue).

There is no specific sign indicating I-190's western terminus at O'Hare. Interstate-standard freeway ends roughly at the ramps to the upper (departure) and lower (arrival) loops. The freeway then resumes shortly after both loops merge to cross an emergency fire lane.

The eastern terminus, I-90, is considered to be the origin point of the highway. Both exit numbers and mileage markers on roadside light fixtures ascend traveling westbound.

== History ==
The highway that is now I-190 was signed as part of Illinois Route 194 (IL 194) from 1960 to 1970. In 1971, it was changed to Illinois Route 594 (IL 594). Then, it was changed to I-190 around 1978 after the rest of IL 194 was changed to I-90 in the mid- to late 1970s.

In late 2005, the interchange with Mannheim Road was reconstructed to remove unsafe conditions and bring the route closer to Interstate standards. In the late 1990s, the Illinois Department of Transportation (IDOT) restriped I-190 at I-294. This action increased the number of lanes west of I-294 from two to three. In the process, the speed limit was reduced from 45 to 35 mph (72 to 56 km/h), and yield signs were erected at the ends of the ramp from northbound Mannheim Road to westbound I-190, the busiest ramp at that intersection. This created a hazardous condition, often leading to high-speed crashes should drivers waiting on the ramp become impatient or underestimate the speed of westbound traffic. Often, an IDOT Minuteman (rapid response vehicle) would be stationed on the ramp waiting to tow away vehicles that were involved in crashes during rush hour.

== Exit list ==
Although exit numbers on I-190 increase from east to west, this table presents interchanges from west to east to follow IDOT milepost measurements starting at O'Hare.

The entire route is in Cook County.

Location	mi	km	Exit	Destinations	Notes
Chicago	0.00	0.00	3	O'Hare International Airport	Western terminus; western end of Kennedy Expressway
Chicago	0.99	1.59	2C	Bessie Coleman Drive – International Terminal	Economy Parking Lots
Chicago	1.27	2.04	2	US 12 / US 45 (Mannheim Road)	Signed as exits 2A (west/north) and 2B (east/south) westbound; eastbound exit is via Bessie Coleman Drive
Rosemont	1.79	2.88	1D	I-294 Toll south (Tri-State Tollway) – Indiana	I-294 north exit 40; no eastbound entrance
Rosemont	1.81	2.91	1C	I-294 Toll north (Tri-State Tollway) to I-90 Toll west (Jane Addams Memorial Tollway) – Milwaukee, Rockford	Eastbound exit and westbound entrance; I-294 south exit 40A; I-90 east exit 77A
Rosemont	2.24	3.60	1	River Road	Signed as exits 1A (north) and 1B (south) eastbound
Chicago	3.07	4.94	0	I-90 Toll west (Jane Addams Memorial Tollway) to I-294 Toll north (Tri-State Tollway) – Rockford, Milwaukee	Westbound exit
Chicago	3.07	4.94	—	I-90 east (Kennedy Expressway east) – Chicago Loop	Eastbound exit and westbound entrance; I-90 west exit 79C; eastern terminus
1.000 mi = 1.609 km; 1.000 km = 0.621 mi: Incomplete access
