= Mile-Long Bridge =

Bridge in the United States

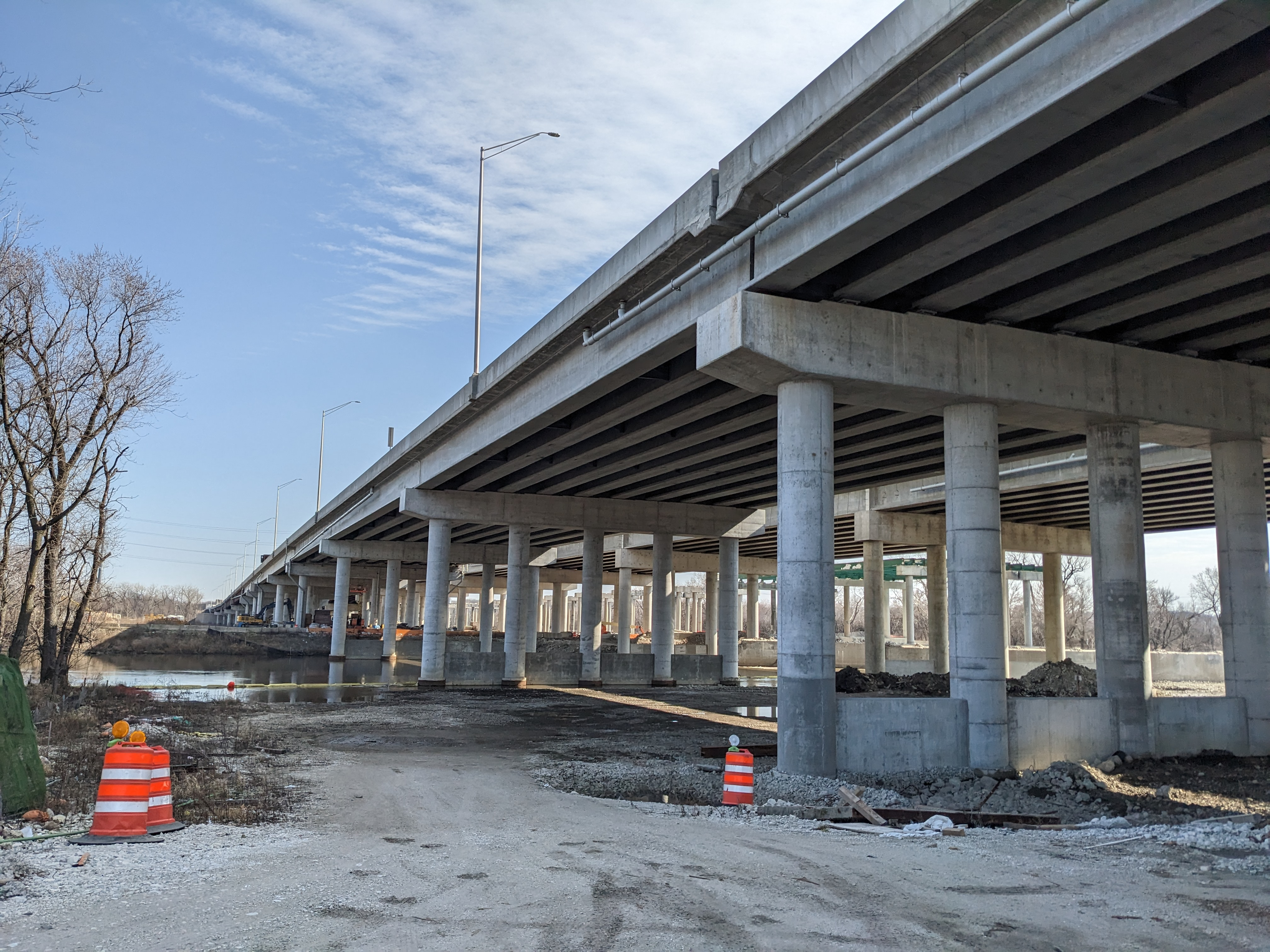
- The Mile-Long bridge crossing the Des Plaines River
- Coordinates: 41.7504°N 87.8652°W
- Carries: 10 lanes of I-294 Toll
- Crosses: Des Plaines River; Ship and Sanitary Canal; BNSF Chillicothe Subdivision; CN Joliet Subdivision; Chicago Intermodal Facility
- Locale: Willow Springs, IL
- Maintained by: Illinois State Toll Highway Authority
- ID number: 000016095903931

Characteristics
- Design: Steel girder
- Total length: 4,608 ft (1,404.5 m)
- Width: 42 ft (12.8 m)

History
- Opened: 1958
- Rebuilt: 2022

Statistics
- Daily traffic: 150,000

Location
- Interactive map of Mile-Long Bridge

The Mile-Long Bridge is the colloquial name for a 4,608-foot-long (1,404.5 m) bridge in the northeastern part of the U.S. state of Illinois. The bridge carries Interstate 294 (I-294) over the Des Plaines River, the Chicago Ship and Sanitary Canal, two major railroad lines, and an intermodal facility. A series of 51 piers carries I-294 over the broad Des Plaines River valley.

In spite of its name, the bridge falls 672 feet (205 m) short of one full mile in length.

== History ==
=== Reconstruction (2019–2023) ===
As part of the Central Tri-State Tollway Project, construction of a new Mile-Long Bridge structure, together with demolition of the original 1958 structure, proceeded in phases commencing in 2019. In the first completed phase of the project, a new northbound bridge structure opened to traffic in November 2020. Demolition of the old northbound structure commenced in 2021, followed by the construction of a new southbound structure. The completed southbound structure opened to traffic in October 2022. Removal of the old southbound structure is expected to be complete in 2023.
