= Magikist =

Cleaning company

- Industry: carpet cleaning
- Defunct: 2001
- Fate: Dissolved
- Headquarters: Chicago, Illinois, United States
- Key people: Wilbur Gage

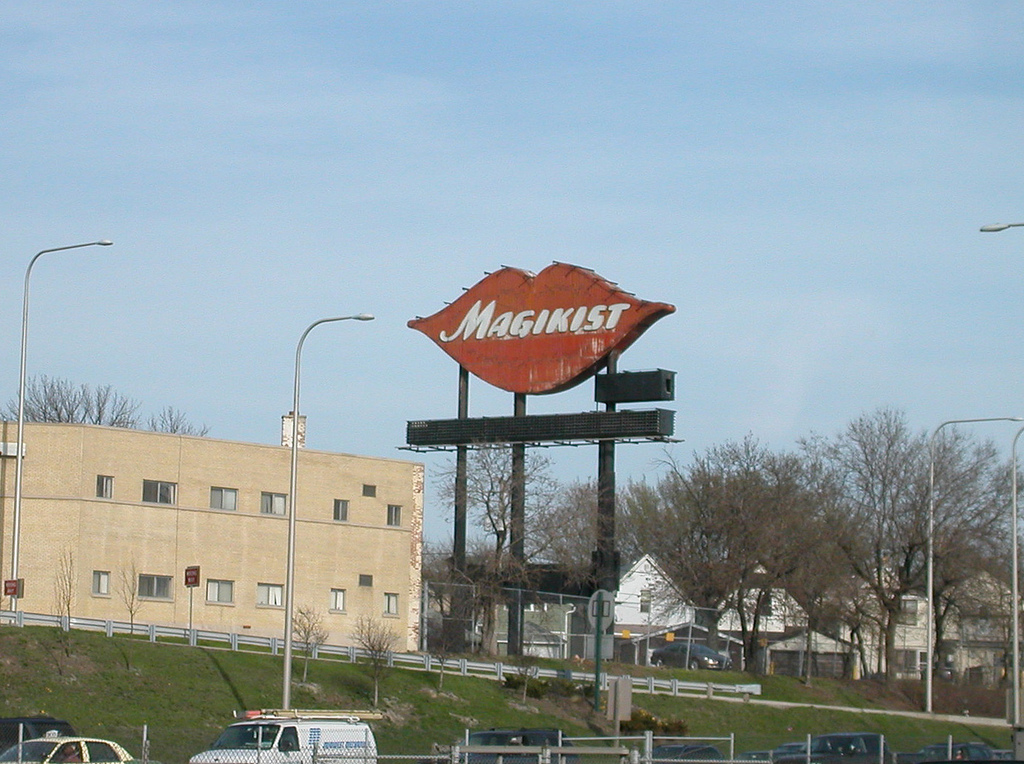
Magikist lips sign formerly located alongside the Kennedy Expressway at Montrose Avenue in Chicago

Magikist was an American rug cleaner manufacturer and cleaning company. After the parent company went out of business in 2001, the name was sold and is currently used by a Canadian manufacturer of pressure wash equipment. The original company was notable for its large, flashing advertising signs, which were a part of pop culture in the Chicago area.

== History ==
Magikist was founded in the 1940s by Wilbur "Bill" Gage, who changed the name of his Austin Rug Cleaners to Magikist, melding the words "magic" and "kissed." His wife at the time, Doris Greenwood, suggested the "sweetest name in rug cleaning" slogan and came up with the company logo, a pair of red lips. Gage operated Magikist in the Chicago area south of Howard Street and Lionel and Shirley Gelfand operated Magikist in the area north of Howard Street.

In the Chicago area, the Magikist Lips (in the form of huge signs on the Edens Expressway, Dan Ryan Expressway, Kennedy Expressway, and Eisenhower Expressway which lit up and flashed) were well-known landmarks. Chicago journalist Eric Zorn wrote a piece about the Edens sign (the last existing) after it was torn down in 2004. The signs were 75 feet wide and 40 feet high at the pucker. Travelers from the early 1960s through the late 1990s tended to use them as landmarks to figure out how much longer it would take to arrive at their destination.

Chicago musician/artist Wesley Willis frequently mentioned Magikist in his song lyrics, although he used the word as a term of high praise, akin to "magician".
